= List of awards and nominations received by Harry Styles =

Harry Styles awards and nominations
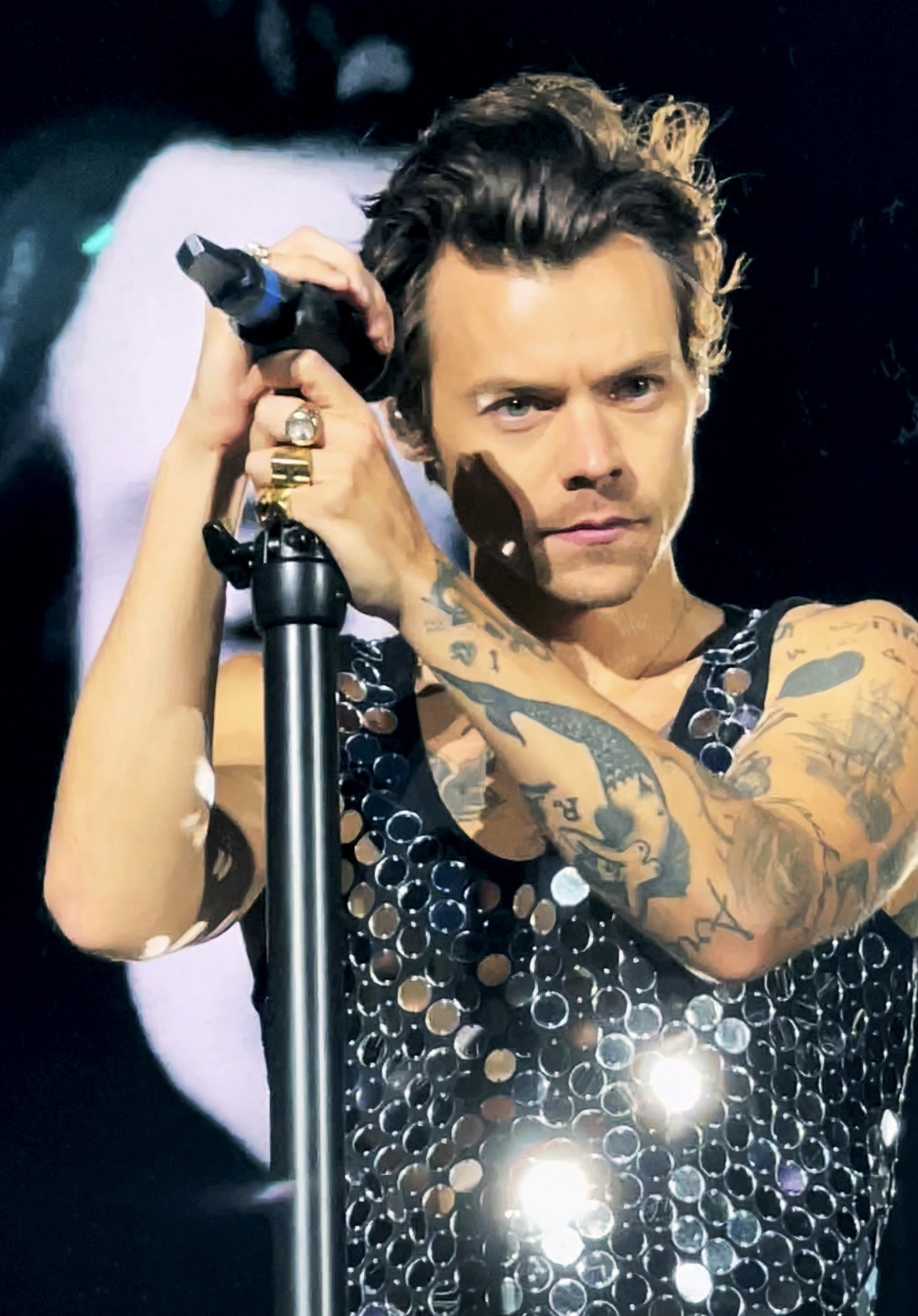
- Styles performing at Wembley Stadium in 2022
Awards and nominations
Award	Wins	Nominations
American Music Awards	3	6
APRA Music Awards	1	2
ARIA Music Awards	3	3
BBC Music Awards	0	1
Billboard Music Awards	1	3
BMI London Awards	3	3
BMI Pop Awards	3	3
Bravo Otto Awards	0	2
Brit Awards	6	8
British Arrows	1	1
British LGBT Awards	0	3
Camerimage International Film Festival Awards	0	2
Capricho Awards	0	8
Clio Awards	2	2
Critics' Choice Movie Awards	0	1
D&AD Awards	2	2
Danish Music Awards	0	3
The Fashion Awards	1	1
Gaffa Awards	4	6
Global Awards	5	11
Grammy Awards	3	9
Hits FM Music Awards	2	2
Hungarian Music Awards	0	1
IFPI	1	1
iHeartRadio Music Awards	9	17
iHeartRadio Titanium Awards	3	3
Ivor Novello Awards	2	6
Joox Thailand Music Awards	0	1
Juno Awards	2	2
Los 40 Music Awards	1	10
Melon Music Awards	0	1
Mercury Prize	0	1
Meus Prêmios Nick	0	3
MTV Europe Music Awards	3	12
MTV Italian Music Awards	0	1
MTV Millennial Awards	2	4
MTV Millennial Awards Brazil	0	2
MTV Movie & TV Awards	0	2
MTV Video Music Awards	4	18
MTV Video Music Awards Japan	1	1
Music Producers Guild Awards	1	3
Music Week Awards	1	1
MVPA Awards	2	6
Myx Music Awards	0	2
National Film Awards UK	0	2
Nickelodeon Australian Kids' Choice Awards	1	2
Nickelodeon Kids' Choice Awards	3	6
Nickelodeon Mexico Kids' Choice Awards	0	6
NME Awards	2	3
NRJ Music Awards	2	6
People's Choice Awards	3	8
Pollstar Awards	5	10
Premios MUSA	1	2
Premios Odeón	1	2
Qmusic Top 40 Awards	1	1
Rockbjörnen	0	3
RTHK International Pop Poll Awards	1	3
Shorty Award	0	2
Silver Clef Award	1	1
Swiss Music Awards	2	2
TEC Awards	0	1
Teen Choice Awards	9	14
Ticketmaster Awards	0	1
TIFF Tribute Awards	1	1
UK Music Video Awards	1	3
Variety's Hitmakers Awards	1	1
Washington D.C. Area Film Critics Association Awards	0	1
Webby Awards	1	4
Žebřík Music Awards	5	6

Totals (Note: Certain award groups do not simply award one winner. They acknowledge several different recipients, have runners-up, and have third place. Since this is a specific recognition and is different from losing an award, runner-up mentions are considered wins in this award tally. For simplification and to avoid errors, each award in this list has been presumed to have had a prior nomination.)
- Wins: 112
- Nominations: 270

Harry Styles is an English singer, songwriter, and actor who has received various accolades, including six Brit Awards, three Grammy Awards, two Ivor Novello Awards, three American Music Awards, four MTV Video Music Awards, and nine iHeartRadio Music Awards. Styles has earned three ARIA Awards for Best International Artist, for each of his first three solo studio albums.

Styles's music career began in 2010 as a member of the boy band One Direction, winning three BMI London Awards for co-writing songs for the band. Following the group's indefinite hiatus in 2016, he signed a solo record deal with Columbia Records and released his debut single, "Sign of the Times" (2017). It won a BMI Pop Award, and its music video won the Brit Award for British Video of the Year and the iHeartRadio Music Award for Best Music Video. Styles's debut studio album, Harry Styles (2017), earned him nominations at the Gaffa Awards and the Los 40 Music Awards.

Styles's second studio album, Fine Line (2019), and its singles "Lights Up", "Adore You", "Falling", "Watermelon Sugar", "Golden", and "Treat People with Kindness" received various awards and nominations. Fine Line won the American Music Award for Favorite Pop/Rock Album and the Juno Award for International Album of the Year, and was nominated for the Brit Award for British Album of the Year and the Grammy Award for Best Pop Vocal Album. "Adore You" garnered three nominations at the MTV Video Music Awards and was nominated for the Grammy Award for Best Music Video, and "Watermelon Sugar" won the Grammy Award for Best Pop Solo Performance.

Styles's third studio album, Harry's House (2022), won Album of the Year and Best Pop Vocal Album at the Grammy Awards, British Album of the Year at the Brit Awards, Album of the Year at the MTV Video Music Awards, International Album of the Year at the Juno Awards, and Best International Album at the Los 40 Music Awards. The album was also shortlisted for the 2022 Mercury Prize. Harry's House's lead single, "As It Was", garnered four Grammy nominations: Record of the Year, Song of the Year, Best Pop Solo Performance, and Best Music Video. It won the American Music Award for Favorite Pop/Rock Song, the Brit Award for Song of the Year, and the MTV Video Music Award for Best Pop. The track became IFPI's best-selling single of the year.

Styles starred in the historical war film Dunkirk (2017), for which he received acting ensemble nominations at the Critics' Choice Movie Awards and the Washington D.C. Area Film Critics Association Awards. In 2022, Styles was nominated for the MTV Movie Award for Best Villain for his role as Jack Chambers in the psychological thriller film Don't Worry Darling. For his performance in the romantic drama film My Policeman (2022), Styles received a nomination for the MTV Movie Award for Best Kiss and won the TIFF Tribute Award for Performance as part of the film's acting ensemble.

== Awards and nominations ==
Awards and nominations received by Harry Styles
Award	Year (Note: Indicates the year of ceremony. Each year is linked to the article about the awards held that year, wherever possible.)	Nominee/work	Category	Result	Ref.
American Music Awards	2020	Fine Line	Favorite Pop/Rock Album	Won	
American Music Awards	2022	Himself	Artist of the Year	Nominated	
American Music Awards	2022	Himself	Favorite Pop/Rock Male Artist	Won	
American Music Awards	2022	"As It Was"	Favorite Music Video	Nominated	
American Music Awards	2022	"As It Was"	Favorite Pop/Rock Song	Won	
American Music Awards	2022	Harry's House	Favorite Pop/Rock Album	Nominated	
American Music Awards	2026	Himself	Artist of the Year	Nominated	
American Music Awards	2026	Himself	Best Male Pop Artist	Nominated	
American Music Awards	2026	"American Girls"	Song of the Summer	Nominated	
APRA Music Awards	2021	"Adore You"	Most Performed International Work	Nominated	
APRA Music Awards	2023	"As It Was"	Most Performed International Work	Won	
ARIA Music Awards	2017	Himself	Best International Artist	Won	
ARIA Music Awards	2020	Himself	Best International Artist	Won	
ARIA Music Awards	2022	Himself	Best International Artist	Won	
ARIA Music Awards	2026	Himself	Most Popular International Artist	Pending	
BBC Music Awards	2017	Himself	Artist of the Year	Nominated	
Billboard Music Awards	2020	Himself	Billboard Chart Achievement Award	Won	
Billboard Music Awards	2021	"Adore You"	Top Radio Song	Nominated	
Billboard Music Awards	2021	Himself	Top Radio Songs Artist	Nominated	
Billboard Music Awards	2022	Love On Tour	Top Tour	Nominated	
Billboard Music Awards	2023	"As It Was"	Top Billboard Global (Excl. U.S.) Song	Nominated	
BMI London Awards	2014	"Story of My Life"	Pop Award	Won	
BMI London Awards	2016	"Night Changes"	Pop Award	Won	
BMI London Awards	2016	"Perfect"	Pop Award	Won	
BMI Pop Awards	2018	"Sign of the Times"	Award-Winning Songs	Won	
BMI Pop Awards	2022	"Golden"	Award-Winning Songs	Won	
BMI Pop Awards	2023	"As It Was"	Award-Winning Songs	Won	
Bravo Otto	2020	Himself	International Singer	Nominated	
Bravo Otto	2022	Himself	International Singer	Nominated	
BreakTudo Awards	2026	Himself	International Male Artist	Pending	
Brit Awards	2018	"Sign of the Times"	British Video of the Year	Won	
Brit Awards	2020	Fine Line	British Album of the Year	Nominated	
Brit Awards	2020	Himself	British Male Solo Artist	Nominated	
Brit Awards	2021	"Watermelon Sugar"	British Single of the Year	Won	
Brit Awards	2023	Harry's House	British Album of the Year	Won	
Brit Awards	2023	"As It Was"	Song of the Year	Won	
Brit Awards	2023	Himself	British Artist of the Year	Won	
Brit Awards	2023	Himself	Best Pop/R&B Act	Won	
British Arrows	2023	"Music for a Sushi Restaurant"	Music Video	Silver	
British LGBT Awards	2018	Himself	Ally of the Year	Nominated	
British LGBT Awards	2021	Himself	Top 10 Music Artists	Nominated	
British LGBT Awards	2023	Himself	Celebrity Ally	Nominated	
Camerimage International Film Festival Awards	2021	"Falling"	Best Music Video	Nominated	
Camerimage International Film Festival Awards	2022	"As It Was"	Best Music Video	Nominated	
Capricho Awards	2017	Himself	International Artist (Music)	Nominated	
Capricho Awards	2017	Himself	International Crush	Nominated	
Capricho Awards	2017	Himself	International Fashionista	Nominated	
Capricho Awards	2020	Himself	International Artist of the Year	Nominated	
Capricho Awards	2020	"Watermelon Sugar"	International Hit of the Year	Nominated	
Capricho Awards	2022	"As It Was"	International Hit of the Year	Nominated	
Capricho Awards	2022	Himself	International Artist of the Year	Nominated	
Capricho Awards	2022	Harry's House	Album of the Year	Nominated	
Clio Awards	2020	"Falling"	Music Videos - Music Marketing	Won	
Clio Awards	2020	"Adore You"	Music Videos - Direction	Won	
Critics' Choice Movie Awards	2017	Dunkirk	Best Acting Ensemble (Note: Shared with the cast)	Nominated	
D&AD Awards	2023	"Music for a Sushi Restaurant"	Best Cinematography	Wood Pencil	
D&AD Awards	2023	"Music for a Sushi Restaurant"	Best Narrative	Graphite Pencil	
Danish Music Awards	2020	Fine Line	International Album of the Year	Nominated	
Danish Music Awards	2022	Harry's House	International Album of the Year	Nominated	
Danish Music Awards	2022	"As It Was"	International Hit of the Year	Nominated	
The Fashion Awards	2013	Himself	British Style Award	Won	
Filipino Music Awards	2026	Himself	International Artist – People’s Choice Awards	Nominated	
Gaffa Awards	2018	Harry Styles	International Album of the Year	Nominated	
Gaffa Awards	2018	Himself	International Solo Artist of the Year	Nominated	
Gaffa Awards	2021	"Watermelon Sugar"	International Hit of the Year	Won	
Gaffa Awards	2023	"As It Was"	International Hit of the Year	Won	
Gaffa Awards	2023	Harry's House	International Album of the Year	Won	
Gaffa Awards	2023	Himself	International Solo Artist of the Year	Won	
Global Awards	2020	"Lights Up"	Best Song	Won	
Global Awards	2020	Himself	Best Male	Nominated	
Global Awards	2021	Himself	Best Male	Won	
Global Awards	2023	Himself	Best British Act	Won	
Global Awards	2023	Himself	Mass Appeal	Nominated	
Global Awards	2023	Himself	Best Male	Won	
Global Awards	2023	"Late Night Talking"	Best Song	Nominated	
Global Awards	2023	"As It Was"	Best Song	Won	
Global Awards	2024	Himself	Best Male	Nominated	
Global Awards	2024	Himself	Best Pop	Nominated	
Global Awards	2024	Himself	Best Fans	Nominated	
Grammy Awards	2021	"Watermelon Sugar"	Best Pop Solo Performance	Won	
Grammy Awards	2021	Fine Line	Best Pop Vocal Album	Nominated	
Grammy Awards	2021	"Adore You"	Best Music Video	Nominated	
Grammy Awards	2023	"As It Was"	Record of the Year	Nominated	
Grammy Awards	2023	"As It Was"	Song of the Year	Nominated	
Grammy Awards	2023	"As It Was"	Best Pop Solo Performance	Nominated	
Grammy Awards	2023	"As It Was"	Best Music Video	Nominated	
Grammy Awards	2023	Harry's House	Best Pop Vocal Album	Won	
Grammy Awards	2023	Harry's House	Album of the Year	Won	
Hits FM Music Awards	2022	"As It Was"	Top 10 Singles	Won	
Hits FM Music Awards	2022	"Late Night Talking"	Top 10 Singles	Won	
Hungarian Music Awards	2021	Fine Line	Foreign Pop/Rock Album or Soundtrack of the Year	Nominated	
IFPI	2022	"As It Was"	Best Selling Single of the Year	Won	
iHeartRadio Music Awards	2018	"Sign of the Times"	Best Music Video	Won	
iHeartRadio Music Awards	2018	Himself	Best Solo Breakout	Nominated	
iHeartRadio Music Awards	2018	"The Chain"	Best Cover Song	Won	
iHeartRadio Music Awards	2019	"You're Still the One"	Best Cover Song	Won	
iHeartRadio Music Awards	2021	"Juice"	Best Cover Song	Won	
iHeartRadio Music Awards	2021	"Adore You"	Best Lyrics	Won	
iHeartRadio Music Awards	2021	"Watermelon Sugar"	Song of the Year	Nominated	
iHeartRadio Music Awards	2021	"Watermelon Sugar"	Best Music Video	Nominated	
iHeartRadio Music Awards	2021	Himself	Male Artist of the Year	Nominated	
iHeartRadio Music Awards	2021	Himself	Best Fan Army	Nominated	
iHeartRadio Music Awards	2022	Love On Tour	Tour of the Year	Won	
iHeartRadio Music Awards	2023	Love On Tour	Favorite Residency	Won	
iHeartRadio Music Awards	2023	"As It Was"	Song of the Year	Nominated	
iHeartRadio Music Awards	2023	"As It Was"	Best Music Video	Nominated	
iHeartRadio Music Awards	2023	"As It Was"	TikTok Bop of the Year	Nominated	
iHeartRadio Music Awards	2023	Himself	Artist of the Year	Won	
iHeartRadio Music Awards	2023	Himself	Favorite Tour Style	Won	
iHeartRadio Music Awards	2024	Himself	Favorite Tour Style	Nominated	
iHeartRadio Titanium Awards	2020	"Adore You"	1 Billion Total Audience Spins on iHeartRadio Stations	Won	
iHeartRadio Titanium Awards	2021	"Watermelon Sugar"	1 Billion Total Audience Spins on iHeartRadio Stations	Won	
iHeartRadio Titanium Awards	2022	"As It Was"	1 Billion Total Audience Spins on iHeartRadio Stations	Won	
Ivor Novello Awards	2021	"Adore You"	PRS for Music Most Performed Work	Won	
Ivor Novello Awards	2021	"Watermelon Sugar"	PRS for Music Most Performed Work	Nominated	
Ivor Novello Awards	2021	Himself (with Kid Harpoon)	Songwriter of the Year	Nominated	
Ivor Novello Awards	2023	Himself (with Kid Harpoon)	Songwriter of the Year	Nominated	
Ivor Novello Awards	2023	"As It Was"	PRS for Music Most Performed Work	Won	
Ivor Novello Awards	2023	"As It Was"	Best Song Musically & Lyrically	Nominated	
Joox Thailand Music Awards	2022	Himself	Top Social Global Artist of the Year	Nominated	
Juno Awards	2021	Fine Line	International Album of the Year	Won	
Juno Awards	2023	Harry's House	International Album of the Year	Won	
Los 40 Music Awards	2017	Himself	Best International New Artist	Nominated	
Los 40 Music Awards	2017	Himself	Lo+40 Artist	Nominated	
Los 40 Music Awards	2017	Harry Styles	Best International Album	Nominated	
Los 40 Music Awards	2020	Fine Line	Best International Album	Nominated	
Los 40 Music Awards	2020	Himself	Best International Artist	Nominated	
Los 40 Music Awards	2022	Himself	Best International Artist	Nominated	
Los 40 Music Awards	2022	Himself	Best Live Act	Nominated	
Los 40 Music Awards	2022	Harry's House	Best International Album	Won	
Los 40 Music Awards	2022	"As It Was"	Best International Song	Nominated	
Los 40 Music Awards	2022	"As It Was"	Best International Video	Nominated	
Melon Music Awards	2020	"Watermelon Sugar"	Best Pop	Nominated	
Mercury Prize	2022	Harry's House	Album of the Year	Shortlisted	
Meus Prêmios Nick	2017	"Sign of the Times"	Favorite International Hit	Nominated	
Meus Prêmios Nick	2017	"Sign of the Times"	Favorite International Music Video	Nominated	
Meus Prêmios Nick	2018	Himself	Favorite International Artist	Nominated	
MTV Europe Music Awards	2013	Himself	Best Look	Won	
MTV Europe Music Awards	2017	Himself	Best Look	Nominated	
MTV Europe Music Awards	2020	Himself	Best Artist	Nominated	
MTV Europe Music Awards	2020	Himself	Best Pop	Nominated	
MTV Europe Music Awards	2020	Himself	Best UK & Ireland Act	Nominated	
MTV Europe Music Awards	2022	"As It Was"	Best Song	Nominated	
MTV Europe Music Awards	2022	"As It Was"	Best Video	Nominated	
MTV Europe Music Awards	2022	Himself	Best Artist	Nominated	
MTV Europe Music Awards	2022	Himself	Best Pop	Nominated	
MTV Europe Music Awards	2022	Himself	Best Live	Won	
MTV Europe Music Awards	2022	Himself	Best UK & Ireland Act	Won	
MTV Europe Music Awards	2022	Himself	Biggest Fans	Nominated	
MTV Italian Music Awards	2014	Himself	Best Look	Nominated	
MTV Millennial Awards	2013	Himself	Celebrity Without Filter on Instagram	Won	
MTV Millennial Awards	2014	Himself	Global Instagrammer	Nominated	
MTV Millennial Awards	2021	Himself	Celebrity Crush	Nominated	
MTV Millennial Awards	2021	"Golden"	Global Hit of the Year	Won	
MTV Millennial Awards Brazil	2020	Himself	Fandom of the Year	Nominated	
MTV Millennial Awards Brazil	2020	"Watermelon Sugar"	Global Hit	Nominated	
MTV Movie & TV Awards	2023	Don't Worry Darling (Jack Chambers)	Best Villain	Nominated	
MTV Movie & TV Awards	2023	My Policeman	Best Kiss	Nominated	
MTV Video Music Awards	2017	"Sign of the Times"	Best Pop	Nominated	
MTV Video Music Awards	2017	"Sign of the Times"	Best Visual Effects	Nominated	
MTV Video Music Awards	2020	"Adore You"	Best Visual Effects	Nominated	
MTV Video Music Awards	2020	"Adore You"	Best Art Direction	Nominated	
MTV Video Music Awards	2020	"Adore You"	Best Direction	Nominated	
MTV Video Music Awards	2020	"Watermelon Sugar"	Song of Summer	Nominated	
MTV Video Music Awards	2021	"Treat People with Kindness"	Best Editing	Nominated	
MTV Video Music Awards	2021	"Treat People with Kindness"	Best Pop	Nominated	
MTV Video Music Awards	2021	"Treat People with Kindness"	Best Choreography	Won	
MTV Video Music Awards	2022	"As It Was"	Best Choreography	Nominated	
MTV Video Music Awards	2022	"As It Was"	Video of the Year	Nominated	
MTV Video Music Awards	2022	"As It Was"	Best Pop	Won	
MTV Video Music Awards	2022	"As It Was"	Best Cinematography	Won	
MTV Video Music Awards	2022	"As It Was"	Best Direction	Nominated	
MTV Video Music Awards	2022	"Late Night Talking"	Song of Summer	Nominated	
MTV Video Music Awards	2022	Himself	Artist of the Year	Nominated	
MTV Video Music Awards	2022	Harry's House	Album of the Year	Won	
MTV Video Music Awards	2023	"Music for a Sushi Restaurant"	Best Visual Effects	Nominated	
MTV Video Music Awards	2026	"Aperture"	Best Dance	Nominated	
MTV Video Music Awards	2026	"Dance No More"	Best Choreography	Nominated	
MTV Video Music Awards	2026	Kiss All the Time. Disco, Occasionally	Best Album	Nominated	
MTV Video Music Awards Japan	2022	"As It Was"	Best Solo Artist Video - International	Won	
Music Producers Guild Awards	2018	"Sign of the Times"	UK Single Song Release of the Year	Nominated	
Music Producers Guild Awards	2021	"Adore You"	UK Single Song Release of the Year	Nominated	
Music Producers Guild Awards	2023	Harry's House	UK Album of the Year	Won	
Music Week Awards	2020	Himself & Columbia Records	Artist Marketing Campaign	Won	
MVPA Awards	2020	"Adore You"	Best Pop Video	Won	
MVPA Awards	2020	"Adore You"	Best Cinematography in a Video	Nominated	
MVPA Awards	2020	"Adore You"	Best Visual Effects in a Video	Nominated	
MVPA Awards	2020	"Adore You"	Best Colour Grading in a Video	Nominated	
MVPA Awards	2020	"Watermelon Sugar"	Best Colour Grading in a Video	Nominated	
MVPA Awards	2022	"As It Was"	Best Pop Video	Won	
Myx Music Awards	2018	"Sign of the Times"	Favorite International Video	Nominated	
Myx Music Awards	2021	"Watermelon Sugar"	Favorite International Video	Nominated	
National Film Awards UK	2018	Himself	Best Breakthrough Performance	Nominated	
National Film Awards UK	2018	Himself	Best Newcomer	Nominated	
Nickelodeon Australian Kids' Choice Awards	2013	Himself	Aussies' Fave Hottie	Nominated	
Nickelodeon Australian Kids' Choice Awards	2014	Himself	Aussies' Fave Hottie	Won	
Nickelodeon Kids' Choice Awards	2018	Himself	Favorite Breakout Artist	Nominated	
Nickelodeon Kids' Choice Awards	2021	Himself	Favorite Male Artist	Nominated	
Nickelodeon Kids' Choice Awards	2023	Himself	Favorite Male Artist	Won	
Nickelodeon Kids' Choice Awards	2023	Himself	Global Music Star	Won	
Nickelodeon Kids' Choice Awards	2023	"As It Was"	Favorite Song	Won	
Nickelodeon Kids' Choice Awards	2023	Harry's House	Favorite Album	Nominated	
Nickelodeon Kids' Choice Awards	2026	Himself	Favorite Male Artist	Pending	
Nickelodeon Mexico Kids' Choice Awards	2017	Himself	Favorite International Artist	Nominated	
Nickelodeon Mexico Kids' Choice Awards	2018	Himself	Favorite International Artist	Nominated	
Nickelodeon Mexico Kids' Choice Awards	2020	"Watermelon Sugar"	Global Hit	Nominated	
Nickelodeon Mexico Kids' Choice Awards	2021	"Golden"	Global Hit	Nominated	
Nickelodeon Mexico Kids' Choice Awards	2022	Himself	Favorite Global Artist	Nominated	
Nickelodeon Mexico Kids' Choice Awards	2022	"As It Was"	International Hit of the Year	Nominated	
NME Awards	2013	Himself	Villain of the Year	Won	
NME Awards	2014	Himself	Villain of the Year	Won	
NME Awards	2015	Himself	Villain of the Year	Nominated	
NRJ Music Awards	2017	Himself	International Breakthrough of the Year	Nominated	
NRJ Music Awards	2020	Himself	International Male Artist of the Year	Nominated	
NRJ Music Awards	2020	"Watermelon Sugar"	Music Video of the Year	Nominated	
NRJ Music Awards	2022	Himself	International Male Artist	Nominated	
NRJ Music Awards	2022	"As It Was"	International Video of the Year	Won	
NRJ Music Awards	2022	"As It Was"	International Song of the Year	Won	
NRJ Music Awards	2026	Himself	International Male Artist of the Year	Pending	
People's Choice Awards	2018	Himself	Style Star	Won	
People's Choice Awards	2019	Himself	Style Star	Won	
People's Choice Awards	2022	Himself	Drama Movie Star of 2022	Nominated	
People's Choice Awards	2022	Himself	Male Artist of 2022	Won	
People's Choice Awards	2022	Harry's House	Album of 2022	Nominated	
People's Choice Awards	2022	Love On Tour	Concert Tour of 2022	Nominated	
People's Choice Awards	2022	"As It Was"	Song of 2022	Nominated	
People's Choice Awards	2022	"As It Was"	Music Video of 2022	Nominated	
Pollstar Awards	2018	Himself	Pop Tour of the Year	Nominated	
Pollstar Awards	2018	Himself	Best New Headliner	Nominated	
Pollstar Awards	2021	Love On Tour	Best Pop Tour	Nominated	
Pollstar Awards	2021	Love On Tour	Major Tour of the Year	Won	
Pollstar Awards	2023	Love On Tour	Major Tour of the Year	Won	
Pollstar Awards	2023	Love On Tour	Brand Partnership/Live Campaign of the Year	Won	
Pollstar Awards	2023	Love On Tour	Per Cap Award	Won	
Pollstar Awards	2023	Love On Tour	Live Music is Better Award	Nominated	
Pollstar Awards	2023	Love On Tour	Residency of the Year	Won	
Pollstar Awards	2023	Love On Tour	Pop Tour of the Year	Nominated	
Premios MUSA	2022	"As It Was"	International Anglo Song of the Year	Won	
Premios MUSA	2022	Himself	International Anglo Artist of the Year	Nominated	
Premios Odeón	2021	Himself	Best International Artist	Nominated	
Premios Odeón	2023	Harry's House	Best International Album	Won	
Qmusic Top 40 Awards	2023	"As It Was"	Internacional Song of the Year	Won	
Rockbjörnen	2017	"Sign of the Times"	Foreign Song of the Year	Nominated	
Rockbjörnen	2018	Harry Styles: Live on Tour	Concert of the Year	Nominated	
Rockbjörnen	2020	"Adore You"	Foreign Song of the Year	Nominated	
Rolling Stone UK Awards	2026	Kiss All the Time. Disco, Occasionally	The Album Award	Nominated	
RTHK International Pop Poll Awards	2021	"Watermelon Sugar"	Top Ten International Gold Songs	Nominated	
RTHK International Pop Poll Awards	2021	Himself	Top Male Artist	Nominated	
RTHK International Pop Poll Awards	2022	Himself	Top Male Singer	Won	
Shorty Awards	2019	Himself	Best in Music	Nominated	
Shorty Awards	2022	Love On Tour x MSG Social Campaign	Social Media Campaign	Nominated	
Silver Clef Awards	2018	Himself	Best Live Act	Won	
Swiss Music Awards	2023	Harry's House	Best Solo Act International	Won	
Swiss Music Awards	2023	"As It Was"	Best Hit International	Won	
TEC Awards	2021	"Adore You"	Record Production - Single or Track	Nominated	
Teen Choice Awards	2013	Himself	Choice Male Hottie	Won	
Teen Choice Awards	2013	Himself	Choice Smile	Won	
Teen Choice Awards	2014	Himself	Choice Smile	Won	
Teen Choice Awards	2016	Himself	Choice Male Hottie	Won	
Teen Choice Awards	2017	Himself	Choice Male Artist	Won	
Teen Choice Awards	2017	Himself	Choice Rock Artist	Won	
Teen Choice Awards	2017	Himself	Choice Style Icon	Won	
Teen Choice Awards	2017	Himself	Choice Breakout Movie Star	Nominated	
Teen Choice Awards	2017	Himself	Choice Male Hottie	Nominated	
Teen Choice Awards	2017	"Sign of the Times"	Choice Song: Male Artist	Nominated	
Teen Choice Awards	2017	Himself	Choice Summer Male Artist	Nominated	
Teen Choice Awards	2017	Himself	Choice Summer Movie Actor	Nominated	
Teen Choice Awards	2018	Himself	Choice Style Icon	Won	
Teen Choice Awards	2018	Harry Styles: Live on Tour	Choice Summer Tour	Won	
Ticketmaster Awards	2023	Himself	UK Live Act of the Year	Nominated	
TIFF Tribute Awards	2022	My Policeman	TIFF Tribute Award for Performance	Won	
UK Music Video Awards	2020	"Adore You"	Best Pop Video - UK	Nominated	
UK Music Video Awards	2020	"Falling"	Best Pop Video - UK	Nominated	
UK Music Video Awards	2022	"As It Was"	Best Pop Video - UK	Won	
UK Music Video Awards	2026	"Aperture	Best Pop Video - UK	Pending	
UK Music Video Awards	2026	"Aperture	Best Performance in a Video	Pending	
Variety's Hitmakers Awards	2020	Himself	Hitmaker of the Year	Won	
Washington D.C. Area Film Critics Association	2017	Dunkirk	Best Ensemble	Nominated	
Webby Awards	2021	Harry Styles Crosswalk Concert	Music Video	Nominated	
Webby Awards	2023	AirPods - Silhouettes x Harry Styles	Best Individual Performance, Performances & Craft (Video)	Nominated	
Webby Awards	2023	Love On Tour x MSG Social Campaign	Best Campaign - Entertainment & Performances	Nominated	
Webby Awards	2023	Love On Tour x MSG Social Campaign	Best Campaign - Events & Livestreams	Won	
Žebřík Music Awards	2021	Himself	Best International Male	Nominated	
Žebřík Music Awards	2021	"Adore You"	Best International Video	Won	
Žebřík Music Awards	2023	"Daylight"	Best International Video	Silver	
Žebřík Music Awards	2023	"Daylight"	Best International Song	Bronze	
Žebřík Music Awards	2023	Harry's House	Best International Album	Gold	
Žebřík Music Awards	2023	Himself	Best Foreign Singer	Bronze	
