= Serena Göransson =

American violinist and music producer

- Born: Serena McKinney
- Origin: American Fork, Utah, U.S.
- Genres: Classical; Film score
- Occupations: Violinist; music producer
- Instrument: Violin
- Spouse: Ludwig Göransson

Serena Göransson (née McKinney) is an American violinist and music producer. She has worked as a session violinist on film, television and pop recordings, and produced music for the films Sinners (2025) and The Odyssey (2026). Some of her earlier work is credited under the name Serena McKinney.

== Early life and education ==
McKinney grew up in American Fork, Utah, and began playing the violin at the age of three. At 16 she performed Tchaikovsky's Violin Concerto with the Utah Symphony at its Salute to Youth concert. She later studied with Robert Lipsett at the Colburn School in Los Angeles.

== Career ==
As a session musician, McKinney was a concertmaster for the score of the first season of The Mandalorian (2019). She played violin on Harry Styles's "Treat People with Kindness" from Fine Line (2019) and strings on Adele's "Strangers by Nature" from 30 (2021). She performed the solo violin parts in her husband's score for Christopher Nolan's Oppenheimer (2023), and the two later rearranged the score for a live concert version of the film.

She was the executive music producer on Ryan Coogler's Sinners and produced the film's songs, many of them recorded in Memphis. The soundtrack album, on which she was credited as a compilation producer with Coogler and Ludwig Göransson, won Best Compilation Soundtrack for Visual Media at the 68th Annual Grammy Awards in 2026. She was the score producer for The Odyssey, Christopher Nolan's 2026 film.

== Selected credits ==
Year	Title	Role
2019	The Mandalorian (season 1)	Concertmaster
2019	Fine Line – Harry Styles	Violin
2021	30 – Adele	Strings
2023	Oppenheimer	Solo violin
2025	Sinners	Executive music producer, compilation producer
2026	The Odyssey	Score producer

== Awards ==
Year	Award	Category	Work	Result
2026	Grammy Awards	Best Compilation Soundtrack for Visual Media	Sinners	Won
