= Fine Line (Harry Styles song) =

2021 single by Harry Styles

Single by Harry Styles

from the album Fine Line
- Released: 19 November 2021
- Genre: Chamber folk; folk-pop
- Length: 6:17
- Label: Erskine; Columbia
- Songwriters: Harry Styles; Thomas Hull; Tyler Johnson; Mitch Rowland; Sammy Witte
- Producers: Kid Harpoon; Tyler Johnson

Harry Styles singles chronology
"Treat People with Kindness" (2021)	"Fine Line" (2021)	"As It Was" (2022)

"Fine Line" is a song by English singer-songwriter Harry Styles, recorded for his second studio album of the same name. Styles wrote the song with Mitch Rowland, Sammy Witte and producers Kid Harpoon and Tyler Johnson. "Fine Line" was later sent to Italian radio on 19 November 2021, as the album's seventh and final single.

== Background and release ==
On 13 December 2019, Harry Styles released his second studio album, Fine Line. Styles wrote the song with Mitch Rowland, Sammy Witte, and producers Kid Harpoon and Tyler Johnson.

Styles originally wrote "Fine Line" as a folk ballad, but he explained to Rolling Stone that it kept expanding and evolving. "It started simple, but I wanted to have this other, epic thing. And it took that shape," he said. "It's exactly the kind of music I want to make. I love strings, horns, and harmonies. So why not put it all in?". In Italy, Sony Music released "Fine Line" as the seventh single from Fine Line on 19 November 2021.

== Critical reception ==
Hannah Mylrea of NME called "Fine Line" "euphoric". Douglas Greenwood of i-D wrote that the song "houses all the same lyrical intensity but on a larger sonic scale". Jon Pareles of The New York Times wrote that the "song makes carefully optimistic promises and unfolds over six minutes with wonderful patience, eventually summoning an orchestra. Free of his boy band, Styles exults in sound, not image".

Alex Rodobolski of Exclaim! wrote: "it's the perfect way to end his tale of woe and horniness. It’s happy and sad, romantic, disdainful, and beautiful all at once". Nick Catucci of Rolling Stone wrote that the song "emerges from a beautiful, Bon Iver-type haze into a big, semi-hopeful ending with a measure of uncertainty that fits the end of this chaotic decade, as Styles promises: 'We'll be alright'". Maddie Lock of The Edge wrote that while the song "is certainly catchy, it is probably the most forgettable and unnecessary song on the album".

== Charts ==
Chart performance for "Fine Line"
Chart (2019)	Peak position
Australia (ARIA)	95
Lithuania (AGATA)	72
US Bubbling Under Hot 100 (Billboard)	11

== Certifications ==
Certifications and sales for "Fine Line"
Region	Certification	Certified units/sales
Australia (ARIA)	Platinum	70,000^{‡}
Brazil (Pro-Música Brasil)	Platinum	40,000^{‡}
Denmark (IFPI Danmark)	Gold	45,000^{‡}
France (SNEP)	Gold	100,000^{‡}
Mexico (AMPROFON)	2× Platinum+Gold	150,000^{‡}
New Zealand (RMNZ)	Platinum	30,000^{‡}
Poland (ZPAV)	Gold	25,000^{‡}
United Kingdom (BPI)	Platinum	600,000^{‡}
United States (RIAA)	Platinum	1,000,000^{‡}
^{‡} Sales+streaming figures based on certification alone.

== Release history ==
"Fine Line" release history
Region	Date	Format(s)	Label(s)	Ref.
Italy	19 November 2021	Radio airplay	Sony	
