= Lights Up =

2019 single by Harry Styles

Single by Harry Styles

from the album Fine Line
- B-side: "Do You Know Who You Are?"
- Released: 11 October 2019
- Studio: The Cave, Nashville; EastWest, Los Angeles; Henson, Hollywood
- Genre: Pop; R&B
- Length: 2:52
- Label: Erskine; Columbia
- Songwriters: Harry Styles; Thomas Hull; Tyler Johnson
- Producers: Tyler Johnson; Thomas Hull

Harry Styles singles chronology
"Kiwi" (2017)	"Lights Up" (2019)	"Adore You" (2019)

Music video
- "Lights Up" on YouTube

"Lights Up" is a song by English singer-songwriter Harry Styles from his second studio album, Fine Line (2019). It was written by Styles alongside its producers Tyler Johnson and Kid Harpoon. Erskine Records and Columbia Records released the song for digital download and streaming on 11 October 2019 as the album's lead single. Musically, "Lights Up" is a pop and R&B song, featuring multilayered guitars, piano, programmed beats, and a gospel choir. Conceived by Styles after a period of self-reflection, the lyrics are about self-discovery and him embracing his own identity.

Critics found Styles's musical direction refreshing and commented on the song's unconventional structure which is composed of several breakdown pre-choruses and post-choruses, and a single chorus. A few others criticised the song as forgettable. In the UK, the single reached number three on the UK Singles Chart and was certified Platinum by the British Phonographic Industry (BPI). It also peaked in the top 20 and received Platinum certifications in Australia, Canada, and the US. Vincent Haycock directed the song's music video, which features Styles dancing shirtless in a sweat-drenched crowd of people.

== Writing and production ==
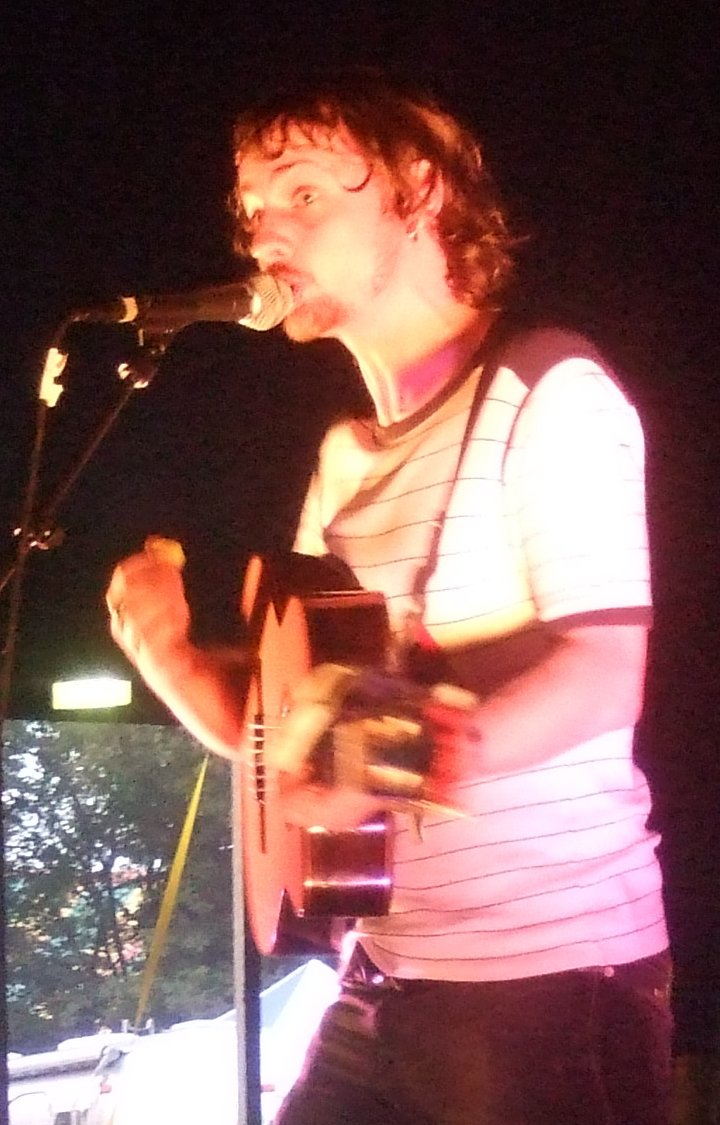
Kid Harpoon co-wrote and co-produced "Lights Up".

Formerly a member of the boy band One Direction, Harry Styles emerged as a solo artist in 2017 with his self-titled debut studio album, which heavily incorporated a 1970s rock-influenced sound. During an interview with Zane Lowe of Apple Music, Styles admitted that he was stressed while making his debut album. He said: "When I listen to the first album now, I can hear all of the places where I feel like I was playing it safe, because I just didn't want to get it wrong". He disliked feeling obligated to create a record to appease the listeners and decided to be "more fun and adventurous" with his next project. For his second album Fine Line, released in 2019, Styles enlisted producers Tyler Johnson and Kid Harpoon, with whom he had worked on his debut album. A pop rock record encompassing power pop, folk rock, psychedelic pop, and funk influences, Fine Line turned out to be more experimental than his debut album, according to Vox's Alexa Lee. The song "Lights Up" has a more pop-like sound than the songs on Harry Styles.

While talking to Rolling Stone magazine, Styles said that "Lights Up" was created after "a long period of self-reflection, self-acceptance". It was conceived during songwriting sessions for the album in the first quarter of 2019. Styles wrote the song with Johnson and Harpoon, who is credited under his birth name Thomas Hull in the liner notes. Production was handled by all the songwriters except Styles.

The recording took place in The Cave Studio in Nashville, EastWest Studios in Los Angeles, and Henson Recording in Hollywood. Johnson programmed the track and played drums, bass guitar, acoustic guitar, and keyboards; Harpoon also played electric guitar and provided additional production while Ivan Jackson played the horns. Johnson, Jeremy Hatcher, Nick Lobel, and Sammy Witte engineered the song with Matt Tuggle and Matt Wallick. Jon Castelli mixed it with help from Ingmar Carlson at The Gift Shop in Los Angeles. Randy Merrill mastered it at Sterling Sound Studios in Edgewater, New Jersey.

== Music and lyrics ==
"Lights Up"
A 16-second sample of the refrain with gospel choir and repeating lead-vocal melody and lyric

"Lights Up" is a pop and R&B song, with a length of two minutes and 52 seconds. Critic Jon Caramanica of The New York Times characterised its sound as "somewhere between '70s soft rock, lite disco and indie pop". Along with these, NME's Hannah Mylrea noted soul influences in the song. The track incorporates multilayered guitars, piano, and programmed beats with a supple bassline. The refrain is accompanied by a gospel choir. The Independent's Roisin O'Connor said the track has "California Dreamin'" vibes and psychedelic grooves. Slate writer Chris Molanphy described the song as "lightly strummed beach music with ethereal backing vocals".

"Lights Up" eschews traditional song structures and is composed of several breakdown pre-choruses and post-choruses, and a single chorus. The song opens with a 17-second instrumental introduction, which is followed by a beat at 00:19 and then the track's opening verse. A guitar-driven pitch drift takes place at 00:28, and is accompanied by Styles's tightly tuned vocals. His voice is distorted in the pre-chorus. The central chorus, which begins at 1:18, is uptempo and uses a repeating lead-vocal melody and lyric; it is led by a backing-vocal refrain that begins with "Shine". The track reaches a crescendo shortly before the outro. The song uses a layered vocal texture with a doubling of vocal lines at the upper and lower octaves. O'Connor described Styles's vocals as "surprisingly airy", which she said contrast with his "sharper delivery" in his earlier work. Critics from Billboard, The Guardian, MTV News, and The New York Times compared the song's musical style to that of the psychedelic music group Tame Impala, while those from NME and Variety said that it sounded like the early works of the R&B-pop singer Justin Timberlake.

The lyrics of "Lights Up" discuss self-discovery and self-acceptance. Some critics thought the song was a commentary on Styles's fame. In the song, Styles embraces his own identity, singing "Lights up and they know who you are / Know who you are / Do you know who you are?" The lyrics in the refrain have a personal revelation from him: "Step into the light ... I'm not ever going back". According to Laura Snapes of The Guardian, he talks through a "conflicted inner monologue" and the lyrics find "him and a former partner talking at cross-purposes around the void of a relationship". Now writer Rea McNamara said that the song was "an all-too-brief ode to self-love and letting go", and in the words of Vulture critic Craig Jenkins, it is about "piercing the darkness in our hearts with radiant light". Tallahassee Democrat's Jia Alonso and The Washington Post's Anying Guo associated the song's lyrics to be vaguely about Styles's sexuality. Editorials reviews by Paper and Time noted a melancholic edge to the lyrics.

== Release and promotion ==
Prior to the release of "Lights Up", Styles launched a campaign on 10 October 2019, World Mental Health Day. Billboards bearing the Columbia Records logo and the caption "Do You Know Who You Are?", were erected in London and New York. The billboards also bore the acronym "TPWK" (Treat People with Kindness), a phrase that had earlier been used on the merchandise of Harry Styles: Live on Tour. The caption was later revealed as the title of the song "Treat People with Kindness" from the album Fine Line. A website titled with the same phrase was also set up; it offered compliments to users who entered their names into it. Styles announced the title of the single on his Instagram account with a photo of himself. Erskine Records and Columbia Records released "Lights Up" for digital download and streaming on 11 October 2019 in various countries as the lead single from his second album Fine Line. The same day, the song was added to a BBC Radio 1 playlist, and contemporary hit radio stations in Australia and Italy. A limited-edition 7-inch single containing a new track called "Do You Know Who You Are? (Locked Groove)" on the B-side was issued worldwide in early 2020.

On 16 November 2019, Styles delivered his first performance of "Lights Up" on Saturday Night Live, along with "Watermelon Sugar". For the performance, he rendered "Lights Up" in a stripped-down, R&B style; he was accompanied by a trumpeter, backing vocalists, and a live band. Hilary Hughes of Billboard praised the performance, writing: "With little more than the piano, an acoustic guitar, a trumpet and the intricate harmonies of his back-up singers, Styles belted every high note and danced to the beat of the song's bridge". Styles performed the track again on Later... with Jools Holland on 21 November and at Capital FM's Jingle Bell Ball on 7 December. The song was included on the setlist of his one-night concert at the Forum in Los Angeles on 13 December to promote the release of Fine Line. On 18 December, Styles performed the single on BBC Radio 1's Live Lounge segment. On 29 February the following year, he sang it at the Music Hall of Williamsburg for SiriusXM and Pandora's secret session.

== Critical reception ==
Some critics commended Styles for experimenting with different styles. Time and Vulture named "Lights Up" as one of the best songs of its release week. Snapes praised the song's refreshing sound that distinguished Styles from his British male contemporaries and from the "narcotised" synth-pop-dominated sounds of that year, with Time's Raisa Bruner regarding it as an example of his versatility. Caramanica described "Lights Up" as a generous return to the pop that played to Styles's strengths. The Atlantic's Spencer Koornhaber said the track rendered the type of eerie yet simple listening territory that had seldom been explored since Donovan's "Mellow Yellow". O'Connor called it Styles's most self-confident song yet. To explain this viewpoint, she highlighted that Styles's identity often felt lost in the middle of musical tropes on his debut album. Contrastingly, O'Connor argued that "Lights Up" stood out on its own.

Critics also commented on the song's unconventional structure and arrangement. According to Pitchfork writer Anna Gaca, the track was "designed to wriggle through the strictures of pop songwriting", and Chris DeVille from Stereogum claimed that it showed Styles's ability to "toy around with accessible sounds without descending into the blasé". The detailed arrangement of horns, congas, and choir on the song was noted approvingly by Clash editor Susan Hansen, who selected "Lights Up" as the best track on Fine Line and praised its "subtle, but acute build up". In a similar vein, Loiuse Bruton from The Irish Times complimented the song production-wise. Variety's Chris Willman picked it as one of the "distinct modern outliers" on the album, alongside "Adore You" and "Watermelon Sugar".

Andrew Unterberger was more critical in his review for Billboard in which he singled out the song's direction as deceptive and wrote that the track "never quite tells you where it's going and then leaves you off somewhere you don't even recognise". Tim Sendra of AllMusic called the single "inoffensive and sweet", saying it was "only saved from the skip button by the always impressive vocals". Paste writer Ellen Johnson dismissed it as not "necessarily anything special".

== Commercial performance ==
"Lights Up" entered and peaked at number three on the 18 October 2019 issue of the UK Singles Chart, Styles's second top-10 entry on the chart after "Sign of the Times" (2017). In July 2021, the British Phonographic Industry (BPI) certified the song Platinum for 600,000 track-equivalent units. The song reached number four on the Irish Singles Chart, becoming Styles's second Irish top-10 entry. In Australia, the song charted at number seven on the singles chart, and was certified 2× Platinum by the Australian Recording Industry Association (ARIA) for sales of 140,000 equivalent units. The song peaked in the same position in New Zealand and received a double Platinum certification from Recorded Music NZ (RMNZ).

In the United States, "Lights Up" debuted and peaked at number 17 on the Billboard Hot 100 chart dated 26 October 2019, accumulating 21.5 million streams and 20,000 download sales in its opening week. It was Styles's third Hot 100 chart appearance following "Sweet Creature". The Recording Industry Association of America (RIAA) certified the song double Platinum for track-equivalent sales of two million units. In Canada, "Lights Up" peaked at number 14 on the Hot 100 and was certified Platinum by Music Canada. The song reached number three in Lithuania, number four in Greece and Latvia, number six in both Scotland and Slovakia, and number nine in Hungary. It peaked inside the top 20 at number 12 in Iceland, number 14 in Singapore, number 15 in Malaysia and Sweden, number 16 in Austria and Norway, number 20 in Finland; and peaked within the top 40 in Denmark, Italy, the Netherlands, Poland, Portugal, and Switzerland. In Brazil, the single was certified Diamond.

== Music video ==
Vincent Haycock directed the music video for "Lights Up", which was filmed in Cancun, Mexico in August 2019. It premiered on Styles's Vevo account on 11 October 2019, the same day as the song's release. The video shows Styles dancing shirtless at a bacchanal in a crowd of sweat-drenched people of all genders. The dancers drape themselves over him, "gently jostling and caressing each other" as he throws his head back in ecstasy. The video switches between scenes of Styles alone and with the dancers. Some scenes show him riding on the back of a motorcycle with outstretched arms, and standing alone in a house. Styles is also seen wading in the sea while bathed in red light and wearing a black, sequined blazer. Later in the video, he stares at his own reflection while being hung upside down. The video ends with an encounter between Styles and some police officers. The visual mostly takes place in darkness with occasional uses of neon red, pastel pink, and blue filters.

The video suggests people "having sex and feeling sad", which is how Styles described the album to Rolling Stone. Alonso noted swift transitions between every scene in the music video which has Styles as the central point of every location change. Georgia Slater of People said the visual portrays a more emotional side of Styles, with Dylan Kelly from V calling Styles's "authentically carefree identity" in the video "a celebration of [his] personal journey of self-discovery". W's Jocelyn Silver described the visual as "a steamy, moody, Ryan McGinley-esque piece of work". Rolling Stone's Claire Shaffer placed the video on her list of the best music videos of 2019.

== Track listing ==
- 7-inch
1. "Lights Up" – 2:52
2. "Do You Know Who You Are? " (Locked Groove)

== Credits and personnel ==
Credits are adapted from the liner notes of Fine Line.

=== Recording ===
- Recorded at The Cave Studio (Nashville, Tennessee), EastWest Studios (Los Angeles, California), and Henson Recording Studios (Hollywood, California)
- Mixed at The Gift Shop (Los Angeles, California)
- Mastered at Sterling Sound (Edgewater, New Jersey)

=== Personnel ===
- Harry Styles – vocals, songwriting, backing vocals
- Tyler Johnson – songwriting, production, backing vocals, drums, drum programming, bass, acoustic guitar, keyboards, engineering
- Thomas Hull – songwriting, electric guitar, additional production
- Jason White – choir, contractor
- Brandon Winbush – choir
- Nikisha Daniel – choir
- Tiffany Smith – choir
- Tiffany Stevenson – choir
- Ivan Jackson – horn
- Jeremy Hatcher – engineering
- Nick Lobel – engineering
- Sammy Witte – engineering
- Matt Tuggle – assistant engineering
- Matt Wallick – assistant engineering
- Jon Castelli – mixing
- Ingmar Carlson – mix assistant
- Randy Merrill – mastering

== Charts ==
=== Weekly charts ===
Weekly chart performance of "Lights Up"
Chart (2019–2020)	Peak position
Australia (ARIA)	7
Austria (Ö3 Austria Top 40)	16
Belgium (Ultratip Bubbling Under Flanders)	2
Belgium (Ultratip Bubbling Under Wallonia)	4
Canada Hot 100 (Billboard)	14
Czech Republic Singles Digital (ČNS IFPI)	10
Denmark (Tracklisten)	30
Estonia (Eesti Tipp-40)	5
Euro Digital Song Sales (Billboard)	3
Finland (Suomen virallinen lista)	20
France (SNEP)	127
Germany (GfK)	50
Greece (IFPI)	4
Hungary (Single Top 40)	9
Hungary (Stream Top 40)	6
Iceland (Tónlistinn)	12
Ireland (IRMA)	4
Italy (FIMI)	37
Latvia (LAIPA)	4
Lithuania (AGATA)	3
Malaysia (RIM)	15
Mexico Ingles Airplay (Billboard)	30
Netherlands (Single Top 100)	36
New Zealand (Recorded Music NZ)	7
Norway (VG-lista)	16
Poland Airplay (ZPAV)	29
Portugal (AFP)	23
San Marino (SMRRTV Top 50)	41
Scottish Singles Sales (Official Charts)	6
Singapore (RIAS)	14
Slovakia Singles Digital (ČNS IFPI)	6
Spain (Promusicae)	65
Sweden (Sverigetopplistan)	15
Switzerland (Schweizer Hitparade)	22
UK Singles (Official Charts)	3
US Billboard Hot 100	17
US Rolling Stone Top 100	4

2024 weekly chart performance for "Lights Up"
Chart (2024)	Peak position
Moldova Airplay (TopHit)	93

=== Year-end charts ===
Year-end chart performance of "Lights Up"
Chart (2019)	Position
Hungary (Stream Top 40)	86
Latvia (LAIPA)	94

== Certifications ==
Certifications and sales for "Lights Up"
Region	Certification	Certified units/sales
Australia (ARIA)	2× Platinum	140,000^{‡}
Austria (IFPI Austria)	Gold	15,000^{‡}
Brazil (Pro-Música Brasil)	Diamond	160,000^{‡}
Canada (Music Canada)	2× Platinum	160,000^{‡}
Denmark (IFPI Danmark)	Gold	45,000^{‡}
Italy (FIMI)	Gold	35,000^{‡}
Mexico (AMPROFON)	3× Platinum	180,000^{‡}
New Zealand (RMNZ)	2× Platinum	60,000^{‡}
Norway (IFPI Norway)	Gold	30,000^{‡}
Poland (ZPAV)	Platinum	20,000^{‡}
Portugal (AFP)	Gold	5,000^{‡}
United Kingdom (BPI)	Platinum	600,000^{‡}
United States (RIAA)	2× Platinum	2,000,000^{‡}
^{‡} Sales+streaming figures based on certification alone.

== Release history ==
Release dates and formats for "Lights Up"
Region	Date	Format(s)	Label(s)	Ref.
Various	11 October 2019	Digital download; streaming	Erskine; Columbia	
Italy	11 October 2019	Radio airplay	Sony	
United Kingdom	11 October 2019	Contemporary hit radio	Erskine; Columbia	
Various	Early 2020	7-inch vinyl	Erskine; Columbia	
