= Watermelon Sugar =

2020 single by Harry Styles

Single by Harry Styles

from the album Fine Line
- Released: 16 November 2019
- Studio: Real World (Bath, Somerset); RAK (London); The Cave (Nashville); Henson (Hollywood); Harpoon House (Los Angeles)
- Genre: Pop rock; funk-pop
- Length: 2:53
- Label: Erskine; Columbia
- Songwriters: Harry Styles; Mitch Rowland; Tyler Johnson; Thomas Hull
- Producers: Johnson; Kid Harpoon

Harry Styles singles chronology
"Falling" (2020)	"Watermelon Sugar" (2019)	"Golden" (2020)

Music video
- "Watermelon Sugar" on YouTube

"Watermelon Sugar" is a song by English singer-songwriter Harry Styles from his second studio album, Fine Line (2019), included as the album's second track. Styles wrote the song with Mitch Rowland and the song's producers, Tyler Johnson and Kid Harpoon. They were inspired by the American novel In Watermelon Sugar (1968) by Richard Brautigan. "Watermelon Sugar" is a horn and guitar-driven funk-pop, pop rock song.

Originally released as a promotional single from Fine Line on 16 November 2019, "Watermelon Sugar" was later released as the album's fourth single on 18 May 2020. The song was generally well received by music critics. The single also performed well commercially, peaking within the top ten in more than 20 countries, including the United Kingdom, Australia, Canada, and the United States, where it became Styles's first number-one single on the Billboard Hot 100 chart. It won the 2021 Grammy Award for Best Pop Solo Performance, and also won Song of the Year at the 41st Brit Awards the same year.

The music video for "Watermelon Sugar" was released on 18 May 2020, which received many positive reviews. Directed by Bradley & Pablo and filmed in Malibu, California, it features Styles alongside a plethora of people dancing on the beach and eating watermelon. Styles has promoted the single with many live televised performances including on Saturday Night Live, Later... with Jools Holland and Today.

== Background and release ==
"Watermelon Sugar" was written by Styles, Mitch Rowland, and producers Tyler Johnson and Kid Harpoon. It was originally written in September 2017 while Styles was on a day off from Harry Styles: Live on Tour. They went into The Cave Studio in Nashville, Tennessee and started the session by just playing around. They eventually started throwing around some ideas and came up with the repetitive chorus melody. They had the book, In Watermelon Sugar by Richard Brautigan and thought it would sound cool as the hook. The song is rumored to be about Styles's ex-girlfriend Camille Rowe, who happens to be a fan of In Watermelon Sugar.

The song was first teased by Styles in a 22 October 2019 tweet writing "Kiwi walked so Watermelon Sugar could run." Shortly after, it was revealed by iTunes to be the second track on Fine Line. "Watermelon Sugar" premiered at 23:30 ET on 16 November 2019 (4:30 UTC on 17 November) as the first promotional single from Fine Line, without any prior notice. It was accompanied by an audio video, showing the cover art for Fine Line, except with a watermelon in the hand. The song later impacted adult contemporary radio in United States on 18 May 2020, as the album's fourth official single and was also sent to radio in Italy and Canada. Styles promoted it with a meme generator on his website that has various lyrics from the song over a watermelon-inspired background.

== Music and lyrics ==
"Watermelon Sugar"
A 20-second sample of the pre-chorus and chorus, featuring Harry Styles's raspy vocals, over a repetitive melody with trumpets, guitars, and horns.

"Watermelon Sugar" is a pop rock, funk-pop song with 1970s and soul elements. It is composed in 4/4 time and the key of A minor (in the D Dorian mode), with a tempo of 96 beats per minute and a chord progression of Dm^{7}–Am^{7}–C–G. The track has a structure of verse, pre-chorus, chorus, verse, pre-chorus, chorus, post-chorus, bridge, chorus, post-chorus and runs for two minutes and fifty-three seconds. Driven by guitars and horns, the song also contains brass lines, summer-inflected sonics and a simple melody, reminiscent of jazz. It opens with a strummed guitar intro where electric guitar and drum beats soon join in. Trumpets are added in the second chorus, that builds up to the bridge, featuring ecstatic horns and high notes. The song closes with a brass-led outro.

Styles's vocals, which were described as "raspy", span from D_{3} to A_{4}. The song uses the metaphor of fruit and summer to describe a sexual encounter. According to Styles, the song is about the initial euphoria and excitement when one first starts seeing someone. Styles has also stated that it is about the female orgasm. He uses long notes to get this message across and the last chorus showcases Styles's higher vocal register. The song's lyrics use rhetoric and imagery. Savannah Walsh of Elle wrote about the song's meaning, asking the question "[is he] hankering for a refreshing summer treat or [is he] talking about cunnilingus," while USA Today's Patrick Ryan interpreted it as "Styles evocatively [recalling] a past fling and its sweet aftertaste."

== Critical reception ==
"Watermelon Sugar" was generally well received by music critics. Its guitar hook was praised by Charu Sinha of Vulture. In a positive review from USA Today, Patrick Ryan called it a "intoxicating standout" on Fine Line, writing that it "[encapsulates] the sultry, funky spirit of the project." NME's Hannah Mylrea called the song "bombastic" while the staff at DIY called it "exciting" and "sizzling." In her review for Rolling Stone, Brittany Spanos wrote "the track has the singer nostalgic for 'that summer feeling,' yearning for berries and the taste of watermelon sugar".

In his review for Variety, Chris Willman compared the song to Maroon 5 while Tim Sendra of AllMusic compared it to "Awaken, My Love!" by Childish Gambino. Writing for Now, Rea McNamara compared it to Jeanette Winterson calling it "sexual, grown-ass and tender" as well as comparing the vocal melody to "Sing It Back" by Moloko. Paste's Ellen Johnson called it Fine Line's most "traditional" song as well as comparing its bassline to Prince. Susan Hansen of Clash wrote that it has a "satisfying vibe" with its sonics. In a negative review from Consequence of Sound, Bryan Rolli called the song "plodding", while also writing it "commits the cardinal sin of being far less interesting than its title." Owen Richards of The Arts Desk also gave a negative review, calling its imagery "nonsensical," writing that it "misses the mark."

Select year-end rankings for "Watermelon Sugar"
Publication	List	Rank	Ref.
BBC	The best albums and songs of 2020	—N/a	
Billboard	The 100 Best Songs of 2019: Staff List	44	
Billboard	The 25 Best Music Videos of 2020: Staff Picks	1	
Gigwise	The Gigwise 20 Best Tracks of 2020	18	
Rolling Stone	Rob Sheffield's Top 25 Songs of 2020	1	
Slate	Top 20 Singles	11	
USA Today	Best music videos of 2020	—N/a	

== Commercial performance ==
In November 2019, "Watermelon Sugar" debuted at number thirty-five on the UK Singles Chart, giving Styles his third UK top 40 single at the time. In January 2020, it reached number seventeen on the chart before departing it the following month. After its official single release in May 2020, "Watermelon Sugar" re-entered the chart at number thirty-five; later ascending to a new peak of four in August 2020, becoming the second highest-charting single from the album. As of October 2020, it has 936,260 sales and has been certified platinum by the British Phonographic Industry (BPI). In Ireland, "Watermelon Sugar" debuted at number twenty-four on the Irish Singles Chart in November 2019, before reaching number four on the chart in June 2020. In Scotland, the single re-entered the chart at number seventy-eight in May 2020 and later peaked at number two the following month. In Greece, it debuted at 36 on 15 February 2020, however on 29 June, it peaked at number 6.

After the release of Fine Line, "Watermelon Sugar" debuted at number thirty-eight on the ARIA singles chart in Australia; later reaching a new peak of twelve in its fifth week. After being released as an official single in May 2020, the track re-entered the chart; reaching a new peak of number six in June 2020, Harry's highest-charting single from the album. In New Zealand, the song debuted at number thirty-three and has so far peaked at number four. It has been certified platinum in both countries.

In the United States, "Watermelon Sugar" debuted at number sixty on the Billboard Hot 100 chart dated 30 November 2019. It peaked at number fifty-four after the release of Fine Line and officially left the chart the following month. After being released as a single, "Watermelon Sugar" re-entered the chart in May at number sixty-four and reached number one on the chart dated 15 August 2020; giving Styles his first number-one single, his third top-ten single, as well as his fourth top-twenty single in the US, and third from Fine Line. He also became the second member of One Direction to reach number one on the Billboard Hot 100 after Zayn Malik with his 2016 hit "Pillowtalk". In doing so, Styles became first British artist to top on the Hot 100 with a single that did not top the UK Singles Chart after Adele's single "Set Fire to the Rain" in 2012 and the first British male to match the record since Jay Sean with his single "Down" in 2009. The single also topped the Mainstream Top 40 chart on the issue dated 8 August 2020, becoming the singer's second single after "Adore You" to top the chart, remaining at the summit for seven consecutive weeks. On 7 August 2020, it was certified double platinum by the Recording Industry Association of America. On the Canadian Hot 100, "Watermelon Sugar" debuted at number forty-six and later reached number three on the chart, becoming his second top-ten hit from the album in Canada.

== Music video ==
=== Background and production ===
The song's accompanying music video premiered on YouTube at 12:00 ET (16:00 UTC) on 18 May 2020. Styles announced the video's premiere a day prior with a teaser video showing a table on a beach, which was in a scene in the music video. It was directed by Bradley & Pablo and filmed in Malibu, California on 30 January 2020. They had tried to work with Styles for other songs on Fine Line and they eventually began working on "Watermelon Sugar" a week before they began filming. The video was inspired by Paul McCartney's 1960s style and was partly filmed using a 35 and 16 mm Arri SR3 camera to make some shots look vintage.

Due to the COVID-19 pandemic, it was revealed that the video had been delayed from its original release. Bradley & Pablo were worried that Columbia Records wouldn't release the video due to it looking insensitive, so they added a message at the beginning writing "this video is dedicated to touching." Styles was praised by the models in the video for asking for consent to touch them while filming.

The audio video, published during Fine Line's release, featured the cover art but the hidden hand with a glove could be seen this time carrying a watermelon.

=== Synopsis ===
Styles posing with models to take a picture. This was compared to the ending of Styles's "Kiwi" video.

The video opens with a message on a black background writing "this video is dedicated to touching." Styles is then seen walking up to a table with a watermelon slice on a plate, where he sits down. He wears an orange crochet tank, oversized blue sunglasses, bubblegum pink nail polish and his signature "HS" rings. The table cloth on the table is the same material as a boat sail in the "Adore You" video and the sunglasses are the same ones he wore in his 2019 Rolling Stone cover. He puts the plate on the table and begins singing the opening lyrics of the song. Styles is seen running his fingers on the watermelon before taking a bite. This shot was inspired by a picture of Jack Nicholson doing the same pose.

The video then cuts to Styles being surrounded by models who feed him various fruits as well as them enjoying a picnic. The models are seen wearing 1970s floppy hats and high-waisted bikinis. Styles is seen wearing a low-cut floral Hawaiian shirt with pearls and in other shots a sweater vest with a retro collared shirt. The former outfit was inspired by a picture of Paul McCartney at a party. He is also seen lying in the sand, watching the models. Later on, they take a picture, as a group, with all of them holding a watermelon slice each. Styles wears a cropped striped sweater, a skinny fringe scarf and a pair of vintage-inspired ripped jeans, all of which come from Gucci's fall 2020 collection.

=== Reception ===
Michele Amabile Angermiller of Variety compared the video to Elton John's "I'm Still Standing" while Harper's Bazaar's Chelsey Sanchez compared it to Mamma Mia!. In her review for Evening Standard, Sara Feigin noticed a similarity to Styles's previous video "Lights Up" with the models surrounding him, while The Independent's Ellie Harrison thought the beach was the same beach used by Styles's former band One Direction's video "What Makes You Beautiful". Brittany Spanos of Rolling Stone and Savannah Walsh of Elle both called the video "colorful" and "beachy". Writing for Us Weekly, Nicholas Hautman called it "ultrasexy" and "retro-filtered." In her review for Entertainment Weekly, Rosy Cordero wrote "Harry Styles is wishing he was back on the beach surrounded by beautiful people, deliciously colorful fruits, and no coronavirus."

Carolyn Droke of Uproxx called the video "a celebration of summer" while Morgan Smith of People called it "dreamy." Writing for NME, Will Lavin described the video as "Styles [throwing] a beach party with a group of women, who can all be seen eating watermelon throughout." Flare's Katherine Singh wrote "we'll never be able to look at a watermelon the same again" and "[the video] is pretty much poised to be the video of summer 2020." Alisha Pawa of Lifestyle Asia called the video "light-hearted" and wrote that it "evokes the nostalgia of better summer days." The music video has received over 220 million views on YouTube. In 2021, Rolling Stone named Watermelon Sugar the 98th best music video of all time.

== Live performances ==
Styles first performed "Watermelon Sugar" on Saturday Night Live, shortly after its release and on 21 November 2019, he performed it on Later... with Jools Holland. Both performances were performed alongside "Lights Up". He performed it at Capital FM's Jingle Bell Ball on 7 December 2019. On 13 December 2019, Styles performed the song as part of his one night only concert at The Forum in Los Angeles to celebrate the release of Fine Line. He also performed the song at a secret show at the Electric Ballroom in London on 19 December 2019. On 14 February 2020, he gave a live radio performance on BBC Radio 2's The Zoe Ball Breakfast Show and on 25 February 2020, he performed it as part of his NPR Tiny Desk Concert. It was performed by Styles on Today at Rockefeller Center on 26 February 2020. Styles performed the song on 28 February 2020 at the Music Hall of Williamsburg in Brooklyn as part of a secret session with SiriusXM and Pandora. The following day, he performed it in another secret session, this time with iHeartRadio at the Bowery Ballroom in New York City. Styles opened the 63rd Annual Grammy Awards with a jazzy rendition of "Watermelon Sugar" on 14 March 2021.

== Accolades ==
Awards and nominations for "Watermelon Sugar"
Organization	Year	Category	Result	Ref.
MTV Millennial Awards Brazil	2020	Global Hit	Nominated	
MTV Video Music Awards	2020	Song of Summer	Nominated	
NRJ Music Awards	2020	Video of the Year	Nominated	
Premios MUSA	2020	Anglo International Song of the Year	Won	
GAFFA Awards (Denmark)	2021	International Hit of The Year	Won	
'SEC' Awards	2021	International Song of The Year	Won	
RTHK International Pop Poll Awards	2021	Top Ten International Gold Songs	Won	
ASCAP Pop Music Awards	2021	Most Performed Pop Songs of 2020	Won	
MTV Video Play Awards	2021	Top 20 Music Videos	Won	
Grammy Awards	2021	Best Pop Solo Performance	Won	
Brit Awards	2021	British Single of the Year	Won	
iHeartRadio Music Awards	2021	Song of the Year	Nominated	
iHeartRadio Music Awards	2021	Best Music Video	Nominated	
Myx Music Awards	2021	Favorite International Video	Nominated	

== Track listing ==
- Cassette and 7-inch vinyl
1. "Watermelon Sugar" – 2:53
2. "Watermelon Sugar" (Instrumental Version) – 2:53

== Credits and personnel ==
Credits adapted from the liner notes of Fine Line.

=== Recording ===
- Recorded at Real World Studios (Bath, Somerset), RAK Studios (London), The Cave Studio (Nashville, Tennessee), Henson Recording Studios (Hollywood, California), and Harpoon House (Los Angeles, California)
- Mixed at EastWest Studios (Los Angeles, California)
- Mastered at Sterling Sound (Edgewater, New Jersey)

=== Personnel ===
- Harry Styles – songwriting, vocals, backing vocals
- Tyler Johnson – songwriting, production, backing vocals, keyboards
- Kid Harpoon – songwriting, production, backing vocals, acoustic guitar, electric guitar, piano
- Mitch Rowland – songwriting, drums, electric guitar, slide guitar
- Sarah Jones – backing vocals
- Pino Palladino – bass guitar
- Ivan Jackson – horn
- Dave Chegwidden – percussion
- Mark Rankin – engineering
- Nick Lobel – engineering
- Sammy Witte – engineering
- Dan Ewins – assistant engineering
- Matt Tuggle – assistant engineering
- Michael Freeman – assistant engineering
- Oli Jacobs – assistant engineering
- Oliver Middleton – assistant engineering
- Spike Stent – mixing
- Michael Freeman – mix assistant
- Randy Merrill – mastering

== Charts ==
=== Weekly charts ===
Weekly chart performance
Chart (2019–2021)	Peak position
Argentina Hot 100 (Billboard)	26
Australia (ARIA)	5
Austria (Ö3 Austria Top 40)	5
Belgium (Ultratop 50 Flanders)	2
Belgium (Ultratop 50 Wallonia)	2
Bolivia Airplay (Monitor Latino)	13
Brazil Airplay (Crowley Charts)	30
Brazil International Pop Airplay (Crowley Charts)	1
Canada Hot 100 (Billboard)	3
Canada AC (Billboard)	1
Canada CHR/Top 40 (Billboard)	2
Canada Hot AC (Billboard)	1
CIS Airplay (TopHit)	93
Colombia Airplay (National-Report)	32
Croatia International Airplay (Top lista)	3
Czech Republic Airplay (ČNS IFPI)	9
Czech Republic Singles Digital (ČNS IFPI)	4
Denmark (Tracklisten)	10
Dominican Republic (SODINPRO)	31
El Salvador Anglo Airplay (Monitor Latino)	6
Estonia (Eesti Tipp-40)	8
Euro Digital Song Sales (Billboard)	5
France (SNEP)	31
Germany (GfK)	15
Global 200 (Billboard)	9
Greece International (IFPI)	6
Hungary (Rádiós Top 40)	10
Hungary (Single Top 40)	3
Hungary (Stream Top 40)	6
Iceland (Tónlistinn)	3
India International (IMI)	13
Ireland (IRMA)	2
Israel International Airplay (Media Forest)	1
Italy (FIMI)	21
Latvia Streaming (LAIPA)	16
Lebanon (Lebanese Top 20)	7
Lithuania (AGATA)	1
Malaysia (RIM)	9
Mexico Airplay (Billboard)	2
Netherlands (Dutch Top 40)	2
Netherlands (Single Top 100)	4
New Zealand (Recorded Music NZ)	4
Norway (VG-lista)	5
Poland Airplay (ZPAV)	11
Portugal (AFP)	1
Portugal Airplay (AFP)	1
Romania (Airplay 100)	40
San Marino Airplay (SMRTV Top 50)	18
Scottish Singles Sales (Official Charts)	5
Singapore (RIAS)	12
Slovakia Airplay (ČNS IFPI)	6
Slovakia Singles Digital (ČNS IFPI)	7
Slovenia Airplay (SloTop50)	1
South Africa Streaming (RISA)	23
South Korea (Gaon)	101
Spain (Promusicae)	41
Suriname (Nationale Top 40)	5
Sweden (Sverigetopplistan)	9
Switzerland (Schweizer Hitparade)	3
UK Singles (Official Charts)	4
US Billboard Hot 100	1
US Adult Contemporary (Billboard)	7
US Adult Pop Airplay (Billboard)	1
US Dance Airplay (Billboard)	4
US Pop Airplay (Billboard)	1
US Rolling Stone Top 100	7

2023–2026 eekly chart performance
Chart (2023–2026)	Peak position
Lithuania Airplay (TopHit)	91
Netherlands Airplay (Dutch Charts)	50
Poland (Polish Streaming Top 100)	94

=== Monthly charts ===
Chart (2020)	Position
Brazil (Pro-Música Brasil)	27
Paraguay (SGP)	86

=== Year-end charts ===
Year-end chart performance
Chart (2020)	Position
Australia (ARIA)	6
Austria (Ö3 Austria Top 40)	14
Belgium (Ultratop Flanders)	10
Belgium (Ultratop Wallonia)	18
Brazil Airplay (Crowley)	100
Canada (Canadian Hot 100)	16
Croatia (HRT)	36
Denmark (Tracklisten)	24
France (SNEP)	76
Germany (Official German Charts)	43
Hungary (Rádiós Top 40)	70
Hungary (Single Top 40)	35
Hungary (Stream Top 40)	12
Iceland (Tónlistinn)	11
Ireland (IRMA)	9
Italy (FIMI)	44
Netherlands (Dutch Top 40)	6
Netherlands (Single Top 100)	16
New Zealand (Recorded Music NZ)	10
Norway (VG-lista)	20
Poland (Polish Airplay Top 100)	93
Portugal (AFP)	13
Sweden (Sverigetopplistan)	18
Switzerland (Schweizer Hitparade)	17
UK Singles (OCC)	10
US Billboard Hot 100	20
US Adult Contemporary (Billboard)	33
US Adult Top 40 (Billboard)	11
US Dance/Mix Show Airplay (Billboard)	11
US Mainstream Top 40 (Billboard)	8

Year-end chart performance
Chart (2021)	Position
Australia (ARIA)	31
Austria (Ö3 Austria Top 40)	67
Belgium (Ultratop Flanders)	61
Brazil Airplay (Crowley)	71
Brazil Streaming (Pro-Música Brasil)	74
Canada (Canadian Hot 100)	79
Denmark (Tracklisten)	69
France (SNEP)	87
Global 200 (Billboard)	23
Hungary (Rádiós Top 40)	33
New Zealand (Recorded Music NZ)	40
Portugal (AFP)	28
Switzerland (Schweizer Hitparade)	48
UK Singles (OCC)	43
US Adult Contemporary (Billboard)	13

Year-end chart performance
Chart (2022)	Position
Australia (ARIA)	44
Brazil (Pro-Música Brasil)	158
Denmark (Tracklisten)	98
Global 200 (Billboard)	46
Lithuania (AGATA)	69
UK Singles (OCC)	71

Year-end chart performance
Chart (2023)	Position
Australia (ARIA)	76
Global 200 (Billboard)	113

Year-end chart performance
Chart (2025)	Position
Argentina Anglo Airplay (Monitor Latino)	86
Chile Airplay (Monitor Latino)	66

== Certifications ==
Certifications and sales
Region	Certification	Certified units/sales
Argentina	Platinum	
Australia (ARIA)	12× Platinum	840,000^{‡}
Austria (IFPI Austria)	3× Platinum	90,000^{‡}
Belgium (BRMA)	Platinum	40,000^{‡}
Brazil (Pro-Música Brasil)	3× Diamond	480,000^{‡}
Canada (Music Canada)	Diamond	800,000^{‡}
Denmark (IFPI Danmark)	3× Platinum	270,000^{‡}
France (SNEP)	Diamond	333,333^{‡}
Germany (BVMI)	Platinum	400,000^{‡}
Italy (FIMI)	3× Platinum	300,000^{‡}
Mexico (AMPROFON)	3× Diamond+Gold	930,000^{‡}
New Zealand (RMNZ)	8× Platinum	240,000^{‡}
Norway (IFPI Norway)	2× Platinum	120,000^{‡}
Poland (ZPAV)	4× Platinum	80,000^{‡}
Portugal (AFP)	8× Platinum	80,000^{‡}
Spain (Promusicae)	4× Platinum	240,000^{‡}
Switzerland (IFPI Switzerland)	2× Platinum	40,000^{‡}
United Kingdom (BPI)	5× Platinum	3,000,000^{‡}
United States (RIAA)	7× Platinum	7,000,000^{‡}
Streaming
Greece (IFPI Greece)	2× Platinum	4,000,000^{†}
^{‡} Sales+streaming figures based on certification alone.^{†} Streaming-only figures based on certification alone.

== Release history ==
Release dates and formats
Region	Date	Format(s)	Label	Ref.
Various	16 November 2019 (Note: Release as a promotional single.)	Digital download; streaming	Erskine; Columbia	
United States	18 May 2020	Adult contemporary radio	Columbia	
United States	19 May 2020	Contemporary hit radio	Columbia	
Canada	20 May 2020	Adult contemporary radio; Contemporary hit radio	Sony Music Canada	
Italy	22 May 2020	Radio airplay	Sony Music Italy	
Various	30 July 2020	7-inch vinyl; cassette	Erskine; Columbia	

== See also ==
- List of Billboard Hot 100 number ones of 2020
- List of highest-certified singles in Australia
