= Adore You (Harry Styles song) =

2019 single by Harry Styles

Single by Harry Styles

from the album Fine Line
- Released: 6 December 2019
- Recorded: 2019
- Studio: Henson (Hollywood); RAK (London); Harpoon House (Los Angeles)
- Genre: Funk; disco; pop rock
- Length: 3:27
- Label: Erskine; Columbia
- Songwriters: Harry Styles; Amy Allen; Tyler Johnson; Tom Hull
- Producer: Kid Harpoon

Harry Styles singles chronology
"Lights Up" (2019)	"Adore You" (2019)	"Falling" (2020)

Music video
- "Adore You" on YouTube

"Adore You" is a song by English singer-songwriter Harry Styles from his second studio album, Fine Line (2019). It was released through Erskine and Columbia Records as the album's second single on 6 December 2019. The song was written by Styles, Amy Allen, Kid Harpoon and Tyler Johnson, with Harpoon handling the production and Johnson serving as a co-producer. "Adore You" has been described as a midtempo funk, disco, and pop rock ballad, incorporating layered guitars, synths, brass and percussions in its production. A love song, its lyrics find Styles talking about the initial stages of a relationship.

Upon its release, "Adore You" received generally favourable reviews from music critics, who praised its production and Styles' vocals. It was also compared to the works of the 1975, Mark Ronson and Justin Timberlake. "Adore You" was a commercial success. The song peaked at number six on the US Billboard Hot 100 and at number seven on the UK Singles Chart, in addition to reaching the top ten in Australia, Canada, Ireland, New Zealand, Scotland, and Wallonia region of Belgium. It has been certified in multiple territories, most notably a platinum award from the British Phonographic Industry (BPI), a triple platinum and double platinum certification from the Australian Recording Industry Association (ARIA) and the Recording Industry Association of America (RIAA), respectively.

The music video for "Adore You" was directed by Dave Meyers and premiered simultaneously with the song's release on YouTube. Filmed in Scotland, the high-concept visuals depict Styles as an outcast in the fictional island of Eroda, where he befriends a gold-dappled fish and takes care of it. The video was teased with a guerrilla marketing campaign which took the form of a tourism website and Twitter account for Eroda. To promote the song, Styles performed it on several occasions, including The Graham Norton Show and The Late Late Show with James Corden.

== Background and composition ==
"Adore You"
A 21-second sample of "Adore You", a pop, funk, disco, psychedelic pop, and pop rock song, featuring a groovy beat and Styles' falsetto vocals in the chorus.

"Adore You" was written by Styles, Amy Allen, its producer, Kid Harpoon and its co-producer, Tyler Johnson. It was mastered by Randy Merrill and mixed by Spike Stent. According to Rolling Stone, the song was written "in a burst of inspiration", in the sessions in the final week of Spring 2019. "Adore You" was described as a funk, disco, and pop rock song in press reviews, featuring elements of 1970s, soul and R&B. Lasting for three minutes and twenty-seven seconds, the song was composed using 4/4 common time in the key of C minor, with a moderate tempo of 100 beats per minute and chord progression of Cm–E♭–A♭–B♭. Its production makes use of layered and choppy guitars, floaty and watery synths, bass and drums. The song is further driven by "big-club" beat-drop and brass instrumentation.

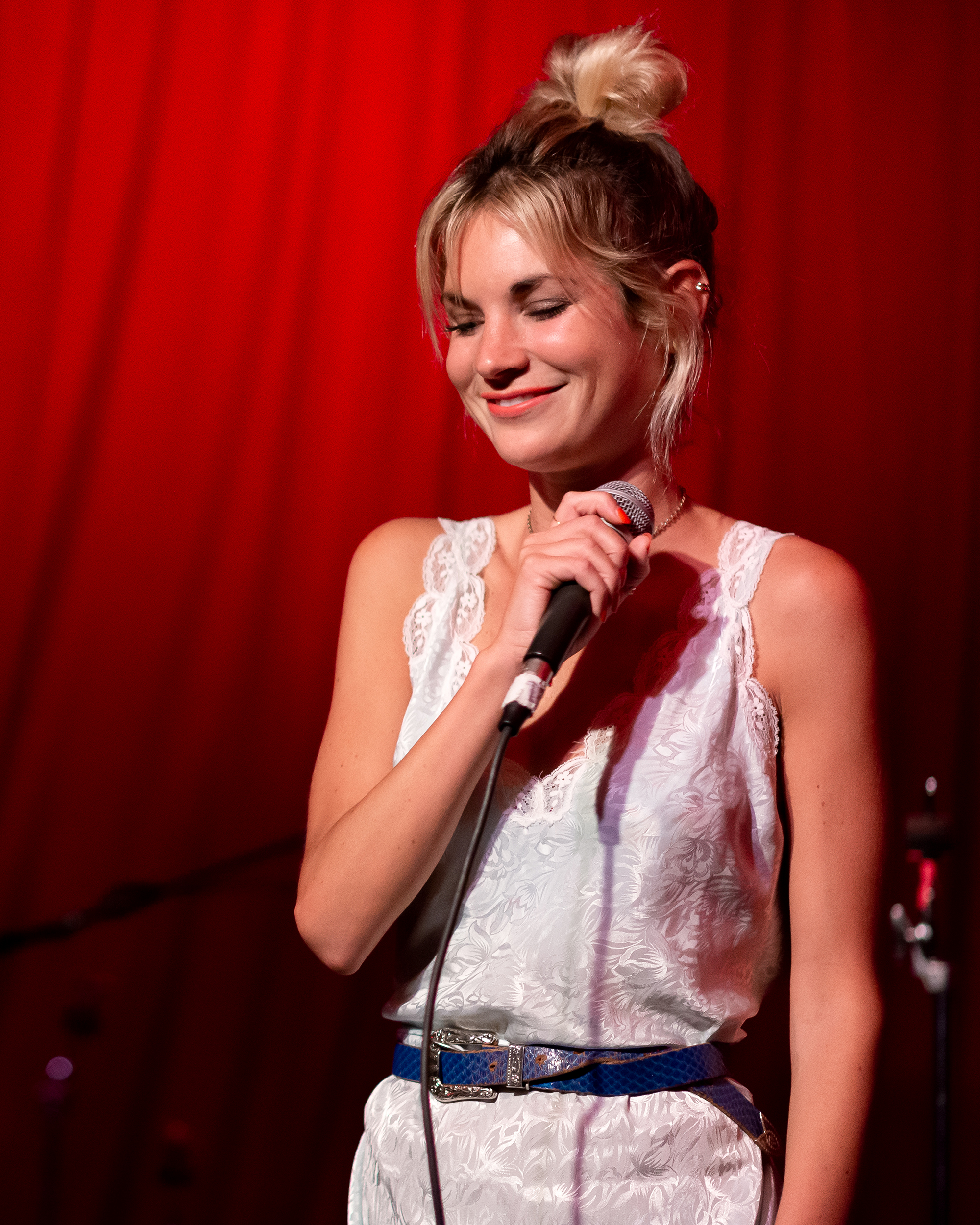
Amy Allen (pictured) co-wrote the song and also contributed to backing vocals.

Built around a sombre tone, the song uses "bubbly" percussions and ends with an electric guitar solo. Rea McNamara of Now noted that the track incorporated a smooth '80s bassline. Meanwhile, Gregory Robinson from The Guardian described the bassline as modern and electronic. Ellen Johnson of Paste magazine noted that the song utilizes Far East sound. For Chris Willman of Variety, the track builds with "a throbbing beat and a funk rhythm guitar."

Lyrically, "Adore You" is about wanting to love someone. At NPR Music's Tiny Desk Concert, Styles revealed that the song is "kind of similar to what 'Watermelon Sugar' is about – that initial excitement of meeting someone." In an interview, Amy Allen explained, "It's totally a love song" that "is reminiscent of the '70s." The opening verse of "Adore You" finds Styles using technicolor lyrics and fruit metaphors such as: "Walk in your rainbow paradise (Paradise) / Strawberry lipstick state of mind (State of mind)," before he declares his yearning for the subject of the song in the pre-chorus, "You don't have to say you love me / You don't have to say nothing / You don't have to say you're mine." The chorus opens with a groovy beat followed by Styles' falsetto vocals as he sings: "Honey / I'd walk through fire for you / Just let me adore you."

== Release and promotion ==
On 20 November 2019, a Twitter account with the username "@visiteroda", which was launched in October, tweeted the post "The Isle of Eroda's rich history is embedded in daily life as the ruins of many structures from the past remain standing across the land. #VisitEroda." Shortly after, a website was set up for the place and advertisements were posted on Facebook and Google in which the island of Eroda was promoted and questions from fellow Twitter users were answered. The island was soon proven to not exist and was a part of the marketing campaign for Styles' forthcoming single. On 2 December, Styles officially announced the title and release date of the single on his social media, with Eroda being the main focus of its music video. Done up in the style of a tarot card, the single's cover art was also released on the same day and shows Styles praying in the ocean, encircled by five fish. It was inspired by the song's accompanying visual. "Adore You" was made available for digital download and streaming by Erskine and Columbia Records as the second single from Styles' second studio album, Fine Line, on 6 December 2019.

Styles gave his first live performance of "Adore You" on 7 December 2019 on The Graham Norton Show. On 9 December, he performed the song at Capital FM's 2019 Jingle Bell Ball in London. On 10 December, he performed it again on The Late Late Show with James Corden. The performance set was bolstered by a "cutout" boat and "crashing waves," while Styles was backed by a band. Nina Corcoran of Consequence of Sound, praised Styles' performance, writing, "Maybe it's because of his suit or the way he moved during the song's instrumental interlude, but he gives off some major Bowie vibes during the performance." On 18 December, Styles performed the song on BBC Radio 1's Live Lounge. The song was included in the setlist of his one-night concert at The Forum, Los Angeles on 13 December, to commemorate the release of his second album. On 27 February 2020, Styles performed the song on NBC's The Today Show at Rockefeller Center. "Adore You" was again included as a part of the five-song set which Styles performed at the Music Hall of Williamsburg for SiriusXM and Pandora Radio's secret session on 28 February. On 16 March 2020, Styles performed the song on NPR Music's Tiny Desk Concert, alongside "Cherry", "Watermelon Sugar", and "To Be So Lonely".

This song is featured on Just Dance 2021 and as a DLC in Fuser, as one of the first DLCs released on 19 November 2020, alongside "Groove Is in the Heart" by Deee-Lite and "Inside Out" by Zedd and Griff.

== Critical reception ==
"Adore You" received generally favourable reviews from music critics. In her review for The New York Times, Lindsay Zoladz regarded the song as an album highlight and wrote, "It's the one in which past and present coalesce most seamlessly, its playful psychedelia streamlined into sleek modern hit-making," while also praising Styles' vocal range and high notes in the track's chorus. Popjustice's music critic Peter Robinson compared "Adore You" sonically to The 1975's "Somebody Else" (2015). On the other hand, Emma Swann, of DIY magazine likened the song's musical style to the works of British–American musician Mark Ronson. Lauren Murphy of Entertainment.ie characterized the song's "soulful little interjections" as Justin Timberlake-esque. Reviewing for Clash, Susan Hansen favoured the "mesmeric" pop and soul elements of the song which suited praised Styles' "soft, fully projected" vocals. Viewing the sound as "lush", she felt that the basslines "flow seamlessly and carry the track through to completion." Gregory Robinson of The Guardian said that the track displayed significant evolution in Styles' sound and viewed the hook as his "catchiest [hook] to date."

In her review for Time, Raisa Bruner listed "Adore You" as one of the five best songs of the week and deemed it as "timeless and friendly". MTV's Madeline Roth likened the song to Styles' previous single, "Watermelon Sugar" and wrote that the "funky, synthy new tune is a tale of lust and devotion." Alex Rodobolski of Exclaim! called the song "a fun pop banger" with an "endearing tune" that circumscribes the album with "a certain sense of mysticism." Writing for Rolling Stone, Brenna Ehrlich labelled the song as a "simple ballad about love and devotion." Louise Bruton of The Irish Times regarded the song as "truly blissful". In her review of Fine Line for The A.V. Club, Annie Zaleski called the song "velvety soul" and "luxurious" like Styles' previous single "Lights Up". Rhian Daly of NME gave a mixed review and wrote that the song "does little to differentiate itself from being any other slice of generic chart fodder."

== Commercial performance ==
"Adore You" entered the UK Singles Chart at number 11 for the issue date of 13 December 2019. In its fourth week, the song peaked at number seven becoming Styles' third top ten solo entry on the chart. In July 2024, the single was awarded a triple platinum certification by the British Phonographic Industry (BPI) for track-equivalent sales of 1,800,000 units. In specific parts of the UK, it reached number four in Scotland. It was Styles' third Irish top-ten hit and tied with "Lights Up" for his highest-charting track in the country. In other parts of Europe, "Adore You" garnered top-ten peaks in Croatia, Iceland, Hungary, Lithuania, Slovenia, the Wallonia region of Belgium, and was in the top 20 in charts of the Czech Republic, Estonia, Belgium's Flanders region, the Netherlands, Latvia, Poland, and Portugal.

In Australia, "Adore You" entered the ARIA Singles Charts at number 14 in the week of 22 December 2019. The following week, the song climbed to number seven, making it Styles' third top ten, tying with "Lights Up" as his second highest-charting single there. In its third week, the song dropped to number 14 but rebounded back to number 10 in the week of 12 January 2020. The single further topped The Music Network Australian Airplay Chart, marking Styles' first number one on Australian radio. In April 2020, the song was certified double platinum by the Australian Recording Industry Association (ARIA) for track-equivalent sales of 140,000 units. In New Zealand, the song peaked at number six on the issue dated 23 December 2019, and has since been certified platinum by the Recorded Music NZ.

"Adore You" debuted at number 35 on the US Billboard Hot 100 for the issue date of 21 December 2019. In its 15th week, it broke into the top ten at number seven where it remained for a further week. This gave Styles his second single top ten single after 2017's "Sign of the Times". The song eventually peaked at number six in its 17th week, becoming the second highest performing single from Fine Line. It also became Styles' longest charting top ten single in the US. The song reached number one on the Billboard Pop Songs radio chart, becoming Styles' first chart-topper. The song went on to stay on the chart for 45 weeks, tying the record for most weeks on the chart with "Circles" by Post Malone, "Eastside" by Benny Blanco, Halsey, and Khalid, "Love Lies" by Khalid and Normani, and "New Rules" by Dua Lipa.

The song also topped the list of most added songs of the week by adult contemporary radio, reaching the top of Mediabase Hot AC chart with 6642 spins, on the week of 26 April-2 May 2020. In addition, it peaked at number two on the Adult Pop Songs chart and topped the Adult Contemporary chart, becoming Styles' first number-one hit on the latter chart. In December 2020, the song was certified triple platinum by the Recording Industry Association of America (RIAA), for track-equivalent sales of three million units. In Canada, the single peaked at number ten on the Canadian Hot 100, Styles' second single to reach the top ten of the chart.

== Music video ==
=== Background ===
The music video for "Adore You" was filmed in three Scottish locations: St Abbs, Cockenzie and Port Seton. It was directed by Dave Meyers, while the script was written by him and Chris Shafer. Scott Cunningham was credited as the director of photography and Nathan Scherrer as the producer. The visual premiered on Styles' official YouTube channel on 6 December 2019 at 05:00 PT (12:00 UTC), and was preceded by a trailer released on 2 December on the same platform. The first two-minutes of the eight-minute long clip contains a narration by Spanish singer Rosalía. The high-concept video features several VFX shots to offer a realistic feel to it. The nautical outfits in the video were created by Harry Lambert.

=== Synopsis ===
Styles smiling with the townspeople, as the curse is broken in the folkloric isle of Eroda in the music video

The video opens in the fictional "frown-shaped" isle of Eroda (Adore spelt backwards), a small fishing village located somewhere in the middle of the sea, where the inhabitants have "resting fish [faces]" and no one smiles. The fishermen in the folkloric island are superstitious and wear single gold earrings for good luck. The clip then cuts to a scene where a baby having a bright smile on his face is born. The following scenes show the boy growing up to become Styles, who has a "peculiar" ability to blind everyone with his smile. Terrified, the townspeople ostracize him which leaves Styles feeling like an outcast, and he withdraws from society. The clip then shows him spending his days by screaming into empty jars, to give vent to his pent-up distress for being different. However, when the jars are not enough, he heads to the sea in an attempt to drown himself, and stumbles across a "gold-dappled" small fish flapping on the rocks. The fish is also unhappy and feels alone and appears to be trying to end his life as well. Styles decides to take the fish home with him and the two begin to bond.

Throughout the visual, Styles' anguish is eased off by the fish, as he cares for it and carries it as a companion, around the town. The video is interspersed with scenes where they are seen sharing miniature-sized tacos on a picnic or pints at the pub. Over the course of the clip, the fish rapidly grows larger in size and has to be placed from small kettles to transparent backpacks, and eventually in a big tank, supported on wagon wheels. Styles sees news about other similar fish migrating on television and decides to return the fish to the sea to be with them. As Harry is returning it to the water the fish, startled by the sight of a fish market, bursts out of its tank, causing the residents to come together and help Styles to return the fish back to the water. After working together, the townspeople finally smile along with Styles, and he decides to sail away from the isle to explore the world.

=== Reception ===
Brooke Marine from W described the video as "a classic fish out of water tale, but with Styles and a literal fish at the center of it." Writing for Elle, Savannah Walsh praised the visual for its "high-concept scenarios" and regarded it as "Wes Anderson-meets-The Shape of Water" tale which has a "Twilight Zone-like twist." Madeline Roth of MTV also shared a similar view that complimented the "high-concept visual treatment." Claire Lampen of The Cut deemed the video as "whimsical" and viewed it as "an extended metaphor for the end of a romantic relationship." She further praised the visual, writing, "It's all very delightful, but also, timely and important." Labelling the visual "cheeky, weird and magical," Brenna Ehrlich of Rolling Stone likened its story-line and concept to Harry Nilsson's animated film The Point!, and lauded Styles' ability for "elevating a good pop song to something closer to absurdist art." Rhian Daly of NME deemed the video as "next-level weird – but also strangely beautiful."

== Awards and nominations ==
Awards and nominations for "Adore You"
Organization	Year	Category	Result	Ref.
MTV Video Music Awards	2020	Best Direction	Nominated	
MTV Video Music Awards	2020	Best Art Direction	Nominated	
MTV Video Music Awards	2020	Best Visual Effects	Nominated	
Rockbjörnen	2020	Foreign Song of the Year	Nominated	
TEC Awards	2020	Record Production / Single or Track	Nominated	
MVPA Awards	2020	Best Pop Video	Won	
APRA Music Awards	2021	Most Performed International Work	Nominated	
The Ivors	2021	PRS for Music Most Performed Work	Won	
Grammy Awards	2021	Grammy Award for Best Music Video	Nominated	
BMI Pop Awards	2021	Most Performed Songs of the Year	Won	
ASCAP Pop Music Awards	2021	Award Winning Songs	Won	
Billboard Music Awards	2021	Top Radio Song	Nominated	
iHeartRadio Music Awards	2021	Best Lyrics	Won	

== Credits and personnel ==
Credits adapted from the liner notes of Fine Line.

=== Recording ===
- Recorded at RAK Studios (London, United Kingdom), Harpoon House (Los Angeles, California) and Henson Recording Studios (Hollywood, California)
- Mixed at EastWest Studios (Los Angeles, California)
- Mastered at Sterling Sound (Edgewater, New Jersey)

=== Personnel ===
- Harry Styles – vocals, backing vocals, songwriting
- Kid Harpoon – production, songwriting, drums, bass, electric guitar, drum programming, keyboards, engineering
- Tyler Johnson – co-production, songwriting, drum programming, keyboards
- Amy Allen – songwriting, backing vocals
- Jeremy Hatcher – engineering
- Matt Tuggle – assistant engineering
- Michael Freeman – mix assisting
- Spike Stent – mixing
- Randy Merrill – mastering

== Charts ==
=== Weekly charts ===
Weekly chart performance for "Adore You"
Chart (2019–2020)	Peak position
Argentina Hot 100 (Billboard)	56
Australia (ARIA)	7
Austria (Ö3 Austria Top 40)	56
Belgium (Ultratop 50 Flanders)	12
Belgium (Ultratop 50 Wallonia)	8
Bolivia (Monitor Latino)	7
Brazil (Top 100 Brasil)	66
Canada Hot 100 (Billboard)	10
Canada AC (Billboard)	1
Canada CHR/Top 40 (Billboard)	5
Canada Hot AC (Billboard)	2
CIS Airplay (TopHit)	146
Croatia International Airplay (Top lista)	8
Czech Republic Airplay (ČNS IFPI)	32
Czech Republic Singles Digital (ČNS IFPI)	17
Denmark (Tracklisten)	27
Estonia (Eesti Tipp-40)	15
Euro Digital Song Sales (Billboard)	7
Finland (Suomen virallinen lista)	19
France (SNEP)	126
Germany (GfK)	82
Global 200 (Billboard)	68
Greece International (IFPI)	15
Hungary (Rádiós Top 40)	9
Hungary (Single Top 40)	15
Hungary (Stream Top 40)	24
Iceland (Tónlistinn)	6
Ireland (IRMA)	4
Italy (FIMI)	78
Latvia (LAIPA)	12
Lithuania (AGATA)	5
Malaysia (RIM)	16
Mexico Airplay (Billboard)	24
Netherlands (Dutch Top 40)	11
Netherlands (Single Top 100)	24
New Zealand (Recorded Music NZ)	6
Norway (VG-lista)	34
Poland Airplay (ZPAV)	11
Portugal (AFP)	13
Romania (Airplay 100)	60
Scottish Singles Sales (Official Charts)	4
Singapore (RIAS)	14
Slovakia Airplay (ČNS IFPI)	40
Slovakia Singles Digital (ČNS IFPI)	23
Slovenia (SloTop50)	4
Spain (Promusicae)	83
Sweden (Sverigetopplistan)	40
Switzerland (Schweizer Hitparade)	35
UK Singles (Official Charts)	7
US Billboard Hot 100	6
US Adult Contemporary (Billboard)	1
US Adult Pop Airplay (Billboard)	2
US Dance Airplay (Billboard)	7
US Pop Airplay (Billboard)	1
US Rolling Stone Top 100	13

2024 Weekly chart performance for "Adore You"
Chart (2024)	Peak position
Moldova Airplay (TopHit)	81

=== Year-end charts ===
2020 year-end chart performance for "Adore You"
Chart (2020)	Position
Australia (ARIA)	11
Belgium (Ultratop Flanders)	35
Belgium (Ultratop Wallonia)	42
Canada (Canadian Hot 100)	12
Croatia (HRT)	20
Denmark (Tracklisten)	45
Hungary (Rádiós Top 40)	21
Hungary (Stream Top 40)	82
Iceland (Tónlistinn)	13
Ireland (IRMA)	19
Netherlands (Dutch Top 40)	37
Netherlands (Single Top 100)	74
New Zealand (Recorded Music NZ)	18
Panama Airplay (Monitor Latino)	96
Poland (Polish Airplay Top 100)	58
Portugal (AFP)	38
Sweden (Sverigetopplistan)	88
Switzerland (Schweizer Hitparade)	99
UK Singles (OCC)	16
US Billboard Hot 100	6
US Radio Songs (Billboard)	4
US Adult Contemporary (Billboard)	7
US Adult Top 40 (Billboard)	5
US Dance/Mix Show Airplay (Billboard)	13
US Mainstream Top 40 (Billboard)	2

2021 year-end chart performance for "Adore You"
Chart (2021)	Position
Global 200 (Billboard)	145
Portugal (AFP)	162
US Adult Contemporary (Billboard)	7

== Certifications ==
Certifications and sales for "Adore You"
Region	Certification	Certified units/sales
Argentina	Gold	
Australia (ARIA)	7× Platinum	490,000^{‡}
Austria (IFPI Austria)	Platinum	30,000^{‡}
Belgium (BRMA)	Platinum	40,000^{‡}
Brazil (Pro-Música Brasil)	3× Diamond	480,000^{‡}
Canada (Music Canada)	6× Platinum	480,000^{‡}
Denmark (IFPI Danmark)	Platinum	90,000^{‡}
France (SNEP)	Platinum	200,000^{‡}
Germany (BVMI)	Gold	200,000^{‡}
Italy (FIMI)	Platinum	100,000^{‡}
Mexico (AMPROFON)	2× Diamond+2× Platinum+Gold	750,000^{‡}
New Zealand (RMNZ)	6× Platinum	180,000^{‡}
Norway (IFPI Norway)	Platinum	60,000^{‡}
Poland (ZPAV)	3× Platinum	60,000^{‡}
Portugal (AFP)	2× Platinum	20,000^{‡}
Spain (Promusicae)	2× Platinum	120,000^{‡}
Switzerland (IFPI Switzerland)	Platinum	20,000^{‡}
United Kingdom (BPI)	3× Platinum	1,800,000^{‡}
United States (RIAA)	5× Platinum	5,000,000^{‡}
Streaming
Greece (IFPI Greece)	Gold	1,000,000^{†}
^{‡} Sales+streaming figures based on certification alone.^{†} Streaming-only figures based on certification alone.

== Release history ==
Release dates and formats for "Adore You"
Country	Date	Format	Label	Ref.
Various	6 December 2019	Digital download; streaming	Erskine; Columbia	
United Kingdom	6 December 2019	Contemporary hit radio	Erskine; Columbia	
United Kingdom	7 December 2019	Adult contemporary radio	Erskine; Columbia	
United States	9 December 2019	Adult contemporary radio	Columbia	
United States	10 December 2019	Contemporary hit radio	Columbia	
Italy	3 January 2020	Contemporary hit radio	Sony	

== See also ==
- List of Billboard Adult Contemporary number ones of 2020
