= Fine Line (Harry Styles album) =

2019 studio album by Harry Styles

Studio album by Harry Styles
- Released: 13 December 2019
- Recorded: January 2018 — September 2019
- Studios: Real World Studios (Box, Wiltshire); Sterling Sound Studios (Nashville, Tennessee); Shangri-La (Malibu, California)
- Genre: Pop rock
- Length: 46:37
- Labels: Erskine; Columbia
- Producers: Kid Harpoon; Tyler Johnson; Greg Kurstin; Jeff Bhasker

Harry Styles chronology
Harry Styles (2017)	Fine Line (2019)	Harry's House (2022)

Singles from Fine Line
- 1. "Lights Up" Released: 11 October 2019; 2. "Adore You" Released: 6 December 2019; 3. "Falling" Released: 7 March 2020; 4. "Watermelon Sugar" Released: 18 May 2020; 5. "Golden" Released: 23 October 2020; 6. "Treat People with Kindness" Released: 9 January 2021; 7. "Fine Line" Released: 19 November 2021

Fine Line is the second studio album by the English singer and songwriter Harry Styles, released on 13 December 2019 by Erskine and Columbia Records. The album's themes revolve around breakups, happiness, sex, and sadness. The record has been described as pop rock, with elements of progressive-pop, psychedelic pop, folk, soul, funk and indie pop. It was primarily written by and produced by frequent collaborator Tyler Johnson and Kid Harpoon.

Supported by seven singles—"Lights Up", "Adore You", "Falling", "Watermelon Sugar", "Golden", "Treat People with Kindness", and the title track—the album debuted at number three on the UK Albums Chart, peaked at number two, and has since been certified triple platinum. It debuted at number one on the Billboard 200, making it Styles' second consecutive number-one album in the US. The album had the third-largest sales week of 2019 in the US and broke the record as the biggest debut from a British male artist since Nielsen SoundScan began, earning 478,000 album-equivalent units. It has been certified triple platinum in the US for combined sales and album-equivalent units of over three million units in the country.

Fine Line received generally positive reviews from music critics, particularly towards its production and stylistic influences. It was nominated for Album of the Year at the 2020 Brit Awards, and for Best Pop Vocal Album at the 2021 Grammy Awards. The album received a Grammy Award for Best Pop Solo Performance and a Brit Award for British Single of the Year for "Watermelon Sugar". In 2020, Rolling Stone ranked it at the time, number 491, on its list of the 500 Greatest Albums of All Time.

== Background ==
In an interview with Rolling Stone released on 26 August 2019, it was reported that the singer was putting the "final touches" on his album which Styles explained was "all about having sex and feeling sad." The album was also described to contain his "toughest, most soulful songs he's written yet." On the direction of his second album, Styles revealed he wanted to be more fun and adventurous compared to his self-titled debut album.

Much of the album was inspired by Styles' relationship with model Camille Rowe. Following the couple's split, producer and writer Kid Harpoon encouraged Styles to deal with his emotions by writing about them. During the recording Styles was inspired by David Bowie, Van Morrison, Paul McCartney and Joni Mitchell. The latter's album Blue (1971) and its use of the dulcimer, particularly influenced the album's musical style. Styles tracked down the woman who built the dulcimer used in Mitchell's album, Joellen Lapidus, and had a musical exchange; she would go on to sell him the Crying Seahorse dulcimer which was used during the album's recording. Styles used "mushrooms" during the recording process.

== Composition ==
=== Music and production ===
Fine Line is primarily a pop rock record that incorporates elements of progressive pop, psychedelic pop, folk, soul, funk and indie pop.

=== Songs ===
"This time I really felt so much less afraid to write fun pop songs. It had to do with the whole thing of being on tour and feeling accepted. I listen to stuff like Harry Nilsson and Paul Simon and Van Morrison, and I think, well, Van Morrison has 'Brown Eyed Girl' and Nilsson has 'Coconut.' Bowie has 'Let's Dance.' The fun stuff is important."

— Styles on the musical inspiration behind "Adore You".

"Golden" is an indie pop song in the style of 1970s California music. Released as the fifth single of the album, it was recorded on the second day of production at the Shangri-La studio and written to be the first track. Styles wrote it in the kitchen of the studio and was inspired by Northern Irish singer Van Morrison's songwriting. The song is certified double platinum by the Recording Industry Association of America (RIAA). "Watermelon Sugar", the album's fourth single, was written in 2017, while Styles was in Nashville, Tennessee on a day off during the tour for his debut album. It was named after the post-apocolyptic Richard Brautigan novel In Watermelon Sugar (1968); the book happened to have been on a table in the recording studio. The song earned Styles his first Grammy Award in 2021. "Watermelon Sugar" is perceived to be a euphemism for cunnilingus, though Styles stated it was about the female orgasm in general. The song is certified 7× platinum by the RIAA.

"Adore You" is a disco- and funk-influenced pop song inspired by performers like Morrison, Harry Nilsson, Paul Simon and David Bowie and released as the second single of the album. On television it was performed on The Graham Norton Show and The Late Late Show with James Corden. The song is certified 5× platinum by the RIAA. "Lights Up" was one of the last songs written during production. As an R&B song with the most succinct runtime of the album, Styles presented it to the label to be the first single (contrasted with the sprawling nature of his debut single, "Sign of the Times"). Styles used it as an exercise in personal storytelling in songwriting. The song is certified double platinum by the RIAA. "Cherry" is considered to be about a jealous lover and deemed one of the album's standouts. The voice of Styles's ex-girlfriend Camille Rowe appears at the end, as she was taking a phone call in French while the song was being recorded. "Falling", a pop-soul ballad and the third single of the album, was written on piano by Kid Harpoon whilst Styles was in the shower (as such, Styles claims that he was completely naked when he co-wrote the song). The song is certified 3× platinum by the RIAA.

"To Be So Lonely" was composed on a guitalele, also known a six-string ukulele. Styles uses them for spur-of-the-moment songwriting. Composed while high on psilocybin mushrooms, "She" was initially forgotten by Styles and his producers, and they were unaware of how it was recorded until they listened to it again. Styles considers it to be a "British" song compared to his typically American-influenced performing. "Sunflower, Vol. 6" was essentially a filler track or deep cut by Styles with the goal of the audience hearing it by listening to the entire album in sequential order. "Canyon Moon" was heavily inspired by Joni Mitchell's seminal album Blue (1971), and Styles received lessons from the album's dulcimer player. He describes the track as "Crosby, Stills, and Nash on steroids." "Treat People With Kindness" came from a mantra Styles used on his first solo tour. Producer Jeff Bhasker urged him to write a song about it. The song is certified gold by the RIAA. "Fine Line" was one of the first songs written for the album. It was originally meant to be a simple song with a big outro but Styles kept expanding it by adding various arrangements until it reached it its over 6 minute runtime. The song is certified platinum by the RIAA.

== Release and promotion ==
The album was released on 13 December 2019, by Erskine and Columbia Records, Styles' second to be released under the label. The standard edition was released on CD, vinyl, digital download and streaming. The deluxe edition of the album was released on CD on 13 December 2019. Shortly before release of the album's lead single "Lights Up", the album was promoted by billboards and the caption: "Do You Know Who You Are?" in several cities around the world. Marketing for a tourism agency in Eroda, the fictitious isle Styles' team came up with, began appearing on social media; as well as a website for the isle. Styles collaborated with Spotify to organize a fan-exclusive event held at an undisclosed location in Los Angeles for a private listening party, where fans were taken to experience Eroda, an elaborate theme created for his single "Adore You".

Styles promoted the album on 16 November episode of NBC's Saturday Night Live as both a host and a musical guest. Leading up to the album's release, on 10 December, Styles also served as the guest host on The Late Late Show with James Corden. To celebrate the release and maximize sales of the album, Styles held a one-night-only show at The Forum in Los Angeles that coincided with the album's 13 December release. Styles allowed fans to pre-order his album and rewarded them with a code to have a chance to buy tickets to see him at his one-night-only show for only $25. The show in Los Angeles was followed by another show at the Electric Ballroom in London on 19 December with British rapper Stormzy as a special guest.

The album cover features Styles wearing a "hot fuchsia" silk blouse, a scoop-neck vest, and white trousers. The scene was shot using a fisheye lens and was composed by Tim Walker, whose hand is visible in the frame. i-D described the outfit as androgynous, speculating that "Fine Line" was referring to Styles blurring the lines between femininity and masculinity in the album art.

=== Singles ===
"Lights Up", the lead single from the album, was released on 11 October 2019, debuting at number 3 on the UK Singles Chart. The song features a "soft-touch re-entry into the pop slipstream", according to music writer Jon Caramanica. A music video for the song was released the same day. The song debuted at number 17 on the Billboard Hot 100.

On 2 December, Styles revealed the trailer for the album's second single, "Adore You". The song and music video were released on 6 December, with the extended version of the music video being narrated by Rosalía. "Adore You" peaked at number six on the Billboard Hot 100, becoming his first top-ten single in the country since his solo debut single, "Sign of the Times". In the singer's native, the United Kingdom, the song peaked at number seven.

A music video for "Falling" was released on 28 February. On 7 March 2020, "Falling" was officially released as the third single of the album in the UK. Peaking at number 15 on the UK Singles Chart, the song became Styles third consecutive top-fifteen single from the album. Moreover, it peaked at number 62 on the Billboard Hot 100.

"Watermelon Sugar" was released as the album's fourth single on 18 May 2020. It was originally released as a promotional single on 16 November 2019; Styles performed "Watermelon Sugar" on Saturday Night Live. Peaking at number four on the UK Singles Chart, the song became Styles third top-ten single from the album. Additionally, it peaked at number one in the US, making it his first number one single in the country.

"Golden" impacted UK contemporary hit radio on 23 October 2020, and later to US adult pop radio formats on 26 October 2020 and Top 40 on the following day as the album's fifth single.

On 1 January 2021, Styles released a music video for "Treat People with Kindness" co-starring actress Phoebe Waller-Bridge. The song later impacted UK radio on 9 January 2021 as the album's sixth single.

The title song "Fine Line" impacted on Italian radios as the album's seventh single on 19 November 2021.

=== Tour ===
Styles announced the album's support tour, Love On Tour on November 13, exactly a month before the album's release. The tour was later postponed due to the COVID-19 pandemic; the dates of the US leg of the tour were later rescheduled for fall 2021.

== Critical reception ==
Professional ratings
Aggregate scores
Source	Rating
AnyDecentMusic?	7.1/10
Metacritic	76/100
Review scores
Source	Rating
AllMusic	3.5/5 stars
The A.V. Club	B+
The Daily Telegraph	3/5 stars
The Guardian	4/5 stars
The Independent	4/5 stars
NME	4/5 stars
Now	4/5 stars
Pitchfork	6.0/10
Rolling Stone	4/5 stars
Slant Magazine	4/5 stars

Fine Line received generally positive reviews from critics. At Metacritic, which assigns a normalized rating out of 100 to reviews from professional critics, the album has an average score of 76 out of 100, based on 20 reviews.

Gregory Robinson, writing for The Guardian, regarded the album as "confident, convincing and catchy." Alexandra Pollard of The Independent stated that "it may not reach the pinnacle of sex or sadness, but Fine Line is a fine album nonetheless." Hannah Mylrea of NME found the album to be "a total joy", calling it "an elegant combination of the ex-boybander's influences, slick modern pop and his own roguish charm." Rea McNamara of NOW Magazine praised Styles' decision to lean towards "ebullient, soulful pop" while naming "Sunflower, Vol. 6" as the album's best track. Writing for Rolling Stone, Nick Catucci deemed the album "excellent" and felt that "if there's a nontoxic masculinity, Harry Styles just might've found it." David Smyth of The Evening Standard remarked that while Styles' music can not "live up to the sparkling imagery of his press profiles", his second album makes "a strong argument for being the most interesting boy band escapee yet."

Jon Pareles of The New York Times described the production as a "tour-de-force" and complimented how "Styles exults in sound, not image." Chris Willman of Variety commented that, contrary to Style's description of the record, the sensuality and melancholy are "a little on the muted side", while Styles is "still stuck" in the classic rock era that he "casually [claims] as his own." Bryan Rolli of Consequence of Sound called Fine Line an "airy, melancholy album that diplomatically addresses heartache while declining to wallow in it", complimenting his more honest songwriting but lamenting the lack of energy in his vocal performance. The Daily Telegraph's Neil McCormick characterized the album as "charming but inconsequential", while Mark Richardson of The Wall Street Journal described it as "earnest, forthright and delivered with polish", but "more imitative than original" and offering "no fresh perspective". In a mixed review, Jeremy D. Larson of Pitchfork described the "actual sound" of Fine Line as "incredible" as Styles' influences permeate the record, but considered his songwriting shallow and lacking in imagination. Tom Hull wrote similarly that it "seems pointless even when he comes up with something catchy – actually, the catchier, the more annoying it gets."

=== Year-end lists ===
Year-end lists for Fine Line
Publication	List	Rank	Ref.
Esquire	50 Best Albums of 2019	No rank given	
GQ	The albums that made 2019 great again	"Special Mention"	
Rolling Stone	50 Best Albums of 2019	23	
Uproxx	The Best Albums Of 2020	19	

== Commercial performance ==
Fine Line debuted atop the US Billboard 200 with 478,000 album-equivalent units (of which 393,000 are pure sales) in the week ending 19 December. It marked the biggest week for a pop album by a male artist in over four years. Fine Line also achieved the largest sales week from a British male artist since Nielsen SoundScan began, and made him the first UK male artist to debut at number one with first two albums. The album's tracks earned a total of 108.7 million on-demand US streams in its first week. In its second week, the album remained at number one on the chart, selling an additional 89,000 album equivalent units consisting of 47,000 pure album sales, and becoming the first pop album to spend two weeks at number one since Ed Sheeran's No.6 Collaborations Project in August 2019. According to Nielsen year-end report, Fine Line was the fifth-best selling album of the year in pure sales, with 458,000 copies—of which 354,000 were physical copies. In its third week, the album dropped to number four on the chart, earning 54,000 more units that week. In its fourth week, the album climbed to number three on the chart, earning 49,000 more units. On 15 February 2022, the album was certified triple platinum by the Recording Industry Association of America (RIAA) for combined sales and album-equivalent units of three million units in the United States. Fine Line is one of only three albums released in 2019 to have sold a million copies in traditional album sales in the US.

After debuting at number 3 on the UK Album Charts in December 2019, the album peaked at number 2 in its 56th week in the top 100 on 14 January 2021 (week ending) behind Taylor Swift's Evermore. On 16 October 2020, it was certified platinum by the British Phonographic Industry (BPI) for selling over 300,000 units in the UK. The album has shifted over 500.000 units to date in the UK.

== Accolades ==
Awards and nominations for Fine Line
Organization	Year	Category	Result	Ref.
Brit Awards	2020	Album of the Year	Nominated	
American Music Awards	2020	Favorite Pop/Rock Album	Won	
ARIA Music Awards	2020	Best International Artist (Fine Line)	Won	
Danish Music Awards	2020	International Album of the Year	Nominated	
LOS40 Music Awards	2020	International Album of the Year	Nominated	
Grammy Awards	2021	Best Pop Vocal Album	Nominated	
Juno Awards	2021	International Album of the Year	Won	
Grammy Awards	2022	Best Immersive Audio Album	Nominated	

== Track listing ==
Fine Line
No.	Title	Writer(s)	Producer(s)	Length
1.	"Golden"	Harry Styles; Thomas Hull; Tyler Johnson; Mitch Rowland	Johnson	3:28
2.	"Watermelon Sugar"	Styles; Hull; Johnson; Rowland	Kid Harpoon; Johnson	2:53
3.	"Adore You"	Styles; Hull; Johnson; Amy Allen	Kid Harpoon	3:27
4.	"Lights Up"	Styles; Hull; Johnson	Johnson	2:52
5.	"Cherry"	Styles; Hull; Johnson; Jeff Bhasker; Sammy Witte	Johnson; Witte	4:19
6.	"Falling"	Styles; Hull	Kid Harpoon	4:00
7.	"To Be So Lonely"	Styles; Hull; Johnson; Rowland	Kid Harpoon; Johnson	3:12
8.	"She"	Styles; Hull; Rowland; Bhasker	Kid Harpoon	6:02
9.	"Sunflower, Vol. 6"	Styles; Hull; Greg Kurstin	Kurstin	3:41
10.	"Canyon Moon"	Styles; Hull; Rowland	Kid Harpoon	3:09
11.	"Treat People with Kindness"	Styles; Bhasker; Ilsey Juber	Bhasker	3:17
12.	"Fine Line"	Styles; Hull; Johnson; Rowland; Witte	Kid Harpoon; Johnson	6:17
Total length:				46:37

== Personnel ==
Credits adapted from the album's liner notes.

Musicians

- Harry Styles – lead vocals (all tracks), background vocals (tracks 1–10, 12), dulcimer (track 10), acoustic guitar (track 12)
- Kid Harpoon (Thomas Hull) – production (tracks 2–3, 6–8, 10, 12), co-production (track 1), additional production (tracks 4, 5), electric guitar (tracks 2–4, 8, 10), acoustic guitar (tracks 1, 2, 10, 12), background vocals (tracks 1, 2, 7), moog bass (tracks 1, 6, 7), piano (tracks 2, 6, 8), bass (tracks 3, 5, 10), keyboards (tracks 3, 8, 10), drums (tracks 3, 9), drum programming (track 3), organ (track 6)
- Tyler Johnson – production (tracks 1, 2, 4, 5, 7, 12), co-production (tracks 3, 8), additional production (tracks 6, 10), keyboards (tracks 1–5, 12), background vocals (tracks 1, 2, 4, 7), drum programming (tracks 3, 4), drums, bass & acoustic guitar (track 4), programming & electric guitar (track 5), piano & moog bass (track 12)
- Mitch Rowland – electric guitar (tracks 1, 2, 7, 8, 10, 12), drums (tracks 1, 2, 7, 8, 12), slide guitar (tracks 1, 2, 5, 10), acoustic guitar (tracks 7, 10), glockenspiel (track 1), background vocals (track 7)
- Greg Kurstin – production, bass, drums, guitar, organ, clav & electric sitar (track 9)
- Jeff Bhasker – piano (tracks 8, 11), production, strings arrangement, strings conducting, background vocals, mellotron (track 11)
- Ivan Jackson – horns (tracks 2, 4, 12)
- Jon Castelli – drum programming (track 7)
- Aaron Sterling – drums (tracks 5, 7), percussion (track 7)
- Gabe Noel – cello, double bass & sarangi (track 7)
- Morgan Kibby – keyboards, moog bass & background vocals (track 12)
- Leo Abrahams – electric guitar (tracks 1, 6)
- Pino Palladino– bass (tracks 2, 8)
- Davey Chegwidden – percussion (tracks 2, 10)
- Jason White – choir contracting (track 4), choir conducting (track 11)
- Nikki Grier (Nikisha Daniel) – choir vocals (tracks 4, 11)
- Tiffany Smith – choir vocals (tracks 4, 11)
- Tiffany Stevenson – choir vocals (tracks 4, 11)
- Brandon Winbush – choir vocals (tracks 4, 11)
- David Campbell – strings arrangement (track 5), orchestra arrangement (track 12)
- Sarah Jones – background vocals (track 2)
- Amy Allen – background vocals (track 3)
- Ian Fitchuk – congas (track 4)
- James Gadson – drums (track 8)
- John Carroll Kirby – keyboards (track 10)
- Jess Wolfe – vocals (track 11)
- Holly Laessig – vocals (track 11)
- Jason Morales – choir vocals (track 11)
- Nick Movshon – bass (track 11)
- Laurence Juber – electric guitar (track 11)
- Homer Steinweiss – drums (track 11)
- Serena Göransson – violin (track 11)
- Tereza Stanislav – violin (track 11)
- Jonathan Moerschel – viola (track 11)
- Jacob Braun – cello (track 11)
- Elizabeth Pupo-Walker – congas (track 11)

Technical

- Greg Penny – Dolby Atmos & Sony 360 Reality Audio Mix (2022 Grammy Nominee Grammy - Best Immersive Audio Album)
- Jeremy Hatcher – engineering (tracks 3, 4), engineering assistance (tracks 1, 5, 7, 8)
- Oli Jacobs – engineering assistance (tracks 1, 2, 5, 7, 12)
- Oli Middleton – engineering assistance (tracks 1, 2, 5, 7, 12)
- Jon Castelli – additional engineering (tracks 1, 7), mixing (track 4)
- Rob Bisel – engineering (track 5), engineering assistance (tracks 1, 5, 8)
- Kevin Smith – engineering assistance (tracks 1, 5, 7, 8)
- Tyler Beans – engineering assistance (tracks 1, 5, 8)
- Dylan Neustadter – engineering assistance (tracks 1, 5, 8)
- Nick Lobel – engineering (tracks 2, 4), additional engineering (tracks 1, 7), mixing (track 7)
- Mark Rankin – engineering (tracks 2, 5, 7, 8), additional engineering (track 1)
- Matt Tuggle – engineering assistance (tracks 2–4)
- Dan Ewins – engineering assistance (tracks 2, 6, 12)
- Kid Harpoon (Thomas Hull) – engineering (track 3)
- Tyler Johnson – engineering (track 4), mixing (track 7)
- Matthew Wallick – engineering assistance (track 4)
- Ingmar Carlson – mixing assistance (track 4)
- Greg Kurstin – engineering (track 9)
- Julian Burg – engineering (track 9)
- Alex Pasco – engineering (track 9)
- Jens Jungkurth – engineering (track 11)
- Ryan Nasci – engineering (track 11)
- Randy Merrill – mastering

Art

- Molly Hawkins – creative director
- Hélène Pambrun – photography
- Tim Walker – photography
- Bradley Pinkerton – graphic design

== Charts ==
=== Weekly charts ===
Weekly chart performance for Fine Line
Chart (2019–2021)	Peak position
Argentine Albums (CAPIF)	1
Australian Albums (ARIA)	1
Austrian Albums (Ö3 Austria)	4
Belgian Albums (Ultratop Flanders)	1
Belgian Albums (Ultratop Wallonia)	19
Canadian Albums (Billboard)	1
Croatian International Albums (HDU)	1
Czech Albums (ČNS IFPI)	67
Danish Albums (Hitlisten)	4
Dutch Albums (Album Top 100)	1
Estonian Albums (Eesti Ekspress)	2
Finnish Albums (Suomen virallinen lista)	5
French Albums (SNEP)	36
German Albums (Offizielle Top 100)	14
Greek Albums (IFPI Greece)	2
Hungarian Albums (MAHASZ)	15
Icelandic Albums (Tónlistinn)	2
Irish Albums (IRMA)	1
Italian Albums (FIMI)	7
Japan Hot Albums (Billboard Japan)	63
Japanese Albums (Oricon)	52
Lithuanian Albums (AGATA)	1
Mexican Albums (AMPROFON)	1
New Zealand Albums (RMNZ)	1
Norwegian Albums (VG-lista)	2
Polish Albums (ZPAV)	5
Portuguese Albums (AFP)	1
Scottish Albums (Official Charts)	3
Slovak Albums (ČNS IFPI)	6
South Korean Albums (Gaon)	40
Spanish Albums (Promusicae)	6
Swedish Albums (Sverigetopplistan)	1
Swiss Albums (Schweizer Hitparade)	6
UK Albums (Official Charts)	2
US Billboard 200	1
US Indie Store Album Sales (Billboard)	1

=== Year-end charts ===
2019 year-end chart performance for Fine Line
Chart (2019)	Position
Australian Albums (ARIA)	42
Mexican Albums (AMPROFON)	24
New Zealand Albums (RMNZ)	41
UK Albums (OCC)	90
US Top 10 Albums (Total Sales)	5
Worldwide Albums (IFPI)	12

2020 year-end chart performance for Fine Line
Chart (2020)	Position
Australian Albums (ARIA)	1
Austrian Albums (Ö3 Austria)	12
Belgian Albums (Ultratop Flanders)	11
Belgian Albums (Ultratop Wallonia)	61
Canadian Albums (Billboard)	2
Danish Albums (Hitlisten)	8
Dutch Albums (Album Top 100)	5
French Albums (SNEP)	100
German Albums (Offizielle Top 100)	50
Global Album All Format (IFPI)	5
Hungarian Albums (MAHASZ)	42
Icelandic Albums (Tónlistinn)	6
Irish Albums (IRMA)	3
Italian Albums (FIMI)	13
Polish Albums (ZPAV)	33
New Zealand Albums (RMNZ)	2
Norwegian Albums (VG-lista)	6
Portuguese Albums (AFP)	2
Spanish Albums (PROMUSICAE)	10
Swedish Albums (Sverigetopplistan)	8
Swiss Albums (Schweizer Hitparade)	22
UK Albums (OCC)	2
US Billboard 200	4
US Tastemakers Albums (Billboard)	5
US Top 10 Albums (Total Sales)	4

2021 year-end chart performance for Fine Line
Chart (2021)	Position
Australian Albums (ARIA)	7
Austrian Albums (Ö3 Austria)	10
Belgian Albums (Ultratop Flanders)	8
Belgian Albums (Ultratop Wallonia)	66
Canadian Albums (Billboard)	15
Danish Albums (Hitlisten)	11
Dutch Albums (Album Top 100)	10
French Albums (SNEP)	95
German Albums (Offizielle Top 100)	47
Hungarian Albums (MAHASZ)	54
Icelandic Albums (Tónlistinn)	8
Irish Albums (IRMA)	10
Italian Albums (FIMI)	30
New Zealand Albums (RMNZ)	11
Norwegian Albums (VG-lista)	14
Polish Albums (ZPAV)	70
Spanish Albums (PROMUSICAE)	13
Swedish Albums (Sverigetopplistan)	20
Swiss Albums (Schweizer Hitparade)	35
UK Albums (OCC)	12
US Billboard 200	16

2022 year-end chart performance for Fine Line
Chart (2022)	Position
Australian Albums (ARIA)	7
Austrian Albums (Ö3 Austria)	12
Belgian Albums (Ultratop Flanders)	15
Belgian Albums (Ultratop Wallonia)	75
Canadian Albums (Billboard)	26
Danish Albums (Hitlisten)	21
Dutch Albums (Album Top 100)	10
French Albums (SNEP)	132
German Albums (Offizielle Top 100)	36
Icelandic Albums (Tónlistinn)	12
Italian Albums (FIMI)	79
Lithuanian Albums (AGATA)	9
New Zealand Albums (RMNZ)	12
Spanish Albums (PROMUSICAE)	28
Swedish Albums (Sverigetopplistan)	33
Swiss Albums (Schweizer Hitparade)	58
UK Albums (OCC)	16
US Billboard 200	33

2023 year-end chart performance for Fine Line
Chart (2023)	Position
Australian Albums (ARIA)	25
Austrian Albums (Ö3 Austria)	24
Belgian Albums (Ultratop Flanders)	14
Belgian Albums (Ultratop Wallonia)	97
Danish Albums (Hitlisten)	37
Dutch Albums (Album Top 100)	15
German Albums (Offizielle Top 100)	65
Hungarian Albums (MAHASZ)	84
Icelandic Albums (Tónlistinn)	34
New Zealand Albums (RMNZ)	20
Polish Albums (ZPAV)	76
Swedish Albums (Sverigetopplistan)	71
Swiss Albums (Schweizer Hitparade)	96
UK Albums (OCC)	30
US Billboard 200	80

2024 year-end chart performance for Fine Line
Chart (2024)	Position
Australian Albums (ARIA)	76
Belgian Albums (Ultratop Flanders)	54
Belgian Albums (Ultratop Wallonia)	200
Dutch Albums (Album Top 100)	52
Icelandic Albums (Tónlistinn)	86
UK Albums (OCC)	99

2025 year-end chart performance for Fine Line
Chart (2025)	Position
Belgian Albums (Ultratop Flanders)	102

== Certifications and sales ==
Certifications and sales for Fine Line
Region	Certification	Certified units/sales
Australia (ARIA)	3× Platinum	210,000^{‡}
Austria (IFPI Austria)	Platinum	15,000^{‡}
Belgium (BRMA)	Gold	10,000^{‡}
Brazil (Pro-Música Brasil)	2× Diamond	320,000^{‡}
Canada (Music Canada)	4× Platinum	320,000^{‡}
Denmark (IFPI Danmark)	5× Platinum	100,000^{‡}
France (SNEP)	2× Platinum	200,000^{‡}
Germany (BVMI)	Platinum	200,000^{‡}
Iceland (FHF)	Gold	5,755
Italy (FIMI)	3× Platinum	150,000^{‡}
Mexico (AMPROFON)	Diamond+2× Platinum	420,000^{‡}
New Zealand (RMNZ)	6× Platinum	90,000^{‡}
Norway (IFPI Norway)	Platinum	20,000^{‡}
Poland (ZPAV)	Diamond	100,000^{‡}
Portugal (AFP)	Platinum	15,000^{^}
Singapore (RIAS)	Platinum	10,000^{*}
Spain (Promusicae)	Platinum	40,000^{‡}
Sweden (GLF)	Platinum	30,000^{‡}
Switzerland (IFPI Switzerland)	Platinum	20,000^{‡}
United Kingdom (BPI)	3× Platinum	900,000^{‡}
United States (RIAA)	3× Platinum	3,000,000^{‡}
^{*} Sales figures based on certification alone.^{^} Shipments figures based on certification alone.^{‡} Sales+streaming figures based on certification alone.

== Release history ==
Release formats for Fine Line
Region	Date	Format	Edition	Label	Ref.
Various	13 December 2019	Digital download; streaming; CD; LP	Standard	Erskine; Columbia	
Various	13 December 2019	CD	Deluxe	Erskine; Columbia	
Various	11 December 2020	LP	First anniversary vinyl box set	Erskine; Columbia	
