= Golden (Harry Styles song) =

2020 single by Harry Styles

Single by Harry Styles

from the album Fine Line
- Released: 23 October 2020
- Studio: Real World (Bath, Somerset); Shangri-La (Malibu); Groove Masters (Santa Monica); Harpoon House (Los Angeles)
- Genre: Indie pop; soft rock
- Length: 3:28
- Label: Erskine; Columbia
- Songwriters: Harry Styles; Mitch Rowland; Tyler Johnson; Thomas Hull
- Producer: Tyler Johnson

Harry Styles singles chronology
"Watermelon Sugar" (2020)	"Golden" (2020)	"Treat People with Kindness" (2021)

Music video
- "Golden" on YouTube

"Golden" is a song by English singer-songwriter Harry Styles from his second studio album, Fine Line (2019). The song was written by Styles alongside Mitch Rowland, Tyler Johnson and Kid Harpoon, with Johnson and Harpoon handling the production and co-production, respectively. The song was serviced to contemporary hit radio formats in the United Kingdom on 23 October 2020 as the album's fifth single. In the US, the song was serviced to adult contemporary and contemporary hit radio formats on 26 and 27 October 2020 respectively. This song peaked at number 26 on the UK Singles Chart and at number 57 on the US Billboard Hot 100.

== Composition ==
"Golden" is an indie pop and soft rock song, with a 1970s and Southern California sound. Sheet music for the song shows a time signature of |4/4 in the key of G major, with a moderately fast tempo of 140 beats per minute. The vocal line ranges from D_{3} to B_{4}. The song incorporates clusters of background harmonies and is filled with twinkling glockenspiel.

== Music video ==
The music video for "Golden" was directed by Ben Turner and Gabe Turner, and premiered on 26 October 2020. In the music video, Styles is shown running, swimming, and driving a car along the Amalfi Coast in Italy.

== Accolades ==
Awards and nominations for "Golden"
Organization	Year	Category	Result	Ref.
MTV Millennial Awards	2021	Global Hit of the Year	Won	
Nickelodeon Mexico Kids' Choice Awards	2021	Global Hit	Nominated	
BMI Pop Awards	2022	Most Performed Songs of the Year	Won	

== Credits and personnel ==
Credits adapted from the liner notes of Fine Line.

=== Recording ===
- Recorded at Real World Studios (Bath, Somerset), Shangri-La (Malibu, California), Groove Masters (Santa Monica, California), and Harpoon House (Los Angeles, California)
- Mixed at EastWest Studios (Los Angeles, California)
- Mastered at Sterling Sound (Edgewater, New Jersey)

=== Personnel ===
- Harry Styles – vocals, backing vocals, songwriting
- Tyler Johnson – production, songwriting, backing vocals, keyboards
- Kid Harpoon – co-production, songwriting, backing vocals, synth moog bass, acoustic guitar
- Mitch Rowland – songwriting, drums, slide guitar, glockenspiel, electric guitar
- Leo Abrahams – electric guitar
- Sammy Witte – engineering
- Jon Castelli – additional engineering
- Mark Rankin – additional engineering
- Nick Lobel – additional engineering
- Dylan Neustadter – assistant engineering
- Jeremy Hatcher – assistant engineering
- Kevin Smith – assistant engineering
- Oli Jacobs – assistant engineering
- Oliver Middleton – assistant engineering
- Rob Bisel – assistant engineering
- Tyler Beans – assistant engineering
- Spike Stent – mixing
- Michael Freeman – mix assistant
- Randy Merrill – mastering

== Charts ==
=== Weekly charts ===
Weekly chart performance for "Golden"
Chart (2019–2021)	Peak position
Argentina Hot 100 (Billboard)	21
Australia (ARIA)	39
Belgium (Ultratop 50 Flanders)	37
Belgium (Ultratip Bubbling Under Wallonia)	11
Brazil (Top 100 Brasil)	55
Canada Hot 100 (Billboard)	45
Canada AC (Billboard)	49
Canada CHR/Top 40 (Billboard)	15
Canada Hot AC (Billboard)	21
CIS Airplay (TopHit)	163
Croatia (HRT)	6
Czech Republic Singles Digital (ČNS IFPI)	80
Czech Republic Airplay (ČNS IFPI)	2
El Salvador (Monitor Latino)	7
Euro Digital Song Sales (Billboard)	11
Finland (Radiosoittolista)	43
Global 200 (Billboard)	62
Greece (IFPI)	46
Hungary (Rádiós Top 40)	24
Iceland (Tónlistinn)	16
Ireland (IRMA)	23
Italy (FIMI)	62
Latvia (LAIPA)	46
Lithuania (AGATA)	21
Mexico Airplay (Billboard)	2
Mexico Ingles Airplay (Billboard)	1
Netherlands (Dutch Top 40)	21
Netherlands (Single Top 100)	55
New Zealand (Recorded Music NZ)	40
Portugal (AFP)	55
Portugal Airplay (AFP)	7
San Marino (SMRRTV Top 50)	2
Scottish Singles Sales (Official Charts)	32
Slovakia Airplay (ČNS IFPI)	4
Slovakia Singles Digital (ČNS IFPI)	63
Sweden (Sverigetopplistan)	74
UK Singles (Official Charts)	26
US Billboard Hot 100	57
US Adult Contemporary (Billboard)	18
US Adult Pop Airplay (Billboard)	8
US Dance Airplay (Billboard)	36
US Pop Airplay (Billboard)	13

=== Monthly charts ===
Monthly chart performance for "Golden"
Chart (April 2021)	Peak position
Paraguay Airplay (SGP)	43

=== Year-end charts ===
Year-end chart performance for "Golden"
Chart (2021)	Position
Croatia International Airplay (Top lista)	61
Global 200 (Billboard)	190
US Adult Contemporary (Billboard)	49
Portugal (AFP)	198
US Adult Top 40 (Billboard)	28
US Mainstream Top 40 (Billboard)	37

Year-end chart performance
Chart (2025)	Position
Argentina Anglo Airplay (Monitor Latino)	83

== Certifications ==
Certifications and sales for "Golden"
Region	Certification	Certified units/sales
Australia (ARIA)	3× Platinum	210,000^{‡}
Austria (IFPI Austria)	Gold	15,000^{‡}
Brazil (Pro-Música Brasil)	Diamond	160,000^{‡}
Canada (Music Canada)	2× Platinum	160,000^{‡}
Denmark (IFPI Danmark)	Platinum	90,000^{‡}
France (SNEP)	Gold	100,000^{‡}
Italy (FIMI)	Platinum	70,000^{‡}
Mexico (AMPROFON)	Diamond+2× Platinum+Gold	450,000^{‡}
New Zealand (RMNZ)	2× Platinum	60,000^{‡}
Poland (ZPAV)	Platinum	50,000^{‡}
Portugal (AFP)	Platinum	10,000^{‡}
Spain (Promusicae)	Platinum	60,000^{‡}
United Kingdom (BPI)	2× Platinum	1,200,000^{‡}
United States (RIAA)	2× Platinum	2,000,000^{‡}
Streaming
Greece (IFPI Greece)	Gold	1,000,000^{†}
^{‡} Sales+streaming figures based on certification alone.^{†} Streaming-only figures based on certification alone.

== Release history ==
Release dates and formats for "Golden"
Region	Date	Format(s)	Label	Ref.
United Kingdom	23 October 2020	Contemporary hit radio	Erskine; Columbia	
United States	30 September 2020 (Note: Release as a promotional single)	Contemporary hit radio; adult contemporary radio	Columbia	
United States	26 October 2020	Adult contemporary radio	Columbia	
United States	27 October 2020	Contemporary hit radio	Columbia	
Italy	6 November 2020	Radio airplay	Sony	
