= Treat People with Kindness =

2021 single by Harry Styles

Single by Harry Styles

from the album Fine Line
- Released: 9 January 2021
- Recorded: 2019
- Genre: Gospel; pop; rock and roll; retro-soul
- Length: 3:17
- Label: Erskine; Columbia
- Songwriters: Harry Styles; Jeff Bhasker; Ilsey Juber
- Producer: Jeff Bhasker

Harry Styles singles chronology
"Golden" (2020)	"Treat People with Kindness" (2021)	"Fine Line" (2021)

Music video
- "Treat People with Kindness" on YouTube

"Treat People with Kindness" is a song by Harry Styles, recorded for his second album, Fine Line (2019). The song was originally released on the album on 13 December 2019 by Columbia and Erskine Records and features background vocals from the New York indie-pop band Lucius. The song was serviced to adult contemporary radio formats in the United Kingdom on 9 January 2021 as the album's sixth single. In an interview with Music Week, Styles credits a David Bowie interview for the inspiration behind the song, referring to it as a "tribute".

== Recording ==
Styles was inspired to write the song after adopting the titular phrase as the slogan for his 2018 tour. It was written during the end of the Fine Line recordings sessions with frequent collaborator producer Jeff Bhasker and songwriter Ilsey Juber.

The instrumental features Bhasker on keys, Juber's father Laurence on guitar, Elizabeth Pupo-Walker on congas, and Nick Movshon and Homer Steinweiss on electric bass and drums, respectively; the latter three are associated with New York City's contemporary soul and funk music scene and Daptone Records, and some of the recording took place at Movshon and Steinweiss' studio The Diamond Mine. Concurrently, Bhasker, Juber, Movshon, and Steinwiess were collaborating on Mark Ronson's album Late Night Feelings. Recorded at EastWest Studio in Los Angeles, a string quartet arranged by Bhasker and members of the Sunday Service Choir fill in the track.

Lucius frontwomen Jess Wolfe and Holly Laessig were invited to the studio to work with Styles on a different song; during their sessions, Styles asked them to sing on the instrumental recording. Styles would later record his vocals. As noted by Lucius, the women's vocals are a central feature of the song; in an unrelated interview with the Los Angeles Times in 2022, the duo stated they had asked Styles to be credited as a featured artist after learning how prominently they featured in the song.

== Promotion ==
Styles was first spotted in 2017 with a 'Treat People With Kindness' badge on his guitar strap during a concert for his debut, self-titled album, which sparked interest amongst the artist's fanbase. Styles revealed that as he "saw a lot of t-shirts around" with the phrase, referring to it as a "mantra", he became inspired to write the song. Styles released a line of merchandise with the phrase, in celebration of Pride Month. This consisted of t-shirts, hats, and hoodies. Through 'Treat People with Kindness', he began with his first merchandise release in relation to the song in June 2018, through which he collaborated with the US organisation GLSEN. Styles release t-shirts, hats and hoodies with the slogan to raise awareness for the organisation with all profits being donated.

In October 2019, fans of Styles noticed billboards around London and New York with 'Do You Know Who You Are', which was quickly linked to 'Treat People with Kindness' by the singer's fans. Following these promotions and the eventual 2019 release of 'Fine Line', Styles continued to promote 'Treat People With Kindness' through regular merchandise releases with the phrase.

As part of the 'Treat People with Kindness' slogan, Styles released a t-shirt with "Stay home. Stay safe. Protect each other", on the front, and "This T-shirt fights COVID-19 treat people with kindness". Styles revealed that all profits made from the shirt would be donated to the World Health Organization's Solidarity Response Fund, a UN foundation. In October 2020, Styles released limited edition 'Treat People with Kindness' socks. The socks were available for fans to purchase for 24 hours, with a portion of proceeds being donated to Choose Love, a charity which supports refugees.

== Music video ==
The music video is directed by Gabe and Ben Turner, who have previously worked with Styles for past music videos, and was released on 1 January 2021, and features actress and writer Phoebe Waller-Bridge. Turner reveals that this idea led Styles to personally asking Waller-Bridge to feature in the video. Turner states that the influence for the dance was inspired by a 1940s Nicholas Brothers dance scene from Stormy Weather, which led to the idea of having Styles perform with a dance partner. The music video choreographer, Paul Roberts, explained that he also had gained inspiration for the dance from Fred Astaire and Gene Kelly.

== Critical reception ==
Critical response to "Treat People with Kindness" was generally mixed. Graham Reid regarded it as "feel-good" but obligatory and guilty of virtue signalling. In Consequence, Bryan Rolli accused Styles of "sleepwalking" throughout the song and leaving the "heavy-lifting to the gospel singers", while Ellen Johnson of Paste said that the "Queen-indebted anthem" features "off-pitch singers".

More critical was Pitchfork reviewer Jeremy D. Larson, who pointed to "Treat People with Kindess" as an example of Styles' superficial use of his studio musicians on Fine Line. "An awful chimera of Jesus Christ Superstar and Edgar Winter Group's 'Free Ride' that confuses hand-claps with happiness", Larson called the song. Laura Snapes of The Guardian referred to it as an "unnecessary" and "toothless" take on gospel.

Some critics were more positive. NME writer Hannah Myrleah referred to the song as "another banging pop tune", while Gregory Robinson from The Guardian found it "jolly" and called it "old school rock'n'roll". Emma Swan of DIY described it as a "wonderfully kitsch '70s Motown stomp".

== Accolades ==
Awards and nominations for "Treat People with Kindness"
Organization	Year	Category	Result	Ref.
MTV Video Music Awards	2021	Best Pop	Nominated	
MTV Video Music Awards	2021	Best Choreography	Won	
MTV Video Music Awards	2021	Best Editing	Nominated	

== Charts ==
Chart performance for "Treat People with Kindness"
Chart (2019–2021)	Peak position
Belgium (Ultratop 50 Flanders)	50
Colombia Anglo (Monitor Latino)	15
Costa Rica Anglo (Monitor Latino)	5
Croatia (HRT)	46
Dominican Republic Anglo (Monitor Latino)	19
Ecuador Anglo (Monitor Latino)	16
Ireland (IRMA)	73
Lithuania (AGATA)	90
New Zealand Hot Singles (RMNZ)	8
Paraguay Anglo (Monitor Latino)	13
Portugal Airplay (AFP)	86
UK Singles Downloads (Official Charts)	27
Uruguay Anglo (Monitor Latino)	8
US Bubbling Under Hot 100 (Billboard)	18

== Certifications ==
Certifications and sales for "Treat People with Kindness"
Region	Certification	Certified units/sales
Brazil (Pro-Música Brasil)	Platinum	40,000^{‡}
Mexico (AMPROFON)	Gold	30,000^{‡}
New Zealand (RMNZ)	Gold	15,000^{‡}
United Kingdom (BPI)	Silver	200,000^{‡}
United States (RIAA)	Gold	500,000^{‡}
^{‡} Sales+streaming figures based on certification alone.

== Release history ==
Release dates and formats for "Treat People with Kindness"
Region	Date	Format	Label	Ref.
United Kingdom	9 January 2021	Adult contemporary radio	Erskine; Columbia	
