= Harry Styles discography =

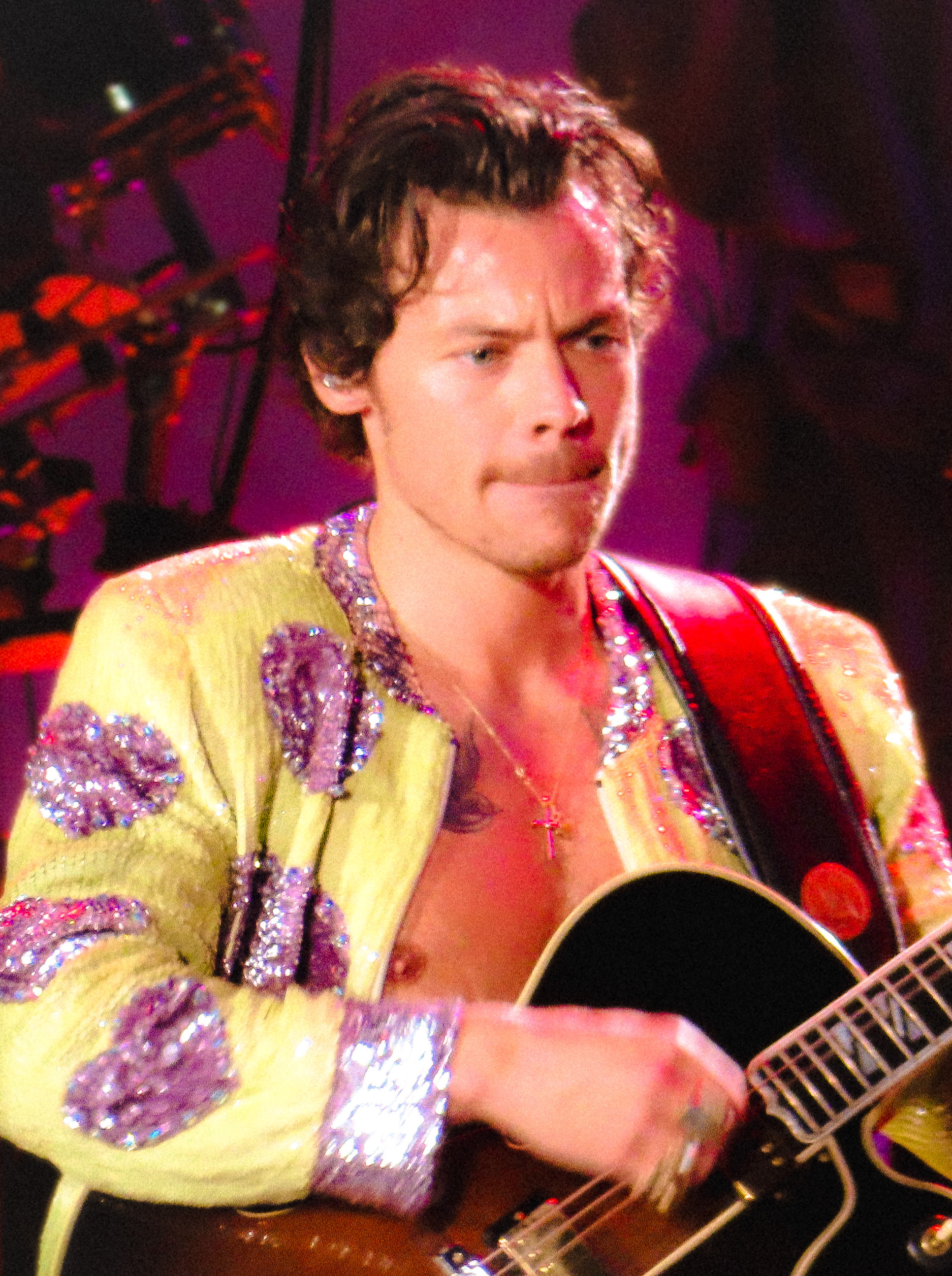
- Styles in December 2022
- Studio albums: 4
- EPs: 1
- Singles: 17
- Video albums: 1
- Music videos: 15
- Promotional singles: 1

As a solo artist, English singer-songwriter Harry Styles has released four studio albums, one extended play (EP), one video album, seventeen singles, fifteen music videos, and one promotional single.

Styles's music career began in 2010 as a member of the boy band One Direction. Following the group's indefinite hiatus in 2016, he signed a recording contract with Columbia Records as a solo artist the same year. In April 2017, Styles released his debut single, "Sign of the Times". It reached number one on the UK Singles Chart and number four on the US Billboard Hot 100, while also topping the singles chart in Australia; it received multi-platinum certifications in various countries worldwide.

Styles released his eponymous debut studio album in May 2017, reaching number one in various countries worldwide. It was certified double platinum in Australia, New Zealand, the United Kingdom, and the United States. With over a million copies sold globally, it became one of the best-selling albums of 2017. The other singles from Harry Styles were "Two Ghosts" and "Kiwi". In 2018, during Harry Styles: Live on Tour, Styles played two unreleased songs: "Medicine" and "Anna".

In December 2019, Styles released his second studio album, Fine Line, which was preceded by the singles "Lights Up" and "Adore You", both of which became top-ten hits on several singles charts. Fine Line debuted atop the US Billboard 200, recording the highest first-week sales by a British male act in the United States. Styles also became the first British male artist to have his first two albums debut atop the Billboard 200. Fine Line received multi-platinum certifications in various countries worldwide and spawned five more singles: "Falling", "Watermelon Sugar", "Golden", "Treat People with Kindness", and "Fine Line". "Watermelon Sugar" became Styles's first song to reach number one in the United States.

Styles's third studio album, Harry's House, was released in May 2022. It reached number one and received multi-platinum certifications in various countries worldwide. The album features four singles: "As It Was", "Late Night Talking", "Music for a Sushi Restaurant", and "Satellite". "As It Was" topped the Billboard Hot 100 for 15 non-consecutive weeks and was the best-selling global single of 2022.

== Albums ==
=== Studio albums ===
List of studio albums, with selected details, chart positions, sales, and certifications
| Title | Studio album details | Peak chart positions | | | | | | | | | | Sales (Note: Pure sales and not equivalent units (streaming and song downloads).) | Certifications |
| Title | Studio album details | UK | AUS | BEL (FL) | CAN | IRE | NLD | NZ | SWE | SWI | US | Sales | Certifications |
|---|---|---|---|---|---|---|---|---|---|---|---|---|---|
| Harry Styles | Released: 12 May 2017; Label: Erskine, Columbia; Format: CD, LP, digital download, streaming | 1 | 1 | 1 | 1 | 1 | 1 | 2 | 3 | 3 | 1 | UK: 416,109 (Note: United Kingdom sales figures for Harry Styles as of May 2022.); US: 386,000 (Note: United States sales figures for Harry Styles as of January 2018.) | BPI: 2× Platinum; ARIA: 2× Platinum; BEA: Gold; GLF: Gold; IFPI SWI: Gold; MC: Platinum; NVPI: Gold; RIAA: 2× Platinum; RMNZ: 3× Platinum |
| Fine Line | Released: 13 December 2019; Label: Erskine, Columbia; Format: CD, LP, digital download, streaming, cassette | 2 | 1 | 1 | 1 | 1 | 1 | 1 | 1 | 6 | 1 | UK: 607,520 (Note: United Kingdom sales figures for Fine Line as of May 2022.); CAN: 70,000 (Note: Canada sales figures for Fine Line in 2019 (42,000) and 2020 (28,000).); US: 1,000,000 (Note: United States sales figures for Fine Line as of December 2021.) | BPI: 3× Platinum; ARIA: 3× Platinum; BEA: Gold; GLF: Platinum; IFPI SWI: Platinum; MC: 4× Platinum; RIAA: 3× Platinum; RMNZ: 6× Platinum |
| Harry's House | Released: 20 May 2022; Label: Erskine, Columbia; Format: CD, LP, digital download, streaming, cassette | 1 | 1 | 1 | 1 | 1 | 1 | 1 | 1 | 1 | 1 | UK: 160,000 (Note: United Kingdom sales figures for Harry's House as of January 2023.); US: 757,000 (Note: United States sales figures for Harry's House as of January 2023.) | BPI: 3× Platinum; ARIA: 2× Platinum; GLF: Platinum; MC: 2× Platinum; RIAA: 2× Platinum; RMNZ: 5× Platinum |
| Kiss All the Time. Disco, Occasionally. | Released: 6 March 2026; Label: Erskine, Columbia; Format: CD, LP, digital download, streaming, cassette | 1 | 1 | 1 | 1 | 1 | 1 | 1 | 1 | 1 | 1 | US: 384,000 | BPI: Platinum; GLF: Gold; MC: Gold; NVPI: Platinum; RMNZ: Gold |

=== Video albums ===
| Title | Details | Notes |
|---|---|---|
| Harry Styles: Behind the Album | Released: 15 May 2017; Label: Erskine, Columbia; Format: Streaming | Exclusively released on the music-streaming service Apple Music, it is a documentary showing the making of his debut album with a runtime of 49 minutes. The Performances version includes a full-length live performance of the album recorded at Abbey Road Studios. |

== Extended plays ==
| Title | Details | Notes |
|---|---|---|
| Spotify Singles | Released: 27 September 2017; Label: Erskine, Columbia; Format: Streaming | A two-track EP exclusively recorded for Spotify. It consists of live performances of "Two Ghosts" and Little Big Town's "Girl Crush". |

== Singles ==
=== As lead artist ===
| Title | Year | Peak chart positions | | | | | | | | | | Certifications | Album |
| Title | Year | UK | AUS | BEL (FL) | CAN | IRE | NLD | NZ | SWE | SWI | US | Certifications | Album |
|---|---|---|---|---|---|---|---|---|---|---|---|---|---|
| "Sign of the Times" | 2017 | 1 | 1 | 8 | 6 | 6 | 26 | 6 | 15 | 4 | 4 | BPI: 4× Platinum; ARIA: 7× Platinum; BEA: Platinum; GLF: 2× Platinum; IFPI SWI: 2× Platinum; MC: 4× Platinum; RIAA: 5× Platinum; RMNZ: 6× Platinum | Harry Styles |
| "Two Ghosts" | 2017 | 58 | — | — (Note: "Two Ghosts" did not enter the Ultratop 50, but peaked at number five on the Flemish Ultratip chart.) | 91 | 66 | — | — | — | — | — (Note: "Two Ghosts" did not chart on the Billboard Hot 100, but peaked at number 18 on the Bubbling Under Hot 100 chart.) | BPI: Gold; ARIA: Platinum; MC: Gold; RIAA: Platinum; RMNZ: Platinum | Harry Styles |
| "Kiwi" | 2017 | 66 | 92 | 39 | — | 72 | — | — | — | — | — | BPI: Platinum; ARIA: Platinum; MC: Gold; RIAA: Platinum; RMNZ: Platinum | Harry Styles |
| "Lights Up" | 2019 | 3 | 7 | — (Note: "Lights Up" did not enter the Ultratop 50, but peaked at number two on the Flemish Ultratip chart.) | 14 | 4 | 36 | 7 | 15 | 22 | 17 | BPI: Platinum; ARIA: 2× Platinum; MC: 2× Platinum; RIAA: 2× Platinum; RMNZ: 2× Platinum | Fine Line |
| "Adore You" | 2019 | 7 | 7 | 12 | 10 | 4 | 24 | 6 | 40 | 35 | 6 | BPI: 3× Platinum; ARIA: 7× Platinum; BEA: Gold; IFPI SWI: Platinum; MC: 6× Platinum; RIAA: 5× Platinum; RMNZ: 6× Platinum | Fine Line |
| "Falling" | 2020 | 15 | 35 | — (Note: "Falling" did not enter the Ultratop 50, but peaked at number 27 on the Flemish Ultratip chart.) | 55 | 22 | — (Note: "Falling" did not enter the Dutch Single Top 100, but peaked at number nine on the Dutch Single Tip chart.) | 24 | 81 | 55 | 62 | BPI: 3× Platinum; ARIA: 4× Platinum; MC: Platinum; RIAA: 4× Platinum; RMNZ: 4× Platinum | Fine Line |
| "Watermelon Sugar" | 2020 | 4 | 5 | 2 | 3 | 2 | 4 | 4 | 9 | 3 | 1 | BPI: 5× Platinum; ARIA: 12× Platinum; BEA: Platinum; IFPI SWI: 2× Platinum; MC: Diamond; RIAA: 7× Platinum; RMNZ: 8× Platinum | Fine Line |
| "Golden" | 2020 | 26 | 39 | 37 | 45 | 23 | 55 | 40 | 74 | — | 57 | BPI: 2× Platinum; ARIA: 3× Platinum; MC: 2× Platinum; RIAA: 2× Platinum; RMNZ: 2× Platinum | Fine Line |
| "Treat People with Kindness" | 2021 | — | — | 50 | — | 73 | — (Note: "Treat People with Kindness" did not enter the Dutch Single Top 100, but peaked at number nine on the Dutch Airplay chart.) | — (Note: "Treat People with Kindness" did not enter the NZ Top 40 Singles Chart, but peaked at number eight on the NZ Hot Singles Chart.) | — | — | — (Note: "Treat People with Kindness" did not chart on the Billboard Hot 100, but peaked at number 18 on the Bubbling Under Hot 100 chart.) | BPI: Silver; RIAA: Gold; RMNZ: Gold | Fine Line |
| "Fine Line" | 2021 | — | 95 | — | — | — | — | — | — | — | — (Note: "Fine Line" did not enter the Billboard Hot 100, but peaked at number 11 on the Bubbling Under Hot 100 chart.) | BPI: Platinum; ARIA: Platinum; RIAA: Platinum; RMNZ: Platinum | Fine Line |
| "As It Was" | 2022 | 1 | 1 | 1 | 1 | 1 | 1 | 1 | 1 | 1 | 1 | BPI: 6× Platinum; ARIA: 11× Platinum; GLF: 2× Platinum; IFPI SWI: 4× Platinum; MC: 8× Platinum; RIAA: 6× Platinum; RMNZ: 8× Platinum | Harry's House |
| "Late Night Talking" | 2022 | 2 | 2 | 42 | 3 | 2 | 6 | 2 | 9 | 11 | 3 | BPI: 2× Platinum; ARIA: 3× Platinum; GLF: Gold; IFPI SWI: Gold; MC: 3× Platinum; RIAA: 3× Platinum; RMNZ: 2× Platinum | Harry's House |
| "Music for a Sushi Restaurant" | 2022 | 3 | 4 | 47 | 7 | 8 | 14 | 4 | 34 | — | 8 | BPI: Platinum; ARIA: Platinum; MC: Platinum; RIAA: Platinum; RMNZ: Platinum | Harry's House |
| "Satellite" | 2023 | 18 | 10 | — | 18 | 6 | 49 | 30 | 50 | — | 21 | BPI: Platinum; ARIA: Platinum; MC: Platinum; RIAA: Platinum; RMNZ: Platinum | Harry's House |
| "Aperture" | 2026 | 1 | 2 | 4 | 4 | 1 | 3 | 3 | 5 | 9 | 1 | BPI: Gold; RMNZ: Gold | Kiss All the Time. Disco, Occasionally. |
| "American Girls" | 2026 | 1 | 3 | 4 | 5 | 3 | 5 | 6 | 15 | 12 | 4 | BPI: Platinum; MC: Gold; RMNZ: Gold | Kiss All the Time. Disco, Occasionally. |
| "Dance No More" | 2026 | 55 | 29 | — | 32 | 93 | — (Note: "Dance No More" did not enter the Dutch Single Top 100, but peaked at number two on the Dutch Single Tip chart.) | 32 | 84 | — | 26 | BPI: Silver | Kiss All the Time. Disco, Occasionally. |
| "Coming Up Roses" | 2026 | 24 | 21 | 47 | 21 | 17 | 95 | 16 | 55 | — | 18 | BPI: Silver | Kiss All the Time. Disco, Occasionally. |
"—" denotes single that did not chart or was not released.

=== Promotional singles ===
| Title | Year | Peak chart positions | | | | | | | | Certifications | Album |
| Title | Year | UK | AUS | CAN | IRE | ITA | NZ | SWE | US | Certifications | Album |
|---|---|---|---|---|---|---|---|---|---|---|---|
| "Sweet Creature" | 2017 | 46 | 39 | 69 | 37 | 85 | 39 | 95 | 93 | BPI: Platinum; ARIA: 2× Platinum; FIMI: Platinum; GLF: Gold; MC: Platinum; RIAA: 2× Platinum; RMNZ: 2× Platinum | Harry Styles |

== Other charted and certified songs ==
| Title | Year | Peak chart positions | | | | | | | | | | Certifications | Album |
| Title | Year | UK | AUS | BEL (FL) | CAN | IRE | ITA | NZ | SWE | SWI | US | Certifications | Album |
|---|---|---|---|---|---|---|---|---|---|---|---|---|---|
| "Meet Me in the Hallway" | 2017 | 64 | — | — | 100 | 56 | — | — | — | — | — | BPI: Silver; RIAA: Gold; RMNZ: Gold | Harry Styles |
| "Carolina" | 2017 | 51 | — | — | 83 | 49 | — | — (Note: "Carolina" did not enter the NZ Top 40 Singles Chart, but peaked at number one on the NZ Heatseeker Singles Chart.) | — (Note: "Carolina" did not enter the Swedish Sverigetopplistan chart, but peaked at number eight on the Swedish Heatseeker Chart.) | — | — (Note: "Carolina" did not enter the Billboard Hot 100, but peaked at number 14 on the Bubbling Under Hot 100 chart.) | BPI: Silver; RIAA: Gold; RMNZ: Gold | Harry Styles |
| "Only Angel" | 2017 | 80 | — | — | — | 85 | — | — | — (Note: "Only Angel" did not enter the Swedish Sverigetopplistan chart, but peaked at number one on the Swedish Heatseeker Chart.) | — | — | BPI: Silver; ARIA: Gold; RIAA: Gold; RMNZ: Gold | Harry Styles |
| "Ever Since New York" | 2017 | 87 | — | — | — | 78 | — | — | — | — | — | BPI: Silver; RIAA: Gold; RMNZ: Gold | Harry Styles |
| "Woman" | 2017 | 99 | — | — | — | 87 | — | — | — | — | — | BPI: Silver; ARIA: Gold; RIAA: Gold | Harry Styles |
| "From the Dining Table" | 2017 | — | — | — | — | 91 | — | — | — | — | — | BPI: Silver; RIAA: Gold; RMNZ: Platinum | Harry Styles |
| "Girl Crush" | 2017 | — | — | — | — | — | — | — | — | — | — | BPI: Silver; ARIA: Gold; RMNZ: Gold | Spotify Singles |
| "Cherry" | 2019 | — | 52 | — | 69 | — | — | — (Note: "Cherry" did not enter the NZ Top 40 Singles Chart, but peaked at number three on the NZ Hot Singles Chart.) | — | — | 84 | BPI: Gold; ARIA: Platinum; MC: Gold; RIAA: Platinum; RMNZ: Platinum | Fine Line |
| "To Be So Lonely" | 2019 | — | 69 | — | 88 | — | — | — (Note: "To Be So Lonely" did not enter the NZ Top 40 Singles Chart, but peaked at number five on the NZ Hot Singles Chart.) | — | — | — (Note: "To Be So Lonely" did not enter the Billboard Hot 100, but peaked at number two on the Bubbling Under Hot 100 chart.) | BPI: Silver; MC: Gold; ARIA: Gold; RIAA: Gold; RMNZ: Gold | Fine Line |
| "She" | 2019 | — | 70 | — | 90 | — | — | — | — | — | 99 | BPI: Gold; ARIA: Gold; RIAA: Gold; RMNZ: Gold | Fine Line |
| "Sunflower, Vol. 6" | 2019 | — | 73 | — | 96 | — | — | — | — | — | — (Note: "Sunflower, Vol. 6" did not enter the Billboard Hot 100, but peaked at number three on the Bubbling Under Hot 100 chart.) | BPI: Silver; ARIA: Gold; MC: Gold; RIAA: Platinum; RMNZ: Platinum | Fine Line |
| "Canyon Moon" | 2019 | — | — | — | — | — | — | — | — | — | — (Note: "Canyon Moon" did not enter the Billboard Hot 100, but peaked at number 15 on the Bubbling Under Hot 100 chart.) | BPI: Silver; ARIA: Gold; RIAA: Gold; RMNZ: Gold | Fine Line |
| "Grapejuice" | 2022 | — | 9 | — | 12 | — | 93 | 40 | 48 | — | 15 | BPI: Silver; MC: Gold; RIAA: Gold; RMNZ: Gold | Harry's House |
| "Daylight" | 2022 | — | 8 | — | 10 | — | 84 | 8 | 51 | — | 13 | BPI: Gold; ARIA: Platinum; MC: Platinum; RIAA: Gold; RMNZ: Platinum | Harry's House |
| "Little Freak" | 2022 | — | 6 | — | 9 | 59 | 66 | 9 | 38 | — | 14 | BPI: Gold; ARIA: Platinum; MC: Platinum; RIAA: Gold; RMNZ: Platinum | Harry's House |
| "Matilda" | 2022 | 37 | 3 | — | 5 | 3 | 61 | 3 | 25 | 23 | 9 | BPI: Platinum; ARIA: Platinum; MC: Platinum; RIAA: Platinum; RMNZ: 2× Platinum | Harry's House |
| "Cinema" | 2022 | — | 11 | — | 16 | — | — | — | 61 | — | 22 | BPI: Gold; ARIA: Gold; MC: Gold; RIAA: Gold; RMNZ: Gold | Harry's House |
| "Daydreaming" | 2022 | — | 12 | — | 21 | — | — | — | 64 | — | 24 | BPI: Gold; ARIA: Gold; MC: Gold; RIAA: Gold; RMNZ: Gold | Harry's House |
| "Keep Driving" | 2022 | — | 14 | — | 17 | 64 | — | — | 69 | — | 25 | BPI: Gold; ARIA: Gold; MC: Gold; RIAA: Gold; RMNZ: Platinum | Harry's House |
| "Boyfriends" | 2022 | — | 15 | — | 28 | — | — | — | 44 | — | 30 | BPI: Silver; MC: Gold; RIAA: Gold; RMNZ: Gold | Harry's House |
| "Love of My Life" | 2022 | — | 13 | — | 22 | — | — | — | 56 | — | 29 | ARIA: Gold; MC: Gold; RIAA: Gold; RMNZ: Gold | Harry's House |
| "Ready, Steady, Go!" | 2026 | 5 | 13 | — | 18 | — | — | 15 | 49 | — | 15 | BPI: Silver | Kiss All the Time. Disco, Occasionally. |
| "Are You Listening Yet?" | 2026 | — | 22 | — | 26 | — | — | 19 | 62 | — | 25 | | Kiss All the Time. Disco, Occasionally. |
| "Taste Back" | 2026 | — | 12 | — | 19 | 7 | — | 14 | 56 | — | 17 | BPI: Silver | Kiss All the Time. Disco, Occasionally. |
| "The Waiting Game" | 2026 | — | 27 | — | 33 | — | — | 23 | 74 | — | 28 | | Kiss All the Time. Disco, Occasionally. |
| "Season 2 Weight Loss" | 2026 | — | 28 | — | 34 | — | — | 28 | 72 | — | 30 | | Kiss All the Time. Disco, Occasionally. |
| "Pop" | 2026 | — | 24 | — | 27 | — | — | 20 | 59 | — | 23 | | Kiss All the Time. Disco, Occasionally. |
| "Paint by Numbers" | 2026 | — | 38 | — | 42 | — | — | 39 | — (Note: "Paint by Numbers" did not enter the Swedish Sverigetopplistan chart, but peaked at number one on the Swedish Heatseeker Chart.) | — | 45 | | Kiss All the Time. Disco, Occasionally. |
| "Carla's Song" | 2026 | — | 31 | — | 37 | — | — | 35 | 89 | — | 38 | | Kiss All the Time. Disco, Occasionally. |
"—" denotes song that did not chart or was not released.

== Music videos ==
| Title | Year | Director(s) | Ref. |
|---|---|---|---|
| "Sign of the Times" | 2017 | Woodkid | |
| "Kiwi" | 2017 | Us (Chris Barett and Luke Taylor) | |
| "Lights Up" | 2019 | Vincent Haycock | |
| "Adore You" | 2019 | Dave Meyers | |
| "Falling" | 2020 | Dave Meyers | |
| "Watermelon Sugar" | 2020 | Bradley & Pablo | |
| "Golden" | 2020 | Ben Turner and Gabe Turner | |
| "Treat People with Kindness" | 2021 | Ben Turner and Gabe Turner | |
| "As It Was" | 2022 | Tanu Muino | |
| "Late Night Talking" | 2022 | Bradley & Pablo | |
| "Music for a Sushi Restaurant" | 2022 | Aube Perrie | |
| "Satellite" | 2023 | Aube Perrie | |
| "Daylight" | 2023 | Tanu Muino | |
| "Aperture" | 2026 | Aube Perrie | |
| "American Girls" | 2026 | James Mackel | |
| "Dance No More" | 2026 | Colin Solal Cardo | |
| "Coming Up Roses" | 2026 | Bradley & Pablo | |

== See also ==
- List of songs written by Harry Styles
- One Direction discography
