= List of songs written by Harry Styles =

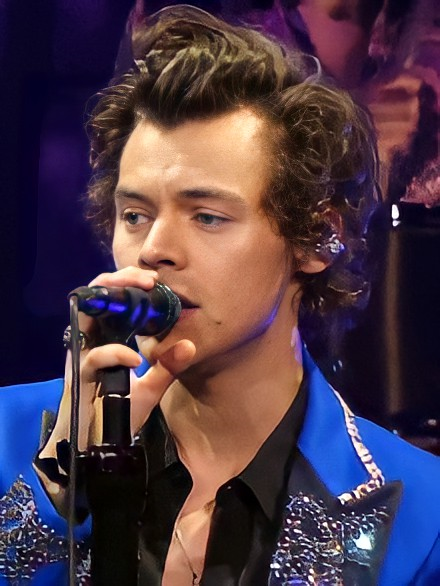
Styles performing in Nashville, Tennessee as part of Harry Styles: Live on Tour in 2018.

English singer-songwriter Harry Styles has written tracks on all three of his studio albums — Harry Styles (2017), Fine Line (2019) and Harry’s House (2022) — and for an assortment of other artists. He has majority of shares in most of his songwriting credits.

After co-writing several songs on the One Direction albums Up All Night and Take Me Home, Styles worked with Savan Kotecha and Carl Falk to write "Happily", and Gary Lightbody of Snow Patrol and Jacknife Lee to write "Something Great", both of which appeared on Midnight Memories. On this album, Styles also co-wrote the hit single "Story of My Life", which peaked at number two on the UK Singles Chart, and sold over three million copies in the US. Styles co-wrote the song "Just a Little Bit of Your Heart" with Johan Carlsson which was included on Ariana Grande's second studio album My Everything (2014). Grande went on to perform the song at the 57th Annual Grammy Awards as a then first-time nominee.

Styles also co-wrote the song "I Love You" with Carlsson which was recorded by Alex & Sierra for their debut studio album. He co-wrote several songs on Four including "Where Do Broken Hearts Go", "Stockholm Syndrome", and hit single "Night Changes". He also contributed to several songs on Made in the A.M. including the second single "Perfect", which peaked at number two on the UK Singles Chart. Styles co-wrote the song "Someday" with Meghan Trainor which was recorded by Trainor and Michael Bublé for the latter's Grammy nominated ninth studio album, Nobody but Me (2016). With Jack Antonoff and Ilsey Juber, Styles co-wrote "Alfie's Song (Not So Typical Love Song)", released as a single by Bleachers, for the soundtrack of the film Love, Simon (2018).

Styles worked with Jeff Bhasker, Mitch Rowland, Alex Salibian, Tyler Johnson, and Ryan Nasci on his first album, including the lead single "Sign of the Times", which peaked at number one on the UK Singles Chart and sold over two million copies in the US.

For his second studio album, Styles partnered with longtime friend and standout producer Thomas Hull, who also had a small role in his debut record, as well as former collaborators Johnson, Rowland, and Bhasker. The record's first single, "Lights Up", peaked at number three on the UK Singles Chart. Another Fine Line single was Styles’ first Billboard Hot 100 number one hit "Watermelon Sugar", earning him his first Grammy Award and second Brit Award. Styles and Kid Harpoon were nominated for Songwriter of the Year at the UK's prestigious Ivor Novello Awards in 2021, which celebrate the country's great songwriting and composing talents. Another Fine Line single, "Adore You", was named most performed song at the ceremony.

Aside from the aforementioned artists, Styles has written for bands Augustana and Kodaline, as well as singer Gavin DeGraw. He's collaborated with OneRepublic lead singer Ryan Tedder, EGOT recipient John Legend, and Snow Patrol pianist Johnny McDaid. Colleagues of Styles have indicated that he's composed music with Taylor Swift, Bruno Mars, and Max Martin, though no works have been registered as of yet.

== Songs ==
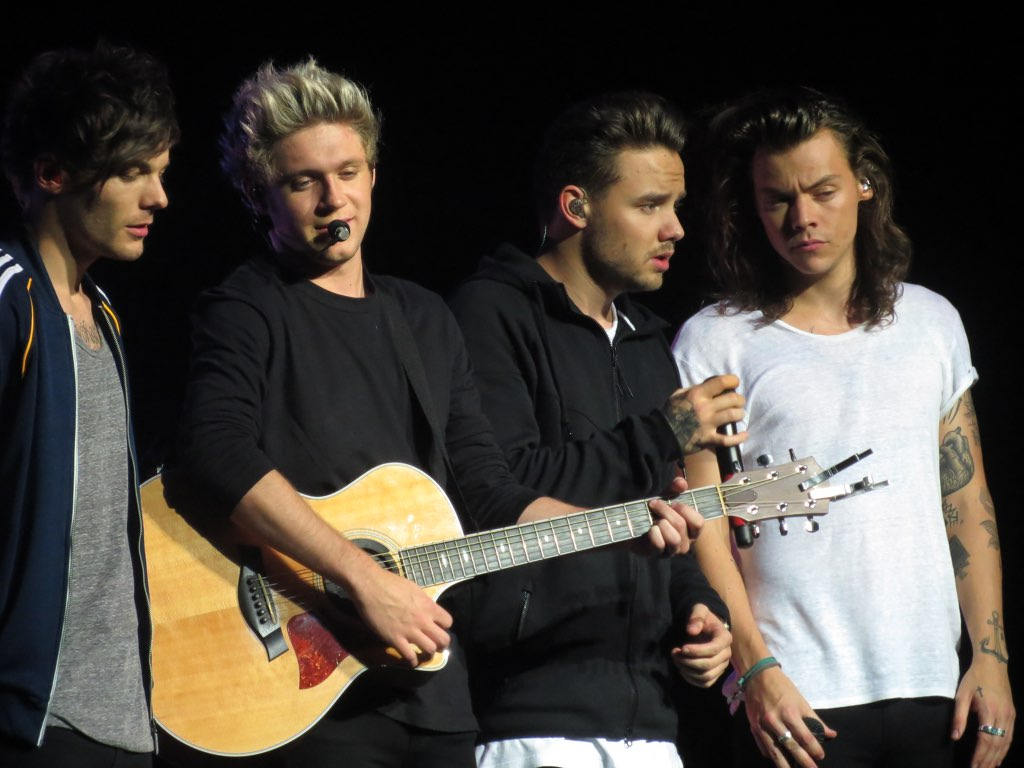
Styles has co-written numerous songs recorded by One Direction (pictured) including three singles: "Perfect", "Night Changes", and "Story of My Life".

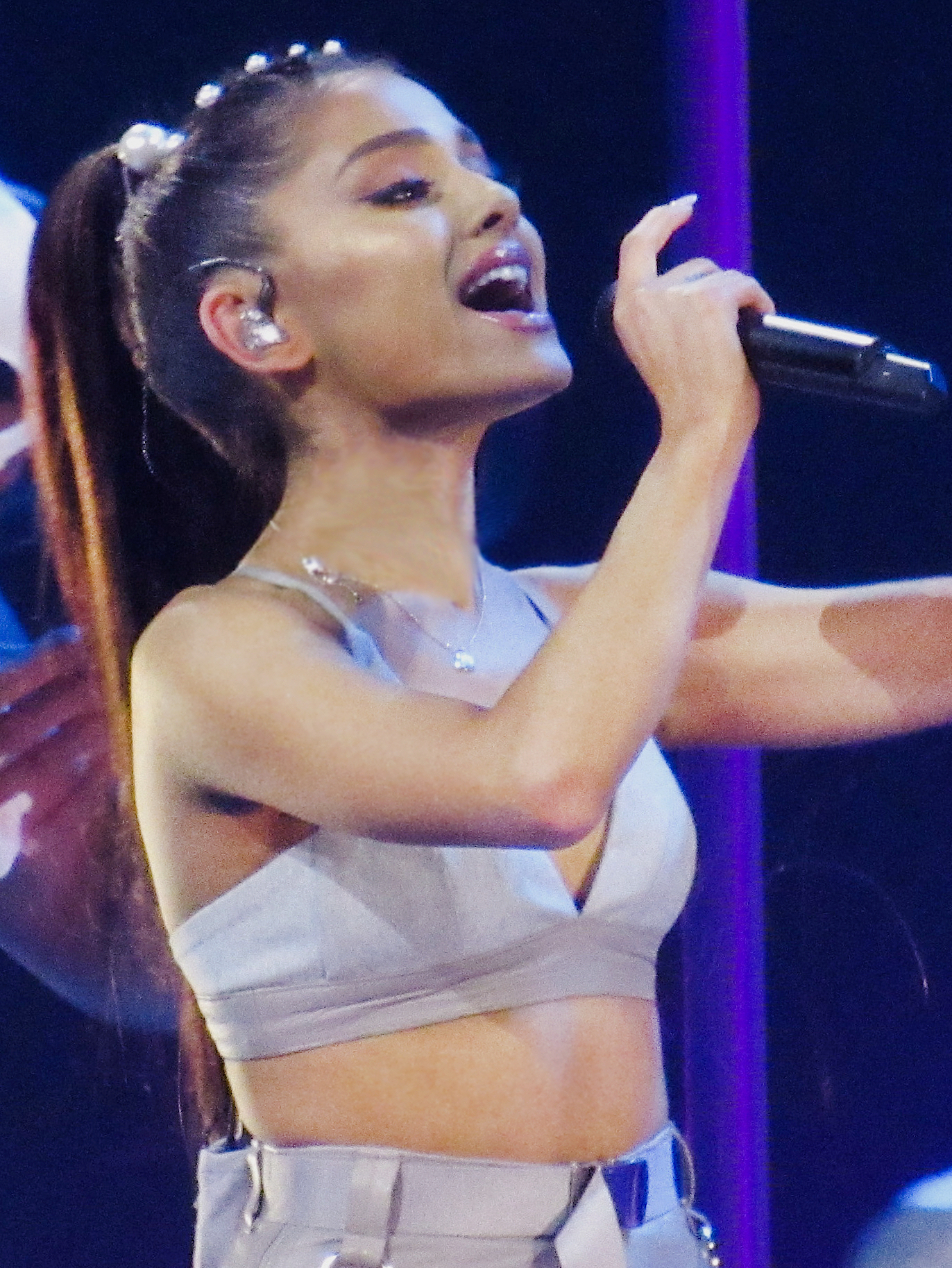
Styles co-wrote "Just a Little Bit of Your Heart" which was recorded by Ariana Grande (pictured) for her second studio album My Everything (2014).

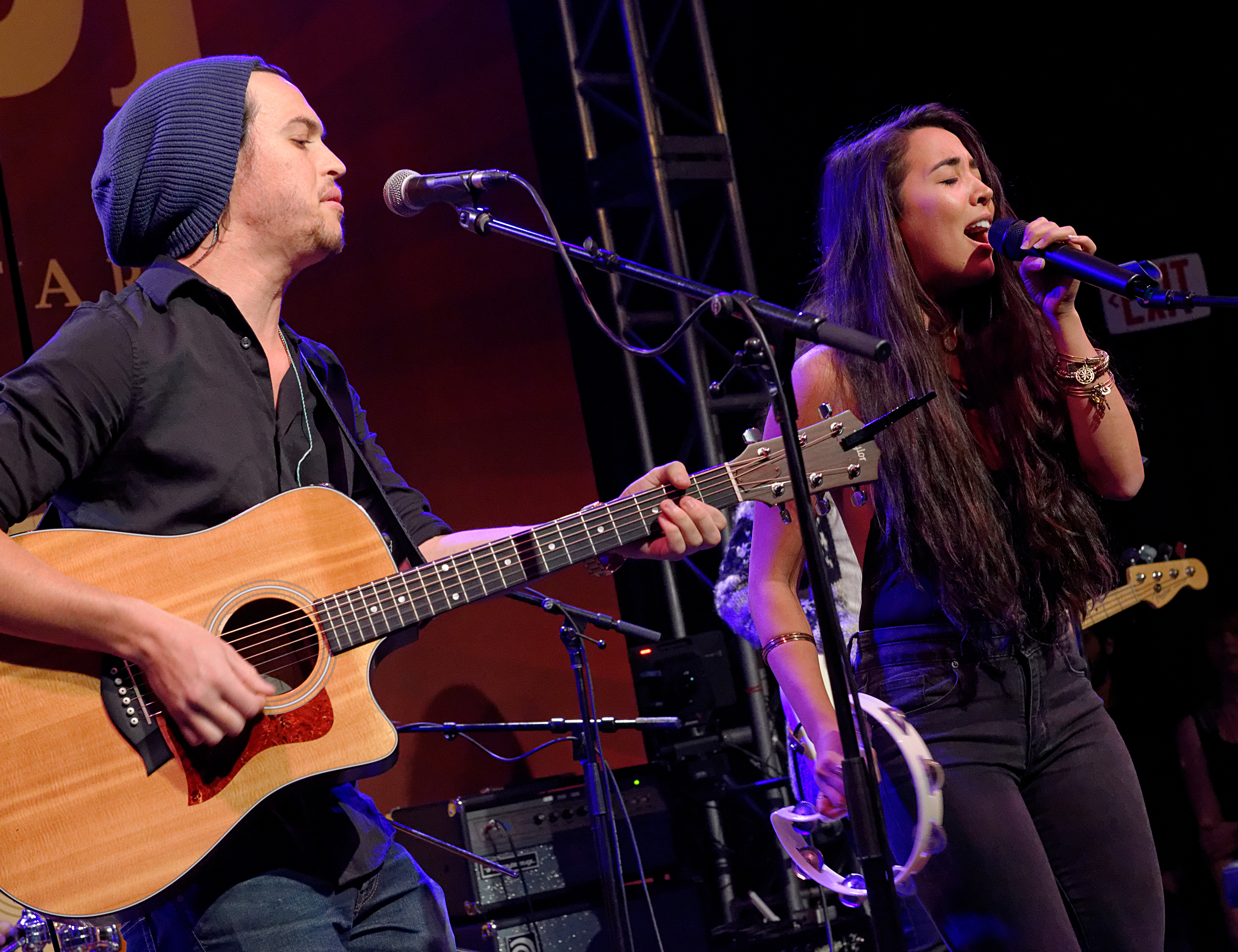
Styles co-wrote "I Love You" which was recorded by Alex & Sierra (pictured) for their debut album It's About Us (2014).

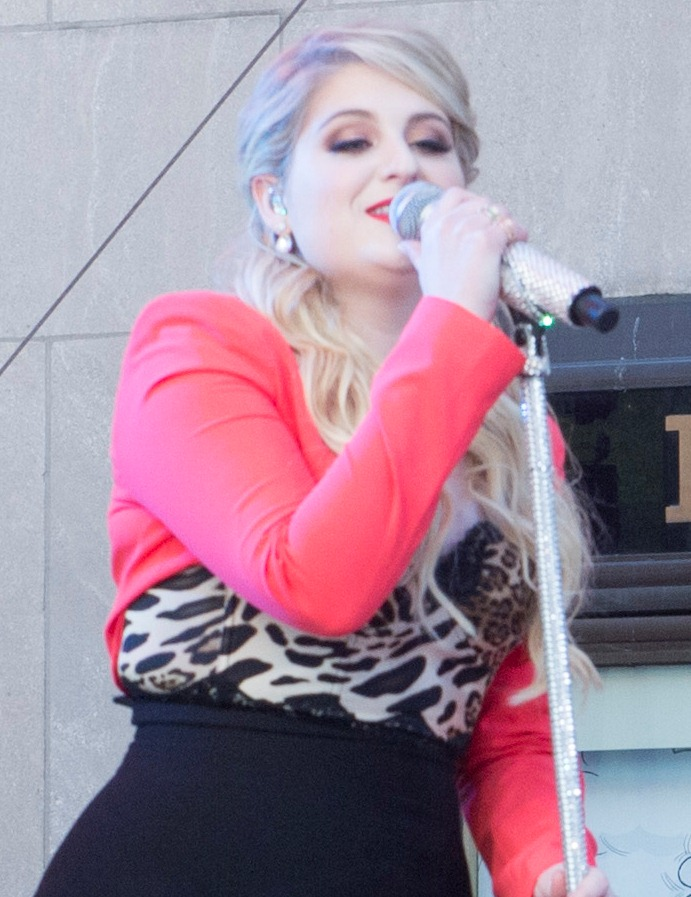
Styles co-wrote "Someday" with Meghan Trainor (pictured) which was recorded as a duet by Trainor and Michael Bublé on the album Nobody but Me (2016).

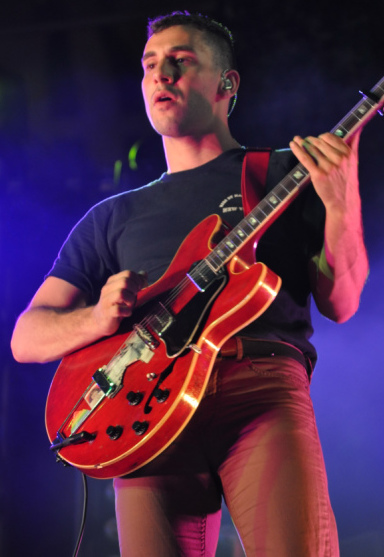
Styles co-wrote "Alfie's Song (Not So Typical Love Song)" with Jack Antonoff (pictured) for the soundtrack of Love, Simon (2018).

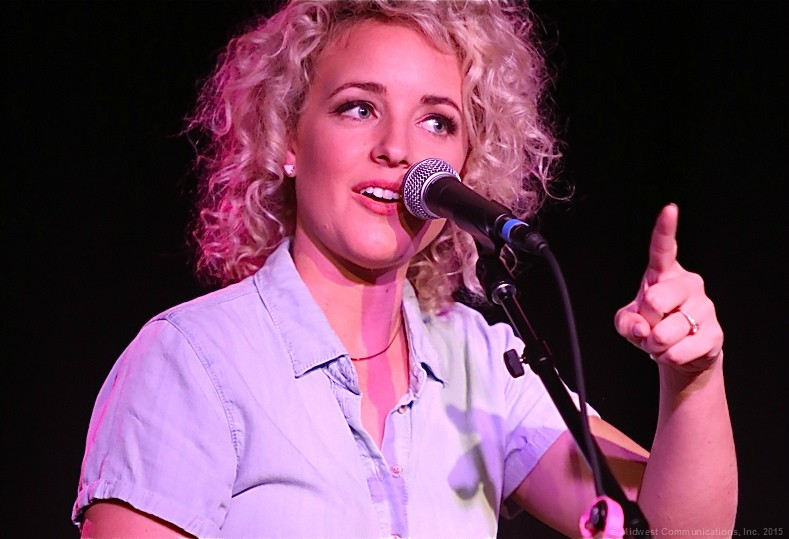
Styles co-wrote "Changes" for The Otherside, a 2020 album by country singer Cam whom he toured with in 2017.

Key
†	Indicates single release
#	Indicates promotional single release

Song	Artist(s)	Writer(s)	Album	Year	Ref.
"5378 Miles"	—N/a	Harry Styles; Gary Go; Johnny McDaid	—N/a	Unreleased	
"A.M."	One Direction	Harry Styles; Julian Bunetta; Ed Drewett; Wayne Hector; Niall Horan; Liam Payne; John Ryan; Louis Tomlinson	Made in the A.M. (Deluxe Edition)	2015	
"Adore You" †	Harry Styles	Harry Styles; Amy Allen; Thomas Hull; Tyler Johnson; Mitch Rowland	Fine Line	2019	
"Alfie's Song (Not So Typical Love Song)" †	Bleachers	Harry Styles; Jack Antonoff; Ilsey Juber	Love, Simon (Original Motion Picture Soundtrack)	2018	
"Already Home"	—N/a	Harry Styles; Gary Go; Johnny McDaid	—N/a	Unreleased	
"American Girls" †	Harry Styles	Harry Styles Thomas Hull Tyler Johnson	Kiss All the Time. Disco, Occasionally	2026	
"Anna" (Note: "Anna" and "Medicine" are two unreleased tracks written for his debut album that were included on the setlist for his tour in 2018.)	Harry Styles	Harry Styles; Tyler Johnson; Mitch Rowland; Alex Salibian	—N/a	Unreleased	
"Aperture" †	Harry Styles	Harry Styles Thomas Hull	Kiss All the Time. Disco, Occasionally	2026	
"Are You Listening Yet?"	Harry Styles	Harry Styles Tyler Johnson Thomas Hull	Kiss All the Time. Disco, Occasionally	2026	
"As It Was" †	Harry Styles	Harry Styles; Thomas Hull; Tyler Johnson	Harry's House	2022	
"Back for You"	One Direction	Harry Styles; Carl Falk; Kristoffer Fogelmark; Niall Horan; Savan Kotecha; Albin Nedler; Liam Payne; Louis Tomlinson; Rami Yacoub	Take Me Home	2012	
"Better than Being Alone"	Augustana	Harry Styles; Dan Layus	—N/a	Unreleased	
"Boyfriends"	Harry Styles	Harry Styles; Thomas Hull; Tyler Johnson Tobias Jesso Jr.	Harry's House	2022	
"California"	—N/a	Harry Styles; Dan Layus	—N/a	Unreleased	
"Canyon Moon"	Harry Styles	Harry Styles; Thomas Hull; Mitch Rowland	Fine Line	2019	
"Can't Get Enough"	—N/a	Harry Styles; Dan Layus	—N/a	Unreleased	
"Carla's Song"	Harry Styles	Harry Styles Thomas Hull	Kiss All the Time. Disco, Occasionally	2026	
"Carolina"	Harry Styles	Harry Styles; Jeff Bhasker; Thomas Hull; Tyler Johnson; Ryan Nasci; Mitch Rowland; Alex Salibian	Harry Styles	2017	
"Change Your Ticket"	One Direction	Harry Styles; Julian Bunetta; Niall Horan; Zayn Malik; Sam Martin; Liam Payne; John Ryan; Louis Tomlinson	Four (The Ultimate Edition)	2014	
"Changes"	Cam	Harry Styles; Lori McKenna; Tom Hull; Tyler Johnson	The Otherside	2020	
"Cherry"	Harry Styles	Harry Styles; Jeff Bhasker; Thomas Hull; Tyler Johnson; Sammy Witte	Fine Line	2019	
"Cinema"	Harry Styles	Harry Styles; Samuel Witte	Harry's House	2022	
"Coco"	—N/a	Harry Styles; Gary Go; Johnny McDaid	—N/a	Unreleased	
"Coming Up Roses"	Harry Styles	Harry Styles	Kiss All the Time. Disco, Occasionally	2026	
"Dance No More"	Harry Styles	Harry Styles Thomas Hull	Kiss All the Time. Disco, Occasionally	2026	
"Daydreaming"	Harry Styles	Harry Styles; Thomas Hull; Tyler Johnson; Quincy Jones; Louis Johnson; Alex Weir; Tom Bahler; Valerie Johnson	Harry's House	2022	
"Daylight"	Harry Styles	Harry Styles; Thomas Hull; Tyler Johnson	Harry's House	2022	
"Don't Forget to Remember Me"	—N/a	Harry Styles; Toby Gad; Niall Horan; Zayn Malik; Liam Payne; Lindy Robbins; Louis Tomlinson	—N/a	Unreleased	
"Don't Let Me Go"	Harry Styles	Harry Styles; Sam McCarthy; Dan McDougal	—N/a	Unreleased	
"Endlessly"	—N/a	Harry Styles; Gary Go; Johnny McDaid	—N/a	Unreleased	
"Ever Since New York"	Harry Styles	Harry Styles; Jeff Bhasker; Tyler Johnson; Ryan Nasci; Mitch Rowland; Alex Salibian	Harry Styles	2017	
"Everything About You"	One Direction	Harry Styles; Wayne Hector; Niall Horan; Zayn Malik; Liam Payne; Steve Robson; Louis Tomlinson	Up All Night	2011	
"Fall Apart"	—N/a	Harry Styles; Dan Layus	—N/a	Unreleased	
"Falling" †	Harry Styles	Harry Styles; Thomas Hull	Fine Line	2019	
"Fine Line" †	Harry Styles	Harry Styles; Jeff Bhasker; Thomas Hull; Tyler Johnson; Sammy Witte	Fine Line	2019	
"Fool's Gold" #	One Direction	Harry Styles; Niall Horan; Zayn Malik; Maureen McDonald; Liam Payne; Jamie Scott; Louis Tomlinson	Four	2014	
"From the Dining Table"	Harry Styles	Harry Styles; Jeff Bhasker; Tyler Johnson; Ryan Nasci; Mitch Rowland; Alex Salibian	Harry Styles	2017	
"Fun for Now"	—N/a	Harry Styles; Julian Bunetta; Dan Layus	—N/a	Unreleased	
"Golden" †	Harry Styles	Harry Styles; Thomas Hull; Tyler Johnson; Mitch Rowland	Fine Line	2019	
"Grapejuice"	Harry Styles	Harry Styles; Thomas Hull; Tyler Johnson	Harry's House	2022	
"Happily"	One Direction	Harry Styles; Savan Kotecha; Carl Falk	Midnight Memories	2013	
"Have and Hold"	—N/a	Harry Styles; Dan Layus	—N/a	Unreleased	
"I Just Wanna Be Your Man"	—N/a	Harry Styles; Dan Layus	—N/a	Unreleased	
"I Love You"	Alex & Sierra	Harry Styles; Johan Carlsson	It's About Us	2014	
"I Wasn't Ready"	—N/a	Harry Styles; John Legend	—N/a	Unreleased	
"If I Could Fly"	One Direction	Harry Styles; Johan Carlsson; Ross Golan	Made in the A.M.	2015	
"Irresistible"	One Direction	Harry Styles; Tom Fletcher; Niall Horan; Danny Jones; Zayn Malik; Liam Payne; Dougie Poynter; Louis Tomlinson	Take Me Home (Target Deluxe Edition)	2012	
"Just a Little Bit of Your Heart"	Ariana Grande	Harry Styles; Johan Carlsson	My Everything	2014	
"Keep Driving"	Harry Styles	Harry Styles; Thomas Hull; Tyler Johnson; Mitch Rowland	Harry's House	2022	
"Kiss It Better"	—N/a	Harry Styles; Dan Layus	—N/a	Unreleased	
"Kiss Me"	—N/a	Harry Styles; Dan Layus	—N/a	Unreleased	
"Kissed You in the Rain"	—N/a	Harry Styles; Dan Layus	—N/a	Unreleased	
"Kiwi" †	Harry Styles	Harry Styles; Jeff Bhasker; Tyler Johnson; Ryan Nasci; Mitch Rowland; Alex Salibian	Harry Styles	2017	
"Late Night Talking"	Harry Styles	Harry Styles; Thomas Hull	Harry's House	2022	
"Lay Down"	—N/a	Harry Styles; Thomas Atkin; Jake Gosling; Chris Leonard	—N/a	Unreleased	
"Lights Up" †	Harry Styles	Harry Styles; Thomas Hull; Tyler Johnson	Fine Line	2019	
"Like Everybody Else"	—N/a	Harry Styles; Dan Layus	—N/a	Unreleased	
"Like You Do"	—N/a	Harry Styles; Dan Layus	—N/a	Unreleased	
"Little Freak"	Harry Styles	Harry Styles; Thomas Hull	Harry's House	2022	
"Long Time Gone"	—N/a	Harry Styles; Gary Lightbody; Johnny McDaid	—N/a	Unreleased	
"Love of My Life"	Harry Styles	Harry Styles; Thomas Hull; Tyler Johnson	Harry's House	2022	
"Love You Like You're Leaving"	—N/a	Harry Styles; Dan Layus	—N/a	Unreleased	
"Make It Feel Right"	—N/a	Harry Styles; Steve Garrigan; Vincent May; Mark Prendergast	—N/a	Unreleased	
"Matilda"	Harry Styles	Harry Styles; Thomas Hull; Tyler Johnson; Amy Allen	Harry's House	2022	
"Medicine"	—N/a	Harry Styles; Tyler Johnson; Mitch Rowland; Alex Salibian	—N/a	Unreleased	
"Meet Me in the Hallway"	Harry Styles	Harry Styles; Jeff Bhasker; Tyler Johnson; Ryan Nasci; Mitch Rowland; Alex Salibian	Harry Styles	2017	
"Might Not Want You"	—N/a	Harry Styles; Dan Layus	—N/a	Unreleased	
"Music for a Sushi Restaurant"	Harry Styles	Harry Styles; Thomas Hull; Tyler Johnson; Mitch Rowland	Harry's House	2022	
"Night Changes" †	One Direction	Harry Styles; Julian Bunetta; Niall Horan; Zayn Malik; John Ryan; Jamie Scott; Liam Payne; Louis Tomlinson	Four	2014	
"Not Our Fault"	Gavin DeGraw	Harry Styles; Gavin DeGraw; Jake Gosling; Chris Leonard	—N/a	Unreleased	
"Olivia"	One Direction	Harry Styles; Julian Bunetta; John Ryan	Made in the A.M.	2015	
"One Desire"	—N/a	Harry Styles; Dan Layus	—N/a	Unreleased	
"One of Those Nights"	—N/a	Harry Styles; Dan Layus	—N/a	Unreleased	
"Only Angel"	Harry Styles	Harry Styles; Jeff Bhasker; Tyler Johnson; Ryan Nasci; Mitch Rowland; Alex Salibian	Harry Styles	2017	
"Paint By Numbers"	Harry Styles	Harry Styles Tyler Johnson Thomas Hull	Kiss All the Time. Disco, Occasionally	2026	
"Perfect" †	One Direction	Harry Styles; Julian Bunetta; Jacob Kasher; Maureen McDonald; John Ryan; Jesse Shatkin; Louis Tomlinson	Made in the A.M.	2015	
"Pop"	Harry Styles	Harry Styles Tyler Johnson Thomas Hull	Kiss All the Time. Disco, Occasionally	2026	
"Ready, Steady, Go!"	Harry Styles	Harry Styles Tyler Johnson Thomas Hull	Kiss All the Time. Disco, Occasionally	2026	
"Right Now"	One Direction	Harry Styles; Liam Payne; Ryan Tedder; Louis Tomlinson	Midnight Memories	2013	
"Same Mistakes"	One Direction	Harry Styles; Wayne Hector; Niall Horan; Zayn Malik; Liam Payne; Steve Robson; Louis Tomlinson	Up All Night	2011	
"Satellite" †	Harry Styles	Harry Styles; Thomas Hull; Tyler Johnson	Harry's House	2022	
"Season 2 Weight Loss"	Harry Styles	Harry Styles Thomas Hull Tyler Johnson	Kiss All the Time. Disco, Occasionally	2026	
"Second Chance"	—N/a	Harry Styles; Dan Layus	—N/a	Unreleased	
"She"	Harry Styles	Harry Styles; Jeff Bhasker; Thomas Hull; Mitch Rowland	Fine Line	2019	
"She Got Away"	One Direction	Harry Styles; Ryan Tedder; Noel Zancanella	—N/a	Unreleased	
"Sign of the Times" †	Harry Styles	Harry Styles; Jeff Bhasker; Tyler Johnson; Ryan Nasci; Mitch Rowland; Alex Salibian	Harry Styles	2017	
"Someday"	Michael Bublé (featuring Meghan Trainor)	Harry Styles; Johan Carlsson; Meghan Trainor	Nobody but Me	2016	
"Something Great"	One Direction	Harry Styles; Jacknife Lee; Gary Lightbody	Midnight Memories	2013	
"Something I've Been Waiting For"	—N/a	Harry Styles; Gary Lightbody; Johnny McDaid	—N/a	Unreleased	
"Still the One"	One Direction	Harry Styles; Carl Falk; Savan Kotecha; Liam Payne; Louis Tomlinson; Rami Yacoub	Take Me Home (Yearbook Edition)	2012	
"Stockholm Syndrome"	One Direction	Harry Styles; Julian Bunetta; Johan Carlsson; John Ryan	Four	2014	
"Story of My Life" †	One Direction	Harry Styles; Julian Bunetta; Niall Horan; Zayn Malik; Liam Payne; John Ryan; Jamie Scott; Louis Tomlinson	Midnight Memories	2013	
"Summer Love"	One Direction	Harry Styles; Wayne Hector; Niall Horan; Zayn Malik; Liam Payne; Lindy Robbins; Steve Robson; Louis Tomlinson	Take Me Home	2012	
"Sunflower, Vol. 6"	Harry Styles	Harry Styles; Thomas Hull; Greg Kurstin	Fine Line	2019	
"Sweet Creature" #	Harry Styles	Harry Styles; Thomas Hull	Harry Styles	2017	
"Taken"	One Direction	Harry Styles; Toby Gad; Niall Horan; Zayn Malik; Liam Payne; Lindy Robbins; Louis Tomlinson	Up All Night	2011	
"Taste Back"	Harry Styles	Harry Styles Tyler Johnson Thomas Hull	Kiss All the Time. Disco, Occasionally	2026	
"The Waiting Game"	Harry Styles	Harry Styles Tyler Johnson Thomas Hull	Kiss All the Time. Disco, Occasionally	2026	
"This Is the Start"	—N/a	Harry Styles; Johnny McDaid	—N/a	Unreleased	
"To Be So Lonely"	Harry Styles	Harry Styles; Thomas Hull; Tyler Johnson; Mitch Rowland	Fine Line	2019	
"Treat People with Kindness" †	Harry Styles	Harry Styles; Jeff Bhasker; Ilsey Juber	Fine Line	2019	
"Two Ghosts" †	Harry Styles	Harry Styles; Julian Bunetta; Tyler Johnson; Mitch Rowland; John Ryan	Harry Styles	2017	
"Wake Up the Sun"	—N/a	Harry Styles; Gary Lightbody; Johnny McDaid	—N/a	Unreleased	
"Walking in the Wind"	One Direction	Harry Styles; Julian Bunetta; John Ryan; Jamie Scott	Made in the A.M. (Deluxe Edition)	2015	
"Want You to Be There"	One Direction	Harry Styles; Jake Gosling; Chris Leonard	—N/a	Unreleased	
"Watermelon Sugar" †	Harry Styles	Harry Styles; Thomas Hull; Tyler Johnson; Mitch Rowland	Fine Line	2019	
"Where Do Broken Hearts Go" #	One Direction	Harry Styles; Julian Bunetta; Ruth-Anne Cunningham; Teddy Geiger; Ali Tamposi	Four	2014	
"Woman"	Harry Styles	Harry Styles; Jeff Bhasker; Tyler Johnson; Ryan Nasci; Mitch Rowland; Alex Salibian	Harry Styles	2017	
"You Still Have My Heart (Even If You Don't Deserve It)"	—N/a	Harry Styles; Dan Layus	—N/a	Unreleased	
