= Together, Together =

2026–2027 concert tour by Harry Styles

- Tour by Harry Styles
- Promotional poster for 2026 concerts
- Location: Australia; Europe; North America; South America
- Associated album: Kiss All the Time. Disco, Occasionally.
- Start date: 16 May 2026
- End date: 28 August 2027
- No. of shows: 108
- Supporting acts: Baby J; Baby Rose; Ca7riel & Paco Amoroso; Fcukers; Feist; Fousheé; Getdown Services; Jamie xx; LCD Soundsystem; Kylie Minogue; Skye Newman; Caroline Polachek; Q Marsden; Robyn; Jorja Smith; Tears for Fears; Tinashe; Shania Twain; Lainey Wilson; the Womack Sisters

Harry Styles concert chronology
- Love On Tour (2021–2023); Together, Together (2026–2027)

Together, Together is the third concert tour by the English singer and songwriter Harry Styles, in support of his fourth studio album, Kiss All the Time. Disco, Occasionally. (2026). It commenced on 16 May 2026 at Johan Cruyff Arena in Amsterdam, the Netherlands, and will conclude on 28 August 2027 at Wembley Stadium in London, United Kingdom. Featuring 108 shows across eighteen cities, the tour includes a 30-night residency at Madison Square Garden in New York City, United States.

== Background ==
On 27 December 2025, Harry Styles uploaded an eight-minute video to his YouTube channel titled "Forever, Forever", including footage from the final show of his Love On Tour, in Reggio Emilia, where he had performed the unreleased instrumental. On 15 January 2026, he announced his fourth studio album, Kiss All the Time. Disco, Occasionally. (2026), with its lead single, "Aperture", released 22 January. Ahead of the song's release, Styles announced the tour, with a line up of fifty concerts in seven cities across four continents, including a 30-date residency at New York City's Madison Square Garden. Fcukers, Fousheé, Jamie xx, Skye Newman, Robyn, Jorja Smith, and Shania Twain were also announced as the opening acts for a specific city, with Baby J serving as co-supporting act for the Australian dates.

Supplemental concerts were announced due to demand in Amsterdam, London, São Paulo, Mexico City, and Melbourne, respectively. In May 2026, a supplemental concert in Melbourne, Australia, was announced. Styles' concert scheduled for 21 July 2026 was cancelled due to a health issue. In response, Live Nation announced that they were collaborating with the venue—Estádio do MorumBIS—to make additional tickets available for the show on 24 July. Ticket holders from the cancelled date would have the opportunity to purchase these tickets at a discounted price.

On 9 September 2026, Styles announced concerts for the following year would be revealed in the next day, referring to them as the "final cities". On 10 September, 25 concerts were announced, scheduled to take place from April to August 2027. Supplemental concerts were subsequently announced for select cities.

== Critical reception ==
The New York Times' Leah Greenblatt described Madison Square Garden as "Harry's House" with Styles' first night of his 30 concert residency at the venue. She further noted his ability to play "shamelessly to the locals". Paolo Ragusa of Consequence described reception as "rapturous" and believed the highlight of the evening involved "higher stakes". Variety editor Karla Cote noted Styles' revamp of the concert's set list and praised the production's transition from stadiums to the arena. The Hollywood Reporter's Lexi Carson echoed Greenblatt's description of the venue being transitioned into "Harry's House".

== Commercial performance ==
=== Ticket sales ===
On 26 January 2026, the presale for tickets began. Fans expressed their frustration regarding high prices during the sale. Individuals also received a message indicating that their wait time for tickets could exceed an hour. According to Ticketmaster, a record-breaking 11.5 million individuals registered for a presale code to gain access to the concerts at Madison Square Garden.

== Spin-off media ==
In October 2026, a concert documentary by filmmaker John Wilson, Universal Pictures Content Group, Peanut World Pictures and Styles was announced. Filming for the project commenced in August of the same year, focusing on Styles' 30-night residency at Madison Square Garden, and will feature a mixture of live performance and behind-the-scenes footage, poised to give an insight into "Styles' world".

== Philanthropy ==
With the announcement of the tour, Styles announced that he would be donating £1 from every ticket sold from his UK itinerary to small music venues around the country, in partnership with LIVE Trust. Other nonprofit partnerships include Choose Love and New York-based HeadCount.

== Set list ==
=== May to August 2026 ===
This set list is from the concert in Amsterdam on 16 May 2026. It may not represent all concerts for the duration of the tour.

1. "Are You Listening Yet?"
2. "Golden"
3. "Adore You"
4. "Watermelon Sugar"
5. "Music for a Sushi Restaurant"
6. "Taste Back"
7. "Coming Up Roses"
8. "Fine Line"
9. "American Girls"
10. "Keep Driving"
11. "Ready, Steady, Go!"
12. "Dance No More"
13. "Treat People with Kindness"
14. "Pop"
15. "Season 2 Weight Loss"
16. "Carla's Song"
17. "Aperture"
18. "Matilda"
19. "Sign of the Times"
20. "As It Was"

==== Alterations ====
- During the 20 May, 23 May and 30 May 2026 concerts in Amsterdam, and the 17 June, 20 June and 26 June 2026 concerts in London, and the 24 July 2026 concert in São Paulo, "Love of My Life" was performed in replacement of "Matilda".
- During the 22 May and 26 May 2026 concerts in Amsterdam, "Paint by Numbers" was performed in replacement of "Matilda".
- During the 4 June 2026 concert in Amsterdam, the 1 July 2026 concert in London and the 18 July 2026 concert in São Paulo, "The Waiting Game" was performed in replacement of "Matilda".
- During the 5 June 2026 concert in Amsterdam and the 27 June 2026 concert in London, "Cherry" was performed in replacement of "Matilda".
- During the 12 June and 29 June 2026 concerts in London, and the 24 July 2026 concert in São Paulo, "Little Freak" was performed in replacement of "Matilda".
- During the 3 July 2026 concert in London, "Boyfriends" was performed in replacement of "Matilda".
- During the 4 July 2026 concert in London, "Sweet Creature" was performed in replacement of "Matilda".

=== Since August 2026 ===
This set list is from the concert in New York City on 26 August 2026. It may not represent all concerts for the duration of the tour.

1. "Dance No More"
2. "Carolina"
3. "Music for a Sushi Restaurant"
4. "Cinema"
5. "Adore You"
6. "Watermelon Sugar"
7. "Taste Back"
8. "Sweet Creature"
9. "The Waiting Game"
10. "Satellite"
11. "Are You Listening Yet?"
12. "Ready, Steady, Go!"
13. "Pop"
14. "Season 2 Weight Loss"
15. "Kiwi"
16. "American Girls"
17. "As It Was"
18. "Carla's Song"
19. "Coming Up Roses"

Encore

20. "Sign of the Times"
21. "Aperture"

=== Alterations ===
- During the 16 October 2026 concert in New York City, Styles performed a new song written in tribute to Liam Payne.
- During the 30 October 2026 concert in New York City, Styles performed "Isn't She Lovely" (1976) by Stevie Wonder.

==== Notes ====
- During the 26 August 2026 concert in New York City, a recording of Dolly Parton's "I Will Always Love You" (1974) was played, following Parton's death the day prior, as part of the encore.
- Beginning with the concerts in New York City, an alternate edit of "Kiwi" was performed, interpolating "Daft Punk Is Playing at My House" (2005) by LCD Soundsystem.

== Shows ==
List of 2026 concerts
Date (2026)	City	Country	Venue	Supporting acts	Attendance	Revenue
16 May	Amsterdam	Netherlands	Johan Cruyff Arena	Robyn	—	—
17 May	Amsterdam	Netherlands	Johan Cruyff Arena	Robyn	—	—
20 May	Amsterdam	Netherlands	Johan Cruyff Arena	Robyn	—	—
22 May	Amsterdam	Netherlands	Johan Cruyff Arena	Robyn	—	—
23 May	Amsterdam	Netherlands	Johan Cruyff Arena	Robyn	—	—
26 May	Amsterdam	Netherlands	Johan Cruyff Arena	Robyn	—	—
29 May	Amsterdam	Netherlands	Johan Cruyff Arena	Robyn	—	—
30 May	Amsterdam	Netherlands	Johan Cruyff Arena	Robyn	—	—
4 June	Amsterdam	Netherlands	Johan Cruyff Arena	Robyn	—	—
5 June	Amsterdam	Netherlands	Johan Cruyff Arena	Robyn	—	—
12 June	London	England	Wembley Stadium	Shania Twain	—	—
13 June	London	England	Wembley Stadium	Shania Twain	—	—
17 June	London	England	Wembley Stadium	Shania Twain	—	—
19 June	London	England	Wembley Stadium	Shania Twain	—	—
20 June	London	England	Wembley Stadium	Shania Twain	—	—
23 June	London	England	Wembley Stadium	Shania Twain	—	—
26 June	London	England	Wembley Stadium	Shania Twain	—	—
27 June	London	England	Wembley Stadium	Shania Twain	—	—
29 June	London	England	Wembley Stadium	Shania Twain	—	—
1 July	London	England	Wembley Stadium	Shania Twain	—	—
3 July	London	England	Wembley Stadium	Shania Twain	—	—
4 July	London	England	Wembley Stadium	Shania Twain	—	—
17 July	São Paulo	Brazil	Estádio do MorumBIS	Fcukers	—	—
18 July	São Paulo	Brazil	Estádio do MorumBIS	Fcukers	—	—
24 July	São Paulo	Brazil	Estádio do MorumBIS	Fcukers	—	—
31 July	Mexico City	Mexico	Estadio GNP Seguros	Jorja Smith	—	—
1 August	Mexico City	Mexico	Estadio GNP Seguros	Jorja Smith	—	—
4 August	Mexico City	Mexico	Estadio GNP Seguros	Jorja Smith	—	—
7 August	Mexico City	Mexico	Estadio GNP Seguros	Jorja Smith	—	—
8 August	Mexico City	Mexico	Estadio GNP Seguros	Jorja Smith	—	—
10 August	Mexico City	Mexico	Estadio GNP Seguros	Jorja Smith	—	—
26 August	New York City	United States	Madison Square Garden	Jamie xx	—	—
28 August	New York City	United States	Madison Square Garden	Jamie xx	—	—
29 August	New York City	United States	Madison Square Garden	Jamie xx	—	—
2 September	New York City	United States	Madison Square Garden	Jamie xx	—	—
4 September	New York City	United States	Madison Square Garden	Jamie xx	—	—
5 September	New York City	United States	Madison Square Garden	Jamie xx	—	—
9 September	New York City	United States	Madison Square Garden	Jamie xx	—	—
11 September	New York City	United States	Madison Square Garden	Jamie xx	—	—
12 September	New York City	United States	Madison Square Garden	Jamie xx	—	—
16 September	New York City	United States	Madison Square Garden	Jamie xx	—	—
18 September	New York City	United States	Madison Square Garden	Jamie xx	—	—
19 September	New York City	United States	Madison Square Garden	Jamie xx	—	—
23 September	New York City	United States	Madison Square Garden	Jamie xx	—	—
25 September	New York City	United States	Madison Square Garden	Jamie xx	—	—
26 September	New York City	United States	Madison Square Garden	Jamie xx	—	—
30 September	New York City	United States	Madison Square Garden	Jamie xx	—	—
2 October	New York City	United States	Madison Square Garden	Jamie xx	—	—
3 October	New York City	United States	Madison Square Garden	Jamie xx	—	—
7 October	New York City	United States	Madison Square Garden	Jamie xx	—	—
9 October	New York City	United States	Madison Square Garden	Jamie xx	—	—
10 October	New York City	United States	Madison Square Garden	Jamie xx	—	—
14 October	New York City	United States	Madison Square Garden	Jamie xx	—	—
16 October	New York City	United States	Madison Square Garden	Jamie xx	—	—
17 October	New York City	United States	Madison Square Garden	Jamie xx	—	—
21 October	New York City	United States	Madison Square Garden	Jamie xx	—	—
23 October	New York City	United States	Madison Square Garden	Jamie xx	—	—
24 October	New York City	United States	Madison Square Garden	Jamie xx	—	—
28 October	New York City	United States	Madison Square Garden	Jamie xx	—	—
30 October	New York City	United States	Madison Square Garden	Jamie xx	—	—
31 October	New York City	United States	Madison Square Garden	Jamie xx	—	—
27 November	Melbourne	Australia	Marvel Stadium	Baby J Fousheé	—	—
28 November	Melbourne	Australia	Marvel Stadium	Baby J Fousheé	—	—
2 December	Melbourne	Australia	Marvel Stadium	Baby J Fousheé	—	—
4 December	Melbourne	Australia	Marvel Stadium	Baby J Fousheé	—	—
12 December	Sydney	Australia	Accor Stadium	Baby J Skye Newman	—	—
13 December	Sydney	Australia	Accor Stadium	Baby J Skye Newman	—	—

List of 2027 concerts
Date (2027)	City	Country	Venue	Supporting acts	Attendance	Revenue
2 April	Glendale (Note: Labelled as Phoenix in promtional material.)	United States	State Farm Stadium	Tinashe	—	—
3 April	Glendale	United States	State Farm Stadium	Tinashe	—	—
9 April	Arlington (Note: Labelled as Dallas in promotional material.)	United States	AT&T Stadium	Ca7riel & Paco Amoroso	—	—
10 April	Arlington	United States	AT&T Stadium	Ca7riel & Paco Amoroso	—	—
14 April	Arlington	United States	AT&T Stadium	Ca7riel & Paco Amoroso	—	—
16 April	Arlington	United States	AT&T Stadium	Ca7riel & Paco Amoroso	—	—
17 April	Arlington	United States	AT&T Stadium	Ca7riel & Paco Amoroso	—	—
23 April	Pasadena (Note: Labelled as Los Angeles in promotional material.)	United States	Rose Bowl	Kylie Minogue	—	—
24 April	Pasadena	United States	Rose Bowl	Kylie Minogue	—	—
30 April	Pasadena	United States	Rose Bowl	Kylie Minogue	—	—
1 May	Pasadena	United States	Rose Bowl	Kylie Minogue	—	—
7 May	Toronto	Canada	Rogers Stadium	Lainey Wilson	—	—
8 May	Toronto	Canada	Rogers Stadium	Lainey Wilson	—	—
14 May	Toronto	Canada	Rogers Stadium	Lainey Wilson	—	—
15 May	Toronto	Canada	Rogers Stadium	Lainey Wilson	—	—
21 May	Atlanta	United States	Mercedes-Benz Stadium	Q Marsden	—	—
22 May	Atlanta	United States	Mercedes-Benz Stadium	Q Marsden	—	—
28 May	Chicago	United States	Soldier Field	The Womack Sisters	—	—
29 May	Chicago	United States	Soldier Field	The Womack Sisters	—	—
31 May	Chicago	United States	Soldier Field	The Womack Sisters	—	—
4 June	Chicago	United States	Soldier Field	The Womack Sisters	—	—
5 June	Chicago	United States	Soldier Field	The Womack Sisters	—	—
2 July	Berlin	Germany	Flughafen Tempelhof	Getdown Services	—	—
3 July	Berlin	Germany	Flughafen Tempelhof	Getdown Services	—	—
9 July	Berlin	Germany	Flughafen Tempelhof	Getdown Services	—	—
10 July	Berlin	Germany	Flughafen Tempelhof	Getdown Services	—	—
16 July	Nanterre (Note: Labelled as Paris in promotional material.)	France	Plenitude Arena	Caroline Polachek	—	—
17 July	Nanterre	France	Plenitude Arena	Caroline Polachek	—	—
23 July	Nanterre	France	Plenitude Arena	Caroline Polachek	—	—
24 July	Nanterre	France	Plenitude Arena	Caroline Polachek	—	—
30 July	Madrid	Spain	Riyadh Air Metropolitano	Feist	—	—
31 July	Madrid	Spain	Riyadh Air Metropolitano	Feist	—	—
2 August	Madrid	Spain	Riyadh Air Metropolitano	Feist	—	—
7 August	Rome	Italy	Circo Massimo	LCD Soundsystem	—	—
8 August	Rome	Italy	Circo Massimo	LCD Soundsystem	—	—
18 August	Dublin	Ireland	Croke Park	Baby Rose	—	—
20 August	Dublin	Ireland	Croke Park	Baby Rose	—	—
21 August	Dublin	Ireland	Croke Park	Baby Rose	—	—
25 August	London	England	Wembley Stadium	Tears for Fears	—	—
27 August	London	England	Wembley Stadium	Tears for Fears	—	—
28 August	London	England	Wembley Stadium	Tears for Fears	—	—
Total					—	—

=== Cancelled concerts ===
List of cancelled concerts
Date (2026)	City	Country	Venue	Reason	Ref.
21 July	São Paulo	Brazil	Estádio do MorumBIS	Illness	
