= Falling (Harry Styles song) =

2020 single by Harry Styles

- BRITs live version cover

Single by Harry Styles

from the album Fine Line
- Released: 7 March 2020
- Studio: RAK (London); Harpoon House (Los Angeles, California)
- Genre: Pop-soul
- Length: 4:00
- Label: Erskine; Columbia
- Songwriters: Harry Styles; Thomas Hull
- Producer: Kid Harpoon

Harry Styles singles chronology
"Adore You" (2019)	"Falling" (2020)	"Watermelon Sugar" (2020)

Music video
- "Falling" on YouTube

"Falling" is a song by English singer-songwriter Harry Styles. This ballad was released through Erskine and Columbia Records on 7 March 2020 as the third single from his second studio album, Fine Line (2019). The song was written by Styles and Kid Harpoon, the latter of whom also handled the song's production.

== Background and release ==
"Tom had come up to my place to grab something, and he'd sat at the piano and I'd just got out of the shower. He started playing, and we wrote it there. So I was completely naked when I wrote that song."

— Harry Styles, Rolling Stone.

Styles and songwriter/producer Kid Harpoon first worked together on Styles' self-titled debut album (2017) on two songs: "Carolina" and "Sweet Creature". He would also become later the music director of Styles' first world solo tour. While working on his second album, Styles was seeing in the studio working on new music with Harpoon on 15 May 2019. While talking about Styles and the recording process of the album, Harpoon claimed: "He's got this wise-beyond-his-years timelessness about him. That's why he went on a whole emotional exploration with these songs. He went through this breakup that had a big impact on him." Harpoon then suggested Styles to write about his feelings towards it, saying:" He had a whole emotional journey about her, this whole relationship. But I kept saying, 'The best way of dealing with it is to put it in these songs you're writing.'" Regarding "Falling" in particular, he told: " Harry lives round the corner from me in LA and one day he wanted a lift somewhere, so I popped up there and he was getting out of the shower. I started playing piano while I was waiting for him, he was singing and in an hour we had written 'Falling'." The song was eventually released as the album's third single on 7 March 2020 to UK adult contemporary stations.

== Composition ==
Written by Styles and producer Kid Harpoon, "Falling" is a "hushed" soul piano ballad, that runs for four minutes long. In an interview Styles commented that the song was lyrically about slipping back into old ways, becoming a person he didn't want to be again and trying to be a better person. In an interview with Radio.com, Styles states that "Falling" is, "That feeling of kind of being overwhelmed, you know you can feel like you’re drowning sometimes… and the fact that it's coming from the piano, I guess it's like writing these songs are what helps but also they can hurt you sometimes." According to Laura Snapes from The Guardian, "the line, 'no one to blame but the drink in my wandering hands', from Falling, has prompted tabloid headlines." In another line, he sings: "I'm well aware I write too many songs about you." In fact, the song was said to be written about his breakup with ex-girlfriend Camille Rowe. Hannah Mylrea from NME also noted that "he alludes to the fact he cheated on his ex, admitting that 'there's no one to blame but the drink in my wandering hands."

== Critical reception ==
Most critics were positive with the song. Bryan Rolli from Consequence of Sound named it a "gorgeous piano ballad [...] a readymade mid-set tearjerker if there ever was one." Alexandra Pollard from The Independent called it a "moody, Moog-y lamentation." Writing for Slant Magazine, Anna Richmond praised its introspectiveness and noted that "the line 'What am I now? What if I'm someone I don't want around' is one of Fine Line's most moving moments." Jon Pareles of The New York Times described it as a "hymnlike, bitterly self-accusatory [song]." Susan Hansen of Clash praised it, saying that it "holds much appeal. It's a song where piano and Moog bass form a relaxed base for introspection and sincerity." Rolling Stone's Rob Sheffield was less favourable, calling it a "forgettable ballad," although he praised Styles for the lyrical content, claiming: "If there's a nontoxic masculinity, Harry Styles just might've found it."

== Accolades ==
Awards and nominations for "Falling"
Organization	Year	Category	Result	Ref.
ADG Excellence in Production Design Award	2021	Short Format: Web Series, Music Video or Commercial	Won (Note: The award goes to: Production Designer: François Audouy Art Director: A. Todd Holland Set Designer: Scott Herbertson Concept Illustrator: Landon Lott Set Decorator: Neil Wyzanowski)	

== Chart performance ==
"Falling" debuted at number 39 on the UK Singles Chart and later peaked at number 15, making it the fourth song from Fine Line to chart in the UK top 20. In November 2020, it received a platinum certification from the British Phonographic Industry (BPI) for selling 600,000 units in the United Kingdom, to be followed by double platinum in 2022, and triple platinum in 2026. In the United States, "Falling" was certified platinum by the Recording Industry Association of America (RIAA) for sales of 1 million track-equivalent units.

== Music video ==
The music video, directed by Dave Meyers, was released on 28 February 2020. The production design by François Audouy was awarded an Art Directors Guild Excellence in Production Design award, which was the first time the ADG had recognized a music video with a trophy in its 20-year history.

=== Synopsis ===
The video opens up with Styles in an apartment, drenched and gasping for air. The video flashes in Styles’ first verse, and begins to feature him alone in the apartment with a piano. As he sings the ballad, the room slowly fills with water, until, in the end, he is fully submerged, drowning, but still conscious.

== Live performances ==
On 18 February 2020, Styles performed the song for the first time at the 2020 Brit Awards.

== Cover versions ==
- British girl group Little Mix performed an acoustic cover version of the song as part of Radio 1's Live Lounge in September 2020.
- British singer Gabrielle included a cover of "Falling" on her 2021 album Do It Again following a live performance of the song during an episode of The Masked Singer, where she was a contestant as Harlequin.
- BTS member Jungkook released a cover of the song on YouTube in October 2021.
- Kelly Clarkson covered the song on her talk show Kellyoke segment aired on May 5, 2022.

== Credits and personnel ==
Credits adapted from the liner notes of Fine Line.

=== Recording ===
- Recorded at RAK Studios (London) and Harpoon House (Los Angeles, California)
- Mixed at EastWest Studios (Los Angeles, California)
- Mastered at Sterling Sound (Edgewater, New Jersey)

=== Personnel ===
- Harry Styles – vocals, backing vocals, songwriting
- Kid Harpoon – production, songwriting, piano, moog bass, organ
- Tyler Johnson – additional production
- Leo Abrahams – electric guitar
- Sammy Witte – engineering
- Dan Ewins – assistant engineering
- Spike Stent – mixing
- Michael Freeman – mix assistant
- Randy Merrill – mastering

== Charts ==
=== Weekly charts ===
Weekly chart performance for "Falling"
Chart (2019–2020)	Peak position
Australia (ARIA)	35
Belgium (Ultratip Bubbling Under Flanders)	36
Canada Hot 100 (Billboard)	55
Croatia (HRT)	21
Czech Republic Singles Digital (ČNS IFPI)	69
Euro Digital Song Sales (Billboard)	12
Global 200 (Billboard)	132
Greece (IFPI)	51
Ireland (IRMA)	22
Latvia (LAIPA)	48
Lithuania (AGATA)	33
Mexico Ingles Airplay (Billboard)	13
New Zealand (Recorded Music NZ)	24
Portugal (AFP)	43
Scottish Singles Sales (Official Charts)	6
Slovakia Singles Digital (ČNS IFPI)	74
South Korea (Gaon)	157
Sweden (Sverigetopplistan)	81
Switzerland (Schweizer Hitparade)	55
UK Singles (Official Charts)	15
US Billboard Hot 100	62
US Rolling Stone Top 100	34

=== Year-end charts ===
Year-end chart performance for "Falling"
Chart (2020)	Position
Australia (ARIA)	78
Ireland (IRMA)	41
UK Singles (OCC)	34

== Certifications ==
Certifications and sales for "Falling"
Region	Certification	Certified units/sales
Australia (ARIA)	4× Platinum	280,000^{‡}
Austria (IFPI Austria)	Gold	15,000^{‡}
Brazil (Pro-Música Brasil)	2× Platinum	80,000^{‡}
Canada (Music Canada)	4× Platinum	320,000^{‡}
Denmark (IFPI Danmark)	Platinum	90,000^{‡}
France (SNEP)	Gold	100,000^{‡}
Germany (BVMI)	Gold	300,000^{‡}
Italy (FIMI)	Gold	35,000^{‡}
Mexico (AMPROFON)	Diamond	300,000^{‡}
New Zealand (RMNZ)	4× Platinum	120,000^{‡}
Norway (IFPI Norway)	Gold	30,000^{‡}
Poland (ZPAV)	Platinum	50,000^{‡}
Portugal (AFP)	Platinum	10,000^{‡}
Spain (Promusicae)	Platinum	60,000^{‡}
United Kingdom (BPI)	3× Platinum	1,800,000^{‡}
United States (RIAA)	3× Platinum	3,000,000^{‡}
^{‡} Sales+streaming figures based on certification alone.

== Release history ==
Release formats for "Falling"
Region	Date	Format	Version	Label	Ref.
Various	18 February 2020	Digital download	Live at the BRITs	Erskine; Columbia	
United Kingdom	7 March 2020	Adult contemporary	Original	Erskine; Columbia	
