= Dance No More =

2026 single by Harry Styles

Single by Harry Styles

from the album Kiss All the Time. Disco, Occasionally
- Released: 12 June 2026
- Studio: RAK (London); Hansa (Berlin)
- Genre: Synth-funk; disco; funk
- Length: 3:14
- Label: Erskine; Columbia
- Songwriters: Harry Styles; Kid Harpoon
- Producer: Kid Harpoon

Harry Styles singles chronology
"American Girls" (2026)	"Dance No More" (2026)	"Coming Up Roses" (2026)

Music video
- "Dance No More" on YouTube

"Dance No More" is a song by English singer and songwriter Harry Styles, released on 6 March 2026, as the tenth track on his fourth studio album, Kiss All the Time. Disco, Occasionally. (2026). Styles wrote the song alongside Thomas "Kid Harpoon" Hull, who was the song's producer. It has been seen as a fan favourite of the album and has been highlighted in reviews. The song received a music video on 7 May 2026, before becoming the third single from the album on 12 June 2026.

== Composition and lyrics ==
"Dance No More" features lyrics such as "DJs don't dance no more" and "We wanna dance with all our friends." The line "Be a good girl, go get it, Fox" refers to Kid Harpoon's son Fox. As Styles stated in an interview with Zane Lowe:

I remember going out the first time in Berlin and standing in the middle of the dance floor and feeling so unbelievably free and safe, that I kind of just had my hands in the air and my eyes closed, so that I felt these tears streaming down my face. It was this moment of, like, 'I feel so alive right now.'

— Harry Styles, in Zane Lowe, Interview with Zane Lowe,

== Release and reception ==
"Dance No More" was released as the tenth track on Kiss All the Time. Disco, Occasionally on 6 March 2026. The song received a music video on May 7, 2026, and on 12 June 2026, it was sent to Italian radio airplay by Sony Music.

Writing for Clash, Robin Murray called it simply a "brilliant call-and-response number". In a review for Variety, Jem Aswad noted that it was an "outlier in the batch. With a funky groove, '80s synthesizer stabs, party noises", noting that "it has a loose, fun, carefree vibe found nowhere else on the album. It’s a prime early candidate for Song of the Summer 2026 — and, perfectly on brand for this album". Paste magazine noted that it "features rhythm interludes similar to 'Uptown Funk'". BBC Music correspondent Mark Savage notes that "the delightfully barmy 'Dance No More' bounds along on an irresistible groove as the singer leads a chant of 'respect your mother'." Stereogum critic Chris DeVilli calls it a "vacuum-sealed disco-funk jam".

== Music video ==
The music video for "Dance No More" premiered on 7 May 2026. Directed by Colin Solal Cardo and shot in VistaVision, it features Styles dancing in a gym wearing red shorts to an audience of young adults.

== Live performances ==
On 14 March 2026, Styles performed "Dance No More" on Saturday Night Live, along with "Coming Up Roses".

== Credits and personnel ==
Credits adapted from Pitchfork.

=== Locations ===
- RAK Studios (London)
- Hansa Studios (Berlin)

=== Musicians ===
- Harry Styles – vocals, music, lyricist
- Tom Skinner – drums, backing vocals
- Yaffra – synthesizers, backing vocals
- House Gospel Choir – choir
- Stella Blackmon – backing vocals
- Luis Viner – backing vocals

=== Technical ===
- Kid Harpoon – backing vocals, music, lyricist, producer
- Brian Rajaratnam – engineer
- Liam Hebb – backing vocals, engineer
- Kian Moghaddamzadeh – assistant engineer
- Tommy Bosustow – assistant engineer
- Alfie Scott – assistant engineer

== Charts ==
=== Weekly charts ===
Weekly chart performance
Chart (2026)	Peak position
Argentina Anglo Airplay (Monitor Latino)	14
Australia (ARIA)	29
Bolivia Anglo Airplay (Monitor Latino)	10
Canada Hot 100 (Billboard)	32
Central America Anglo Airplay (Monitor Latino)	16
Chile Anglo Airplay (Monitor Latino)	10
Estonia Airplay (TopHit)	64
Finland Airplay (Radiosoittolista)	90
Global 200 (Billboard)	28
Greece International (IFPI)	42
Ireland (IRMA)	93
Italy Airplay (EarOne)	19
Kazakhstan Airplay (TopHit)	10
Latvia Airplay (LaIPA)	10
Mexico Anglo Airplay (Monitor Latino)	3
Netherlands (Single Tip)	2
New Zealand (Recorded Music NZ)	32
Nicaragua Anglo Airplay (Monitor Latino)	2
Norway (VG-lista)	78
Panama Anglo Airplay (Monitor Latino)	7
Portugal (AFP)	40
Romania Airplay (TopHit)	189
San Marino Airplay (SMRTV Top 50)	26
Serbia Airplay (Radiomonitor)	8
Sweden (Sverigetopplistan)	84
UK Singles (Official Charts)	55
Uruguay Anglo Airplay (Monitor Latino)	7
US Billboard Hot 100	26
Venezuela Anglo Airplay (Monitor Latino)	12

=== Monthly charts ===
Monthly chart performance
Chart (2026)	Peak position
Estonia Airplay (TopHit)	70
Kazakhstan Airplay (TopHit)	18

== Certifications ==
Region	Certification	Certified units/sales
United Kingdom (BPI)	Silver	200,000^{‡}
^{‡} Sales+streaming figures based on certification alone.

== Release history ==
Release history and formats
Region	Date	Format(s)	Label	Ref.
Italy	12 June 2026	Radio airplay	Sony Music Italy	
