= Coming Up Roses (Harry Styles song) =

Single by Harry Styles

from the album Kiss All the Time. Disco, Occasionally.
- Released: 30 October 2026
- Studio: Abbey Road (London); RAK (London); Hansa (Berlin)
- Length: 4:08
- Label: Erskine; Columbia
- Songwriter: Harry Styles
- Producer: Kid Harpoon

Harry Styles singles chronology
"Dance No More" (2026)	"Coming Up Roses" (2026)

Music video
- "Coming Up Roses" on YouTube

"Coming Up Roses" is a song by the English singer Harry Styles from his fourth studio album Kiss All the Time. Disco, Occasionally (2026). It was produced by Kid Harpoon and arranged by Jules Buckley. "Coming Up Roses" was released as the album's fourth single on 30 October 2026.

== Background ==
In an interview with Zane Lowe on Apple Music 1, Harry Styles stated that he wrote "Coming Up Roses" in December 2025 and originally conceived it as a Christmas song, but abandoned the concept after the first two lines ("Tell me your fears / I've turned back the clocks, it's that time of year"). He explained it is a love song that conveys the idea that a relationship can be special even if it does not last forever. The song was first debuted by Fred Again during his London concert on 26 February 2026.

== Composition ==
The song is accompanied by piano and a 39-piece orchestra. The string section includes violins and cello, employing pizzicato strings as well. The lyrics depict a romantic encounter between two lovers, as they admit their insecurities and struggle to communicate their feelings. Notably, Harry Styles suggests to spend the night "hangover chasing", implying they would get drunk in a safe space. Although they fear their relationship may be short-lived, Styles decides to focus on the present moment regardless. The song features an interlude of orchestral strings towards the end, symbolizing the uncertainty of the relationship, before Styles concludes "It's only me and you" as the strings fade away.

== Critical reception ==
The song received generally positive reviews. John Earls of Classic Pop commented that Harry Styles "shines" on the song's "lush orchestration", calling it "a drama which will still sound sumptuous on the daytime radio play it'll surely be getting in 30 years." Reviewing Kiss All the Time. Disco, Occasionally for Consequence, Paolo Ragusa called the song "undeniably pretty", though he felt that it did not "fit in the same world" as the other tracks on the album due to its instrumentation style. Ludovic Hunter-Tilney of Financial Times described the song as "imaginatively orchestrated balladry", while Paste's Matt Mitchell described it as "dramatic and swooning, layered in colorful plucks and luxuriating strings." Mitchell went on to remark that "Styles' voice doesn't quite decorate the song fully" but the orchestra "narrows the gap", and the instrumental break "turns playful, oddly (and excellently) channeling Bacharach on a tape that's otherwise industrial, fluid, and trippy." Nicole Fell of The Hollywood Reporter considered it the most unique song on the album "simply because it deviates away from the established sonic formula and goes more stripped back," while also opining that "With its waltz beat, it would serve as the perfect soundtrack to the grand gesture moment of any romance film." AllMusic's Neil Z. Yeung called the song "gorgeous", writing that it "swells with lush, orchestral beauty arranged by Jules Buckley and shines a spotlight on Styles' vocals." Roisin O'Connor of The Independent praised the song as "beautifully arranged" and remarked that "Styles channels Chet Baker here on what is perhaps his best vocal performance, with gorgeous phrasing and careful annunciation." Vulture's Craig Jenkins called it a "string-draped, forlorn Disney-prince ballad". Sowing of Sputnikmusic described the song as "ever so elegant – it's dripping with romance and would make a hell of a wedding song." John Murphy of MusicOMH responded less favorably, stating the song "has a lovely orchestration behind it but not much else".

== Live performances ==
Harry Styles performed the song on Saturday Night Live on 14 March 2026. It was added to the set list of his third concert tour Together, Together.

== Charts ==
Weekly chart performance
Chart (2026)	Peak position
Australia (ARIA)	21
Belgium (Ultratop 50 Flanders)	45
Canada Hot 100 (Billboard)	21
Chile Anglo Airplay (Monitor Latino)	10
France (SNEP)	172
Global 200 (Billboard)	14
Germany (GfK)	51
Greece International (IFPI)	19
Ireland (IRMA)	17
Malaysia (IFPI)	11
Malaysia International (RIM)	10
Netherlands (Single Top 100)	95
New Zealand (Recorded Music NZ)	16
New Zealand Airplay (RCS)	12
Norway (VG-lista)	25
Philippines Hot 100 (Billboard Philippines)	73
Portugal (AFP)	16
Singapore (RIAS)	12
Spain (Promusicae)	96
Sweden (Sverigetopplistan)	55
UK Singles (Official Charts)	24
Uruguay Anglo Airplay (Monitor Latino)	11
US Billboard Hot 100	18
US Adult Pop Airplay (Billboard)	29
US Pop Airplay (Billboard)	30

== Release history ==
Release dates and formats for "Coming Up Roses"
Region	Date	Format	Label(s)	Ref.
Italy	30 October 2026	Radio airplay	Sony Music Italy	
United States	3 November 2026	Contemporary hit radio	Columbia	
