= Getdown Services =

British rock and pop duo

Getdown Services are a British rock and pop duo from Minehead, consisting of Ben Sadler and Josh Law. They have described their sound as "disco and eighties and like seventies infused groove based music" with other influences, including classic rock.

== Career ==
Sadler and Law met at school in Minehead, Somerset and are now based in Bristol.. In 2022, they self-released the single "Biscuit Tin", with proceeds going towards the local chapter of the ACORN renters' union, followed by "Cream of the Crop" in 2023. That same year, they signed with Bristol-based Breakfast Records and released their debut album Crisps.

The band have garnered a cult following with a reputation for being "Britain's best band". Following support slots for Fat Dog, Donny Benét and Antony Szmierek, they played a sold-out headline UK tour in autumn 2024. The following year, they appeared at a number of summer festivals including Iceland Airwaves, Plisskën and Glastonbury. In 2026 they played at the Southbank Centre in London as part of the Meltdown festival curated by Harry Styles as well as supporting the Super Furry Animals on parts of their UK tour.

== Discography ==
Getdown Services discography
- Studio albums: 2
- EPs: 4
- Singles: 3

=== Studio albums ===
| Title | Details | Peak chart positions |
| Title | Details | UK |
|---|---|---|
| Crisps | Released: 9 November 2023; Label: Breakfast Records; Formats: LP, CD, digital download, streaming | — |
| Massive Champion | Released: 14 August 2026; Label: Breakfast Records; Formats: digital download, streaming, LP | 75 |

=== Extended plays ===
| Title | Details |
|---|---|
| Crumbs | Released: 5 June 2024; Label: Breakfast Records; Formats: 12" vinyl, digital download, streaming |
| Your Medal's in the Post | Released: 14 November 2024; Label: Breakfast Records; Formats: CD, vinyl, digital download, streaming |
| Primordial Slot Machine | Released: 6 June 2025; Label: Breakfast Records; Formats: CD, vinyl, digital download, streaming |
| Crumbs 2 | Released: 5 November 2025; Label: Breakfast Records; Formats: 12" vinyl, digital download, streaming |
