= American Girls (Harry Styles song) =

- Digital cover

Single by Harry Styles

from the album Kiss All the Time. Disco, Occasionally
- Released: 6 March 2026
- Studio: Abbey Road (London); Hansa (Berlin); RAK (London); Ridgemont
- Genre: Italo disco; house
- Length: 3:33
- Label: Erskine; Columbia
- Songwriters: Harry Styles; Kid Harpoon; Tyler Johnson
- Producers: Kid Harpoon; Tyler Johnson

Harry Styles singles chronology
"Aperture" (2026)	"American Girls" (2026)	"Dance No More" (2026)

Music video
- "American Girls" on YouTube

"American Girls" is a song by English singer and songwriter Harry Styles from his fourth studio album, Kiss All the Time. Disco, Occasionally (2026). The track was written by Styles alongside Kid Harpoon and Tyler Johnson, the song's producers. "American Girls" was released as the second single on 6 March 2026 alongside the album. The song entered at the top of the UK Singles Chart, and peaked within the top ten of the charts in Australia, Austria, Belgium (Wallonia), Canada, Denmark, Germany, Greece, Iceland, Ireland, Latvia, the Netherlands, New Zealand and the United States.

== Background and composition ==
During the promotional cycle for his third album, Harry's House (2022), English singer and songwriter Harry Styles revealed he was starting to work on his fourth album, and started teasing a new release in December of 2025. On 15 January 2026, Styles confirmed that his fourth album, titled Kiss All the Time. Disco, Occasionally, was due for release on 6 March of that year. The track listing for the album was revealed on 23 January; "American Girls" appears as the album's second track.

It's like being truly vulnerable with someone, like sharing a life with someone like that. Having the time to stop and assess all of it and really look at my life from a bird's eye view and go, 'What do I actually want in my life?' [...] The song to me is actually quite a lonely song in a lot of ways.

— Harry Styles on "American Girls"

In an interview with Zane Lowe of Apple Music leading up to the album's release, Styles said he had taken inspiration for "American Girls" after seeing three of his close friends getting married and wanting to settle himself down in the near future.

"American Girls" was written by Styles, Kid Harpoon, and Tyler Johnson, and was produced by Kid Harpoon and Johnson. The song was recorded in Berlin at Hansa Studios, in London at both RAK Studios and Abbey Road Studios, and at Ridgemont Studio. Critics described the song as having an 80s music sound, specifically Italo disco and house music, and received comparisons by critics to the sounds of the 1975, James Blake, and David Bowie.

== Release and reception ==
"American Girls" was released as a single coinciding with its position as the second track on Kiss All the Time. Disco, Occasionally, which was released on 6 March 2026 through Erskine and Columbia Records. The song was released to Italian radio on 20 March 2026. It was received somewhat well by critics, who applauded the song's levity and its production while challenging its simplistic nature. Emma Swann of DIY noted the "pleasant" contrast of the use of synthesisers to the song's cadence, which she described as "warm and infectious". She likened the bassline of the song to David Bowie's 1977 song "Sound and Vision". NME's Rhian Daly called the song fun but "easily forgettable". Ed Power of The Irish Times noted the song's use of "gauzy"-sounding synths, but called the chorus annoying and "vacuous". Matt Mitchell of Paste similarly commented that Styles's voice pales in comparison to the production of the song.

At the 34th Camerimage International Cinematography Festival, the music video received a nomination for Best Music Video.

== Commercial performance ==
"American Girls" debuted atop the UK Singles Chart dated 13 March 2026 while its parent album debuted atop the UK Albums Chart. This marked Styles's second 'official chart double', with "As It Was" and Harry's House having simultaneously topped the singles and album charts in 2022. "American Girls" earned Styles his fourth number-one single in the UK, following "Sign of the Times" (2017), "As It Was" (2022) and "Aperture" (2026). This also made Kiss All the Time. Disco, Occasionally Styles's first album to contain multiple UK chart-toppers.

The song also topped the Billboard Global 200 and its companion chart excluding the United States, becoming Styles's third and second number-one on the charts respectively. "American Girls" led the Global 200 with 50.9 million streams and 3,000 copies sold worldwide in its first week of release. 30.6 million streams and 1,000 sales were outside the US.

== Music video ==
A music video for "American Girls" premiered the same day as the release of Kiss All the Time. Disco, Occasionally. Directed by James Mackel, the video shows Styles performing stunts on a film set, driving under a truck that later explodes during a wake. He is also seen going on a joyride with a stunt double. Near the end of the video, Styles is revealed to be watching the video from a director's chair.

== Credits and personnel ==
Credits adapted from Pitchfork.

- Harry Styles – vocals, composition, lyrics
- Kid Harpoon – production, composition, lyrics
- Tyler Johnson – production, composition, lyrics
- Tom Skinner – drums
- Mark Stent – mixing
- Kieran Beardmore – assistant mixing
- Emily Lazar – mastering
- Bob DeMaa – assistant mastering
- Brian Rajaratnam – engineering
- Liam Hebb – additional engineering
- Kian Moghaddamzadeh – assistant engineering
- Francesca Edwards – assistant engineering
- Tommy Bosustow – assistant engineering
- Seth Taylor – assistant engineering
- Gili Portal – assistant engineering
- Alfie Scott – assistant engineering

== Charts ==
=== Weekly charts ===
Weekly chart performance
Chart (2026)	Peak position
Argentina Hot 100 (Billboard)	52
Australia (ARIA)	3
Australia Airplay (RCS)	3
Austria (Ö3 Austria Top 40)	2
Belgium (Ultratop 50 Flanders)	4
Belgium (Ultratop 50 Wallonia)	3
Bolivia Airplay (Monitor Latino)	14
Brazil Hot 100 (Billboard)	72
Canada Hot 100 (Billboard)	5
Canada AC (Billboard)	6
Canada CHR/Top 40 (Billboard)	4
Canada Hot AC (Billboard)	14
Canada Modern Rock (Billboard Canada)	39
Central America Anglo Airplay (Monitor Latino)	2
Central America + Caribbean Airplay (BMAT)	18
Chile Anglo Airplay (Monitor Latino)	10
CIS Airplay (TopHit)	177
Colombia Anglo Airplay (National-Report)	2
Costa Rica Airplay (FONOTICA)	16
Croatia (Billboard)	24
Croatia International Airplay (Top lista)	8
Czech Republic Airplay (ČNS IFPI)	13
Czech Republic Singles Digital (ČNS IFPI)	18
Denmark (Tracklisten)	7
Denmark Airplay (Tracklisten)	1
Dominican Republic Anglo Airplay (Monitor Latino)	4
Ecuador Anglo Airplay (Monitor Latino)	6
El Salvador Anglo Airplay (Monitor Latino)	4
Estonia Airplay (TopHit)	2
Finland (Suomen virallinen lista)	28
Finland Airplay (Radiosoittolista)	9
France (SNEP)	56
Germany (GfK)	6
Global 200 (Billboard)	1
Greece International (IFPI)	9
Guatemala Airplay (Monitor Latino)	16
Honduras Anglo Airplay (Monitor Latino)	4
Hungary (Editors' Choice Top 40)	14
Iceland (Billboard)	4
Ireland (IRMA)	3
Israel (Mako Hitlist)	86
Italy (FIMI)	53
Japan Hot Overseas (Billboard Japan)	9
Kazakhstan Airplay (TopHit)	5
Latin America Anglo Airplay (Monitor Latino)	6
Latvia Airplay (LaIPA)	5
Latvia Streaming (LaIPA)	7
Lithuania (AGATA)	11
Luxembourg (Billboard)	14
Malta Airplay (Radiomonitor)	3
Mexico Airplay (Monitor Latino)	19
Netherlands (Dutch Top 40)	4
Netherlands (Single Top 100)	5
Netherlands Airplay (Radiomonitor)	4
New Zealand (Recorded Music NZ)	6
New Zealand Airplay (RCS)	15
Nicaragua Anglo Airplay (Monitor Latino)	2
Nigeria (TurnTable Top 100)	46
Nigeria International (TurnTable)	17
Nigeria Airplay (TurnTable)	13
North Macedonia Airplay (Radiomonitor)	3
Norway (VG-lista)	15
Panama International (PRODUCE)	16
Paraguay Anglo Airplay (Monitor Latino)	6
Peru Anglo Airplay (Monitor Latino)	8
Philippines Hot 100 (Billboard Philippines)	83
Poland Streaming (OLiS)	27
Portugal (AFP)	7
San Marino Airplay (SMRTV Top 50)	3
Serbia Airplay (Radiomonitor)	12
Slovakia Airplay (ČNS IFPI)	7
Slovakia Singles Digital (ČNS IFPI)	27
Slovenia Airplay (Radiomonitor)	10
South Africa Streaming (TOSAC)	77
Spain (Promusicae)	36
Sweden (Sverigetopplistan)	15
Switzerland (Schweizer Hitparade)	12
Turkey International Airplay (Radiomonitor Türkiye)	6
UK Singles (Official Charts)	1
Uruguay Anglo Airplay (Monitor Latino)	5
US Billboard Hot 100	4
US Adult Contemporary (Billboard)	16
US Adult Pop Airplay (Billboard)	8
US Pop Airplay (Billboard)	10
Venezuela Airplay (Record Report)	41

=== Monthly charts ===
Monthly chart performance
Chart (2026)	Peak position
Estonia Airplay (TopHit)	2
Kazakhstan Airplay (TopHit)	7
Latvia Airplay (TopHit)	8
Lithuania Airplay (TopHit)	15
Paraguay Airplay (SGP)	40

== Certifications ==
Certifications
Region	Certification	Certified units/sales
Belgium (BRMA)	Gold	20,000^{‡}
Canada (Music Canada)	Gold	40,000^{‡}
Hungary (MAHASZ)	Gold	2,000^{‡}
Mexico (AMPROFON)	Gold	70,000^{‡}
New Zealand (RMNZ)	Gold	15,000^{‡}
United Kingdom (BPI)	Platinum	600,000^{‡}
^{‡} Sales+streaming figures based on certification alone.

== Release history ==
Release history
Region	Date	Format(s)	Label	Ref.
United Kingdom	12 March 2026	Digital download	Erskine; Columbia	
Italy	20 March 2026	Radio airplay	Sony Italy	
United States	24 March 2026	Contemporary hit radio	Columbia	
