= Aperture (song) =

2026 single by Harry Styles

Single by Harry Styles

from the album Kiss All the Time. Disco, Occasionally
- Released: 23 January 2026
- Genre: Electropop
- Length: 5:11
- Label: Erskine; Columbia
- Songwriters: Harry Styles; Kid Harpoon
- Producer: Kid Harpoon

Harry Styles singles chronology
"Satellite" (2023)	"Aperture" (2026)	"American Girls" (2026)

Music video
- "Aperture" on YouTube

"Aperture" is a song by the British singer and songwriter Harry Styles. It was released on 23 January 2026 through Erskine and Columbia Records as the lead single from his fourth studio album, Kiss All the Time. Disco, Occasionally (2026). Styles co-wrote the track with Kid Harpoon, who also produced it.

The single debuted at number one on the UK singles chart and the US Billboard Hot 100, becoming Styles's third number-one single in both the UK and US. It also topped the Irish chart, Italian airplay chart, and reached the top ten in Australia, Germany, Iceland, the Netherlands, New Zealand, Norway, and Sweden. At the 2026 UK Music Video Awards, it received an award for Best Pop Video – UK.

== Background and release ==
On 15 January 2026, Styles announced the release of his fourth studio album, Kiss All the Time. Disco, Occasionally, scheduled for 6 March 2026. The album was announced to include twelve tracks and to be executive produced by Kid Harpoon. In the days leading up to the announcement, the singer dropped cryptic messages across the world. One such message included the line "let the light in", which later turned out to be a lyric from "Aperture". Additionally, fans signed up to Styles' official HSHQ WhatsApp channel would receive a camera emoji if the line had previously been typed in.

On 20 January, Styles announced that the lead single would be released on 23 January 2026, 00:00 Greenwich Mean Time. The announcement was accompanied by a photograph of Styles cheering in a recording studio, captioned with the song title and its release time. A website previously set up under the title "WeBelongTogether.co" was subsequently updated with an image of Styles and a group of people sitting in a park painting. The day before release, Styles mounted a series of eleven listening sessions in various record stores. The title "Aperture" also signifies "opening", which has been widely interpreted as a symbolic introduction to a new musical era. Styles wrote "Aperture" with Kid Harpoon, who also produced the track.

== Music video ==
The music video for the song was released on YouTube on 23 January 2026, was filmed in Westin Bonaventure Hotel in Los Angeles. Directed by Aube Perrie, the video takes inspiration from Spike Jonze directed "Weapon of Choice" (2001), and the film Dirty Dancing (1987). Josiah Gogarty of British GQ compared the video to the music video for David Bowie's 1997 single "I'm Afraid of Americans". At the 2026 UK Music Video Awards, it was nominated for Best Pop Video – UK and Best Performance in a Video, winning the former.

== Critical reception ==
NME highlighted the track's slow-building electronic approach, noting its euphoric house piano elements and drawing comparisons to LCD Soundsystem, calling it one of the boldest and least familiar sounds in Styles's catalogue. Writing for The Independent, Roisin O'Connor similarly pointed to influences from Robyn and LCD Soundsystem, praising the song's delayed-gratification structure and intimate vocal delivery. Showbiz by PS emphasised the track as a risky yet confident artistic step, noting its blend of electronic, disco, and techno-inspired elements, and framing it as a non-radio-friendly lead single that reveals its strengths gradually with repeated listens. Paolo Ragusa of Consequence called the song "a throbbing piece of dance music with Styles' signature romantic overtones."

== Personnel ==
These credits have been adapted from music streaming services Apple Music and Tidal.

- Harry Styles – composition, lyrics, vocals
- Kid Harpoon – composition, lyrics, production, executive production
- Ellie Rowsell – background vocals
- Aleysha Eve – choir vocals
- CJ Idos – choir vocals
- Cartell Green-Brown – choir vocals
- Daniel Thomas – choir vocals
- Dean Patron – choir vocals
- Gemma Knight Jones – choir vocals
- Harrison Atlee – choir vocals
- House Gospel Choir – choir
- Laura Leon – choir vocals
- Monday Osarobo – choir vocals
- Monique Meade – choir vocals
- Natalie Maddix – choir vocals
- Shayanne Campbell – choir vocals
- Vania Lima – choir vocals
- Zaza Wright – choir vocals
- Yaffra – piano
- Brian Rajaratnam – engineering
- Mark "Spike" Stent – mixing
- Emily Lazar – mastering
- Alfie Scott – assistant engineering
- Gili Portal – assistant engineering
- Kian Moghaddamzadeh – assistant engineering
- Isaac Allen – assistant engineering
- Tommy Bosustow – assistant engineering
- Kieran Beardmore – assistant mixing
- Bob DeMaa – assistant mastering
- Liam Hebb – additional engineering

== Charts ==
=== Weekly charts ===
Weekly chart performance
Chart (2026)	Peak position
Argentina Hot 100 (Billboard)	55
Australia (ARIA)	2
Austria (Ö3 Austria Top 40)	5
Belgium (Ultratop 50 Flanders)	4
Belgium (Ultratop 50 Wallonia)	12
Bolivia Anglo Airplay (Monitor Latino)	3
Brazil Hot 100 (Billboard)	57
Canada Hot 100 (Billboard)	4
Canada AC (Billboard)	20
Canada CHR/Top 40 (Billboard)	10
Canada Hot AC (Billboard)	13
Central America Anglo Airplay (Monitor Latino)	2
Central America + Caribbean (BMAT)	11
Chile Airplay (Monitor Latino)	15
Colombia Anglo Airplay (Monitor Latino)	8
CIS Airplay (TopHit)	63
Costa Rica Airplay (FONOTICA)	18
Croatia (Billboard)	14
Croatia International Airplay (Top lista)	11
Czech Republic Airplay (ČNS IFPI)	6
Czech Republic Singles Digital (ČNS IFPI)	12
Denmark (Tracklisten)	7
Dominican Republic Anglo Airplay (Monitor Latino)	5
Ecuador Anglo Airplay (Monitor Latino)	5
El Salvador Airplay (ASAP EGC)	7
Estonia Airplay (TopHit)	5
Finland (Suomen virallinen lista)	29
France (SNEP)	44
Germany (GfK)	7
Global 200 (Billboard)	1
Greece International (IFPI)	4
Guatemala Airplay (Monitor Latino)	15
Hungary (Single Top 40)	32
Iceland (Billboard)	2
Ireland (IRMA)	1
Israel (Mako Hitlist)	69
Italy (FIMI)	27
Japan Hot Overseas (Billboard Japan)	5
Latin America Anglo Airplay (Monitor Latino)	4
Latvia Airplay (LaIPA)	1
Latvia Streaming (LaIPA)	2
Lithuania (AGATA)	1
Luxembourg (Billboard)	12
Malta Airplay (Radiomonitor)	14
Mexico Anglo Airplay (Monitor Latino)	3
Netherlands (Dutch Top 40)	14
Netherlands (Single Top 100)	3
New Zealand (Recorded Music NZ)	3
Nicaragua Anglo Airplay (Monitor Latino)	2
Nigeria (TurnTable Top 100)	44
Nigeria International (TurnTable)	10
Nigeria Airplay (TurnTable)	16
North Macedonia Airplay (Radiomonitor)	2
Norway (VG-lista)	9
Panama International (PRODUCE)	40
Paraguay Anglo Airplay (Monitor Latino)	6
Peru Anglo Airplay (Monitor Latino)	15
Philippines Hot 100 (Billboard Philippines)	86
Poland (Polish Streaming Top 100)	24
Portugal (AFP)	4
Puerto Rico Anglo Airplay (Monitor Latino)	7
Romania (Billboard)	22
Slovakia Airplay (ČNS IFPI)	20
Slovakia Singles Digital (ČNS IFPI)	15
Slovenia Airplay (Radiomonitor)	13
South Africa Airplay (TOSAC)	5
South Africa Streaming (TOSAC)	71
Spain (Promusicae)	21
Spain Airplay (Promusicae)	16
Sweden (Sverigetopplistan)	5
Switzerland (Schweizer Hitparade)	9
UK Singles (Official Charts)	1
Uruguay Anglo Airplay (Monitor Latino)	10
US Billboard Hot 100	1
US Adult Contemporary (Billboard)	15
US Adult Pop Airplay (Billboard)	9
US Dance Airplay (Billboard)	1
US Hot Dance/Pop Songs (Billboard)	1
US Pop Airplay (Billboard)	10
US Rhythmic Airplay (Billboard)	20
Venezuela Airplay (Record Report)	18

=== Monthly charts ===
Monthly chart performance
Chart (2026)	Peak position
CIS Airplay (TopHit)	68
Estonia Airplay (TopHit)	6
Latvia Airplay (TopHit)	39
Lithuania Airplay (TopHit)	20
Paraguay Airplay (SGP)	37

== Certifications ==
Certifications
Region	Certification	Certified units/sales
Belgium (BRMA)	Gold	20,000^{‡}
Mexico (AMPROFON)	Gold	70,000^{‡}
New Zealand (RMNZ)	Gold	15,000^{‡}
United Kingdom (BPI)	Gold	400,000^{‡}
^{‡} Sales+streaming figures based on certification alone.

== Release history ==
Release history
Region	Date	Format(s)	Label	Ref.
Various	23 January 2026	Digital download; streaming	Erskine; Columbia	
Italy	23 January 2026	Radio airplay	Sony Italy	
United States	26 January 2026	Hot adult contemporary radio	Columbia	
United States	27 January 2026	Contemporary hit radio	Columbia	
