= Kiss All the Time. Disco, Occasionally =

Kiss All the Time. Disco, Occasionally.

Studio album by Harry Styles
- Released: 6 March 2026
- Recorded: 2024 – 25 June 2025
- Studios: Abbey Road (London); RAK (London); Hansa (Berlin)
- Genres: Synth-pop; dance-pop; pop rock
- Length: 42:33
- Languages: English; Italian
- Labels: Erskine; Columbia
- Producers: Kid Harpoon; Tyler Johnson

Harry Styles chronology
Harry's House (2022)	Kiss All the Time. Disco, Occasionally. (2026)

Singles from Kiss All the Time. Disco, Occasionally.
- 1. "Aperture" Released: 23 January 2026; 2. "American Girls" Released: 6 March 2026; 3. "Dance No More" Released: 12 June 2026; 4. "Coming Up Roses" Released: 30 October 2026

Kiss All the Time. Disco, Occasionally. is the fourth studio album by the English singer and songwriter Harry Styles. It was released on 6 March 2026, by Erskine and Columbia Records. Produced by frequent collaborators Kid Harpoon and Tyler Johnson, the album features background vocals from Ellie Rowsell and the House Gospel Choir; additional contributors include Tom Skinner, John Metcalfe, and Jules Buckley. Musically, it marks a departure from the city pop and R&B influences of his previous album, Harry's House (2022), in favour of a dance-pop sound influenced by electronic music.

Kiss All the Time. Disco, Occasionally was recorded in various locations, including London and Berlin. Its lead single "Aperture" was released on 23 January 2026, while its second single, "American Girls", was released on alongside the album. Both singles debuted in the top 5 on the US Billboard Hot 100, with the former reaching number one, marking Styles's third US number-one single.

Kiss All the Time. Disco, Occasionally received positive reviews from critics. It opened with first-week sales of 430,000 album-equivalent units in the United States and topped the Billboard 200, and also topped the charts in numerous other territories, including the United Kingdom, Australia, Germany, France and Canada. Styles embarked on the Together, Together concert tour from May 2026 to August 2027 to promote the album.

== Background and promotion ==
English singer and songwriter Harry Styles released the studio albums Harry Styles (2017), Fine Line (2019), and Harry's House (2022) between 2017 and 2022, and promoted the last two with the 22-month Love On Tour until July 2023, after which he made sporadic public appearances. He stated in August 2022 that he was working on ideas for a fourth album. He was speculated to have begun recording it after being sighted visiting London's RAK Studios in 2024. In May 2025, it was reported that Styles was living in Berlin and working on his fourth studio album. The move to Berlin to "record a synthesiser-heavy album", with Styles "embracing big career pivots, and staying silent in between", drew comparisons to David Bowie's own move to Berlin to record his Berlin Trilogy. After the album was announced, Styles revealed that the album was largely inspired by LCD Soundsystem, describing their music and live shows as "joyous". The album's title comes from what Styles considers a "life mantra".

On 27 December 2025, Styles uploaded an eight-minute video to his YouTube channel, under the title "Forever, Forever", which included footage from the final show of his Love On Tour. It showcased him performing an original instrumental piece composed for the concert and concluded with the phrase "We Belong Together". On 12 January 2026, posters displaying the phrase were discovered in various cities globally. These posters directed individuals to Styles's newly established interactive website, webelongtogether.co, which subsequently redirected them to a text chat on WhatsApp. Two days later, a voice memo of Styles mumbling "we belong together" was sent to fans through text.

On 15 January, Styles announced his fourth studio album, Kiss All the Time. Disco, Occasionally, which was released on 6 March. The lead single, "Aperture", was announced on 20 January and released on 23 January. It was produced by Kid Harpoon. That same day, Styles announced Together, Together, a series of concert residencies in seven cities. The album's track listing was revealed the following day.

"American Girls" was released as the second single in conjunction with the album on 6 March. Styles also performed at Co-op Live in Manchester for a "one night only" concert the same day, which was released to Netflix as a concert film, Harry Styles: One Night in Manchester, two days later. He performed "Dance No More" and "Coming Up Roses" in their live debuts on Saturday Night Live on 14 March. A music video for "Dance No More" premiered on 7 May 2026. On 12 June 2026, it was sent to Italian radio airplay by Sony Music, as the album's third single. "Coming Up Roses" was released as the fourth single on 30 October 2026.

== Composition and recording ==
Recording for Kiss All the Time. Disco, Occasionally. began in 2024. Upon the album's release, Styles revealed via social media the album recording appeared to be completed on 25 June 2025. The album was mainly recorded in the UK and Germany at RAK and Abbey Road Studios in London and Hansa Studios in Berlin, with additional recording in the UK and USA, specifically at Clubhouse (New York), Green Oak Studios (Los Angeles), Angel Studios (London), Ridgemont Studios, and Traquillo Studios.

Styles co-wrote the album alongside Harpoon and Tyler Johnson, both of whom he has worked with throughout his solo career. Harpoon produced all 12 tracks on the album and serves as its executive producer, with Johnson having full and additional production credits on seven songs. The album features frequent collaborations with the London-based group House Gospel Choir, with select members appearing on lead single "Aperture" as well as "Are You Listening Yet?", "Season 2 Weight Loss", "Pop", and "Dance No More". English singer Ellie Rowsell, the lead singer of rock band Wolf Alice, contributes backing vocals to "Aperture", "Taste Back", and "Season 2 Weight Loss". The track "Coming Up Roses" features an orchestral arrangement by Styles, Harpoon, and English composer Jules Buckley. Musically, the record blends synth-pop, dance-pop, and pop rock with groove-driven production and elements of post-punk, indie electronic, alternative dance and funk.

== Critical reception ==
Professional ratings
Aggregate scores
Source	Rating
AnyDecentMusic?	7.1/10
Metacritic	73/100
Review scores
Source	Rating
Consequence	B
Financial Times	3/5 stars
The Guardian	3/5 stars
The Independent	4/5 stars
NME	4/5 stars
Paste	C
Pitchfork	5.6/10
Rolling Stone	4/5 stars
The Telegraph	3/5 stars
The Times	4/5 stars

According to the review aggregator Metacritic, Kiss All the Time. Disco, Occasionally. received "generally favorable reviews" based on a weighted average score of 73 out of 100 from twenty one critic scores. The review aggregator Any Decent Music gave the album a weighted average score of 7.1 out of 10 from nineteen critic scores. HuffPost UK's Daniel Welsh described the initial critic reception as "varying levels of positive", while PA Media's Casey Cooper-Fiske described it as mixed.

The Age's Tom W. Clarke awarded four stars out of five, calling the album a brave departure from Styles's previous albums. The Australian's Geordie Gray awarded three stars out of five. He enthusiastically complimented the production and lightly complimented the songwriting, but criticised Styles's voice, which he believed was his biggest strength, for taking a back seat. Although he clarified that he didn't consider the album "bad", he believed that the album ultimately failed as a dance music album, writing that it lacked in fun moments and adopted the signifiers of various dance music styles without adopting any of their quirkiness. BBC News' Mark Savage was impressed by the album's "funky" grooves. He felt Styles's vocals and "distant and disconnected" demeanor on several tracks were an "odd mismatch" with those grooves, but ultimately commended the "compellingly knotty" album as a brave departure from his previous works.

Billboard's Jason Lipshutz thought the album was Styles's most mature yet and praised the cohesion of the track listing. Clash's Robin Murray awarded a score of eight out of ten, praising the "physical impactness" of the album and referring to the lyricism as "thrilling, but also empathetic". Classic Pop's John Earls awarded it four-and-a-half stars out of five, complimenting the "maverick sonic choices" and emotive lyrics. Consequence's Paolo Ragusa awarded a B grade, writing that the album contained some of Styles's best songs but that it could have gone further in an "unhinged" direction. He also noted that the "ballad-adjacent" "Coming Up Roses" and "Paint by Numbers" did not fit well into the track listing. DIY's Emma Swann awarded four-and-a-half stars out of five, writing that Styles no longer seemed to be searching for his artistic identity, and praising the "excellent" album's "leftfield" sonic choices. Euphoria's Athena Sobhan awarded five stars out of five, praising the experimentation relative to Styles's previous albums and writing that he "nails" the disco aesthetic. Financial Times' Ludovic Hunter-Tilney awarded three stars out of five. He enjoyed the album's "impressive" instrumentation and "audacious edge," but criticised Styles's vocals as "inadequately expressive"; he also felt the album lacked engaging lyrics and song structures. Flood Magazine's Kyle Lemmon praised the emotive lyrics, which he felt were the centre of the album, and the "infectious" music. The Guardian's Alexis Petridis awarded three stars out of five. He commended the album's sonic cohesion and lack of trend-chasing, and felt that it was generally a pleasant listening experience, but criticised a lack of memorability and vague lyricism.

British GQ's Ben Allen felt the album's lyrics were more mature than on Styles's previous works. He also praised the musicality. The Independent's Roisin O'Connor awarded four stars out of five, praising the album as a musically playful and emotionally vulnerable experience; positively comparing it to Styles's previous album, which she found bland; and concluding that Styles has found his identity. The Irish Times's Ed Power awarded three stars out of five and called the album a "profoundly okayish" letdown, citing a lack of substance. However, he did commend Styles's attempt to evolve his sound. JubileeCast's Timothy Yap awarded score of four out of five, praising the sonic cohesion, catchy hooks, and lyrical contrast between romance and melancholy. The London Standard's Maddy Mussen awarded four stars out of five, praising the production and playful tone, writing that "Aperture" is a "reverse Trojan horse" that does not accurately reflect the album's sound, which she describes as largely in line with his previous works, "just with a little more dance influence". She noted that the slower tracks were the weakest and let the album down.

Music Week's Ben Homewood wrote that the album was an improvement on Styles's strengths from previous works, listing choruses, lyrical introspection, quirkiness, and catchy melodies as examples. NME's Rhian Daly awarded four stars out of five, writing that Styles has grown past gossip-fuelled songwriting and "nailed" the ability to make personal songs that are not bogged down with minor details. He was also impressed by the album's "exploratory" and enveloping sound, though he found some tracks forgettable. The Observer's Kitty Empire called the album "fun" yet "confusing", praising Styles's mature lyrics yet noting musical and thematic meandering. Paste's Matt Mitchell awarded a C grade and wrote that Styles feels like a guest on his own album, calling the vocals largely overprocessed or muted, the lyrics often boring and cringe-inducing, and the songs too reliant on electronics and effects. Rolling Stone's Joe Levy awarded four stars out of five, describing the album as "delightfully strange, often lovely, and consistently fascinating", while Rolling Stone UK's Nick Reilly awarded four stars out of five, feeling frustrated by the "oblique" lyrics but writing that the music was "joyous" and "eclectic", calling the album "excellent". The Telegraph's Neil McCormick awarded three stars out of five, praising the "interesting and fun" sonics but criticising the vague lyrics and lack of substance, calling it "music that hints at big ideas and emotional depths without actually having either". The Times' Will Hodgkinson awarded four stars out of five, calling the album "musically deep and lyrically shallow" and praising the laid-back, fun atmosphere. USA Today's Melissa Ruggieri thought the album was quirky, writing: "Styles admirably dedicates himself to progressing, even if it doesn't mean gift-wrapped radio fodder". Variety's Jem Aswad praised Styles for taking a risk with the album's relaxed atmosphere.

== Commercial performance ==
In the United Kingdom, Kiss All the Time. Disco, Occasionally. opened with 183,045 album-equivalent units, marking the biggest opening week of Styles's career in the country and his third chart-topping album in the region, after Harry Styles (2017) and Harry's House (2022). Kiss All the Time. Disco, Occasionally. recorded the biggest opening week for a male solo artist in almost a decade, since Ed Sheeran's ÷ (2017), and sold 66,391 vinyl copies in its first week, marking the biggest first week vinyl album sales for a British artist in the 21st century, surpassing the record set by Sam Fender's People Watching (2025).

In the United States, Kiss All the Time. Disco, Occasionally. debuted at number one on the Billboard 200, as Styles's fourth consecutive chart-topping album in the country. According to Luminate figures, it opened with 430,000 album-equivalent units, consisting of 291,000 thousand pure album sales, 138.5 thousand streaming-equivalent albums (from 140.31 million on-demand streams of the album's tracks), and approximately five hundred track-equivalent units. Styles became the second solo male artist to have their first four albums top the chart, after DMX, and the first solo artist to debut at number one with their first four albums since Alicia Keys. According to Hits figures, the album opened with 424,176 album-equivalent units, consisting of 284,650 pure album sales, 138,795 streaming-equivalent albums, and 731 track-equivalent albums.

The 430,000 thousand unit tally marked the biggest US debut week by units of 2026, the biggest sales week for any album by units by any artist since Taylor Swift's The Life of a Showgirl (2025), and the biggest week by a solo male artist since Morgan Wallen's I'm the Problem (2025). The 291,000 thousand pure album tally is the biggest for any album since The Life of a Showgirl, and the biggest for a male solo artist since The Weeknd's Hurry Up Tomorrow (2025). This tally also included 186,000 thousand in vinyl sales, marking the biggest ever week for an album on vinyl by a male artist since Luminate began electronically recording vinyl sales data in 1991.

== Track listing ==
Kiss All the Time. Disco, Occasionally. track listing
No.	Title	Writer(s)	Length
1.	"Aperture"	Harry Styles; Thomas Hull	5:11
2.	"American Girls"	Styles; Hull; Tyler Johnson	3:33
3.	"Ready, Steady, Go!"	Styles; Hull; Johnson	2:40
4.	"Are You Listening Yet?"	Styles; Hull; Johnson	3:12
5.	"Taste Back"	Styles; Hull; Johnson	3:41
6.	"The Waiting Game"	Styles; Hull; Johnson	2:49
7.	"Season 2 Weight Loss"	Styles; Hull; Johnson	3:49
8.	"Coming Up Roses"	Styles	4:08
9.	"Pop"	Styles; Hull; Johnson	3:36
10.	"Dance No More"	Styles; Hull	3:14
11.	"Paint by Numbers"	Styles; Hull; Johnson	2:27
12.	"Carla's Song"	Styles; Hull	4:13
Total length:			42:33

== Personnel ==
Credits adapted from Tidal.

=== Vocalists ===
- Harry Styles – vocals (all tracks)
- House Gospel Choir (Note: The House Gospel Choir consists of singers Aleysha Eve, CJ Idos, Cartell Green-Brown, Daniel Thomas, Dean Patron, Gemma Knight Jones, Harrison Atlee, Laura Leon, Monday Osarobo, Monique Meade, Natalie Maddix, Shayanne Campbell, Vania Lima, and Zaza Wright.) – choir vocals (1, 4, 7, 9)
- Ellie Rowsell – background vocals (1, 5, 7)
- Yaffra – background vocals (10)
- Tom Skinner – background vocals (10)
- Kid Harpoon – background vocals (10)
- Liam Hebb – background vocals (10)
- Luis Viner – background vocals (10)
- Stella Blackmon – background vocals (10)

=== Musicians ===
- Yaffra – piano (1, 8, 12), synthesizer (10), organ (11)
- Tom Skinner – drums (2, 3, 7, 9–11)
- Harry Styles – arrangement (8)
- Kid Harpoon – arrangement (8)
- Jules Buckley – arrangement, celeste (8)
- Sam Wilson – marimba, vibraphone (8)
- Alessandro Ruisi – violin (8)
- Braimah Kanneh-Mason – violin (8)
- Charlie Brown – violin (8)
- Debbie Widdup – violin (8)
- Eloisa-Fleur Thom – violin (8)
- Ian Humphries – violin (8)
- Jackie Shave – violin (8)
- Jenny Sacha – violin (8)
- Jeremy Isaac – violin (8)
- John Mills – violin (8)
- Louisa Fuller – violin (8)
- Marianne Haynes – violin (8)
- Martyn Jackson – violin (8)
- Natalia Bonner – violin (8)
- Nicky Sweeney – violin (8)
- Richard George – violin (8)
- Sarah Daramy-Williams – violin (8)
- Thomas Gould – violin (8)
- Bruce White – viola (8)
- Emma Owens – viola (8)
- John Metcalfe – viola (8)
- Kate Musker – viola (8)
- Nicholas Bootiman – viola (8)
- Triona Milne – viola (8)
- Chris Worsey – cello (8)
- Ian Burdge – cello (8)
- Jonny Byers – cello (8)
- Katherine Jenkinson – cello (8)
- Laurence Ungless – double bass (8)
- Roger Linley – double bass (8)
- Toby Hughes – double bass (8)
- Chris Hill – double bass (8)
- Barnaby Robson – clarinet (8)
- Ruth Contractor – English horn (8)
- Eliza Marshall – flute (8)
- Owen Slade – tuba (8)
- Mark Crown – trumpet (11)

=== Technical ===
==== Production ====
- Kid Harpoon – production (all tracks), executive production
- Tyler Johnson – production (2, 4, 6, 9, 11), additional production (3, 5)

==== Engineering ====
- Brian Rajaratnam – engineering
- Nick Lobel – engineering (4)
- Owen Stoutt – engineering (5, 9), additional engineering (4)
- Liam Hebb – engineering (8), additional engineering (1–5, 7, 9, 10)
- James "Jez" Murphy – engineering (8)
- Emi Trevena – additional engineering (4, 5, 9)
- Alfie Scott – engineering assistance (1–4, 7–11)
- Gili Portal – engineering assistance (1–4, 7, 8, 11)
- Kian Moghaddamzadeh – engineering assistance (1–3, 7, 9–12)
- Tommy Bosustow – engineering assistance (1, 2, 4, 7–10)
- Isaac Allen – engineering assistance (1, 5, 7)
- Francesca Edwards – engineering assistance (2, 11)
- Seth Taylor – engineering assistance (2)
- Freddie Light – engineering assistance (3, 5)
- Joe Kress – engineering assistance (4)
- Major Quintero – engineering assistance (8)
- Tom Ashpitel – engineering assistance (8)
- Mark "Spike" Stent – mixing
- Kieran Beardmore – mixing assistance
- Emily Lazar – mastering
- Bob DeMaa – mastering assistance

== Charts ==
Chart performance
Chart (2026)	Peak position
Australian Albums (ARIA)	1
Austrian Albums (Ö3 Austria)	1
Belgian Albums (Ultratop Flanders)	1
Belgian Albums (Ultratop Wallonia)	1
Canadian Albums (Billboard)	1
Croatian International Albums (HDU)	1
Czech Albums (ČNS IFPI)	1
Danish Albums (Hitlisten)	1
Dutch Albums (Album Top 100)	1
Finnish Albums (Suomen virallinen lista)	1
French Albums (SNEP)	1
German Albums (Offizielle Top 100)	1
German Pop Albums (Offizielle Top 100)	1
Greek Albums (IFPI)	1
Hungarian Albums (MAHASZ)	1
Irish Albums (Official Charts)	1
Italian Albums (FIMI)	1
Japanese Digital Albums (Oricon)	23
Japanese Hot Albums (Billboard Japan)	26
Japanese Western Albums (Oricon)	8
Lithuanian Albums (AGATA)	1
New Zealand Albums (RMNZ)	1
Norwegian Albums (IFPI Norge)	1
Polish Albums (ZPAV)	2
Portuguese Albums (AFP)	1
Scottish Albums (Official Charts)	1
Slovak Albums (ČNS IFPI)	2
Spanish Albums (Promusicae)	1
Swedish Albums (Sverigetopplistan)	1
Swiss Albums (Schweizer Hitparade)	1
UK Albums (Official Charts)	1
US Billboard 200	1

== Certifications and sales ==
Certifications and sales
Region	Certification	Certified units/sales
Austria (IFPI Austria)	Gold	7,500^{‡}
Brazil (Pro-Música Brasil)	Gold	20,000^{‡}
Canada (Music Canada)	Gold	40,000^{‡}
Denmark (IFPI Danmark)	Gold	10,000^{‡}
France (SNEP)	Gold	50,000^{‡}
Germany (BVMI)	Gold	75,000^{‡}
Hungary (MAHASZ)	Gold	2,000^{‡}
Italy (FIMI)	Gold	25,000^{‡}
Netherlands (NVPI)	Platinum	37,200^{‡}
New Zealand (RMNZ)	Gold	7,500^{‡}
Poland (ZPAV)	Gold	15,000^{‡}
Portugal (AFP)	Platinum	7,000^{‡}
Spain (Promusicae)	Gold	20,000^{‡}
Sweden (GLF)	Gold	15,000^{‡}
United Kingdom (BPI)	Platinum	300,000^{‡}
^{‡} Sales+streaming figures based on certification alone.

== Release history ==
Release history
Date	Format	Label	Ref.
6 March 2026	Box set; cassette; CD; digital download; streaming; vinyl	Erskine; Columbia	
