= Brian Rajaratnam =

American sound engineer

- Born: September 2, 1991 (age 35); Monmouth Junction, New Jersey, United States
- Education: New York University, Berklee College of Music
- Occupation: Audio engineer

Brian Rajaratnam is an American audio engineer. He won a Grammy Award for his work on the song "Flowers" at the 66th Annual Grammy Awards alongside Miley Cyrus, Kid Harpoon, Tyler Johnson, Michael Pollack, Spike Stent, and Joe LaPorta.

== Biography ==
He was born and raised in New Jersey. His parents hailed from Sri Lanka and they moved from Sri Lanka to the United States. He then relocated to New York in order to pursue his ambitions of becoming a doctor, which involved following a conventional, traditional pathway expected of a South Asian origin. However, he changed his mind from pursuing his career to become a doctor to entering the music field, as he decided to quit his medical studies halfway through his pre-med tenure at college.

He insisted that music was always close to his heart especially during his time in Sri Lanka. He developed an interest and love with music during his visits to his aunt's house in Sri Lanka where he first began to play piano before playing his trade learning to play multiple musical instruments.

== Career ==
He heavily researched through online platforms to seek better career prospects by venturing into musical arena and explored about the possibilities of joining music-related courses. He eventually joined the Berklee College of Music in Boston and he also obtained his degree in Audio engineering in 2017. He worked his way out to explore any business roles that are incorporated within the musical field, as he had previously had the misconception that the only job role in which a person could interpret music was by way of becoming a music teacher. He attained the misconception back when he was studying at the high school, as most of the students were unaware of additional job roles attached to the music industry. After completing his higher studies, he collaborated with numerous studios and worked his way up to being an assistant, joining English musician Kid Harpoon, with whom he worked on several projects.

He became popular for his work as a sound engineer/mixer for American singer Miley Cyrus's award-winning chartbuster song Flowers which went onto garner over one billion streams on Spotify. Flowers eventually became the most streamed song of the year after its release in 2023. Flowers also went onto receive six nominations at the 2024 Grammys which also included 2 nominations for Brian Rajaratnam. Brian was eventually announced as the winner in the Best Engineer/Mixer category after having collaborated with Miley Cyrus for the production of the single Flowers.

== Selected discography ==
- 2021: Heat Above – recording assistant
- 2022: Minions: The Rise of Gru – recording engineer
- 2022: The End, So Far – assistant engineer
- 2022: Takin' It Back – engineering
- 2022: Endless Summer Vacation – engineering
- 2023: Life Is But a Dream... – recording assistant
- 2024: Can We Please Have Fun – recording engineer
- 2025: Open Wide (album) – recording engineer
- 2025: Who Is the Sky? – recording engineer
- 2026: Aperture (song) – recording engineer
- 2026: Kiss All the Time. Disco, Occasionally - engineering
