= Satellite (Harry Styles song) =

Single by Harry Styles

from the album Harry's House
- Released: 3 May 2023
- Studio: The Cave (Los Angeles); Angelic (Halse); Henson (Los Angeles)
- Genre: Synth-pop
- Length: 3:38
- Label: Erskine; Columbia
- Songwriters: Kid Harpoon; Tyler Johnson; Harry Styles
- Producers: Kid Harpoon; Tyler Johnson

Harry Styles singles chronology
"Music for a Sushi Restaurant" (2022)	"Satellite" (2023)	"Aperture" (2026)

Music video
- "Satellite" on YouTube

"Satellite" is a song by English singer-songwriter Harry Styles from his third studio album, Harry's House. It was released as the fourth single from the album through Erskine Records and Columbia Records, alongside a music video on 3 May 2023. It was written by Styles, Kid Harpoon, and Tyler Johnson, the latter two whom also produced the track.

== Music video ==
On 30 April 2023, Styles released a trio of posters announcing the release of the music video for the track, styled with the tagline "Spinning out waiting for ya", and focused on shots of a small robot. The music video, directed by Aube Perrie, features a vacuum cleaner called "Stomper" (coined after Styles' 'Satellite Stomps' performed as part of Love On Tour) that works at Styles' concert at The Kia Forum in Inglewood, California. The video begins with Stomper watching a film narrated by actor Brian Cox about the loneliness of the Mars rover Curiosity. After cleaning around backstage and watching Styles and his band get ready, Stomper sneaks onto the stage while Styles is singing in an effort to be closer to him, and is removed from the stage by a security guard. After leaving the venue, Stomper then traverses through snow, parts of the Grand Canyon National Park, over Monument Valley, and desolate Los Angeles while thinking about Curiosity. The video ends with Stomper reuniting with Styles stargazing on a field together - as Stomper begins to shut down and his battery dies, they are revealed to be in front of NASA's Vehicle Assembly Building.

This marked the second directorial collaboration between Styles and Perrie, who also directed the music video for another Harry's House single, "Music for a Sushi Restaurant". The music video received comparisons to the Pixar movie WALL-E. After the video release, the official Twitter account for the Mars rover Curiosity referenced Styles' concept, stating they were "Honored to be an inspiration to robots everywhere" alongside a picture of the rover on Mars.

== Critical reception ==
Olivia Horn from Pitchfork compared the song to Ariana Grande's "NASA" and noted that "the back half of the song builds momentum and nearly careens out of control." Michael Cragg of The Guardian wrote that the song "strut around shimmying melodies suddenly punctuated by stadium-ready crescendos". Rhian Daly of NME noted the song's scientific-fiction influence and said that the song makes "it feel as if you're floating through the milky way". Daly called the song "musically one of the most interesting songs Styles has made so far".

Lucy Ford of GQ praised the song's video, stating that "Never, in the history of love songs, have the jagged, cold edges of a vacuum cleaner been more clearly transformed into something quite so heartbreaking" while also noting that the video's concept elicits "free-flowing, ugly sobs we usually only expect around the annual John Lewis Christmas advert drop." Maureen Lee Lenker from Entertainment Weekly also supported the video, writing that "The story of search for connection in the universe and yearning for the person you're crushing on to take notice of you perfectly matches the lyrics to 'Satellite'."

== Charts ==
Weekly chart performance for "Satellite"
Chart (2022–2023)	Peak position
Australia (ARIA)	10
Austria (Ö3 Austria Top 40)	60
Canada Hot 100 (Billboard)	18
Canada CHR/Top 40 (Billboard)	47
Canada Hot AC (Billboard)	29
Czech Republic Singles Digital (ČNS IFPI)	31
France (SNEP)	179
Global 200 (Billboard)	18
Greece International (IFPI)	23
Iceland (Tónlistinn)	25
Ireland (IRMA)	6
Ireland Songs (Billboard)	11
Lithuania (AGATA)	20
Netherlands (Single Top 100)	49
New Zealand (Recorded Music NZ)	30
Norway (VG-lista)	34
Portugal (AFP)	21
San Marino (SMRRTV Top 50)	15
Slovakia Airplay (ČNS IFPI)	22
South Africa Streaming (TOSAC)	50
Sweden (Sverigetopplistan)	50
UK Singles (OCC)	18
US Billboard Hot 100	21
US Adult Pop Airplay (Billboard)	20
US Pop Airplay (Billboard)	26

== Certifications ==
Certifications for "Satellite"
Region	Certification	Certified units/sales
Australia (ARIA)	Platinum	70,000^{‡}
Brazil (Pro-Música Brasil)	3× Platinum	120,000^{‡}
Canada (Music Canada)	Platinum	80,000^{‡}
Italy (FIMI)	Gold	50,000^{‡}
New Zealand (RMNZ)	Platinum	30,000^{‡}
Poland (ZPAV)	Gold	25,000^{‡}
Portugal (AFP)	Gold	5,000^{‡}
Spain (Promusicae)	Gold	30,000^{‡}
United Kingdom (BPI)	Platinum	600,000^{‡}
United States (RIAA)	Platinum	1,000,000^{‡}
^{‡} Sales+streaming figures based on certification alone.

== Release history ==
"Satellite" release history
Region	Date	Format(s)	Label(s)	Ref.
Italy	5 May 2023	Radio airplay	Sony	
United States	16 May 2023	Contemporary hit radio	Columbia	
