= Taste Back =

2026 song by Harry Styles

Song by Harry Styles

from the album Kiss All the Time. Disco, Occasionally
- Released: 6 March 2026
- Recorded: 2024 – 25 June 2025
- Studio: Abbey Road (London); RAK (London); Hansa (Berlin)
- Genre: Synth-pop
- Length: 3:41
- Label: Erskine; Columbia
- Songwriters: Harry Styles; Thomas Hull; Tyler Johnson
- Producers: Kid Harpoon; Johnson

"Taste Back" is a song by English singer Harry Styles from his fourth studio album Kiss All the Time. Disco, Occasionally (2026). Styles wrote the song with its producers Kid Harpoon and Tyler Johnson.

== Composition ==
"Taste Back" is a synth-pop song. It has been compared to the styles of The 1975, the Postal Service and Wolfgang Amadeus Phoenix. The production consists of synths, electric guitars, and a drum machine. Lyrically, Harry Styles describes reconnecting with an old lover, with an overall message of needing love. The song also features backing vocals from singer Ellie Rowsell.

== Critical reception ==
The song received generally positive reviews. In a review of Kiss All the Time. Disco, Occasionally for Variety, Jem Aswad opined that it has one of the album's "sweetest melodies". John Earls of Classic Pop complimented the song's "nostalgic riff", considering it befitting of the lyrical content. Writing for NME, Rhian Daly described the song as "dreamy beauty". Clash's Robin Murray praised Ellie Rowsell's performance, writing that she "perfectly frames Harry's piquant vocal." Nicole Fell of The Hollywood Reporter considered the bridge to be a standout moment of the track and reacted favorably to the lyrics. Michael Savio of Slant Magazine commented the song "sounds like the Postal Service by way of the 1975 in the best possible way". In regard to the lyrics "Did you get your taste back? Or do you just need a little love?", Chris DeVille of Stereogum called it "an appropriate question for songs whose chic influences can't hide their underdeveloped writing." Lindsay Zoladz of The New York Times described the song's sound as "sonic sugar rush".

Alexis Petridis of The Guardian considered "Taste Back" to be among the "subtly lit" songs on the album that "pass by pleasantly enough, but don't really linger in your memory afterwards." Sowing of Sputnikmusic regarded the song as "very The 1975-forgotten-midtempo-deep-cut in that it does nothing wrong in particular, but fails to stick a landing in any sort of memorable way."

== Charts ==
Weekly chart performance
| Chart (2026) | Peak position |
|---|---|
| Australia (ARIA) | 12 |
| Canada Hot 100 (Billboard) | 19 |
| Global 200 (Billboard) | 15 |
| Greece International (IFPI) | 31 |
| New Zealand (Recorded Music NZ) | 14 |
| Norway (IFPI Norge) | 62 |
| Portugal (AFP) | 23 |
| Sweden (Sverigetopplistan) | 56 |
| UK Streaming (OCC) | 12 |
| US Billboard Hot 100 | 17 |

== Certifications ==
Certifications for "Taste Back"
| Region | Certification | Certified units/sales |
|---|---|---|
| United Kingdom (BPI) | Silver | 200,000^{‡} |
^{‡} Sales+streaming figures based on certification alone.
