= Erskine Records =

British record label founded by Harry Styles

Erskine Records Limited
- Founded: 2016
- Founder: Harry Styles
- Distributor: Columbia Records
- Country of origin: United Kingdom
- Location: London

Erskine Records Limited is a British record label founded by Harry Styles of One Direction, who is its sole owner. His assistant Emma Spring serves as a co-director.

== History ==
Before making his solo debut, Styles founded the record label Erskine Records. According to Companies House, Erskine Records was incorporated by Styles in May 2016. A month later, in June, it was announced that Styles had signed a contract with Columbia Records, which would subsequently distribute the label's releases. In September of the same year, his assistant Emma Spring was appointed as the company's secretary.

On 20 July 2023 it was announced that Mitch Rowland, collaborator and guitarist for Styles' band, would release his debut album Come June via Erskine and Giant Music. This marks the first record released on the Erskine Records imprinted from an act other than Styles.

In February 2026, Erskine Records Limited was listed on the Sunday Times Tax list with an estimated £24.7 million.

== Artists ==
- Harry Styles (founder)
- Mitch Rowland

== Discography ==
=== Studio albums ===
Harry Styles

- Harry Styles (2017)
- Fine Line (2019)
- Harry's House (2022)
- Kiss All the Time. Disco, Occasionally (2026)

Mitch Rowland

- Come June (Note: Unlike Harry Styles' releases which are distributed by Columbia Records, this release was distributed by Giant Music.) (2023)
- Whistling Pie (2025)

== See also ==
- List of record labels
