= List of Billboard Pop Airplay number-one songs of 2022 =

This is a list of songs which reached number one on the Billboard Pop Airplay (or Pop Songs) chart in 2022.

During 2022, a total of 18 singles hit number-one on the chart.

== Chart history ==
Key
†	Indicates best-performing song of 2022

Issue date	Song	Artist(s)	Ref.
January 1	"Easy on Me"	Adele	
January 8	"Easy on Me"	Adele	
January 15	"Easy on Me"	Adele	
January 22	"Easy on Me"	Adele	
January 29	"Heat Waves"	Glass Animals	
February 5	"Need to Know"	Doja Cat	
February 12	"Heat Waves"	Glass Animals	
February 19	"Thats What I Want"	Lil Nas X	
February 26	"Ghost"	Justin Bieber	
March 5	"ABCDEFU"	Gayle	
March 12	"ABCDEFU"	Gayle	
March 19	"Thats What I Want"	Lil Nas X	
March 26	"Thats What I Want"	Lil Nas X	
April 2	"Thats What I Want"	Lil Nas X	
April 9	"Woman"	Doja Cat	
April 16	"Woman"	Doja Cat	
April 23	"Big Energy"	Latto	
April 30	"Big Energy"	Latto	
May 7	"Enemy"	Imagine Dragons and JID	
May 14	"Big Energy"	Latto	
May 21	"As It Was" †	Harry Styles	
May 28	"As It Was" †	Harry Styles	
June 4	"As It Was" †	Harry Styles	
June 11	"As It Was" †	Harry Styles	
June 18	"As It Was" †	Harry Styles	
June 25	"As It Was" †	Harry Styles	
July 2	"As It Was" †	Harry Styles	
July 9	"About Damn Time"	Lizzo	
July 16	"About Damn Time"	Lizzo	
July 23	"About Damn Time"	Lizzo	
July 30	"About Damn Time"	Lizzo	
August 6	"About Damn Time"	Lizzo	
August 13	"About Damn Time"	Lizzo	
August 20	"About Damn Time"	Lizzo	
August 27	"Sunroof"	Nicky Youre and Dazy	
September 3	"Sunroof"	Nicky Youre and Dazy	
September 10	"Late Night Talking"	Harry Styles	
September 17	"Sunroof"	Nicky Youre and Dazy	
September 24	"Sunroof"	Nicky Youre and Dazy	
October 1	"I Like You (A Happier Song)"	Post Malone featuring Doja Cat	
October 8	"I Like You (A Happier Song)"	Post Malone featuring Doja Cat	
October 15	"I Like You (A Happier Song)"	Post Malone featuring Doja Cat	
October 22	"Vegas"	Doja Cat	
October 29	"Vegas"	Doja Cat	
November 5	"Vegas"	Doja Cat	
November 12	"Vegas"	Doja Cat	
November 19	"Bad Habit"	Steve Lacy	
November 26	"Unholy"	Sam Smith and Kim Petras	
December 3	"Unholy"	Sam Smith and Kim Petras	
December 10	"Unholy"	Sam Smith and Kim Petras	
December 17	"Unholy"	Sam Smith and Kim Petras	
December 24	"Anti-Hero"	Taylor Swift	
December 31	"Anti-Hero"	Taylor Swift	

== See also ==
- 2022 in American music
