= Schlager music =

Genre of popular music

Schlager
- Stylistic origins: Original: Pop; rock and roll; swing; country; folk; jazz; Subsequent: Pop; Europop; country; folk; rock
- Cultural origins: 1950s, West Germany, East Germany and Austria

Subgenres
- Dansband

Regional scenes
- Central Europe; Northern Europe; Southeast Europe

Other topics
- Music of Germany

Schlager (German: [ˈʃlaːɡɐ], "hit(s)") is a style of European popular music generally defined by catchy instrumental accompaniments to vocal pieces of pop music with simple, easygoing, and often sentimental lyrics.

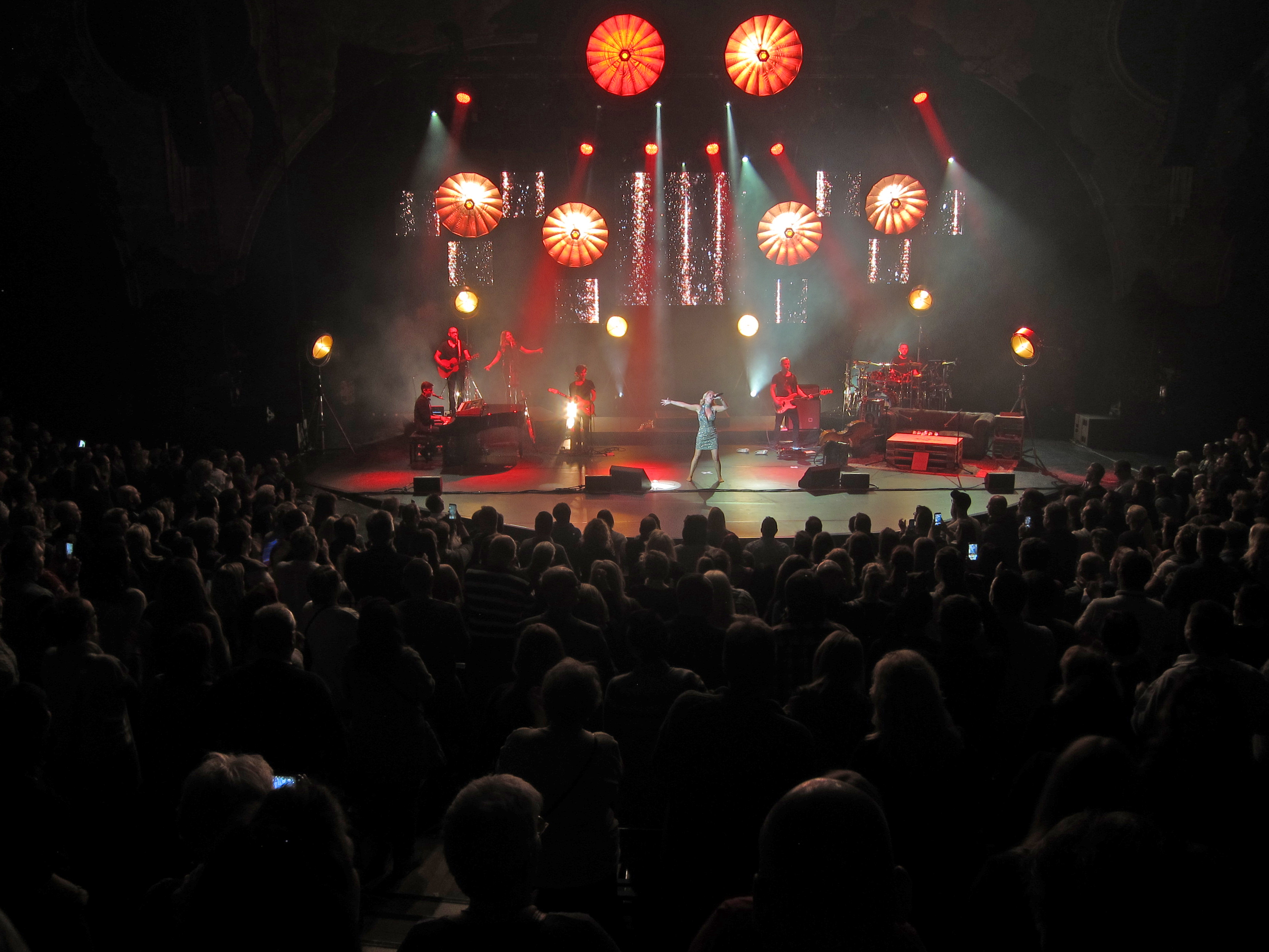
Michelle performing in Berlin, 15 March 2017, where she sang schlagers as well as ballads

Schlager tracks are typically light pop tunes or sweet, sentimental ballads with simple, catchy melodies. Their lyrics typically centre on love, relationships, and feelings. The northern variant of schlager (notably in Finland) has taken elements from Finnic, Nordic, Slavic, and Eastern European folk songs, with lyrics tending toward melancholic and elegiac themes. Musically, schlager bears similarities to styles such as easy listening.

The style was frequently represented in the early years of the Eurovision Song Contest but has since been replaced by other pop music styles.

== Etymology ==
Schlager is a loanword from German (from schlagen 'to hit'). It also came into some other languages (such as Bulgarian, Danish, Norwegian, Swedish, Dutch, Czech, Croatian, Finnish, Hungarian, Lithuanian, Latvian, Estonian, Serbian, Turkish, Russian, Hebrew, and Romanian), where it retained its meaning of a "(musical) hit".

== Central Europe ==
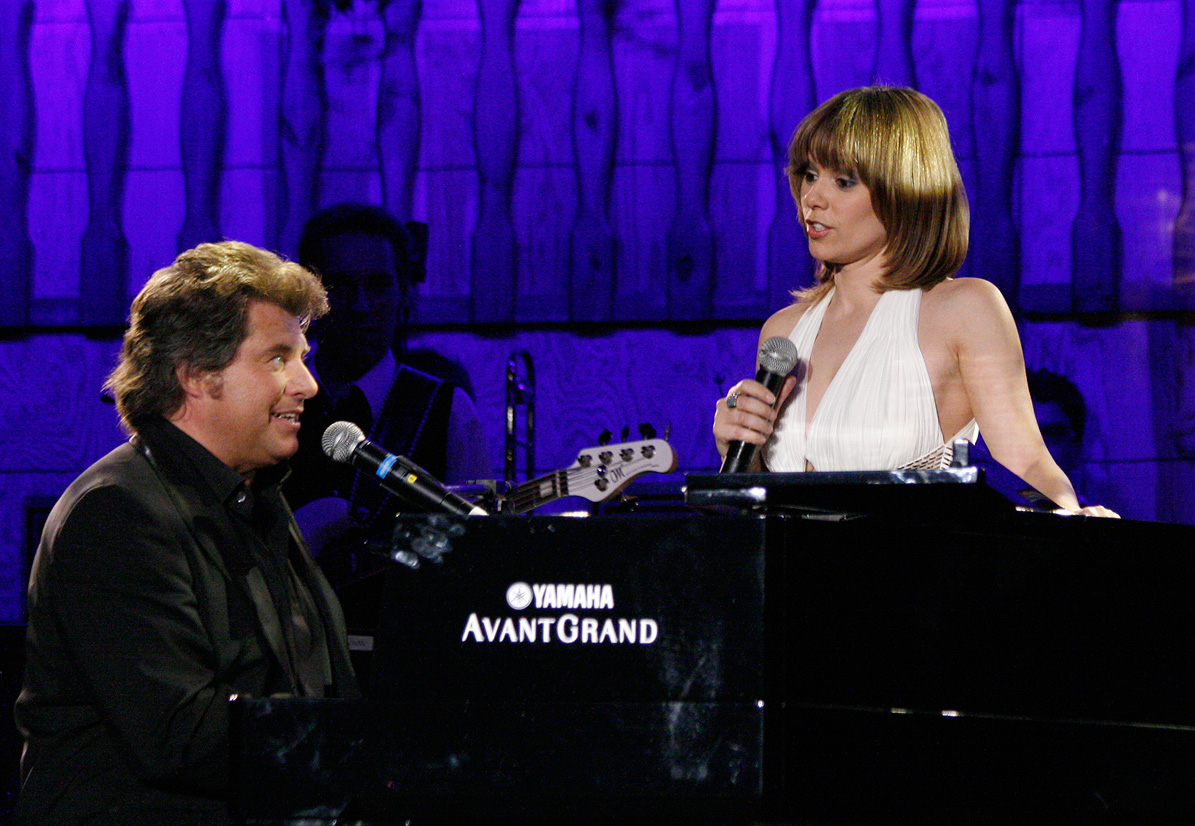
Austrian singer and presenter Andy Borg and Swiss singer Francine Jordi

The roots of German schlager are old. Originally, the word meant a hit or a strike. The first use of the word applied to music, in its original meaning, was in an opening night critique in the newspaper Wiener Fremden-Blatt on 17 February 1867 about The Blue Danube by Johann Strauss II.

One ancestor of schlager music in its current meaning may be the operetta, which was highly popular in the early twentieth century. In the 1920s and 1930s, the Comedian Harmonists and Rudi Schuricke laid the foundations for this new music. Well-known schlager singers of the 1940s, 50s and early 60s include Lale Andersen, Freddy Quinn, Ivo Robić, Gerhard Wendland, Caterina Valente, Margot Eskens and Conny Froboess. Schlager reached a peak of popularity in Germany and Austria in the 1960s (featuring Peter Alexander and Roy Black) and the early 1970s. From the mid-1990s through the early 2000s, schlager also saw an extensive revival in Germany by, for example, Guildo Horn, Dieter Thomas Kuhn, Michelle, and Petra Perle. Dance clubs would play a stretch of schlager titles during the course of an evening, and numerous new bands were formed specialising in 1970s schlager cover versions and newer material.

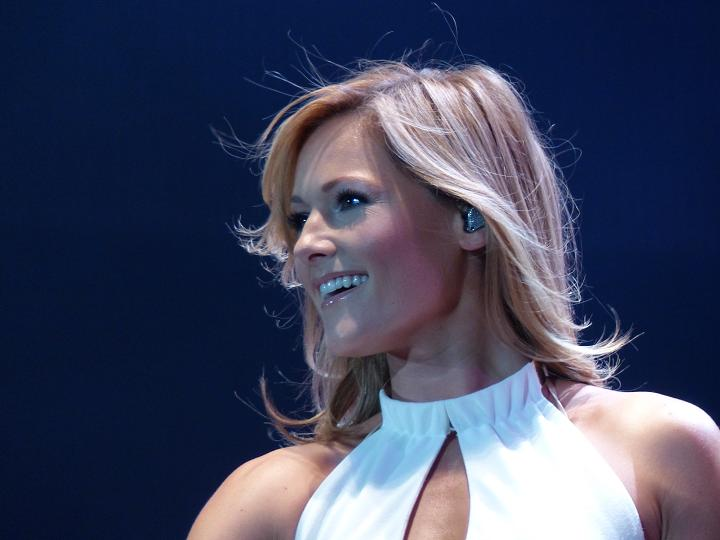
German artist Helene Fischer

Some Germans view schlager as their country music, and American country and Tex-Mex music are both major elements in schlager culture. ("Is This the Way to Amarillo" is regularly played in schlager contexts, usually in the English-language original.)

Between 1975 and 1981, German-style schlager became disco-oriented, in many ways merging with the mainstream disco music of the time. Singers such as Marianne Rosenberg recorded both schlager and disco hits. The song "Moskau" by German band Dschinghis Khan was one of the earliest modern, dance-based schlager, again showing how schlager of the 1970s and early 1980s merged with mainstream disco and Euro-disco. Dschinghis Khan, while primarily a Euro-disco band, also played disco-influenced schlager.

Popular schlager singers include Michael Holm, Roland Kaiser, Hansi Hinterseer, Jürgen Drews, Andrea Berg, Heintje Simons, Helene Fischer, Nicole, Claudia Jung, Andrea Jürgens, Michelle, Kristina Bach, Marianne Rosenberg, Simone Stelzer, Daniela Alfinito, Semino Rossi, Vicky Leandros, Leonard, DJ Ötzi, Andreas Gabalier and more recently, Beatrice Egli and Thomas Anders.

In Hamburg in the 2010s, Schlager fans still gathered annually by the hundreds of thousands, dressing in 1970s clothing for street parades called "Schlager Move". The Schlager Move designation is also used for a number of smaller schlager music parties in several major German cities throughout the year. (This revival is sometimes associated with kitsch and camp.) In the meantime, private radio has brought Schlager back to the radio. Schlager Radio is a station that broadcasts its program terrestrially in Germany via transmission towers on both FM and DAB+.

Stylistically, schlager continues to influence German "party pop" or "party-schlager" (e.g. "Layla", 2022): that is, music most often heard in après-ski bars and Mallorcan mass discos. Contemporary schlager is often mingled with Volkstümliche Musik. If it is not part of an ironic kitsch revival, a taste for both styles of music is commonly associated with folksy pubs, fun fairs, and bowling league venues. In the English-speaking world, the most popular group to have included elements of schlager in their style is probably ABBA, a band that mixed traditional Swedish music, schlager, and pop-rock to create their own sound.

== See also ==
- Schlager and Volksmusik
- Estrada (music genre)
- Iskelmä in Finnish
- Levenslied, similar genre in the Netherlands
- Pimba, similar genre in Portugal
- Traditional pop
- Middle of the road
- Adult contemporary music
- Dance-pop
