= Stay Alive (song) =

2022 digital single by Jungkook

Single by Jung Kook
- Language: Korean
- Released: February 11, 2022
- Genre: Pop
- Length: 3:30
- Label: Big Hit
- Songwriters: Suga; El Capitxn; Maria Marcus; Louise Frick Sveen; Gabriel Brandes; Matt Thomson; Max Lynedoch Graham; Shin Won Park
- Producer: Suga

Jung Kook singles chronology
"My Time" (2020)	"Stay Alive" (2022)	"Left and Right" (2022)

Music video
- "Stay Alive" on YouTube

"Stay Alive" is a song recorded by Jung Kook of BTS as the original soundtrack for 7Fates:Chakho, a collaborative webtoon created by Hybe and Naver Webtoon. It was released as a stand-alone digital single on February 11, 2022, through Big Hit Music. A dramatic, slow-tempo pop ballad, the song was produced by BTS-bandmate Suga, who co-wrote it with El Capitxn, Maria Marcus, Louise Frick Sveen, Gabriel Brandes, Matt Thomson and Max Lynedoch Graham of Arcades, and Shin Won Park.

The single charted at number one in Malaysia, Singapore, and Vietnam, and in the top 10 in Hungary, India, Japan, and New Zealand. It earned Jung Kook his first entry on the Billboard Hot 100 as a soloist, at number 95, and on the Global 200 at number 13. The song is the first Korean soundtrack in history to debut on the Official Singles Chart in the United Kingdom.

== Music and lyrics ==
Musically, "Stay Alive" is a "dramatic" slow-tempo, "sweeping" pop ballad. Produced by Suga, the track's instrumentation features trademark elements of his production style, mixing "subtle guitar pluckings with a suave string section" for the intro, followed by "softly muted percussive elements" as the song's momentum builds, leading into a "slightly more explosive" though still subdued chorus.

During a live stream on V Live in March 2022, Suga revealed that he had created the beat and melody for "Stay Alive" a long time ago. Unsure of when it would be released, he continuously worked on the song, editing and changing things. He also confirmed it was what he had been seen working on during filming for In the Soop. Production duo Arcades, comprising Matt Thomson and Max Lynedoch Graham, who previously worked on songs for BTS' Map of the Soul: Persona (2019) and Map of the Soul: 7 (2020) albums, contributed the topline melody for the song, together with Gabriel Brandes. According to an interview with Tatler, Big Hit Music sent across Suga's instrumental with "a very brief indication of what it was for but nothing set in stone". Having "the freedom to explore melodies", they "tried to play on the existing sense of melancholy and drama" Suga had created "to find something that would complement it." Big Hit then "took all the parts [they] submitted...made a 'best of'" and added Jung Kook's vocals "to create what you hear now."

Suga began working on the lyrics for "Stay Alive" once a release date for the song was finalized. He came up with the lyrics during a flight to the United States—it was one of two songs he wrote while on the plane, the other being "Girl of My Dreams"—for BTS' Permission to Dance on Stage concerts in Los Angeles. Wanting to directly reference the webtoon, Suga read its synopsis and the first four chapters, reviewed some of the artwork sketches, and imagined the song as if it were a soundtrack for an animation while writing. The lyrics are a direct complement to the webtoon's storyline and the struggle of the main characters—seven boys—"as they try to survive in a vicious [corrupt] world" while having to "overcome numerous hardships and trials". The webtoon's central theme is fate, and the song's title is evocative of "the harsh fate the seven protagonists are destined to face and contains the message that the most important thing is to stay alive in this cruel world."

After returning to South Korea, following the end of BTS' concerts in LA, Jung Kook recorded the vocal track on his own, utilizing "self-harmonies and airy transitions" to emphasize the song's "heart wrenching" lyrics. He sent the recording to Suga, who was still in the US at the time. Though initially concerned about the key of the song when he wrote it, and whether the chorus and verses would be too high or too low, the producer liked Jung Kook's first take so much that he felt a second session was unnecessary and submitted it immediately after mixing. According to Suga, Jung Kook's ability to sing so well meant there was very little difficulty during the recording process.

== Background and release ==
In November 2021, during a corporate briefing livestream, Hybe Corporation publicized plans to expand its IP through the publishing of "original stories" featuring three of its boy groups in collaboration with Naver Webtoon and Wattpad in January 2022. The BTS-based webtoon, titled 7Fates:Chakho, was slated for release on January 15. Various promotional content was released in the weeks leading up to the webtoon's premiere, beginning on January 2. On January 5, Hybe shared a teaser photo announcing the upcoming release of an unnamed official soundtrack for the webtoon, produced by Suga with vocals by Jung Kook, through the 7Fates official Twitter account. No date for the soundtrack was given at that time. A domestic promotional event was held from January 15 to February 5 for Korean subscribers of the webtoon who purchased early access to its first three episodes. Three hundred winners received a special, limited edition CD format of the single.

A partial version of the song was released with the global premiere of the webtoon's fourth chapter on February 5, 2022, marking the first time that Webtoon used an OST as background music for all language releases of a comic. The single was released in full on February 11 as scheduled.

== Commercial performance ==
"Stay Alive" entered the week seven issue of South Korea's Gaon Digital Chart, for the period dated February 6–12, 2022, at number 80. It also entered the corresponding Download Chart issue for the same period at number two. The following week, the single peaked at number 68 on the Digital Chart, and made its debut on the Streaming Chart at number 91. It also charted on the K-pop Hot 100 at number 75. In Japan, the single debuted at number one on the Oricon Daily Digital Single chart issue for February 11, with 8,617 copies sold on its first day. It sold a further 3,188 copies the following day. The single remained in the top five of the daily ranking for February 13, going on to debut at number three on the Weekly Digital Single chart issue for the period dated February 7–13, with 12,990 copies in total sold during that time. It also debuted on the Billboard Japan Hot 100 at number 44, and the component Download Songs chart at number three, for the same period.

Jung Kook earned his first solo entry on the U.S. Billboard Hot 100 with "Stay Alive". The single debuted at number 95 on the chart issue postdated February 26, 2022, with 2.9 million cumulative streams and 14,900 downloads sold in its first week. He is the fourth member of BTS to chart as a solo artist on the Hot 100, while "Stay Alive" is the fifth solo song by a BTS member to enter the ranking. The single was the sixth best-selling in the country on the Digital Songs chart for the same period, and topped the World Digital Song Sales chart. Jung Kook additionally debuted on the Artist 100 at number 82. The single also charted in the United Kingdom, debuting at number 89 on the OCC's Official Singles Chart. It is the first Korean soundtrack in history to enter the ranking.

Globally, "Stay Alive" accumulated 25.7 million streams and sold 30,400 copies across various territories, earning Jung Kook his first solo top-ten entry on the Billboard Global Excl. U.S. chart at number eight. He is the fourth member of BTS to enter the global ranking and the highest-charting; bandmate V previously charted at number 43 with "Christmas Tree" in January. Following its debut week records, the single went on to become the fastest by a Korean male solo artist, and the fastest Korean OST, to achieve 30–100 million streams on Spotify, reaching the former in 10 days and the latter in 73 days of release.

== Music video ==
The music video for "Stay Alive" was preceded by the release of a 17-second long teaser clip shared across various social media platforms on January 31, 2022. It featured a partially-animated still from the comic of two of the main characters, Haru (Jimin's character) and Zeha (Jung Kook's character), accompanied by an audio excerpt of the song that revealed the lyric "Please you stay alive". The clip accumulated over 400,000 views upon release.

A theatrical, promotional music video was uploaded to the official 7Fates:Chako YouTube channel on February 11, 2022. Released together with the single, the video contains a mixture of animated scenes from the webtoon and live-action clips of all seven band members inspired by the webtoon. At a runtime of two-and-a-half minutes, the video's audio features a condensed version of the song, rather than the full three-minutes-and-thirty-seconds-long version.

== Charts ==
=== Weekly charts ===
Weekly chart performance
Chart (2022)	Peak position
Canada Hot 100 (Billboard)	74
Global 200 (Billboard)	13
Greece International (IFPI)	55
Hungary (Single Top 40)	5
India International Singles (IMI)	3
Japan (Japan Hot 100)	44
Japan Digital Singles (Oricon)	3
Malaysia (RIM)	1
New Zealand Hot Singles (RMNZ)	6
Philippines (Billboard)	18
Portugal (AFP)	102
Russia (Billboard)	8
Singapore (RIAS)	1
South Korea (Gaon)	68
South Korea (K-pop Hot 100)	75
Switzerland (Schweizer Hitparade)	79
Taiwan (Billboard)	20
UK Singles (Official Charts)	89
US Billboard Hot 100	95
US World Digital Song Sales (Billboard)	1
Vietnam (Vietnam Hot 100)	1

=== Year-end charts ===
Year-end chart performance
Chart (2022)	Position
Vietnam (Vietnam Hot 100)	97

== Release history ==
Region	Date	Format(s)	Label	Ref.
South Korea	February 11, 2022	Digital download; streaming	Big Hit Music	
Various	February 11, 2022	Digital download; streaming	Big Hit Music	
South Korea	February/March 2022	CD	Big Hit Music	
United States	April 2022	CD	Big Hit Music	

== See also ==
- List of songs produced by Suga
- List of number-one songs of 2022 (Malaysia)
- List of number-one songs of 2022 (Singapore)
