= List of number-one songs of 2022 (Malaysia) =

== RIM streaming charts ==
Below is a list of songs that topped the RIM Charts in 2022 according to the Recording Industry Association of Malaysia.

Starting the week ending 24 March 2022, the Top 20 International and Domestic Singles chart was reconfigured to be exclusively for International single releases, while the Top 10 Domestic Singles chart was reconfigured into a Malay songs chart. Also in the same week, the Top 10 Chinese Singles chart was introduced.

Issue Date	International & Domestic songs			Domestic songs		
Issue Date	Song	Artist(s)	Ref.	Song	Artist(s)	Ref.
6 January	"abcdefu"	Gayle		"Janji Manis"	Masdo	
13 January	"abcdefu"	Gayle		"Janji Manis"	Masdo	
20 January	"Angel Baby"	Troye Sivan		"Janji Manis"	Masdo	
27 January	"Angel Baby"	Troye Sivan		"Janji Manis"	Masdo	
3 February	"Angel Baby"	Troye Sivan		"虎年新年到"	Jestinna Kuan, Mskuan and Perry K	
10 February	"Angel Baby"	Troye Sivan		"Janji Manis"	Masdo	
17 February	"Stay Alive"	Jungkook		"Bad"	Dolla	
24 February	"Angel Baby"	Troye Sivan		"Sempurna"	Insomniacks	
3 March	"Angel Baby"	Troye Sivan		"Sempurna"	Insomniacks	
10 March	"Angel Baby"	Troye Sivan		"Sempurna"	Insomniacks	
17 March	"Angel Baby"	Troye Sivan		"Sempurna"	Insomniacks	

Issue Date	International songs			Malay songs			Chinese songs		
Issue Date	Song	Artist(s)	Ref.	Song	Artist(s)	Ref.	Song	Artist(s)	Ref.
24 March	"Ghost"	Justin Bieber		"Sempurna"	Insomniacks		"哪裡都是你"	隊長YoungCaptain	
31 March	"Ghost"	Justin Bieber		"Sempurna"	Insomniacks		"哪裡都是你"	隊長YoungCaptain	
7 April	"Still Life"	Big Bang		"Sempurna"	Insomniacks		"哪裡都是你"	隊長YoungCaptain	
14 April	"Still Life"	Big Bang		"Sempurna"	Insomniacks		"哪裡都是你"	隊長YoungCaptain	
21 April	"Angel Baby"	Troye Sivan		"Sempurna"	Insomniacks		"如果可以"	William Wei	
28 April	"Angel Baby"	Troye Sivan		"Suasana Di Hari Raya"	Anuar & Ellina		"如果可以"	William Wei	
5 May	"Angel Baby"	Troye Sivan		"Suasana Di Hari Raya"	Anuar & Ellina		"如果可以"	William Wei	
12 May	"As It Was"	Harry Styles		"Sempurna"	Insomniacks		"如果可以"	William Wei	
19 May	"Until I Found You"	Stephen Sanchez		"Sempurna"	Insomniacks		"如果可以"	William Wei	
26 May	"Until I Found You"	Stephen Sanchez		"Sempurna"	Insomniacks		"如果可以"	William Wei	
2 June	"Until I Found You"	Stephen Sanchez		"Sempurna"	Insomniacks		"愛你"	Cyndi Wang	
9 June	"Until I Found You"	Stephen Sanchez		"Sempurna"	Insomniacks		"如果可以"	William Wei	
16 June	"Glimpse of Us"	Joji		"Sempurna"	Insomniacks		"如果可以"	William Wei	
23 June	"Glimpse of Us"	Joji		"Sempurna"	Insomniacks		"如果可以"	William Wei	
30 June	"Glimpse of Us"	Joji		"Sempurna"	Insomniacks		"如果可以"	William Wei	
7 July	"Glimpse of Us"	Joji		"Casablanca"	Nuha Bahrin and Naufal Azrin		"如果可以"	William Wei	
14 July	"Glimpse of Us"	Joji		"Casablanca"	Nuha Bahrin and Naufal Azrin		"最偉大的作品" ("Greatest Works of Art")	Jay Chou	
21 July	"Glimpse of Us"	Joji		"Casablanca"	Nuha Bahrin and Naufal Azrin		"還在流浪" ("Still Wandering")	Jay Chou	
28 July	"Glimpse of Us"	Joji		"Casablanca"	Nuha Bahrin and Naufal Azrin		"還在流浪" ("Still Wandering")	Jay Chou	
4 August	"Glimpse of Us"	Joji		"Casablanca"	Nuha Bahrin and Naufal Azrin		"還在流浪" ("Still Wandering")	Jay Chou	
11 August	"Glimpse of Us"	Joji		"Casablanca"	Nuha Bahrin and Naufal Azrin		"還在流浪" ("Still Wandering")	Jay Chou	
18 August	"Glimpse of Us"	Joji		"Casablanca"	Nuha Bahrin and Naufal Azrin		"還在流浪" ("Still Wandering")	Jay Chou	
25 August	"Glimpse of Us"	Joji		"Casablanca"	Nuha Bahrin and Naufal Azrin		"如果可以"	William Wei	
1 September	"Glimpse of Us"	Joji		"Sempurna"	Insomniacks		"如果可以"	William Wei	
8 September	"Glimpse of Us"	Joji		"Satu Malam Di Temasek"	Joe Flizzow featuring Sonaone		"如果可以"	William Wei	
15 September	"Glimpse of Us"	Joji		"Satu Malam Di Temasek"	Joe Flizzow featuring Sonaone		"如果可以"	William Wei	
22 September	"Glimpse of Us"	Joji		"Satu Malam Di Temasek"	Joe Flizzow featuring Sonaone		"诀爱" ("Parting Love")	Faye Chan	
29 September	"Glimpse of Us"	Joji		"Satu Malam Di Temasek"	Joe Flizzow featuring Sonaone		"如果可以"	William Wei	
6 October	"Unholy"	Sam Smith and Kim Petras		"Satu Malam Di Temasek"	Joe Flizzow featuring Sonaone		"诀爱" ("Parting Love")	Faye Chan	
13 October	"Unholy"	Sam Smith and Kim Petras		"Satu Malam Di Temasek"	Joe Flizzow featuring Sonaone		"如果可以"	William Wei	
20 October	"Unholy"	Sam Smith and Kim Petras		"Satu Malam Di Temasek"	Joe Flizzow featuring Sonaone		"诀爱" ("Parting Love")	Faye Chan	
27 October	"Anti-Hero"	Taylor Swift		"Satu Malam Di Temasek"	Joe Flizzow featuring Sonaone		"诀爱" ("Parting Love")	Faye Chan	
3 November	"Anti-Hero"	Taylor Swift		"Swipe"	Alyph		"如果可以"	William Wei	
10 November	"Die for You"	Joji		"Sayunk I Love You"	Chombi		"如果可以"	William Wei	
17 November	"Die for You"	Joji		"Sayunk I Love You"	Chombi		"如果可以"	William Wei	
24 November	"Die for You"	Joji		"Sayunk I Love You"	Chombi		"如果可以"	William Wei	
1 December	"Here with Me"	d4vd		"Sayunk I Love You"	Chombi		"如果可以"	William Wei	
8 December	Creepin'	Metro Boomin, The Weeknd and 21 Savage		"Sayunk I Love You"	Chombi		"如果可以"	William Wei	
15 December	"Until I Found You"	Stephen Sanchez		"Sayunk I Love You"	Chombi		"如果可以"	William Wei	
22 December	"Kill Bill"	SZA		"Sayunk I Love You"	Chombi		"如果可以"	William Wei	
29 December	"Kill Bill"	SZA		"Sayunk I Love You"	Chombi		"如果可以"	William Wei	

== Billboard Malaysia Songs ==
Malaysia Songs is a record chart in Malaysia for songs, compiled by Billboard since February 2022. The chart is updated every Tuesday on Billboard's website. The chart was announced on 14 February 2022 as part of Billboard's Hits of the World chart collection, ranking the top 25 songs weekly in more than 40 countries around the globe.

The chart tracks songs' performance from Friday to Thursday. Chart rankings are based on digital downloads from full-service digital music retailers (sales from direct-to-consumer sites such as an individual artist's store are excluded) and online streaming occurring in Malaysia during the tracking period. All data are provided by MRC Data.

Issue date	Song	Artist(s)	Ref.
19 February	"Angel Baby"	Troye Sivan	
26 February	"Angel Baby"	Troye Sivan	
5 March	"Jikjin"	Treasure	
12 March	"Angel Baby"	Troye Sivan	
19 March	"Darari"	Treasure	
26 March	"Darari"	Treasure	
2 April	"Ghost"	Justin Bieber	
9 April	"Ghost"	Justin Bieber	
16 April	"Still Life"	Big Bang	
23 April	"Still Life"	Big Bang	
30 April	"Angel Baby"	Troye Sivan	
7 May	"Angel Baby"	Troye Sivan	
14 May	"Angel Baby"	Troye Sivan	
21 May	"Angel Baby"	Troye Sivan	
28 May	"Angel Baby"	Troye Sivan	
4 June	"As It Was"	Harry Styles	
11 June	"Until I Found You"	Stephen Sanchez	
18 June	"Until I Found You"	Stephen Sanchez	
25 June	"Glimpse of Us"	Joji	
2 July	"Glimpse of Us"	Joji	
9 July	"Glimpse of Us"	Joji	
16 July	"Glimpse of Us"	Joji	
23 July	"Glimpse of Us"	Joji	
30 July	"Glimpse of Us"	Joji	
6 August	"Glimpse of Us"	Joji	
13 August	"Glimpse of Us"	Joji	
20 August	"Glimpse of Us"	Joji	
27 August	"Glimpse of Us"	Joji	
3 September	"Pink Venom"	Blackpink	
10 September	"Pink Venom"	Blackpink	
17 September	"Pink Venom"	Blackpink	
24 September	"Pink Venom"	Blackpink	
1 October	"Shut Down"	Blackpink	
8 October	"Shut Down"	Blackpink	
15 October	"Shut Down"	Blackpink	
22 October	"Shut Down"	Blackpink	
29 October	"Shut Down"	Blackpink	
5 November	"Anti-Hero"	Taylor Swift	
12 November	"Swipe"	ALYPH	
19 November	"Die for You"	Joji	
26 November	"Die for You"	Joji	
3 December	"Golden Hour"	JVKE	
10 December	"Golden Hour"	JVKE	
17 December	"Creepin'"	Metro Boomin, The Weeknd and 21 Savage	
24 December	Kill Bill"	SZA	
31 December	Kill Bill"	SZA	
