= List of number-one hits of 2022 (Switzerland) =

This is a list of the Swiss Hitparade number-one hits of 2022.

== Swiss charts ==
| Issue date | Song | Artist | Album | Artist |
|---|---|---|---|---|
| 2 January | "All I Want for Christmas Is You" | Mariah Carey | 30 | Adele |
| 9 January | "Pepas" | Farruko | 30 | Adele |
| 16 January | "ABCDEFU" | Gayle | Dawn FM | The Weeknd |
| 23 January | "ABCDEFU" | Gayle | Stories of the XXI | Bastian Baker |
| 30 January | "ABCDEFU" | Gayle | Crisis of Faith | Billy Talent |
| 6 February | "ABCDEFU" | Gayle | Zrügg uf Fäud 1 | Volxrox |
| 13 February | "Brividi" | Mahmood and Blanco | V | Vald |
| 20 February | "ABCDEFU" | Gayle | MTV Unplugged Tonbildshow | Patent Ochsner |
| 27 February | "ABCDEFU" | Gayle | MTV Unplugged Tonbildshow | Patent Ochsner |
| 6 March | "Heat Waves" | Glass Animals | MTV Unplugged Tonbildshow | Patent Ochsner |
| 13 March | "Heat Waves" | Glass Animals | Multitude | Stromae |
| 20 March | "Heat Waves" | Glass Animals | MTV Unplugged Tonbildshow | Patent Ochsner |
| 27 March | "Heat Waves" | Glass Animals | Felsafescht | Megawatt |
| 3 April | "Heat Waves" | Glass Animals | Never Let Me Go | Placebo |
| 10 April | "As It Was" | Harry Styles | Unlimited Love | Red Hot Chili Peppers |
| 17 April | "As It Was" | Harry Styles | Hecht for Life | Hecht |
| 24 April | "As It Was" | Harry Styles | MTV Unplugged Tonbildshow | Patent Ochsner |
| 1 May | "As It Was" | Harry Styles | 30 Jahre: Typisch Marc Pircher | Marc Pircher |
| 8 May | "Beautiful Girl" | Luciano | Zeit | Rammstein |
| 15 May | "Beautiful Girl" | Luciano | Zeit | Rammstein |
| 22 May | "Beautiful Girl" | Luciano | Sommersterne | Calimeros |
| 29 May | "As It Was" | Harry Styles | Harry's House | Harry Styles |
| 5 June | "As It Was" | Harry Styles | Alles aus Liebe: 40 Jahre Die Toten Hosen | Die Toten Hosen |
| 12 June | "Running Up That Hill" | Kate Bush | Zeit | Rammstein |
| 19 June | "As It Was" | Harry Styles | Proof | BTS |
| 26 June | "As It Was" | Harry Styles | Honestly, Nevermind | Drake |
| 3 July | "Motivé" | Xen and EAZ | Closure/Continuation | Porcupine Tree |
| 10 July | "As It Was" | Harry Styles | Mercury – Acts 1 & 2 | Imagine Dragons |
| 17 July | "As It Was" | Harry Styles | Mercury – Acts 1 & 2 | Imagine Dragons |
| 24 July | "Layla" | DJ Robin & Schürze | Deutschrap brandneu | Farid Bang and Capital Bra |
| 31 July | "Layla" | DJ Robin & Schürze | Hoodie Gääggeler | Stubete Gäng |
| 7 August | "Layla" | DJ Robin & Schürze | Freiheit | Heimweh |
| 14 August | "Layla" | DJ Robin & Schürze | Freundschaft aus Gold | Kastelruther Spatzen |
| 21 August | "As It Was" | Harry Styles | Deceivers | Arch Enemy |
| 28 August | "As It Was" | Harry Styles | AfterLife | Five Finger Death Punch |
| 4 September | "Calm Down" | Rema | Will of the People | Muse |
| 11 September | "I'm Good (Blue)" | David Guetta and Bebe Rexha | Finale | Blay |
| 18 September | "I'm Good (Blue)" | David Guetta and Bebe Rexha | Live im Letzigrund 2022 | Gölä and Trauffer |
| 25 September | "I'm Good (Blue)" | David Guetta and Bebe Rexha | Battito Infinito | Eros Ramazzotti |
| 2 October | "Bamba" | Luciano featuring Aitch and Bia | 11 | Schwiizergoofe |
| 9 October | "Bamba" | Luciano featuring Aitch and Bia | The End, So Far | Slipknot |
| 16 October | "I'm Good (Blue)" | David Guetta and Bebe Rexha | Frei | Vincent Gross |
| 23 October | "I'm Good (Blue)" | David Guetta and Bebe Rexha | Return of the Dream Canteen | Red Hot Chili Peppers |
| 30 October | "I'm Good (Blue)" | David Guetta and Bebe Rexha | Midnights | Taylor Swift |
| 6 November | "Lift Me Up" | Rihanna | Glöggelä | Trauffer |
| 13 November | "I'm Good (Blue)" | David Guetta and Bebe Rexha | Her Loss | Drake and 21 Savage |
| 20 November | "I'm Good (Blue)" | David Guetta and Bebe Rexha | Only the Strong Survive | Bruce Springsteen |
| 27 November | "I'm Good (Blue)" | David Guetta and Bebe Rexha | Get Rollin' | Nickelback |
| 4 December | "I'm Good (Blue)" | David Guetta and Bebe Rexha | L'Emprise | Mylène Farmer |
| 11 December | "All I Want for Christmas Is You" | Mariah Carey | Heroes & Villains | Metro Boomin |
| 18 December | "All I Want for Christmas Is You" | Mariah Carey | Paul | Sido |
| 25 December | "All I Want for Christmas Is You" | Mariah Carey | Heebie Jeebies – The Early Songs of Johnny Copeland | Philipp Fankhauser |
