= List of number-one songs of 2022 (Singapore) =

This is a list of the Singapore Top 30 Digital Streaming number-one songs in 2022, according to the Recording Industry Association Singapore.

== Chart history ==
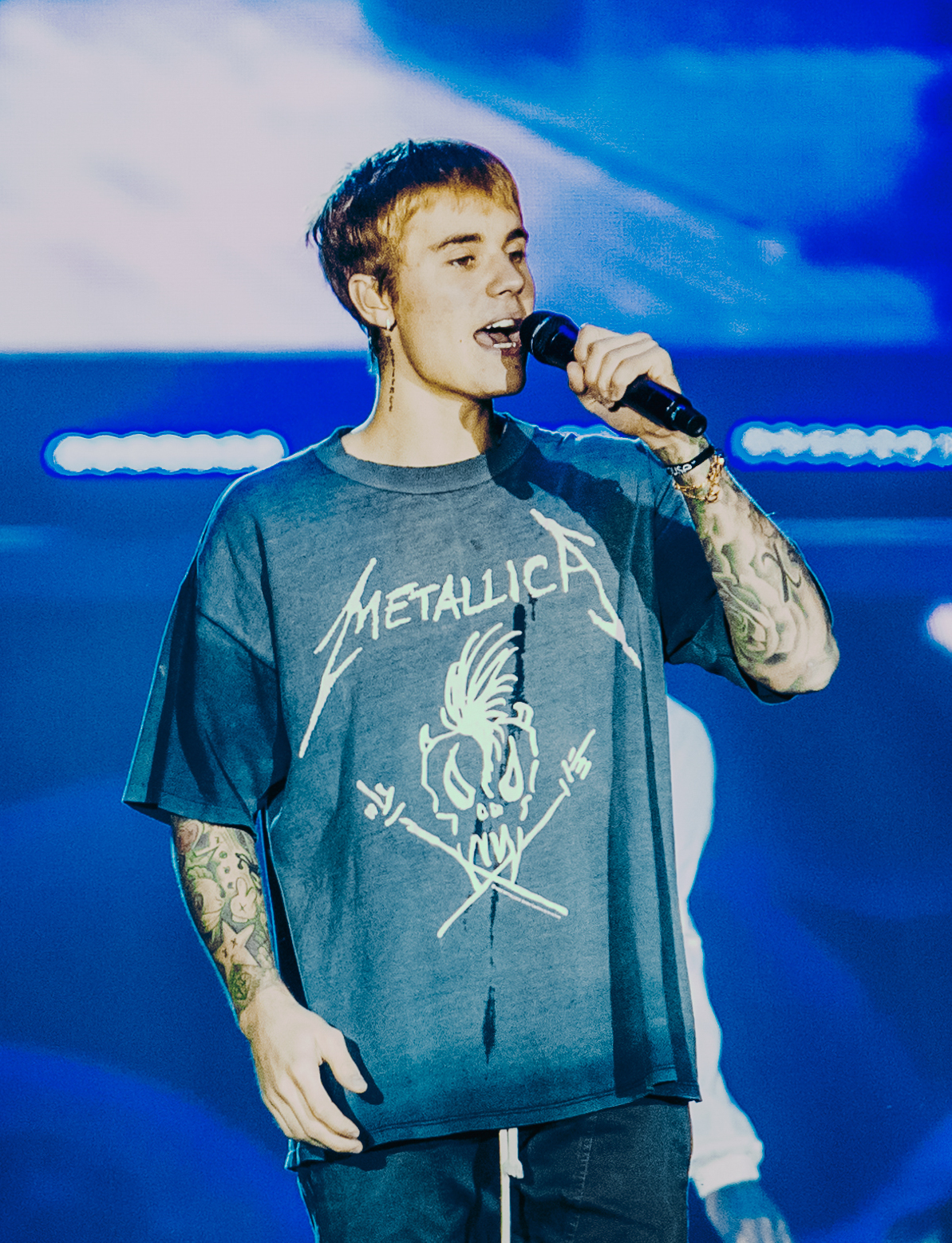
Justin Bieber topped the chart for 11 weeks with "Ghost", the longest-running number-one song of the year.

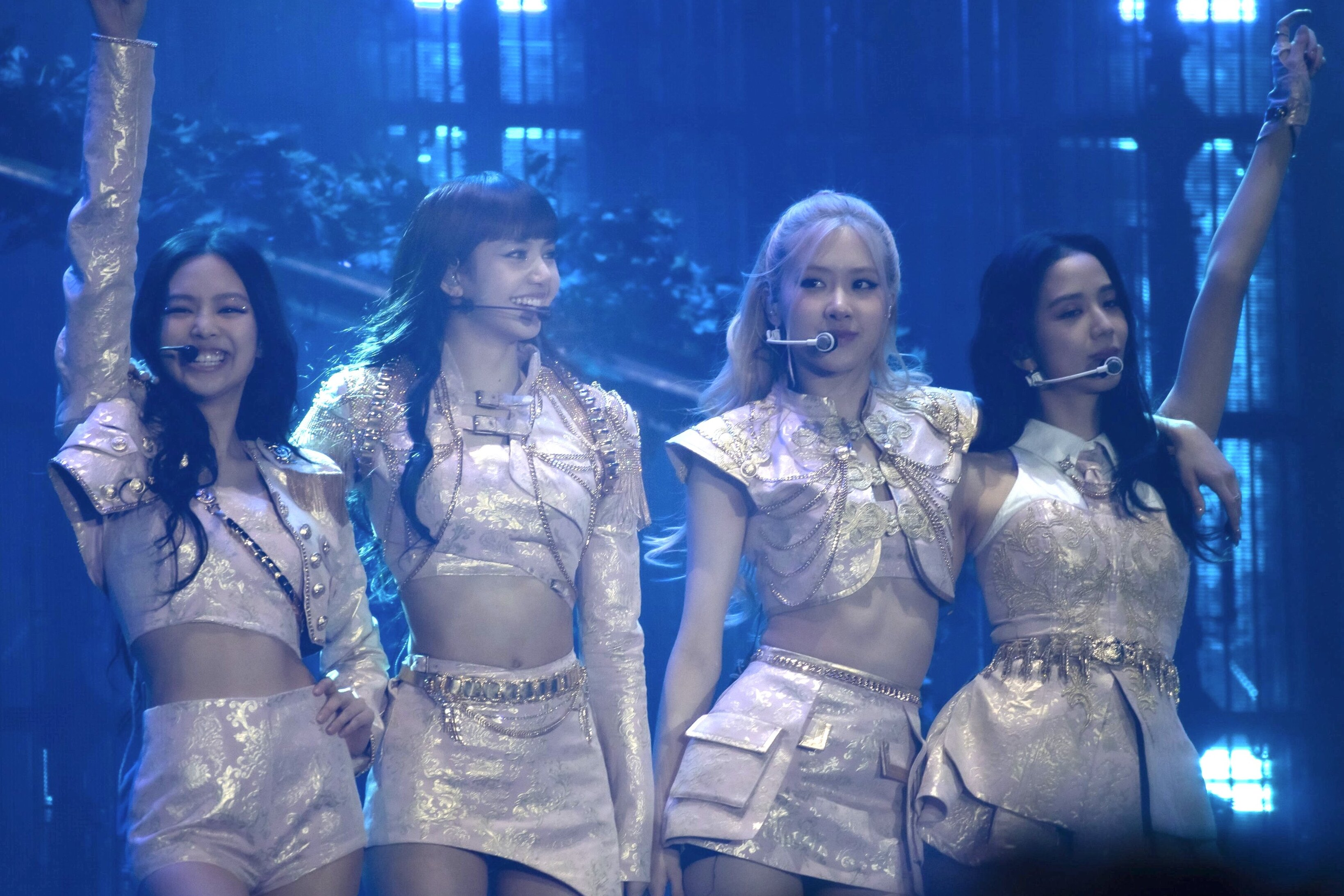
Blackpink earned the most number-one songs by any artist in 2022, topping the chart for 7 weeks with "Pink Venom" and "Shut Down".

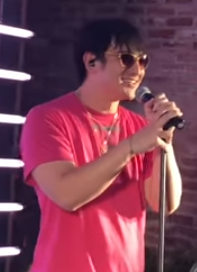
Joji topped the chart for 10 weeks with "Glimpse of Us".

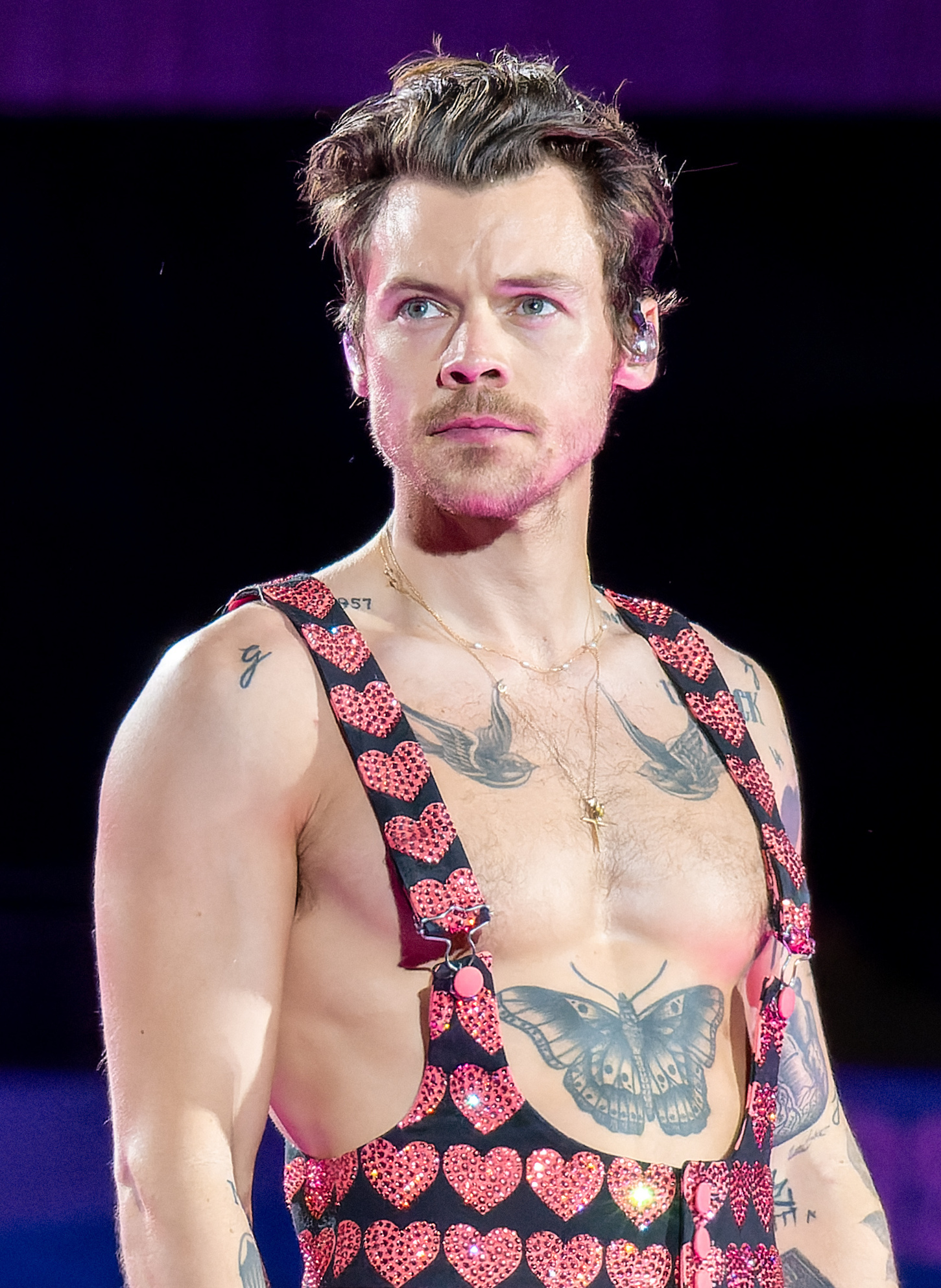
Harry Styles topped the chart for 9 weeks with "As It Was".

| Issue Date | Song | Artist(s) | Ref. |
|---|---|---|---|
| 6 January | "Ghost" | Justin Bieber | |
| 13 January | "Ghost" | Justin Bieber | |
| 20 January | "Ghost" | Justin Bieber | |
| 27 January | "Light Switch" | Charlie Puth | |
| 3 February | "Ghost" | Justin Bieber | |
| 10 February | "Ghost" | Justin Bieber | |
| 17 February | "Stay Alive" | Jungkook | |
| 24 February | "Ghost" | Justin Bieber | |
| 3 March | "Ghost" | Justin Bieber | |
| 10 March | "Ghost" | Justin Bieber | |
| 17 March | "Ghost" | Justin Bieber | |
| 24 March | "Ghost" | Justin Bieber | |
| 31 March | "Ghost" | Justin Bieber | |
| 7 April | "Still Life" | BigBang | |
| 14 April | "As It Was" | Harry Styles | |
| 21 April | "As It Was" | Harry Styles | |
| 28 April | "As It Was" | Harry Styles | |
| 5 May | "As It Was" | Harry Styles | |
| 12 May | "As It Was" | Harry Styles | |
| 19 May | "As It Was" | Harry Styles | |
| 26 May | "As It Was" | Harry Styles | |
| 2 June | "As It Was" | Harry Styles | |
| 9 June | "As It Was" | Harry Styles | |
| 16 June | "Glimpse of Us" | Joji | |
| 23 June | "Glimpse of Us" | Joji | |
| 30 June | "Glimpse of Us" | Joji | |
| 7 July | "Glimpse of Us" | Joji | |
| 14 July | "Glimpse of Us" | Joji | |
| 21 July | "Glimpse of Us" | Joji | |
| 28 July | "Glimpse of Us" | Joji | |
| 4 August | "Glimpse of Us" | Joji | |
| 11 August | "Glimpse of Us" | Joji | |
| 18 August | "Glimpse of Us" | Joji | |
| 25 August | "Pink Venom" | Blackpink | |
| 1 September | "Pink Venom" | Blackpink | |
| 8 September | "Pink Venom" | Blackpink | |
| 15 September | "Pink Venom" | Blackpink | |
| 22 September | "Shut Down" | Blackpink | |
| 29 September | "Shut Down" | Blackpink | |
| 6 October | "Shut Down" | Blackpink | |
| 13 October | "Unholy" | Sam Smith and Kim Petras | |
| 20 October | "Unholy" | Sam Smith and Kim Petras | |
| 27 October | "Anti-Hero" | Taylor Swift | |
| 3 November | "Anti-Hero" | Taylor Swift | |
| 10 November | "Anti-Hero" | Taylor Swift | |
| 17 November | "Anti-Hero" | Taylor Swift | |
| 24 November | "Anti-Hero" | Taylor Swift | |
| 1 December | "Anti-Hero" | Taylor Swift | |
| 8 December | "Creepin'" | Metro Boomin, the Weeknd and 21 Savage | |
| 15 December | "Kill Bill" | SZA | |
| 22 December | "Kill Bill" | SZA | |
| 29 December | "Ditto" | NewJeans | |

== Number-one artists ==
List of number-one artists by total weeks at number one
| Position | Artist | Weeks at No. 1 |
|---|---|---|
| 1 | Justin Bieber | 11 |
| 2 | Joji | 10 |
| 3 | Harry Styles | 9 |
| 4 | Blackpink | 7 |
| 5 | Taylor Swift | 6 |
| 6 | Sam Smith | 2 |
| 6 | Kim Petras | 2 |
| 7 | Charlie Puth | 1 |
| 7 | Jungkook | 1 |
| 7 | BigBang | 1 |
| 7 | Metro Boomin | 1 |
| 7 | The Weeknd | 1 |
| 7 | 21 Savage | 1 |
