= List of number-one hits of 2022 (Austria) =

This is a list of the Austrian number-one singles and albums of 2022 as compiled by Ö3 Austria Top 40, the official chart provider of Austria.

Issue date	Song	Artist	Album	Artist
4 January	"Last Christmas"	Wham!	Voyage	ABBA
11 January	"ABCDEFU"	Gayle	30	Adele
18 January	"ABCDEFU"	Gayle	Löwenmut	Daniela Alfinito
25 January	"ABCDEFU"	Gayle	Neujahrskonzert 2022 – New Year's Concert	Wiener Philharmoniker/Daniel Barenboim
1 February	"ABCDEFU"	Gayle	Ich will dich	Nockalm Quintett
8 February	"ABCDEFU"	Gayle	Fein	Edmund
15 February	"ABCDEFU"	Gayle	The Sound of Musik	Falco
22 February	"ABCDEFU"	Gayle	Pussy Power	Katja Krasavice
1 March	"ABCDEFU"	Gayle	Lieder unseres Lebens	Fantasy
8 March	"ABCDEFU"	Gayle	Alles war schön und nichts tat weh	Casper
15 March	"Sehnsucht"	Miksu, Macloud and T-Low	The War to End All Wars	Sabaton
22 March	"Sehnsucht"	Miksu, Macloud and T-Low	Impera	Ghost
29 March	"Sehnsucht"	Miksu, Macloud and T-Low	Heute hab ich Zeit für dich	Semino Rossi
5 April	"Criminal"	Jala Brat, Buba Corelli and RAF Camora	Never Let Me Go	Placebo
12 April	"As It Was"	Harry Styles	Unlimited Love	Red Hot Chili Peppers
19 April	"As It Was"	Harry Styles	Unlimited Love	Red Hot Chili Peppers
26 April	"As It Was"	Harry Styles	Unlimited Love	Red Hot Chili Peppers
3 May	"We Made It"	Miksu, Macloud and T-Low	Unlimited Love	Red Hot Chili Peppers
10 May	"Beautiful Girl"	Luciano	Zeit	Rammstein
17 May	"Beautiful Girl"	Luciano	Zeit	Rammstein
24 May	"Beautiful Girl"	Luciano	Zeit	Rammstein
31 May	"Beautiful Girl"	Luciano	Harry's House	Harry Styles
7 June	"Beautiful Girl"	Luciano	Zeit	Rammstein
14 June	"Beautiful Girl"	Luciano	Zeit	Rammstein
21 June	"Beautiful Girl"	Luciano	Proof	BTS
28 June	"Beautiful Girl"	Luciano	Ein neuer Anfang	Andreas Gabalier
5 July	"Layla"	DJ Robin and Schürze	Zeit	Rammstein
12 July	"Layla"	DJ Robin and Schürze	Zeit	Rammstein
19 July	"Layla"	DJ Robin and Schürze	Zeit	Rammstein
26 July	"Layla"	DJ Robin and Schürze	Harry's House	Harry Styles
2 August	"Layla"	DJ Robin and Schürze	Liebe siegt	Die Amigos
9 August	"Layla"	DJ Robin and Schürze	Ich würd's wieder tun	Andrea Berg
16 August	"Layla"	DJ Robin and Schürze	Ich würd's wieder tun	Andrea Berg
23 August	"Layla"	DJ Robin and Schürze	11:11	Cro
30 August	"Wildberry Lillet"	Nina Chuba	Per sempre	Giovanni Zarrella
6 September	"Wildberry Lillet"	Nina Chuba	Will of the People	Muse
13 September	"Nachts wach"	Miksu/Macloud and Makko	Yungblud	Yungblud
20 September	"Nachts wach"	Miksu/Macloud and Makko	Palmen aus Plastik 3	Bonez MC and RAF Camora
27 September	"Nachts wach"	Miksu/Macloud and Makko	Palmen aus Plastik 3	Bonez MC and RAF Camora
4 October	"Bamba"	Luciano featuring Aitch and Bia	Palmen aus Plastik 3	Bonez MC and RAF Camora
11 October	"Bamba"	Luciano featuring Aitch and Bia	Glück	Melissa Naschenweng
18 October	"Bamba"	Luciano featuring Aitch and Bia	Glück	Melissa Naschenweng
25 October	"Bamba"	Luciano featuring Aitch and Bia	Return of the Dream Canteen	Red Hot Chili Peppers
1 November	"Bamba"	Luciano featuring Aitch and Bia	Midnights	Taylor Swift
8 November	"Unholy"	Sam Smith and Kim Petras	Midnights	Taylor Swift
15 November	"Unholy"	Sam Smith and Kim Petras	40	Nockis
22 November	"Unholy"	Sam Smith and Kim Petras	Only the Strong Survive	Bruce Springsteen
29 November	"All I Want for Christmas Is You"	Mariah Carey	Stad	Seer
6 December	"All I Want for Christmas Is You"	Mariah Carey	Stad	Seer
13 December	"All I Want for Christmas Is You"	Mariah Carey	Stad	Seer
20 December	"All I Want for Christmas Is You"	Mariah Carey	Paul	Sido
27 December	No Top 40 released			
