= Flower Road =

Single by Big Bang
- Released: March 13, 2018
- Recorded: 2015–2016
- Genre: R&B; hip hop; dance-pop
- Length: 3:49
- Label: YG
- Songwriters: G-Dragon, T.O.P
- Producers: G-Dragon, The Fliptones

Big Bang singles chronology
"Last Dance" (2016)	"Flower Road" (2018)	"Still Life" (2022)

"Flower Road" (Korean: 꽃길; RR: Kkotgil) is a song by South Korean boy band Big Bang. It was released digitally on March 13, 2018, by YG Entertainment, as a gift and a final farewell from the group to its fans ahead of a lengthy hiatus, as the band members serve in South Korea's mandatory military service. It would also end up being their last single to feature longtime lead dancer and sub vocalist Seungri before his retirement on March 11, 2019. It was written by G-Dragon and T.O.P and produced by the former along with The Fliptones, who also participated in creating GD X Taeyang's "Good Boy" and Taeyang's "Stay with Me".

"Flower Road" became the quintet's tenth song to peak atop the Gaon Digital Chart, a record among idol groups. It also became their fourth single to reach the number one on Billboard World Digital Songs. The single also debuted at the top three on Oricon's digital chart.

== Background ==
After the release of the Made album in December 2016, BigBang temporarily ended its five-member activities in early 2017. On February 9 of that same year, T.O.P started his mandatory military service and the rest of the members performed activities throughout the year of 2017 as a quartet. On February 28, 2018, G-Dragon started his mandatory military service, followed by Taeyang on March 12. Previously on March 8, YG Entertainment announced that on the day of Daesung's military enlistment, the group would release a new digital single as a gift to fans. Two days later, more details about the song were released, including its name, "Flower Road", and production credits.

== Composition ==
"Flower Road"
A 22-second sample of "Flower Road", showcasing its R&B melody with smooth rhythmic instrumentals.

The song was created while BigBang were working on their album Made, and the lyrics were written with the future enlistment of the members in mind, which is highlighted in the lines "this is not the end of us / I hope we'll meet again when the flowers are blooming", a request for the fans to wait for them. During the chorus, the members also express an understanding if fans decide to move on, singing "if you want to leave, I understand / I'll scatter flowers on the road you'll walk on." The title of the track, "Flower Road", is a Korean term referring to a "new, glorious journey", which could be interpreted as both the group's or their fan's path. In the beginning and towards the end of the track, G-Dragon gives a fading shoutout to the group's name, which is a reference to their 2008 single "Sunset Glow".

Musically, "Flower Road" was described as a mid-tempo song filled with R&B melodies. The single also contains a "smooth dance-pop vibe", with BigBang's "evocative vocals" being put in the "front and center", while the melody "alternates between rhythmic guitar riffs, a clapping beat, and wailing synth."

== Chart performance ==
Upon its release, "Flower Road" topped all South Korean's domestic music charts within two hours since the song was released. The song debuted at number one on three charts of the Gaon Chart, including the Gaon Digital Chart, recording the highest weekly points of the year. "Flower Road" is the tenth number one song for the group there, making them the group with most number-ones on Gaon, and the second act overall after IU. They also topped the Download and BGM charts, while debuting second on the Mobile Chart and third on the Streaming Chart. The single remained atop the Digital Chart for three consecutive weeks. In its second week, it topped the Streaming chart, remaining at number one at the following week.

In China, the song was the fastest by a Korean artist to reach one million copies sold in QQ Music, China's largest music streaming platform. It is BigBang's fourth consecutive million sales record on QQ Music, which they also achieved with their single albums D (2015) and E (2015), and with Made (2016). Including Kwon Ji Yong, G-Dragon's solo album, it is their fifth consecutive record. The song also topped QQ Music's Comprehensive New Releases Chart, the Popularity Index Chart and Weekly Top Songs. In the United States, the song topped Billboard's World Digital Songs with less than three days of sales. On Billboard Japan the song charted within the top 10 of Billboard Japan Hot 100, while on Oricon, with 20,170 digital copies sold, despite being released mid-week there, the single reached number three on the Weekly Digital Singles chart.

== Critical reception ==
Tamar Herman of Billboard described "Flower Road" as "balancing out melancholy and optimism", because the track "is an homage" to the quintet's "relationship with the millions of fans around the world who have supported them for over a decade." David Watt of All-noise called the single "emotional", writing that it "has all the right ingredients" to become a K-pop hit. Watt also compliments how it "feels really good as the five boys sing together." The lyrics of the track were also praised, with Julia Hur from The Kraze described them as "meaningful" and "emotional". Hur also wrote that "the song holds a sound unique to the group", with the "contrasting emotions" that "balanced out the intensities of each and succeeded in creating a soft atmosphere", mainting a "a light, bright mood from beginning to end", which she described as "perfect to accompany us in the upcoming spring".

== Accolades ==
"Flower Road" won two Melon Weekly Popularity Awards on March 26 and April 2, 2018. It won Digital Bonsang at the 2019 Golden Disc Awards and Song of the Year – March at the 2019 Gaon Chart Music Awards.

Awards and nominations
Year	Organization	Award	Result	Ref.
2018	Melon Music Awards	Song of the Year	Nominated	
2018	Melon Music Awards	Best R&B/Soul	Nominated	
2019	Golden Disc Awards	Digital Daesang (Song of the Year)	Nominated	
2019	Golden Disc Awards	Digital Bonsang (Top 10 Digital Artist)	Won	
2019	Gaon Chart Music Awards	Song of the Year (March)	Won	

== Charts ==
=== Weekly charts ===
Chart performance for "Flower Road"
Chart (2018)	Peak position
France Download (SNEP)	125
Japan (Japan Hot 100)	10
Japan Digital Singles (Oricon)	3
South Korea (Gaon)	1
South Korea (K-pop Hot 100)	2
US World Digital Songs (Billboard)	1

=== Year-end charts ===
Year-end chart performance for "Flower Road"
Chart (2018)	Position
South Korea (Gaon)	17

== Certifications and sales ==
Certifications and sales for "Flower Road"
Region	Certification	Certified units/sales
China	—	2,700,000
Japan	—	20,170
South Korea (KMCA)	Platinum	2,500,000^{*}
United States	—	5,000
Streaming
South Korea (KMCA)	Platinum	100,000,000^{†}
^{*} Sales figures based on certification alone.^{†} Streaming-only figures based on certification alone.

== Release history ==
Release history and formats for "Flower Road"
Region	Date	Format	Label	Ref.
Various	March 13, 2018	Digital download	YG Entertainment	
Japan	March 15, 2018	Digital download	YGEX, Avex Trax	
