= As It Was =

2022 single by Harry Styles

Single by Harry Styles

from the album Harry's House
- Released: 1 April 2022
- Recorded: 2020
- Studio: Henson (Hollywood)
- Genre: Synth-pop; new wave
- Length: 2:47
- Label: Erskine; Columbia
- Songwriters: Harry Styles; Thomas Hull; Tyler Johnson
- Producers: Kid Harpoon; Tyler Johnson

Harry Styles singles chronology
"Fine Line" (2021)	"As It Was" (2022)	"Late Night Talking" (2022)

Music video
- "As It Was" on YouTube

"As It Was" is a song by English singer-songwriter Harry Styles, released through Erskine and Columbia on 1 April 2022 as the lead single from his third studio album, Harry's House (2022). The song was written by Styles alongside his producers Kid Harpoon and Tyler Johnson.

"As It Was" was widely acclaimed by music critics and entered at the top of the UK singles chart, becoming Styles' second solo number-one single, his first being "Sign of the Times" in April 2017. "As It Was" spent ten weeks at the top of the UK Singles Chart, becoming the longest-running number-one and best-selling single of 2022 in his home country. In the United States, it was his second chart-topper on the Billboard Hot 100, where it spent 15 non-consecutive weeks at number one, becoming the longest-running US number one by a UK act and the fourth-longest-running number one in the chart's history. It also spent 38 weeks in the Billboard Hot 100 top ten, making it the sixth longest-charting song in the region. It was ranked at number 500 on Rolling Stone's 500 Greatest Songs of All Time on the 2024 revision.

"As It Was" was the best-selling global single of 2022, earning 2.28 billion subscription stream equivalents globally according to the International Federation of the Phonographic Industry (IFPI). Outside the UK and US, the song was a commercial success and topped the charts in 45 countries, including Australia, Austria, Belgium, Canada, Denmark, France, Germany, Ireland, Lithuania, the Netherlands, New Zealand, Singapore, Sweden, and Norway.

== Background ==
Styles announced the title of his third studio album as Harry's House on 23 March 2022, unveiling its artwork, a 40-second trailer, and the album's release date as 20 May 2022. Five days later, he announced the title of its lead single as "As It Was", alongside 3 pictures of Styles facing away from the camera in a sequinned, sleeveless red outfit, and set its release date as 1 April 2022. Simultaneously, posters bearing the lyrics "It's not the same As It Was" and a picture of Styles sitting on a big ball appeared in various cities. He released a teaser of the music video on 30 March, which included an "energetic drum beat" and a "sunny electric guitar riff", and depicted him in a red jumpsuit spinning in circles atop a motorised turntable.

In an interview with Billboard, Kid Harpoon revealed Styles pushed for the track to become the lead single for the album campaign, stating: "It was Harry that pushed that through. He was like, ‘This is the one. I'm telling you.’ But everyone was like, ‘It should be this other one.’"

== Lyrics and composition ==
"As It Was" was the last song written for Styles' third album, Harry's House. The song was recorded at Sony Music Entertainment CEO Rob Stringer's house in England. In an interview with Consequence of Sound, producer Kid Harpoon stated "We moved all the furniture out and put a drum kit in the TV room. "As It Was" was done in that setup. Harry came in with a riff idea, and we ran with it." In an interview with Hits Radio, Styles said the song was originally written slower before adding synths and drums. He called the original voice note of the slower track "a death march" in an interview with Zane Lowe, although the existence of this version has been disputed by Kid Harpoon. Speaking to Music Week, producer Tyler Johnson stated the track was almost completed in its final form after three or four days with the bridge of the song being written a few days later.

Johnson described the process of writing the single as: "Harry was sitting on the Moog One and I liked what he was playing, so I sat down and played as he started to write the melodies and the lyrics. I said to Harry, 'We need a lead line' and he just came up right away with the 'Dah, dah, dah...' part. He didn't hesitate. Then he started writing the second verse and referring to himself in the third person. So much of this song just came from Harry's heart. And then Tom, with this magical sense of hooks that he has, came up with the idea of doing, 'You know it's not the same...' in the chorus, which I was very impressed with. That turned out to be a very smart move." Styles came up with the idea and melody of the tubular bells included on the track, and plays them on the finished product.

The child's voice which opens the track is Styles' godchild Ruby Winston, daughter of producer Ben Winston. Styles explained the addition in an interview with Capital Breakfast: "She used to try and call me before bedtime every night, and one time it didn't ring or something, so they sent me that. I dug it out when we were in the studio and put it in front of the song for some reason, and I kind of just fell in love with it, so it stuck."

Styles described the meaning of the song as "about metamorphosis, embracing change and former self, perspective shift and all that kind of stuff. It just felt like the thing I wanted to say, the thing I wanted to be doing and the kind of music I wanted to make coming back."

Music critics described the song as a guitar-driven synth-pop and new wave track, a noticeable shift from Styles's rock-oriented sounds. Chris Willman of Variety noted it takes heavy inspiration from Depeche Mode and A-ha, while also suggesting it adopted a style similar to the Weeknd's 2019 single "Blinding Lights". Euphoria magazine felt that Styles was inspired by James Bay's 2018 single "Pink Lemonade", adding that the two songs sound "eerily similar". Lyrically, "As It Was" is rooted in personal transitions and depicts a feeling of loss and loneliness.

== Critical reception ==
Professional ratings
Review scores
Source	Rating
The Guardian	5/5 stars
NME	5/5 stars

"As It Was" received widespread critical acclaim. NME's Rhian Daly gave the song five out of five stars, describing it as "not a million miles away from where Fine Line left off, but hardly retreading old ground." According to Daly, the track suggests Harry's House will solidify Styles "as one of the current pop landscapes' greats". Beau Beaumont-Thomas of The Guardian also rated the song five stars and called it "one of his very best", writing, "Many will pore over the gossipy, self-referential lyrics, but Styles's song is for everyone: an effervescent, high-tempo hit to have you clicking your heels." In his review for Rolling Stone, Rob Sheffield regarded "As It Was" as one of Styles's most "emotionally powerful" songs, calling it a "daring change-up" and a "straight-from-the-heart cry that's also an irresistible dance-floor challenge." Sahar Ghadirian of Clash magazine deemed it a "powerhouse" and Styles "at his most vulnerable". Ghadirian appreciated the "dream fusion" of synth-pop with electro rock and commented that the bells end the song on "a euphoric high". Thania Garcia of Variety magazine described the song as being "new wave-inspired". Hugh McIntyre of Forbes hailed the song as a "decade-defining smash."

Evening Standard reviewer Jochan Embley meanwhile found the track inferior to the singer's previous singles "Watermelon Sugar" and "Adore You", but wrote that Styles and his collaborators "still know how to make an instantly enjoyable tune". Olivia Horn of Pitchfork was less impressed and bemoaned that the song "winds down without any real payoff", citing the circuitousness of the lyrics as "a frequent shortcoming in Styles' songwriting."

Entertainment Weekly named "As It Was" as the best song of 2022: "The synths gallop like excitable ponies while his warm-wash vocals swoop and dip, a sweet little slice of life-support disco for the lonely." USA Today also chose it as the best song of the year: "At first, it sounds like a generically pretty pop song. But then you understand Styles' longing for the perfect something that was yanked away, his dreamy vocals taking on a sadness as he recalls that blissful bubble and resigns himself with a sigh to his current reality. The giggly opening by his goddaughter, pillowy '80s-rooted synths, tubular bells and urging beat contradict his pensiveness." Billboard ranked it at number 3 on their "The 100 Best Songs of 2022" list: "Coming in at a lean 2:47, "As It Was" serves as a broader anthem about how nothing is "the same as it was" before the pandemic, but on a micro level, it turns out Styles isn't the same either as he grapples with fame and the realization that "he's no good alone" when left to his own devices and pills."

BBC ranked it at number 3 on their "25 of the best songs released in 2022" list: "As It Was is a vapour trail of a song, silvery and airborne, as Harry Styles searches for meaning amidst break-ups and loneliness and personal turmoil." NME ranked it at number 3 on their "The 50 best songs of 2022" list: "It's hard not to tumble into the vast emotional depths of 'As It Was' and look beyond everything else that made this song such a triumph. Change is a constant beneath the track's heart-raising BPM and twinkling melodies: here, Harry Styles' empathetic songwriting saw him fight for stability amid breakups and personal upheavals, finding strength in a renewed relationship with himself." The Guardian ranked it at number 5 on their "The 20 best songs of 2022" list: "Occupying the slim valley between A-ha's Take On Me and Vampire Weekend, As It Was delivers bruised-peach hurt, sophisticated languor from the back seat of a tastefully expensive car. He can sing something as vague as "In this world, it's just us / You know it's not the same as it was" and make you feel that he really means it." i-D ranked it at number 10 on their "The 100 best songs of 2022" list: "For an artist reckoning with blinding attention towards his public persona, this infectious, upbeat song about loneliness and change felt like a balm both for the artist and his fans."

NPR ranked it at number 12 on their "100 Best Songs Of 2022" list: "Like a fling who would have never dated you in real life saying arrivederci at summer's end, this song is by turns forlorn, resigned, apologetic and a little caddish. Its slippery nostalgia is grounded in a synth line evoking the New Romantic era of Styles' parents' youth and in the singer's cool, bossa nova-ish croon, which sounds like the way it feels when that departing lover wistfully strokes your hair. The Easter-eggy verses matter to fans, but the chorus is what made "As It Was" so sticky in 2022: It renders regret comfortable, a service everyone needs in a time of chronic heartbreak." Complex ranked it at number 27 on their "50 Best Songs of 2022" list: ""As It Was" is a beautiful, mesmerizing record that lives up to all the buzz it's generated on TikTok (and everywhere else on the internet and radio). It carries an energetic tone thanks to the uptempo instrumentation, and Harry Styles adds layers of emotion with his soft vocals. "As It Was" is a fun and danceable record that continues to demonstrate his power as one of the biggest pop stars in the world." Paste ranked it at number 29 on their "The 50 Best Songs of 2022" list: "Our first glimpse into Harry Styles' newest era, where he is fully immersed in his own flamboyant intricacies, the song is a thoughtful rumination on the exhaustion that stems from not enough love and too much fame."

The Fader ranked it at number 33 on their "The 100 best songs of 2022" list: "On Harry's House lead single "As It Was," the singer hits an effervescent pitch both sonically and conceptually, expressing a willingness to embrace introspection while delivering one of the most textured performances in his loaded discography." Pitchfork ranked it at number 100 on their "The 100 Best Songs of 2022" list: ""As It Was" is the kind of twinkly little confection that would easily get the indie kids pogoing at any local DIY dance night at any point in the last two decades. It just happens to have been recorded by one of the biggest pop stars in the world in 2022 instead of, say, the Strokes twenty years earlier. "You know it's not the same as it was," Harry Styles sighs, giving a nod to the easy bait of nostalgia. A pointillist synth line tap dances through the song, and all over that nagging pandemic-era malaise we're all desperately trying to shake. Resistance is futile."

Associated Press placed it on their "Top Songs of 2022" list: "The song is deceptively upbeat with a jingly synth-pop beat and a little kid's voice as the intro and wedding bells at the end. But the lyrics are self-referentially melancholic as he accepts the reality of change that even he is not quite ready for." Esquire placed it on their "The 45 Best Songs of 2022" list: ""As It Was" was Harry Styles first single this year, and it did not disappoint. This glittering track fuels nostalgia as Styles sings about life which is, of course, always changing. (Reality bites!)"

=== Recognition ===
"As It Was" was praised by many musicians and those within the entertainment industry. Sir Elton John declared the track as "one of the great records of the year" and that it should win Song of The Year at The Grammys. Lindsay Buckingham praised the song as "a great pop song" in discussion with Omar Apollo. Jon Bon Jovi stated "It is not going to be the same as it was folks, I love that because he gave you a slap upside the head and said, “I'm here with you but doing it on my terms.” Artists such as Jorja Smith and Arcade Fire also covered the song in the Live Lounge.

=== Year-end lists ===
Numerous critics and publications listed "As It Was" in their year-end ranking of the best songs of 2022, often inside the top-ten.

Select year-end rankings of "As It Was"
Publication	List	Rank	Ref.
Billboard	The 100 Best Songs of 2022: Staff List	3	
Consequence of Sound	Top 50 Songs of 2022	9	
DIY magazine	DIY's tracks of 2022	12	
Entertainment Weekly	The 10 best songs of 2022	1	
Esquire	The 45 Best Songs of 2022 (So Far)	Placed	
Exclaim	Exclaim!'s 25 Best Songs of 2022	8	
NME	Top 50 Best Songs of 2022	3	
Pitchfork	The 100 Best Songs of 2022	100	
Rolling Stone	The 100 Best Songs of 2022	9	
Slate	The Best Songs of 2022	Placed	
The Guardian	The 20 Best Songs of 2022	5	
UPROXX	The Best Songs Of 2022	Placed	
UPROXX	Music Critics Poll: The Best Songs Of The Year	7	
BBC News	25 of the best songs released in 2022	3	

=== All-time lists ===
In 2024, "As It Was" was included in Rolling Stone's "The 500 Greatest Songs of All Time" list.

All-time lists for "As It Was"
Publication	List	Rank	Ref.
Rolling Stone	The 500 Greatest Songs of All Time	500	

== Commercial performance ==
=== Global ===
"As It Was" was an immediate success; it earned the Guinness World Records title for the most streamed track on Spotify within 24 hours by a male artist, and broke the Apple Music streaming record for most first-day streams for a 2022 release. The song also opened atop the Billboard Global 200 with the greatest global streaming week of 2022, becoming Styles's first number-one on the tally. Globally, "As It Was" was the best-selling global single of 2022, earning 2.28 billion subscription streams equivalents globally according to the International Federation of the Phonographic Industry (IFPI). It was also the fifth best-selling global single of 2023 with 1.46 billion subscription streams equivalents. "As It Was" ranked as the most popular song on Spotify and the second most popular song on Apple Music in 2022. It was the 3rd most streamed song on Spotify and the 14th biggest song on Apple Music in 2023.

The song reached number one on the official charts of Australia, Austria, Belgium, Croatia, Denmark, Germany, Greece, Ireland, Lithuania, the Netherlands, New Zealand, Slovakia, Sweden, and Switzerland.

=== United Kingdom ===
In the UK, "As It Was" became Styles's second solo number-one on the singles chart, debuting with the biggest sales and streaming weeks of any single in 2022. It spent ten weeks at number one on the UK singles chart, becoming the longest-running number one of the year in the UK. It became the most-streamed track (149.6 million streams), most physically purchased (12,000 units), most digitally downloaded (47,000 units) and overall, best-selling (1.3 million equivalent units) track in the UK in 2022, as of October 2022. It was the 9th biggest song in the UK in 2023 according to the Official Charts Company.

=== North America ===
"As It Was" entered at number one on the Billboard Hot 100, becoming Styles' second number-one single after "Watermelon Sugar" (2019). The song garnered the most single-day streams on Spotify in the United States, surpassing Olivia Rodrigo's "Drivers License" (2021). After the single's debut at No. 1, "As It Was" fell out of the No. 1 position and returned multiple times between April and September 2022; when it returned to No. 1 for the week ending 3 September 2022, it became the first song ever to have five separate runs in the top position. "As It Was" spent 15 weeks atop the Billboard Hot 100, becoming the longest-running US number one by a UK act, the second longest-running No. 1 with no accompanying artists (i.e. a solo-billed song) and the fourth longest running number-one in the chart's history. In addition, "As It Was" spent 18 weeks at number one on the Canadian Hot 100.

== Music video ==
The music video for "As It Was" was released alongside the song. In the clip, Styles joins dancer Mathilde Lin on a turning platform and performs choreography by Yoann Bourgeois in the Barbican to release negative emotions. The video was filmed in London: apart from the Barbican Centre and Barbican Conservatory, at Lindley Hall near the Houses of Parliament, and at the penguin pool at London Zoo. It was directed by Tanu Muino, who stated that directing for Styles was "a bucket list dream come true" but, on the second day of shooting, Muino's home country of Ukraine was invaded by Russia, rendering the process a "bittersweet" experience; nevertheless, Muino and her team from Ukraine "poured so much love into this video and you can see it on screen. The music video references a photo mural of industrial designers Charles and Ray Eames on exhibit at LACMA as Styles and his love interest grow further apart. It will be a music video I will never forget and now I can happily retire.". Styles later released a Behind The Scenes version of the making of the music video. The video was nominated for the Best Music Video at the 65th Annual Grammy Awards in 2023.

== Accolades ==
Awards and nominations for "As It Was"
Organization	Year	Category	Result	Ref.
IHeartRadio Titanium Awards	2022	1 Billion Total Audience Spins on iHeartRadio Stations	Won	
MTV Millennial Awards	2022	Global Hit of the Year	Nominated	
MTV Millennial Awards Brazil	2022	Global Hit	Nominated	
MTV Video Music Awards	2022	Video of the Year	Nominated	
MTV Video Music Awards	2022	Best Pop	Won	
MTV Video Music Awards	2022	Best Direction	Nominated	
MTV Video Music Awards	2022	Best Choreography	Nominated	
MTV Video Music Awards	2022	Best Cinematography	Won	
Los 40 Music Awards	2022	Best International Song	Nominated	
Los 40 Music Awards	2022	Best International Video	Nominated	
UK Music Video Awards	2022	Best Pop Video - UK	Won	
MTV Video Music Awards Japan	2022	Best International Solo Artist Video	Won	
MTV Europe Music Awards	2022	Best Song	Nominated	
MTV Europe Music Awards	2022	Best Video	Nominated	
NRJ Music Award	2022	Video of The Year	Won	
NRJ Music Award	2022	International Hit of the Year	Won	
People's Choice Awards	2022	Favorite Song	Nominated	
People's Choice Awards	2022	Favorite Music Video	Nominated	
Premios MUSA	2022	International Anglo Song of the Year	Won	
Guinness World Records	2022	Most Streamed Song by a Male Artist in 24 Hours on Spotify	Won	
Guinness World Records	2022	Most Streamed Song by a Male Artist in a Week on Spotify	Won	
Guinness World Records	2022	Most Streamed Song in a Year on Spotify (2022)	Won	
American Music Awards	2022	Favorite Music Video	Nominated	
American Music Awards	2022	Favorite Pop Song	Won	
Danish Music Awards	2022	International Hit of the Year	Nominated	
APRA Music Awards	2023	Most Performed International Work	Won	
Grammy Awards	2023	Record of the Year	Nominated	
Grammy Awards	2023	Song of the Year	Nominated	
Grammy Awards	2023	Best Pop Solo Performance	Nominated	
Grammy Awards	2023	Best Music Video	Nominated	
Brits Awards	2023	Song of the Year	Won	
iHeartRadio Music Awards	2023	Song of the Year	Nominated	
iHeartRadio Music Awards	2023	Best Music Video	Nominated	
iHeartRadio Music Awards	2023	TikTok Bop of the Year	Nominated	
GAFFA Awards	2023	International Hit of the Year	Won	
Global Awards	2023	Best Song	Won	
Nickelodeon Kids' Choice Awards	2023	Favorite Song	Won	
Ivor Novello Awards	2023	Best Song Musically and Lyrically	Nominated	
Ivor Novello Awards	2023	PRS for Music Most Performed Work	Won	
Ivor Novello Awards	2024	PRS for Music Most Performed Work	Nominated	

== Live performances ==
Styles performed "As It Was" for the first time at the Coachella Valley Music and Arts Festival on 15 and 22 April 2022. At the 'One Night Only' performance for Harry's House, Styles surprised the crowd at UBS Arena with an encore of the track. Speaking on the experience to Rolling Stone, Styles stated: "We came offstage, and I went into my dressing room and just wanted to sit by myself for a minute, After One Direction, I didn't expect to ever experience anything new. I kind of felt like, ‘All right, I’ve seen how crazy it can get and I think there was something about it where I was ... not terrified, but I just needed a minute. Because I wasn't sure what it was. Just that the energy felt insane."

Styles performed "As It Was" at the 65th Annual Grammy Awards with a rotating stage and routine choreographed in the style of the music video by Yoann Bourgeois. However, a technical malfunction caused the stage to rotate the wrong way and forced the dancers with Styles to perform the dance in reverse. Dancers included in the routine stated, "there was nothing we could do to stop it" once the performance began. Styles "called the team in charge to make sure they were OK" after the performance, according to Grammys set designer Julio Himede.

== Credits and personnel ==
- Harry Styles – vocals, songwriting, tubular bells
- Kid Harpoon – songwriting, production, bass, guitar, drum machine, drums, electric guitar, synthesizer
- Tyler Johnson – songwriting, production, drum machine, piano, synthesizer
- Doug Showalter – electric guitar, percussion
- Mitch Rowland – drums
- Jeremy Hatcher – programming, recording
- Randy Merrill – mastering
- Spike Stent – mixing
- Katie May – assistant engineering
- Luke Gibbs – assistant engineering
- Adele Phillips – assistant engineering
- Josh Caulder – assistant engineering
- Joe Dougherty – assistant engineering
- Matt Wolach – assistant engineering

== Charts ==
=== Weekly charts ===
Weekly chart performance for "As It Was"
Chart (2022–2026)	Peak position
Argentina Hot 100 (Billboard)	2
Argentina Airplay (Monitor Latino)	1
Australia (ARIA)	1
Austria (Ö3 Austria Top 40)	1
Belarus Airplay (TopHit)	12
Belgium (Ultratop 50 Flanders)	1
Belgium (Ultratop 50 Wallonia)	1
Bolivia (Billboard)	2
Brazil (Billboard)	13
Bulgaria Airplay (PROPHON)	1
Canada Hot 100 (Billboard)	1
Canada AC (Billboard)	1
Canada CHR/Top 40 (Billboard)	1
Canada Hot AC (Billboard)	1
Chile (Billboard)	13
Chile Airplay (Monitor Latino)	4
CIS Airplay (TopHit)	1
Colombia (Billboard)	13
Costa Rica Airplay (FONOTICA)	5
Costa Rica Streaming (FONOTICA)	2
Croatia (Billboard)	3
Croatia International Airplay (Top lista)	1
Czech Republic Airplay (ČNS IFPI)	1
Czech Republic Singles Digital (ČNS IFPI)	1
Denmark (Tracklisten)	1
Dominican Republic Anglo Airplay (Monitor Latino)	1
Ecuador (Billboard)	9
Ecuador Airplay (Monitor Latino)	3
El Salvador Airplay (Monitor Latino)	2
Estonia Airplay (TopHit)	39
Finland (Suomen virallinen lista)	2
France (SNEP)	1
Germany (GfK)	1
Global 200 (Billboard)	1
Greece International (IFPI)	1
Guatemala Airplay (Monitor Latino)	9
Honduras Airplay (Monitor Latino)	16
Hong Kong (Billboard)	19
Hungary (Rádiós Top 40)	1
Hungary (Single Top 40)	7
Hungary (Stream Top 40)	1
Iceland (Tónlistinn)	1
India International (IMI)	1
Indonesia (Billboard)	3
Ireland (IRMA)	1
Israel (Mako Hitlist)	55
Italy (FIMI)	3
Jamaica Airplay (JAMMS)	2
Japan Hot Overseas (Billboard Japan)	2
Kazakhstan Airplay (TopHit)	44
Latin America Anglo Airplay (Monitor Latino)	1
Latvia Airplay (LaIPA)	1
Latvia Streaming (LaIPA)	6
Lebanon (Lebanese Top 20)	1
Lithuania (AGATA)	1
Luxembourg (Billboard)	1
Malaysia (Billboard)	1
Mexico (Billboard)	1
Netherlands (Dutch Top 40)	1
Netherlands (Single Top 100)	1
New Zealand (Recorded Music NZ)	1
Nicaragua Anglo Airplay (Monitor Latino)	1
Nigeria (TurnTable Top 100)	18
Norway (VG-lista)	2
Panama Airplay (Monitor Latino)	5
Paraguay Airplay (Monitor Latino)	4
Peru (Billboard)	2
Philippines (Billboard)	4
Poland Airplay (ZPAV)	1
Poland (Polish Streaming Top 100)	32
Portugal (AFP)	1
Puerto Rico Anglo Airplay (Monitor Latino)	1
Romania (Billboard)	4
Romania Airplay (UPFR)	1
Romania TV Airplay (Media Forest)	1
Russia Airplay (TopHit)	1
San Marino Airplay (SMRTV Top 50)	2
Singapore (Billboard)	1
Slovakia Airplay (ČNS IFPI)	1
Slovakia Singles Digital (ČNS IFPI)	1
South Africa Airplay (TOSAC)	1
South Africa Streaming (TOSAC)	2
South Korea (Gaon)	113
Spain (Promusicae)	10
Suriname (Nationale Top 40)	1
Sweden (Sverigetopplistan)	1
Switzerland (Schweizer Hitparade)	1
Turkey (Billboard)	2
Ukraine Airplay (TopHit)	10
UK Singles (Official Charts)	1
Uruguay Airplay (Monitor Latino)	3
US Billboard Hot 100	1
US Adult Contemporary (Billboard)	1
US Adult Pop Airplay (Billboard)	1
US Dance Airplay (Billboard)	1
US Pop Airplay (Billboard)	1
US Rhythmic Airplay (Billboard)	35
US Rock & Alternative Airplay (Billboard)	28
Venezuela Anglo Airplay (Monitor Latino)	1
Vietnam (Vietnam Hot 100)	10

=== Monthly charts ===
Monthly chart performance for "As It Was"
Chart (2022–2023)	Peak position
Brazil Streaming (Pro-Música Brasil)	17
CIS Airplay (TopHit)	1
Czech Republic (Rádio – Top 100)	1
Czech Republic (Singles Digitál – Top 100)	2
Estonia Airplay (TopHit)	42
Lithuania Airplay (TopHit)	33
Paraguay Airplay (SGP)	12
Romania Airplay (TopHit)	34
Russia Airplay (TopHit)	4
South Korea (Gaon)	123
Slovakia (Rádio – Top 100)	1
Slovakia (Singles Digitál – Top 100)	1
Ukraine Airplay (TopHit)	12

=== Year-end charts ===
2022 year-end chart performance for "As It Was"
Chart (2022)	Position
Australia (ARIA)	1
Austria (Ö3 Austria Top 40)	3
Belgium (Ultratop 50 Flanders)	1
Belgium (Ultratop 50 Wallonia)	1
Brazil Airplay (Crowley Charts)	93
Brazil Streaming (Pro-Música Brasil)	35
Canada (Canadian Hot 100)	2
CIS Airplay (TopHit)	2
Costa Rica Airplay (Monitor Latino)	11
Denmark (Tracklisten)	8
El Salvador Airplay (Monitor Latino)	11
Germany (Official German Charts)	6
Global 200 (Billboard)	1
Global Singles (IFPI)	1
Guatemala Airplay (Monitor Latino)	100
Honduras Airplay (Monitor Latino)	39
Hungary (Rádiós Top 40)	45
Hungary (Single Top 40)	24
Hungary (Stream Top 40)	6
Iceland (Tónlistinn)	1
Italy (FIMI)	16
Lithuania (AGATA)	1
Netherlands (Dutch Top 40)	1
Netherlands (Single Top 100)	2
New Zealand (Recorded Music NZ)	2
Panama Airplay (Monitor Latino)	9
Paraguay Airplay (Monitor Latino)	6
Poland (ZPAV)	4
Puerto Rico Airplay (Monitor Latino)	52
Russia Airplay (TopHit)	12
Singapore Streaming (RIAS)	3
Sweden (Sverigetopplistan)	4
Switzerland (Schweizer Hitparade)	2
UK Singles (OCC)	1
Ukraine Airplay (TopHit)	64
Uruguay Airplay (Monitor Latino)	1
US Billboard Hot 100	2
US Adult Alternative Airplay (Billboard)	49
US Adult Contemporary (Billboard)	8
US Adult Top 40 (Billboard)	4
US Dance/Mix Show Airplay (Billboard)	1
US Mainstream Top 40 (Billboard)	1
Vietnam (Vietnam Hot 100)	81

2023 year-end chart performance for "As It Was"
Chart (2023)	Position
Australia (ARIA)	9
Austria (Ö3 Austria Top 40)	17
Belarus Airplay (TopHit)	63
Belgium (Ultratop 50 Flanders)	12
Belgium (Ultratop 50 Wallonia)	48
Brazil Airplay (Crowley Charts)	87
Brazil Streaming (Pro-Música Brasil)	75
Canada (Canadian Hot 100)	10
CIS Airplay (TopHit)	29
Denmark (Tracklisten)	50
Estonia Airplay (TopHit)	53
Germany (Official German Charts)	25
Global 200 (Billboard)	6
Global Singles (IFPI)	5
Iceland (Tónlistinn)	25
Italy (FIMI)	86
Kazakhstan Airplay (TopHit)	116
Lithuania Airplay (TopHit)	25
Netherlands (Single Top 100)	27
New Zealand (Recorded Music NZ)	13
Poland (Polish Airplay Top 100)	58
Poland (Polish Streaming Top 100)	57
Romania Airplay (TopHit)	78
Russia Airplay (TopHit)	89
Sweden (Sverigetopplistan)	71
Switzerland (Schweizer Hitparade)	8
UK Singles (OCC)	9
Ukraine Airplay (TopHit)	99
US Billboard Hot 100	15
US Adult Contemporary (Billboard)	3
US Adult Top 40 (Billboard)	32
US Mainstream Top 40 (Billboard)	10

2024 year-end chart performance for "As It Was"
Chart (2024)	Position
Australia (ARIA)	64
Belarus Airplay (TopHit)	178
CIS Airplay (TopHit)	74
Estonia Airplay (TopHit)	71
France (SNEP)	112
Global 200 (Billboard)	29
Iceland (Tónlistinn)	68
Poland (Polish Airplay Top 100)	84
Portugal (AFP)	82
Romania Airplay (TopHit)	181
Switzerland (Schweizer Hitparade)	68
UK Singles (OCC)	68
US Adult Contemporary (Billboard)	43

2025 year-end chart performance for "As It Was"
Chart (2025)	Position
Argentina Anglo Airplay (Monitor Latino)	20
Chile Airplay (Monitor Latino)	29
CIS Airplay (TopHit)	147
Estonia Airplay (TopHit)	112
Global 200 (Billboard)	98
Poland (Polish Airplay Top 100)	95
Romania Airplay (TopHit)	182

== Certifications ==
Certifications for "As It Was"
Region	Certification	Certified units/sales
Australia (ARIA)	12× Platinum	840,000^{‡}
Austria (IFPI Austria)	2× Platinum	60,000^{‡}
Brazil (Pro-Música Brasil)	10× Diamond	1,600,000^{‡}
Canada (Music Canada)	8× Platinum	640,000^{‡}
Denmark (IFPI Danmark)	2× Platinum	180,000^{‡}
France (SNEP)	Diamond	333,333^{‡}
Germany (BVMI)	3× Gold	600,000^{‡}
Hungary (MAHASZ)	8× Platinum	32,000^{‡}
Italy (FIMI)	5× Platinum	500,000^{‡}
Mexico (AMPROFON)	2× Diamond+2× Platinum	1,680,000^{‡}
New Zealand (RMNZ)	8× Platinum	240,000^{‡}
Poland (ZPAV)	Diamond	250,000^{‡}
Portugal (AFP)	Diamond	250,000^{‡}
Spain (Promusicae)	6× Platinum	360,000^{‡}
Switzerland (IFPI Switzerland)	4× Platinum	80,000^{‡}
United Kingdom (BPI)	6× Platinum	3,600,000^{‡}
United States (RIAA)	6× Platinum	6,000,000^{‡}
Streaming
Greece (IFPI Greece)	Diamond	10,000,000^{†}
Japan (RIAJ)	Gold	50,000,000^{†}
Sweden (GLF)	2× Platinum	16,000,000^{†}
Worldwide	—	3,740,000,000
^{‡} Sales+streaming figures based on certification alone.^{†} Streaming-only figures based on certification alone.

== Release history ==
Release dates and formats for "As It Was"
Region	Date	Format(s)	Label(s)	Ref.
Various	1 April 2022	Digital download; streaming	Erskine; Columbia	
Italy	1 April 2022	Radio airplay	Sony	
United States	4 April 2022	Adult contemporary radio	Columbia	
United States	5 April 2022	Contemporary hit radio	Columbia	
United Kingdom	15 April 2022	CD single	Erskine; Columbia	

== See also ==
- List of best-selling singles in Brazil
- List of best-selling singles in Mexico
- List of Billboard Hot 100 number ones of 2022
- List of Billboard Global 200 number ones of 2022
- List of Billboard Mainstream Top 40 number-one songs of 2022
- List of Billboard Mexico Airplay number ones
- List of Canadian Hot 100 number-one singles of 2022
- List of Dutch Top 40 number-one singles of 2022
- List of highest-certified singles in Australia
- List of number-one hits of 2022 (Austria)
- List of number-one hits of 2022 (Denmark)
- List of number-one hits of 2022 (France)
- List of number-one hits of 2022 (Germany)
- List of number-one hits of 2022 (Switzerland)
- List of number-one singles and albums in Sweden#2022
- List of number-one singles from the 2020s (New Zealand)
- List of number-one singles of 2022 (Australia)
- List of number-one singles of 2022 (Ireland)
- List of number-one singles of 2022 (Poland)
- List of number-one songs of 2022 (Malaysia)
- List of number-one songs of 2022 (Singapore)
- List of Ultratop 50 number-one singles of 2022
- List of UK Singles Chart number ones of the 2020s#2022
- List of Billboard Hot 100 chart achievements and milestones
