= Still Life (BigBang song) =

2022 single by BigBang

Single by BigBang
- Released: April 5, 2022
- Recorded: 2022
- Genre: Soft rock
- Length: 3:07
- Label: YG
- Composers: Kush; VVN; Vince; G-Dragon; T.O.P
- Lyricists: G-Dragon; T.O.P; Kush
- Producers: Kush; Seo Won-jin; 24

BigBang singles chronology
"Flower Road" (2018)	"Still Life" (2022)	"Biiig" (2026)

Music video
- "Still Life" on YouTube

"Still Life" (Korean: 봄여름가을겨울; RR: Bom Yeoreum Gaeul Gyeoul; lit. 'Spring Summer Fall Winter') is a song by South Korean boy band BigBang. It was released via YG Entertainment on April 5, 2022, serving as the group's first release in four years since "Flower Road" in 2018, as well as their only release as a quartet, due to T.O.P's departure the following year.

"Still Life" experienced commercial success, topping the charts in several territories upon its release including in South Korea, Vietnam, Singapore, Hong Kong and Malaysia. It debuted within the top ten on the Billboard Global 200 at number nine, making BigBang only the third K-pop group to do so since the chart's inception in 2020.

== Background and release ==
T.O.P was the first BigBang member to enlist for his two-year service per South Korea's mandatory military service requirement in February 2017. The remaining four members continued group promotions without him, holding several concerts in various countries until December. In 2018, members G-Dragon, Taeyang and Daesung similarly began their military enlistment, thus putting group activities on a hiatus. The digital single "Flower Road" was released in March 2018 as a gift and a farewell from the group to its fans ahead of a lengthy hiatus, as the band members complete their mandatory military service.

The group's fifth member, Seungri, was initially set to enlist on March 25, 2019. On March 11, however, Seungri announced his departure from the group as well as his retirement from the entertainment industry due to the controversy of his involvement in the Burning Sun scandal. The rest of the band members were discharged from the military during the remainder of the year. In March 2020, despite reports suggesting otherwise, all four members renewed their contracts with YG Entertainment and were preparing for a comeback, which was eventually delayed due to the COVID-19 pandemic. On March 21, 2022, local time, YG confirmed that the group would make their comeback with a new single on April 5, 2022; the title of the track "Still Life" was unveiled three days later.

== Critical reception ==
Professional ratings
Review scores
Source	Rating
NME	5/5 stars

"Still Life" received positive reviews from critics. Angela Patricia Suacillo from NME gave the song 5 stars out of 5, saying that the track "honors the distance between where the group were four years ago and where they are now", adding that the song "reminiscent of soft rock from the ’70s and ’ 80s, ’Still Life’ excels at bringing out the unique vocal tones of each member". Suacillo felt that the song "close a chapter of their lives that's been left hanging for the past four years – whether or not this signifies a final bow from the group is something we'll have to wait and see". Rolling Stone's Kristine Kwak felt the song shows BigBang's "vulnerability and growth", and how the members have become "more introspective and seem to be content with where they are at".

"Still Life" was ranked amongst the best songs of 2022 by Slant Magazine (27), Rolling Stone (73), and Time Out (12), as well as one of the best K-pop songs of the year by Billboard (3) and Nylon.

== Commercial performance ==
Upon its release, "Still Life" topped all South Korean's domestic music charts and also topped realtime charts on major music streaming sites in China and Japan. The song debuted at number one on South Korea's Gaon Digital Chart in the chart issue dated April 3–9, 2022; on its component charts, the song also debuted at number one on the Gaon Download Chart, Gaon Streaming Chart, and Gaon BGM Chart. "Still Life" remained atop the Digital Chart for three non-consecutive weeks. In addition, it also remained at number one on the Streaming Chart for five consecutive weeks. On the Billboard K-pop Hot 100, the song debuted at number two in the chart issue dated April 16, 2022, ascending to number one in the following week.

In Hong Kong, "Still Life" debuted at number one on the Billboard Hong Kong Songs in the chart issue dated April 16, 2022. In Indonesia, the song debuted at number eight on the Billboard Indonesia Songs in the chart issue dated April 16, 2022. "Still Life" debuted atop the charts in other Asian territories such on the Billboard Malaysia Songs for two consecutive weeks, in Singapore on the RIAS Top Streaming Chart in the chart issue dated April 1–7, 2022 and Billboard Vietnam Hot 100, which in the latter remained at number one for three consecutive weeks. In Taiwan, "Still Life" debuted at number three on the Billboard Taiwan Songs in the chart issue dated April 16, 2022. In Japan, the song debuted at number seven on the Billboard Japan Hot 100 in the chart issue dated April 13, 2022; on its component charts, it debuted at number two on the Download Songs, number seventeen on the Streaming Songs, and number nine on the Top User Generated Songs. On the Oricon Combined Singles, "Still Life" debuted at number eleven in the chart issue dated April 18, 2022.

In New Zealand, the song debuted at number eight on the RMNZ Hot Singles in the chart issue dated April 11, 2022, In Australia, "Still Life" debuted at number three on the ARIA Top 20 Hitseekers Singles Chart in the chart issue dated April 11, 2022.

In United States, "Still Life" debuted at number one on the Billboard World Digital Song Sales making it BigBang's fifth single to do so. In addition, it peaked at number 24 on the Billboard Digital Song Sales in the chart issue dated April 16, 2022. In Canada, the song debuted at number 87 on the Billboard Canadian Hot 100 in the chart issue dated April 16, 2022. Globally, the song topped iTunes Top Songs charts in 33 regions and debuted at number nine on the Billboard Global 200, with 34 million streams and 29,700 sold worldwide, making BigBang the third Korean group to enter the top 10 on the chart, and debuted at number three on the Billboard Global Excl. U.S. in the chart issue dated April 16, 2022.

== Accolades ==
Awards and nominations
Organization	Year	Category	Result	Ref.
Asian Pop Music Awards	2022	Record of the Year – Overseas	Nominated	
Asian Pop Music Awards	2022	Best Music Video – Overseas	Nominated	
Asian Pop Music Awards	2022	Best Lyricist – Overseas (Note: Nominated for G-Dragon, T.O.P and Kush)	Nominated	
Asian Pop Music Awards	2022	Top 20 Songs – Overseas	Won	
Genie Music Awards	2022	Song of the Year	Nominated	
Golden Disc Awards	2023	Digital Daesang	Nominated	
Golden Disc Awards	2023	Digital Bonsang	Won	
MAMA Awards	2022	Best Vocal Performance – Group	Won	
Melon Music Awards	2022	Song of the Year	Nominated	
Tencent Music Entertainment Awards	2023	Digital Single of the Year	Won	

Music program awards (9 total)
Program	Date	Ref.
M Countdown	April 14, 2022	
M Countdown	April 21, 2022	
M Countdown	April 28, 2022	
Inkigayo	April 17, 2022	
Inkigayo	April 24, 2022	
Inkigayo	May 1, 2022	
Show! Music Core	April 23, 2022	
Show! Music Core	April 30, 2022	
Show! Music Core	May 7, 2022	

== Credits and personnel ==
- Big Bang – lead vocals
  - G-Dragon – lyrics, composition
  - T.O.P. – lyrics, composition
- Kush – lyrics, composition, arrangement, piano
- VVN – composition
- Vince – composition
- Seo Won-jin – arrangement, guitar
- 24 – arrangement, keyboard

== Charts ==
=== Weekly charts ===
Weekly chart performance for "Still Life"
Chart (2022)	Peak position
Australia Hitseekers (ARIA)	3
Canada Hot 100 (Billboard)	87
Global 200 (Billboard)	9
Hong Kong (Billboard)	1
Hungary (Single Top 40)	17
Indonesia (Billboard)	8
Japan Hot 100 (Billboard)	7
Japan Combined Singles (Oricon)	11
Malaysia (Billboard)	1
Malaysia International (RIM)	1
Netherlands (Global 40)	16
New Zealand Hot Singles (RMNZ)	8
Singapore (RIAS)	1
South Korea (Gaon)	1
South Korea (K-pop Hot 100)	1
Taiwan (Billboard)	3
UK Singles Downloads (Official Charts)	57
US Digital Song Sales (Billboard)	24
US World Digital Song Sales (Billboard)	1
Vietnam (Vietnam Hot 100)	1

=== Monthly charts ===
Monthly chart performance for "Still Life"
Chart (2022)	Position
South Korea (Gaon)	1

=== Year-end charts ===
2022 year-end charts performance for "Still Life"
Chart (2022)	Position
South Korea (Circle)	7
Vietnam (Vietnam Hot 100)	56

2023 year-end chart performance for "Still Life"
Chart (2023)	Position
South Korea (Circle)	125

2024 year-end chart performance for "Still Life"
Chart (2024)	Position
South Korea (Circle)	181

2025 year-end chart performance for "Still Life"
Chart (2025)	Position
South Korea (Circle)	115

== Certifications ==
Streaming certifications for "Still Life"
Region	Certification	Certified units/sales
South Korea (KMCA)	Platinum	100,000,000^{†}
^{†} Streaming-only figures based on certification alone.

== Release history ==
Release dates and formats for "Still Life"
Region	Date	Format	Label	Ref.
Various	April 5, 2022	Digital download; streaming	YG	

== See also ==
- List of Gaon (Circle) Digital Chart number ones of 2022
- List of K-pop Hot 100 number ones of 2022
- List of number-one songs of 2022 (Malaysia)
- List of number-one songs of 2022 (Singapore)
