= Partyschlager =

Music genre originating in Germany

- Cultural origins: 1960s, Germany

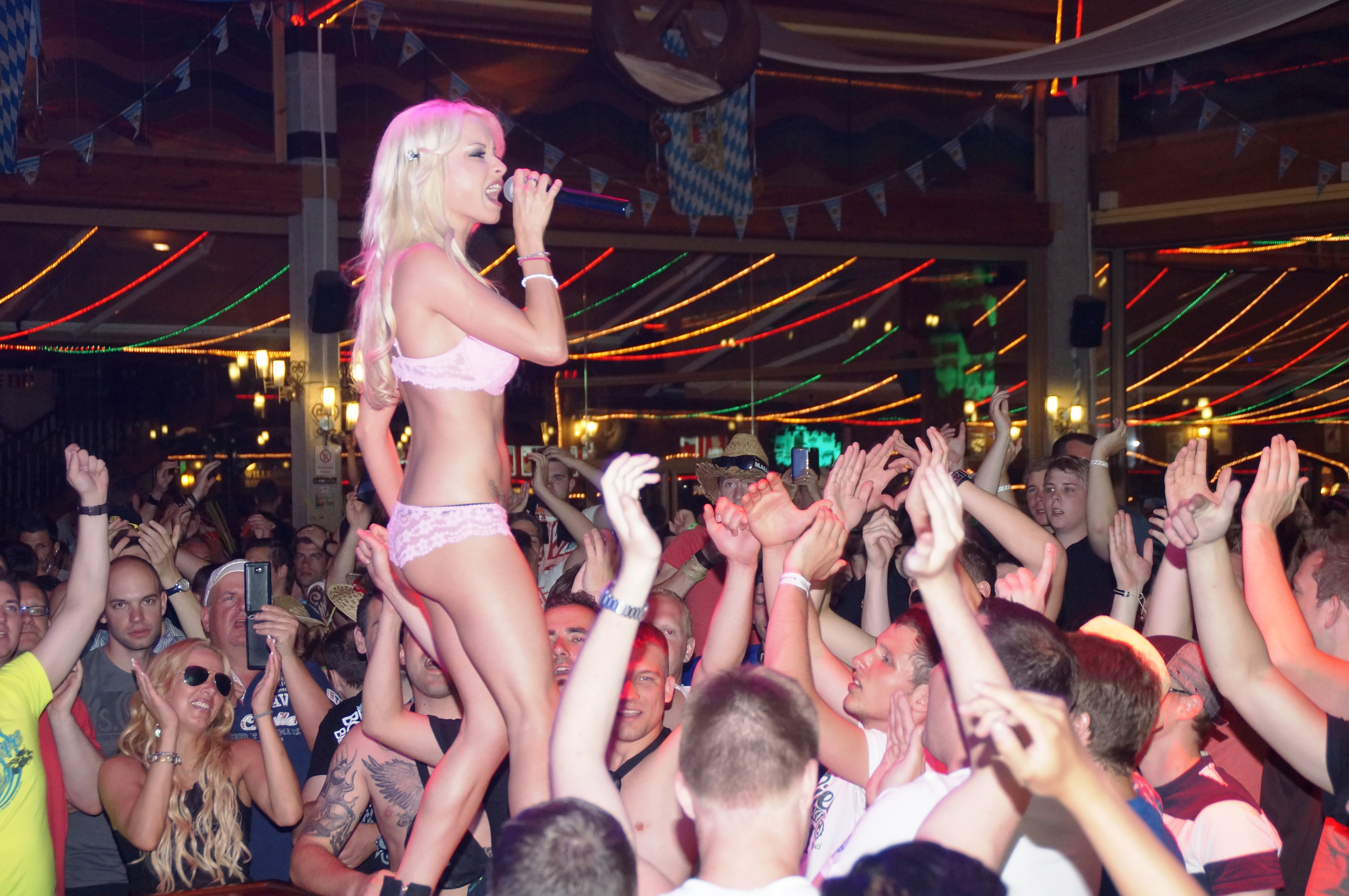
Mia Julia performing at the Bierkönig in Mallorca (2013)

Partyschlager (also called Party-Schlager and Partymusik) is a form of schlager that has been popular since the 1990s, using stylistic elements from Eurodance, EDM, and Hands Up. Within partyschlager, there are various categories based on themes and occasions, such as Ballermann, après-ski, carnival, Oktoberfest, or Wiesn hits.

== History ==
The term party music had already been used for popular music earlier, for example by a label called Party-Musik founded by Electrola in 1966. Tony Marshall is considered one of the first representatives of party mood music in the 1970s, and the group Die 3 Besoffskis was considered a forerunner of Ballermann music. Their biggest hit, "Puff von Barcelona" (1975), was covered by Mickie Krause in 1999.

The style became known with pieces such as "König von Mallorca" (1999) by Jürgen Drews and "10 Nackte Friseusen" (1999) by Mickie Krause. Since the 1990s, schlager songs have also been released as party remixes, such as "Wahnsinn" (1983) by Wolfgang Petry and Die Lollies (1998), "Marmor, Stein und Eisen bricht" by Drafi Deutscher (1965), or "Ein Stern (...der deinen Namen trägt)" by Nik P. (1998) and DJ Ötzi (2007). The song "Layla" by DJ Robin and Schürze became the official summer hit of 2022 and sparked a sexism debate. The song also brought the style of pop music to attention outside of the party scene. In 2023, several partyschlager songs made it into the charts.

== Distribution ==
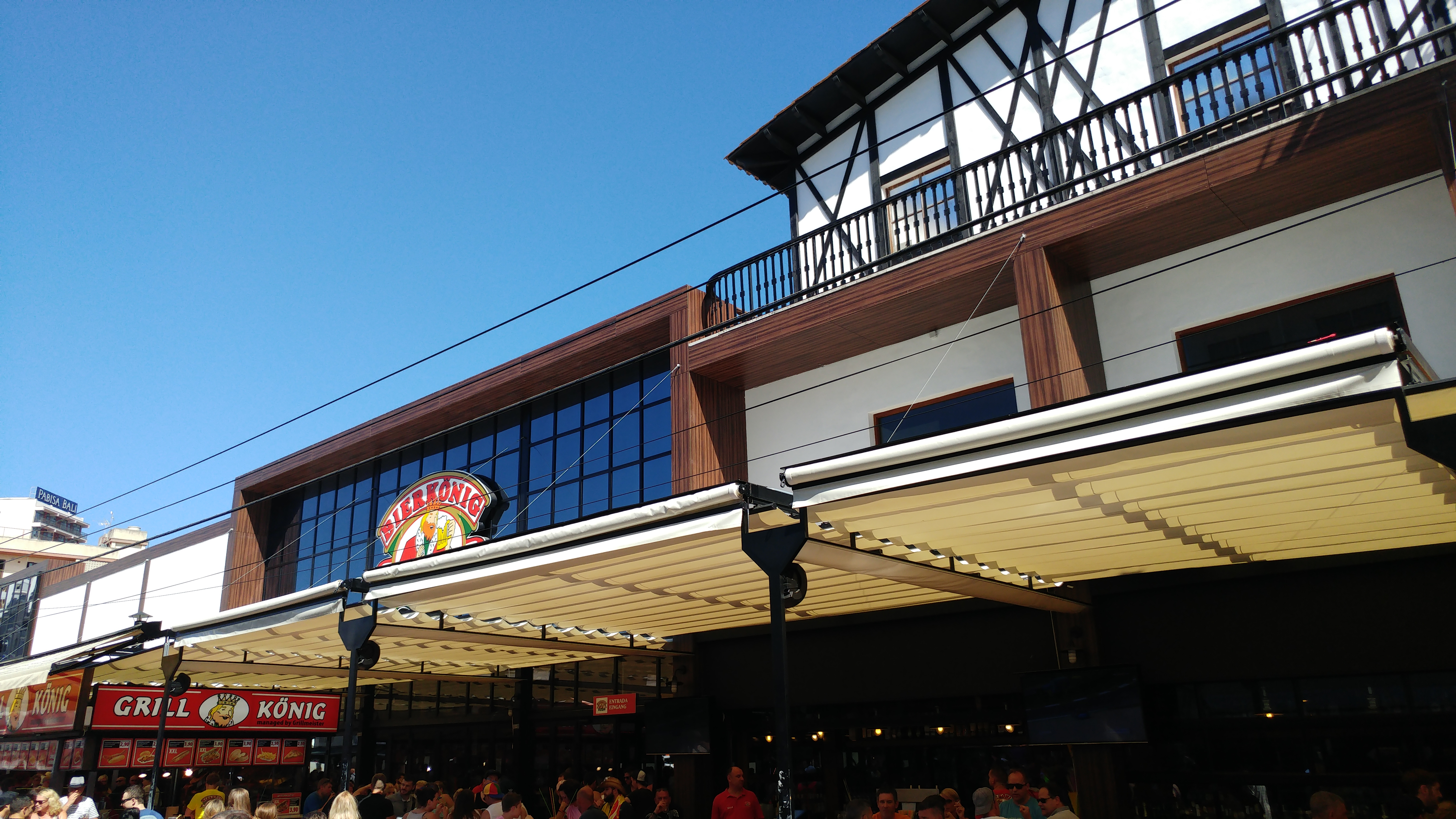
Bierkönig in Palma de Mallorca (2017)

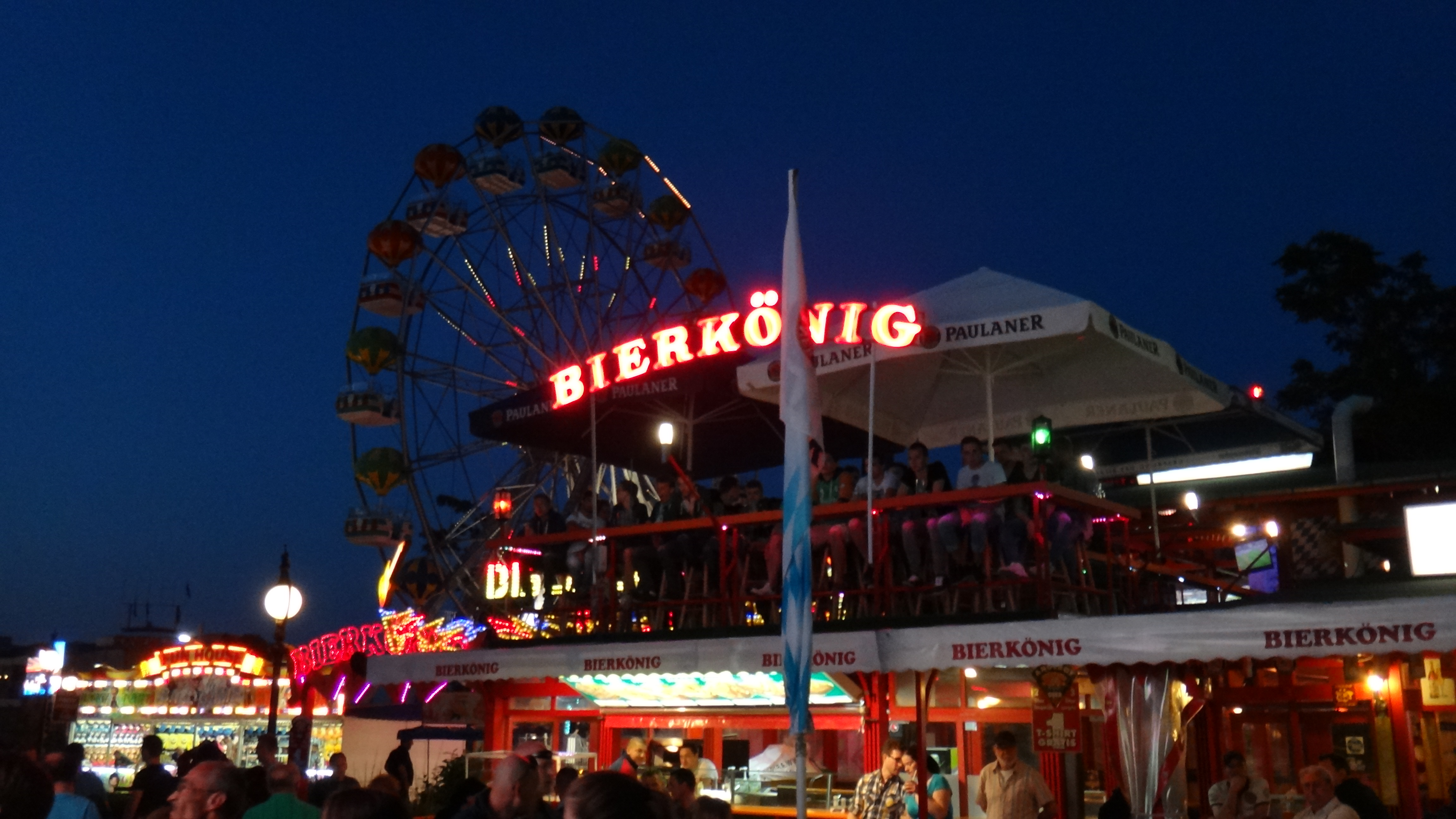
"Bierkönig" on the Golden Sands (2015)

Partyschlager is performed live at the Ballermann (Ballermann) club, i.e., in the Bierkönig, Mega-Park, and Oberbayern nightclubs in Palma de Mallorca, as well as in other venues on Mallorca, such as in Cala Millor, the Bierbrunnen in Cala Rajada, or Krümels Stadl in Cala Fornells. A second center emerged on the Bulgarian Golden Sands, where there are clubs named after the Ballermann bars, such as Bierkönig Bulgaria, Dolphin Mega-Park, and Ballerman 6 Beach Bar. In German-speaking countries, live partyschlager can be found at folk festivals, schlager festivals, parties, or parades such as the Hamburg Schlagermove, in après-ski bars (for example, in Ischgl), and in discos in rural areas. Partyschlager singers also perform on special editions of the ZDF Fernsehgarten.

Partyschlager songs are often released on compilations, for example, since 1995 in the Ballermann Hits series (EMI Electrola) and the Fetenhits series (Universal Music). The Ballermann Award has been presented since 2006, with entries from the Ballermann Awards appearing on compilations of the same name since 2013. The smago! Award, presented since 2011, includes categories such as "Wiesn Hit of the Year" and "Most Successful Party Hit Singer of the Year." Various editions of television shows such as "Die ultimative Chartshow" and "Deutschland sucht den Superstar" have had the "Ballermann" theme. Radio Paloma Partyschlager, Radio Hossa, and Radio Bollerwagen are livestream specialty channels on private radio stations that exclusively play party music. Party hits are rarely played on terrestrial radio.

== Differentiation from Schlager ==
According to ethnomusicologist Julio Mendívil, Guildo Horn's performance at the Eurovision Song Contest 1998 with the song "Guildo hat euch lieb!" contributed significantly to the development of party music. After that, the term "Schlager" split into the established German Schlager and Ballermann or après-ski music, which can hardly be classified as such anymore and contains elements of folk music and comedy. Mendívil observes three areas of Schlager: 1) a folk-oriented area, 2) a German Schlager area, and 3) a party music area. While Schlager and Ballermann or après-ski music as well as Schlager and the folk music sector influence each other, the interaction between party music and popular Schlager or Volkstümliche Musik is rather low.
