= Layla (DJ Robin & Schürze song) =

2022 song

Single by DJ Robin & Schürze
- Released: March 25, 2022
- Genre: Partyschlager
- Length: 3:07
- Label: Summerfield
- Songwriters: Michael Müller, Robin Leutner
- Producers: Dennis Geist, Thomas Wendt

"Layla" (German pronunciation: [ˈlaɪla]) is a song by DJ Robin & Schürze that reached number one on the music charts of Germany, Austria and Switzerland in the summer of 2022.

== Lyrics and music ==
The song is entirely in German and tells of what the singer recently having been approached on the street by the owner of a brothel whose madam is called Layla, a woman who is described as being "schöner, jünger, geiler" ("prettier, younger, sexier"; the word "geil", of which "geiler" is the comparative, is somewhat hard to translate into English, see the article on a 1986 song under that name).

The song belongs to the genre of so-called Partyschlager style songs. This kind of music is often played in large disco pubs and seaside resorts on Mallorca which are often frequented by younger visitors from German-speaking countries; on mainstream radio stations, however, this genre usually receives only very limited airplay.

== Reception ==
The song entered the German chart in the spring of 2022 and climbed to the top position within five weeks; later, the song entered the Austrian and Swiss charts where it eventually also went to number one.

Because of its success in these three countries, the song also entered the Billboard Global 200 chart where it reached #42.

== Controversy ==
After some concern of the song being "sexist" due to its lyrics, the song was recommended not to be played at volksfests in some cities, notably Würzburg, Düsseldorf and Munich. This was seen by many as an outright ban, which sparked a reaction by German Minister of Justice, Marco Buschmann, who stated on Twitter that while lyrics of this sort need not be liked by everyone, a ban by local authorities would be "a bit too much". Other public figures and musicians joined the debate, often defending artistic license and freedom of speech. The controversy around the song is believed to have contributed much to its success. Austrian radio station Ö3, which broadcasts the Austrian top 40 chart show every week, but does not play songs containing foul language (e.g. certain rap songs in German), decided to play "Layla" without any censoring; so did German TV station ZDF in a family show on daytime television.

== Charts ==
=== Weekly charts ===
Weekly chart performance for "Layla"
Chart (2022)	Peak position
Austria (Ö3 Austria Top 40)	1
Global 200 (Billboard)	42
Germany (GfK)	1
Switzerland (Schweizer Hitparade)	1

=== Year-end charts ===
2022 year-end chart performance for "Layla"
Chart (2022)	Position
Austria (Ö3 Austria Top 40)	16
Germany (Official German Charts)	1
Switzerland (Schweizer Hitparade)	30

== Certifications ==
Certifications for "Layla"
Region	Certification	Certified units/sales
Austria (IFPI Austria)	Platinum	30,000^{‡}
Germany (BVMI)	3× Gold	600,000^{‡}
Switzerland (IFPI Switzerland)	Platinum	20,000^{‡}
^{‡} Sales+streaming figures based on certification alone.

== Covers and renditions ==
The song has also been published in Dutch and in English. Additionally, instrumental covers by professional and amateur musicians have appeared on the Internet, including a rendition by a band from the Bundeswehr.
