= Ghost (Justin Bieber song) =

2021 single by Justin Bieber

Single by Justin Bieber

from the album Justice
- Released: September 10, 2021
- Genre: Pop rock; synth-pop
- Length: 2:33
- Label: Universal Music Group
- Songwriters: Justin Bieber; Jonathan Bellion; Jordan K. Johnson; Michael Pollack; Stefan Johnson
- Producers: Jon Bellion; The Monsters & Strangerz

Justin Bieber singles chronology
"Don't Go" (2021)	"Ghost" (2021)	"Rockin' Around the Christmas Tree" (2021)

Music video
- "Ghost" on YouTube

"Ghost" is a song by Canadian singer Justin Bieber. It was sent to French radio stations through Universal Music Group as the sixth and final single from his sixth studio album, Justice, on September 10, 2021. Bieber wrote the song with Jon Bellion and the Monsters & Strangerz (Jordan K. Johnson and Stefan Johnson), alongside Michael Pollack. An uptempo pop rock and synth-pop ballad with influences from grime, EDM, and drum and bass, the song combines folky acoustic guitar, intricate programmed drums, and shimmering EDM synthesizers. Producing a sound that leans into adult contemporary, Bieber lyrically explores the grief and longing from the absence of a loved one.

"Ghost" received critical acclaim as a standout track on Justice, praised for its emotional depth, powerful instrumentation, and unique production that balances themes of grief, hope, and lasting love. While some critics found it less impactful, its lyrical quality and vocal performance were widely celebrated. Commercially, it reached number one in Malaysia and Singapore and charted within the top ten in Canada, Indonesia, Ireland, Lebanon, the Philippines, and the United States.

== Background ==
Jon Bellion, who wrote the lyrics, originally sent a demo of "Ghost" directly to Bieber. Co-writer/producer Stefan Johnson then sent a copy to producer/engineer Josh Gudwin, who stated "It was one of the songs you hear and you know there’s something special about it [...] I knew it was going to resonate deeply with Justin."

Bieber explained that his objective with "Ghost" was to "make people feel like there is hope and that the trauma and the hurt that you feel isn't gonna last forever". In a Zoom playback of Justice, he acknowledged that 2020 "has been a really challenging year where we've lost loved ones and relationships" during the COVID-19 pandemic. Bieber went on to say that the song's hook "works for this quarantine situation" since "we're not relating and connecting in the same way", which in turn "has allowed us to only really have these memories". On February 20, 2022, American singer-songwriter Jon Bellion, who was involved in the songwriting and production of "Ghost", also explained through a tweet that he wrote the song about his late grandmother.

== Composition and lyrics ==
"Ghost" is an uptempo grime influenced pop rock and synth-pop ballad. The song is set in the key of D major with a tempo of 77 beats per minute. It meshes electronic dance music (EDM) with drum and bass and makes use of a folky acoustic guitar, busy programmed drums, and shimmering EDM synthesizers. Uproxx's Bianca Gracie described the track as leaning into the adult contemporary genre "with its radio-friendly acoustic guitar riffs". The song's chattering beats give way to an acoustic guitar strum before the two sounds are brought together on the chorus. Lyrically, "Ghost" deals with grief caused by the absence of a loved one, with Bieber singing: "I'll settle for the ghost of you / I miss you more than life." Catherine Walthall of American Songwriter remarked that the song does not "exclusively serve in an elegiac fashion", in that while it is likely about losing a loved one to death, it can also act "as a comfort for those battling the woes of long-distance or separation".

== Promotion ==
To promote "Ghost", Bieber teamed up with Dolby Laboratories to create a long-form commercial for Dolby Atmos including the song. A day later, Billboard chart director Gary Trust announced that the song started being officially promoted to US pop radio. Bieber performed the song at the 2021 MTV Video Music Awards, where he sported a hoodie covering most of his face and was accompanied on set by large ice blocks.

== Critical reception ==
The song received critical acclaim by music critics. Allison Stewart of The Washington Post saw "Ghost" as the best song on Justice, writing that the "rafter-rattling ballad" is "perfectly suited to the unique concerns of quarantine". Similarly, Los Angeles Times pop music critic Mikael Wood considered it one of the album's highlights, noting that the song's drums "punches up a vaguely creepy emo sentiment". Jason Lipshutz of Billboard listed it ninth in his ranking of the best songs on Justice, believing that "Bieber drops one of the best vocal performances on the album here and carries the concept through". The Evening Standard's David Smyth felt the song's synths were one of the many musically enjoyable aspects on Justice. NME's Will Lavin wrote that the track "hits hard but imparts a healing guitar riff to cushion the blow". Anna Clara Ribeiro from PopMatters found it to be the most intriguing song on Justice in terms of production, specifying "not so much for any of the sounds that prevail in it", but rather "for where each of them is placed". Ribeiro also called it a good lyrical moment of the album. Baby A. Gil of The Philippine Star thought the song "effortlessly juggles grief and hope while depicting forever love". Consequence of Sound's Valerie Magan was less positive about the track, feeling its "impact remains as barren as the imagery".

== Commercial performance ==
Upon the release of Justice, "Ghost" charted at number 41 on the Billboard Global 200. It entered several record charts worldwide, including Australia (53), Bieber's home country of Canada (27), Denmark (25), Portugal (114), Slovakia (58), and Sweden (72). In the United States, the song debuted at number 66 on the Billboard Hot 100 as one of the 11 new entrances off Justice. Following its promotion to pop radio as a single, the song peaked at number two on the Canadian Hot 100 and number 16 on the Billboard Global 200. On the Billboard Hot 100 chart dated February 19, 2022, "Ghost" rose to number nine in its 20th charting week, garnering 62 million airplay impressions, 7.9 million streams, and 3,400 sales. The song earned Bieber his 26th top-ten hit and made him hold the 11th-most top-ten entries in the chart's history. It additionally became his longest climb to reach the top ten, surpassing the 18-week ascent of his 2015 collaboration with American record producers Skrillex and Diplo, "Where Are Ü Now". The song hit a new peak of number eight the following week while concurrently becoming Bieber's 10th number one on the US Mainstream Top 40, the most among solo males on the chart. "Ghost" peaked at number five on the Billboard Hot 100 chart dated April 2, 2022, giving Bieber his 20th top-five hit and making him only the 10th act to reach the threshold. The song also found considerable success in Maritime Southeast Asia, reaching number one in Malaysia and Singapore, number two in Indonesia, and number six in the Philippines. As of March 17, 2022, "Ghost" has amassed 255 million streams in the US and 830 million streams worldwide.

== Music video ==
The official music video for "Ghost", directed by Colin Tilley, premiered on October 8, 2021. It coincided with the release of the complete edition of Justice and the Amazon Prime Video documentary, Justin Bieber: Our World. Actress Diane Keaton stars as Bieber's grandmother in the video. The video opens with Bieber playing the piano, celebrating his grandfather's birthday with him and Keaton. The moment is interrupted in the next scene as Bieber and Keaton mourn the death of his grandfather at an ocean-side funeral. Two years after the event, Bieber sees Keaton is still struggling with her husband's death. He decides to take Keaton for a night out on the town as they attempt to move past their grief. Bieber buys a Gucci dress for Keaton to cheer her up, and they partake in activities such as going on long walks along Ventura Beach and taking shots, toasting, and dancing at a bar. Bieber later encourages Keaton to date again as she looks for eligible bachelors on a dating app called Slide. Bieber then drives Keaton to the beach in a convertible, where she scatters her husband's ashes in the ocean while dolphins jump up to greet them. At the end of the video, Bieber surprises Keaton by setting her up on a date with a new man who slightly resembles her departed husband.

Bieber called Keaton and asked her to be in the video, to which she accepted the offer and expressed fondness for the song. Keaton previously shared a brief interaction with Bieber in 2015 during her appearance on The Ellen DeGeneres Show and admitted having a slight crush on him after being shown his Calvin Klein campaign. On October 6, 2021, Bieber and Keaton shared a teaser of the video on their respective Instagram accounts. Speaking about her experience working with Bieber, Keaton said it was "friendly, open, loose and unique", adding that he "was kind to everyone and his team was perfection". While Keaton had never been in a music video before, she directed two of them for Belinda Carlisle's singles, "Heaven Is a Place on Earth" and "I Get Weak".

== Credits and personnel ==
Credits adapted from Tidal.

- Justin Bieber – vocals, songwriting
- Jon Bellion – songwriting, production, backing vocals, engineering, programming, vocal production
- The Monsters & Strangerz – production, bass, drums, keyboards, programming
  - Jordan K. Johnson – songwriting
  - Stefan Johnson – songwriting, vocal production
- Michael Pollack – songwriting
- Heidi Wang – assistant mixing, engineering
- Ryan Lytle – assistant recording engineering
- Pierre-Luc Rioux – guitar
- Colin Leonard – mastering
- Josh Gudwin – mixing, vocal production

== Charts ==
=== Weekly charts ===
2021–2022 weekly chart performance for "Ghost"
Chart (2021–2022)	Peak position
Australia (ARIA)	11
Austria (Ö3 Austria Top 40)	75
Belgium (Ultratop 50 Flanders)	28
Canada Hot 100 (Billboard)	2
Canada AC (Billboard)	3
Canada CHR/Top 40 (Billboard)	2
Canada Hot AC (Billboard)	1
Croatia International Airplay (HRT)	13
Czech Republic Airplay (ČNS IFPI)	6
Czech Republic Singles Digital (ČNS IFPI)	87
Denmark (Tracklisten)	25
Germany (GfK)	79
Global 200 (Billboard)	16
Greece International (IFPI)	44
Hungary (Rádiós Top 40)	20
Iceland (Tónlistinn)	14
Indonesia (Billboard)	2
Ireland (IRMA)	7
Japan Hot Overseas (Billboard)	7
Lebanon Airplay (Lebanese Top 20)	2
Lithuania (AGATA)	49
Malaysia (Billboard)	1
Malaysia International (RIM)	1
Mexico (Billboard Mexican Airplay)	42
Netherlands (Dutch Top 40)	16
Netherlands (Single Top 100)	23
New Zealand (Recorded Music NZ)	16
Philippines (Billboard)	6
Portugal (AFP)	44
San Marino (SMRRTV Top 50)	44
Singapore (RIAS)	1
Slovakia Singles Digital (ČNS IFPI)	58
South Africa Streaming (TOSAC)	37
Sweden (Sverigetopplistan)	72
Switzerland (Schweizer Hitparade)	83
UK Singles (Official Charts)	19
US Billboard Hot 100	5
US Adult Contemporary (Billboard)	5
US Adult Pop Airplay (Billboard)	1
US Dance Airplay (Billboard)	5
US Pop Airplay (Billboard)	1
US Rhythmic Airplay (Billboard)	39
US Rolling Stone Top 100	32

2026 weekly chart performance for "Ghost"
Chart (2026)	Peak position
Philippines Hot 100 (Billboard Philippines)	63
Taiwan (Billboard)	11

=== Year-end charts ===
2021 year-end chart performance for "Ghost"
Chart (2021)	Position
Denmark (Tracklisten)	161
Netherlands (Dutch Top 40)	94

2022 year-end chart performance for "Ghost"
Chart (2022)	Position
Australia (ARIA)	13
Belgium (Ultratop 50 Flanders)	92
Canada (Canadian Hot 100)	7
Denmark (Tracklisten)	55
Global 200 (Billboard)	19
Iceland (Tónlistinn)	36
Netherlands (Dutch Top 40)	86
New Zealand (Recorded Music NZ)	26
Portugal (AFP)	73
Singapore (RIAS)	1
UK Singles (OCC)	63
US Billboard Hot 100	8
US Adult Contemporary (Billboard)	6
US Adult Top 40 (Billboard)	2
US Dance/Mix Show Airplay (Billboard)	15
US Mainstream Top 40 (Billboard)	7

2023 year-end chart performance for "Ghost"
Chart (2023)	Position
US Adult Contemporary (Billboard)	48

== Certifications ==
Certifications for "Ghost"
Region	Certification	Certified units/sales
Australia (ARIA)	6× Platinum	420,000^{‡}
Brazil (Pro-Música Brasil)	Diamond	160,000^{‡}
Canada (Music Canada)	2× Platinum	160,000^{‡}
Denmark (IFPI Danmark)	2× Platinum	180,000^{‡}
France (SNEP)	Platinum	200,000^{‡}
Germany (BVMI)	Gold	200,000^{‡}
Italy (FIMI)	Platinum	100,000^{‡}
New Zealand (RMNZ)	4× Platinum	120,000^{‡}
Nigeria (TCSN)	Silver	25,000^{‡}
Norway (IFPI Norway)	Gold	30,000^{‡}
Poland (ZPAV)	Platinum	50,000^{‡}
Portugal (AFP)	Platinum	10,000^{‡}
Spain (Promusicae)	Platinum	60,000^{‡}
United Kingdom (BPI)	2× Platinum	1,200,000^{‡}
United States (RIAA)	3× Platinum	3,000,000^{‡}
Streaming
Greece (IFPI Greece)	Gold	1,000,000^{†}
Japan (RIAJ)	Gold	50,000,000^{†}
Sweden (GLF)	Gold	4,000,000^{†}
^{‡} Sales+streaming figures based on certification alone.^{†} Streaming-only figures based on certification alone.

== Release history ==
Release dates and formats for "Ghost"
Region	Date	Format	Label	Ref.
France	September 10, 2021	Radio airplay	Universal	
United States	September 13, 2021	Contemporary hit radio	Def Jam	
Italy	October 8, 2021	Radio airplay	Universal	

== See also ==
- List of number-one songs of 2022 (Malaysia)
- List of number-one songs of 2021 (Singapore)
- List of number-one songs of 2022 (Singapore)
