= Box of Secrets =

Box of Secrets may refer to:

- Box of Secrets (Blood Red Shoes album), 2008 album by British alternative rock band Blood Red Shoes
- Box of Secrets (Zarif album), 2010 album by the singer/songwriter Zarif
  - "Box of Secrets" (song), a song from the above album by Zarif
