= Betmead =

Betmead is an English surname. Notable people with the surname include:

- Harry Betmead (1912–1984), English footballer, grandfather of Dominic
- Dominic Betmead, British record producer, songwriter, guitarist, and DJ
