= Kid Harpoon =

British songwriter and producer (born 1982)

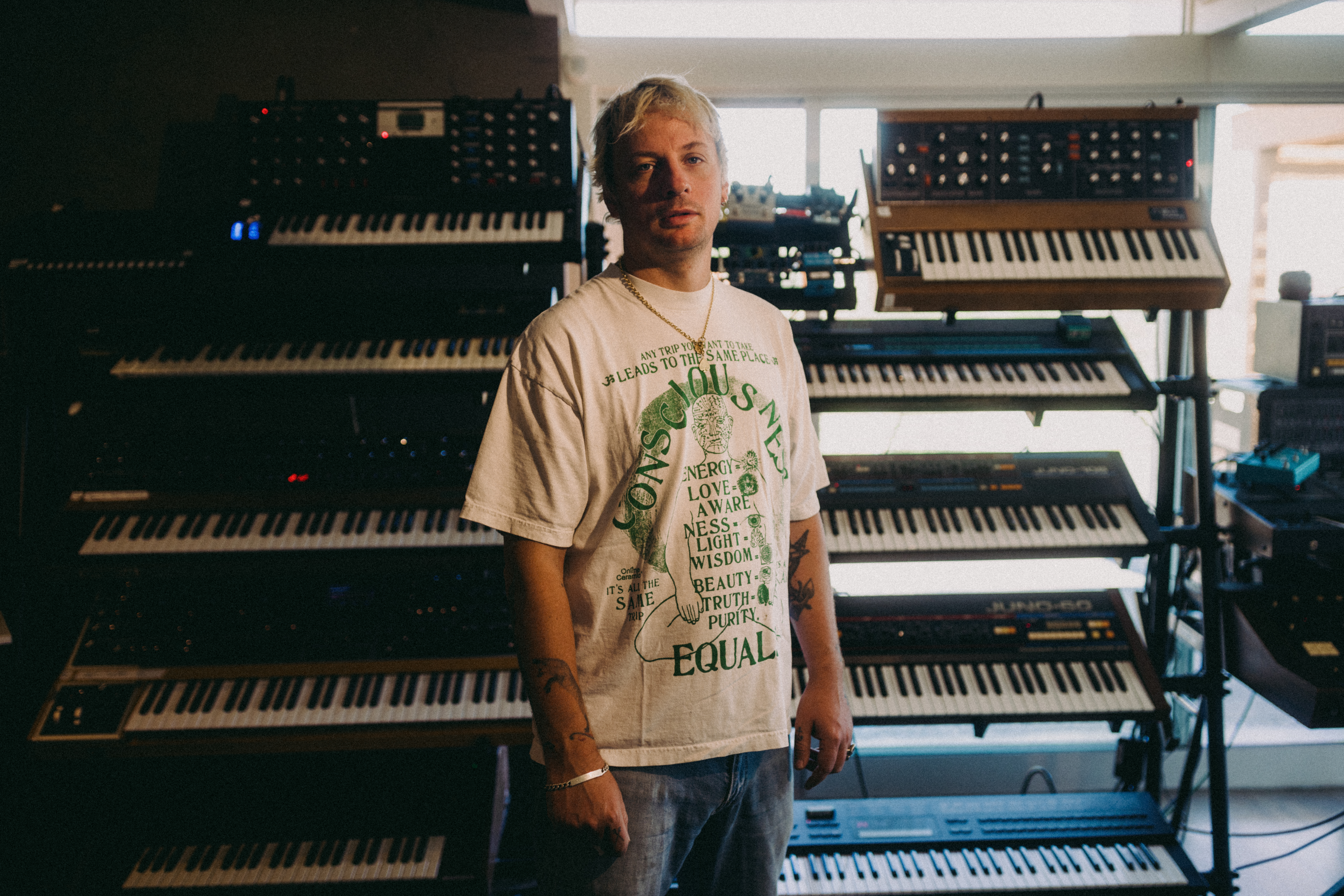

Background information
- Also known as: Tom Hull
- Born: Thomas Edward Percy Hull; 20 April 1982 (age 44); Chatham, Kent, England
- Genres: Pop; indie; alternative; rock; country
- Occupations: Music producer; songwriter; multi-instrumentalist
- Instruments: Vocals; guitar
- Years active: 2002–present

Thomas Edward Percy Hull (born 20 April 1982), known professionally as Kid Harpoon, is an English songwriter, record producer, and musician. In 2023, he won the Grammy Award for Album of the Year and the Brit Award for Songwriter of the Year for his work on Harry’s House by Harry Styles. The album’s single “As It Was” spent 15 weeks at No. 1 on the Billboard Hot 100, became the UK’s best-selling single of 2022, and has surpassed 5.5 billion global streams.

He was also behind Miley Cyrus’ global hit “Flowers,” which broke Spotify’s all-time streaming records in back-to-back weeks and won both Record of the Year & Best Pop Solo Performance at the 2024 GRAMMYS. The track has now exceeded 4 billion streams worldwide.

In 2026, he was the executive producer for Harry Styles’ fourth album, Kiss All the Time. Disco, Occasionally. The album went on to debut at No. 1 on Billboard 200 Chart.

== Career ==
Already a fixture at local venues in his hometown of Chatham, Kid Harpoon first emerged on the London live music scene in early 2006 as a resident singer-songwriter at Nambucca. His first single, "The River, The Ocean, The Pearl" was released by independent label Brikabrak in 2006 to critical acclaim, earning an instant following from tastemakers NME and Drowned in Sound. Two EPs followed, The First EP, in October 2007, and The Second EP in February 2008.

Upon signing to influential label Young Turks, Kid Harpoon's debut album Once was released in September 2009. The album was recorded in Los Angeles by producer Trevor Horn and received an 8/10 from NME.

Kid Harpoon has also worked with an array of artists. He co-wrote "Shake It Out", "Never Let Me Go", and "Leave My Body" on the Florence + the Machine album Ceremonials with Paul Epworth and Florence Welch. He also co-wrote Calvin Harris's number one single Sweet Nothing with Florence Welch and Harris. Additional writing credits include "The Devil in Me" for Jamie N Commons and three songs on Jessie Ware's debut album Devotion including the single "Wildest Moments".

In 2012, Kid Harpoon received an Ivor Novello nomination for Florence + the Machine's "Shake It Out".

Kid Harpoon co-wrote and produced Harry Styles's 2022 album, Harry's House, including the number one Billboard Hot 100 best-selling global single of 2022, "As It Was". The album won the Grammy Award for Album of the Year at the 65th Annual Grammy Awards. He co-produced Miley Cyrus' best-selling global single of 2023, "Flowers", which similarly reached number one on the Billboard Hot 100 chart and won the Grammy Award for Record of the Year. He has also written hit songs for Maggie Rogers, Carín León, Jessie Ware, David Byrne, Florence and the Machine and many more.

In 2024, Harpoon produced the Kings of Leon’s ninth studio album, “’Can We Please Have Fun” to widespread critical acclaim. This album represented Kid Harpoon’s first time working with the band. The fusion of Harpoon’s Pop and Indie background helped the album debut at No. 6. on Billboard’s Top 10 Album Sales and peak at No. 2 on Billboard’s official album chart.

Quickly following, Harpoon went into the studio with the Irish rock band, Inhaler. Producing all 14 tracks, the album “Open Wide”, which debuted at No.2 on the UK Albums Chart, earning the band its third top-ten effort on the charts and entered atop the Irish Albums Chart, marking their third consecutive number one in the native country.

In 2025, Harpoon produced the entirety of David Byrne’s ninth studio album; “Who Is the Sky?” Byrne’s first album back after seven years included collaborations with Paramore’s Hayley Williams, St. Vincent and drummer Tom Skinner.

In 2026, Kid Harpoon Executive Produced Harry Styles’ fourth album, “Kiss All The Time. Disco, Occasionally.” The album was a universal success, selling over a million global units in its first week and debuting No. 1 in 20 different territories. It marked the most US first week vinyl sales for a male artist in the modern era, a record previously set by Styles’ preceding album, “Harry’s House.”

Finally, Kid Harpoon currently sits as the first ever Producer in Residence at Abbey Road Studios; granting him full access to the studio’s home along with its vintage gear. This residency allows Harpoon to become an active member of the Abbey Road’s educational programs, panels, and workshops.

== Personal life ==
Hull married his long-time girlfriend Jenny Myles at Dairsie Castle in Scotland on 15 May 2015.

== Solo discography ==
=== Studio albums ===
Title	Track list	Details
Once	1. Stealing Cars; 2. Colours; 3. Back From Beyond; 4. Buried Alive; 5. Burnt Down House; 6. Flowers by the Shore; 7. Once; 8. Hold On; 9. Running Through Tunnels; 10. Death of a Rose; 11. Marianna; 12. Childish Dreaming	Released: 28 September 2009; Label: Young Turks; Formats: Digital download, CD, vinyl

=== Extended plays ===
Title	Track list	Details
The First EP	1. Milkmaid; 2. 57; 3. As it Always Was; 4. Aeroplanes and Neon Lights; 5. Small Town War; 6. The Water (Demo)	Released: 2007; Label: Young Turks; Formats: CD, vinyl
The Second EP	1. Riverside; 2. Fathers and Sons; 3. Suicide Grandad; 4. Her Body Sways; 5. In the Dark; 6. Lay of the Land	Released: 18 February 2008; Label: Young Turks; Formats: CD, vinyl

=== Singles ===
Title	Track list	Details
The River, The Ocean, The Pearl	1. Riverside; 2. It's Time	Released: 2007; Label: Brikabrak; Formats: CD, vinyl
Back From Beyond	1. Back From Beyond; 2. Once	Released: 5 October 2009; Label: Young Turks; Formats: CD, vinyl; Featuring on "Once" : Katie Melua and Smoke Fairies

== Songwriting and production credits ==
Year	Artist	Song	Written with	Produced with	Album
2009	The Jacka	"Storm" feat. Cormega	N/A	N/A	Tear Gas
2011	Florence + the Machine	"Never Let Me Go"	Florence Welch; Paul Epworth	N/A	Ceremonials
2011	Florence + the Machine	"Leave My Body"	Florence Welch; Paul Epworth	N/A	Ceremonials
2012	Jamie N Commons	"Devil in Me"	Jamie Nick Commons	No additional producers	Non-album single
2012	Spector	"Celestine"	N/A	Trevor Horn	Enjoy It While It Lasts
2012	Jessie Ware	"Wildest Moments"	Jessica Ware	Dave Okumu	Devotion
2012	Spector	"Twenty Nothing"	N/A	No additional producers	Enjoy It While It Lasts
2012	Jessie Ware	"Night Light"	Jessica Ware; Dave Okumu	Dave Okumu	Devotion
2012	Jessie Ware	"Taking in Water"	Jessica Ware	Dave Okumu	Devotion
2012	Calvin Harris	"Sweet Nothing" feat. Florence Welch	Adam Wiles; Florence Welch	N/A	18 Months
2012	Jack Beats	"Storm" feat. Kid Harpoon		N/A	Somebody to Love EP
2013	Miles Kane	"Give Up"	Miles Kane	N/A	Give Up EP
2013	Jamie N Commons	"Wash Me in the Water"	Jamie Nick Commons	N/A	Rumble and Sway EP
2013	Lewis Watson	"It Could Be Better"	Lewis Watson	N/A	The Wild EP
2013	Florence + the Machine	"Over the Love"	Florence Welch; Aaron Jerome; Stuart Hammond	Emile Haynie; Baz Luhrmann	The Great Gatsby OST
2013	Joel Compass	"Fucked Up"	Joel Compass	Joel Compass	Astronaut EP
2013	Miles Kane	"Tonight"	Miles Kane	N/A	Don't Forget Who You Are
2013	Miles Kane	"Caught in the Act"	Miles Kane	N/A	Don't Forget Who You Are
2013	Mayer Hawthorne	"Robot Love"	Andrew Cohen; John Hill; William Curtis	Mayer Hawthorne; John Hill (co.)	Where Does This Door Go
2013	Professor Green	"Are You Getting Enough?" feat. Miles Kane	Stephen Manderson; Miles Kane	No additional producers	Growing Up in Public
2013	Birdy	"Light Me Up"	Jasmine Bogaerde	N/A	Fire Within
2013	Haim	"Days Are Gone"	Danielle Haim; Alana Haim; Este Haim; Jessica Ware	N/A	Days Are Gone
2013	Eliza Doolittle	"Back Packing"	Eliza Caird	No additional producers	In Your Hands
2013	Eliza Doolittle	"Walking on Water"	Eliza Caird	No additional producers	In Your Hands
2013	Eliza Doolittle	"Missing Kissing"	Eliza Caird	No additional producers	In Your Hands
2013	Eliza Doolittle	"One in a Bed"	N/A	Eliot James	In Your Hands
2013	Bipolar Sunshine	"Drowning Butterflies"	Adio Marchant	No additional producers	Drowning Butterflies EP
2014	Shakira	"Nunca Me Acuerdo de Olvidarte"	Daniel Alexander; Erik Hassle; Shakira; John Hill; Jorge Drexler	Shakira; John Hill	Shakira
2014	Shakira	"Can't Remember to Forget You" feat. Rihanna	Shakira Ripoll; Kaj Hassle; Daniel Ledinsky; John Hill; Robyn Fenty	Shakira; John Hill; Kuk Harrell (voc.)	Shakira
2014	Foxes	"Let Go for Tonight"	Louisa Allen	Mike Spencer; Future Cut (add.); Ben Preston (add.)	Glorious
2014	Skrillex	"Fire Away" feat. Kid Harpoon	Sonny Moore	N/A	Recess
2014	Christina Perri	"Burning Gold"	Christina Perri	N/A	Head or Heart
2014	Lily Allen	"Bass Like Home"	Lily Cooper	No additional producers	Non-album single
2014	LP	"One Last Mistake"	Laura Pergolizzi	N/A	Forever for Now
2014	Years & Years	"Take Shelter"	Oliver Thornton; Michael Goldsworthy; Emre Turkmen	N/A	Communion
2014	Professor Green	"Little Secrets" feat. Mr. Probz	Stephen Manderson	Alex "Cores" Hayes	Growing Up in Public
2014	Years & Years	"Desire" solo or feat. Tove Lo	Oliver Thornton; Michael Goldsworthy; Emre Turkmen; Ebba Tove Nilsson (remix)	N/A	Communion
2014	Jessie Ware	"Desire"	Jessica Ware; Daniel Daley; Mitchum Chin; Paul Jeffries	N/A	Tough Love
2014	Rae Morris	"Closer"	Rachel Morris	N/A	Unguarded
2014	Brooke Fraser	"Je Suis Pret"	Brooke Ligertwood	N/A	Brutal Romantic
2014	Quvenzhané Wallis	"Who Am I?" with Jamie Foxx and Cameron Diaz	Sia Furler; Greg Kurstin; William Gluck	N/A	Annie OST
2014	James Bay	"Collide"	James Bay	N/A	Chaos and the Calm
2014	James Bay	"Wait in Line"	James Bay	N/A	Hold Back the River EP
2015	Florence + the Machine	"What Kind of Man"	Florence Welch; John Hill	N/A	How Big, How Blue, How Beautiful
2015	Years & Years	"Gold"	Oliver Thornton; Michael Goldsworthy; Emre Turkmen; Mark Ralph	Mark Ralph Years & Years	Communion
2015	Years & Years	"Worship"	Oliver Thornton; Michael Goldsworthy; Emre Turkmen; Thomas Barnes; Peter Kelleher; Benjamin Kohn	N/A	Communion
2015	Sigma	"Higher" feat. Labrinth	Wayne Hector; Thomas Barnes; Peter Kelleher; Benjamin Kohn	N/A	Life
2015	Denai Moore	"Absent"	Denai Moore	N/A	Elsewhere
2015	Florence + the Machine	"Ship to Wreck"	Florence Welch	Markus Dravs	How Big, How Blue, How Beautiful
2015	Florence + the Machine	"Make Up Your Mind"	Florence Welch	Charlie Hugall	How Big, How Blue, How Beautiful
2015	Gin Wigmore	"In My Way"	Virginia Wigmore	N/A	Blood to Bone
2015	Tourist	"Holding On" feat. Josef Salvat and Niia	William Phillips	N/A	Non-album single
2015	Omi	"Babylon"	John Ryan II	John Ryan	Me 4 U
2015	James Morrison	"Naked with You"	James Morrison; Timothy Bran; Roy Kerr	N/A	Higher Than Here
2016	Years & Years	"Meteorite"	Oliver Thornton; Michael Goldsworthy; Emre Turkmen	Mark Ralph	"Bridget Jones's Baby" Original Motion Picture Soundtrack
2016	Foxes	"Cruel"	Louisa Allen	N/A	All I Need
2016	Foxes	"Shoot Me Down"	Louisa Allen; Jonas Quant	N/A	All I Need
2016	Aurora	"Home"	Daniel Wilson	N/A	All My Demons Greeting Me as a Friend
2016	JP Cooper	"Five More Days" feat. Avelino	John Paul Cooper; Achi Avelino	No additional producers	Non-album single
2016	Simonne Jones	"Gravity" original and remix	Simonne Jones	No additional producers	Gravity EP
2016	Banks & Steelz	"Giant"	Paul Banks; Robert Diggs; John Hill	John Hill	Anything But Words
2016	AlunaGeorge	"Wanderlust"	Aluna Francis; George Reid; John Hill; Ajay Bhattacharya	N/A	I Remember
2016	Shawn Mendes	"Roses"	Shawn Mendes; Tobias Jesso Jr.	N/A	Illuminate
2017	Lea Michele	"Heavy Love"	Alexandra Hughes; Christopher Braide	N/A	Places
2017	Harry Styles	"Sweet Creature"	Harry Styles	Tyler Johnson (add.); Alex Salibian (add.); Jeff Bhasker (add.)	Harry Styles
2017	Niia	"Hurt You First"	Niia Bertino; Robin Hannibal	N/A	I
2017	Harry Styles	"Carolina"	Harry Styles; Ryan Nasci; Mitch Rowland; Tyler Johnson; Alex Salibian; Jeff Bhasker	Tyler Johnson; Alex Salibian; Jeff Bhasker	Harry Styles
2017	Mabel	"Bedroom"	Mabel McVey; Sarah Aarons	Josh Crocker; Cameron Gower Poole	Bedroom EP
2017	Portugal. The Man	"Easy Tiger"	John Gourley; Michael Hart; Ammar Malik; John Hill; Ajay Bhattacharya	N/A	Woodstock
2017	PVRIS	"No Mercy"	Brian MacDonald; Lindsay Gunnulfsen; Blake Harnage	N/A	AWKOH, AWNOH
2017	Jessie Ware	"Alone"	Jessica Ware; Sarah Aarons	ST!NT	Glasshouse
2017	Mabel	"Ivy"	Mabel McVey; Cameron Gower Poole; Brian Kennedy	N/A	Ivy to Roses
2017	Jessie Ware	"Thinking About You"	Jessica Ware	Sammy Witte (add.)	Glasshouse
2017	Kailee Morgue	"Discovery"	Kailee Morgue; Christopher Baran	N/A	Medusa EP
2018	Years & Years	"Sanctify"	Oliver Thornton	No additional producers	Palo Santo
2018	Seeb	"Drink About" feat. Dagny	Simen Eriksrud; Espen Berg; Sarah Aarons; Alexandra Robotham	N/A	Nice to Meet You EP
2018	Plan B	"Grateful"	Benjamin Drew; Dominic Betmead; Ellis Taylor	N/A	Heaven Before All Hell Breaks Loose
2018	Lykke Li	"Sex Money Feelings Die REMIX" feat. Lil Baby, snowsa	Rick Nowels; Dacoury Natche; Dominique Jones; Ilsey Juber; James Ryan Ho; Lykke Li; Sarah Aarons; Verneisha Snow	Malay; DJ Dahi	So Sad So Sexy
2018	Lykke Li	"Sex Money Feelings Die"	Li Zachrisson; Ilsey Juber; Sarah Aarons; James Ryan Ho; Dacoury Natche	Malay; DJ Dahi	So Sad So Sexy
2018	Lykke Li	"Bad Woman"	N/A	Malay	So Sad So Sexy
2018	Years & Years	"Don't Panic"	Oliver Thornton	No additional producers	Palo Santo
2018	Noah Cyrus	"Mad at You" with Gallant	Noah Cyrus; Sarah Aarons	Jenna Andrews	Good Cry EP
2018	Maggie Rogers	"Light On"	Maggie Rogers; Greg Kurstin	Greg Kurstin; Maggie Rogers (add.)	Heard It in a Past Life
2018	Lauren Jauregui	"Expectations"	N/A	No additional producers	Non-album single
2018	Junior Empire	"Danger"	Diego Porto Belmonte; Hannah Van Den Brul; Jack Balfour Scott; James Eliot; Joey Arnold Zapata; Jonas Jeberg; Jordan Grispino	Mark Rankin	Junior Empire
2019	Kiesza	"Sweet Love"	Kiesa Rae Ellestad; Philippe Sly; Kasper Falkenberg; Nicholas Furdal	NamahFalcon	Crave
2019	Radio Fluke	"Medicine"	Harry Styles	No additional producers	Radio Fluke EP
2019	Lykke Li	"Neon"	Li Zachrisson	No additional producers	Still Sad Still Sexy EP
2019	Lykke Li	"So Sad So Sexy (Alt.)"	N/A	No additional producers	Still Sad Still Sexy EP
2019	Lykke Li	"Deep End (Alt.)"	N/A	No additional producers	Still Sad Still Sexy EP
2019	Wrabel	"Magic"	Stephen Wrabel	No additional producers	One of Those Happy People EP
2019	Patrick Martin	"Both of You"	Patrick Martin; Jesse Mason	Jesse Mason	Non-album single
2019	Alfie Templeman	"Used to Love"	Alfie Templeman	Alfie Templeman	Don't Go Wasting Time EP
2019	Harry Styles	"Lights Up"	Harry Styles; Tyler Johnson	Tyler Johnson	Fine Line
2019	Grace Carter	"Fired Up"	Grace Carter; George Flint; Henry Flint	The 23rd DetoNate (add.)	Non-album single
2019	King Princess	"If You Think It's Love"	Mikaela Straus	King Princess	Cheap Queen
2019	Jessie Ware	"Mirage (Don't Stop)"	Jessica Ware; Clarence Coffee Jr. James Ford; Matthew Tavares; Benjamin Bernstead; Keren Woodward; Sara Dallin; Siobhan Fahey; Steven Jolley; Anthony Swain	N/A	What's Your Pleasure?
2019	Harry Styles	"Golden"	Harry Styles; Mitch Rowland; Tyler Johnson	Tyler Johnson	Fine Line
2019	Harry Styles	"Adore You"	Harry Styles; Amy Allen; Tyler Johnson	Tyler Johnson (co.)	Fine Line
2019	Harry Styles	"Watermelon Sugar"	Harry Styles; Mitch Rowland; Tyler Johnson	Tyler Johnson	Fine Line
2019	Harry Styles	"Cherry"	Harry Styles; Sammy Witte; Jeff Bhasker; Tyler Johnson	Tyler Johnson; Sammy Witte	Fine Line
2019	Harry Styles	"Falling"	Harry Styles	Tyler Johnson (add.)	Fine Line
2019	Harry Styles	"To Be So Lonely"	Harry Styles; Mitch Rowland; Tyler Johnson	Tyler Johnson	Fine Line
2019	Harry Styles	"She"	Harry Styles; Mitch Rowland; Jeff Bhasker	Tyler Johnson (co.)	Fine Line
2019	Harry Styles	"Sunflower, Vol. 6"	Harry Styles; Greg Kurstin	N/A	Fine Line
2019	Harry Styles	"Canyon Moon"	Harry Styles; Mitch Rowland	Tyler Johnson (add.)	Fine Line
2019	Harry Styles	"Fine Line"	Harry Styles; Mitch Rowland; Sammy Witte; Tyler Johnson	Tyler Johnson	Fine Line
2020	Alfie Templeman	"Forever Isn't Long Enough"	Alfie Templeman	Alfie Templeman; Jeremy Hatcher	Forever Isn't Long Enough
2020	Shawn Mendes	"Intro"	N/A	Shawn Mendes; Scott Harris (add.); Nate Mercereau (add.)	Wonder
2020	Shawn Mendes	"Wonder"	Shawn Mendes; Scott Harris; Nathaniel Mercereau	Shawn Mendes; Nate Mercereau; Scott Harris (add.)	Wonder
2020	Cam	"Changes"	Harry Styles; Lori McKenna; Tyler Johnson	N/A	The Otherside
2020	Shawn Mendes	"Higher"	N/A	Shawn Mendes; Nate Mercereau; Scott Harris (add.); Sly (add.)	Wonder
2020	Shawn Mendes	"24 Hours"	Shawn Mendes; Scott Harris; Nathaniel Mercereau	Shawn Mendes; Scott Harris; Nate Mercereau (add.)	Wonder
2020	Shawn Mendes	"Teach Me How to Love"	Shawn Mendes; Scott Harris; Nathaniel Mercereau	Shawn Mendes; Nate Mercereau; Scott Harris (add.)	Wonder
2020	Shawn Mendes	"Call My Friends"	Shawn Mendes; Scott Harris; John Ryan II; Nathaniel Mercereau	Shawn Mendes; John Ryan; Nate Mercereau (add.); Scott Harris (add.)	Wonder
2020	Shawn Mendes	"Dream"	Shawn Mendes; Scott Harris; Nathaniel Mercereau	Shawn Mendes; Nate Mercereau; Scott Harris (add.)	Wonder
2020	Shawn Mendes	"Song for No One"	N/A	Shawn Mendes; Frank Dukes; Nate Mercereau; Scott Harris (add.)	Wonder
2020	Shawn Mendes	"305"	Shawn Mendes; Scott Harris; Nathaniel Mercereau	Nate Mercereau; Scott Harris (add.)	Wonder
2020	Shawn Mendes	"Always Been You"	N/A	Shawn Mendes; Nate Mercereau; Scott Harris (add.)	Wonder
2020	Shawn Mendes	"Piece of You"	N/A	Shawn Mendes; Ricky Reed; Nate Mercereau (add.); Scott Harris (add.)	Wonder
2020	Shawn Mendes	"Look Up at the Stars"	Shawn Mendes; Scott Harris	Shawn Mendes; Nate Mercereau (add.); Scott Harris (add.)	Wonder
2020	Shawn Mendes	"Can't Imagine"	N/A	Shawn Mendes; Nate Mercereau (add.); Scott Harris (add.)	Wonder
2021	WORRYWORRY	"Outside"	Jessica Ware; WORRYWORRY; Jay Mooncie	Kurisu; WORRYWORRY	Miserable
2021	Celeste	"Tonight Tonight"	N/A	Josh Crocker; Charlie Hugall	Not Your Muse
2022	Harry Styles	"Music for a Sushi Restaurant"	Harry Styles; Tyler Johnson; Mitch Rowland	Tyler Johnson	Harry's House
2022	Harry Styles	"Late Night Talking"	Harry Styles	Tyler Johnson	Harry's House
2022	Harry Styles	"Grapejuice"	Harry Styles; Tyler Johnson	Tyler Johnson	Harry's House
2022	Harry Styles	"As It Was"	Harry Styles; Tyler Johnson	Tyler Johnson	Harry's House
2022	Harry Styles	"Daylight"	Harry Styles; Tyler Johnson	Tyler Johnson	Harry's House
2022	Harry Styles	"Little Freak"	Harry Styles	Tyler Johnson	Harry's House
2022	Harry Styles	"Matilda"	Harry Styles; Tyler Johnson; Amy Allen	Tyler Johnson	Harry's House
2022	Harry Styles	"Daydreaming"	Harry Styles; Tyler Johnson; Alex Weir; Louis Johnson; Quincy Jones; Tom Bahler; Valerie Johnson	Tyler Johnson	Harry's House
2022	Harry Styles	"Keep Driving"	Harry Styles; Tyler Johnson; Mitch Rowland	Tyler Johnson	Harry's House
2022	Harry Styles	"Satellite"	Harry Styles; Tyler Johnson	Tyler Johnson	Harry's House
2022	Harry Styles	"Boyfriends"	Harry Styles; Tyler Johnson; Tobias Jesso Jr.	Tyler Johnson	Harry's House
2022	Harry Styles	"Love Of My Life"	Harry Styles; Tyler Johnson	Tyler Johnson	Harry's House
2022	Lizzo	"If You Love Me"	Amy Allen; Lizzo; Nate Mercereau	Nate Mercereau	Special
2022	Maggie Rogers	"Want Want"	Maggie Rogers; Samuel Holden Jaffe	Del Water Gap Maggie Rogers	Surrender
2022	Maggie Rogers	"Horses"	Maggie Rogers	Maggie Rogers	Surrender
2022	Maggie Rogers	"Overdrive"	Maggie Rogers	Maggie Rogers	Surrender
2022	Maggie Rogers	"Shatter"	Maggie Rogers	Maggie Rogers	Surrender
2022	Maggie Rogers	"Be Cool"	Maggie Rogers	Maggie Rogers	Surrender
2022	Maggie Rogers	"I’ve Got A Friend"	Maggie Rogers	Maggie Rogers	Surrender
2022	Maggie Rogers	"Honey"	Maggie Rogers	Maggie Rogers	Surrender
2022	Maggie Rogers	"Different Kind of World"	Maggie Rogers	Maggie Rogers	Surrender
2022	Maggie Rogers	"That's Where I Am"	Maggie Rogers	Maggie Rogers	Surrender
2022	Florence + the Machine	"Heaven Is Here"	Florence Welch	Dave Bayley Florence Welch; Jack Antonoff	Dance Fever
2022	Florence + the Machine	"Cassandra"	Florence Welch	N/A	Dance Fever
2023	Miley Cyrus	"Flowers"	Miley Cyrus Gregory Aldae Hein Michael Pollack	Tyler Johnson	Endless Summer Vacation
2023	Miley Cyrus	"Thousand Miles"	Miley Cyrus Tobias Jesso Jr. Bibi Bourelly	Tyler Johnson Mike WiLL Made-It	Endless Summer Vacation
2023	Miley Cyrus	"Rose Colored Lenses"	Miley Cyrus	Tyler Johnson	Endless Summer Vacation
2023	Miley Cyrus	"Wonder Woman"	Miley Cyrus Michael Pollack Gregory Aldae Hein	Tyler Johnson	Endless Summer Vacation
2023	Miley Cyrus	"River"	Miley Cyrus Justin Tranter	Tyler Johnson	Endless Summer Vacation
2023	Miley Cyrus	"Wildcard"	Miley Cyrus Tobias Jesso Jr.	Tyler Johnson	Endless Summer Vacation
2024	Kings of Leon	"Ballerina Radio"	Matthew Followill Jared Followill Nathan Followill Caleb Followill	N/A	Can We Please Have Fun
2024	Kings of Leon	"Rainbow Ball"	Matthew Followill Jared Followill Nathan Followill Caleb Followill	N/A	Can We Please Have Fun
2024	Kings of Leon	"Nowhere To Run"	Matthew Followill Jared Followill Nathan Followill Caleb Followill	N/A	Can We Please Have Fun
2024	Kings of Leon	"Mustang"	Matthew Followill Jared Followill Nathan Followill Caleb Followill	N/A	Can We Please Have Fun
2024	Kings of Leon	"Actual Daydream"	Matthew Followill Jared Followill Nathan Followill Caleb Followill	N/A	Can We Please Have Fun
2024	Kings of Leon	"Split Screen"	Matthew Followill Jared Followill Nathan Followill Caleb Followill	N/A	Can We Please Have Fun
2024	Kings of Leon	"Don't Stop the Bleeding"	Matthew Followill Jared Followill Nathan Followill Caleb Followill	N/A	Can We Please Have Fun
2024	Kings of Leon	"Nothing to Do"	Matthew Followill Jared Followill Nathan Followill Caleb Followill	N/A	Can We Please Have Fun
2024	Kings of Leon	"M Television"	Matthew Followill Jared Followill Nathan Followill Caleb Followill	N/A	Can We Please Have Fun
2024	Kings of Leon	"Hesitation Gen"	Matthew Followill Jared Followill Nathan Followill Caleb Followill	N/A	Can We Please Have Fun
2024	Kings of Leon	"Ease Me On"	Matthew Followill Jared Followill Nathan Followill Caleb Followill	N/A	Can We Please Have Fun
2024	Kings of Leon	"Seen"	Matthew Followill Jared Followill Nathan Followill Caleb Followill	N/A	Can We Please Have Fun
2024	Amy Shark	"Loving Me Lover"	Amy Shark	N/A	Sunday Sadness
2024	Girl In Red	"Doing It Again Baby"	Girl In Red	Matias Téllez	I'm Doing It Again Baby!
2024	Paris Hilton	"Stay Young"	Meghan Trainor Tyler Johnson	Jesse Shatkin Alex Frankel	Infinite Icon
2024	Carin León	"Ese Vato No Te Queda"	Carin León Gabito Ballesteros Édgar Barrera	N/A	Non-Album Single
2025	Jessie Reyez	"**I NEVER SAID I WAS SANE**"	Jessie Reyez	Fred Ball	PAID IN MEMORIES
2025	Jessie Reyez	"**BEEN ABOUTA YEAR**"	Jessie Reyez	OAK Keith Sorrells	PAID IN MEMORIES
2025	Miley Cyrus	"Give Me Love"	Miley Cyrus Tyler Johnson	Miley Cyrus Tyler Johnson Jonathan Rado Shawn Everett Michael Pollack	Something Beautiful
2025	Inhaler	"Eddie In The Darkness"	Elijah Hewson Josh Jenkinson Robert Keating Ryan McMahon	N/A	Open Wide
2025	Inhaler	"Billy (Yeah Yeah Yeah)"	Elijah Hewson Josh Jenkinson Robert Keating Ryan McMahon	N/A	Open Wide
2025	Inhaler	"Your House"	Elijah Hewson Josh Jenkinson Robert Keating Ryan McMahon	N/A	Open Wide
2025	Inhaler	"A Question of You"	Elijah Hewson Josh Jenkinson Robert Keating Ryan McMahon	N/A	Open Wide
2025	Inhaler	"Even Though"	Elijah Hewson Josh Jenkinson Robert Keating Ryan McMahon	N/A	Open Wide
2025	Inhaler	"Again"	Elijah Hewson Josh Jenkinson Robert Keating Ryan McMahon	N/A	Open Wide
2025	Inhaler	"Open Wide"	Elijah Hewson Josh Jenkinson Robert Keating Ryan McMahon Amy Allen	N/A	Open Wide
2025	Inhaler	"All I Got Is You"	Elijah Hewson Josh Jenkinson Robert Keating Ryan McMahon	N/A	Open Wide
2025	Inhaler	"Still Young"	Elijah Hewson Josh Jenkinson Robert Keating Ryan McMahon	N/A	Open Wide
2025	Inhaler	"The Charms"	Elijah Hewson Josh Jenkinson Robert Keating Ryan McMahon	N/A	Open Wide
2025	Inhaler	"X-Ray"	Elijah Hewson Josh Jenkinson Robert Keating Ryan McMahon	N/A	Open Wide
2025	Inhaler	"Concrete"	Elijah Hewson Josh Jenkinson Robert Keating Ryan McMahon	N/A	Open Wide
2025	Inhaler	"Little Things"	Elijah Hewson Josh Jenkinson Robert Keating Ryan McMahon	N/A	Open Wide
2025	Sophie Ellis-Bextor	"Stay On Me"	Caroline Ailin Julia Michaels Selena Gomez Sophie Ellis-Bextor	N/A	Perimenopop
2025	David Bryne & Ghost Train Orchestra	"Everybody Laughs"	David Bryne	N/A	Who Is The Sky?
2025	David Bryne & Ghost Train Orchestra	"When We Are Singing"	David Bryne	N/A	Who Is The Sky?
2025	David Bryne & Ghost Train Orchestra	"My Apartment Is My Friend"	David Bryne	N/A	Who Is The Sky?
2025	David Bryne & Ghost Train Orchestra	"A Door Called No"	David Bryne	N/A	Who Is The Sky?
2025	David Bryne & Ghost Train Orchestra	"What Is The Reason For It?"	David Bryne	N/A	Who Is The Sky?
2025	David Bryne & Ghost Train Orchestra	"I Met The Buddha at a Downtown Party"	David Bryne	N/A	Who Is The Sky?
2025	David Bryne & Ghost Train Orchestra	"Don't Be Like That"	David Bryne	N/A	Who Is The Sky?
2025	David Bryne & Ghost Train Orchestra	"The Avant Garde"	David Bryne	N/A	Who Is The Sky?
2025	David Bryne & Ghost Train Orchestra	"Moisturizing Thing"	David Bryne	N/A	Who Is The Sky?
2025	David Bryne & Ghost Train Orchestra	"I'm an Outsider"	David Bryne	N/A	Who Is The Sky?
2025	David Bryne & Ghost Train Orchestra	"She Explains Things To Me"	David Bryne	N/A	Who Is The Sky?
2025	David Bryne & Ghost Train Orchestra	"The Truth"	David Bryne	N/A	Who Is The Sky?
2025	David Bryne & Ghost Train Orchestra	"DefCon"	David Bryne	N/A	Who Is The Sky?
2026	Harry Styles	"Aperture"	Harry Styles	N/A	Kiss All The Time. Disco, Occasionally
2026	Harry Styles	"American Girls"	Harry Styles Tyler Johnson	Tyler Johnson	Kiss All The Time. Disco, Occasionally
2026	Harry Styles	"Ready, Steady, Go!"	Harry Styles Tyler Johnson	N/A	Kiss All The Time. Disco, Occasionally
2026	Harry Styles	"Are You Listening Yet?"	Harry Styles Tyler Johnson	Tyler Johnson	Kiss All The Time. Disco, Occasionally
2026	Harry Styles	"Taste Back"	Harry Styles Tyler Johnson	N/A	Kiss All The Time. Disco, Occasionally
2026	Harry Styles	"The Waiting Game"	Harry Styles Tyler Johnson	Tyler Johnson	Kiss All The Time. Disco, Occasionally
2026	Harry Styles	"Season 2 Weight Loss"	Harry Styles Tyler Johnson	N/A	Kiss All The Time. Disco, Occasionally
2026	Harry Styles	"Coming Up Roses"	Harry Styles		Kiss All The Time. Disco, Occasionally
2026	Harry Styles	"Pop"	Harry Styles Tyler Johnson	Tyler Johnson	Kiss All The Time. Disco, Occasionally
2026	Harry Styles	"Dance No More"	Harry Styles	N/A	Kiss All The Time. Disco, Occasionally
2026	Harry Styles	"Paint By Numbers"	Harry Styles Tyler Johnson	Tyler Johnson	Kiss All The Time. Disco, Occasionally
2026	Harry Styles	"Carla's Song"	Harry Styles	N/A	Kiss All The Time. Disco, Occasionally
2026	Lainey Wilson & John Mayer	"Phone, Keys, Wallet"	Lainey Wilson Jon Decious Den Pellarin Dallas Wilson Trannie Anderson Summer Overstreet	John Mayer	N/A

== Awards and nominations ==
=== Brit Awards ===
Year	Recipient(s) and nominee(s)	Category	Result	Ref.
2023	Himself	Songwriter of the Year	Won	

=== Grammy Awards ===
Year	Recipient(s) and nominee(s)	Category	Result	Ref.
2016	"What Kind of Man"	Best Rock Song	Nominated	
2023	Special	Album of the Year	Nominated	
2023	Harry's House	Album of the Year	Won	
2023	Harry's House	Best Pop Vocal Album	Won	
2023	"As It Was"	Record of the Year	Nominated	
2023	"As It Was"	Song of the Year	Nominated	
2024	Endless Summer Vacation	Album of the Year	Nominated	
2024	"Flowers"	Record of the Year	Won	

== See also ==
- List of British Grammy winners and nominees
