= E. Pellicci =

Historic café in the East End of London

Coordinates: 51.5265°N 0.0634°W

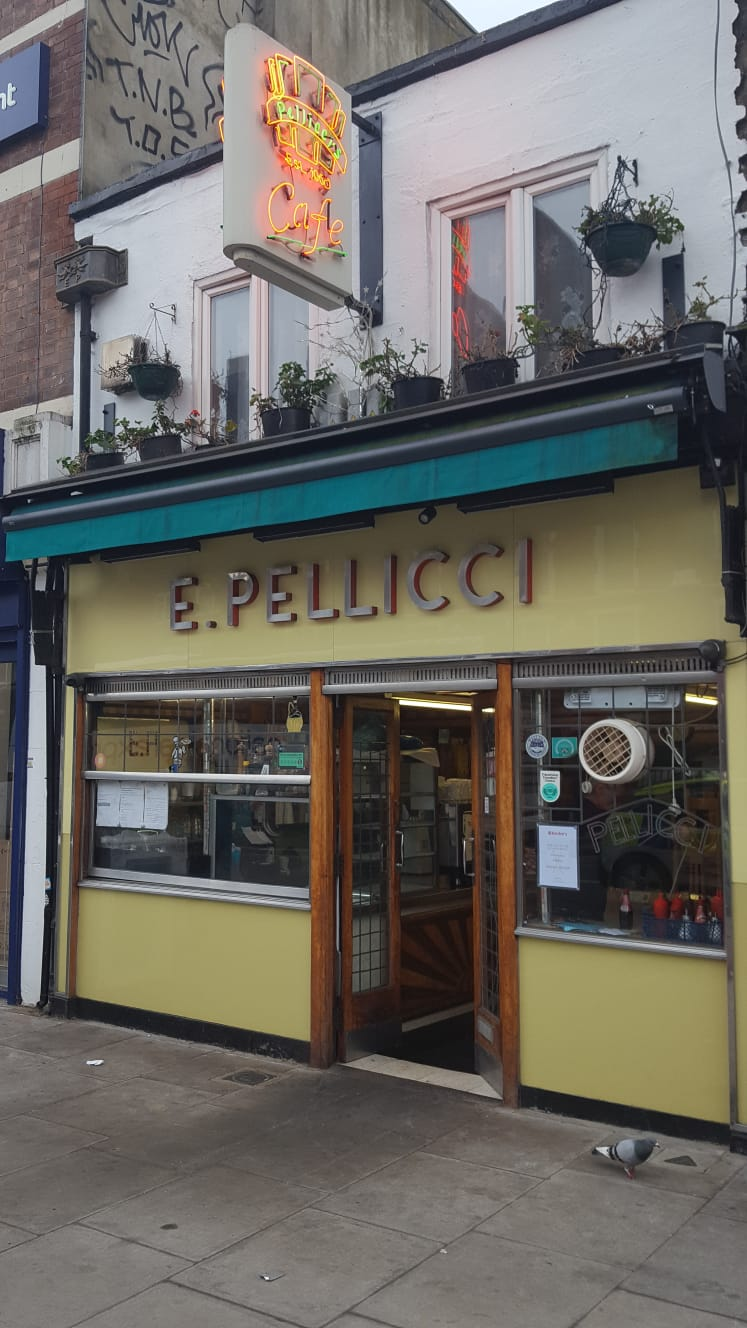
Exterior of the café in 2023

E. Pellicci, often known as Pellicci's, is a British-Italian café and restaurant in Bethnal Green in the East End of London. It is considered a representation of the local culture and history of the East End, particularly of a type of establishment common in interwar London, and continues to be seen as an important community space.

== History ==
E. Pellicci was established in 1900 by Tuscan immigrants. It is named for Priamo Pellicci who worked there from 1900 and his wife Elide giving the E initial. The building as well as its Art Deco interior was Grade II listed in 2005.

It has been suggested that the building that hosts the restaurant was frequented by the Kray Twins in the 1960s.

In 2022, part of the music video to Harry Styles's song "Late Night Talking" was filmed there.

In 2024, E. Pellicci started the podcast Down the Caff which is recorded inside the restaurant.

In 2025, the restaurant's owner Maria Pellicci became a Knight of the Order of the Star of Italy, an award aimed at recognising those who promote friendly relations between Italy and other

The inside of E. Pellicci, Italian style caff in the east end. Featured in the film legend (2015)

countries.
