= Matilda (Harry Styles song) =

Song by Harry Styles

from the album Harry's House
- Released: 20 May 2022
- Recorded: 2020–2021
- Studio: Real World (Box, Wiltshire); Shangri-La (Malibu, California); Angelic (London); Henson (Hollywood, Los Angeles)
- Genre: Folk
- Length: 4:05
- Label: Erskine; Columbia
- Songwriters: Harry Styles; Thomas Hull; Tyler Johnson; Amy Allen
- Producers: Kid Harpoon; Tyler Johnson

"Matilda" is a song by English singer-songwriter Harry Styles, from his third studio album Harry's House (2022). The song was written by Styles, Thomas Hull, Tyler Johnson and Amy Allen, while production was handled by Kid Harpoon and Johnson.

== Background ==
Harry Styles announced the title of his third studio album as Harry's House on 23 March 2022, unveiling its artwork, a 40-second trailer and the album's release date as 20 May 2022.

In an interview with Zane Lowe after the album's release, Styles spoke about the title and why he wrote the song:

"I had an experience with someone where, in getting to know them better, they revealed some stuff to me that was very much like 'Oh, that's not normal, like I think you should maybe get some help or something.'This song was inspired by that experience and person, who I kind of disguised as Matilda from the Roald Dahl book. I played it to a couple of friends and all of them cried. So I was like, 'Okay, I think this is something to pay attention to.' It's a weird one, because with something like this, it's like, 'I want to give you something, I want to support you in some way, but it's not necessarily my place to make it about me because it's not my experience.' Sometimes it's just about listening. I hope that's what I did here. If nothing else, it just says, 'I was listening to you'".

== Critical reception ==
The song received positive reviews from critics, with particular praise being given to its lyrical content. Rob Sheffield of Rolling Stone described it as the "centerpiece of the album".

== Commercial performance ==
Following the release of its parent album Harry's House, "Matilda" entered at number nine on the Billboard Hot 100 dated 4 June 2022, becoming one of the four top-ten entries; the others being "As It Was", "Late Night Talking" and "Music for a Sushi Restaurant" which peaked at numbers one, three and eight, respectively.

== Charts ==
Weekly chart performance for "Matilda"
Chart (2022)	Peak position
Argentina Hot 100 (Billboard)	86
Australia (ARIA)	3
Austria (Ö3 Austria Top 40)	21
Canada Hot 100 (Billboard)	5
Denmark (Tracklisten)	24
France (SNEP)	103
Global 200 (Billboard)	6
Hungary (Stream Top 40)	31
Iceland (Tónlistinn)	10
Ireland (IRMA)	3
Italy (FIMI)	61
New Zealand (Recorded Music NZ)	3
Norway (VG-lista)	23
Portugal (AFP)	4
South Africa Streaming (TOSAC)	20
Spain (Promusicae)	80
Sweden (Sverigetopplistan)	25
Switzerland (Schweizer Hitparade)	23
UK Singles (Official Charts)	37
US Billboard Hot 100	9

== Certifications ==
Certifications for "Matilda"
Region	Certification	Certified units/sales
Australia (ARIA)	Platinum	70,000^{‡}
Brazil (Pro-Música Brasil)	Diamond	160,000^{‡}
Canada (Music Canada)	Platinum	80,000^{‡}
Denmark (IFPI Danmark)	Gold	45,000^{‡}
France (SNEP)	Gold	100,000^{‡}
Italy (FIMI)	Gold	50,000^{‡}
Mexico (AMPROFON)	Platinum	140,000^{‡}
New Zealand (RMNZ)	2× Platinum	60,000^{‡}
Poland (ZPAV)	Gold	25,000^{‡}
Portugal (AFP)	Gold	5,000^{‡}
Spain (Promusicae)	Gold	30,000^{‡}
United Kingdom (BPI)	Platinum	600,000^{‡}
United States (RIAA)	Platinum	1,000,000^{‡}
^{‡} Sales+streaming figures based on certification alone.
