= Let Me Back =

Single by Zarif

from the album Box of Secrets
- Released: 6 April 2009
- Recorded: 2008
- Length: 3:41
- Label: RCA / Sony BMG
- Songwriters: Zarif, Dan Radclyffe & Alan Spenner
- Producers: Utters, Tommy D

Zarif singles chronology
"Let Me Back" (2009)	"Box of Secrets" (2010)

"Let Me Back" is the debut single by UK singer-songwriter Zarif. It was released on 5 April 2009. It is the first single taken from her debut album Box of Secrets.

== Background ==
"Let Me Back" was written by Zarif and produced by Utters, with additional production by Tommy D who has worked with Kanye West and Corinne Bailey-Rae. It features a sample from the song "I´m Sorry Babe" by Kokomo.

Before the official release date, Zarif gave out free copies of "Let Me Back" on limited edition pink cassette at her gigs. There are official remixes of the song by Toddla T, Paul Jackson, Bobby & Klein, Love to Infinity, Afroganic and Sticky. There is also an acoustic version of the song which was released free, as a download, on Zarif's website.

"Let Me Back" was also announced as BBC Radio 2's Record of the Week for the week commencing 21 March 2009.

== Critical reception ==
- Attitude Magazine - "an upbeat slice of sunshine soul that contains glorious horns, a touch of doo wop and a lovely ode to Burt Bacharach at the end".
- Hit Sheet - "fabulously catchy".
- thelondonpaper - 'Single of the Week' (6 April 2009).

== Music video ==
The music video for "Let Me Back" was released in March 2009 and was directed by Rebel Alliance.

== Track listings ==
UK CD single

1. "Let Me Back" - 3:41
2. "Stop What You're Doing" (Acoustic Version)

UK Digital download

1. "Let Me Back" (Radio Edit) - 3:41
2. "Let Me Back" (Bobby & Klein Remix) - 5:15
3. "Let Me Back" (Love To Infinity Club Mix) - 6:44
4. "Let Me Back" (Paul Jackson Remix) - 6:29
5. "Let Me Back" (Toddla T Remix) - 4:37
6. "Let Me Back" (Sticky Remix) - 6:22
