= Harry's House =

2022 studio album by Harry Styles

Studio album by Harry Styles
- Released: 20 May 2022
- Recorded: 2020–2021
- Studios: Real World (Box); Shangri-La (Malibu); Angelic (London); Henson (Hollywood)
- Genres: Synth-pop; new wave; pop rock; pop-funk
- Length: 41:48
- Labels: Erskine; Columbia
- Producers: Kid Harpoon; Tyler Johnson; Samuel Witte

Harry Styles chronology
Fine Line (2019)	Harry's House (2022)	Kiss All the Time. Disco, Occasionally (2026)

Singles from Harry's House
- 1. "As It Was" Released: 1 April 2022; 2. "Late Night Talking" Released: 21 June 2022; 3. "Music for a Sushi Restaurant" Released: 3 October 2022; 4. "Satellite" Released: 3 May 2023

Harry's House is the third studio album by the English singer and songwriter Harry Styles, released on 20 May 2022 by Erskine and Columbia Records. The album was largely written and recorded during 2020 and 2021 and has been noted as Styles' most introspective work. Inspired by 1970s Japanese city pop, Harry's House is a synth-pop, new wave, pop rock and pop-funk album.

The album debuted with the best first-week sales in Styles' career. It debuted at number one on the UK Albums Chart with 113,000 album-equivalent units, becoming the fastest-selling and best-selling album of 2022 in the country. It also debuted at number one on the US Billboard 200 with 521,500 album-equivalent units, including 330,000 album sales. It debuted at number one in various other countries, including Australia, Belgium, Canada, France, Germany, Ireland, Italy, the Netherlands, New Zealand, Spain, Sweden and Switzerland.

Harry's House was met with critical acclaim for its production. It was supported by the singles "As It Was", "Late Night Talking", "Music for a Sushi Restaurant", and "Satellite"; the first of which debuted atop the UK and US charts, becoming Styles' second solo number-one song in both countries. Besides the chart-topper "As It Was", three other songs were concurrently in the top 10 of the US Billboard Hot 100: "Late Night Talking", "Music for a Sushi Restaurant" and "Matilda", making Styles the first British solo artist to achieve this feat. The album was featured on numerous 2022 year-end rankings and nominated for several awards, and Rolling Stone included it in their 2023 revision of the 500 Greatest Albums of All Time. At the 65th Grammy Awards, the album won Album of the Year, Best Pop Vocal Album and Best Engineered Album, Non-Classical.

== Writing and recording ==
In an interview with Apple Music, Styles explained how he came up with the album title: "The album is named after Haruomi Hosono, he had an album in the '70s called Hosono's House [sic], and I spent that chunk in Japan; I heard that record and I was like 'I love that.[...] It'd be really fun to make a record called Harry's House'." The initial idea behind the album came when Styles wanted to take the title in a literal way so he could make an acoustic extended play recorded at his own house. The album is considered Styles's most introspective of his career thus far; according to Styles the central concept of 'house' is a metaphor for the inside of his mind rather than a "geographical location". Speaking on the album's concept, Styles said "It was much more of an internal thing… [and] it felt like it took on this whole new meaning and it was about, like: imagine, it's a day in my house, what do I go through? A day in my mind, what do I go through? In my house I'm playing fun music, sad music, I'm playing this, I'm playing that. It's a day in the life." Styles was also inspired by a road trip he took through Italy in his deceased stepfather's car, where Styles listened to his old jazz CDs and "felt like [he] did a family thing" while on the drive. The album was largely written and recorded during 2020 and 2021.

Musically, Harry's House takes influence from Japan's 1970s-80s city pop genre, and primarily features synth-pop, new wave, pop rock and pop-funk styles, with elements of R&B.

=== Songs ===
"Boyfriends", however, was initially written during the final week of Fine Line (2019) recording. Speaking to Zane Lowe, Styles said of the track: "Boyfriends was written right at the end of Fine Line. I finished the album and we touched on it a last time, there was like an extra week to write some stuff. I recorded "Adore You", "Treat People With Kindness", and "Lights Up" […] and at the end of that session everyone left, and I started writing "Boyfriends" and it almost felt like "Ok, there's a version where we get this ready to put on [Fine Line]", and I think there was something about that just felt like "It's just gonna have its time, so like, let's not rush to get it done." And we did so many versions of it." Musician Ben Harper is credited playing the guitar on the track and had to ask for the guitar he gifted his daughter back to borrow to play it on the song. "Boyfriends" lyrically discusses the experience of romantic relationships in which "people don't treat each other very nicely sometimes" that Styles observed in his sister and friends when dating other people as well as his own experiences with dating.

"Little Freak" was also initially written in 2019 during Styles' trip to Tokyo. Producer Kid Harpoon in an interview with Rolling Stone stated the track was "actually produced and mixed in a whole different version for Fine Line, but it just didn't feel right." The track was written and made in a hotel room in Tokyo on "bad rental gear" according to Styles and went through many iterations before reaching the final product. In the album's liner notes, the song is partially credited as being recorded in 'Tom's Room', referring to Kid Harpoon.

The first song to be written for the album sessions was "Late Night Talking", which was written the day Styles, the band and the producers arrived at Shangri-La studios in Malibu. "Music For A Sushi Restaurant" was written early in the album process and originally considered to be the album title. Speaking to NPR, Styles said "I was in a sushi restaurant in Los Angeles with my producer and one of our songs came on from the last album, and I kind of said like, this is really strange music for a sushi restaurant. And then I was like, oh, that would be a really fun album title. And then as this as this - as the songs started being made, I kind of just said "Music For A Sushi Restaurant."

"Matilda" is titled after the lead character from a book of the same name, written by Roald Dahl. The song was inspired by a relationship Styles had with someone who was going through difficulty. In an interview with Zane Lowe, Styles stated he wrote the song to show he was listening: "Sometimes it's just about listening. I hope that's what I did here. If nothing else, it just says, 'I was listening to you'". "Daylight" was written as an all-nighter project as Styles was worried the track would not be finished otherwise. Styles stated the song was about "an infatuation of chasing troubled things.”

"Cinema" was Styles's "fun" track which he started writing while being on a treadmill. The album features John Mayer on lead guitar on both "Cinema" and "Daydreaming". Of "Daydreaming", Styles' collaborator Tyler Johnson first sent Styles a voice note while he was driving from Palm Springs to LA called 'idea on the 101 rough' that kickstarted the track. Mayer was working in the studio across the corridor from Styles and Styles asked him to listen to the song for a breakdown section, he grabbed one of Mitch Rowland's guitars and played to the track.

"Love of My Life" is Styles's way of showing his love and appreciation to England and home. Styles stated he wrote the song at Sony Music Entertainment CEO Rob Stringer's house and features Stringer's ringtone in the background at his One Night Only concert for Apple Music: Live.

== Release and promotion ==
The album was released on 20 May 2022 through Erskine and Columbia. Styles announced the title of his upcoming third studio album as Harry's House on 23 March 2022, unveiling its artwork, a 40-second trailer and the album's release date of 20 May 2022.

=== Marketing and performances ===
In a trailer, Styles steps on the podium of a theatre and grins while a "house façade" rises near him and reversed synthesisers play in the background; the audio would later be revealed to be a backwards version of the album's closing track, "Love of My Life". Joni Mitchell, whose 1975 album The Hissing of Summer Lawns featured a track called "Harry's House / Centerpiece", tweeted that she "love[d] the title". Upon announcing the album, Styles set up an interactive website and a new Twitter account. The messages published included "you are home" and "in this world, it's just us, you know it's not the same as it was".

On 15 April 2022, during his Coachella headlining performance, Styles performed "As It Was" live for the first time, in addition to two then-unreleased songs from the album, "Boyfriends" and "Late Night Talking". One month before the album's release, Harry's House was reportedly leaked on Twitter in its entirety. Sony, owner of Columbia Records, publicly condemned the leak in a since deleted tweet. On 26 May 2022, in a segment on The Late Late Show with James Corden, Styles and James Corden filmed a music video for the song "Daylight" directed by the latter, in which they visit an apartment belonging to some fans. Both the music video and segment were released on the show's YouTube channel on 28 May 2022.

=== Singles ===
"As It Was" was released as the lead single of Harry's House on 1 April 2022, having been previously announced on 28 March 2022. "As It Was" debuted atop the UK and US charts, becoming his second solo number one single in both countries, and reached the top of Australian and Canadian charts.

"Late Night Talking" was released to US pop radio on 21 June 2022, as the album's second single. It reached the top five on American, Australian, British and Canadian charts.

"Music for a Sushi Restaurant" was released to adult contemporary radio on 3 October 2022, as the album's third single. It peaked in the top ten on American, Australian, British and Canadian charts prior to its release as a single.

"Satellite" was released as the album's fourth single on 3 May 2023.

== Critical reception ==
Professional ratings
Aggregate scores
Source	Rating
AnyDecentMusic?	7.7/10
Metacritic	83/100
Review scores
Source	Rating
AllMusic	4.5/5 stars
And It Don't Stop	A
DIY	4/5 stars
Entertainment Weekly	A−
The Guardian	4/5 stars
The Independent	4/5 stars
The Line of Best Fit	7/10
NME	4/5 stars
Pitchfork	7.2/10
Rolling Stone	4/5 stars

Harry's House was met with critical acclaim. At Metacritic, which assigns a normalised rating out of 100 to reviews from professional publications, the album received an average score of 83 based on 26 reviews, indicating "universal acclaim"—Styles' highest rated album.

Veteran critic Robert Christgau applauded the album's musical fluidity while stating, "Even more remarkable is the way the lyrics this soundscape cushion and accentuate achieve a metaphorical reach and narrative concreteness truly rare in megapop." Alexis Petridis of The Guardian wrote that the album "ticks a lot of the right boxes and has abundant charm, which makes it a perfect reflection of the pop star who made it". Reviewing the album for DIY, Emma Swann felt that while Styles alternately spends time "exploring vivid lyrical micro-vignettes" and then "obfuscating" the narrative on the album, he is "also not scared of being secondary to the song; a lesson it's taken many others far longer to learn". Neil Z. Yeung from AllMusic stated that "Harry's House is what happens when Styles steps out of the spotlight to live his life. And despite the fact that there's nothing as immortal as 'Watermelon Sugar' to be found, this album, as a whole, has solid bones and is sturdy enough to last."

=== Year-end lists ===
Numerous critics and publications listed Harry's House in their year-end ranking of the best albums of 2022, often inside the top-ten.

Select year-end rankings of Harry's House
Publication	List	Rank	Ref.
Albumism	The 100 Best Albums of 2022	5	
And It Don't Stop	Dean's List: 2022	12	
Billboard	The 50 Best Albums of 2022: Staff List	6	
Consequence of Sound	Top 50 Albums of 2022	19	
NME	The 50 best albums of 2022	16	
People	PEOPLE Picks the Top 10 Albums of the Year	7	
Rolling Stone	The 100 Best Albums of 2022	5	
The Guardian	The 50 best albums of 2022	12	
The Telegraph	The best albums of 2022 – and the worst	5	
The Times	Ranked: 25 best albums of 2022	9	
USA Today	USA Today's 10 Best Albums of 2022	1	

=== All-time lists ===
In 2023, Harry's House was included in Rolling Stone's "The 500 Greatest Albums of All Time" list.

All-time lists for Harry's House
Publication	List	Rank	Ref.
Rolling Stone	The 500 Greatest Albums of All Time	491	

=== Recognition ===
Harry's House received extensive praise from musicians. Neil Tennant of the Pet Shop Boys praised the album for its daring nature, stating "You're very aware that he wants to be a bit weird, even though he's a mainstream pop star. [...] It's great for that, because when pop is trying, I always think it's at its best." Billie Eilish stated Styles influenced her to perform unreleased material after his Coachella performance and that the track Boyfriends was beautiful and vulnerable. Lizzo, Ed Sheeran, and Boy George also all supported the album and Styles upon release.

The album also received praise from those within the entertainment industry. Author Rick Riordan hailed the album as "even better than Fine Line. "Music for a Sushi Restaurant" reminds of Paul Simon on Graceland [...] "As it Was" is infectiously listenable, and "Little Freak" is just beautifully sad."

== Commercial performance ==
=== Global ===
Two hours after the album was released on Apple Music, Harry's House earned the most first-day streams for a pop album released in 2022. The album ranked as the second most streamed album on Spotify in 2022. It was the 10th most streamed album on Spotify in 2023. With the entire tracklist charting within the top 15 of the ARIA Charts, the album set a new record in Australia.

=== United Kingdom ===
In the United Kingdom, the album debuted at number one on the UK Albums chart with 113,000 album-equivalent units, becoming Styles' second number-one album and the fastest-selling album of 2022. Based on the first five weeks' exclusive data from the OCC, Harry's House outperformed Fine Line in the UK by almost 200% in terms of streaming consumption at the same stage of release. The album was highlighted as helping to bring a £4 billion boost to UK music export revenue and the highest level of vinyl sales since 1990. The album and Styles' success was also credited with bringing record streaming success for UK acts at home and abroad.

=== North America ===
In the United States, Harry's House debuted at number one on the Billboard 200 chart with 521,500 units, consisting of 330,000 pure sales and 189,000 streaming units (from the 246.96 million on-demand streams of the album's tracks). It became Styles' third US number-one album, his biggest debut in the country, and the second-largest opening week for an album in 2022, behind Taylor Swift's Midnights. (Note: Midnights, the tenth studio album by American singer-songwriter Taylor Swift, surpassed the first-week tally of Harry's House and garnered the biggest sales week of 2022 in the US.) Additionally, it set a modern-era record for single-week vinyl album sales in the US, selling 182,000 copies, and marked the second-largest week for an album on vinyl since Luminate began tracking music sales in 1991. Harry's House notched a second consecutive week at number one, with 160,500 units sold, becoming his second album to spend multiple weeks atop the charts after 2019's Fine Line and the first album to spend its first two weeks at number one since Adele's 30 spent its first six weeks at number one from late 2021 through to early 2022.

Besides the chart-topper "As It Was", three other songs reached the top 10 of the US Billboard Hot 100: "Late Night Talking" (at number four), "Music for a Sushi Restaurant" (at number eight) and "Matilda" (at number nine). With four concurrent top-ten hits on the chart, this made Styles the first British solo artist to achieve this, and among all British acts he joins the Beatles, who achieved the feat in 1964.

== Accolades ==
Harry's House has garnered many awards and nominations, including Album of the Year at the 65th Annual Grammy Awards and British Album of the Year at the Brit Awards 2023.

Awards and nominations for Harry's House
Organization	Year	Category	Result	Ref.
American Music Awards	2022	Favorite Pop Album	Nominated	
ARIA Music Awards	2022	Best International Artist	Won	
Capricho Awards	2022	Album of the Year	Nominated	
Danish Music Awards	2022	International Album of the Year	Nominated	
LOS40 Music Awards	2022	Best International Album	Won	
Mercury Prize	2022	Albums of the Year	Nominated	
MTV Video Music Awards	2022	Album of the Year	Won	
People's Choice Awards	2022	The Album of 2022	Nominated	
Brit Awards	2023	British Album of the Year	Won	
CD Shop Awards	2023	Western Music Award	Won	
Fonogram Awards	2023	Foreign Pop/Rock Album or Recording of the Year	Nominated	
Gaffa Awards	2023	International Album Of The Year	Won	
Grammy Awards	2023	Album of the Year	Won	
Grammy Awards	2023	Best Pop Vocal Album	Won	
Grammy Awards	2023	Best Engineered Album, Non-Classical	Won	
Juno Awards	2023	International Album of the Year	Won	
Music Producers Guild Awards	2023	UK Album of the Year	Won	
Nickelodeon Kids' Choice Awards	2023	Favorite Album	Nominated	
Premios Odeón	2023	Best International Album	Won	
SEC Awards	2023	International Album/EP of the Year	Nominated	
Swiss Music Awards	2023	Best Solo Act International	Won	
Žebřík Music Awards	2023	Best International Album	Won	

== Track listing ==
Harry's House track listing
No.	Title	Writer(s)	Producer(s)	Length
1.	"Music for a Sushi Restaurant"	Harry Styles; Thomas Hull; Tyler Johnson; Mitch Rowland	Kid Harpoon; Johnson	3:14
2.	"Late Night Talking"	Styles; Hull	Kid Harpoon; Johnson	2:58
3.	"Grapejuice"	Styles; Hull; Johnson	Kid Harpoon; Johnson	3:12
4.	"As It Was"	Styles; Hull; Johnson	Kid Harpoon; Johnson	2:47
5.	"Daylight"	Styles; Hull; Johnson	Kid Harpoon; Johnson	2:45
6.	"Little Freak"	Styles; Hull	Kid Harpoon; Johnson	3:23
7.	"Matilda"	Styles; Hull; Johnson; Amy Allen	Kid Harpoon; Johnson	4:05
8.	"Cinema"	Styles; Samuel Witte	Kid Harpoon; Johnson; Witte	4:03
9.	"Daydreaming"	Styles; Hull; Johnson	Kid Harpoon; Johnson	3:07
10.	"Keep Driving"	Styles; Hull; Johnson; Rowland	Kid Harpoon; Johnson	2:19
11.	"Satellite"	Styles; Hull; Johnson	Kid Harpoon; Johnson	3:37
12.	"Boyfriends"	Styles; Hull; Johnson; Tobias Jesso Jr.	Kid Harpoon; Johnson	3:12
13.	"Love of My Life"	Styles; Hull; Johnson	Kid Harpoon; Johnson	3:11
Total length:				41:48

=== Note ===
- "Daydreaming" contains a sample from "Ain't We Funkin' Now" as performed by the Brothers Johnson, written by Quincy Jones, Louis Johnson, Alex Weir, Tom Bahler and Valerie Johnson.

== Personnel ==
=== Musicians ===
- Harry Styles – lead vocals (all tracks), whistles (3), glockenspiel (10), keyboards (11), tubular bells (4)
- Alayna Rodgers – background vocals (1, 2, 8, 9)
- India Boodram – background vocals (1, 2, 8, 9)
- Mitch Rowland – bass guitar, percussion (1); drums (4, 10), electric guitar (10)
- Kid Harpoon – drum machine (1, 2, 4–6, 10, 13), electric guitar (1–6, 8–11, 13), synthesizer (1, 2, 4–6, 8–11, 13), bass guitar (2–11, 13); programming, tambourine (2); drums (3, 4, 8, 9, 11), keyboards (3, 8, 10), piano (3, 7), acoustic guitar (6, 7, 13), percussion (8)
- Tyler Johnson – drum machine (1, 3–6, 8, 10, 13), electric guitar (1, 5, 6), synthesizer (1, 4–11, 13), background vocals (2, 5, 9), programming (2, 3, 13), horn (3), keyboards (3, 9–11), piano (4, 9, 13), bass guitar (8, 10, 11), organ (9, 11)
- Ivan Jackson – trumpet (1)
- Rob Harris – bass guitar, electric guitar (3)
- Hal Ritson – programming (3)
- Jeremy Hatcher – programming (3–5, 8, 11, 13), electric guitar (11)
- Richard Adlam – programming (3)
- Doug Showalter – electric guitar, percussion (4)
- Pino Palladino – bass guitar (6, 9)
- Dev Hynes – cello (7)
- Joshua Johnson – saxophone (7)
- John Mayer – electric guitar (8, 9)
- Sammy Witte – programming, synthesizer (8)
- Cole Kamen-Green – horn (9)
- Ivan Jackson – horn (9)
- Sarah Jones – percussion (10)
- Ben Harper – acoustic guitar, electric guitar, slide guitar (12)

=== Technical ===
- Kid Harpoon – production (all tracks)
- Tyler Johnson – production (all tracks)
- Samuel Witte – production (8), engineering (6, 8)
- Randy Merrill – mastering
- Spike Stent – mixing
- Jeremy Hatcher – engineering (all tracks), mixing (6)
- Oli Jacobs – engineering (1, 6, 10)
- Hal Ritson – engineering (3)
- Richard Adlam – engineering (3)
- Nick Lobel – engineering (11), vocal engineering (10)
- Joe Dougherty – engineering assistance
- Josh Caulder – engineering assistance
- Matt Wolach – engineering assistance
- Adele Phillips – engineering assistance (1–11, 13)
- Luke Gibbs – engineering assistance (1–11, 13)
- Katie May – engineering assistance (1, 3, 4, 6, 8, 10, 13)
- Oli Middleton – engineering assistance (1, 6, 10)
- Garry Purohit – engineering assistance (2, 3, 5–7, 9)
- Matt Tuggle – engineering assistance (6)
- Brian Rajartnam – engineering assistance (8)

=== Art ===
- Molly Hawkins – creative director
- Hanna Moon – photography
- Harry Lambert – styling
- Patience Harding – set decoration
- Bradley Pinkerton – graphic design

== Charts ==
=== Weekly charts ===
Weekly chart performance for Harry's House
Chart (2022)	Peak position
Argentine Albums (CAPIF)	1
Australian Albums (ARIA)	1
Austrian Albums (Ö3 Austria)	1
Belgian Albums (Ultratop Flanders)	1
Belgian Albums (Ultratop Wallonia)	1
Canadian Albums (Billboard)	1
Croatian International Albums (HDU)	1
Czech Albums (ČNS IFPI)	1
Danish Albums (Hitlisten)	1
Dutch Albums (Album Top 100)	1
Finnish Albums (Suomen virallinen lista)	1
French Albums (SNEP)	1
German Albums (Offizielle Top 100)	1
Greek Albums (IFPI)	1
Hungarian Albums (MAHASZ)	1
Icelandic Albums (Tónlistinn)	1
Irish Albums (IRMA)	1
Italian Albums (FIMI)	1
Japanese Albums (Oricon)	35
Japanese Hot Albums (Billboard Japan)	43
Lithuanian Albums (AGATA)	1
New Zealand Albums (RMNZ)	1
Norwegian Albums (VG-lista)	1
Polish Albums (ZPAV)	1
Portuguese Albums (AFP)	1
Scottish Albums (Official Charts)	1
Spanish Albums (Promusicae)	1
Swedish Albums (Sverigetopplistan)	1
Swiss Albums (Schweizer Hitparade)	1
UK Albums (Official Charts)	1
Uruguayan Albums (CUD)	2
US Billboard 200	1

=== Year-end charts ===
2022 year-end chart performance for Harry's House
Chart (2022)	Position
Australian Albums (ARIA)	2
Austrian Albums (Ö3 Austria)	2
Belgian Albums (Ultratop Flanders)	3
Belgian Albums (Ultratop Wallonia)	13
Canadian Albums (Billboard)	6
Danish Albums (Hitlisten)	5
French Albums (SNEP)	20
Dutch Albums (Album Top 100)	1
German Albums (Offizielle Top 100)	5
Hungarian Albums (MAHASZ)	12
Icelandic Albums (Tónlistinn)	2
Italian Albums (FIMI)	13
Lithuanian Albums (AGATA)	2
New Zealand Albums (RMNZ)	1
Polish Albums (ZPAV)	10
Portuguese Albums (AFP)	1
Spanish Albums (PROMUSICAE)	4
Swedish Albums (Sverigetopplistan)	2
Swiss Albums (Schweizer Hitparade)	6
UK Albums (OCC)	1
US Billboard 200	7

2023 year-end chart performance for Harry's House
Chart (2023)	Position
Australian Albums (ARIA)	6
Austrian Albums (Ö3 Austria)	5
Belgian Albums (Ultratop Flanders)	5
Belgian Albums (Ultratop Wallonia)	34
Canadian Albums (Billboard)	12
Danish Albums (Hitlisten)	11
Dutch Albums (Album Top 100)	3
French Albums (SNEP)	42
German Albums (Offizielle Top 100)	23
Hungarian Albums (MAHASZ)	36
Icelandic Albums (Tónlistinn)	10
Italian Albums (FIMI)	39
New Zealand Albums (RMNZ)	4
Polish Albums (ZPAV)	36
Spanish Albums (PROMUSICAE)	17
Swedish Albums (Sverigetopplistan)	19
Swiss Albums (Schweizer Hitparade)	16
UK Albums (OCC)	5
US Billboard 200	15

2024 year-end chart performance of Harry's House
Chart (2024)	Position
Australian Albums (ARIA)	61
Belgian Albums (Ultratop Flanders)	38
Belgian Albums (Ultratop Wallonia)	177
Danish Albums (Hitlisten)	77
Dutch Albums (Album Top 100)	31
French Albums (SNEP)	145
German Albums (Offizielle Top 100)	89
Icelandic Albums (Tónlistinn)	61
UK Albums (OCC)	62

2025 year-end chart performance of Harry's House
Chart (2025)	Position
Belgian Albums (Ultratop Flanders)	95
Dutch Albums (Album Top 100)	83

== Certifications and sales ==
Certifications and sales for Harry's House
Region	Certification	Certified units/sales
Australia (ARIA)	2× Platinum	140,000^{‡}
Austria (IFPI Austria)	Gold	7,500^{‡}
Brazil (Pro-Música Brasil)	Diamond	160,000^{‡}
Canada (Music Canada)	Platinum	80,000^{‡}
Denmark (IFPI Danmark)	2× Platinum	40,000^{‡}
France (SNEP)	2× Platinum	200,000^{‡}
Germany (BVMI)	Gold	100,000^{‡}
Hungary (MAHASZ)	4× Platinum	16,000^{‡}
Iceland (FHF)	Gold	2,500
Italy (FIMI)	2× Platinum	100,000^{‡}
New Zealand (RMNZ)	5× Platinum	75,000^{‡}
Poland (ZPAV)	4× Platinum	80,000^{‡}
Portugal (AFP)	Platinum	7,000^{‡}
Spain (Promusicae)	2× Platinum	80,000^{‡}
Sweden (GLF)	Platinum	30,000^{‡}
United Kingdom (BPI)	3× Platinum	900,000^{‡}
United States (RIAA)	2× Platinum	2,300,000
^{‡} Sales+streaming figures based on certification alone.

== Release history ==
Harry's House release history
Region	Date	Format	Label	Ref.
Various	20 May 2022	Cassette; CD; digital download; streaming; vinyl	Erskine; Columbia	
Japan	8 June 2022	CD	Sony Music Japan	

== See also ==
- List of Billboard 200 number-one albums of 2022
- List of number-one albums from the 2020s (Denmark)
- List of number-one albums from the 2020s (New Zealand)
- List of number-one albums in Norway
- List of number-one albums of 2022 (Australia)
- List of number-one albums of 2022 (Canada)
- List of number-one albums of 2022 (Finland)
- List of number-one albums of 2022 (Ireland)
- List of number-one albums of 2022 (Poland)
- List of number-one albums of 2022 (Portugal)
- List of number-one albums of 2022 (Spain)
- List of number-one albums of the 2020s (Czech Republic)
- List of number-one hits of 2022 (France)
- List of number-one hits of 2022 (Germany)
- List of number-one hits of 2022 (Italy)
- List of number-one singles and albums in Sweden
- List of UK Albums Chart number ones of the 2020s
- Scottish Singles and Albums Charts
