= Zarif (singer) =

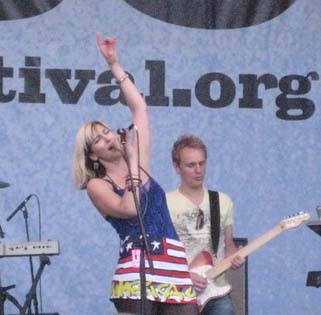
- Zarif performing at Rise Festival in 2008

Background information
- Also known as: Mona Lisa Veto
- Born: Zarif Davidson
- Origin: Harrow, England
- Genres: Funk; soul; pop
- Occupation: Singer-songwriter
- Instruments: Vocals; keyboards; guitar
- Years active: 2007–present
- Labels: Bright Pink; RCA; Sony BMG

Zarif Davidson, known professionally as Zarif or Mona Lisa Veto, is an English singer-songwriter and musician whose music incorporates soul, funk, and pop. She performs with a nine-piece band and sometimes plays keyboard and guitar.

== Early life ==
Zarif grew up in Harrow, London with her Scottish father and her Iranian mother. As a child, Zarif loved listening to music and some of her favourite artists are Michael Jackson, Stevie Wonder, Prince, and Aretha Franklin. She wrote her first song as an entry to a Blue Peter competition and formed a girl band with her friends called Girls of Tomorrow. Zarif was educated at North London Collegiate and went on to study at University College London, where she graduated with a human sciences degree.

== Music career ==
Zarif started her career performing in a series of venues in London in the city's soul singer-songwriter open mic circuit. The Nextmen saw her at one of these gigs and asked her to perform on three tracks on their album This Was Supposed to Be the Future as well as tour with them during mid 2007. At another of her open mic gigs, Zarif was spotted by a talent scout from Sony BMG. She was signed to RCA Records in 2007, performed with John Legend, and supported Taio Cruz and Chris Brown. She has performed live on BBC Radio 2, BBC London and GMTV.

In December 2008, Zarif's song "Box of Secrets" was featured in an advert for the TV channel Sky1 and released as a download. Her debut single, "Let Me Back", was released in April 2009. She supported Beyoncé on the UK leg of her I Am... World Tour during 2009, and the same year performed at festivals including Glastonbury, Wireless, and V Festival. Zarif was dropped by RCA Records and subsequently set up her own label called Bright Pink Records, with backing from a venture capital firm. She released her debut album, Box of Secrets, on this label in August 2010.

In December 2013, Zarif premiered new material online under the name Mona Lisa Veto.

== Musical style ==
Zarif has described her sound as "soulful and summery" and "upbeat and eclectic".

The Guardian named Zarif "the next big thing in British soul" and Billboard Magazine said she was like "Amy Winehouse with Madonna's pop flair." Also theguardian.co.uk described Zarif as a "chirpy, sassy cross between Lily Allen and Corinne Bailey Rae, or a lighter, frothier, poppier Amy Winehouse".

Touch Magazine said Zarif "exudes the kind of delicious, chocolaty tones and gut-wrenching melodies that Scott, Stone and even Wonder would applaud" and Hot Press said she has "a voice like a 21st century Diana Ross."

She is often compared to Amy Winehouse, however Zarif has said, "People are always going to try and find a comparison. I think our music's actually very different," to Digital Spy, "Obviously we're both kind of retro, but [my music is] a lot more upbeat and eclectic whereas [Amy Winehouses'] is more influenced by Motown. I can definitely see the similarities but I think at the same time that we do different things."

== Discography ==
=== Albums ===
- Box of Secrets (2010)

=== Singles ===
- "Let Me Back" (2009)
- "Box of Secrets" (2010)
- "Over" (2011)

=== Other recordings ===
==== As Zarif ====
- Zarif sang on three songs for The Nextmen's 2007 album, This Was Supposed to Be the Future. Zarif performs on the second single from the album, "Something Got You", as well as on the songs "Move" and "This Was Supposed to Be the Future".
- Drum and Bass artist Danny Byrd remixed Zarif's song "California" and the remix was released as a single in 2009. In 2010 Zarif recorded the vocals for the Danny Byrd track "Wait or Me" from his album Rave Digger.

==== As Mona Lisa Veto ====
- Giom - "Red Light"
- My Secretary - "Nothing Is Impossible" (produced by Giom)

=== Music videos ===
- "Something Got You" (July 2007, directed by Ricky Tart)
- "Let Me Back" (March 2009, directed by Rebel Alliance)
- "Over" (May 2009, directed by Kinga Burza)
- "Box of Secrets" featuring Ms. Bratt (June 2010, directed by Andy Hylton)
