= Can We Please Have Fun =

Studio album by Kings of Leon
- Released: May 10, 2024
- Studios: Dark Horse (Franklin, Tennessee); Henson (Hollywood, California)
- Genres: Indie rock; alternative rock; garage rock
- Length: 44:56
- Labels: LoveTap; Capitol
- Producer: Kid Harpoon

Kings of Leon chronology
When You See Yourself (2021)	Can We Please Have Fun (2024)	EP #2 (2025)

Singles from Can We Please Have Fun
- 1. "Mustang" Released: February 22, 2024; 2. "Split Screen" Released: March 29, 2024; 3. "Nothing to Do" Released: April 19, 2024; 4. "Nowhere to Run" Released: May 10, 2024; 5. "M Television" Released: November 1, 2024

Can We Please Have Fun is the ninth studio album by American rock band Kings of Leon. It was released on May 10, 2024, by LoveTap Records and Capitol Records, marking their first album to not be released on their original label, RCA Records. The album was produced by Kid Harpoon.

== Background and promotion ==
Can We Please Have Fun is Kings of Leon's first album with Capitol Records. The band recorded the album at the Dark Horse Recording studios in Franklin, Tennessee, with Kid Harpoon, who produced it. The album was announced on February 22, 2024, simultaneously with the release of the lead single "Mustang". This release was followed by "Split Screen" on March 29 and "Nothing To Do" on April 18.

The band supported the album with a headlining tour throughout Ireland, the UK, Europe and North America.

== Critical reception ==
Professional ratings
Aggregate scores
Source	Rating
AnyDecentMusic?	7.0/10
Metacritic	76/100
Review scores
Source	Rating
AllMusic	4/5 stars
Clash	7/10
Classic Rock	8/10
The Independent	4/5 stars
musicOMH	4/5 stars
NME	3/5 stars
The Observer	3/5 stars
Paste	7.8/10
Rolling Stone	4/5 stars
Spin	B−

Can We Please Have Fun received generally positive reviews from critics. At Metacritic, a website that assigns a normalized rating out of 100 to reviews from mainstream critics, the album received an average score of 76, based on 13 reviews, indicating generally favorable reviews.

== Track listing ==
All tracks are written by Caleb Followill, Jared Followill, Nathan Followill, and Matthew Followill.

Can We Please Have Fun track listing
No.	Title	Length
1.	"Ballerina Radio"	3:51
2.	"Rainbow Ball"	4:10
3.	"Nowhere to Run"	3:41
4.	"Mustang"	3:15
5.	"Actual Daydream"	3:19
6.	"Split Screen"	5:03
7.	"Don't Stop the Bleeding"	3:38
8.	"Nothing to Do"	2:55
9.	"M Television"	3:27
10.	"Hesitation Gen"	3:17
11.	"Ease Me On"	3:28
12.	"Seen"	4:52
Total length:		44:56

All tracks on Live in Wrexham recorded at the Racecourse Ground on May 27 and 28, 2023.

Live in Wrexham CD2 track listing
No.	Title	Length
1.	"Crawl"
2.	"King of the Rodeo"
3.	"Revelry"
4.	"On Call"
5.	"Find Me"
6.	"Pyro"
7.	"Cold Desert"

== Personnel ==
Credits are adapted from the album's liner notes.

=== Kings of Leon ===
- Caleb Followill – guitar, vocals
- Nathan Followill – drums, vocals, percussion
- Jared Followill – bass, vocals, additional guitar on "Don't Stop the Bleeding" and "Nothing to Do"
- Matthew Followill – guitar, vocals, additional synthesizers on "M Television" and "Seen", photographs

=== Additional contributors ===
- Kid Harpoon – production
- Brian Rajaratnam – engineering
- Emi Trevena – additional engineering
- Brent Rawlings – additional engineering on "Seen", additional assistance
- Liam O'Neil – piano, organ, synthesizers, additional engineering on "Seen"
- Drew Boals – engineering assistance
- Jacob Spitzer – engineering assistance
- Akarsh Vaidyanathan – engineering assistance
- Mark "Spike" Stent – mix engineering
- Matt Wolach – mixing assistance
- Tommy Turner – studio assistance
- Randy Merrill – mastering
- Chris "Nacho" Followill – additional assistance
- Nate Warshowsky – additional assistance
- Alaina Rocci – additional assistance
- Drew Scanlon – additional assistance
- Jessica Windsor – additional assistance
- Ron Reyes – design
- Casey McGrath – creative direction

== Charts ==
Chart performance for Can We Please Have Fun
Chart (2024)	Peak position
Australian Albums (ARIA)	20
Austrian Albums (Ö3 Austria)	5
Belgian Albums (Ultratop Flanders)	12
Belgian Albums (Ultratop Wallonia)	8
Canadian Albums (Billboard)	65
Croatian International Albums (HDU)	8
Dutch Albums (Album Top 100)	15
French Albums (SNEP)	85
German Albums (Offizielle Top 100)	4
Irish Albums (Official Charts)	2
Italian Albums (FIMI)	75
New Zealand Albums (RMNZ)	3
Polish Albums (ZPAV)	12
Portuguese Albums (AFP)	139
Scottish Albums (Official Charts)	1
Spanish Albums (Promusicae)	45
Swiss Albums (Schweizer Hitparade)	6
UK Albums (Official Charts)	2
UK Americana Albums (Official Charts)	1
US Billboard 200	35
US Top Rock & Alternative Albums (Billboard)	7
