= Amongst the Madness =

Studio album by The Nextmen
- Released: August 22, 2000
- Genre: Rap
- Length: 1:13:41
- Label: 75 Ark
- Producer: The Nextmen

The Nextmen chronology
Amongst the Madness (2000)	Get Over It (2003)

Professional ratings
Review scores
Source	Rating
AllMusic	4/5 stars
UrbanSmarts.com	3/5 stars

Amongst the Madness is the debut album by the British rap duo the Nextmen. It was released by 75 Ark in 2000. The track "Amongst the Madness" was featured on the Tony Hawk's Pro Skater 3 soundtrack.

== Track listing ==
1. "Amongst the Madness" - 3:57
2. "Break the Mould" - 4:43
3. "File Under Truth" - 3:44
4. "We Originate" - 2:41
5. "Step Below the Surface" - 4:00
6. "My Way" - 3:51
7. "Thinking Man's Session" - 4:58
8. "We Got" - 4:35
9. "Buck Foolish" - 4:27
10. "Clarity" - 6:11
11. "Shine On" - 4:46
12. "Sex, Lies, and Videotape" - 3:39
13. "Mental Alchemy" - 4:13
14. "Turn It Up a Little" - 3:23
15. "EBS" - 5:36
16. "Revitalise" - 5:00
17. "Simple and Plain" - 3:57 (CD only bonus track)
