= Dom Search =

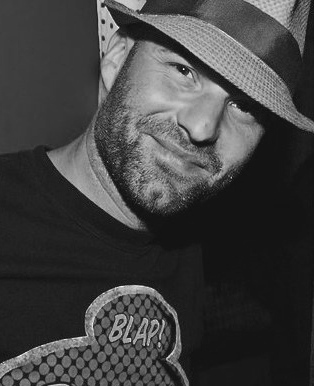
- Dom Search on tour with The Nextmen, Canada 2011

Background information
- Also known as: Dom Nextmen, Dom Betmead
- Born: Dominic Christian Betmead; Cambridge, England
- Genres: Hip hop, dance, pop
- Occupations: Producer, songwriter, DJ
- Instruments: Guitar, drums
- Member of: The Nextmen

Dom Search (born Dominic Christian Betmead in Cambridge, England), also known as Dom Nextmen, is a record producer, songwriter, guitarist and DJ based in London.

== Personal life ==
Born the youngest of two boys, he grew up in Cambridge, England with his mother and father, Gill and Jon Betmead and brother Saul. He is the grandson of Grimsby Town F.C. and England footballer Harry Betmead. Dominic's father is a folk singer songwriter who was most active in the seventies and introduced his sons to music from birth. He lives in North London with his girlfriend and two daughters.

== Musical career ==
Search has collaborated with and produced for Plan B, Groove Armada, Jimothy, Ms. Dynamite, Paolo Nutini, Marlon Roudette, Paul Epworth, Eliza Doolittle, Gorgon City, Ed Harcourt, Amy Wadge, Alexander O'Neal and Kiko Bun amongst others. He signed to Paul Epworth's Wolf Tone Publishing BMG imprint in 2012. He is one half of hip hop and electronic duo the Nextmen, a group he formed with fellow producer Bradford Ellis. The Nextmen have made four studio albums. They released the album Join the Dots in 2009 on Universal. The Nextmen singles "Round of Applause" and "Lion's Den" were both Zane Lowe's Hottest Records of the Week upon release.

Dom Search co-wrote and produced Plan B's "Who Needs Actions When You Got Words", the title track of the rapper's 2006 album, which is certified gold in the UK. He provided additional production on Paolo Nutini's One Day from the (UK) 2 x platinum 2014 album Caustic Love. The tracks "Better Than Me" and "Nice Things" from Marlon Roudette's 2014 album Electric Soul were produced and co-written by him. He collaborated with producer Cadenza and rapper Fem Fel on the 2015 track "Electric Blocks", and produced Louis Mttrs' track "God's Help" from the 2014 EP Beachy Head.

Nextmen remix credits include Public Enemy, Rae & Christian, Morcheeba and Groove Armada. Dom signed his first record deal with independent label Scenario Records after finishing university. His initial release, under the name Search was an EP titled Fracture. The first two Nextmen albums, Amongst the Madness and Get Over It were also released on Scenario. He contributed DJ work on two Groove Armada albums, Vertigo (BPI certified platinum UK; 1,000,000 sales worldwide) and Goodbye Country (BPI certified gold UK). The Nextmen track "Blood Fire" was included in the soundtrack to the video game FIFA Street 2.

Search's production is groove-based, falling within hip hop, pop and dance. His sound often fuses sparse, heavy hip hop drums with effected samples and electronic instrumentation. His riff-making guitar style is mixed, using elements of both rhythm and lead play. He learned recording techniques from Paul Epworth, whom he has worked with at various points in his career.

Since working with Plan B for a year in 2018, he has focused on house music production under an as-yet undisclosed moniker.

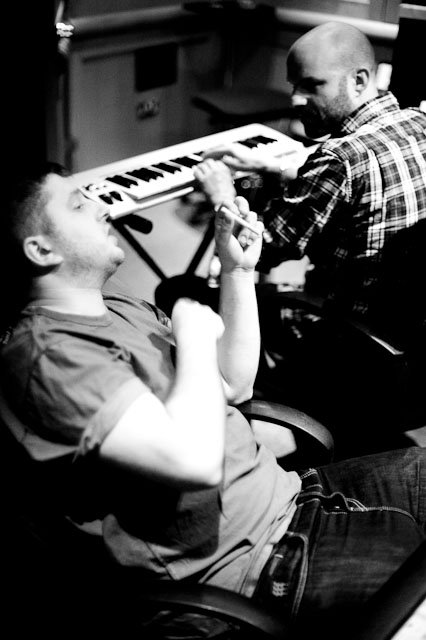
Dom Search working with Plan B in 2011

== DJ career ==
Dom started DJing at 15, delving into his father's record collection and taking inspiration from DJs such as DJ Jazzy Jeff and DJ Cash Money. As both a solo DJ and one half of the Nextmen, he has played eclectic club sets rooted in hip hop but encompassing dancehall, funk, house and garage, for over a decade. The Nextmen play regular sets in the UK and Europe, including for Jade Jagger in Ibiza, and have embarked on 12 tours of Australia and New Zealand. They have made many mixtapes, the most recent being 2016's Control the Night, an 80-minute potted history of drum & bass. The Nextmen provided the guest mix for Mistajam's BBC Radio 1Xtra show in 2011, and in 2016 provided a guest mix for BBC Radio 1's Friction show.

== Film and theatre ==
Dom worked as music producer alongside composer Bill Lyons on the Royal National Theatre's 2015 production of Everyman directed by Rufus Norris, starring Academy Award nominee Chiwetel Ejiofor and written by poet laureate Carol Ann Duffy. He worked closely with Norris, Lyons, sound designer Paul Arditti and choreographer Javier de Frutos, providing the contemporary urban soundtrack described by the London Evening Standard as "pulsating electronica". The Guardian described the play as a "stunning update".

He provided the soundtrack to Mark Street's 2014 short film Insoma.

== 2016–present ==
Search has since worked on new Nextmen material, a new Eliza Doolittle album, Kiko Bun's debut album, a new Marlon Roudette album, Mahalia's debut album and has contributed writing to Gorgon City's 2016 album Escape, co-writing the song "Love Me" featuring Lulu James which premiered on 18 November 2016 as Annie Mac's Hottest Record in the World. The Nextmen single "The Corner" featuring drum & bass producers Nu:Logic and Kiko Bun was released on the Nextmen's label Play Nice in November 2016, premiering on Mistajam's Radio 1 show. He continues to write and produce for both established and emerging acts, focusing on pop production and writing. Alongside Bradford Ellis and Dynamite MC, he created a new garage/house project based on a graphic novel he is writing entitled Echo Foxx. The first single "Rhyme Animal" was due for release on Strong Records in June 2016.

The Nextmen produced a collaborative album with Gentleman's Dub Club entitled Pound for Pound. Search provided production alongside Al Shux and Show N Prove on Plan B's single "Heartbeat", released 25 October 2017. Search co-produced and co-wrote Kiko Bun's single "Stay Bless" with producer Mike Spencer. He produced and co-wrote Eliza Doolittle's 2017 comeback single "Wide Eyed Fool" along with DJ/producer Tarl Jamieson a.k.a. Mo Fingaz. He worked in an executive producer role alongside producer Show N Prove on Plan B's album Heaven Before All Hell Breaks Loose.

Search worked on a jungle sequel to the Nextmen & Gentleman's Dub Club's 2018 album Pound for Pound, and an under-wraps dance music project.

== Discography ==
=== Album contributions ===
- A Real Romantic – Eliza Doolittle
- Escape – Gorgon City
- Heaven Before All Hell Breaks Loose – Plan B
- Caustic Love – Paolo Nutini
- Who Needs Actions When You Got Words – Plan B
- Vertigo – Groove Armada
- Goodbye Country (Hello Nightclub) – Groove Armada
- Electric Soul – Marlon Roudette
- Amongst the Madness – The Nextmen
- Get Over It – The Nextmen
- This Was Supposed to Be the Future – The Nextmen
- Join the Dots – The Nextmen
- Beachy Head – Louis Mttrs
- Pound for Pound – The Nextmen & Gentleman's Dub Club

=== Mixtapes (as The Nextmen) ===
- Control the Night
- Not the Nextmen
- A Child's Introduction to Jazz
- Personal Golf Instructions
- Blunted in the Backroom
- The Supermen Mix
- 6 Music Mix
- Yoga Mix
- Anxiety Mix
- Selector Radio Carnival Mix
- Checkmate
