= Music for a Sushi Restaurant =

Single by Harry Styles

from the album Harry's House
- Released: 3 October 2022
- Studio: Real World (Box, Wiltshire); Angelic (London); Henson (Hollywood, Los Angeles)
- Genre: Funk; pop
- Length: 3:14
- Label: Erskine; Columbia
- Songwriters: Harry Styles; Thomas Hull; Tyler Johnson; Mitch Rowland
- Producers: Kid Harpoon; Tyler Johnson

Harry Styles singles chronology
| "Late Night Talking" (2022) | "Music for a Sushi Restaurant" (2022) | "Satellite" (2023) |

Alternative cover
- CD single cover

Music video
- "Music for a Sushi Restaurant" on YouTube

"Music for a Sushi Restaurant" is a song by English singer-songwriter Harry Styles, from his third studio album, Harry's House (2022). It was released to hot adult contemporary radio on 3 October 2022, as the album's third single. The song was written by Styles, Thomas Hull, Tyler Johnson and Mitch Rowland, while production was handled by Kid Harpoon and Johnson. A music video for the song was later released on 27 October 2022.

== Background ==
Styles announced the title of his third studio album as Harry's House on 23 March 2022, unveiling its artwork, a 40-second trailer and the album's release date as 20 May 2022.

Styles spoke in an interview with Leila Fadel of NPR after the release of the album and revealed the story behind the track:

"I was in a sushi restaurant in Los Angeles with my producer and one of our songs came on from the last album," he said before revealing that he thought it was “really strange music for a sushi restaurant.

"And then I was like – that would be a really fun album title, but then as the song started being made I kind of just set on Music for a Sushi Restaurant," the star continued.

Music for a Sushi Restaurant definitely would have been a great album name, but Harry's House has a better ring to it.

"So the next time you're in a sushi restaurant and this is playing you’ll be like 'Harry’s House'," Leila joked, to which Harry said: "I'll be like – this is everything I've ever wanted."

== Promotion ==
The song was used as the soundtrack for an advertisement for Apple AirPods, which featured Styles scat singing along with pink, red and blue dancers in front of cycles of color — a nod to Apple's iconic "Silhouette" advertisements of the 2000s. Styles requested that Apple donate the artist fee for his appearance in the commercial to the International Rescue Committee (IRC).

== Music video ==
The music video for "Music for a Sushi Restaurant" was directed by Aube Perrie and released on 27 October 2022. The video was initially teased on 20 October 2022 through a commercial and website promoting the fictional "Gill's Lounge", the restaurant depicted in the music video.

The video features Styles as a human-squid hybrid that is washed ashore and found by several owners of a restaurant, who plan to cook him into sushi. Styles reveals his singing ability and takes control of the restaurant, making the owners his servants. The restaurant is turned into a lounge where Styles performs. While performing, Styles loses his voice, and the owners drag him away and turn him into sushi. The video ends with the lounge turning into a sushi restaurant.

== Accolades ==
Awards and nominations for "Music for a Sushi Restaurant"
| Organization | Year | Category | Result | Ref. |
|---|---|---|---|---|
| MTV Video Music Awards | 2023 | Best Visual Effects | Nominated | |
| MVF Awards | 2023 | International Music Video | Won | |

== Commercial performance ==
Following the release of its parent album Harry's House, "Music for a Sushi Restaurant" entered at number 8 on the Billboard Hot 100 dated June 4, 2022, becoming one of the four top-ten entries; the others being "As It Was", "Late Night Talking" and "Matilda" which peaked at numbers one, three and nine, respectively.

Prior to being released as a single, "Music for a Sushi Restaurant" began to chart on the Mainstream Top 40 at number 40 on the issue dated July 23, 2022, and later peaked at number 9.

== Credits and personnel ==
Credits are adapted from Tidal.

- Harry Styles – vocals, songwriting, associated performer
- Kid Harpoon – songwriting, production, drum machine, electric guitar, synthesiser
- Tyler Johnson – songwriting, production, drum machine, synthesiser
- Mitch Rowland – songwriting, bass, guitar, drums, electric guitar, synthesiser, percussion
- Jeremy Hatcher – recording
- Oli Jacobs – recording
- Randy Merrill – mastering
- Spike Stent – mixing
- Doug Showalter - associated performer
- Luke Gibbs – assistant engineering
- Adele Phillips – assistant engineering
- Josh Caulder – assistant engineering
- Joe Dougherty – assistant engineering
- Katie May – assistant engineering
- Matt Wolach – assistant engineering
- Oli Middleton – assistant engineering
- Alayna Rodgers - background vocals
- India Boodram - background vocals
- Ivan Jackson - trumpet

== Charts ==
=== Weekly charts ===
Weekly chart performance for "Music for a Sushi Restaurant"
| Chart (2022–2023) | Peak position |
|---|---|
| Argentina Hot 100 (Billboard) | 67 |
| Australia (ARIA) | 4 |
| Belgium (Ultratop 50 Flanders) | 47 |
| Canada Hot 100 (Billboard) | 7 |
| Canada AC (Billboard) | 35 |
| Canada CHR/Top 40 (Billboard) | 19 |
| Canada Hot AC (Billboard) | 21 |
| Denmark (Tracklisten) | 22 |
| France (SNEP) | 97 |
| Global 200 (Billboard) | 5 |
| Hungary (Stream Top 40) | 28 |
| Iceland (Tónlistinn) | 9 |
| Ireland (IRMA) | 8 |
| Italy (FIMI) | 68 |
| Japan Hot Overseas (Billboard Japan) | 18 |
| Netherlands (Single Top 100) | 14 |
| Mexico Ingles Airplay (Billboard) | 25 |
| New Zealand (Recorded Music NZ) | 4 |
| Norway (VG-lista) | 24 |
| Portugal (AFP) | 8 |
| San Marino (SMRRTV Top 50) | 6 |
| Slovakia Airplay (ČNS IFPI) | 89 |
| South Africa Streaming (TOSAC) | 31 |
| Spain (Promusicae) | 74 |
| Sweden (Sverigetopplistan) | 34 |
| UK Singles (Official Charts) | 3 |
| US Billboard Hot 100 | 8 |
| US Adult Pop Airplay (Billboard) | 18 |
| US Dance Airplay (Billboard) | 21 |
| US Pop Airplay (Billboard) | 9 |

=== Year-end charts ===
2022 year-end chart performance for "Music for a Sushi Restaurant"
| Chart (2022) | Position |
|---|---|
| Canada (Canadian Hot 100) | 94 |
| UK Singles (OCC) | 79 |
| US Mainstream Top 40 (Billboard) | 46 |

Year-end chart performance
| Chart (2025) | Position |
|---|---|
| Argentina Anglo Airplay (Monitor Latino) | 58 |

== Certifications ==
Certifications for "Music for a Sushi Restaurant"
| Region | Certification | Certified units/sales |
|---|---|---|
| Australia (ARIA) | Platinum | 70,000^{‡} |
| Brazil (Pro-Música Brasil) | 2× Platinum | 80,000^{‡} |
| Canada (Music Canada) | Platinum | 80,000^{‡} |
| Mexico (AMPROFON) | Platinum | 140,000^{‡} |
| New Zealand (RMNZ) | Platinum | 30,000^{‡} |
| Poland (ZPAV) | Gold | 25,000^{‡} |
| Spain (Promusicae) | Gold | 30,000^{‡} |
| United Kingdom (BPI) | Platinum | 600,000^{‡} |
| United States (RIAA) | Platinum | 1,000,000^{‡} |
^{‡} Sales+streaming figures based on certification alone.

== Release history ==
"Music for a Sushi Restaurant" release history
| Region | Date | Format(s) | Label(s) | Ref. |
|---|---|---|---|---|
| United Kingdom | 25 May 2022 | Digital download | Erskine; Columbia | |
| United States | 3 October 2022 | Hot adult contemporary radio | Columbia | |
| Italy | 27 October 2022 | Radio airplay | Sony | |
| United Kingdom | 2 December 2022 | CD single | Erskine; Columbia | |
