= This Was Supposed to Be the Future =

Studio album by the Nextmen
- Released: June 2007
- Genre: Hip-hop
- Length: 55:48
- Label: Antidote / Sanctuary
- Producer: The Nextmen

The Nextmen chronology
Get Over It (2003)	This Was Supposed to Be the Future (2007)	Join the Dots (2009)

Professional ratings
Review scores
Source	Rating
bbc.co.uk/music	"soulful and complete" Link
thebeatsurrender.co.uk	7/10 Link
celebritiesworldwide.com	6/10 Link
Future Music	9/10 Link
IndieLondon.co.uk	Link
Time Out London	Link
Touch Magazine	"an exceptional album" Link

This Was Supposed to Be the Future is the third studio album by the Nextmen. It was released in June 2007 on Antidote Records. It was a change in their sound; a prevalence of songs over rap tracks. Ten different vocalists appear on the album. Zarif appears the most, with three tracks, and LSK and Dynamite MC both appear twice.

At their album launch, the Nextmen performed as a full 10 piece band, with members of the Part Time Heroes.

== Artwork ==
Joe Pilbeam commissioned the Brighton-based illustrator Alex Young to create an image showing childhood fantasies of what the future might be like. Youngs's design, of the same theme, for the first single "Let It Roll" was voted the third best record cover of 2007 in a poll of 3,000 people carried out by Art Vinyl.

== Track listing ==
All music is composed by Brad Ellis & Dom Betmead.

No.	Title	Vocals	Length
1.	"Let It Roll"	Alice Russell	3:26
2.	"Blood Fire"	Dynamite MC	3:41
3.	"Did No Wrong"	Joe Dukie	4:17
4.	"Tuffen Up"	LSK	4:00
5.	"Knowledge Be Born"	Kidz In The Hall	3:18
6.	"Something Got You"	Zarif	3:35
7.	"Concentrate"	Dynamite MC	3:00
8.	"The Drop"	Joe Dukie	4:16
9.	"Let It Be"	Niney The Observer	4:22
10.	"Move"	Zarif	4:09
11.	"Piece of the Pie"	Demolition Man	4:37
12.	"Camera Tricks"	Sway and Bridgette Amofah	2:55
13.	"Memory Lane"	LSK	4:56
14.	"This Was Supposed To Be The Future"	Zarif	5:23
Total length:			55:38

Tracks 1, 3 and 14 feature trumpet by Toby Vane of Part Time Heroes. Track 8 features horns by Toby Laing and Joe Lindsay of Fat Freddy's Drop. Tracks 9 and 13 features horns by Toby Vane and Johnny Tarr.

== Singles ==
The first single was "Let It Roll", featuring Alice Russell.

The second single was "Something Got You", featuring singer-songwriter Zarif. It is one of three songs that Zarif recorded with The Nextmen in 2007, making her the vocalist featured most on the album. The music video was directed by Ricky Tart and was Zarif's first ever video shoot. The song was also released as an EP with tracks from Dynamite MC, Alice Russell and Bobby & Klein.
