= The Nextmen =

UK production/songwriting/DJ duo

- Also known as: Brad Baloo & Dom Search
- Origin: UK
- Genres: Hip-hop, soul
- Instruments: Guitar, keyboards
- Years active: 2000-present
- Labels: 75Ark, Antidote, Sanctuary, Fat City, Custom, Scenario, Nice Up, Trojan, Universal, Play Nice Recordings,
- Members: Brad Ellis; Dom Betmead
- Website: www.thenextmen.com

The Nextmen is a UK production/songwriting/DJ duo consisting of Dom Search (a.k.a. Dominic Betmead) and Brad Baloo (a.k.a. Brad Ellis). They combine hip-hop, drum & bass, dub, pop, soul, and other electronic and indie genres into their sounds, and have worked with artists from the UK and US.

== Musical career ==
The Nextmen have worked on remixes with Public Enemy, the Pharcyde, Blackalicious, Jeru the Damaja, Groove Armada, the Kooks, Fat Freddy's Drop, Rae & Christian, and more. Their first official remix was for UK hip-hop group London Posse on "Style" in 1996. They have created several mixtapes (including 2004's Personal Golf Instructions), and perform DJ sets, often fronted by an MC (usually MC Wrec, Dynamite MC, or Yungun), which include music from many genres.

The pair grew up in Cambridge, England, and are based in North London. Dom Search plays guitar and Brad Baloo plays keyboard.

They have performed at festivals such as Glastonbury, T in the Park, Bestival, V Festival, Isle of Wight Festival, Womad, The Big Chill, Good Vibrations, Grooving The Moo, Field Day, The Sydney Festival, and Shambala. They are also party DJs, having performed private sets for MTV, Cannes Film Festival, the Branson Family, Jade Jagger, in Pierre Cardin's Bubble Mansion, at Elizabeth Taylor's villa in Nice, in a Russian Cold War nuclear bunker in Moscow, and in ski resorts of the Alps.

They have toured throughout the UK, the US, Canada, Australia, New Zealand, Japan, China, Indonesia, Singapore, Hong Kong, Russia, France, Germany, Croatia, Spain, Switzerland, Bulgaria, Italy, Norway, and Hungary.

=== Releases ===
Their first album, 2000's Amongst the Madness, included performances from MCs from the US and UK. The second album Get Over It, released in 2003, featured American rapper J-Live and Cutty Ranks. Dom Search appeared on two Groove Armada albums, Vertigo and Goodbye Country, Hello Nightclub.

The 2005 reggae compilation Blunted in the Backroom on Antidote Records included two new Nextmen tracks, "Blood and Fire" featuring Dynamite MC, and "Piece of the Pie" featuring Demolition Man.

In June 2007, the Nextmen released their third studio album This Was Supposed to Be the Future on Antidote Records. It featured vocalists LSK, Dynamite MC, Zarif, Alice Russell, Sway, Bridgitte Amofah, and Kidz in the Hall. The first single was "Let It Roll", featuring Alice Russell. At their album launch, The Nextmen performed as a 10-piece band, with members of the Part Time Heroes.

In 2009, the Nextmen released their fourth studio album Join the Dots on Universal. It featured vocalists Dynamite MC, Betty Steeles, Ms Dynamite, Kivanc, and Johnny Tarr.

In 2018, the Nextmen released an album in collaboration with Gentleman's Dub Club called Pound for Pound featuring Dallas/Joe Dukie from Fat Freddy's Drop, Chali 2na, Kiko Bun, Gardna, Eva Lazarus, Hollie Cook, and Parly B.

The Nextmen also produced the title track of Plan B's 2006 album Who Needs Actions When You Got Words on 679 Artists.

The Nextmen created a mix CD for The Addict Beats Collective. They have also released a mix album called Friends and Family after the club night of the same name.

They started producing a monthly podcast in late 2010, the first episode of which hit No. 1 on the UK iTunes music chart.

In 2011, Dom Search worked on Plan B's album The Ballad of Belmarsh and Brad Baloo worked on the debut album for The Milk.

== Discography ==
=== Albums ===
- Amongst the Madness (2000, Scenario Records)
- Listen & Lose (2002, BOOM BOX)
- Get Over It (2003, Scenario Records)
- Blunted in the Backroom (2005, Antidote)
- Friends & Family (2006, Fat City/Pinnacle)
- This Was Supposed to Be the Future (2007, Antidote)
- Join the Dots (2009, Universal)
- Pound for Pound (2018, BMG)

=== Singles ===
- "Style (Next Men Remix)" – London Posse (1996, Bullitt Records)
- "Slide Up" (1997, Scenario Records)
- "Break the Mould" (1999, Scenario Records)
- "Amongst the Madness" (2000, Scenario Records / 75Ark)
- "Buck Foolish" (2000, Scenario Records / 75Ark)
- Rae & Christian, feat The Pharcyde & Kriminul, ”It Aint Nothin Like, The Nextmen Remix” (2000, Grand Central Records)
- "Turn It Up a Little" (2001, Scenario Records / 75Ark)
- "Turn It Up a Little – Remixes" (2001, Scenario Records / 75Ark)
- "I'll Try" (2002, Stonegroove Recordings)
- "The Next Trend / Liven It Up" (2002, Scenario Records)
- "Where You'll Find Me" (2002, Scenario Records)
- "Silent Weapon" (2003, Scenario Records)
- "High Score" (2003, Scenario Records)
- "Firewalking" (2003, Scenario Records)
- "Firewalking Remixes" (2003, Scenario Records)
- "90% of Me Is You" (2004, Scenario Records)
- "Blood Fire / Piece of the Pie" (2005, Antidote / Sanctuary Records)
- "Spin It Round" (2005, Custom / Fat City Recordings)
- "Knowledge Be Born" (2007)
- "Let It Roll" feat. Alice Russell (2007, Antidote / Sanctuary)
- "Something Got You" feat. Zarif (2007, Antidote / Sanctuary)
- "The Lions Den" feat. Ms. Dynamite and Andy Cato (2009, Sanctuary / Universal)
- "Round of Applause" feat. Dynamite MC (2009, Universal)
- "Sofa" feat. Pupajim (2010, Nice Up)
- "The Corner" feat. Nu-Logic and Kiko Bun (2016, Play Nice Recordings)

=== Album appearances ===
- Battlecreek 3 (2001, Illicit Recordings)
- Plug Famalam Mixtape (2006, White Label)
