= Join the Dots (The Nextmen album) =

Studio album by the Nextmen
- Released: 2009
- Genre: Hip-hop
- Length: 42:23
- Label: Sanctuary Records
- Producer: The Nextmen

The Nextmen chronology
This Was Supposed to Be the Future (2007)	Join the Dots (2009)

Professional ratings
Review scores
Source	Rating
BBC Music	Positive

Join the Dots is the fourth studio album by UK-based duo the Nextmen, released in 2009 on Sanctuary Records.

== Track listing ==
No.	Title	Writer(s)	Length
1.	"Join the Dots"	Betmead, Ellis, Ragovoy	4:06
2.	"Round of Applause" (featuring Dynamite MC)	Betmead, Ellis, Smith, Neville, Nocentelli, Porter Jr., Modeliste	4:17
3.	"Whisper Up" (featuring Betty Steeles)	Ellis, Betmead, Ladimeji, Hatchett	3:21
4.	"The Lion's Den" (featuring Ms Dynamite and Andy Cato)	Betmead, Ellis, McLean-Daley, Cato, Sutter	3:55
5.	"Love Someone" (featuring Kivanc)	Betmead, Ellis, Sezen	3:18
6.	"Rockets" (featuring Jonny Tarr)	Ellis, Betmead, Tarr, Hatchett	4:32
7.	"Stay at Home"	Betmead, Ellis	3:23
8.	"Facts" (featuring Jimmy Screech)	Ellis, Betmead, Bradshaw	4:06
9.	"Red Setter"	Betmead, Ellis, Feliciano, Feliciano	3:46
10.	"So Many Girls" (featuring Dynamite MC)	Betmead, Ellis, Smith, Hibbert	4:12
11.	"Burn" (featuring Lindsay West)	Betmead, Ellis, West	3:29
Total length:			42:23

== Personnel ==
Songwriting

- Dominic Betmead – composer
- B. Ellis – composer
- F. Hibbert – composer
- J. Modesliste – composer
- A. Neville – composer
- L. Nocentelli – composer
- Jerry Ragovoy – composer
- J. Sutter – composer

Technical

- Brad Baloo – arranging, engineering, mixing and production
- Tim Debney – mastering
- Alan Mawdsley – mixing
- Joe Pilbeam – album artwork
- Dom Search – arranging, engineering, mixing and production
