= Box of Secrets (song) =

Single by Zarif

from the album Box of Secrets
- Released: 16 August 2010
- Recorded: 2009 (solo version); 2010 (album version featuring Mz. Bratt)
- Length: 3:42
- Label: RCA, Sony BMG
- Songwriter(s): Zarif

Zarif singles chronology
"Let Me Back" (2009)	"Box of Secrets" (2010)	"Over" (2011)

"Box of Secrets" is the second single by singer/songwriter Zarif and the second single taken from her debut album Box of Secrets. The song contains samples from the song "Sing, Sing, Sing" by Louis Prima and the commercial single version contains a rap from Mz Bratt.

== Background ==
"Box of Secrets" originally featured on an advert for Sky1 in 2009 and later was released as a free download for a limited time period. In 2010, it was released as the second single from Zarif's debut album, also titled Box of Secrets on 16 August 2010, following her departure from RCA / Sony BMG. It will be released on her own label, Bright Pink Records. The single and video version of the song features a new rap by British MC Mz Bratt.

== Promotion ==
Zarif performed "Box of Secrets" on GMTV in 2009.

== Music video ==
The music video for "Box of Secrets" premiered on 2 June 2010 on Zarif's YouTube account. The video was directed by Andy Hylton and Mz Bratt features in the video. The video features Zarif walking into a photo booth, which transports her to several 1920s Jazz age scapes.

== Track listings ==
Digital download

1. "Box of Secrets" (featuring Mz Bratt) (Radio Edit) - 3:42
2. "Box of Secrets" (Original Mix) - 3:42
3. "Box of Secrets" (Redlight Remix) - 3:31
4. "Box of Secrets" (Cyantific & Wilkinson Remix) - 5:24
5. "Box of Secrets" (Midland Remix) - 6:51
6. "Box of Secrets" (Ripper Remix) - 5:36

== Reviews ==
- The Guardian - "a vaudevillian big band extravaganza"
