= Denai Moore =

British-Jamaican artist and singer

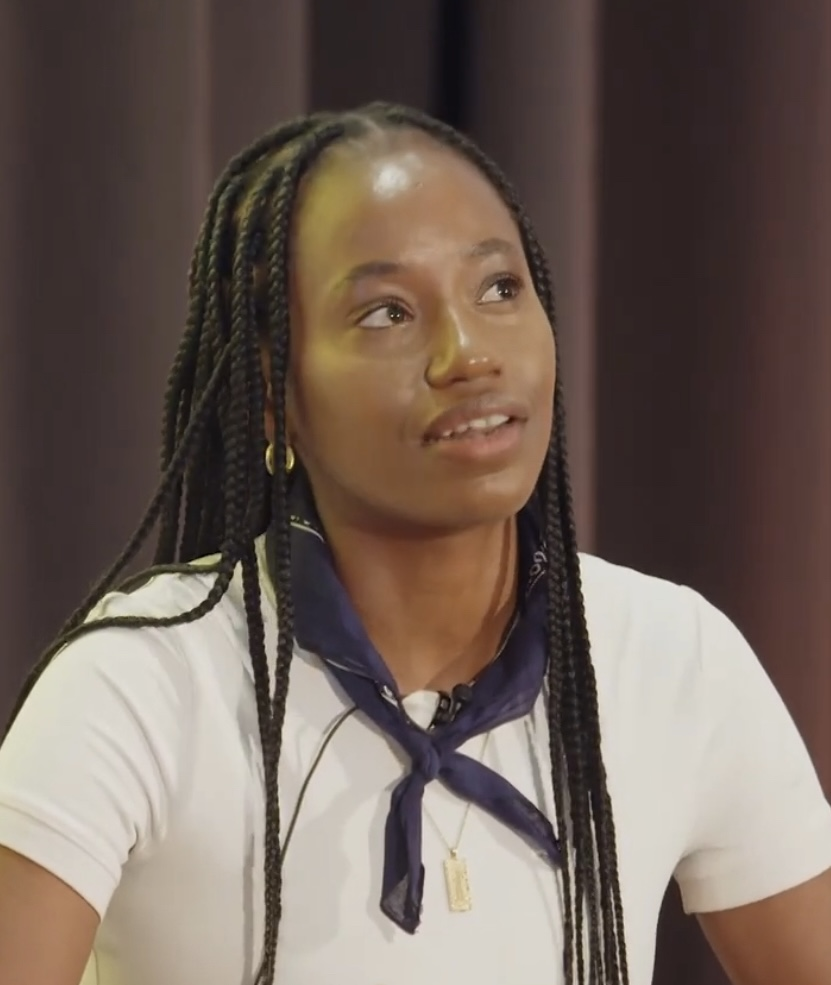
- Moore at the British Library in 2023

Background information
- Born: Spanish Town, Jamaica
- Genres: Soul; folk; R&B
- Occupations: Singer; songwriter
- Instruments: Vocals; guitar
- Years active: 2013–present

Denai Moore is a British-Jamaican musician, chef and cookbook author. Her most recent album Modern Dread was released in July 2020. Moore's musical style is a mix of soul, folk, electronic, and other styles, and she has said she takes influence from Lauryn Hill and Bon Iver. She refers to her own music as "genre free". She has been described as "one to watch out for" by The Fader.

== Early life and career ==
Moore was born in Spanish Town, Jamaica, where she learned to play keyboards from her father. Her family moved to Stratford, London when she was 10. After she left school, she played in small clubs in East London, and appeared as a guest vocalist on SBTRKT's 2014 album Wonder Where We Land. She later signed with Because Music.

Moore's first single, "The Lake", was produced by Plan B. Her album Elsewhere was released in 2015 and produced by Rodaidh McDonald (The xx, Savages). Her second album We Used To Bloom was released in 2017. Modern Dread was released in 2020; in a review of the album The Guardian noted that "Moore’s hypnotically sinister beats take the listener on a surrealist journey into a fantasy world."

Moore became a vegan in 2015. In 2017, Moore founded a vegan supper club called Dee's Table.

== Cookbook ==
In April 2023, Hardie Grant published Moore's cookbook, Plentiful: Vegan Jamaican Recipes to Repeat. In July, the New York Times covered a dinner in honor of the cookbook at the Carl Freedman Gallery in Margate. The dinner was held at the opening of an art show curated by fashion designer Ronan Mckenzie.

=== Reception ===
Mayukh Sen of The Washington Post said the book's "recipes imaginatively take advantage of the bounties of Jamaica." Avery Yale Kamila of the Portland Press Herald included the book on her list of the best plant-based books of 2023. Fliss Freborn of National Geographic included the book on her list of the best new summer cookbooks.
