= Box of Secrets (Zarif album) =

Studio album by Zarif
- Released: 30 August 2010
- Recorded: 2008–2010
- Length: 33:46
- Label: Bright Pink Records
- Producer: Zarif, Tommy D, Blair Makichan, Full Phatt, Utters, Fraser T Smith

Singles from Box of Secrets
- 1. "Let Me Back" Released: April 5, 2009; 2. "Box of Secrets" Released: August 16, 2010; 3. "Over" Released: March 27, 2011

Professional ratings
Review scores
Source	Rating
Evening Standard	4/5 stars
Fame Magazine	(favourable)
The Guardian	3/5 stars
Yahoo! Music	(favourable)

Box of Secrets is the debut album by singer-songwriter Zarif. It was released on 30 August 2010.

== Background ==
Box of Secrets features the three singles "Let Me Back", "Box of Secrets", and "Over".

Other tracks that feature on the album include "California", "Words" and "Summer in your Eyes", "Breakout", "Silence Room", "Seen It All Before" and "Can't Do Nothing". It features production by Tommy D (Corinne Bailey Rae, Kanye West, Jay-Z), Blair Makichan (Lily Allen), Full Phatt (The Rolling Stones, Christina Milian) and Fraser T Smith (Kano, James Morrison).

Although Zarif released "Let Me Back" on Sony BMG / RCA and recorded the album under that label, Zarif released Box of Secrets on her own imprint, Bright Pink Records.

== Singles ==
- "Let Me Back" was released as Zarif's debut single on 5 April 2009. The song features a video directed by Rebel Alliance.
- "Box of Secrets", the album's title track, was issued as the second single from the album on 16 August 2010. The single version features a rap by Mz. Bratt, which was not featured in the original version of the song. The "Box of Secrets" music video was directed by Andy Hylton.
- "Over" was due to be released as the second single from Box of Secrets on 10 August 2009 but was subsequently postponed. The song was then released as the third single from the album on 27 March 2011. The music video was directed by Kinga Burza in 2009.

== Track listing ==
The track listing for Box of Secrets is as follows:

1. "Box of Secrets" - 3:42
2. "Seen It All Before" - 3:40
3. "Breakout" - 3:20
4. "The Day The Music Left" - 3:41
5. "Over" - 3:20
6. "You Take The Darkness" - 4:00
7. "California" - 4:07
8. "Silence Room" - 3:45
9. "Stop What You Are Doing" - 3:50
10. "Words" - 4:23
11. "Let Me Back" - 3:40
12. "Summer In Your Eyes" - 4:05
13. "Box of Secrets" (featuring Mz Bratt) (Single Version) - 3:42

Original 2009 track listing

The Box of Secrets album was originally due for release in 2009 after the release of the single "Over". However, due to the single being cancelled, this edition of the album remains unreleased. This edition contains a different running order and "Can't Do Nothing" which was left off the final track listing.

1. "Let Me Back" - 3:40
2. "California" - 4:07
3. "Over" - 3:20
4. "Box of Secrets" (original solo version) - 3:42
5. "Can't Do Nothing" - 3:18
6. "Summer In Your Eyes" - 4:05
7. "Breakout" 3:20
8. "Silence Room" - 3:45
9. "Seen It All Before" - 3:40
10. "Words" - 4:23
11. "You Take The Darkness" - 4:00
12. "Stop What You Are Doing" 3:50
