= Harry Betmead =

English footballer and cricketer

Personal information
- Full name: Harry Betmead
- Date of birth: 11 April 1912
- Place of birth: Grimsby, Lincolnshire, England
- Date of death: 26 August 1984 (aged 72)
- Place of death: Middlesbrough, Cleveland, England
- Height: 6 ft 1 in (1.85 m)
- Position: Centre-half

Youth career
- Hay Cross

Senior career*
Years	Team	Apps	(Gls)
1930–1947	Grimsby Town	296	(10)
Total		296	(10)

International career
1937	England	1	(0)
1939	Football Association XL	2	(0)
- * Club domestic league appearances and goals

Harry Betmead (11 April 1912 – 26 August 1984) was an English footballer who played for Grimsby Town, as well as the England national side. He also played cricket for Lincolnshire. He spent his entire 17-year career with Grimsby, from 1930 to 1947, and is one of only three players to win an England cap whilst at the club (the other two being teammates Jackie Bestall and George Tweedy). He helped the club to win the Second Division title in 1933–34 and to reach two FA Cup semi-finals. After retiring from the game he went into business in Hertfordshire.

== Early and personal life ==
Harry Betmead was born on 11 April 1912 in Grimsby, Lincolnshire to Ernest and Alice (née Lamming). He married Margaret Grace Marshall in July 1939. He was a right-hand batsman for Lincolnshire County Cricket Club. He died on 26 August 1984 at South Cleveland Hospital in Middlesbrough, Cleveland; his ashes were scattered at Blundell Park.

== Club career ==
Betmead was playing for local side Hay Cross when he was signed for Grimsby Town by Wilf Gillow in October 1930, aged 18 years old. He debuted almost a year later on 15 September 1931 against Bolton Wanderers. He quickly established himself as one of the first names on the "Mariners" team sheet and remained at the club for the whole of his career despite considerable interest from bigger clubs. Grimsby suffered relegation out of the First Division in 1931–32, before finishing 13th in the Second Division in 1932–33. They won promotion as the division's champions in 1933–34. Town finished fifth in 1934–35. They dropped to 17th place in 1935–36, though reached the semi-finals of the FA Cup, where they were beaten 1–0 by Arsenal. The Blundell Park club then posted 12th, 20th, and 10th-place finishes in 1936–37, 1937–38, and 1938–39. They also reached the semi-finals of the FA Cup again in 1939, this time losing out 5–0 to Wolverhampton Wanderers at Old Trafford.

During the war he became a physical training instructor in the army, also guesting for Heart of Midlothian, Aldershot, Chesterfield and Port Vale. He also managed to play 40 games and score five goals for Grimsby in the war years.

After normal football resumed, Betmead helped the club to post a 16th-place finish in the top flight in 1946–47. He retired in December 1947. He had scored ten goals in 296 league appearances for the club.

== International career ==
Called up to the England squad, he played in the 8–0 win over Finland in Helsinki on 20 May 1937. Betmead toured South Africa with an English FA side in 1939 and was captain in two of the unofficial internationals against the full South Africa team.

== Style of play ==
Betmead played at centre-half; he was a strong tackler and had excellent aerial ability.

== Career statistics ==
Appearances and goals by club, season and competition
Club	Season	League			FA Cup		Total	
Club	Season	Division	Apps	Goals	Apps	Goals	Apps	Goals
Grimsby Town	1931–32	First Division	17	2	0	0	17	2
Grimsby Town	1932–33	Second Division	30	2	2	0	32	2
Grimsby Town	1933–34	Second Division	42	0	2	0	44	0
Grimsby Town	1934–35	First Division	26	1	0	0	26	1
Grimsby Town	1935–36	First Division	35	0	5	0	40	0
Grimsby Town	1936–37	First Division	38	1	2	0	40	1
Grimsby Town	1937–38	First Division	38	1	1	0	39	1
Grimsby Town	1938–39	First Division	36	3	7	0	43	3
Grimsby Town	1946–47	First Division	34	0	0	0	34	0
Career total			296	10	19	0	315	10

== Honours ==
Grimsby Town

- Football League Second Division: 1933–34
