= Late Night Talking =

2022 single by Harry Styles

- UK limited digital and CD single cover. The international exclusive digital single and physical formats use different covers.

Single by Harry Styles

from the album Harry's House
- B-side: "Late Night Talking" (Instrumental)
- Released: 21 June 2022
- Genre: Synth-pop; R&B
- Length: 2:58
- Label: Erskine; Columbia
- Songwriters: Harry Styles; Thomas Hull
- Producers: Kid Harpoon; Tyler Johnson

Harry Styles singles chronology
"As It Was" (2022)	"Late Night Talking" (2022)	"Music for a Sushi Restaurant" (2022)

Alternative cover
- Physical single cover

Music video
- "Late Night Talking" on YouTube

"Late Night Talking" is a song by English singer-songwriter Harry Styles. The song was released to US pop radio as the second single from his third studio album, Harry's House, on 21 June 2022. A music video for the song was later released on 13 July 2022, in which Styles is shown exploring the world on different beds.

== Background and composition ==
On 1 April 2022, Styles released the lead single "As It Was" to critical acclaim and commercial success. The song was debuted during his Coachella performance. "Late Night Talking" was described as a "glossy R&B shifter" that fills "every available space with some or other moving part, right down to vocal parts mimicking brass".

== Music video ==
The video, directed by Bradley & Pablo and released on 13 July 2022, finds Styles following a portal in his own bed that leads him to an array of other beds — one in an art gallery, another in a restaurant, a theatre, and another that speeds through the streets of London past Buckingham Palace. The clip also comes complete with a pillow fight and Styles officiating a bed-ridden wedding, before falling through the sky on his bed. Critics have interpreted this video as a discussion into how Styles' romantic and sexual entanglements are publicised with Pride Magazine as the beds jump from scene to scene in increasingly public spectacles.

== Accolades ==
Awards and nominations for "Late Night Talking"
Organization	Year	Category	Result	Ref.
MTV Video Music Awards	2022	Song of Summer	Nominated	
MTV MIAW Awards	2023	Galactic Hit of the Year	Nominated	

== Live performance ==
He performed a live version of the song on the Today Show on May 19, and also included the song in a set he performed for BBC Radio 1, along with "As It Was", "Boyfriends" and a cover of "Wet Dream" by Wet Leg on 24 May 2022.

== Commercial performance ==
"Late Night Talking" made its debut at number 4 on the Billboard Hot 100 for the week of June 4, 2022, following the release of Harry's House. After being officially released as the second single from the album, the song peaked at number 3 in its sixteenth week on the chart, dated September 17, 2022.

In the United Kingdom, where it was first released as a promotional single, the song debuted at number 2 on the singles chart dated 27 May 2022. The song returned to the Top 10 after being released as the second single from Harry's House but did not reach a new peak.

Globally, the song reached number 2 on the Billboard Global 200 and appeared in the Top 10 of the official charts of Australia, Canada, Iceland, Ireland, New Zealand, Portugal, among others.

== Credits and personnel ==
Credits are adapted from Qobuz.

- Harry Styles – vocals, songwriting
- Kid Harpoon – songwriting, production, bass, guitar, drum machine, drums, electric guitar, synthesiser, programmer, tambourine
- Tyler Johnson – production, background vocals
- Jeremy Hatcher – programming, recording
- Randy Merrill – mastering
- Spike Stent – mixing
- Luke Gibbs – assistant engineering
- Adele Phillips – assistant engineering
- Josh Caulder – assistant engineering
- Joe Dougherty – assistant engineering
- Matt Wolach – assistant engineering
- Alayna Rodgers - background vocals

== Track listing ==
- Various Single
1. "Late Night Talking" – 2:57
2. "Late Night Talking" (Instrumental) – 2:53

== Charts ==
=== Weekly charts ===
Weekly chart performance for "Late Night Talking"
Chart (2022–2024)	Peak position
Argentina Hot 100 (Billboard)	36
Australia (ARIA)	2
Austria (Ö3 Austria Top 40)	9
Belgium (Ultratop 50 Flanders)	10
Belgium (Ultratop 50 Wallonia)	14
Brazil Airplay (Crowley Charts)	74
Canada Hot 100 (Billboard)	3
Canada AC (Billboard)	3
Canada CHR/Top 40 (Billboard)	2
Canada Hot AC (Billboard)	1
CIS Airplay (TopHit)	47
Croatia (Billboard)	10
Croatia International Airplay (Top lista)	6
Czech Republic Airplay (ČNS IFPI)	9
Czech Republic Singles Digital (ČNS IFPI)	6
Denmark (Tracklisten)	9
Estonia Airplay (TopHit)	1
Finland (Suomen virallinen lista)	15
France (SNEP)	32
Germany (GfK)	83
Global 200 (Billboard)	2
Greece International (IFPI)	2
Hungary (Rádiós Top 40)	3
Hungary (Single Top 40)	40
Hungary (Stream Top 40)	14
Iceland (Tónlistinn)	4
Ireland (IRMA)	2
Italy (FIMI)	25
Japan Hot Overseas (Billboard Japan)	9
Lebanon Airplay (Lebanese Top 20)	17
Lithuania (AGATA)	5
Luxembourg (Billboard)	7
Malaysia International (RIM)	6
Mexico Airplay (Billboard)	1
Netherlands (Dutch Top 40)	11
Netherlands (Single Top 100)	6
New Zealand (Recorded Music NZ)	2
Norway (VG-lista)	9
Philippines (Billboard)	25
Poland Airplay (ZPAV)	7
Portugal (AFP)	3
San Marino (SMRRTV Top 50)	1
Singapore (RIAS)	5
Slovakia Airplay (ČNS IFPI)	44
Slovakia Singles Digital (ČNS IFPI)	4
South Africa Streaming (TOSAC)	15
South Korea Download (Gaon)	130
Spain (Promusicae)	49
Sweden (Sverigetopplistan)	9
Switzerland (Schweizer Hitparade)	11
UK Singles (Official Charts)	2
US Billboard Hot 100	3
US Adult Contemporary (Billboard)	7
US Adult Pop Airplay (Billboard)	1
US Dance Airplay (Billboard)	8
US Pop Airplay (Billboard)	1
Vietnam (Vietnam Hot 100)	53

=== Monthly charts ===
Monthly chart performance for "Late Night Talking"
Chart (2022–2023)	Peak position
CIS Airplay (TopHit)	53
Czech Republic (Rádio Top 100)	25
Czech Republic (Singles Digitál Top 100)	36
Estonia Airplay (TopHit)	1
Slovakia (Rádio Top 100)	60
Slovakia (Singles Digitál Top 100)	26

=== Year-end charts ===
2022 year-end chart performance for "Late Night Talking"
Chart (2022)	Position
Australia (ARIA)	37
Belgium (Ultratop 50 Flanders)	61
Belgium (Ultratop 50 Wallonia)	80
Canada (Canadian Hot 100)	21
Denmark (Tracklisten)	90
Global 200 (Billboard)	62
Lithuania (AGATA)	55
Netherlands (Dutch Top 40)	29
Netherlands (Single Top 100)	65
Poland (ZPAV)	61
UK Singles (OCC)	32
US Billboard Hot 100	25
US Adult Contemporary (Billboard)	28
US Adult Top 40 (Billboard)	16
US Mainstream Top 40 (Billboard)	12

2023 year-end chart performance for "Late Night Talking"
Chart (2023)	Position
Estonia Airplay (TopHit)	3
Global 200 (Billboard)	187
Hungary (Rádiós Top 40)	33
US Adult Contemporary (Billboard)	11

2024 year-end chart performance for "Late Night Talking"
Chart (2024)	Position
Estonia Airplay (TopHit)	182

Year-end chart performance
Chart (2025)	Position
Argentina Anglo Airplay (Monitor Latino)	33
Chile Airplay (Monitor Latino)	71

== Certifications ==
Certifications for "Late Night Talking"
Region	Certification	Certified units/sales
Australia (ARIA)	3× Platinum	210,000^{‡}
Brazil (Pro-Música Brasil)	2× Diamond	320,000^{‡}
Canada (Music Canada)	3× Platinum	240,000^{‡}
Denmark (IFPI Danmark)	Platinum	90,000^{‡}
France (SNEP)	Platinum	200,000^{‡}
Italy (FIMI)	Platinum	100,000^{‡}
Mexico (AMPROFON)	2× Platinum+Gold	350,000^{‡}
New Zealand (RMNZ)	2× Platinum	60,000^{‡}
Poland (ZPAV)	Platinum	50,000^{‡}
Portugal (AFP)	Platinum	10,000^{‡}
Spain (Promusicae)	Platinum	60,000^{‡}
Switzerland (IFPI Switzerland)	Gold	10,000^{‡}
United Kingdom (BPI)	2× Platinum	1,200,000^{‡}
United States (RIAA)	2× Platinum	2,000,000^{‡}
Streaming
Greece (IFPI Greece)	Gold	1,000,000^{†}
Sweden (GLF)	Gold	4,000,000^{†}
^{‡} Sales+streaming figures based on certification alone.^{†} Streaming-only figures based on certification alone.

== Release history ==
"Late Night Talking" release history
Region	Date	Format(s)	Version	Label(s)	Ref.
United Kingdom	25 May 2022 (Note: Release as a promotional single.)	Digital download	Original	Erskine; Columbia	
United States	21 June 2022	Contemporary hit radio	Original	Columbia	
Italy	15 July 2022	Radio airplay	Original	Sony	
United Kingdom	5 August 2022	CD single	Original	Erskine; Columbia	
Various	18 August 2022	Cassette; CD single; 7-inch vinyl	Original; instrumental	Erskine; Columbia	
Various	2 September 2022	Digital download; streaming	Original; instrumental	Erskine; Columbia	
