= List of fashion events =

This is the list of fashion weeks/events/shows held annually or two times a year all around the world. The "Big Four" events are the Paris Fashion Week, Milan Fashion Week, New York Fashion Week, and London Fashion Week.

Copenhagen Fashion Week is often described as the "fifth fashion capital".

The list is ordered by continent and country:

== Africa ==
=== Nigeria ===
- Lagos Fashion Week
- Port Harcourt International Fashion Week

=== Senegal ===
- Dakar Fashion Week

=== Uganda ===
- Afri Art Fashion Show
- Abryanz Style & Fashion Show

== America ==
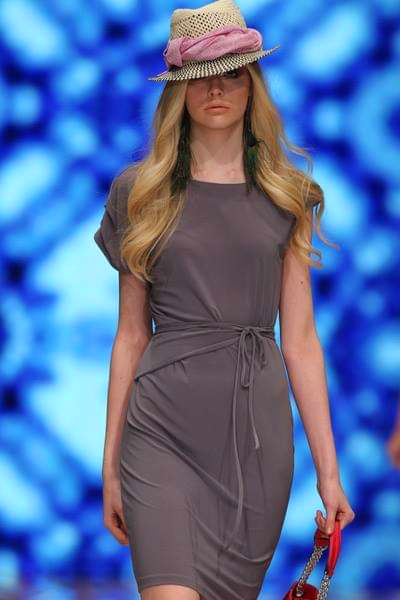
A model walking Toronto Fashion Week.

=== Argentina ===
- Buenos Aires Fashion Week

=== Bolivia ===
- Bolivia Fashion Week

=== Brazil ===
- Rio Fashion Week
- São Paulo Fashion Week

=== Canada ===
- Vancouver Fashion Week
- Fashion Cares
- Montréal Fashion and Design Festival
- Ottawa Fashion Week
- Toronto Fashion Week

=== Chile ===
- Elite Model Look Chile

=== Jamaica ===
- Kingston Bridal Week

=== Mexico ===
- Mexico City Fashion Week

=== United States ===
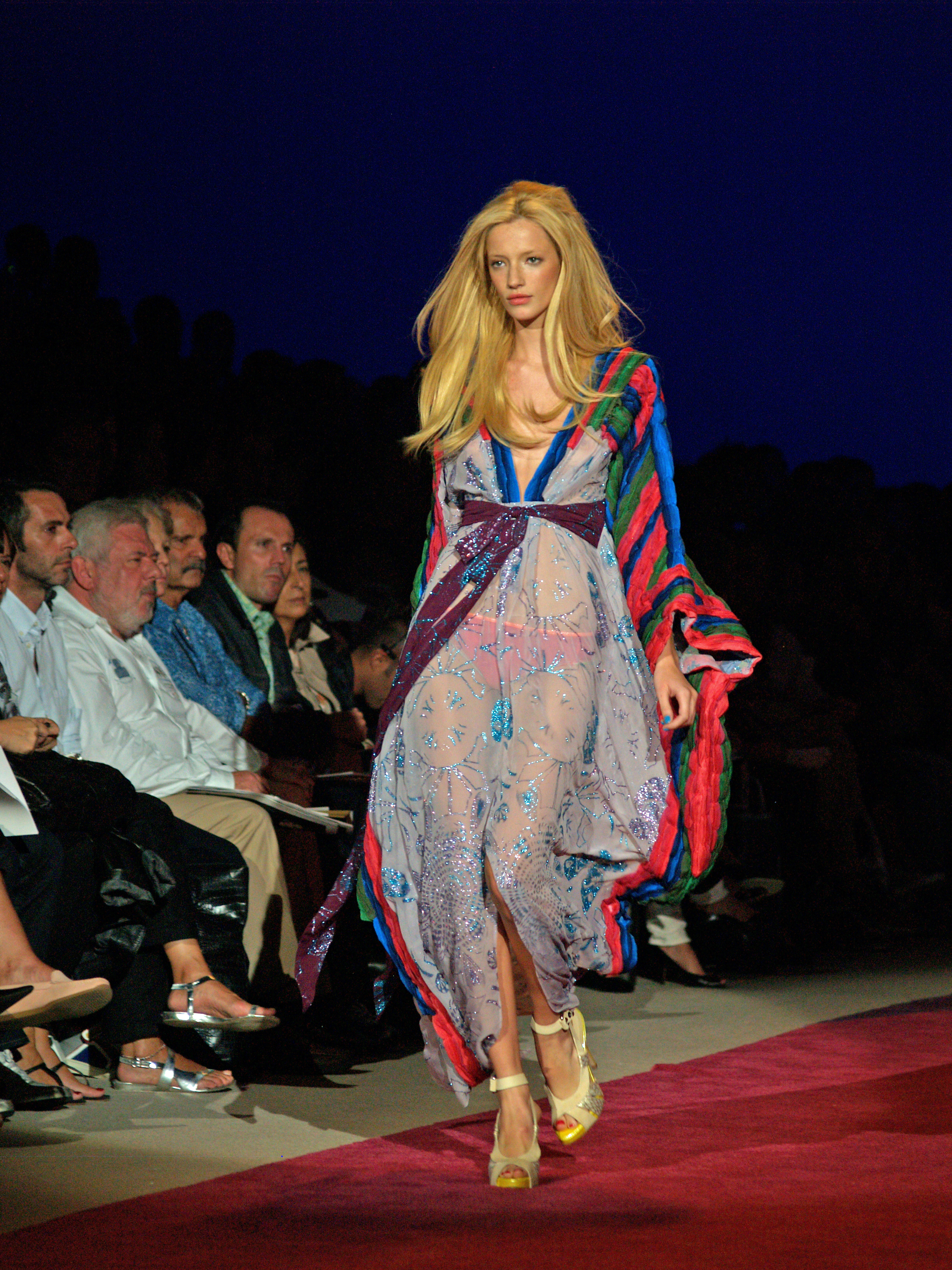
A model walks the runway at the Custo Barcelona Spring 2009 show in New York.

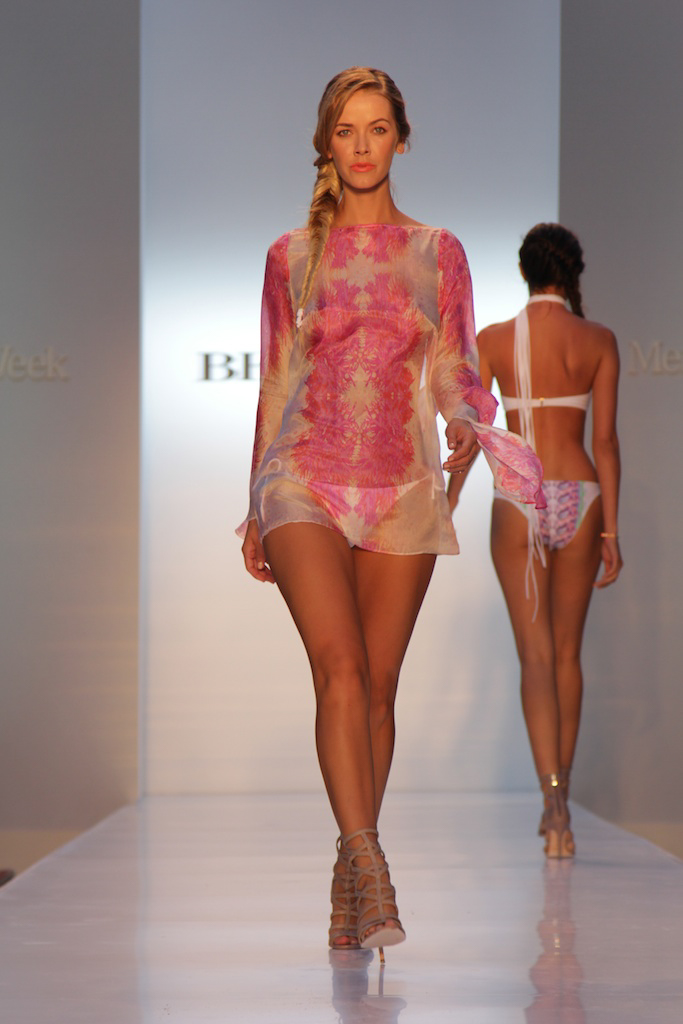
Olivia Jordan walking the runway wearing a design be Belusso during the Mercedes Benz Fashion Week

- African Fashion Week Houston
- Aspen Fashion Week
- Atlanta Fashion Week
- Atlanta International Fashion Week
- Atlantic City Fashion Week
- Austin Fashion Week
- Baltimore Fashion Week
- Boston Fashion Week
- Birmingham Fashion Week
- Chicago Fashion Week
- Christian Fashion Week
- Colorado Fashion Week
- Delray Beach Fashion Week
- Detroit Fashion Week
- DC Fashion Week
- Fashion in Film Festival
- Fashion Rocks
- Fashion Week Cleveland
- Fashion Week Minnesota
- Ford Models Supermodel of the World
- Glamorama
- Hair Wars
- Kansas City Fashion Week
- Latin Fashion Week Colorado
- Los Angeles Fashion Week
- Nashville Fashion Week
- Men's Fashion Week
- Men's Fashion Week Los Angeles
- Mercedes-Benz Fashion Week Miami
- Met Gala
- Miami Fashion Week
- Miami Swim Week
- New York Fashion Week (capital)
- Paper Fashion Show
- Pittsburgh Fashion Week
- Portland Fashion Week
- Red Ball
- Rip the Runway
- Victoria's Secret Fashion Show

== Asia ==
=== Bangladesh ===
- Dhaka Fashion Week

=== China ===
- Centrestage
- China Fashion Week
- Shanghai Fashion Week

==== Hong Kong ====
- Hong Kong Fashion Week for Fall/Winter

=== India ===
- Bangalore Fashion Week
- India Fashion Week
- India Kids Fashion Week
- India Runway Week
- Lakme Fashion Week
- Mysore Fashion Week

=== Indonesia ===
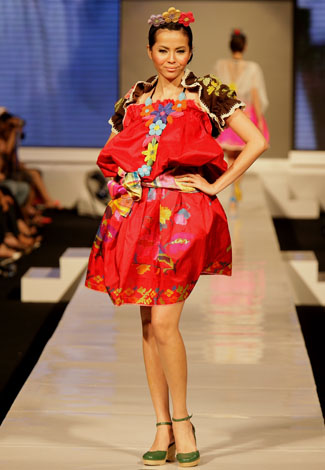
Models on the ramp of Jakarta Fashion Week

- Indonesia Fashion Week
- Jakarta Fashion Week
- Jember Fashion Carnaval

=== Japan ===
- Girls Award
- Kansai Collection
- Kobe Collection
- Sapporo Collection
- Tokyo Fashion Week (ja) (capital)
- Tokyo Girls Collection

=== Malaysia ===
- Kuala Lumpur Fashion Week
- Borneo Fashion Week

=== Mongolia ===
- Goyol Fashion Festival

=== Nepal ===
- Nepal Fashion Week

=== Pakistan ===
- Pakistan Fashion Week
- Islamabad Fashion Week
- Karachi Fashion Week
- Lahore Fashion Week
- PFDC Sunsilk Fashion Week

=== Philippines ===
- Philippine Fashion Week
- Manila Fashion Festival

=== Singapore ===
- Asia Fashion Exchange
- Men's Fashion Week
- Singapore Fashion Festival
- Singapore Fashion Week

=== South Korea ===
- Daegu Collection
- Seoul Fashion Week

=== Taiwan ===
- Taipei Fashion Week
- Taipei IN Style

=== Sri Lanka ===
- Colombo Fashion Week
- Mercedes-Benz Fashion Week - Sri Lanka

=== United Arab Emirates ===
- Arab Fashion Week

== Europe ==
=== Denmark ===
- Copenhagen Fashion Week
- Gallery Int Fashion Fair

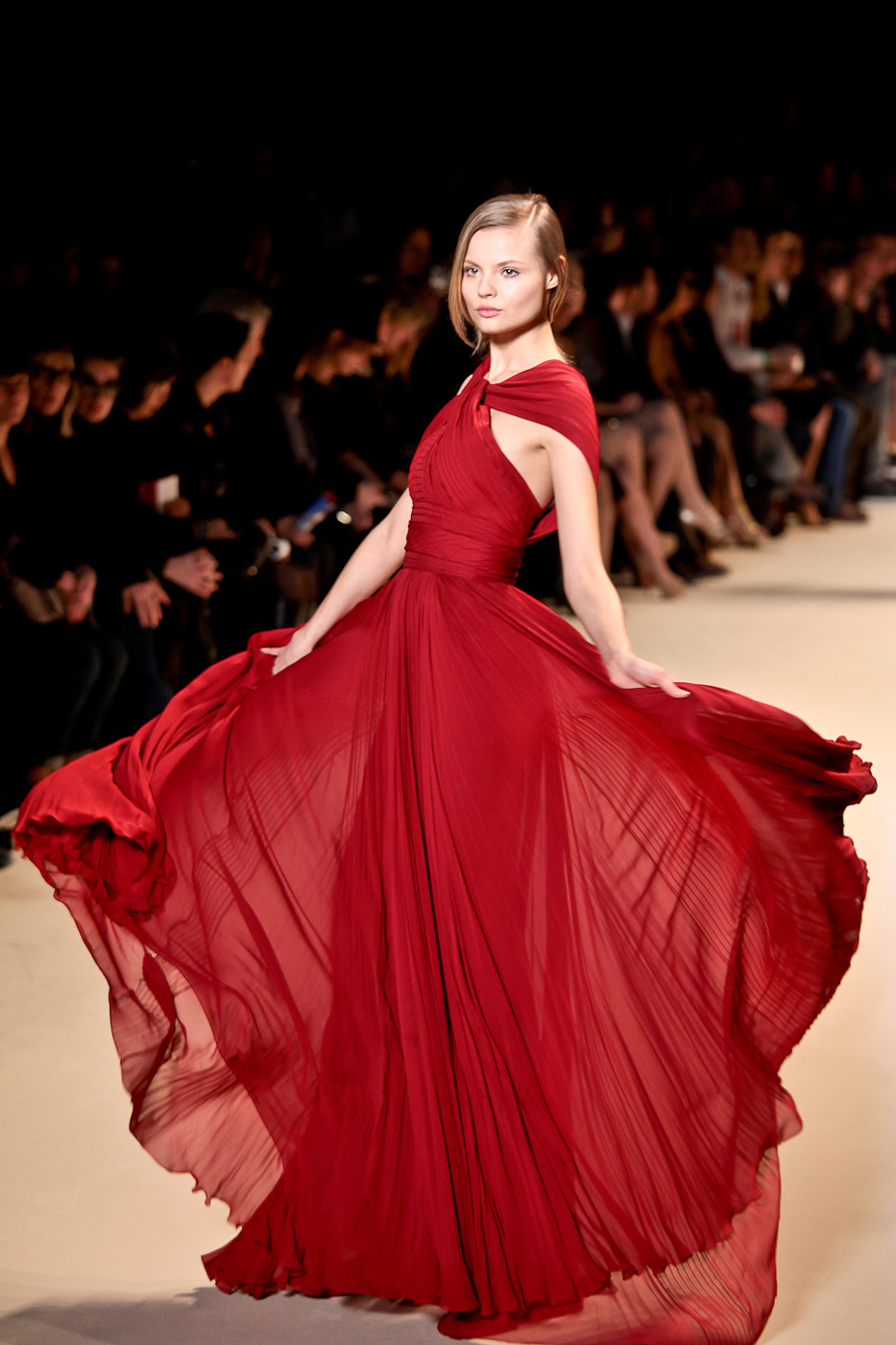
Magdalena Frackowiak at Paris Fashion Week Fall 2011

=== France ===
- Elite Model Look
- Bal des débutantes
- Paris Fashion Week (capital)
  - Fall 2008 fashion weeks
  - Fall 2023 fashion weeks
  - Men's Fashion Week

=== Georgia ===
- Mercedes-Benz Fashion Week Tbilisi
- Tbilisi Fashion Week

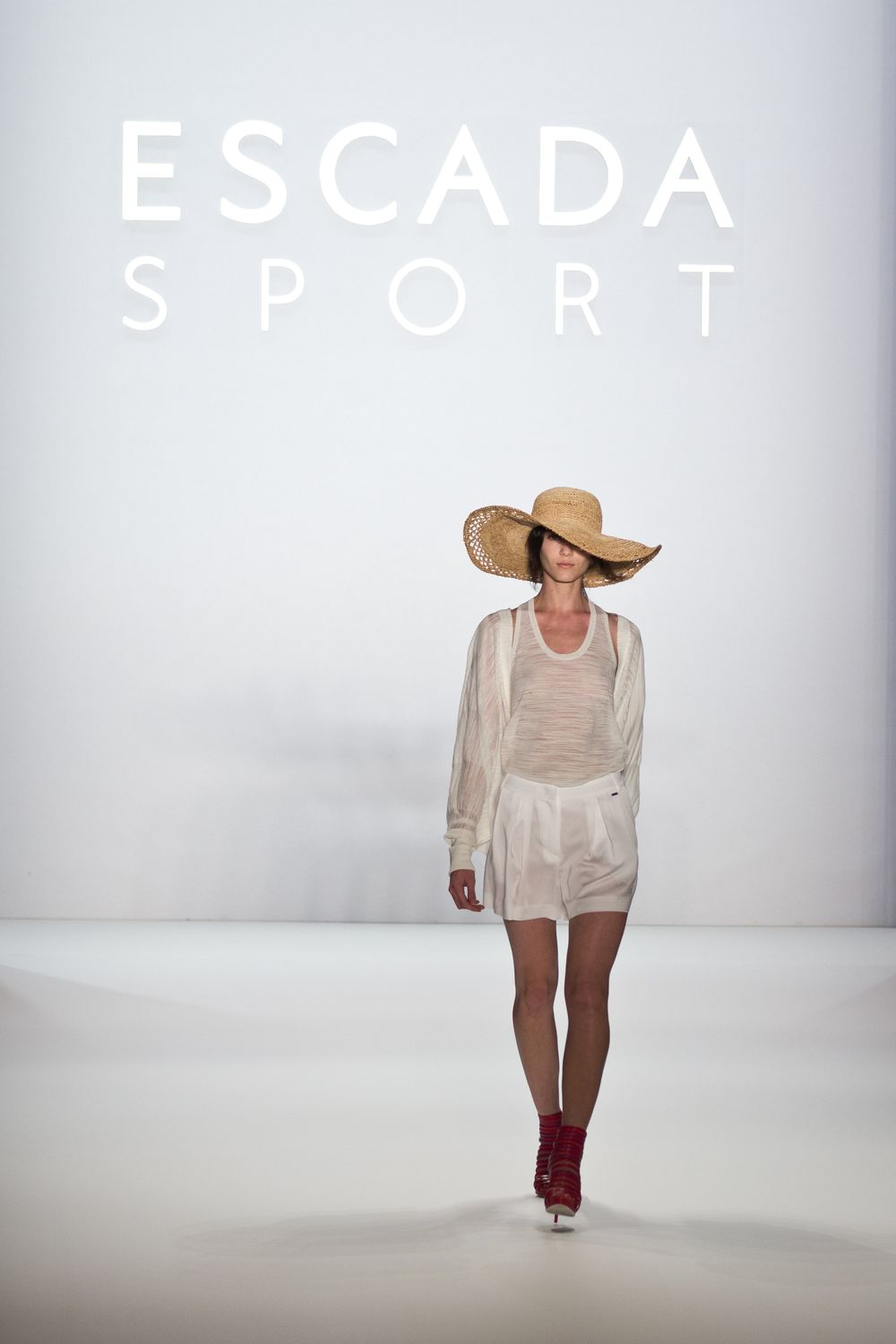
Escada show opening look at Berlin Fashion Week spring/summer season 2013

=== Germany ===
- Berlin Fashion Week
  - Bread & Butter
  - Stylenite by Michael Michalsky

=== Hungary ===
- Budapest Fashion Week

=== Italy ===
- Milan Fashion Week (capital)
  - Fall 2008 fashion weeks
  - Fall 2023 fashion weeks
- Pitti Immagine

=== Netherlands ===
- Amsterdam Fashion Week
- The Royal Catwalk
- The Canal Catwalk

=== Portugal ===
- Portugal Fashion

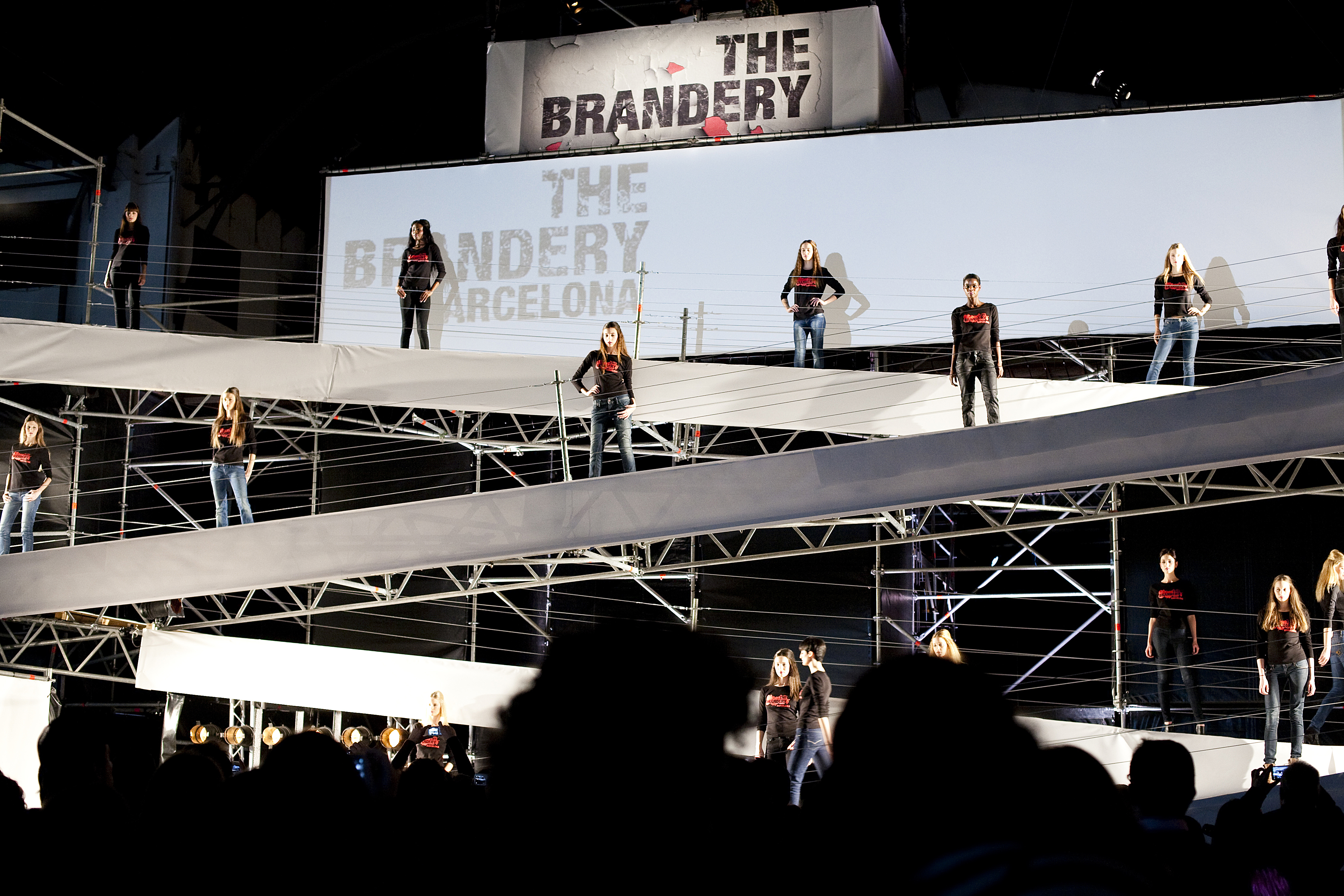
Cat walk at The Brandery

=== Romania ===
- Feeric Fashion Week

=== Serbia ===
- Belgrade Fashion Week
- Elite Model Look Serbia
- Belgrade Design Week
- Serbia Fashion Week

=== Spain ===
- Madrid Fashion Week
- The Brandery

=== Sweden ===
- Stockholm Fashion Week (STHLMFW)

=== United Kingdom ===
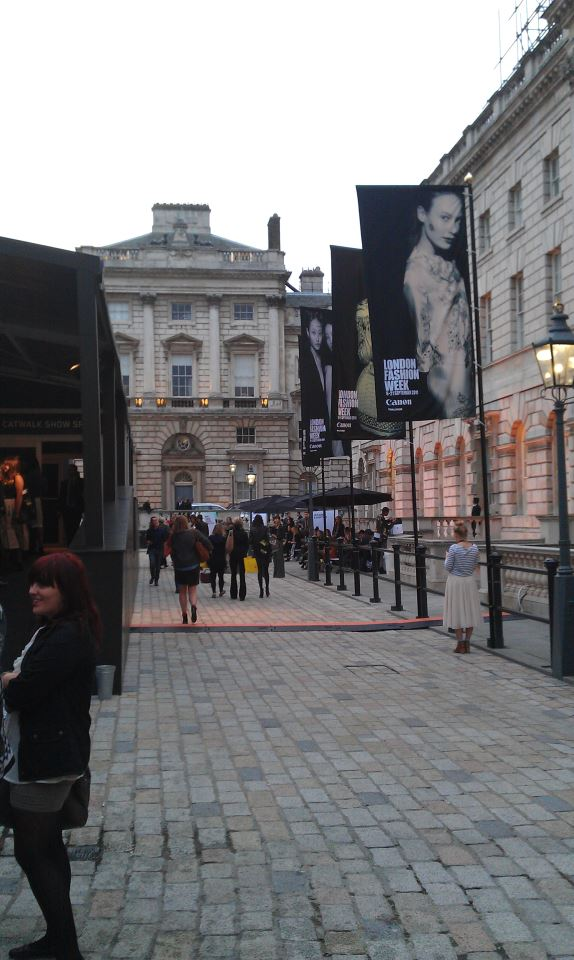
London Fashion Week at Somerset House

- Africa Fashion Week London
- Clothes Show Live
- Fashion in Film Festival
- London Fashion Week (capital)
  - Fall 2008 fashion weeks
  - Fall 2023 fashion weeks
  - Men's Fashion Week
- Manchester Fashion Week
- Oxford Fashion Week
- Pure London
- Sunrise in Baku Fashion Project

=== Ukraine ===
- Ukrainian Fashion Week

== Oceania ==
=== Australia ===
- Australian Fashion Week
- Melbourne Fashion Festival
- Mercedes-Benz Fashion Festival Brisbane

=== Fiji ===
- Fiji Fashion Week

=== New Zealand ===
- New Zealand Fashion Week / Auckland
- New Zealand Fashion Week / Christchurch Fashion Festival
- iD Dunedin Fashion Week

== See also ==
- Fashion week
- List of fashion designers
