= Fall 2023 fashion weeks =

Fashion events held in 2023

Major fall 2023 fashion weeks were held in New York City, London, Paris, and Milan during January, February, and March 2023.

== Paris Fashion Week ==
The Fall/Winter 2023 Paris Fashion Week was held between February 27 and March 7, 2023. Additionally, Paris held two other fashion exhibitions in January. January 17–22 was an exhibition dedicated to men's fashion, and January 23–26 was dedicated to Spring/Summer 2023 haute couture.

=== Fall/Winter 2023 Men's Designers ===
==== Tuesday 1/17 ====
Kidill	Wales Bonner	Valette Studio	Egonlab
Iregular	Études	Saint Laurent	

==== Wednesday 1/18 ====
Berluti	Bianca Saunders	Solid Homme	Acne Studios
Lemaire	Bluemarble	Hed Mayner	Fursac
Givenchy	Liberal Youth Ministry	Feng Cheng Wang	Walter Van Beirendonck
Auralee	George Wendell	Jeanne Friot	Louis-Gabriel Nouchi
Y/Project			

==== Thursday 1/19 ====
Rains	Uniforme	Issey Miyake	Facetasm
Rick Owens	Sean Suen	Isabel Marant	Airei
Sulvam	Amiri	Louis Vuitton	Yohji Yamamoto
Dries Van Noten	Ami - Alexandre Mattiusi	Objects IV Life	

==== Friday 1/20 ====
Junya Watanabe MAN	Courréges	Ungaro	Lukhanyo Mdingi
Paul Smith	Juun.J	Maison Mhara Yasuhiro	Dior Homme
Botter	Comme Des Garçons Homme Plus	Songzio	Steven Passaro
Officine Générale	Vuarnet	Kenzo	Members of the Rage
Chaz A. Jordan			

==== Saturday 1/21 ====
Undercover	Namesake	Sankuanz	Lowe
Ziggy Chen	Kolor	Hermés	White Mountaineering
Henrik Vibskov	Casablanca	Bode	Mr Saturday
Marine Serre	Kidsuper		

==== Sunday 1/22 ====
Ludovic De Saint Serin	Doublet	Wooyoungmi	Winnie
Sacai	Namacheko	Arturo Obegero	Kiko Kostandinov
Pigalle Paris	Lazoshmidl	Taakk	Maison Margiela
Doni Nahmias	System Studios		

==== Online ====
Tom Ford

=== Spring/Summer 2023 Haute Couture Designers ===
==== Monday 1/23 ====
Schiaparelli	Lùchen	Iris Van Herpen	Giambattista Valli
Christian Dior	Rahul Mishra	Maison Rabih Kayrouz	

==== Tuesday 1/24 ====
Chanel	Alexis Mabille	Stéphanie Roland	Julien Fournie
Alexandre Vauthier	RVDK Ronald Van Der Kemp	Armani Privé	

==== Wednesday 1/25 ====
Yuima Nakazato	Franck Sorbier	Elie Saab	Julie De Libran
Viktor & Rolf	Zuhair Murad	Jean Paul Gaultier	Valentino
Miss Sohee			

==== Thursday 1/26 ====
Aelis	Imane Ayissi	Juana Martin	Fendi Couture
Gaurav Gupta	Maison Sara Chraibi	Robert Wun	

=== Fall/Winter 2023 Fashion Week Designers ===
==== Monday 2/27 ====
Weisanto	Niccolo Pasqualetti	Rui	Benjamin Benmoyal
Vaquera			

==== Tuesday 2/28 ====
CFCL	Maitrepierre	Victoria/Tomas	Mame Kuroguchi
Heliot Emil	Christian Dior	Boutet Solanes	Dawei
Anne Isabella	Anrealage	Pressiat	Yves Saint Laurent

==== Wednesday 3/1 ====
Courrèges	Rosin Pierce	Litkovska	Nehera
The Row	Undercover	Dries Van Noten	Meryll Rogge
Cecilie Bahnsen	Balmain	Paco Rabanne	Acne Studios

==== Thursday 3/2 ====
Shang Xia	Alexis Mabille	Véronique Leroy	Off-White
Gauchere	Chloé	Givenchy	Uma Wang
Ruohan	Rick Owens	Boyarovskaya	Schiaparelli
Isabel Marant			

==== Friday 3/3 ====
Leonard Paris	Alexandre Vauthier	Christian Wijnants	Didu
LOEWE	Lutz Huelle	Issey Miyake	Jitrois
Giambattista Valli	Andrew Gn	Nina Ricci	Kiko Kostadinov
Victoria Beckham	Yohji Yamamoto	Coperni	

==== Saturday 3/4 ====
Junya Watanabe	Ester Manas	Situationist x Yaspis	Noir Kei Ninomiya
Vivienne Westwood	Hermès	Chen Peng	Rochas
Elie Saab	Comme Des Garçons	Enfants Riches Déprimés	Alexander McQueen
Ann Demeulemeester			

==== Sunday 3/5 ====
Lanvin	Margaret Howell	Dice Kayek	Barbara Bui
Balenciaga	Ottolinger	Akris	Beautiful People
Palm Angels	Atlein	Florentina Leitner	Pierre Cardin
Valentino	A.P.C.		

==== Monday 3/6 ====
Paul Smith	Stella McCartney	Paula Canovas Del Vas	Ungaro
AZ Factory	Zimmermann	Schiatzy Chen	Louis Vuitton
Sacai	Calvin Luo	Rokh	Germanier
GmbH	Dundas		

==== Tuesday 3/7 ====
Mossi	Chanel	Miu Miu	Ujoh
Y/Project	Avellano	Xuly Bët	A.W.A.K.E. Mode
The Selects - Paris Showroom including: ERL; Nanushka			

=== Key Trends ===
==== Men's Designers ====
The fall/winter 2023 men's runway continued a trend of plaid and checkered menswear that had previously been seen in spring/summer 2023. Faux fur, earth tones, and animal prints, were very popular. Designers also tapped into futurist and surrealist sensibilities. Jumpsuits made a comeback as did sleek, understated luxury. Suits were designed for office wear, though many of these suits were queered with rumpled styling that implied late night sexual escapades, and bright colors (such as purple).

==== Haute Couture ====
Surrealist looks were popular at SS23 haute couture week, particularly in Schiaparelli's controversial dresses containing hyper realistic foam animal heads and in Valentino's maximalist formalwear. Metallics, sheer fabrics, and harlequin prints were also popular.

==== Fashion Week ====
The fall/winter 2023 fashion week shows saw the return of 80s-inspired silhouettes, including shoulder-padded blazers and hourglass suiting. Wraps and flowy layers that produced a cocoon-like appearance were also common on the runway. Surrealist looks were popular, including clothes that appeared to have holes punched out of them, and oversized, brightly colored pussy bows. Ultra-tactile materials, such as faux fur coats and distressed knitwear, were seen on the runway. Popular accessories for women included hosiery and thin ties. Red was the most prominent pop color. Following the fall/winter 2023 shows, Women's Wear Daily noted that men's skirts seemed to be absent from the showrooms, despite their presence on the runways. Industry leaders noted that street brands had been expressing resistance to adopting men's skirts in retail stores for some time.

== New York Fashion Week ==
The Fall/Winter 2023 New York Fashion Week was held between February 10 and February 15, 2023. The affiliated New York Men's Day took place on February 10, 2023.

=== Fall/Winter 2023 New York Men's Designers ===
==== Friday 2/10 ====
A. Potts	all beneath heaven	Atelier Cillian	Bulan
Dionysus	Jahnkoy	Kent Anthony	Nicholas Raefski
nobis	Raleigh Workshop	Terry Singh	Amirok
Fried Rice	Holo Market	Nicholas Raefski	SO.TY
Teddy Vonranson	Todd Patrick		

=== Fall/Winter 2023 New York Fashion Week Designers ===
==== Wednesday 2/8 ====
- Shame

==== Friday 2/10 ====
Rodarte	Judy Turner	Collina Strada	Simkhai
Prabal Gurung	Dion Lee		

==== Saturday 2/11 ====
Snow Xue Gao	PH5	Sandy Liang	Proenza Schouler
Sukeina	Area	Patbo	Herve Leger
Alice + Olivia	Anna Sui	Sergio Hudson	Eckhaus Latta
Sam Finger	UTOPIA	Heron Preston	

==== Sunday 2/12 ====
Ulla Johnson	Studio 189	Puppets & Puppets	Melke
Jason Wu Collection	Adeam	Dur Doux	Alejandra Alonso Rojas
Private Policy	Khaite	A-Company	Vivienne Tam
Kim Shui			

==== Monday 2/13 ====
Andrew Kwon	Carolina Herrera	Palomo Spain	Zankov
Ankvas	Dennis Basso	Coach	Bibhu Mohapatra
Foo and Foo	Batsheva	Cucculelli Shaheen	Priscavera
Tory Burch	Elena Velez	LaQuan Smith	

==== Tuesday 2/14 ====
Brandon Maxwell	Naeem Khan	Gabriela Hearst	Colin Locascio
Koltson	Bach Mai	Loveshackfancy	Pamella Roland
Hellessy	Thom Browne	Veronica Beard	Head of State
Altuzarra	Christian Cowan	NOID	Creature World
Kallmeyer	Ayama Studio		

==== Wednesday 2/15 ====
Chocheng	Michael Kors	House of Aama	Kevan Hall
Wiederhoeft	Badgley Mischka	Markarian	Who Decides War
Frederick Anderson	Willy Chavarria	The Blonds	Luar
Nayon			

== Madrid Fashion Week ==
The Fall/Winter 2023 Madrid Fashion Week (also called Mercedes-Benz Fashion Week Madrid) was held between February 15 and February 19, 2023.

=== Fall/Winter 2023 Madrid Fashion Week Designers ===
==== 2/15 ====
María Lafuente	Viriato	Ángel Schlesser	Rafael Urquizar
Pertegaz	Pilar Dalbat	Félix Ramiro	Eduardo Navarrete

==== 2/16 ====
Ágatha Ruiz de la Prada	Andrés Sardá	Jorge Vázquez	Pedro del Hierro
Pablo Erroz	Encinar	Paloma Suárez	

==== 2/17 ====
Otrura	Isabel Sanchís	Hannibal Laguna	Roberto Torretta
Duarte	Teresa Helbig		

==== 2/18 ====
Odette Álvarez	García Madrid	Fely Campo	Maya Hansen
Custo Barcelona	Claro Couture		

==== 2/19 ====
Reparto	Adrià Egea	Guillermo Décimo	Fátima Miñana
93 Sierra/Crosses	Sabela Juncal	Charlie Smits	Alejandre
Aitogoikoetxea	Lorena Savaria		

== London Fashion Week ==
The Fall/Winter 2023 London Fashion Week was held between February 17 and February 21, 2023.

=== Fall/Winter 2023 London Fashion Week Designers ===
==== 2/17 ====
Paul Costelloe	Sinead O'Dwyer	Noon by Noor	Bora Aksu
Fashion East	Untitlab	Di Petsa	Edward Crutchley
Completed Works	Huishan Zhang	Ancuta Sarca	KWKW by Kay Kwok
Sinead Gorey	Mark Fast	London College of Fashion	Piferi
Conner Ives	Dilara Findikoglu	On/Off	

==== 2/18 ====
Masha Popova	Toga	Eudon Choi	16Arlington
Ray Chu	Chet Lo	Molly Goddard	Hai
David Koma	Roker	Ahluwalia	Scott Henshall
Halpern	Nensi Dojaka	Robyn Lynch	Richard Quinn
Ingrid Kraftchenko			

==== 2/19 ====
Paolo Carzana	Emilia Wickstead	Jakke	Febe
Tove	1x1 Studio	Roksanda	Christopher Kane
Helen Kirkum	Simone Rocha	S.S. Daley	Erdem
Yuhan Wang	Labrum London	Julien Macdonald	

==== 2/20 ====
Asai	Yuzefi	J E Cai	Harri
Carlotte Barrera	Edeline Lee	Pronounce	SJoon
Susan Fang	Tata Naka	Saul Nash	Paul & Joe
Rixo	Burberry	Central Saint Martins	

==== 2/21 ====
Frolov	Kseniaschnaider	Pascal	Chau Rising
Buerlangma	IA London	Jens Laugesen	

== See also ==
Fall 2008 fashion weeks
