= Natharlea Yahampath =

Sri Lankan fashion designer

Natharlea Yahampath is a Sri Lankan fashion designer. She is predominantly known for her wide collection of handmade knitwear. She currently works as a co-creative director of LOVI.

== Career ==
She pursued her Doctor of Philosophy in the field of Design and Engineering. She also obtained a degree at the Academy Of Design specializing in Fashion Design and Textiles.

During her career, she has made rapid strides with a portfolio of fashion oriented shows under her helm including Krakow Fashion Week, Mercedes Benz Fashion Week Sri Lanka. In 2024, she was subsequently appointed to the position of co-creative director of LOVI. Her collection titled Day Dream by Natharlea, was loosely inspired from one of the takeaways of her own life trajectory of daydreams stemming from a garden teeming with dragonflies and flowers.

In 2024, she took part in the 21st edition of the Colombo Fashion Week which was held at the Cinnamon Grand and co-designed the collection titled Bloom by LOVI Ceylon along with Asanka de Mel which was displayed for the Colombo Fashion Week to highlight the diversity and identity of Sri Lankan culture.

She collaborated with British entrepreneur Anila Preston in order to set up a line of high-end clothing induced design portfolio being precisely made using the alpaca wool in London. Both Natharlea and Anila displayed their collection of contemporary fashion design at a sustainability fair held at The Conduit Club in Covent Garden, London. Her out-of-the box thinking paradigm shift approach opened floodgates for the possibilities of upcoming Sri Lankan artisans to prove their mettle as a platform venturing into the knitwear industry at the international level. Although hand-knitting has not been widely recognized as a traditional Sri Lankan craft, Natharlea's efforts brought a widespread attention on Sri Lanka's potential to enter the global knitwear industry.
