= African Fashion Week Houston =

Fashion event held in Houston, Texas, US

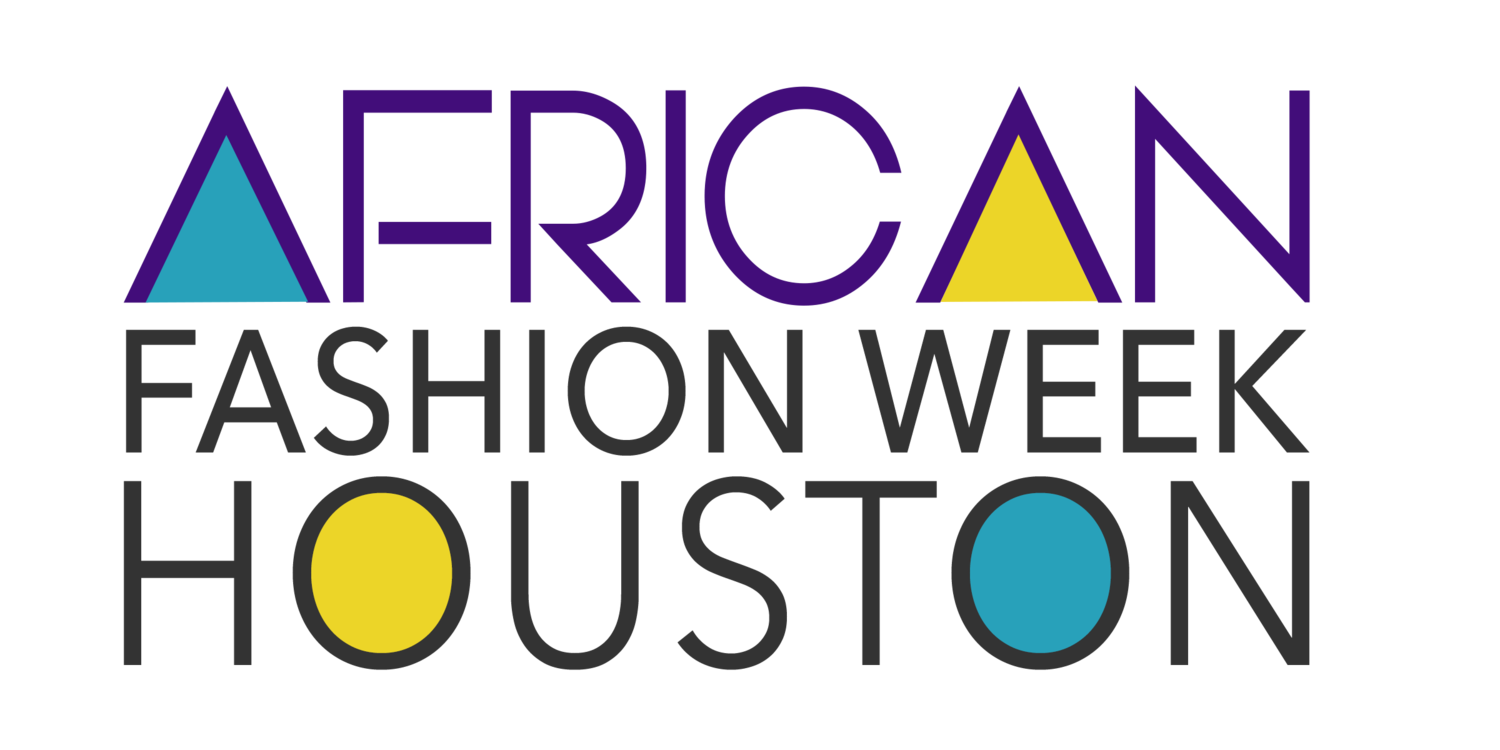
- Status: Inactive
- Genre: Fashion
- Frequency: Annual
- Locations: Houston, Texas
- Country: United States
- Established: 2014
- Founders: Nkem Oji-Alala
- Most recent: 2021
- Website: www.afwhouston.com

African Fashion Week Houston (AFWH) is an annual international fashion week, held in Houston, Texas, that highlights African culture in a series of fashion shows, events, educational seminars, and workshops. The event features collections that reflect the traditions of Africa and the diaspora.

== History ==
Started in 2014 by Nkem Oji-Alala, the event has ranged between two and three days. In 2018, Olakanye Modupe, winner of the Nigerian Student Fashion and Design Week presented her collection at the event. In 2016 the event helped raise money for St. Jude Children's Research Hospital, and included designs from students at the Art Institute of Houston. The most recent event took place in 2021.

== See also ==
- List of fashion events
- List of fashion events in the United States
