= Texas Fashion Collection =

Non-profit organization

Coordinates: 33.2112°N 97.1441°W

- Formation: 1938
- Headquarters: University of North Texas College of Visual Arts & Design, Denton, Texas, United States
- Website: https://tfc.cvad.unt.edu/

The Texas Fashion Collection is a non-profit organization dedicated to the preservation and documentation of historically significant fashion. It is operated by the University of North Texas through the College of Visual Arts and Design (CVAD) and housed on the UNT campus in Denton, Texas. The collection is an educational resource for students, researchers and the general public.

== History ==
The origins of the Texas Fashion Collection began in 1938 when Stanley and Edward Marcus preserved examples of top designers' works in honor of Carrie Marcus Neiman, co-founder of Neiman Marcus and arbiter of taste for the store. In the 1960s following a fire at the flagship Neiman-Marcus location, nearly 200 pieces of apparel from this collection were added to the Dallas Museum of Fashion, a grassroots initiative created and maintained by the Dallas Fashion Group in the Dallas Apparel Mart . When space at the Dallas Apparel Mart was at a premium and responding to the UNT Center for Design Research and new UNT fashion design program, the Dallas Museum of Fashion gifted its holdings to the University of North Texas in 1972, and in the 1980s this cache was renamed the Texas Fashion Collection.

The TFC's facilities have varied and professionalized over time. Initially, these holdings were housed in ad hoc classroom spaces across campus. In 1993, UNT renovated Scoular Hall to consolidate the rare clothing objects into 3700 square foot climate-controlled space, which made it possible to inventory the collection as a whole for the first time. To support of this vital component of fashion history, a National Endowment for the Arts grant for history and documentation was awarded to the Collection in 1995. In 2013, with the demolition of Scoular Hall, the Texas Fashion Collection and the other programs housed in that building were relocated to a new temporary structure on campus, Welch Street Complex 1. In 2019, the TFC opened the Gloria and Bruzzy Westheimer Research Gallery, a 1300 square foot space on the second floor of the UNT Art Building.

TFC leadership has been driven by fashion and higher education leadership. Its earliest caretakers were Stanley and Edward Marcus, along with Carrie Marcus Neiman. A cohort of fashion industry professionals maintained and grew the collection through the Dallas Museum of Fashion, and Edward and Betty Mattil facilitated its donation to the University of North Texas. UNT Fashion Design Professor Myra Walker served as the TFC director and curator from 1987-2017, and during her tenure the collection doubled in size and grew in stature. In fall 2016, current TFC director Annette Becker was hired.

Since 2010, the Texas Fashion Collection has partnered with the UNT Libraries to create a digital catalog of the holdings of the collection. Accessible through the UNT Libraries' Digital Library, an increasing number of objects can be viewed via the internet.

Though the TFC does not have its own dedicated exhibition space, it regularly partners with cultural institutions to make its holdings accessible. Previous exhibition partners include:

- Dallas Museum of Art, Dallas, Texas
- Meadows Museum, Southern Methodist University, Dallas, Texas
- Crow Museum of Asian Art, Dallas, Texas
- Bullock Texas State History Museum, Austin, Texas
- McNay Art Museum, San Antonio, Texas
- Goss-Michael Foundation, Dallas, Texas
- NorthPark Center, Dallas, Texas
- Salve Regina University Gallery, Newport, Rhode Island

== Collections ==
Early in its history, the Dallas Fashion Group was successful in generating donations of designer clothing from Dallas women. Under the direction of UNT since 1972, the collection has grown from 3,000 to more than 18,000 historic items. Designs from Cristóbal Balenciaga (340, believed to be the second largest inventory of original Balenciaga dresses after the house's own archives), Hubert de Givenchy (387), Oscar de la Renta (301), Christian Dior (151) Todd Oldham, Hanae Mori, James Galanos, and Norman Norell make up robust portions of the collection, with the majority of the TFC's holdings representing Dallas-Fort Worth metroplex consumers' engagement with high style from the 1930s-1990s.

Heard de Osborne donated most the Balenciaga prestigious dresses (she had pre-access to new collections), and Mercedes Bass donated most of the de la Renta prestigious dresses.

The famed 1965 Emilio Pucci designed Gemini IV Hostess uniform Collection for Braniff International Airways is also housed in the Texas Fashion Collection. The Braniff Pucci Collection was donated to the museum in March 1969, and included several dresses owned by Braniff co-founder Thomas Elmer Braniff's wife Bess Braniff.

1,150 dresses are tagged "designer unknown".

== Fashion on Main ==
Fashion on Main was the exhibition facility of the Texas Fashion Collection. It was located in the historic Titche-Goettinger Building in the Main Street District of downtown Dallas. Opened in 2006, it was renovated in 2013 and incorporated into the Galleries of the College of Visual Arts and Design of UNT. As of 2018, the space has been returned to the UNT System and no longer functions as a gallery.

== See also ==
- Houston fashion week
- Austin Fashion Week
