= Colorado Fashion Week =

American annual fashion event from 2011 to 2015

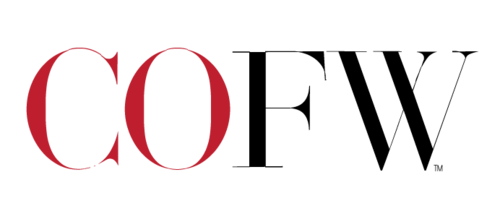
- Status: Inactive
- Genre: Fashion
- Frequency: Annual
- Location: Colorado
- Years active: 2011-2015
- Inaugurated: 2011
- Founders: Justice Kwesi Kwarteng
- Most recent: 2015

Colorado Fashion Week, (COFW) was an annual fashion event in Colorado held between 2011 and 2015. The event was founded by Justice Kwesi Kwarteng and organized by the JTA Group, with the goal of placing Colorado in the global fashion business and featured local designers, salons and boutiques. Included were both public and private events ranging between 2 and 7 days.

== History ==
In 2010, Justice Kwesi Kwarteng did a show for the annual Red Ball. The following year he created Colorado Fashion Week, the event spanned five days at the Denver Performing Arts Complex. On September 17, 2012, then Colorado Governor John Hickenlooper signed a proclamation declaring October 1 - 7 2012 Colorado Fashion Week. After 2015, organizers shifted to a digital growth consultant business and no longer puts on fashion week events.
