= Kansas City Fashion Week =

Annual event

- Status: Active
- Genre: Fashion
- Frequency: Annual
- Locations: Kansas City, Kansas
- Country: United States
- Inaugurated: 2010
- Founders: Philip Willoughby, Teisha Barber
- Most recent: September, 2024
- Next event: March 8-16, 2025
- Website: kcfashionweek.com

Kansas City Fashion Week (KCFW), is an annual two-week fashion event that showcases emerging local designers as well as established designers. The event typically includes kick-off parties, in-store shopping and runway shows.

== History ==
The event began in 2010 and held its first full week of shows in spring 2012, Teisha Barber who had served as KSFW's executive director and later president, purchased ownership of the event for an undisclosed amount. In 2021, Kansas City Fashion Week won a partnership with the Council of Fashion Designers of America as part of CFDA Connects, one of fifteen fashion organizations in the program. The event's most recent season was September 2024, with the next show planned for March 8-16, 2025.

== See also ==
- List of fashion events
- List of fashion events in the United States
