= Aspen Fashion Week =

Former annual event

- Status: Inactive
- Frequency: Annual
- Locations: Aspen, Colorado
- Country: United States
- Years active: 2008-2014
- Inaugurated: 2008
- Founder: Lisa Johnson
- Most recent: 2014
- President: Brooke Fogg

Aspen Fashion Week (AFW), later Aspen International Fashion Week (AIFW), was a series of annual end-of-winter fashion week events held in Aspen, Colorado. The weeklong event included outdoor après-ski fashion shows, retail and boutique events and parties.

== History ==
The event was founded by Lisa Johnson in 2008. In 2011, tickets to the event cost $1,500. The 2012 event began with a stunt skydiver performance by a local Aspen extreme athlete.

== Rebrand ==
Weeks before the scheduled event in 2013, Aspen Fashion Week announced a cancellation. After a financial dispute and then lawsuit between organizers and local modeling agency Wilhelmina Denver, the show was taken over by the agency under the new name; Aspen International Fashion Week. The rebranded event was held from March 13 to 16, 2014. The event has not returned since.

== See also ==
- List of fashion events
- List of fashion events in the United States
