= Feeric Fashion Week =

Romanian fashion industry event

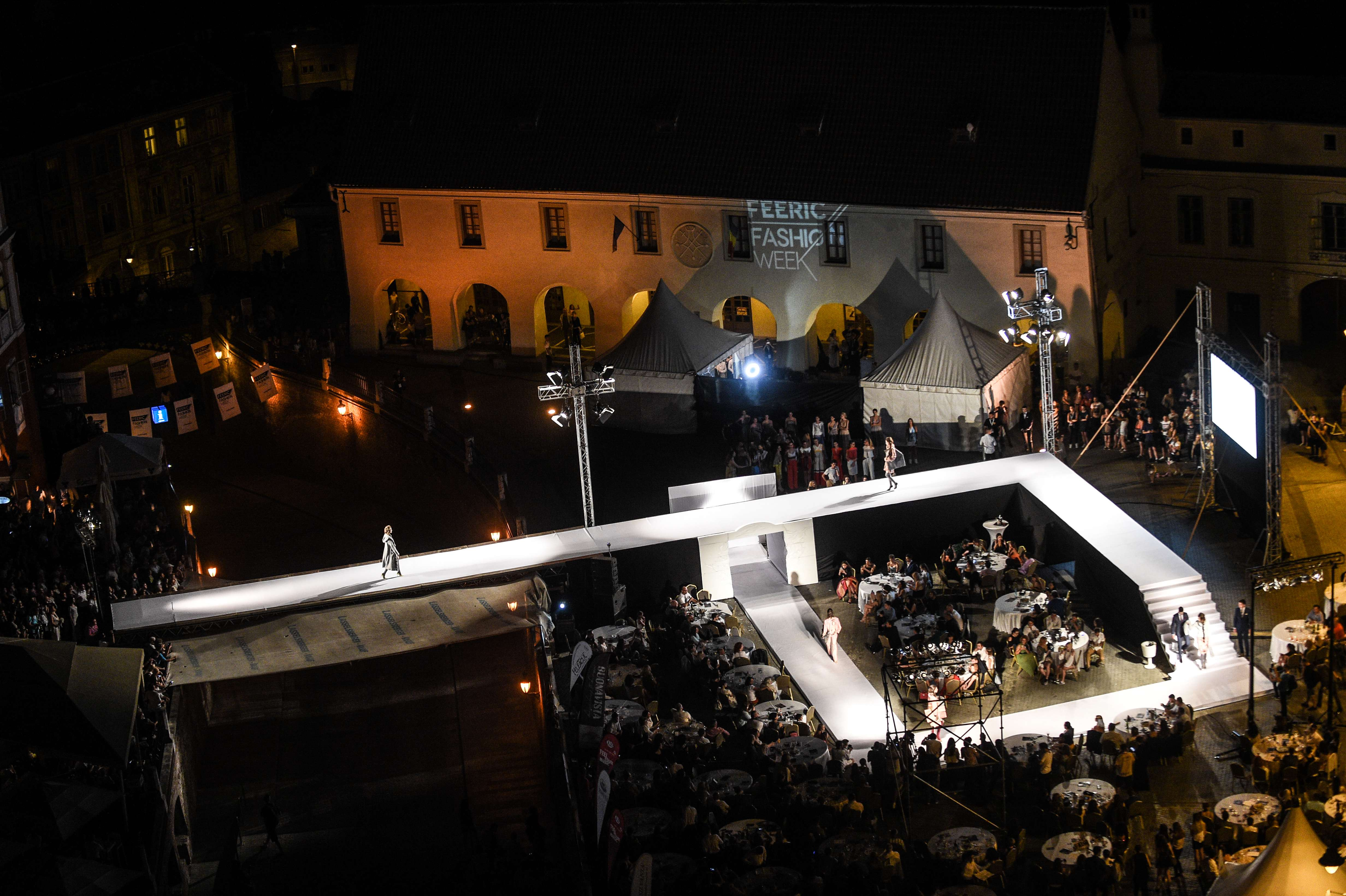
- Feeric Fashion Week closing gala takes place every year in The Small Square of Sibiu.
- Genre: Clothing and fashion exhibitions
- Date: 17 to 22 July 2018
- Frequency: Annual
- Location: Sibiu
- Country: Romania
- Inaugurated: 2008
- Founder: Mitichi Preda
- Attendance: Free
- Area: Sibiu and surroundings

Feeric Fashion Week is an international fashion event where designers from more than 20 countries and four continents showcase their work. Originating in 2008, it is based in Sibiu, Transylvania, Romania, and is covered by multiple fashion publications, including Vogue Italia, Schön Magazine, and Euronews. Vogue Italia described it as one of the most important Romanian fashion events. Vogue Italy commended Feeric Fashion Week's creativity of transforming the most peculiar places in catwalk-ready settings. Schön Magazine called Feeric Fashion Week the greatest fashion week in Eastern Europe.

The president of Feeric Fashion Week is Mitichi Preda. The event is supported by The City Hall of Sibiu.

== Origin ==
The first Feeric Fashion Week was created by the art director and fashion photographer Mitichi Preda and took place in 2008. Feeric is the Romanian word for "magic", and the name originates from the beauty of the Small Square – a square popular with both locals and tourists.

The first event was called "Feeric Fashion Show", a one-night outdoor event in the Small Square of Sibiu, created to attract attention to local fashion talent. The project was a success and developed into a bigger event. The second event was bigger, but still for one night; the same was true of the third event. Feeric then brought a runway built as a bridge over the road to Piata Mica.

The fourth event was renamed "Feeric Fashion Days" and held three days of events: fashion shows, exhibitions, conferences, workshops, and the different innovative places it started to outline itself as a very creative fashion project. The following year, 2012, Feeric became an international six-day event.

== Consolidation as "Feeric Fashion Week" ==
In 2016 the event became "Feeric Fashion Week", with nine days of fashion shows at places such as airports, railway depots, factories, castles, palaces, streets, rivers, and bridges. The actress Catrinel Marlon was the ambassador of the ninth event.

== Other notable events ==
=== Feeric Gala ===
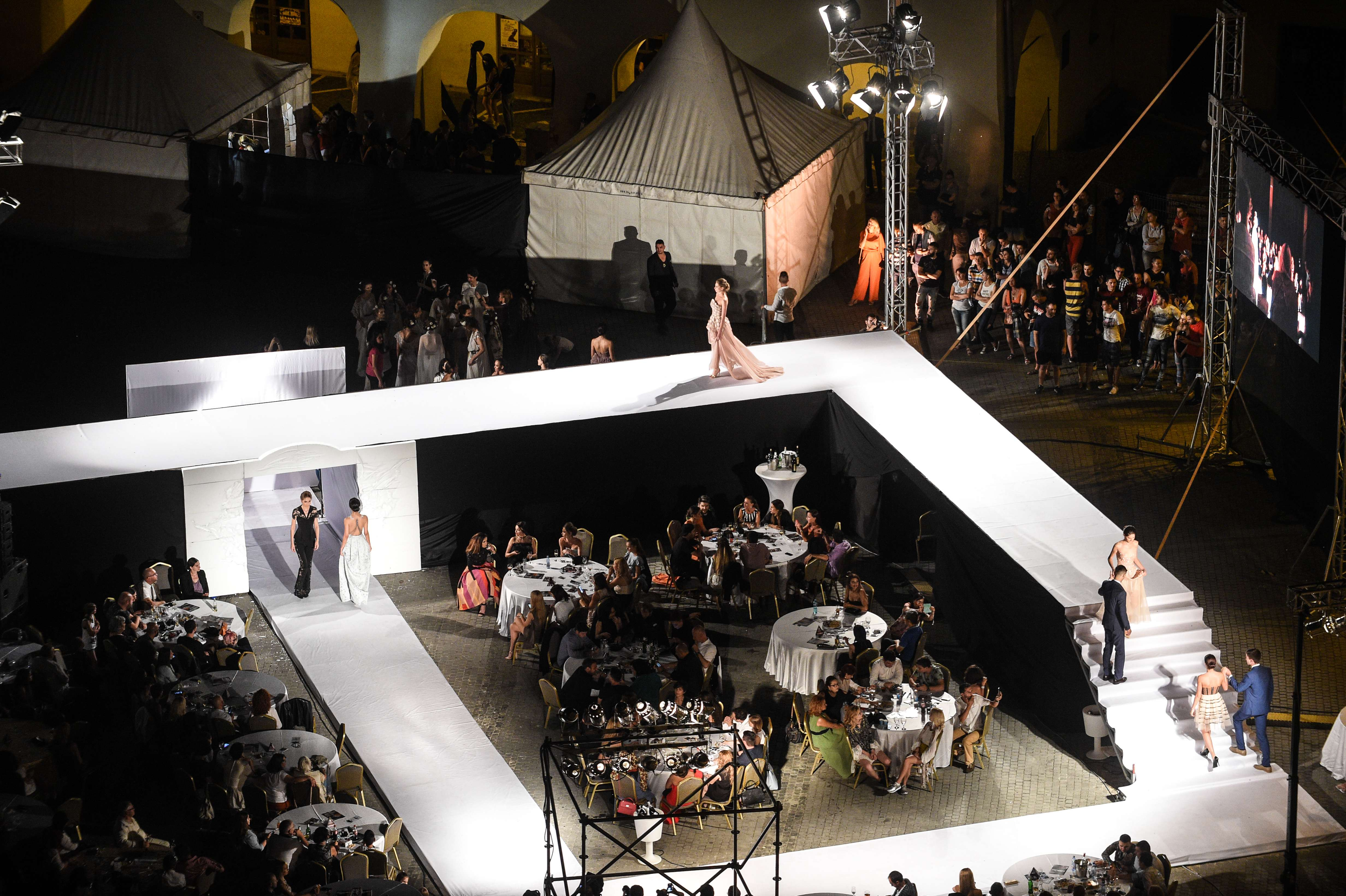
Moment in Feeric Gala

When the project began in 2008, there were three shows in the Small Square of Sibiu. Over time this event became the Feeric Gala, and is now the closing event of the week.

=== Individual Show ===
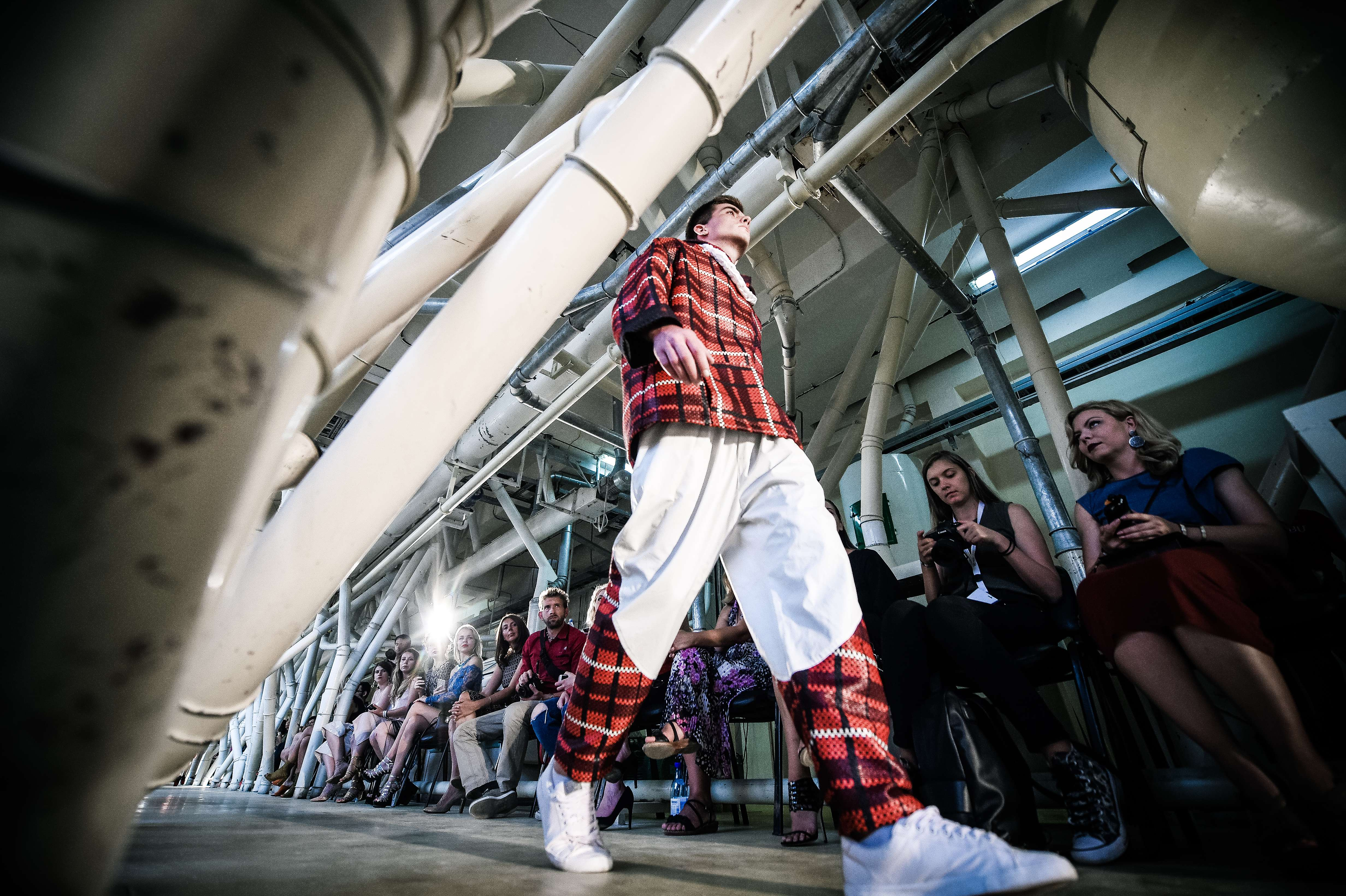
Individual fashion show in Boromir grain mill

The Individual Show concept began in 2011, during the fourth event, and has become a popular event. Vogue Italia stated that "One of the strengths of this fashion event is definitely its locations".

=== Feeric Venue Show ===
The Redal Expo offers 3000 square meters, which is the headquarters of Feeric Fashion Week.

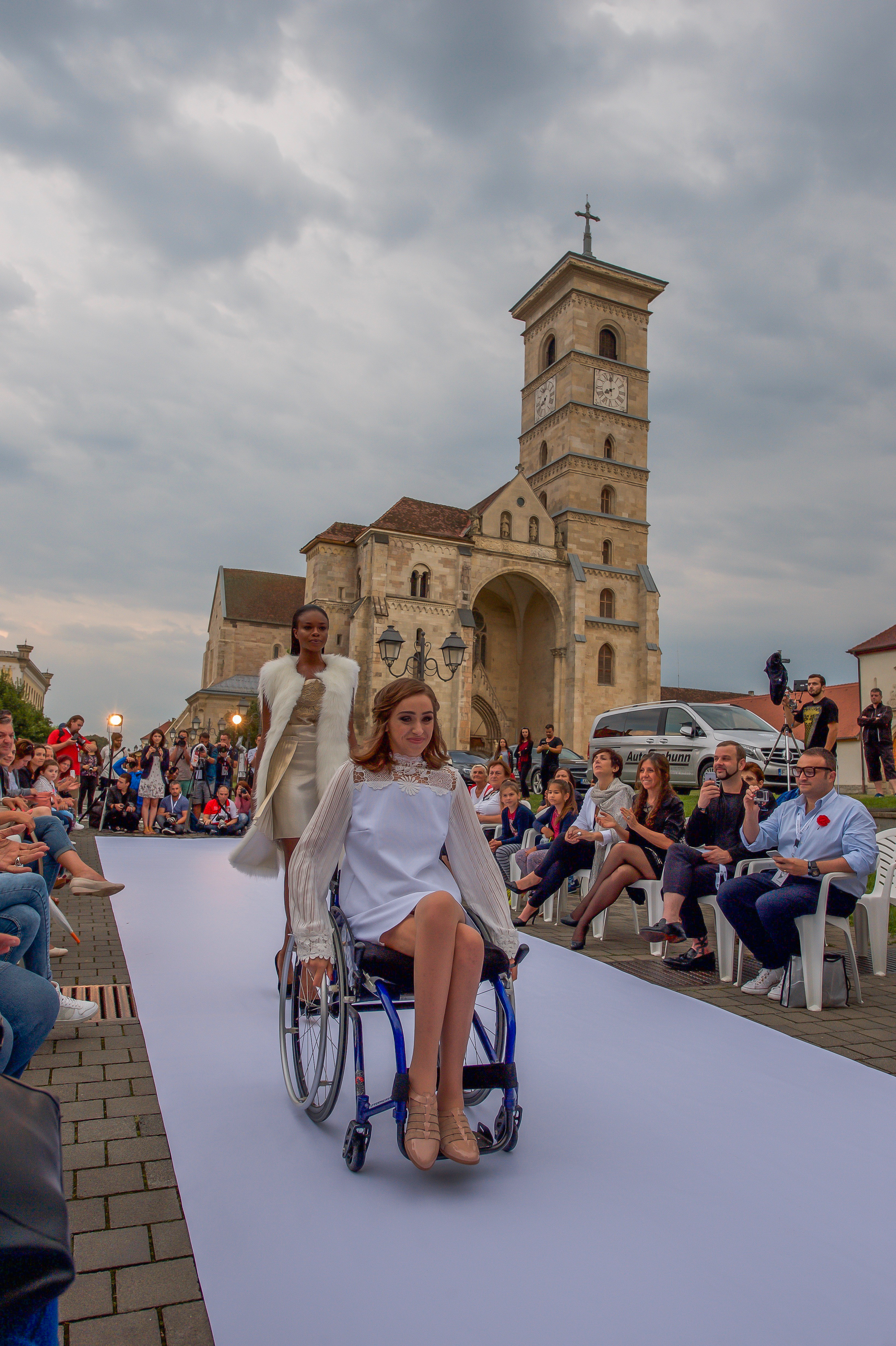
Wheelchair model from Atipic Beauty, in Feeric Fashion Week

=== Atipic Beauty ===
Feeric Fashion Week hosts independent projects and supports them to develop. One of the projects is Atipic Beauty, a show featuring models using wheelchairs. Schon Magazine wrote that "Inclusive fashion that ebbs away at the superficial demeanour of the industry can’t be a bad thing."

== Attendance ==
Admission to shows at Feeric Fashion Week is free to the public, but is standing room only. Accredited journalists and bloggers will have their seats, and photographers their place in their special area.

Front-row seats at specific events are available by invitation only.

== Partners ==
The main partner of the fashion week is The City Hall of Sibiu and international partners are Istituto Europeo di Design Fashion Channel and Mad Mood Milano

== Gallery ==
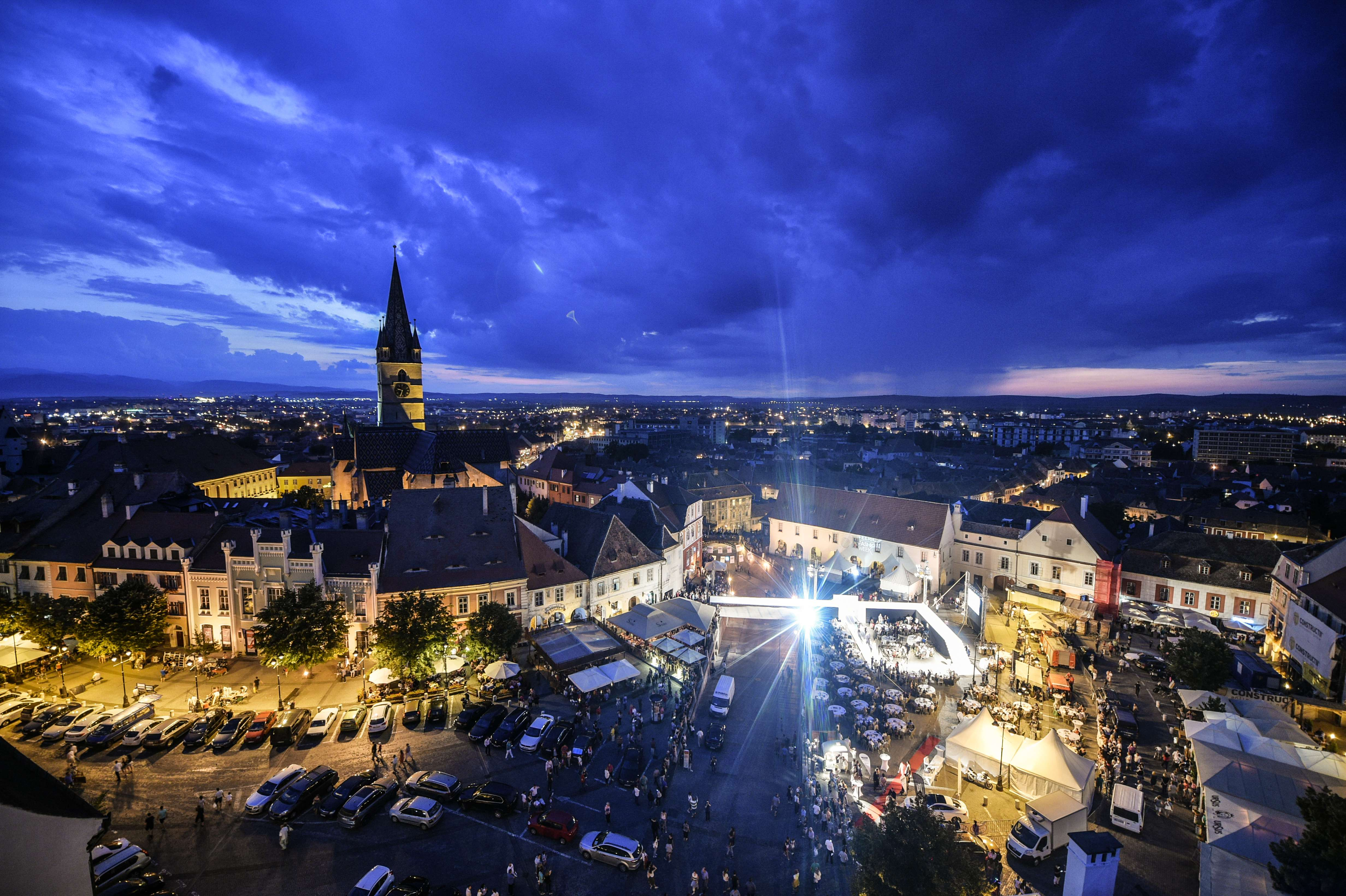
The Small Square of Sibiu, during Feeric Fashion Week closing gala - 2016.

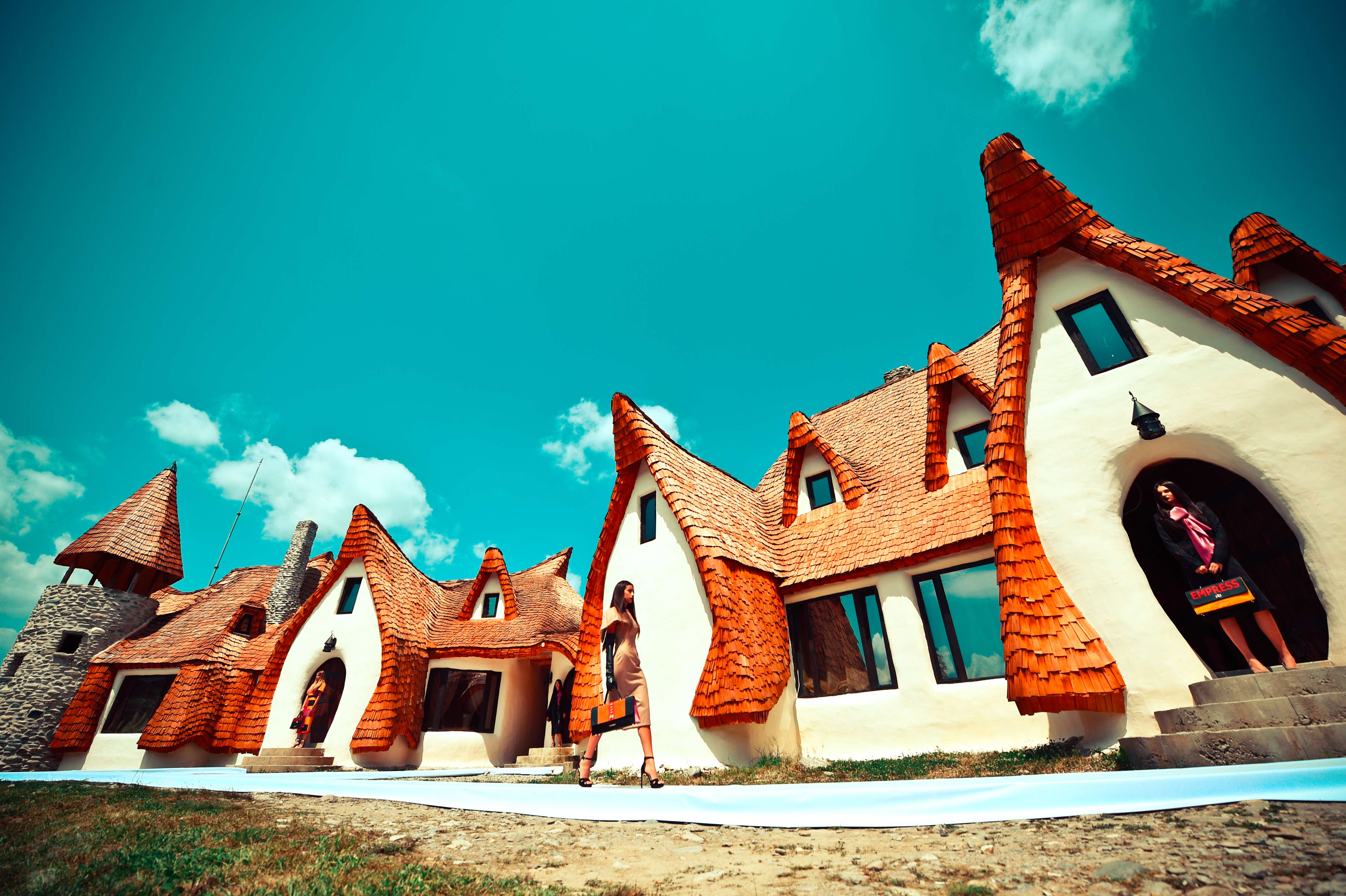
Charles and Ron fashion show

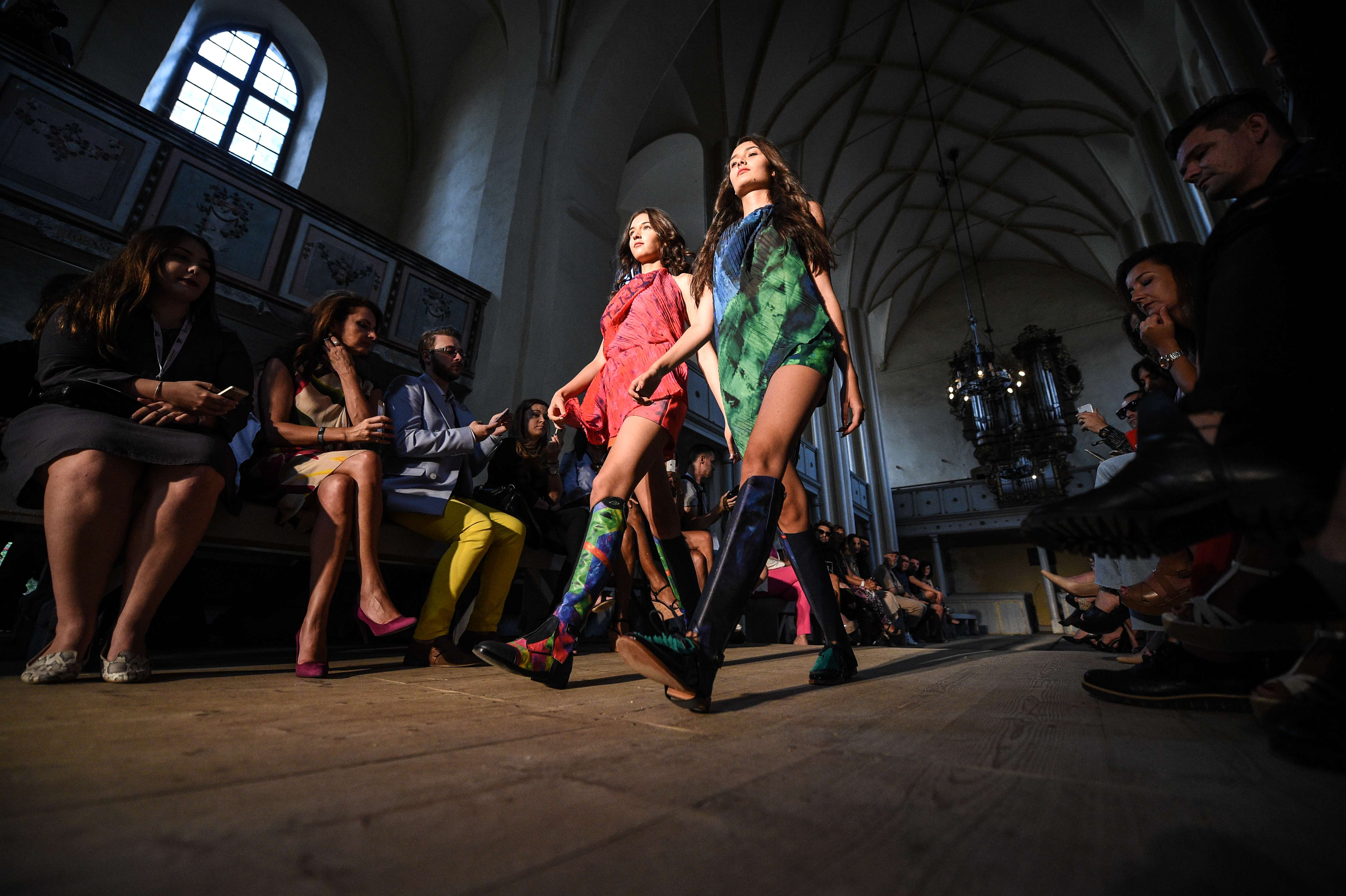
The Argentinian brand Sarah Jessy Jones showcase in Evangelic Church from Cristian, SIbiu

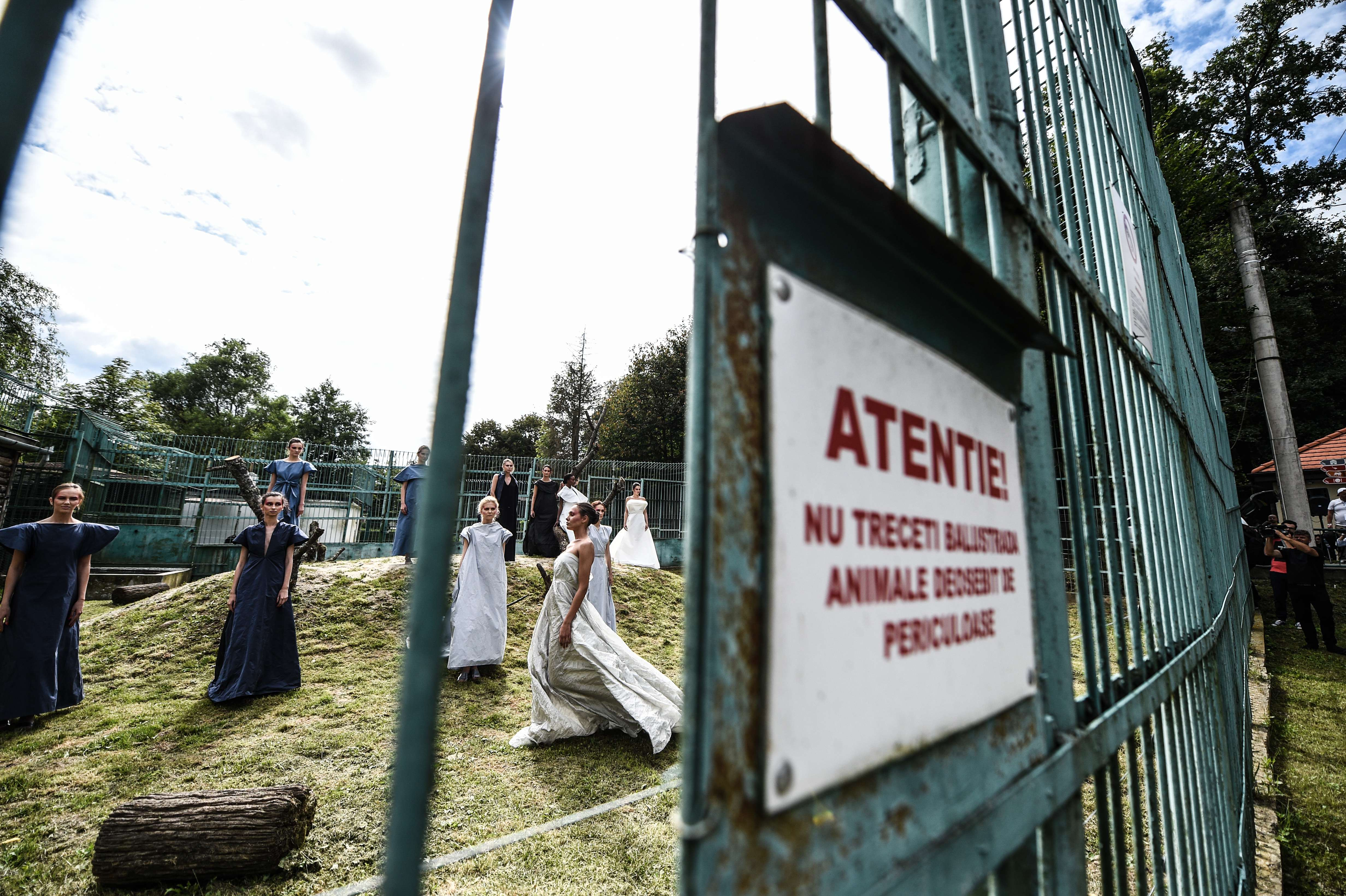
Bianca Popp fashion show inside lions cage at Sibiu Zoo

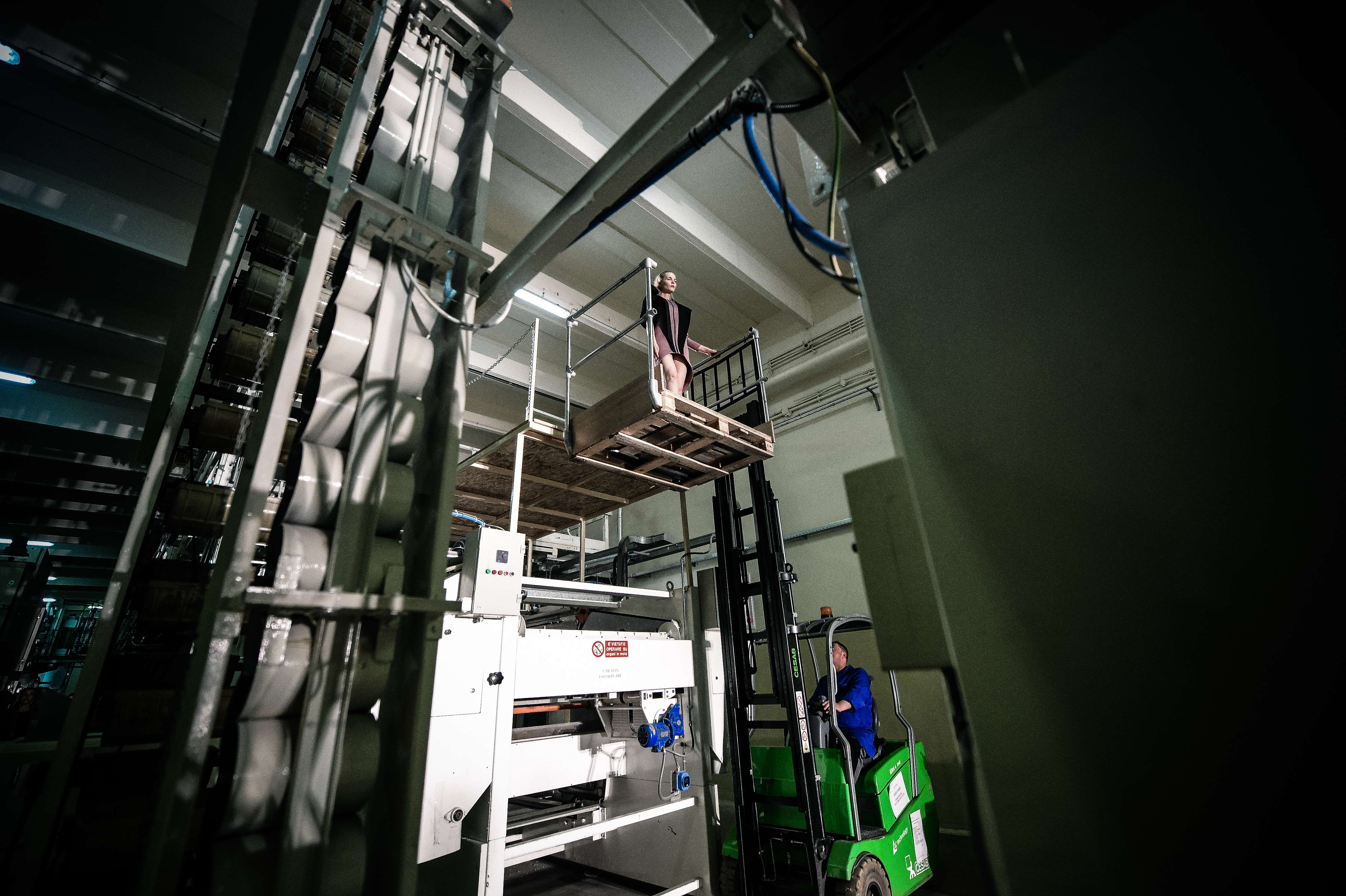
Fashion show inside in a pasta factory

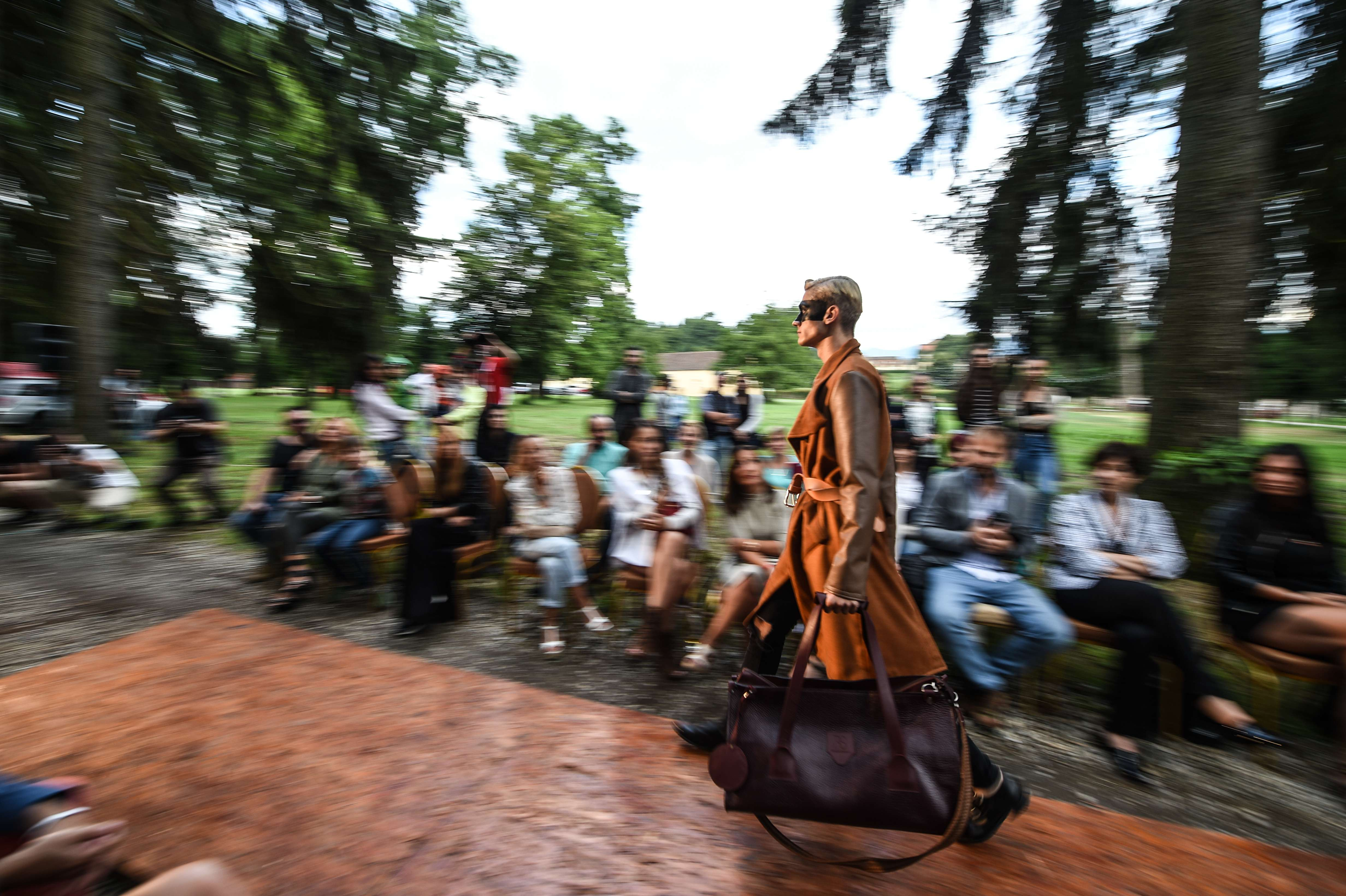
Model walking for Lavinia Ilies show

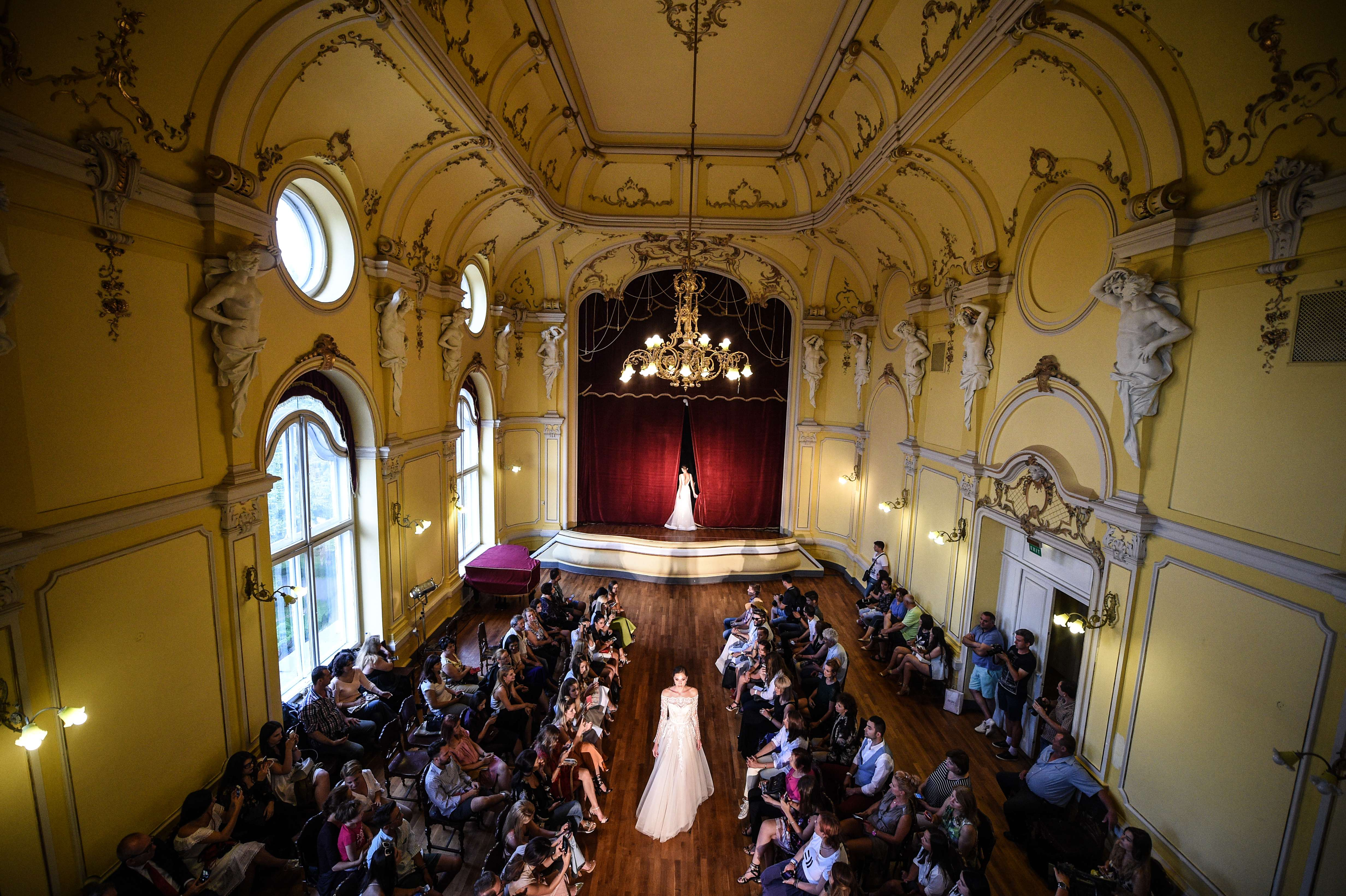
Bridal show of Natalia Vasiliev inside the events hall of Astra Library Sibiu

== See also ==
- Fashion week
- List of fashion events
