= Fashion Week Minnesota =

- Status: Active
- Genre: Fashion
- Inaugurated: 2015
- Most recent: 2024
- CEO: Sarah Edwards
- Website: www.fashionweekmn.com

Fashion Week Minnesota (FWMN), is a biannual fashion show event series and multimedia platform, hosted across the Twin cities, Minnesota. The event was founded in 2015 by Sarah Edwards and Jahna Peloquin. Its mission and focus is to highlight up and coming local talent, fashion, modeling, art, and culture, as well as tackling issues such as inclusivity, accessibility, agism, etc. Aside from the biannual main event, the organization also hosts smaller events, pop-ups, and workshops throughout the year. The series of fashion shows was most recently hosted in 2024

== See also ==
- List of fashion events
- List of fashion events in the United States
