= Indonesia Fashion Week =

Indonesian fashion industry event

- Genre: Fashion Shows and Fashion Exhibitions
- Frequency: Annually
- Location: Jakarta (primarily at JCC)
- Country: Indonesia
- Inaugurated: 2011
- Previous event: March 27 - March 31, 2024
- Next event: May 28 to June 1, 2025
- Website: indonesiafashionweek.id

Indonesia Fashion Week or IFW is the biggest fashion week in Indonesia that has been held annually since 2011 at the Jakarta Convention Center in Jakarta. The event is arranged by the Indonesian Fashion Entrepreneurs and Designers Association (APPMI), reflecting and promoting Indonesian culture in fashion. Fashion shows from different designers and fairs are arranged on the occasion.

== See also ==
- Fashion week
- List of fashion events
