= Fashion Week Cleveland =

Annual event (2002–2017)

- Status: Inactive
- Genre: Fashion
- Frequency: Annual
- Locations: Cleveland, Ohio
- Country: United States
- Established: 2002
- Founders: Donald Shingler
- Most recent: 2017

Fashion Week Cleveland was an annual fashion industry event held in Cleveland, Ohio which began in 2002 and ran 15 years until 2017. The event was founded to promote downtown development by Donald Shingler and was run in conjunction with the Cleveland Fashion Institute.

== History ==
The first edition was a private event organized by the cosmetic dentist Donald Shingler.

The event is the third-largest fashion show of its kind in the United States behind only New York Fashion Week and Los Angeles Fashion Week. As such, this event is recognized as the showcase for emerging American fashion designers. Designers such as MoMo Falana (designer for Sex and the City) and Wendy Pepper have been featured in past events.

In the midst of the subprime mortgage crisis, the 2010 edition was much lighter to adjust to the decrease in fashion spending. In 2014, Nichole Reed was named artistic director of the event. In 2017 after a 15 year run, the Fashion Week Cleveland series of shows was discontinued in favor of the new one-night event GlamJam Fashion & Music Festival.

A few Kent State University Fashion School students were also selected to display their creations.

== See also ==
- List of fashion events
- List of fashion events in the United States
