= Delray Beach Fashion Week =

Fashion week event

- Status: Active
- Genre: Fashion
- Frequency: Annually
- Locations: Delray Beach, Florida
- Years active: 2012-2022
- Inaugurated: 2012
- Most recent: 2022
- Executive Director: Laura Simon
- Organiser: Delray Beach Downtown Development Authority
- Website: downtowndelraybeach.com

Delray Beach Fashion Week, is fashion week event held annually in downtown Delray Beach by the local Delray Beach Downtown Development Authority. The event showcases creations by local designers. The event 5 day event has run since 2012, celebrating its tenth anniversary in 2022. The city-sponsored event typically includes runway shows, a trunk show and reflects the city's entertainment scene. The event has not been active since 2022.

== See also ==
- List of fashion events
- List of fashion events in the United States
