= Men's Fashion Week Los Angeles =

The Men's Fashion Week Los Angeles (MFWLA) was the bi-annual Los Angeles edition of the Men's Fashion Week. The first edition was planned to take place in 2013.

== History ==
The first edition of the Men's Fashion Week Los Angeles was planned to take place in 2013.

== Description ==
Los Angeles was the 5th city in the world to develop a Fashion Week for menswear, succeeding New York, London, Paris and Vancouver.

During the event, menswear fashion designers and retail brands presented their latest collections to industry insiders—press, media, bloggers, buyers, stylists, high-profile guests and fashion occult. Men's Fashion Week LA was planned twice a year: January (Autumn/Winter); and June (Spring/Summer). The one-week event was planned a few days preceding the traditional (women's) Los Angeles Fashion Week.

The event MFWLA consists of fashion week runway shows, trade show style exhibits and market week type custom pop-up showrooms. Additional amenities found at Men's Fashion Week LA are a “Gentry Suite”, “Cigar Lounge”, “Pop-Up Barber Shop”, “Gaming Suite” and a “Bow Tie Technique Suite”.

To reflect the original working-name, “Gentlemen’s Week”, a bow tie was linked to the company logo. The bow tie personifies MFWLA's company philosophy, which (as indicated by the company website) was founded on honor and civility among aesthete gentlemen.
