= Atlanta Fashion Week =

Annual event in Georgia, US

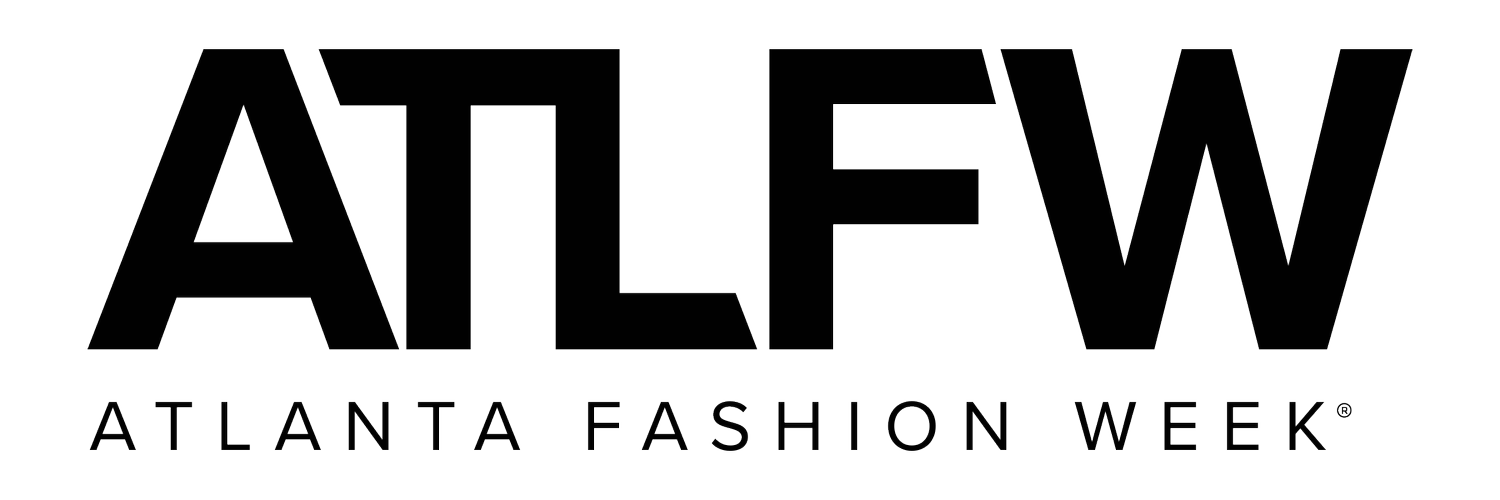
- Status: Active
- Genre: Fashion
- Frequency: Annual
- Locations: Atlanta, Georgia
- Country: United States
- Established: 2006
- Most recent: 2024
- Next event: October 2 - 7, 2024
- Organizer: RAGTRADE ATLANTA
- Website: www.atlantafashionweek.co

Atlanta Fashion Week (ATLFW) is an annual fashion week in Atlanta, Georgia founded by Angela Watts in 2006 and is supported by the mayor's office and Fulton County Arts and Culture as the "official" fashion week of Atlanta. The event includes fashion shows and presentations, pop-up shops, art installations, live DJ sets, industry expert talks, and designer meetups.

== History ==
Between 2006 and 2012, the founder hosted a collective of events that were deemed Atlanta Fashion Week. In 2013, RAGTRADE ATLANTA was formed and a full collective of events were held under the name; RAGTRADE Atlanta Fashion Week. In 2019 the event rebranded into Atlanta Fashion Week and RAGTRADE ATLANTA was rebranded into the official production company for Atlanta Fashion Week. RAGTRADE ATLANTA also announced the official support from the City of Atlanta Mayor's Office of Film and Entertainment as well as Invest Atlanta. At the press conference it was announced the four day event would take place August 5 – 9, 2020, but was delayed due to the COVID-19 pandemic. The event was held under Atlanta Fashion Week October 5–8, 2022. In 2023, the event partnered with Atlanta Hawks to create apparel for fans of the team.

== See also ==
- List of fashion events
- List of fashion events in the United States
