= Atlantic City Fashion Week =

Recurring fashion event in New Jersey

- Status: Active
- Genre: Fashion
- Frequency: Semiannual
- Locations: Atlantic City, New Jersey
- Country: United States
- Established: 2011
- Founders: Lamont Bowling, Jeana Bowling
- Most recent: 2023
- Website: www.atlanticcityfashionweek.com

Atlantic City Fashion Week (ACFW), is a semiannual fashion event held in both the spring and fall seasons.

The event features activities that include fashion shows, seminars, celebrity appearances, retail events, networking opportunities and industry parties. Atlantic City Fashion Week features designers, national retailers, boutiques and novice design students. Designers from England, Hungary, Russia, Australia, Haiti, Trinidad, Senegal, the Dominican Republic and all parts of the United States have showcased their collections at our runway event. Retailers have included Michael Kors, Tommy Bahama, OshKosh B'Gosh, Invicta, Brooks Brothers, Tiffany's and Abercrombie and Fitch. Atlantic City Fashion Week has also been a showcase for designers from the hit television series Project Runway. Those designers have included Dom Streater, Helen Castillo and Lantie Foster, as well as Philadelphia's men's designer LeGrand Leseur. Atlantic City Fashion Week has held its events at a variety of venues on the Atlantic City Boardwalk including "The Pier Shops at Caesars" (now "Playground Pier"), Bally's Atlantic City, and the Claridge Hotel.

== History ==
Atlantic City Fashion Week was Founded in 2011, by Lamont and Jeana Bowling, the founders of fashionSTYLE Magazine and KingBee Media LLC. In 2022 the event celebrated its 10th anniversary.

== See also ==
- List of fashion events
- List of fashion events in the United States
