= Chicago FashionBar Week =

Fashion event in Chicago, Illinois, US

- Status: Active
- Genre: Fashion
- Frequency: Annual
- Locations: Chicago, Illinois
- Country: United States
- Founders: Tony Long
- Most recent: 2023
- Organizer: FashionBar LLC
- Website: www.fashionbarchicago.com/the-shows/

Chicago FashionBar Week (CFW) is an annual fashion event in Chicago, Illinois, that showcases the city's fashion scene. The weeklong event is organized by FashionBar LLC under CEO Tony Long, a fashion business consulting firm. The event is typically divided into themed shows, highlighting different fashion categories, such as eco-friendly, ready-to-wear, and streetwear among others.

== History ==
In 2019 the event featured a modest fashion themed show for the first time. The most recent event took place in 2023, from April 22 to the 30 at the Water Tower Place.

== See also ==
- List of fashion events
- List of fashion events in the United States
