= Baltimore Fashion Week =

- Status: Active
- Genre: Fashion
- Frequency: Annual
- Locations: Baltimore, Maryland
- Country: United States
- Founded: 2008
- Founders: Sharan Nixon
- Most recent: 2024
- Next event: 2025

Baltimore Fashion Week (BFW) also called "the Shows at BFW", is an annual fashion event held in Baltimore, Maryland. The event was established in 2006. It hosted for the first time in 2008 featuring fashion shows, networking events, and virtual discussions.

The 15th BFW was held August 13–21, 2022. The most recent BFW took place during August 12–19, 2024. The next event will take place in 2025.

== See also ==
- List of fashion events
- List of fashion events in the United States
