= DC Fashion Week =

Fashion event in Washington D.C.

- Status: Active
- Genre: Fashion
- Frequency: Biannual
- Location: D.C.
- Country: United States
- Inaugurated: 2003
- Most recent: September 27 - 29 2024
- Website: dcfashionweek.org

DC Fashion Week is a biennial event in the District of Columbia, United States, held by fashion designers who convene to dress local models who have auditioned for the event. Besides the preview, DCFW consists of four shows, each focusing on a different fashion grouping. In 2018, the four shows were Eco Fashions and Next Generation Designers, the Haiti Fashion Designer Showcase, the Metropolitan Emerging Designers and Indie Artists Showcase, and the 28th International Couture Collections show. The event most recently took place between September 27th and 29th 2024.

== Background ==
DCFW was founded in 2003 by Ean Williams, a menswear designer for his brand Corjor International. It is known for being the cheapest fashion week for new designers to showcase their designs. In 2014, Williams described the goal of DC Fashion week making "DC a center of international fashion." This goal is furthered by continually featuring international designers; for example the March 2008 show featured designers from Africa, Italy, Atlanta, Colombia, and Ukraine.

== See also ==
- List of fashion events
- List of fashion events in the United States
