= Pure London =

Coordinates: 51°29′47″N 0°12′35″W

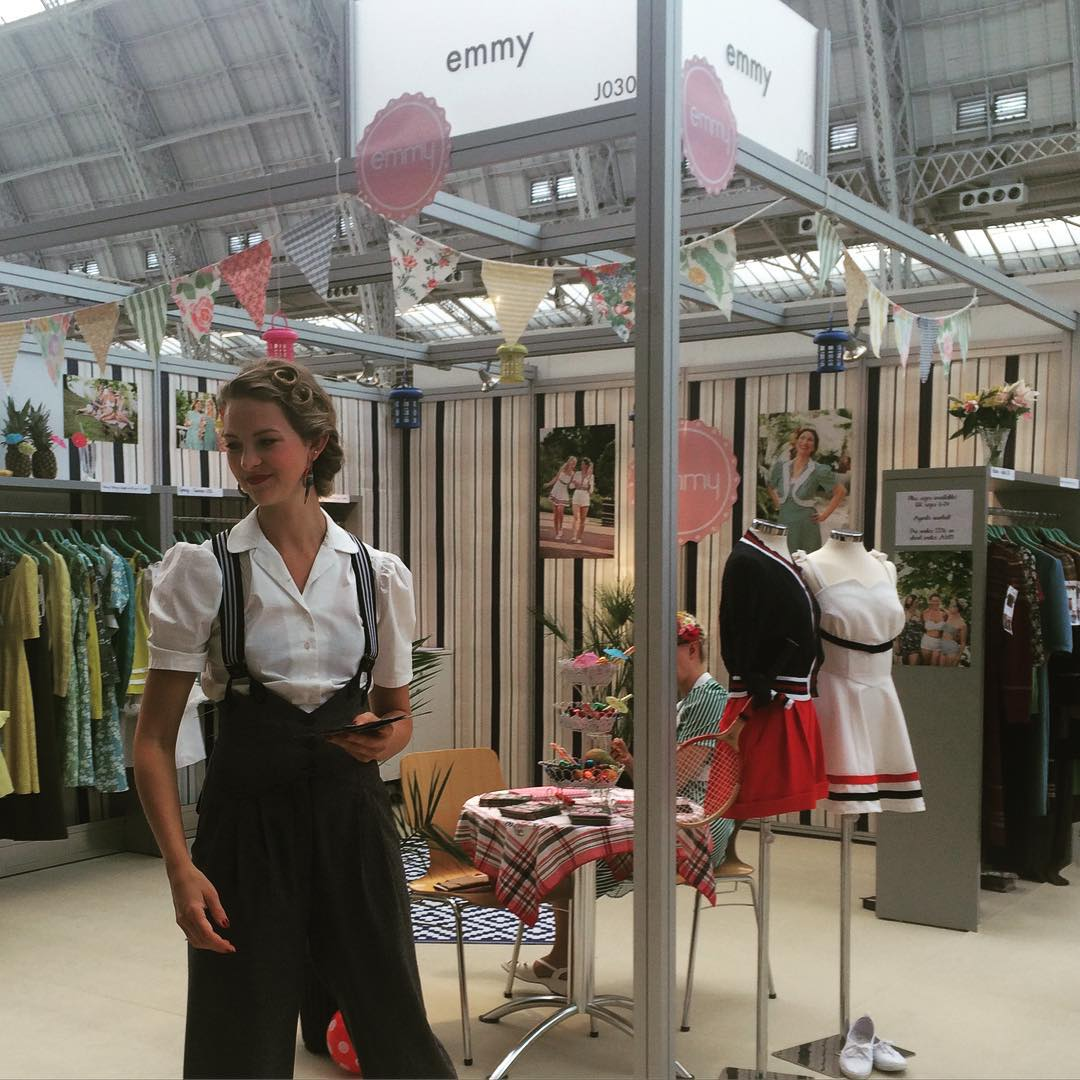
A vintage-inspired clothing display at Pure London 2015

Pure London is the United Kingdom's leading fashion trade show which takes place twice a year in Olympia, London. The timings of Pure ties in with the seasonal trends and buying patterns.

== Focus ==
Pure is predominantly focused on ready-to-wear womenswear, and has additional sections for young fashion (spirit) and footwear and accessories.

The trade-only event presents forward-order collections from over 1,000 fashion brands, with an audience of over 12,000 UK and worldwide retailers in attendance as audited by the Audit Bureau of Circulations.

It includes clothing examples and catwalk performances, fashion talks and retail advice. In addition to the brand showcases, Pure London features two stages of catwalk scenes, and a seminar programme addressing issues in fashion and retail.

Pure London provides high street fashion retailers and independent fashion retailers with the opportunity to source trend-led, premium clothing and wholesale fashion from leading brands. It attracts over 12,000 high quality fashion buyers from independent and department stores, multiples and e-tailers. Partnering with WGSN, the fashion exhibition holds daily trend briefings for Autumn/Winter and Spring/Summer trends. The seminar programme has expanded to include advice on setting up online stores, visual merchandising and styling sessions.
