= Bolivia Fashion Week =

Bolivian fashion industry event

Bolivia Fashion Week took place for the first time in Bolivia on April 5 to 8, 2016 in the Bolivian city of Cochabamba. Bolivia Fashion Week is an annual event that showcases both emerging designers, brands and cultural fashion innovators. The presence of Agatha Ruiz de la Prada from Spain, and other world designers in the Bolivia Fashion Week 2016 event, highlighted the goal of the fashion week to connect talented local designers with the global fashion industry, as stated by Bolivia Fashion Week's founder, Pamela Alarcon, General Producer Pierre Dulanto.
