= Nkem =

Given name

- Pronunciation: n-kem (n as in no, never, nine )
- Gender: male and female

Origin
- Origin: Igbo
- Meaning: May what is mine be mine, May I not lack what is mine
- Region of origin: Nigeria

Other names
- Related names: Nkemdilim/Nkemdirim, Nkemakonam, Nkemakolam, Nkemjika

Nkem // (pronounced n-kem as in never, no, nine) is a unisex given name found among the Igbo people of Nigeria. It is a short form of either Nkemdilim/Nkemdirim, Nkemjika, Nkemakolam or Nkemakonam and means "mine" or "my own."

== Notable people ==
- Nkem Akaraiwe (born 1996), Nigerian basketball player
- Dora Nkem Akunyili (1954–2014), Nigerian federal minister
- Nkem Ezurike (born 1992), Canadian soccer player
- Nkem Nwankwo (1936–2001), Nigerian novelist and poet
- Nkem Ojougboh (born 1987), Nigerian basketball player
- Nkem Okeke, Nigerian economist
- Nkem Okotcha (born 1977), Nigerian writer, editor and publisher
- Nkem Owoh (born 1958), Nigerian actor and comedian
