= Alejandre =

Alejandre may refer to:

== People ==
=== Spanish first surname ===
- Fernando Alejandre Martínez (born 1956), Spanish Army retired officer
- Salvador Mejia Alejandre (born 1961), Mexican producer and director

=== Surname ===
- Abel Alejandre (born 1958), hyperrealist artist
- Mac Alejandre (born 1972), Filipino film and television director
