= Manchester Fashion Week =

English fashion industry event

Manchester Fashion Week is an twice annual independent fashion showcase in Manchester, England. It was founded in 2011 by entrepreneur Jonathan Sassen.[1] Manchester Fashion Week has showcased the talent of designers and brands such as Vivienne Westwood, Mulberry, All Saints, and Ted Baker. With satellite events at other times.

Manchester Fashion Week is mostly produced by volunteers from across the UK originally, although recently many parts of the business have been contracted to regional partners . The event draws media, celebrities and international fashion bloggers due to a generous hospitality program. With a series of hotel partners and nightclub partners the event caters for all collaborators very well.

The event takes place in a range of notable venues across the city of Manchester. Previous venues have included The Avenue, National Football Museum, and the Halle St Peters building in Ancoats Manchester.

== History ==
Manchester Fashion Week has featured a wide variety of designers and retail brands, from established international brands such as Mulberry, AllSaints and Ted Baker, to up-and-coming talent such as Masato and Adnan Bayyat (whose designs have been sported by Lady Gaga).

The shows are arranged by industry division rather than by individual designer. These include Graduate Day, Independent Day, and notable final days. Most years have featured a concept fashion show, a ready to wear show, among others. They have always been closely linked with education with close ties to Manchester Metropolitan University, University of Manchester, and The Manchester Colleges.

The catwalk shows feature a mix of professional models and new faces, and some models first discovered at Manchester Fashion Week have since gone on to have successful modelling careers. Interns have played a major role in the operation being sought by Harvey Nichols, Tom Ford, and Net-a-Porter.

The general terms of the event are to bond a relationship between the higher and lower ends of the market unifying and strengthening all associated.

Within 2013, Manchester Fashion Week saw a postponement due to financial restraints, although returned to great success in 2014 with Spring/Summer shows, with a complete new rebranding centred on the hashtag #MCRFW.

Producing an Autumn/Winter and a Spring/Summer show over a week period involving local and national business will continue to be the method for collective success. The business and trade was eventually handed over to local Universities and Colleges as MCRFW had a great relationship with the fashion education in the city, continuing in there endeavour to support future generations of fashion in the city.
