= Fiji Fashion Week =

Fijian fashion industry event

Fiji Fashion Week is run by Fashion Week Limited, a limited liability company incorporated in the Republic of Fiji in January 2009.

For the first few years of Fiji Fashion Week, the Fijian fashion industry was considered "fledgling", "a surprise", and "a novelty", but by 2025 it has been discussed as part of a wider Pacific movement toward sustainable fashion.

== History ==
Fiji Fashion Week was established in 2008 as an initiative aimed at recognising the creativity of Fijian designers and revitalising the local fashion industry. The first four-day event was held at the Hilton Hotel at Denarau in Nadi.

In 2009 Ellen Whippy-Knight succeeded Donnalesi Whippy in the leadership of the event and relocated it to Suva. Fiji Fashion Week Ltd was incorporated in January 2009 to develop and manage the event and support the growth of the fashion industry in Fiji.

By 2017 the event had reached its tenth year and featured designers from across the Pacific Islands. In 2018 the event celebrated its eleventh year.

== Recent coverage ==
The 2025 edition marked the eighteenth iteration of the event and attracted increasing international attention. Recent discussions of Pacific fashion have highlighted sustainability and the use of traditional materials and techniques as emerging strengths of the region's fashion industry.
