= Colorado Health Network =

American nonprofit organization

- Abbreviation: CHN
- Formation: 1983
- Type: 501(c)(3) non-profit organization
- Headquarters: Denver, Colorado, U.S.
- CEO: Darrell Vigil
- Website: coloradohealthnetwork.org
- Formerly called: Colorado AIDS Project

Colorado Health Network (CHN) is a 501(c)(3) nonprofit organization based in Colorado that provides health and support services to individuals living with or at risk of HIV/AIDS. Additionally they offer programs and resources for individuals impacted by hepatitis C, STDs, and substance abuse. The organization's CEO is Darrell Vigil.

== Fundraisers ==
As a nonprofit organization, Colorado Health Network runs multiple annual fundraising events throughout the year.

=== Red Ball ===
Red Ball is an annual fundraiser fashion event in Denver, organized to raise AIDS awareness and honor World AIDS Day. The red-themed event is inspired by the AIDS awareness ribbon.

=== Red Ribbon Ball ===
Red Ribbon Ball is a fundraising event ran since 1994. The event had 200 guests in 2022, and raised $35,000. Sponsors included Gilead, UCHealth, Centura / Penrose Hospital, El Pomar Foundation, Infectious Disease Specialists, Gray Line, Walgreens, Cheetah Printing, Ent Credit Union, Peak Vista Community Health Centers.
