= Colombo Fashion Week =

Fashion event in Colombo

- Genre: Clothing and fashion exhibitions
- Frequency: Semiannual
- Locations: Colombo, Sri Lanka
- Inaugurated: 2003
- Organiser: CFW Holdings Pvt. Ltd
- Website: http://www.colombofashionweek.com

Colombo Fashion Week (CFW), is a semiannual fashion show held in Colombo, Sri Lanka, with spring/summer (February – March) and Swim Wear in autumn (September – October); Swim Week Colombo. It was created in 2003 by Ajai Vir Singh. It is organised by CFW Holdings and sponsored by HSBC.

It is known for being one of the few fashion weeks in Asia that has lasted over ten years. It aims to serve as a hub for South Asian fashion. Where designers from neighbouring countries like Pakistan, Bangladesh and India take part.

== Locations ==
CFW has been held at the Hilton Colombo for most of its lifespan. More recently it was held at Shangri-La Colombo, and also Port City Colombo.

== Swim Week Colombo ==
Swim Week Colombo is the first and most premiere platform in Asia for swimwear fashion, facilitating a responsible ecosystem from Manufacturing, to Designing to Retail. Presenting Sri Lanka's best swimwear designers; regional and international, and promoting fusion with local crafts. It is sponsored by OLU Water.

== Attendance ==
Admission to shows at Colombo Fashion week is by invitation only, with specific events included.

== Awards ==
CFW gives three awards; Lifetime Achievement Award, Gen-Next award and the Face of CFW award to deserving individuals.

== See also ==
- Fashion week
- List of fashion events
- List of fashion designers
