= Christian Fashion Week =

Christian fashion show

- Status: Active
- Genre: Fashion
- Frequency: Annual
- Locations: Tampa, Florida
- Country: United States
- Inaugurated: 2013
- Founders: Jose Gomez, Mayra Brignoni, Wil Lugo, and Tamy Lugo
- Most recent: May 25, 2024

Christian Fashion Week was an annual fashion show that celebrated fashion from a Christian worldview. It is the first fashion week to claim faith as a basis. The organization and event was founded by entrepreneurs Jose Gomez, Mayra Gomez, Wil Lugo, and Tamy Lugo, all from Tampa, Florida. The first annual event, Christian Fashion Week 2013, was held on February 8, 2013, and featured 8 designers from around the US. The event attracted over 300 attendees and over 2,000 online viewers.

The event attracted an international audience after a syndicated story by the Associated Press was published on February 7, 2013. The article cast a spotlight on designers debuting at the show such as Julia Chew and Alma Vidovic. Executive Director, Jose Gomez, stated: "Modesty is the right thing to do.... The fashion industry operates under certain assumptions, but there is an alternative." Author and speaker Shari Braendel was a featured guest and speaker.

== Growth ==
In 2014, the organization expanded the event from two days to an entire week. The event started with the first International Day of Prayer for Art and Fashion. The week continued with various workshops and shopping days, culminating in two days of fashion shows in Tampa, Florida.

The event was covered by over 40 media outlets, including:

- BuzzFeed.com
- PerezHilton.com
- ChristianPost.com
- The Tampa Tribune

The event attracted over 10,000 online viewers and, according to the organization's Facebook page, led to a retail edition of the show in Atlanta during the 2014 International Christian Retail Show, held by the Christian Booksellers Association (CBA) in partnership with Christians In Fashion. In 2015, the fashion event was covered by the New York Times. At the time, Christian Fashion Week issued a statement saying that 2015 would be its last season.

== Return ==
In 2024, after an eight-year hiatus and change in ownership, an event using the same name and branding as Christian Fashion Week returned, in Martinsburg, West Virginia. The new ownership includes Miss Uganda 1997, Lilian McClung and one of the founders, Mayra Gomez.
