= Austin Fashion Week =

Semiannual event in Texas, US

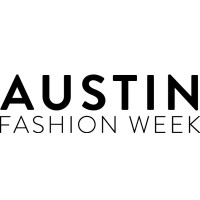
- Status: Active
- Genre: Fashion
- Frequency: Semiannual
- Locations: Austin, Texas
- Country: United States
- Established: 2007
- Founder: Victor Quinteros Marquina
- Most recent: 2024
- Next event: 2026

Austin Fashion Week (ATXFW), is semiannual fashion event that takes place in Austin, Texas during the spring and fall seasons. The event is typically three days long and includes runway shows, pop-up shops and an award ceremony. In recent years, around 50 designers have presented full, or capsule collections. Founded by Victor Quinteros Marquina in 2007, and the most recent event took place in 2023. A license holder renamed the event as Fashion X Austin, and Austin Fashion For Good in 2019. Quinteros does not endorsed that direction The 2020 edition took place in October and was a virtual event. Most recently, Austin Fashion Week took place in 2024, and the next planned event is for the 2025 spring season.

== See also ==
- List of fashion events
- List of fashion events in the United States
