= Glamorama (Macy's) =

Annual fashion event (1992–2015)

Glamorama was an annual fashion event taking place in Minneapolis, Chicago, Los Angeles and San Francisco, featuring top American and international fashion designers and celebrities. The fashion show originated by Dayton-Hudson Corporation later operated through sponsorship by Target Corporation, The May Department Stores Company and Macy's, Inc. during its history, concluding in 2015.

Glamorama debuted under Dayton's as A Cause for Applause in Minneapolis in 1992 and became known as Fash Bash in 1995. The Dayton's stores were renamed Marshall Field's in 2001 and sold to the May Company in 2004. The show was renamed Glamorama in 2003. In 2005, the May Company was acquired by Federated Department Stores which rebranded the Marshall Field's stores as Macy's in 2006.

Performers and presenters for the event over the years included Robin Thicke, Cyndi Lauper, MC Hammer, Queen Latifah, Ellen DeGeneres, Brooke Shields, Ryan Seacrest, Cee-lo Green, Big & Rich, Beyoncé Knowles, Kelly Rowland, B-52’s, Wayne Newton, Pussycat Dolls, Ne-Yo, Macy Gray, Bruno Mars, Sheryl Crow, and Jason Derulo.

During its 23 years, Glamorama contributed nearly $5 million to the Minneapolis-based Children’s Cancer Research Fund. The show used 42 computers, 350 lighting fixtures, 12 projectors and 60,000 watts of sound. A total of 80 LED panels comprising more than 725,000 pixels and totaling nearly 500 square feet comprised the LED wall serving as the backdrop for the one-hour show, the result of more than a year's worth of planning.
