= Pittsburgh Fashion Week =

- Frequency: Annual
- Locations: Pittsburgh, Pennsylvania
- Inaugurated: 2010
- Website: www.pittsburghfashionweek.com

Pittsburgh Fashion Week is an annual fashion week held in Pittsburgh, Pennsylvania.

Pittsburgh model Miyoshi Anderson, created the event to help highlight the fashion industry in Pittsburgh, which had been struggling with the closure of several major department stores.

The first Pittsburgh Fashion Week was held in 2010, with events held in Heinz History Center and the Omni William Penn Hotel. The inaugural class of the Pittsburgh Fashion Hall of Fame was selected that week. The second event, in 2011, was held shortly after GQ named Pittsburgh the third worst-dressed city, a distinction participants disputed.

The third Fashion Week had a theme of "ecologically friendly fashion."

One event focused exclusively on men's fashion. Local celebrities modeled some fashion.

Organizers plan on producing a fourth event in 2013.
