= Nepal Fashion Week =

Nepalese fashion industry event

Nepal Fashion Week (also known as The Himalayan Times TGIF Nepal Fashion Week) is an event organized and promoted by IEC College of Art and Fashion and sponsored by the McDowell's Signature, Emirates and Himalayan Times.

From 2009 onwards the fashion week has been held annually in the capital city of Kathmandu. TGIF Nepal Fashion Week 2011 had 34 designers showcasing their collections on the catwalk.

TGIF Fashion Week is a fashion show event organizer company in Nepal. Celebrities and fashion models from around the world come to model for the designers to promote their designs. The fashion week lasts for four days with all the glitz and glamour on the catwalk.
