= Red Ball (event) =

Charity fashion event in Denver, Colorado

- Status: Active
- Genre: Fashion
- Frequency: Annually
- Locations: Denver, Colorado
- Country: United States
- Years active: 14
- Established: 2008
- Previous event: 2022
- Next event: 2023
- Organizer: Colorado Health Network
- Website: coloradohealthnetwork.org/events/red-ball

Red Ball is an annual charity fashion event for AIDS Awareness and in honor of World AIDS day held in Denver, Colorado. It is put on by the nonprofit Colorado Health Network (Formerly The Denver Colorado AIDS Project) to "Ignite Awareness for World AIDS Day". Held once a year, the event typically coincides with World AIDS Day or AIDS Awareness Week. The red theming of the event is inspired by the red AIDS awareness ribbon.

Local and national designers have presented at the event, and are encouraged to incorporate red into their collections. Student designers in the fashion program at Rocky Mountain College of Art and Design often present designs as well.

== History ==
In 2013 the event drew close to 1,000 guests. During the 2020 COVID-19 pandemic, the event moved online as a series of short videos, featuring new and returning designers. That year, Rocky Mountain College of Art and Design held a "Red Ball Exhibition" at the college's Rotunda Gallery, featuring garments and photography from students and faculty that had been created for the Red Ball.
