= Boston Fashion Week =

Annual fashion event in Massachusetts

- Status: Active
- Genre: Fashion
- Frequency: Annual
- Locations: Boston, Massachusetts, United States
- Country: United States
- Inaugurated: 1995
- Founder: Jay Calderin
- Most recent: May 2023
- Next event: October 13 - 19, 2025
- Website: www.bostonfashionweek.com

Boston Fashion Week
- Location within Massachusetts
- Coordinates: 42°21′29″N 71°03′49″W

Boston Fashion Week is a week-long luxury clothing event that takes place annually in Boston, United States. Fashion Week allows for international and local designers to showcase their creations to the general public, buyers, celebrities, and fashion experts. The event was established in the city by Jay Calderin in 1995. It faced a few setbacks in the early years, but is now increasing its popularity and importance, as Boston becomes a more fashion forward city. Accessibility and diversity in programming allow the public to engage the week on many levels; experiencing a show, taking in an exhibit, participating in an educational program or joining in the festivities at a party. The week also contributes to a sense of civic pride about what the region has to offer and how it continues to evolve.

== History ==
The Boston Fashion Week was founded by Jay Calderin in 1995.
Unlike other global fashion events such as the New York Fashion Week, Boston Fashion Week is a non-profit event with a low budget, that focuses on showcasing mainly local designers. However, the event was put on hiatus in 2004 because Jay Calderin felt that the show didn't match the quality of the clothes and was becoming very repetitive. Boston Fashion Week began again in September 2007. The event returned more powerful and with more attention of the media. It includes fashion shows and networking events. The week also contributes to a sense of civic pride about what the region has to offer and how it continues to evolve. In the year of 2013 the Boston Fashion Week was held between September 27 and October 25 and it was specially dedicated to Alfred Fiandaca, who was a leading Bostonian fashion designer.

=== Jay Calderin ===
Jay Calderin is the founder of the Boston Fashion Week as well as the Executive Director. He was born and raised in New York City. He is a successful author of Fashion Design Essentials and Form, Fit & Fashion which the Los Angeles Times called, "a new fashion bible for designers, aspirers and the just plain curious, this tome contains all the secrets." He has been involved with the charity of Big Brothers for over 10 years and states that it has been one of the most rewarding experiences. The Boston Globe refers to Jay Calderin as "a budding designer's best friend." Calderin founded Boston Fashion Week, and has served as the organization's Executive Director since 1995. In 2012 he was appointed Creative Director of the first Chengdu Fashion Week in China. His work as a fashion designer has appeared in Vogue and Elle magazines. He is an instructor and the Director of Creative Marketing at the School of Fashion Design in Boston. He also teaches at the Museum of Fine Arts, Boston, and the Massachusetts College of Art and Design.

== Examples of events ==
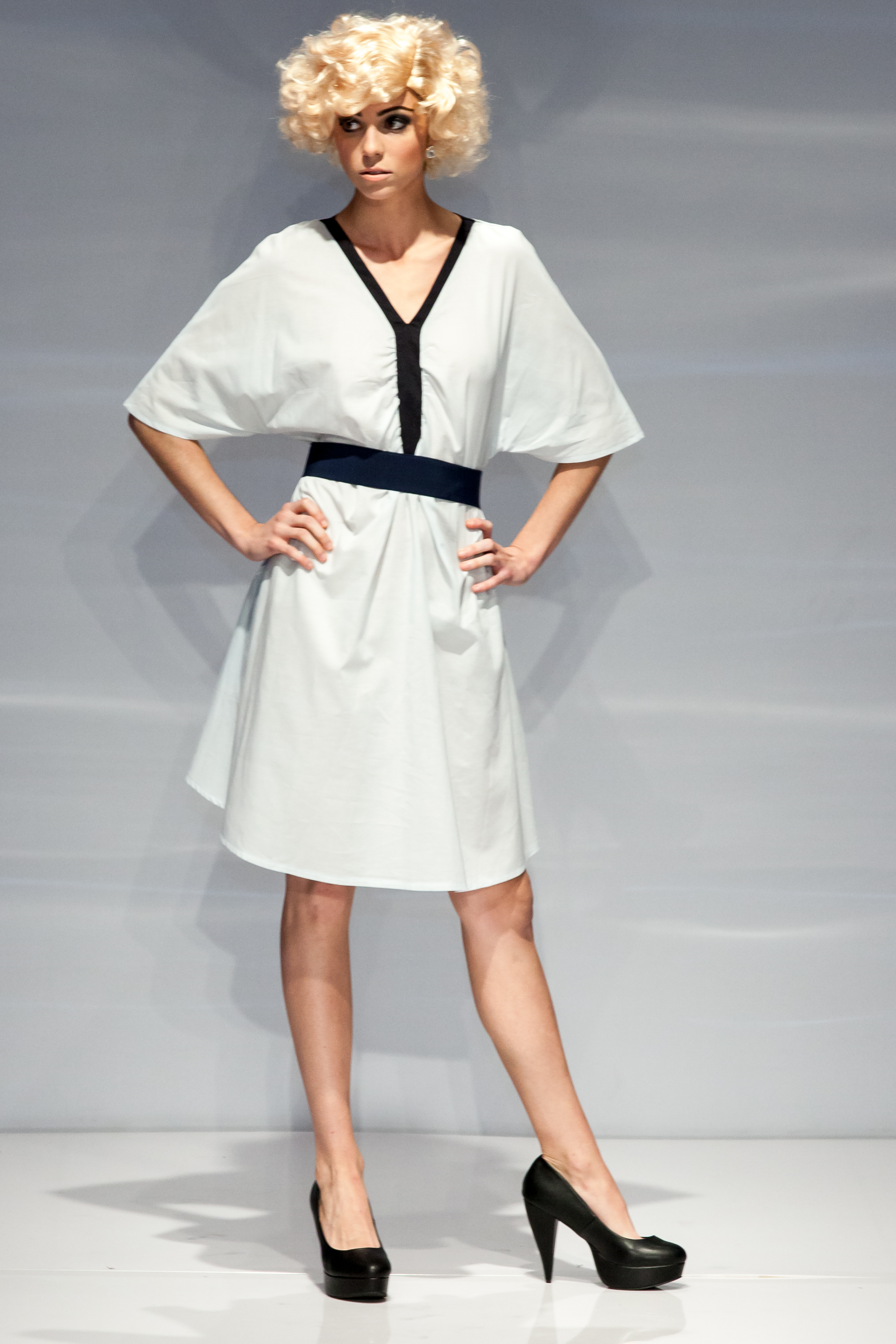
g.KIM – Boston Fashion Week 2012

Each year the Fashion Week returns for one week with all sorts of shows. This is an example of the 2009 Fashion Week

Thursday :
Bay State College Graduate Fashion Show took place in John Hancock Hall, Dorothy Quincy Suite

Friday :
• MassArt Senior Collection Fashion Show took place in Boston Center for the Arts
• Lasell Undergraduate Fashion Show took place in Lasell College Campus

Saturday :
• Lasell College Graduate Fashion Show took place in Lasell College Campus
• Mount Ida Graduate Fashion Show took place in Back Bay Events Center

Saturday :
School of Fashion Design 75th Anniversary Fashion Show took place in the Boston Park Plaza Imperial Ballroom.

Saturday :
RISD Collection 2009 – Show Veteran's Memorial Auditorium Avenue of the Arts (Francis & Park Streets.) In Providence, Rhode Island.

Wednesday :
MassArt Sophomore/Junior Fashion Show took place in MassArt Auditorium.

== General pricing ==
As the audience of Boston Fashion Week includes a wide range of different kind of people, such as celebrities, journalists, designers, and the general public, the pricing also shows huge variation. It varies according to the day and time of the event, the designer that is being showcased, the location, and the sitting arrangement. Tickets are available online, and there may be a difference of $100,00 USD in VIP front row tickets and general admission sitting. While some seats and runway shows are available through special invitation only, there also are days in which the event is freely open to the general public.

== New designers' showcase ==
The Tent, an event within Boston Fashion Week, was first launched in September 2011 with the purpose of improving the profile of Boston Fashion Week, as well to present the creations of local designers. It allows them to successfully show their talent, giving them an opportunity to sprout their business. Since the creation of Boston Fashion Week in 1995, the Tent only happened twice, in 2011 and 2012, although it was very well received by the general public.

=== The Tent 2011 ===
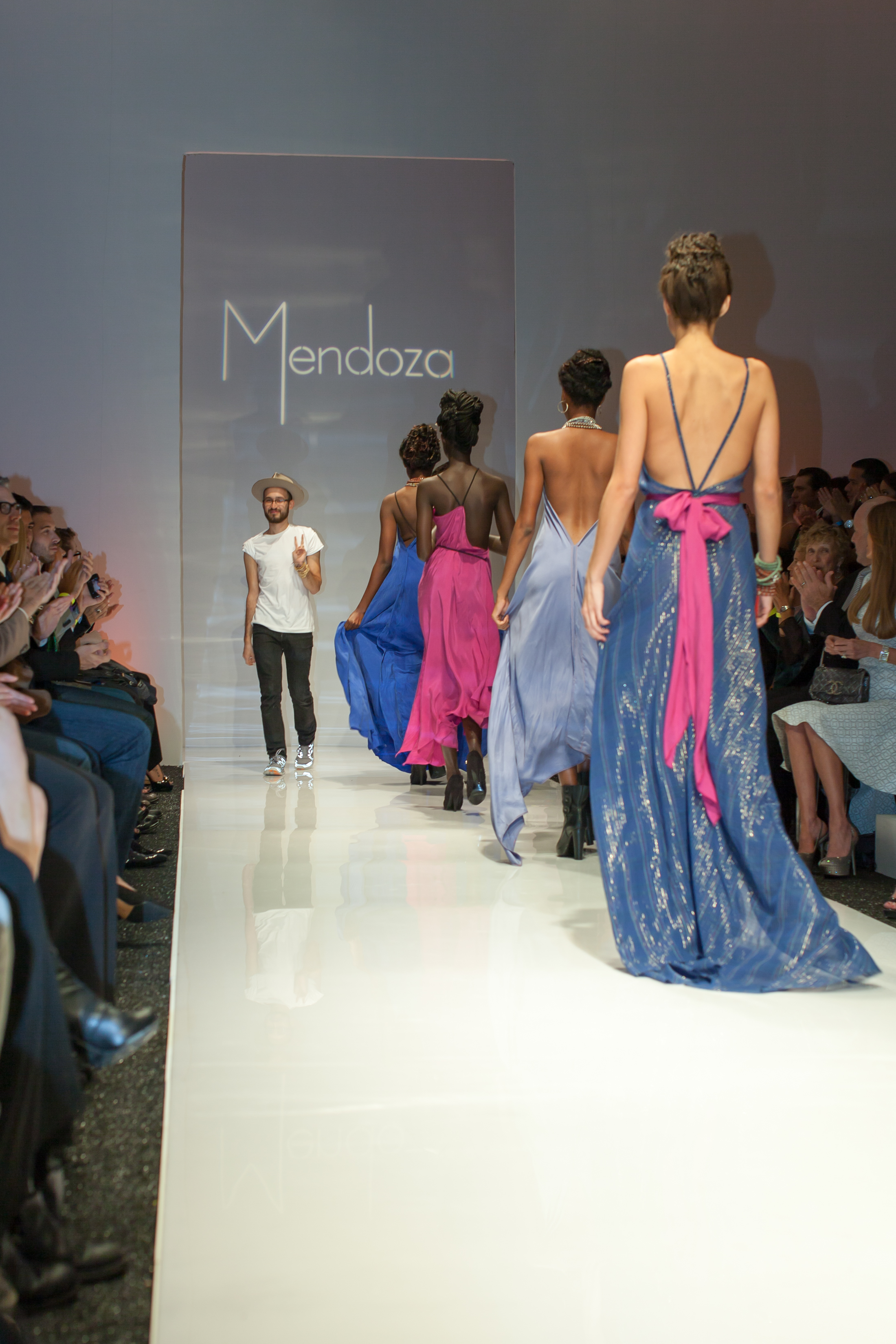
Sam Mendoza – Boston Fashion Week 2012

The first year of The Tent presented local well-known designers such as Emily Muller, Michael DePaulo, Daniel Faucher Couture amongst others. It took place from September 23 to 30, 2011. Access to The Tent was only under special invitation, which made this event front-page news. It consisted in a 3,000-square-foot tent containing 200 seats, established between the Prudential Center and the Mandarin Oriental Hotel. Around 20 designers were present and each one of them had 15 minutes to showcase their creations. The first year of The Tent presented local well-known designers such as Emily Muller, Michael DePaulo, Daniel Faucher Couture amongst others. It took place from September 23 to 30, 2011. Access to The Tent was only under special invitation, which made this event front-page news. It consisted in a 3,000-square-foot tent containing 200 seats, established between the Prudential Center and the Mandarin Oriental Hotel. Around 20 designers were present and each one of them had 15 minutes to showcase their creations.

=== The Tent 2012 ===
The second year of The Tent was presented with a twist. Unlike the previous year, a parade of well-known designers, including style guru Marilyn Riseman and the Fashion School of Design recruiter Jane Conway Caspe, skimmed through 80 possible designer's and chose the best 10 (nine of which were local, while the other one was from California). Those selected few had their creations showcased at The Tent.

According to Boston Fashion Week's founder, Jay Calderin, he was looking for diversity of styles on the runway, instead of 10 gown designers and 10 wedding dress designers, like the last year's event. This allowed for an edgier, original, and more varied edition of the Tent.

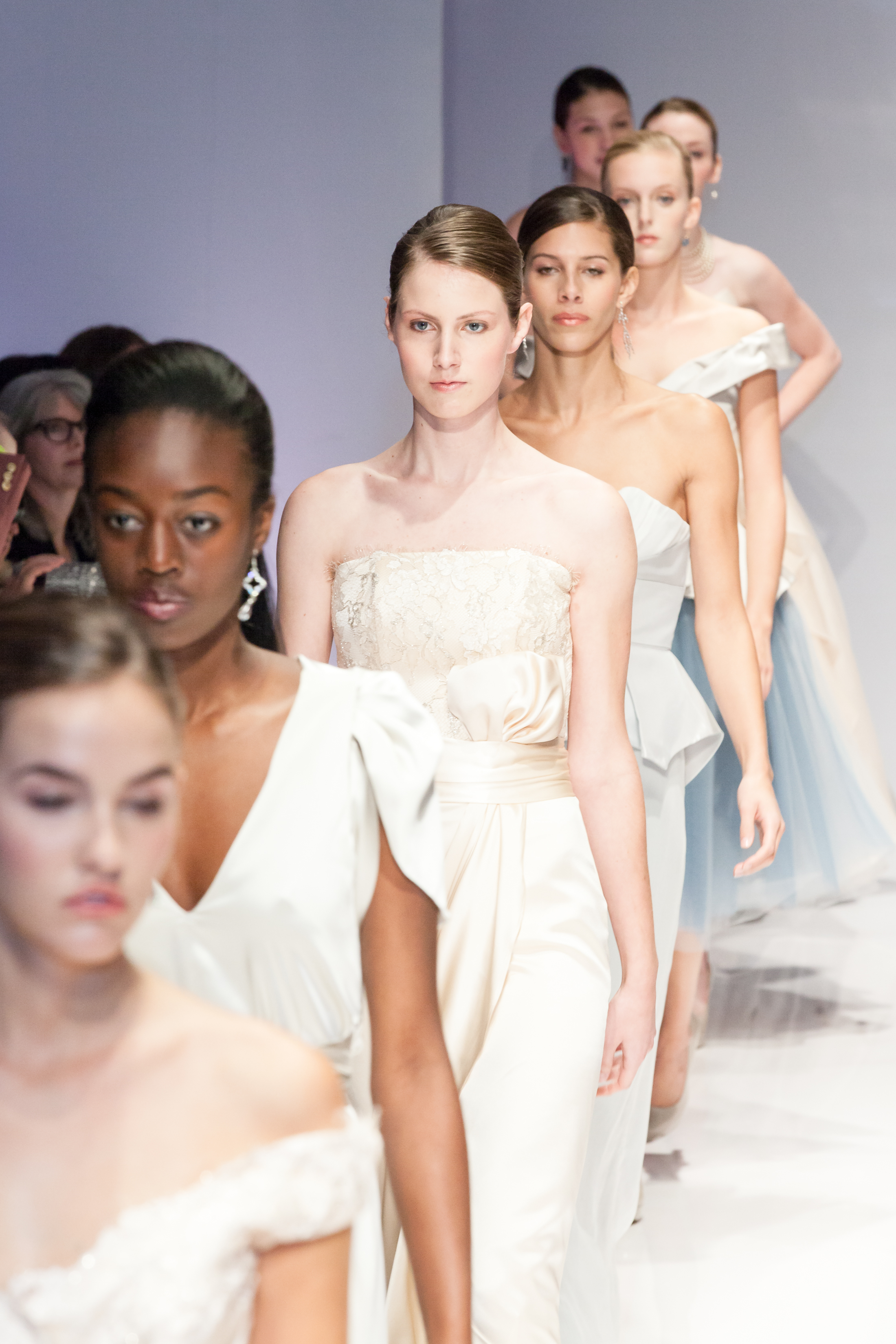
Luke Aaron – Boston Fashion Week 2012

=== The end of the Tent ===
When it first started in 2011, the tent at Boston Fashion Week was front-page news. In 2013, The Boston Fashion Week surprised its spectators with the cancellation of The Tent. Scheduled from September 27 until October 5, the fashion week in 2013 was not anchored by an official tent.

The reason behind the cancellation of The Tent in 2013 was the lack of sponsorship to continue paying its expenses. According to Calderin, The Tent helped encourage up-coming designers to come forward, and show them a new level of production. It is uncertain if The Tent will return in 2014
