= Snow Xue Gao =

Snow Xue Gao is a Chinese fashion designer. She runs the New York-based luxury womenswear brand Snow Xue Gao which she established in 2017. The brand is known for its blending of traditional Chinese elements with Western tailoring.
