= Men's Fashion Week =

Men's Fashion Week, typically held twice a year in January and June, is a series of international fashion industry events where menswear collections are shown to buyers, stylists, the media, and in some cases, the general public.

== International Events ==
The following are international events in order of founding.

=== France ===
In France, Paris Fashion Week promotes its men's runway show, Menswear Paris Fashion Week, as a part of its regular schedule. It is overseen by the Fédération de la Haute Couture et de la Mode (FHCM). FHCM is composed of three "central bodies," namely men's fashion, women's fashion, and haute couture. Its history dates back to 1868 when its first founding organization, Chambre Syndicale de la Couture was formed.

=== Italy ===
In Milan, Italy, Camera Nazionale della Moda Italiana (CNMI) organizes Milano Fashion Week Men's. CNMI's predecessor, Camera Sindacale della Moda Italiana was established in June 1958.

=== Germany ===
Germany unveiled its International Menswear Exhibition on 26 August 1960 in Cologne, in the then West Germany. The event featured wool and silk fabrics for the next year's season.

=== United States ===
In July 2015, New York Fashion Week (NYFW) launched New York Fashion Week: Men's. NYFW is owned and organized by the Council of Fashion Designers of America (CFDA). New York City held its first menswear event over 30 years ago in August 1989.

=== Canada ===
In September 2011, the Vancouver Men's Fashion Week (v.MFW) was inaugurated in Canada. It was Canada's first-ever menswear fashion industry event. v.MFW was founded and organized by Ramos & Fortier Ltd., a Canadian company, whose objectives according to its site are to: "give up-and-coming Canadian menswear designers a platform to show their creations" and "support research in textile sustainability," among others. The company participates in various events and conferences within Vancouver, British Columbia that promote the creative economy, such as the inaugural BCreative Conference to give ideas and suggestions to the province on how to improve and build its creative industry. The company and its signature event have been featured and discussed in academia, in a conference, in television, in newspapers, in magazines, and in a book. Past sponsors of v.MFW were Kiehl's, Clarins Men, and A*Men fragrance by Thierry Mugler.

Three years after Vancouver, a second menswear event was held in Canada, this time in the City of Toronto, Ontario. Toronto Men's Fashion Week (TOM*) was launched in August 2014.

=== United Kingdom ===
In the United Kingdom, the British Fashion Council (BFC) is the governing body for London Fashion Week (LFW), and says on its site that it, "strengthens British fashion in the global economy as a leader in responsible, creative businesses." In June 2012, LFW launched London Collections: Men, a weekend of menswear fashion shows. It was later renamed London Fashion Week Men's and was held in June 2019.

=== United Arab Emirates ===
In January 2021, the Arab Fashion Council (AFC) launched Arab Fashion Week-Men's in Dubai. AFC aims "to establish a fashion system... by uniting the 22 Arab countries under one umbrella..." AFC was founded in May 2015.

=== Other Events ===
Additional events have been held in Singapore, Puerto Rico, Los Angeles, and South Africa.

== Schedule disruptions due to COVID-19 ==
In an unprecedented occurrence, all three European men's fashion weeks, Paris, Milan and London have canceled their respective live events in 2020 due to the SARS-CoV-2 coronavirus pandemic (COVID-19). New York followed suit and postponed its June event that year. In April of the same year, BFC announced it will combine its menswear events into the womenswear shows for the next 12 months and will only run digitally for its June show.
