= Costume Art =

High fashion art exhibition

Costume Art is the 2026 high fashion art exhibition of the Anna Wintour Costume Center, a wing of the Metropolitan Museum of Art which houses the collection of the Costume Institute. The exhibition was announced on 17 November 2025. The exhibit includes nearly 400 pieces from the museum's collection, including gowns, armor, and vases.

== Met Gala ==
The Costume Institute at the Metropolitan Museum of Art inaugurates its annual exhibition with a formal benefit dinner at The Costume Institute Benefit, also informally known as the Met Gala. The gala for the 2026 exhibition took place on 4 May 2026. The co-chairs for the event were Anthony Vaccarello and Zoë Kravitz.

== Exhibition ==
The exhibit is divided into two main sections, "Diversity in Bodily Being" and "Bodily Being in Its Universality". The first section is subdivided into "Reclaimed Body", "Disabled Body", "Pregnant Body", "Corpulent Body", "Naked and Nude Body", "Classical Body" and "Abstract Body". Designers featured include:

- Jonathan Anderson
- Andreadamo
- Melitta Baumeister
- Matthieu Blazy
- Thom Browne
- Tory Burch
- Sarah Burton
- Maria Grazia Chiuri
- Comme des Garçons
- Doublet
- Dilara Findikoglu
- John Galliano
- Ying Gao
- Jean Paul Gaultier
- Rudi Gernreich
- Madame Grès
- Demna Gvasalia
- Batsheva Hay
- Eta Hentz
- Peter Jensen
- Christopher Kane
- Michael Kors
- Claude Lalanne
- Helmut Lang
- Duran Lantink
- Louise Linderoth
- Chet Lo
- Lùchen
- Ester Manas
- Glenn Martens
- Alexander McQueen
- Alessandro Michele
- Issey Miyake
- Thierry Mugler
- Pieter Mulier
- Yuima Nakazato
- Kei Ninomiya
- Sinéad O'Dwyer
- Di Petsa
- Richard Quinn
- Grover Rad
- Daniel Roseberry
- Olivier Rousteing
- Yves Saint Laurent
- Marine Serre
- Olivier Theyskens
- Riccardo Tisci
- Anthony Vaccarello
- Iris van Herpen
- Karoline Vitto
- Vivienne Westwood
- Robert Wun
- Yohji Yamamoto
- Yiqing Yin
- Xander Zhou

As part of the effort to show how art and fashion interact with the human body, curator Andrew Bolton commissioned custom mannequins to display the garments featured in the exhibit. Seeking to showcase a diverse range of body types, the mannequins were modeled on real people. These included:

- Sinéad Burke, Irish disability activist
- Aimee Mullins, American athlete
- Aariana Rose Philip, Antiguan-American model and musician
- Antwan Tolliver, American disability activist
- Sonia Vera, Venezuelan model and swimwear designer
- Goddess Bunny, American drag artist
- Jade O'Belle, British model and artist
- Charlie Reynolds, Canadian model
- Michaela Stark, Australian artist and corsetier
- Yseult, French singer-songwriter

== Reception ==
ARTnews criticized the exhibition's curation for not providing enough context and for shallow juxtapositions. Selvedge negatively likened the exhibition's treatment of othered bodies to that of cabinet of curiosities' treatment of medical oddities, saying the parts of the exhibition dealing with shared human anatomy like blood and viscera were more successful. Wallpaper* found it "deeply-researched" and spoke to the exhibition's sense of optimism.

== Publication and merchandise ==
A catalog and collector's edition The Body Electric accompanied the exhibition. The Met Store also sold a scarf designed by Tory Burch, nesting dolls designed by Thom Browne, as well as a T-shirt and tote bag designed by Michael Kors.
