= ANDAM =

ANDAM Fashion Awards Paris
- Awarded for: Fashion
- Sponsored by: Association Nationale pour le Développement des Arts de la Mode, French Ministry of Culture, Defi Mode
- Location: Paris
- Country: France
- First award: 1989
- Website: www.andam.fr

ANDAM is a French fashion award established in 1989 by Nathalie Dufour as a joint venture between the French Ministry of Culture and the DEFI Mode fashion organisation. Presented by the Association Nationale pour le Développement des Arts de la Mode, it has been recognised as a benchmark for designers, fashion professionals, and members of the international press, and as a pathway for young designers hoping to enter the Paris Fashion Week.

The awards were originally restricted to Europeans living in France, but entry was extended to international candidates in 2005.

In 2011, a new First Collection Prize was introduced, providing a €60,000 grant to a French fashion company. In 2012, the value of the global awards was increased to €290,000, with a €60 000 L'Express Style prize being introduced.

In 2018, the value of the global awards reached €430 000 with four prizes: the Grand Prix, the Creative Brand Prize, the Accessories Prize, and the Innovation Prize for designers, entrepreneur or start-ups willing to develop a project in France. The Innovation Prize recognises creative, innovative and technological solutions in the field of fashion design, production and distribution to develop an accountable and transparent fashion, taking into account economic, environmental and social issues.

In the same year, Guillaume Houzé replaced Pierre Bergé as the president of the awards.

== Notable events ==
- 1989: Martin Margiela is the first winner.
- 1994: Viktor & Rolf win the fellowship.
- 1995: Christophe Lemaire wins the competition, going on to become artistic director for Hermès.
- 1998: Jeremy Scott wins, going on to collaborate with Longchamp.
- 2000: Lutz Huelle wins, going on to be Artistic Director for Jesús del Pozo and working for Max Mara and Brioni (brand) as well as being artistic director for his namesake brand Lutz Huelle. He is also, since 2021, responsible for the Fashion Design Department at HEAD in Geneva.
- 2003: Anne-Valérie Hash wins, going on to work with Galeries Lafayette.
- 2005: ANDAM opens its competition to international candidates not residing in France allowing Bernhard Willhelm to win the prize. Felipe Oliveira Baptista, former artistic director for Lacoste, collaborates with LVMH and Beams (Japon).
- 2007: Bruno Pieters is financed by Yves Saint Laurent and Fondation Pierre Bergé - Yves Saint Laurent.
- 2008: ANDAM creates a single international award totaling €150,000. Gareth Pugh is the fellowship winner of this new edition.
- 2009: Creation of a second prize, the Young Fashion Designer Award, won by Ligia Diaz. Longchamp collaborate with Jeremy Scott, Bless and Charles Anastase, previous ANDAM winners. ANDAM celebrates its 20th anniversary.
- 2010: ANDAM organizes its first “fashion dinner” hosted by the French Minister of Culture, rue de Valois, surrounded by the major actors of the contemporary fashion scene.
- 2011: ANDAM awards Anthony Vaccarello with a €200,000 endowment, allowing him to create his French structure. The First Collection Award is introduced with Yiqing Yin winning a €60,000 endowment.
- 2012: ANDAM awards Julien David with a €230,000 endowment and Pièce d'Anarchive with a €60,000 grant.
- 2013: ANDAM awards Alexandre Mattiussi with a €250,000 endowment and Christine Phung with €75,000 and the First Collection Prize.
- 2014: ANDAM awards Iris Van Herpen with a €250,000 endowment and Sébastien Meyer with €75,000 and the First Collection Prize
- 2015: ANDAM awards Stéphane Ashpool with a €250,-00 endowment, the First Collection Prize Léa Peckre with €100,000 endowment and Accessories Prize Charlotte Chesnais with €50,000 endowment
- 2016: ANDAM awards Wanda Nylon with a €250,000 endowment, the First Collection Prize Atlein with €100,000 endowment and Accessories Prize Tomasini Paris with €50,000 endowment
- 2017: ANDAM awards Y/Project with a €250,000 endowment, AVOC with €100,000 First Collection Prize endowment, Ana Khouri with €50,000 Accessories Prize endowment and Euveka with €30,000 Innovation Prizeendowment
- 2018: ANDAM awards Atlein with a €250,000 endowment, the First Collection Prize Ludovic de Saint Sernin with €100,000 endowment, Accessories Prize D’Heygère with €50,000 endowment and Innovation Prize Colorifix with €30,000 endowment
- 2019: ANDAM awards Koché with a €250,000 endowment, the Creative Label Prize to Nicolas Lecourt Mansion with €100,000, the Accessories Prize to Khaoré with €50,000, and the Innovation Prize to Worn Again Technologies with €30,000
- 2020: In a special edition repurposed in response to the coronavirus crisis, the family fund award goes to Marine Serre with €200,000 and Y/Project with €150,000, the Pierre Bergé Prize to Mossi with €100,000, and the Innovation Prize to Tekyn with €50,000
- 2021: ANDAM awards Bianca Saunders with a €300,000 endowment, the Pierre Bergé Prize to Egon Lab, the Accessories Prize to ASWAD with €50,000, and the Innovation Prize to Spinnova with €50,000
- 2023: ANDAM awards LGN Louis-Gabriel Nouchi with a €300,000 endowment, the Special Prize to both Ester Manas and Duran Lantink with €100,000 each, the Pierre Bergé Prize to Avellano with €100,000, the Accessories Prize to Ruslan Baginskiy with €100,000, and the Innovation Prize to SQIM with €100,000
- 2024: ANDAM awards Christopher Esber with a €300,000 endowment, the Special Prize to 3. Paradis, the Pierre Bergé Prize to Pièces Uniques with €100,000, the Accessories Prize to Maeden with €100,000, and the Innovation Prize to Alternative Innovation with €100,000
- 2025: ANDAM awards Meryll Rogge with a €300,000 endowment, the Special Prize to Alain Paul with €100,000, the Pierre Bergé Prize to Burc Akyol with €100,000, the Accessories Prize to Sarah Levy with €100,000, and the Innovation Prize to Losanje
- 2026: ANDAM awards Marie Adam-Leenaerdt with a €300,000 endowment, the Special Prize to Pauline Dujancourt with €100,000, the Pierre Bergé Prize to Anthony Calydon with €100,000, the Accessories Prize to Philéo with €100,000, and the Innovation Prize to Alphalyr with €100,000

== Fellowship winners ==
| 1989 | Olivier Guillemin, Martin Margiela, Frédéric Molenac, Bridget Yorke |
| 1990 | Hélène Népomiatzi (31 Février), Franck-Joseph Bastille, Christophe Lemaire, Mariot Chanet (E2), Roelli Testu |
| 1991 | Jean Colonna, Véronique Leroy, José Lévy, Pascal Marais, Hervé Van Der Straeten |
| 1992 | Mahmoud Akram, Marie-Cécile Grossmann, Marthe Lagache, Jean Touitou (A.P.C.), Jft Yun |
| 1993 | Agathe Gonnet, Sami Tillouche |
| 1994 | Marc Le Bihan, Véronique Leroy, Viktor & Rolf, Bridget Yorke |
| 1995 | Adeline André, François-Marie Ascencio et Hélène Frain, Christophe Lemaire, Fred Sathal |
| 1996 | Lisa Astorino, Viviane Cazeneuve, Udo Edling, Cyd Jouny, Xuly Bët |
| 1997 | Shinichiro Arakawa, Elsa Esturgie, Erik Halley, Rodolphe Menudier, Darja Richter, Gilles Rosier |
| 1998 | Isabelle Ballu, Jerôme Dreyfuss, Sandrine Léonard, Benoît Méléard, Jeremy Scott, Gaspard Yurkievich |
| 1999 | Bless, Pascal Humbert, Dorothée Perret, Jean-François Pinto, Carrie Rossman, Patrick Van Ommeslaeghe |
| 2000 | Alexandre & Matthieu, Lutz Huelle, Vincent Rubin, Jeremy Scott, Andre Walker |
| 2001 | Carel & Rubio, Vava Dudu et Fabrice Lorrain, Erik Halley, Laurent Mercier, Yukie Otsuki, Goran Y Pejkoski |
| 2002 | Sébastien D. Rodriguez, Dragovan, Thomas Engel Hart, Lutz Huelle, Tom Van Lingen |
| 2003 | Alexandre & Matthieu, Anne Valérie Hash, Yvan Mispelaere, Felipe Oliveira Baptista, Vicente Rey, Yazbukey |
| 2004 | Charles Anastase, Bless |
| 2005 | Felipe Oliveira Baptista, Cathy Pill, Marie Seguy, Bernhard Willhelm, Yazbukey |
| 2006 | Natalia Brilli, Jens Laugesen, Christian Wijnants |
| 2007 | Commuun, Richard Nicoll, Bruno Pieters, Toga |
| 2008 | Gareth Pugh |
| 2009 | Giles Deacon, Ligia Dias |
| 2010 | Hakaan Yildirim |
| 2011 | Anthony Vaccarello, Yiqing Yin |
| 2012 | Julien David, Pièce d'Anarchive |
| 2013 | AMI, Christine Phung |
| 2014 | Iris Van Herpen, Coperni |
| 2015 | Stéphane Ashpool, Léa Peckre, Charlotte Chesnais |
| 2016 | Wanda Nylon, Atlein, Tomasini Paris |
| 2017 | Y/Project, AVOC, Ana Khouri, Euveka |
| 2018 | Atlein, Ludovic de Saint Sernin, D’Heygère, Colorifix |
| 2019 | Koché, Nicolas Lecourt Mansion, Khaoré, Worn Again Technologies |
| 2020 | Marine Serre, Y/Project, Mossi, Tekyn |
| 2021 | Bianca Saunders, Egon Lab, ASWAD, Spinnova |
| 2023 | LGN Louis-Gabriel Nouchi, Ester Manas, Duran Lantink, Avellano, Ruslan Baginskiy, SQIM |
| 2024 | Christopher Esber, 3. Paradis, Pièces Uniques, Maeden, Alternative Innovation |
| 2025 | Meryll Rogge, Alain Paul, Burc Akyol, Sarah Levy, Losanje |
| 2026 | Marie Adam-Leenaerdt, Pauline Dujancourt, Anthony Calydon, Philéo, Alphalyr |

== See also ==
- List of fashion awards
