= List of chics =

This is a list of notable chics (styles).

== Chics ==
=== Beach chic ===
"Beach chic" was the title of an article in 2006 by the Times fashion editor Lisa Armstrong about shopping for accessories to accompany a bikini. These included a "cover-up" (e.g. a kaftan), flat sandals, a hat, a fake tan and - with the comforting footnote, "No, you will not look like a WAG [wife or girlfriend of a footballer]" - denture cleaner to whiten finger-nails. The Sunday Times referred to the Moroccan resort of Essaouira as the "boho/barefoot-chic beach" (the latter possibly a play on the term, "bare-faced cheek").

=== Bisexual chic ===
A phrase used to describe the public acknowledgment of bisexuality or increased public interest or acceptance of bisexuality. Another usage describes a faddish attention towards bisexuality.

=== Boho-chic ===
Trend of fashion in the early 2000s (decade) which drew on earlier Bohemian and hippie styles. It was associated in particular with actress Sienna Miller and model Kate Moss. Mary-Kate and Ashley Olsen have both become icons for this style. Sometimes called "ashcan chic", particularly in reference to a style popular in the mid-2000s United States,

=== Bon chic bon genre ===
See Parisian chic

=== Camilla chic ===
Referring to the fashions of working class "chavs" who shared Camilla, Duchess of Cornwall's taste for Burberry check. Also known as chav chic or council house chic.

=== Casual chic ===
Casual chic (or chic casual) is a difficult term to define, but can perhaps best be described as "dressing down" in a stylish way. In 2007, the clothing retailer Marks & Spencer suggested that some of the elements of chic casual were skinny jeans, "longline, clingy jerseys", "statement" bags and chunky jewellery, slouchy sweaters and hoodies with comfortable flats. Singer Victoria Beckham was identified as epitomising this style. Easy chic ("breezy blouses, slouchy knits and sexy denim") has similar connotations.

=== Chekist chic ===
See Communist chic

=== Checkout chic ===
Referring to fashion ranges promoted by major supermarkets: "Tesco has stepped up its 'checkout chic' war with Asda by launching a design-led range of clothes to tempt female shoppers". Cheap chic was used in a similar sense, though more in terms of the comparison between prices at supermarkets and those of leading fashion houses: "You can achieve this season's look just by visiting your local supermarket".

=== Chelsea chic ===
Used by the Sunday Times ("The Sloane gets a sexy revamp") for fashionable trends among well-heeled "Sloane Rangers" (a portmanteau term coined in 1975 by Peter York, style editor of Harpers & Queen, from Sloane Square and the 1950s TV series The Lone Ranger) in the Chelsea area of south west London.

=== Communist chic ===
"Communist chic", or "Chekist chic" are elements of popular culture such as fashion and commodities based on communist symbols and other things associated with Communism. A typical example is T-shirts and other memorabilia with Alberto Korda's iconic photo of Che Guevara.

=== Eco chic ===
Eco chic means the use of eco-friendly textiles, such as organic cotton, silk and hemp, and also reconstructed clothing.

=== Gangster chic ===
Gangster chic varies from prohibition era gangsters such as fedoras etc and high ranking cartels.

=== Geek chic ===
"The look of a computer nerd".

=== Goth chic ===
Title of a "connoisseur's guide" by Gavin Baddeley (2002) to dark or Gothic culture. Among those associated with the "goth look" were the late 1970s punk band Siouxsie and the Banshees, American punk cabaret duo The Dresden Dolls, formed in 2000, and Betty Curse, described by The Times in 2006 as the "princess of Goth pop".

=== Heroin chic ===
Heroin chic was a look popularized in mid-1990s fashion and characterized by pale skin, dark circles underneath the eyes and angular bone structure. The look, characterised by emaciated features and androgyny, was a reaction against the healthy and vibrant look of models such as Cindy Crawford and Claudia Schiffer. A 1996 article in The Los Angeles Times opined that the fashion industry had "a nihilistic vision of beauty" that was reflective of drug addiction, while U.S. News & World Report called the movement a "cynical trend".

=== Hick chic ===
Hick chic" was the subject of an article in Country Life in 2006 by Carla Carlisle, American-born wife of former British Member of Parliament, Sir Kenneth Carlisle. Lady Carlisle cited a friend's description of the term: "it's farmers' markets, four-wheel drive cars, labradors, Harris Tweed, Shaker furniture, Emma Bridgewater [tableware] ...". "Hick" derives from "Old Hickory", a nickname for Andrew Jackson, US President 1829–37, a frontiersman who, like hickory wood, was known for his toughness.

=== High Street chic ===
Applied to the sort of "everyday" sense of style that might be spotted in any metropolitan or provincial setting; most likely to be associated with prevailing "shop window" fashions. In 2004 the Observer wrote of the singer Dido that "she drifts on stage dressed in high-street chic: faded denim and a tracksuit top, which she slips off to reveal a pink camisole vest". Samantha Cameron, wife of British Conservative Party leader and future Prime Minister David Cameron was described in 2006 as "spurn[ing] the designers ... for high street chic".

=== Hippie chic ===
Also known as Art-school chic and Talitha Getty chic

Broadly similar to boho-chic (see e.g. London Evening Standard Magazine, 11 March 2005), the Hippie chic was associated in the mid-1990s with Tom Ford's collections for the Italian house of Gucci and, indeed, various aspects of hippie fashion re-appeared periodically after the "Summer of Love" of 1967 when hippiedom and psychedelia were at their peak. Art-school chic had roughly similar connotations. Talitha Getty chic was applied by Hedley Freeman in the Guardian to the hippie style associated in the late 1960s (and since) with the actress wife (died 1971) of John Paul Getty. Talitha Getty is said to have inspired Ford's hippie-style creations.

=== Marzahn chic ===
Also known as Lichtenberg chic

Refers to the clothing style seen in some eastern and northern parts of Germany. It is composed of sweatpants or tracksuits, baseball caps and running shoes, commonly in bright colors like neon pink or yellow. The name originates from the locality Berlin-Marzahn where this style can frequently be seen. It also refers to the clothing style of Cindy aus Marzahn, a fictional character played by German comedian Ilka Bessin.

=== Military chic ===
Also known as Soldier chic

Adoption of military gear such as camouflage patterned clothing, war medals, military insignia, surplus clothing or dog tag necklaces into fashion.

The term and the similar soldier chic were widely applied c.2003-5, although in fact military apparel, such as the flight jackets worn by pilots during the Second World War, had frequently influenced fashion and paradoxically was often in vogue at times of anti-war feeling, such as in the late 1960s when protests against the Vietnam War were at their height (as, indeed, after the Iraq War of 2003):

"One would have thought, given the unpopularity of armed forces activity in some quarters, that 'military chic' would not be, well, chic".

=== Nazi chic ===
Nazi chic is the incorporation of Nazi style, clothing, and culture, often used for shock value or as a form of rebellion against the status quo. It is sometimes accompanied by a genuine sympathy for or adherence to the ideology of National Socialism.

=== Ninja chic ===
Ninja chic, or Samurai chic covers the style and clothing worn in Feudal Japan.

=== Northern chic ===
Occasionally applied retrospectively to aspects of the musical and cultural boom generated by rock group the Beatles, and other artists such as Gerry & The Pacemakers and Billy J. Kramer and the Dakotas in 1962–4 (the "Mersey Sound"). "Northern" is a reference both to Northern England (as also with "Northern soul") and Northern Songs, which published compositions by Beatles John Lennon and Paul McCartney.

=== Parisian chic ===
Also known as Bon chic bon genre

Frequently applied to anything stylish connected with the French capital Paris or to the style of French celebrities (e.g. actress Charlotte Gainsbourg or others living in Paris, such as the English actress Kristin Scott Thomas). Variants included "Left Bank" or "Right Bank" chic (or even "Left Bank chic versus Right Bank polish"). Gainsbourg's mother, the British-born actress Jane Birkin, remarked that she would choose "English eccentricity over Parisian chic every time", adding, "chic you can learn - it's just a form of grooming".

The term bon chic bon genre or BCBG ["good style, good class"] was applied in the early 1980s to the French equivalent of British "Sloane Rangers", their typical "uniform" including a mackintosh, ballet shoes, trousers, a cashmere sweater, and accessories such as a "Birkin bag" and a Cartier Tank Française wrist-watch. To a large extent, it refers to upper-class, or upper-middle-class, young men and women who are well-bred, or appear so, with good bones, slim bodies, and a sophisticated, but restrained and elegant, sense of style. In the U.S., the Ralph Lauren sense of style would be the equivalent.

=== Porn chic ===
"Porn chic" was first applied to films such as Deep Throat (1972) and Emmanuelle (1974) which were commercially successful and thus tended to bring "soft" pornography into the mainstream. Subsequently, it has been used to refer more generally to pornography in popular culture.

=== Prairie chic ===
Flat caps and floral dresses or aprons over jeans.

=== Radical chic ===
Also known as Terrorist chic

First coined by journalist Tom Wolfe in 1970, radical chic has since entered broad usage as a derogatory term for the pretentious adoption of radical causes by celebrities, socialites, and high society.

=== Rock-girl chic ===
"Rock-girl chic" has meant different things during differing periods of music and fashion, but was often associated with a hippie image and was similar enough as a phrase to the slightly patronising "rock chick" to convey a sense of being a "groupie". This and similar terms, such as "boho-rock" (2006), were often applied to model Kate Moss, about whom Rebecca Ley from Times Online wrote that "Kate veers effortlessly between rock-girl chic and dripping-in-diamonds elegance". Moss's relationship in 2005–7 with Pete Doherty of the group Babyshambles tended to emphasise the tag.

=== Rural chic ===
Applied by the Sunday Times to a fashion collection designed and modelled by Savannah Miller, Cotswold-based sister of actress and 2000s (decade) "boho-queen" Sienna Miller, for the Hong Kong based label Shanghai Tang.

=== Shabby chic ===
The deliberate use of worn and shabby materials in interior design or fashion. The effect of limewashing timber-framed buildings has been described as "shabby chic".

=== Soldier chic ===
See Military chic

=== Talitha Getty ===
See Hippie chic

=== Terrorist chic ===
See Radical chic

=== Tropical chic ===
Tropical and beach themed home accents that are influenced by island styles and tropical designs. Tropical chic style includes modern appointments, yet casual island style living.
