= Christopher Esber =

Australian fashion designer (born 1987)

- Born: 1987 (age 38–39); Auburn, New South Wales, Australia
- Education: Fashion Design Studio, TAFE NSW
- Label: Christopher Esber
- Awards: Grand Prize, ANDAM Fashion Award (2024)
- Website: christopheresber.com

Christopher Esber (born 1987) is an Australian fashion designer, the founder and designer of his eponymous womenswear label, based in Sydney. The label is known for deconstructed tailoring and sculptural silhouettes. He founded the label in 2010 and first showed at Australian Fashion Week the same year; since 2023 he has shown on the official Paris Fashion Week calendar. In 2024, he became the first Australian to win the Grand Prize of the ANDAM Fashion Award.

== Early life and education ==
Esber was born in 1987 at Auburn Hospital in Sydney's western suburbs, the youngest of three children of Lebanese immigrants, both teachers, who had moved to Australia in 1980; the family later settled in nearby Merrylands. He has described himself as a quiet child who was often "in his own world", and by the age of nine an aunt who had worked as a seamstress had taught him to sew and cut patterns. He completed his Higher School Certificate at Our Lady of Lebanon College in Harris Park in 2005. He went on to study at the Fashion Design Studio at TAFE NSW, graduating in 2008 in the same class as Dion Lee; his mentor Nicholas Huxley selected him to present his graduate collection at the 2008 Rosemount Australian Fashion Week. Before starting his label, he trained for twelve months with a tailor.

== Career ==
=== Founding the label ===
In 2010, aged 22, Esber founded the label with a small loan from his parents and made his solo debut at Australian Fashion Week the same year. The debut caught the attention of Sydney retailer Belinda Seper, who began stocking the label at her boutique The Corner Shop. In January 2012, Esber presented in New York as one of the Australian Five, an emerging-designer event at the Crosby Street Hotel organized by the Woolmark Company with the Australians in New York Fashion Foundation around that year's G'Day USA program. Two months later he won the L'Oréal National Designer Award at the Melbourne Fashion Festival.

=== International expansion ===
In July 2013, Esber won the Australian regional final of the International Woolmark Prize with a six-piece merino wool collection; the win, announced at the Sydney Theatre Company, carried a A$50,000 prize. He represented Australia at the international final in Milan in February 2014, where the prize went to India's Rahul Mishra. He won the emerging designer award at the 2014 Australian Fashion Laureate, and in 2015 Vogue Italia named him its Most Talented Designer for Australia-Pacific. In February 2017, he presented his Fall/Winter 2017 collection at New York Fashion Week.

Esber has traced the label's international breakthrough to 2019, when a request came in for a dress for Zendaya and he pedaled across Paris to deliver it. Stylists Karla Welch and Law Roach began placing the label with their clients around this time. In 2022, Megan Fox announced her engagement on Instagram wearing the label's Interweave Wire Bandeau Dress; Adwoa Aboah wore its Warped Sequin Venus Dress to the 2022 Vanity Fair Oscar Party; and in January 2024 Jennifer Lopez appeared in the Salacia Wire Column Dress in the cover art for the vinyl release of This Is Me... Now. The label joined the Net-a-Porter roster in 2020, and in 2023 it produced a bridal capsule for the retailer before launching eyewear with its Resort 2024 collection; shoes had arrived in 2019 and handbags followed in 2024. Between 2021 and 2024, annual revenue grew 86 percent and annual sales reached eight figures. By 2025, the label sold through more than 130 stockists in 46 countries and employed a team of 35, most of them in Australia.

=== Paris Fashion Week ===
For about a decade before his on-schedule debut, Esber sold the label's collections in Paris through market showrooms. In August 2023, the label announced it had been invited by the Fédération de la Haute Couture et de la Mode to join the official calendar. Esber made his on-schedule debut on September 28, 2023, with the Spring 2024 collection; he was one of a small number of Australian designers to show on the Paris calendar. Reviewing the show for Vogue, Tina Isaac-Goizé noted his taste for negative space, a draped white bodice anchored by an elliptic stone, handmade latticed-crystal tops and pieces made from Amazonian leaves, and wrote that he was "at his best when he sticks to sophistication with just a dash of disruption". Two weeks later, on October 12, 2023, he was named Designer of the Year at the 2023 Australian Fashion Laureate, at a ceremony at the Sydney Opera House.

=== ANDAM Grand Prize ===
On June 27, 2024, Esber won the Grand Prize of the 35th ANDAM Fashion Award in Paris, at the time having recently expanded the label into swim and jewelry. The prize carried a €300,000 grant and a year of mentoring from the 2024 jury president Anthony Vaccarello, the creative director of Saint Laurent and himself the 2011 winner. Esber, who had presented to the jury alongside fellow finalists Meryll Rogge, Marie Adam-Leenaerdt, Ruohan and Charles Jeffrey Loverboy, was the first Australian to be nominated for the prize and the first to win it. The win came with a mandate to open an office in Paris; Esber said his first order of business back in Sydney would be French lessons.

Since the win, the label has worked more closely with specialist workshops in Paris and, after sustainability advice from OTB, began building a denim line made with traceable Australian cotton. It has continued to show in Paris: the Fall 2025 collection, presented on March 10, 2025, was its first full runway show there after earlier presentation-format seasons, on a day's schedule alongside Rick Owens, Schiaparelli, Chloé and Off-White. On October 7, 2025, the Spring 2026 show closed out Paris Fashion Week at the Australian Embassy, deconstructing office wear around ideas of the beach, with trousers covered in fish scales dyed to resemble sequins and trims of salmon skin. For Fall 2026, presented in a Paris showroom in March 2026, Esber took inspiration from the 1996 film Crash, and said he would return to the Paris runway that September. He was added to the BoF 500 in 2024.

=== Retail ===
The label opened its first store on December 4, 2024, a pop-up in Sydney's heritage-listed Strand Arcade that ran through March 2025, carrying the Resort 2025 collection alongside swim, shoes, handbags and sunglasses. At the time, wholesale accounted for 65 percent of sales, through stockists including Mytheresa, Neiman Marcus, Moda Operandi, Galeries Lafayette and Harrods, with Europe generating 36 percent of sales and the United States 32 percent. Esber has described the pop-up as the first step in a retail expansion strategy, with the goal of opening stores over the following five to ten years. In 2025, he said he had also decided to design menswear for the first time.

== Design approach ==
Esber's designs pair deconstructed tailoring with draped, fluid silhouettes, with cutouts and metal detailing as recurring elements. Other recurring devices have included metal corsetry and buttons made with crushed ceramic. He has described his process as subtracting, deconstructing and reconstructing a garment "to arrive at the purest version of a concept", working with negative space and cutouts "to create this new idea of relaxed glamor". "I've always had this idea of women in the office daydreaming of a holiday or escape," he has said. "Mixing ideas of office wear and beach culture has always been an interesting tension for me." He has said he designs "for a woman who loves fashion, but she is not willing to surrender herself to it". Lauren Sams of the Australian Financial Review has described his pieces, with their handmade hardware and metal corsetry, as "part clothing, part sculpture". Esber has said he looks up to Nicolas Ghesquière's work for Balenciaga and to Miuccia Prada.
