= Reconstructed clothing =

Clothing item redesigned into a new garment

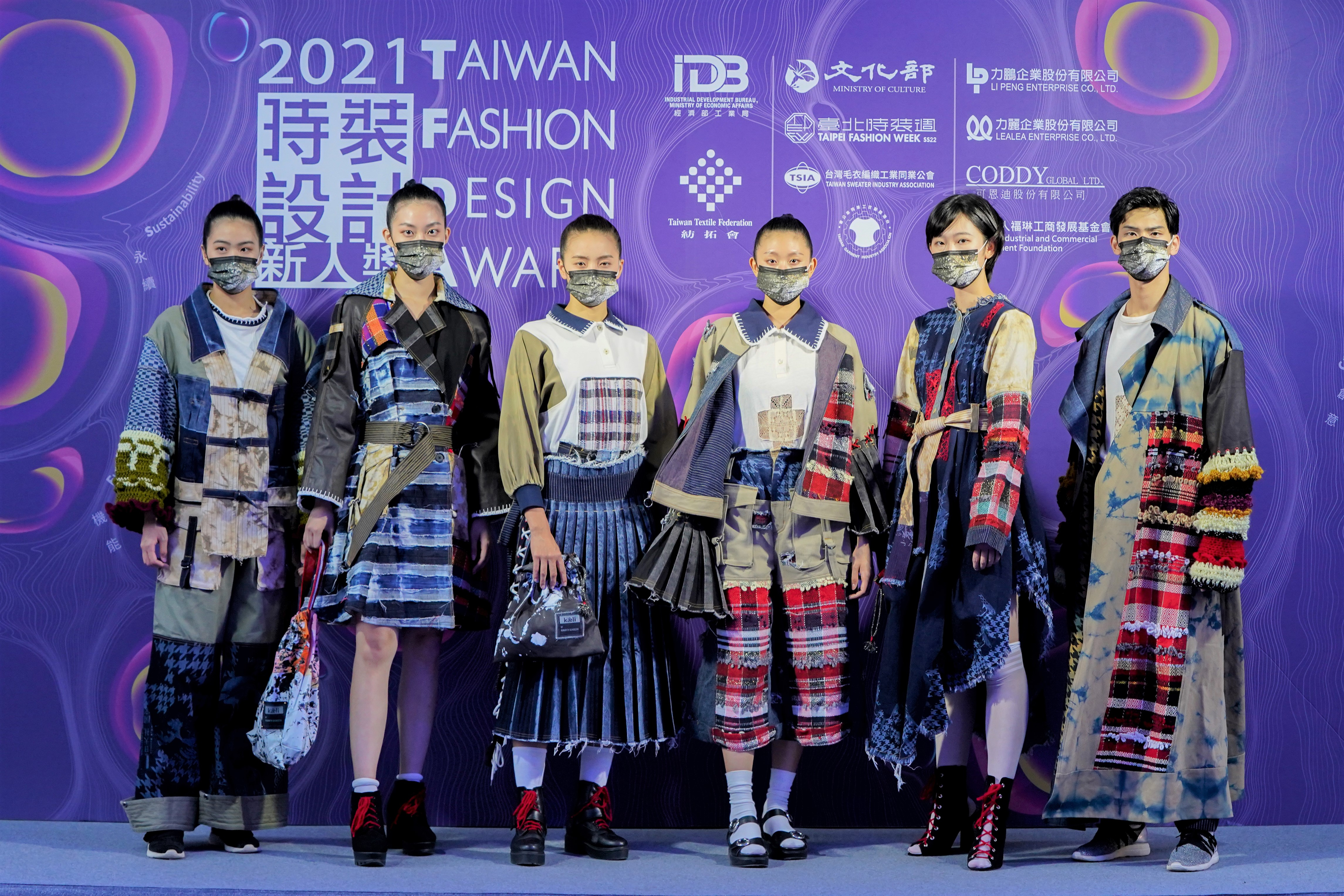
Reconstructed clothing at a fashion show.

Reconstructed clothing is used or vintage clothing that has been redesigned and resewn into a new garment. Reconstructed clothing falls under the umbrella of upcycling, as it adds value to discarded clothes through transformation. There are records of this practice being in use since the 1700s, mainly in women's clothing. This technique was primarily used for necessity, but shifted into being fashionable in the 1970s and then with a focus on the environment in the 1990s. In the twenty-first century, both minor initiatives and major brands have begun to push for more sustainability in fashion.

Reconstructed clothing has a large environmental impact on the fashion industry. By reusing previously created clothing, this act of transformation reduces clothing waste as well as prevents the pollution that would have been made in the process of making a new item of clothing.

== History ==
=== Eighteenth century ===
In the eighteenth century, women's dresses in England would often be sewn in a way where the stitches could be easily removed in order to repurpose the clothing when a new style of dress was needed. This was because of the large amount of fabric needed to make a dress, as well as the high cost of the textile.

=== Nineteenth century ===
The trend continued into the nineteenth century, with well-known household manuals such as Mrs. Beeton's Book of Household Management, helping reconstructed clothing become more mainstream through their emphasis on frugality. A popular use of reconstructed clothing was using the silk gowns of the eighteenth century. Another example involved shawls, a popular accessory in the early 1800s, but after going out of style, were used for reconstruction. The specific method used was called "turning" and called for flipping the shawl fabric so the inside was then facing out. This trend did not just apply to women's but also men's clothing.

=== Twentieth century ===
Throughout the 1900s, reconstructed clothing entered a trend cycle of decreased popularity followed by an uptick in users. These spikes specifically occurred during times of hardship, such as the Great Depression and World War II, where reconstructed clothing would be brought in as a helpful strategy to conserve money while still maintaining aesthetics. This can be seen by the book, Dyeing, Remodeling, Budgets published by the Women's Institute of Domestic Arts and Sciences in 1931 as well as the Make Do and Mend campaign, both of which provided tips for maintaining and altering clothing.

The 1960s and 70s represented a shift in the meaning behind reconstructed clothing. Instead of the act of altering being done for convenience, reconstructed clothing was now viewed as stylish by a younger audience. So much so that department stores began adding sections dedicated to both secondhand and reconstructed clothes.

As the end of the twentieth century approached, the meaning behind reconstructed clothing changed again. Users began to see past the aesthetic impact and towards the potential environmental benefits behind clothing reconstruction.

== Contemporary examples ==
In the twenty-first century, reconstructed clothing has again resurfaced. During this first wave of trend in the mid-2000s, Generation T (2006), which gave instructions for "108 Ways to Transform a T-Shirt," was published. The book included instructions for how to make halter tops, A-line skirts, and string bikinis out of T-shirts. In 2008, Nicolay released another book entitled Generation T: Beyond Fashion 120 More Ways to Transform Your T's. This book had a bigger variety of projects including ones for children, men, and even pets.

In March 2006, the DIY group Compai released their first DIY clothing reconstruction book, 99 Ways to Cut, Sew, Trim, and Tie Your T-shirt Into Something Fabulous! After this book's release, Compai went on to release three more books about reconstructing jeans, sweaters and scarves.

Towards the latter half of the 2010s, reconstructed clothing gained traction in high fashion circles, with brands like RE/DONE and Vetements leading the way in popularizing jeans crafted from vintage denim. Marine Serre, winner of the 2017 LVMH prize for young designers, pledges that a minimum of 50% of her collections consist of reconstructed clothing. New York brand BODE has from its 2016 inception focused on pieces reconstructed from vintage or antique textiles such as quilts, tablecloths, lace doilies, and oven mitts.

Maison Margiela is another brand known for its commitment to reconstruction. It is a Parisian brand created in 1988 by Martin Margiela, who strove to create haute-couture fashion through discarded things, such as fabric, trash, or other clothes. Notably, Maison Margiela's 1993 Spring collection featured designs fashioned from deadstock theatre costumes, transforming what was to be scrapped into unique clothing items.

Another luxury clothing brand which works in reconstruction is XULY.Bët. Started by Lamine Badian Kouyaté in 1991, he brought in the ideas of recycling instilled in him by his mother and grandmother growing up in Mali. They taught him to repurpose fabrics and old clothes and he has continued that vision through the work of XULY.Bët.

This shift towards sustainability can be seen in countries such as Vietnam, whose high exports in the clothing industry have led to both economic growth and environmental dangers. This push is headed by Generation-Z, as they have begun prioritizing sustainable practices such as repurposed clothing over fast fashion.

== Environmental impact ==
Reconstructed clothing has positive impacts on environmental sustainability in the fashion industry. It helps reduce waste and the amount of product used by reusing existing textiles and garments rather than manufacturing new ones. An academic analysis completed in 2023 conveyed that sustainable clothing practices, like clothing reconstruction, are being researched more, and becoming more popular over the years. Ultimately the methods being used are aiming to lower the amount of resources that are being used while reducing greenhouse gas emissions.

The fashion industry is one of the highest producers of carbon, making up 10% of global carbon emissions. The industry also produces 20% of global water waste and over 92 million tons of textile waste annually through its processes. By using vintage clothing as the basis for new designs, reconstructed clothing does not have the same effect on the environment as fast fashion or new creations.
