= Bruno Pieters =

Belgian fashion designer

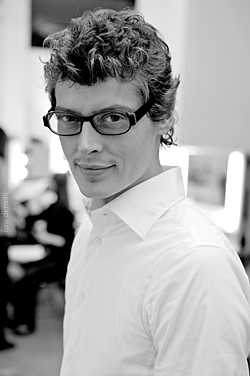
- Pieters backstage in a Hugo Boss fashion show in Berlin in 2008
- Born: 17 June 1975 (age 50); Bruges, Belgium

Bruno Pieters (born 17 June 1975 in Bruges, Belgium) is a Belgian fashion designer based in Antwerp. He studied at the Royal Academy of Fine Arts in Antwerp graduating with a BA in Fashion Design in 1999. Pieters is highly regarded for his avant-garde creations and sharp tailoring. He worked with designers including Martin Margiela, Josephus Thimister and Christian Lacroix to develop his talent. After a two-year break, he introduced his comeback label Honest By Bruno Pieters in 2012.

== Life and career ==
Two years after his graduation in 1999, Bruno Pieters launched his first collection in July 2001 during Paris Fashion Week. The next year, he introduced his ready-to-wear collection for both male and female. Praised by Vogue international editor, fashion journalist Suzy Menkes and other fashion critics, his career took flight. As a result, in 2005 Pieters was named creative director of the men’s line at the Belgian brand Delvaux, the oldest fine leather luxury goods company in the world. After fulfilling this position for two years, in 2007, he was asked to become creative director of the avant-garde line HUGO by the German brand Hugo Boss.

During his time as art director for Delvaux and Hugo Boss, Pieters was still working on his own name label. He can be seen as a technician, a constructor, one who experiments with profiles and proportions. One of the features of his work is the combination of perfect cuts and homage to craftsmanship. The autumn/winter collection of 2009-2010 proves this feature, focusing on geometrically constructed skirts, dresses and hooded jackets. In addition, his spring/summer collection of 2010 explored a new form of the bandage dress, gently wrapped around the body in constructed geometric diagonal layers. After launching the spring/summer collection of 2010, Pieters decided to take a break from his fashion career. In that same year, he ended the collaboration with Hugo Boss. As a result, much of his collection archive was given to the MoMu Fashion museum of Antwerp, while the rest was sold to give the funds to SISP, a children’s charity in Southern India. The choice for this charity was no coincidence, as Pieters spent his break from the fashion industry mainly in India. Simultaneously, his experiences in India emerged awareness and the need to create a new model for the fashion industry. This resulted in his comeback label Honest By Bruno Pieters in 2012.

== Current label ==
=== Honest By ===
Confronted by the injustice of the supply chain and the poor working conditions in countries such as India, Bruno Pieters wants to focus on sustainable fashion and transparency. His new innovative label Honest By is avant-garde, luxury fashion that is mostly sustainable, mostly organic and financially transparent. In addition, twenty per cent of the profit of his label goes to charity. The sustainability is featured in the use of mainly organic, natural and animal friendly materials. Bruno Pieters also wants to make his design sustainable by producing something you can wear and enjoy more than just one season, a collection designed to last. For example, his autumn/winter collection of 2012-2013 is a reinvention of classics such as the trench coat, the bomber jacket and jeans. Pieters deconstructs and reconstructs existing fashion classics to make them into something new but still classical, introducing the term neo-classic hybrids.

Furthermore, Honest By shows people where the materials come from, how much they cost, who made the product, where it was made and how much money everybody earns along the supply chain. As a result of this 100% transparency, Bruno Pieters wants to make consumers aware and critical about where clothes come from and how they are produced. He also emphasises the influence consumers can have on clothing companies if they ask questions and express their demands.

In his vision to change the model of the fashion industry, making it more sustainable and transparent, Bruno Pieters has launched the Future Fashion Designer Scholarship for upcoming designers. The aim of the FFDS is to give fashion design students the opportunity to develop their graduation collection in a responsible, sustainable and transparent manner. The winner of the FFDS receives 10.000 euros cash and guidance from Bruno Pieters himself to make his or her debut as a fashion designer.

== Awards ==
- The Swiss Textile Award in 2006
- The ANDAM Award from the Pierre Berge and Yves Saint Laurent Foundation in 2007
- The Elle Style Awards in 2008
- The H&M Conscious Designer Award in 2014
