= La Cambre =

Higher arts educational institution in Brussels

Coordinates: 50°49′04″N 4°22′31″E

L'École nationale supérieure des arts visuels de La Cambre (ENSAV), more known as La Cambre, is a renowned visual arts school founded by Henry van de Velde in Brussels in 1926.

It was founded as the Institut supérieur des Arts décoratifs (Hoger Instituut voor Decoratieve Kunsten), and became known as "La Cambre" after the Abbey of la Cambre/Ter Kameren in which premises it was established.

In 1980, La Cambre was divided into two separate institutions, the École nationale supérieure des Arts visuels (ENSAV), and the Institut supérieur d'Architecture de la Communauté française de Belgique (ISACF). Both institutions belong to the French Community of Belgium. ENSAV is still housed at the abbey while the ISACF stopped existing in 2009, when all architecture schools integrated universities, and the ISACF merged with two other institutes into the Université libre de Bruxelles.

Notable alumni include Pierre Alechinsky, Marine Serre, Berthe Dubail, Harold Ancart, Olivier Strebelle, Anthony Vaccarello, Louis-Gabriel Nouchi, Ester Manas and Lucien Kroll. Notable faculty have included Elisabeth de Saedeleer.
