= Y/Project =

French fashion label

Y/Project (stylised Y/PROJECT) was a Paris-based fashion label founded in 2010 by French designer Yohan Serfaty and businessman Gilles Elalouf. The brand became known for its avant-garde tailoring and gender-fluid approach to dressing, particularly under the creative direction of Belgian designer Glenn Martens.

== History ==
Y/Project was launched in 2010 by Serfaty and Elalouf as an avant-garde menswear project. Serfaty's early collections were characterised by elongated, architectural silhouettes and sombre outerwear with a distinctly dark, dystopian mood.

After Serfaty's death from cancer in 2013, Elalouf appointed Belgian designer Glenn Martens—who had been Serfaty's first assistant—as creative director. Under Martens, Y/Project expanded into womenswear and became known for its experimental, deconstructed constructions and gender-fluid reinterpretations of wardrobe staples.

Y/Project was a finalist for the LVMH Prize in 2016 and won the ANDAM Prize in 2017.

In January 2018, Y/Project presented a collaboration with UGG during Paris Fashion Week Men's. The collection reinterpreted UGG's sheepskin boots with exaggerated proportions and slouching layers, including versions extending to the upper thigh. The designs were shown on both male and female models. For autumn/winter 2020, the label collaborated with Canada Goose on a six-piece capsule collection comprising parkas, sweaters and beanies.

In July 2020, alongside its spring/summer 2021 collection, Y/Project introduced Evergreen, a permanent collection initially comprising 16 designs drawn from the label's earlier work. The pieces were intended to remain available across seasons without seasonal markdowns, with further designs added over time. Martens described the initiative as an effort to improve the environmental impact of the brand's materials, production, packaging and shipping.

Y/Project also collaborated with Jean Paul Gaultier on clothing incorporating trompe-l'œil body prints derived from Gaultier's 1995 designs. Other partnerships included a spring/summer 2022 collection with Fila, autumn/winter 2021 footwear with Melissa, and a reinterpretation of Salomon's Speedcross 3 shoe.

In March 2024, Y/Project released its autumn/winter 2024 lookbook in place of a scheduled Paris Fashion Week show. Marking ten years of Glenn Martens's creative direction, it featured Ye, Mia Khalifa, Charli XCX and Irina Shayk, among others.

In September 2024, Martens stepped down as creative director of Y/Project after more than a decade in the role. Following Elalouf's death in 2024 and the subsequent departure of Martens, the company entered court-supervised receivership and failed to secure a buyer. In January 2025 the label announced that it would cease operations after fourteen years, citing financial difficulties and the inability to complete a sale of the business.

== Style and influence ==
Under Martens, Y/Project developed a distinctive approach to Parisian dressing, using exaggerated proportions, twisted denim and garments designed to be worn in multiple ways. Critics highlighted the label's trompe-l'œil denim, hybrid constructions and gender-fluid styling as examples of a shift towards more eccentric, experimental dressing in luxury fashion. In a farewell piece, British Vogue described Y/Project as a small but influential brand that proved to fashion that “bonkers is best”, crediting its silhouettes with changing how fashion fans think about clothing. Later assessments have connected the brand's deconstructed, multi-way pieces to an early-2020s trend for Y2K nostalgia and meme-ready silhouettes for social media.

The Palais Galliera collection includes a pair of thigh-high boots from Y/Project's autumn/winter 2018–2019 collaboration with UGG, donated by the brand in May 2020.
