= Berthe Dubail =

Belgian painter (1911–1984)

- Born: 1911; Leval-Trahégnies
- Died: 1984 (aged 72–73)
- Education: La Cambre
- Known for: Painting, Teaching
- Movement: Expressionism, Abstract expressionism
- Awards: Order of Leopold II, Order of the Crown (Belgium)

Berthe Dubail (1911-1984) born in Leval-Trahégnies near Binche was a Belgian painter.

== Biography ==
Berthe Dubail studied at the Royal Academy of Fine Arts in Mons, and at the workshop of La Cambre in Brussels dedicated to monumental painting, she further worked in Paris, at the Académie de la Grande Chaumière in the free workshops.
In parallel to her artistic research, she became a professor in Mons and then in Brussels, and developed a new method of teaching that awakened and respected the spontaneity and spirit of discovery of the student. After an early expressionist and figurative period from 1945 to 1956, she turned to a more abstract style.

== Collections ==
- Royal Museums of Fine Arts of Belgium
- Museum of Fine Arts, Charleroi
- Mu.ZEE, in Ostend

== Honors ==
- Order of Leopold II, 1956,
- Order of the Crown (Belgium), 1979,
- A street is named after the artist in Leval-Trahegnies

== Bibliography ==
- De Heusch, S. Goyens; Berthe Dubail, Catalogue Raisonné de L'Œuvre de l'artiste
- Serge Goyens de Heusch; Philippe Roberts-Jones; Fondation pour l'art belge contemporain (Brussels), Berthe Dubail, 1991
