= Michaela Stark =

Australian artist and fashion designer (born 1994)

Michaela Stark (born 1994) is an Australian artist, corsetier, model and body diversity advocate based in London. She is known for her custom-made, body-distorting lingerie pieces which straddle the border of art and fashion.

Stark plays with the contrast of delicate materials such as silk, taffeta, muslin, tulle, ribbons, pearls, contrasted against tight, asymmetrical corsets which reshape the body, highlighting bulges and curves. Her looks often reflect the discomfort she felt with her body and clothing as an adolescent.

== Early life and education ==
Stark was born in Brisbane, Australia, in 1994. She became interested in fashion as a teenager, but also suffered from dysmorphia.

She earned a degree in fashion design from Queensland University of Technology and completed an exchange at a design school in Milan. One of her teachers offered Stark a three-month internship at the Paris showroom of fashion agent Florence Deschamp. Upon her return to Brisbane, she was determined to return to Europe and in 2017 she moved to London and started an internship with multidisciplinary artist Claire Barrow. Over the next six months, she moved between the studios of several emerging London fashion talents.

== Career ==
In 2018, Stark designed a custom piece for Beyoncé which appeared in the singer's music video for "Apeshit". She subsequently designed another costume for Beyoncé's 2020 Black Is King musical film. The endorsement of the superstar singer proved to be a great boost to Stark's career.

In 2023, Stark was invited to join a group of other artists in reimagining the Victoria's Secret Fashion Show, which had been canceled since 2019. She constructed couture looks for herself and two other plus-size models: Jade O'Belle and Ceval. Presenting the most avant garde looks in the filmed fashion show, some fans reacted negatively and organized a campaign of harassment during which she lost access to her social media accounts for some time.

That same year, she walked in the spring/summer show for Weinsanto in Paris, and launched her own line of ready-to-wear lingerie. She presented the collection, branded Panty, at Milan Fashion Week.

In 2024 she performed at the Tate Britain as part of the Sargent and Fashion show. Stark posed for hours in her signature tight-fitting lingerie, tangled in veil-like fabric, inside a crate meant to mimic the display boxes used in the exhibit. The next year, her work was showcased, along with that of two other Brisbane artists, at the Institute of Modern Art in a show titled Confronting Femininity. In 2026, several of Stark's pieces were featured in the New York Metropolitan Museum's annual Costume Institute exhibit, and custom mannequins were constructed from scans of her body. ArtNet identified her "Fat, not Fertile" piece as one of the "standouts" of the Costume Art show.
