= Ganni =

Danish clothing company

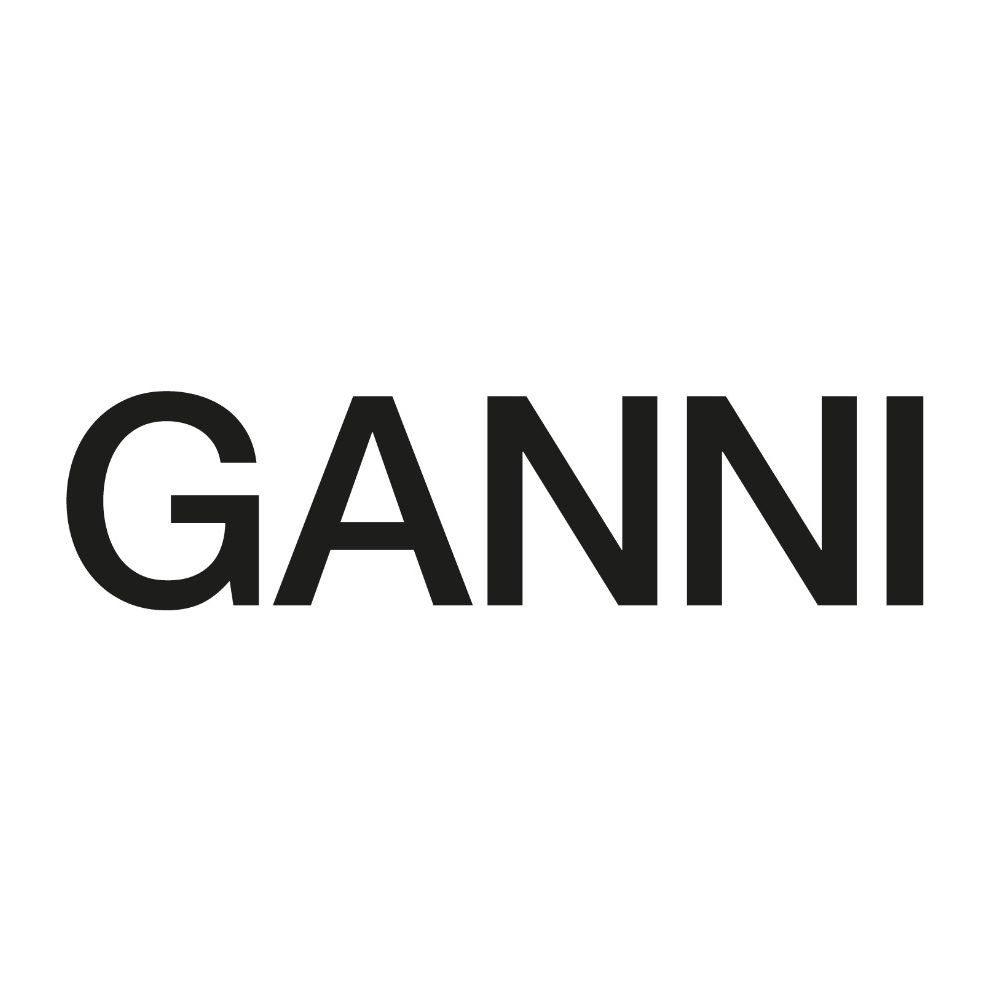
- Product type: Clothing, Shoes & Accessories
- Current owner: L Catterton (51%), Ditte Reffstrup, Nikolaj Reffstrup
- Country: Copenhagen, Denmark
- Introduced: 2000
- Website: www.ganni.com

Ganni is a Danish contemporary ready-to-wear fashion brand. Founded in 2000 by gallerist Frans Truelsen, it gained recognition as a designer label in the late 2010s under the leadership of Nicolaj and Ditte Reffstrup. The company's main fashion house focuses on ready-to-wear T-shirt, pants, silhouettes, elasticized straps, waistbands, and ruching. Ganni has multiple outlets spread in and around Copenhagen, and 25 stores in the US. Ganni counts 453 employees worldwide.

== History ==
Ganni was founded by Frans Truelsen as a line of cashmere apparel in 2000. In 2009, the Reffstrups took over the company with Ditte Reffstrup serving as creative director and Nicolaj Reffstrup as CEO. Ditte Reffstrup started her career as a clothes buyer for Danish and Parisian brands. Nicolaj Reffstrup, who graduated from Copenhagen Business School and earned his master's degree at IT University of Copenhagen, is a former technology entrepreneur. Private equity firm L Catterton acquired a 51% stake in the company in 2017. In 2024, former deputy CEO of Balenciaga, Laura du Rusquec was appointed CEO.

Harper's Bazaar described Ganni as positioned between fast-fashion retail and haute couture. Ganni is one of the top 20 best-selling brands on Net-a-Porter. By 2017, the brand's annual revenue was £35 million, and as of 2019 it was £75 million.

== Marketing ==
In 2019, the brand launched a Denmark-wide initiative called Ganni Repeat in which garments could be rented in Copenhagen for up to three weeks at a time. At Copenhagen Fashion Week in 2020, Ganni announced an expansion of Ganni Repeat to Europe and the United States in partnership with Levi's. Entitled "Love Letter," the rental-only joint collection consists of upcycled denim pieces. Ganni has collaborated with various creative-industry partners on limited-edition collections. Some examples include a range of jackets, a coat and a vest, with Icelandic 66 ° North, an outdoor clothing brand. Footwear collection with Diemme, a shoe making brand. An upcycled collection designed with Ahluwalia, a menswear design.

In June 2023, Ganni released a ten-piece size-inclusive summer capsule with the Brussels-based label Ester Manas, sized EU 32 to 52. In April 2024, Ganni collaborated with Paloma Elsesser on a size-inclusive capsule collection available in EU sizes 32–52.

Ganni has a podcast where host Marjon Carlos speaks to different creative artists about their interests, life and activities.
