= Rahul Mishra =

Indian fashion designer based in Delhi (born 1979)

- Born: 7 November 1979 (age 46); Malhausi, Kanpur, India
- Education: Chhatrapati Shahu Ji Maharaj University, Kanpur; National Institute of Design, Ahmedabad; Istituto Marangoni, Milan
- Occupation: Fashion designer
- Awards: 2014 International Woolmark Prize
- Website: www.rahulmishra.in

Rahul Mishra (born 7 November 1979) is an Indian fashion designer based in Delhi. He is the first Indian designer to be invited to showcase at the Haute Couture Week in Paris. He won the International Woolmark Prize in 2014 at Milan Fashion Week, becoming the first Indian designer to win the award. The winning collection was sold in stores around the world.

In 2008, he was awarded the MTV Youth Icon of the Year by MTV India.

== Early life and background ==
Mishra grew up in Malhausi, a sleepy village 53 miles off Kanpur. He spent his childhood with his grandparents, listening to an array of stories- religious, historical, moral, of balance and humanity. He did his graduate degree in physics from Kanpur University (now known as Chhatrapati Shahu Ji Maharaj University). This was followed by post graduation in apparel design from the National Institute of Design (NID), Ahmedabad, where he won the Best Student Designer Of The Year in 2005.

In 2009, he became the first non-European designer to win a scholarship at Istituto Marangoni, Milan, Italy.

His wife Divya, also an NID graduate in apparel design, works with him.

== Career ==
He made his debut in 2006 at Lakme Fashion Week with a collection using cotton handloom textiles from Kerala, especially off-white fabric with golden border of Kerala mundu. In 2009, he made reversible dresses, employing Kerala mundu on one side, with Banarasi fabric of the other side woven by traditional craftmen.

Mishra has showcased his work at fashion weeks in London, Dubai, Australia and is regular on the official calendar of Paris Fashion Week. He has also become known for incorporating traditional Indian textiles, and handmade artisanship to his work. He is the only Indian designer to be chosen by Rent the Runway, online rental boutique.

In 2013, he won the Indian leg of the International Woolmark Prize, thus going on to represent India and the Middle East at the 2014 International Woolmark Prize Competition in Milan. The five contenders included Christopher Esber representing Australia, Sibling for Europe, ffiXXed for Asia and Joseph Altuzarra for the Americas. Mishra's award-winning capsule range, "The Lotus Effect" was based on the hexagon shapes and Lotus motifs. The collection incorporated Chanderi fabric woven with 85% Merino wool with woollen zardozi embroidery by craftsmen in Kolkata. The collection was influenced by the monochromatic work of Dutch graphic artist Maurits Cornelis Escher. In February 2014, Rahul Mishra won the 2014 Woolmark Prize at Milan Fashion Week. The award carries an AUS $100,000 prize and was previously won by designers Karl Lagerfield, Giorgio Armani and Yves Saint Laurent, Mishra was the only Indian to have won the award.
