= Ester Manas =

French fashion designer (born 1992)

- Born: 1992 (age 33–34); Toulouse, France
- Education: La Cambre
- Label: Ester Manas
- Awards: Galeries Lafayette Prize, Hyères Festival (2018); Semifinalist, LVMH Prize (2020); Special Prize, ANDAM (2023)
- Website: estermanas.com

Ester Manas (born 1992) is a French fashion designer based in Brussels. With her husband Balthazar Delepierre, she co-founded the womenswear label Ester Manas in 2019. The label produces most of its garments in a single size meant to fit a range of bodies, and casts its runway shows accordingly. Manas won the Galeries Lafayette Prize at the 2018 International Festival of Fashion and Photography in Hyères, was a semifinalist for the 2020 LVMH Prize, and shared the Special Prize of the 2023 ANDAM Fashion Award with Duran Lantink. A dress from the label's spring 2022 collection entered the collection of the Metropolitan Museum of Art's Costume Institute in 2023.

== Early life and education ==
Manas was born in 1992 and grew up in Toulouse, France. After high school she spent a preparatory year at the Atelier de Sèvres in Paris, where she began knitting three-dimensional forms that drew her toward fashion, and then moved to Brussels at 18 to attend La Cambre. She enrolled at La Cambre as a graphic design student and switched to the fashion program after a year. Her entrance project for the school was a magazine titled BIG, about the industry's fixation on thinness; as a student who wore a French size 44, she found that premium and luxury brands generally stopped at a size 40. She paid for her studies with bank loans, and during her years at La Cambre she interned at Annemie Verbeke, Balenciaga, Paco Rabanne, and Acne Studios.

For her graduate collection, "Big Again", Manas made custom garments for twelve women with different body types to understand their fitting problems, and, because the school had no large-size mannequins, she also fitted the clothes on her own body. At La Cambre she met Delepierre, a Belgian typography student who moved into fashion design; the two became a couple, and they married in 2023.

== Career ==
=== Founding the label ===
In 2018, Manas showed "Big Again" at the International Festival of Fashion and Photography in Hyères, where she won the Galeries Lafayette Prize. The prize led to "Fashion for All", a capsule of adjustable dresses, tops, and trench coats spanning European sizes 34 to 50, which Galeries Lafayette sold in spring 2019. Manas and Delepierre founded their label in Brussels later that year, producing locally with Mulieris, a workshop that employs women on back-to-work schemes. Printemps was the first department store to stock the label.

=== Paris Fashion Week ===
The label joined the official Paris Fashion Week calendar with a digital presentation of its spring 2021 collection, "Superhuman", one of ten brands debuting that season; the same year it signed with the business accelerator Tomorrow London and launched its first handbag line. Earlier in 2020, Manas and Delepierre had been among the twenty semifinalists for the LVMH Prize.

At the label's fall 2022 show in March 2022, the duo's second runway show, fewer than a third of the 29 looks went to conventionally thin models, and The New York Times called Ester Manas the most size-inclusive brand of that fashion week. Later that year the spring 2023 show, "Sunset Body", gave a first glimpse of a coming collaboration with the Danish brand Ganni, and Elle reported that the label counted Lizzo, Shygirl, Paloma Elsesser, and Adèle Exarchopoulos among its fans. The fall 2023 collection, "For Better or For Worse", shown on March 4, 2023, was designed around the couple's coming wedding and introduced bridal looks.

=== ANDAM Special Prize ===
In May 2023, Ester Manas was named one of six finalists for the grand prize of the 2023 ANDAM Fashion Award. At the ceremony at the Palais-Royal in Paris on June 29, 2023, the jury split the runner-up Special Prize for the first time in the award's history, awarding it jointly to Ester Manas and Duran Lantink, with 100,000 euros for each label. That June the label also released a ten-piece summer capsule with Ganni, sized from EU 32 to 52.

Rather than mount a spring 2024 show, the duo sat out the season to spend the prize money on developing new categories, among them outerwear, trousers, knitwear, and size-inclusive lingerie made with the French company Chantelle. By then the label was stocked at around 25 retailers, including Selfridges, Matchesfashion, SSENSE, Farfetch, and Galeries Lafayette. In December 2023, an olive-green version of the label's ruffled tulle dress, first shown for spring 2022, was featured in "Women Dressing Women", the Costume Institute exhibition at the Metropolitan Museum of Art, which had a custom non-standard-size mannequin made to display it.

The label returned to the runway with its fall 2024 show on February 27, 2024, which added down jackets in recycled nylon, ribbed knit separates, croc-stamped leather, and trenches made from Balenciaga deadstock. For spring 2025, shown that September, the collection was titled "The Elephant in the Room", after the industry's pullback from size inclusivity in the Ozempic era, and the show was staged with a giant sculpted elephant at the top of the runway and lingerie pieces by Chantelle X.

=== Hiatus and return ===
The label then stayed off the calendar for two years, a period in which Manas and Delepierre had a son and moved the business from wholesale to direct-to-consumer sales. In a February 2026 guest essay for WWD, Manas wrote that the industry's embrace of size inclusivity had "all but disappeared"; she described magazine-cover tokenism as "cosmetic, staged and desperately empty".

In 2026 the label was among the designers featured in "Costume Art", the Met's spring exhibition, where a look from its spring 2022 collection appeared in a section on the "Corpulent Body". A footwear collaboration with FitFlop, five silhouettes built around the mule, was released on September 3, 2026. The label returned to Paris Fashion Week on September 29, 2026, with a spring 2027 collection titled "Somehow I Manage", after the memoir that the character Michael Scott never finishes in The Office; the collection was developed with the Belgian lingerie brand Primadonna, and three pieces from the collaboration went on sale that day.

== Design approach ==
The label's garments are largely produced in a single size, built to fit bodies from a French 34 to a 50, roughly a US 2 to 18, through stretch fabrics, ruching, smocking, and adjustable belts, straps, and snaps. Manas has said the goal is to "fit the body, rather than trying to make bodies fit the clothes". Collections are cut mostly from deadstock fabrics and manufactured in Brussels. Manas has framed the label's casting as a practical matter rather than a manifesto: "It's about reality. It's not about dreams."
