= Glenn Martens =

Belgian fashion designer

- Born: 29 April 1983 (age 43); Bruges, Belgium
- Education: Sint-Lucas School of Architecture; Royal Academy of Fine Arts
- Labels: Jean Paul Gaultier (2008–2012); Glenn Martens (2012–2013); Y/Project (2013–2024); Diesel (2020–present); Maison Margiela (2025–present)

Glenn Martens (born 29 April 1983) is a Belgian fashion designer who has been serving as creative director of Maison Margiela since 2025.

Martens began as a junior designer at Jean Paul Gaultier for the women's pre-collection and menswear label G2 (2008–2012). He launched his own label in 2012 which ran for three seasons, before taking over Y/Project (2013–2024) as creative director after one of its co-founders, Yohan Serfaty, died. Martens also served as creative director of Diesel from 2020 to 2026.

== Early life and education ==
Glenn Martens was born on 29 April 1983 in Bruges, Belgium. He has an older brother.

Martens graduated with a Bachelors in Interior Design from Sint-Lucas School of Architecture in Ghent in 2004. With no prior education in fashion design, he applied for a Masters at the Royal Academy of Fine Arts in Antwerp and graduated first in his class. He would then be offered his first position at Jean Paul Gaultier.

== Career ==
=== Early beginnings ===
After his Masters graduate show in 2008, Martens was recruited by Jean Paul Gaultier as a junior designer for his women's pre-collection and men's label, G2. Leaving the brand in 2012, he went on to found his own label which ran for three seasons.

In 2013, Martens joined Y/Project as personal assistant to the brand's co-founder, Yohan Serfaty. After the latter died of cancer, Martens was appointed the new creative director. Martens designed the final collection for the brand before announcing his retirement, Autumn/Winter 2024, featuring celebrities including Kanye West, Charli XCX, Mia Khalifa, Tyga, and Irina Shayk.

=== Diesel, 2020–2026 ===
In 2020, whilst still leading Y/Project, Martens was announced as the next creative director of Diesel, after the brand had been without lead since 2017. He debuted his first collection during Milan men's fashion week for Spring/Summer 2022. During his tenure at Diesel, Martens was credited with reinvigorating the brand, having seen celebrity endorsements including Rihanna and Michelle Obama, and designing the Met Gala outfits for Kylie Minogue, Damiano David, and Dove Cameron.

In 2022, Martens returned to Jean Paul Gaultier as a guest designer for Couture Spring/Summer 2022. He was also asked to adjudicate the Tom of Finland Foundation Emerging Artists Competition as well as the Hyères 37th Fashion Festival, where he also received a career retrospective as a guest of honour.

While at Diesel in 2020, Martens has given a new approach to denim, with experimental silhouettes, distressed textures and sculptural forms.

In September 2026, Diesel announced that Martens would leave his role as creative director after six years to focus on his work at Maison Margiela.

=== Maison Margiela, 2025–present ===
In January 2025, it was announced that Martens would be replacing John Galliano as the next creative director of Maison Margiela. Chairman for the OTB Group, Renzo Rosso – who own both Maison Margiela and Diesel – explained that he has worked with Martens for years and believes he has the vision to lead the brand, as the third creative director in the company's history.

Martens was also announced to be the next designer to partner with H&M for an Autumn 2025 collaboration.

== Style and influence ==
Martens's designs are characterised by experimental construction, asymmetry and the manipulation of familiar garments into exaggerated silhouettes. He has linked his emphasis on construction to his training in interior architecture. At Y/Project, his work included doubled collars, cut-outs, extended denim cuffs and garments shaped with internal wiring, combining workwear and sportswear with historical references. His collections have drawn on aristocratic and ecclesiastical dress, Flemish painting and the architectural heritage of his hometown, Bruges.

Writing in GQ in 2024, Samuel Hine credited Martens and Y/Project with helping to popularise trompe-l'œil effects in contemporary fashion, while highlighting his use of textile treatments to reinterpret denim at Diesel. In a 2025 profile in Le Monde, Leyla Neri, head of the fashion design master's programme at the Institut Français de la Mode, identified Martens as a significant influence on fashion students, alongside fellow Belgian designers Raf Simons and Martin Margiela.

== Collaborations ==
=== Personal ===
- 2022 – Jean Paul Gaultier Couture Spring/Summer 2022 guest designer
- 2022 – Tom of Finland Foundation Emerging Artists Competition judge
- 2022 – Hyères 37th Fashion Festival Retrospective, jury president, and guest of honor
- 2025 – H&M Autumn 2025 designer collaboration

=== Y/Project (2013–2024) ===
- 2019 – Diesel Spring/Summer Red Tag Project
- 2020 – Canada Goose Autumn/Winter
- 2020 – Melissa (4 years in a row)
- 2022 – Fila Spring/Summer
- 2022 – Jean Paul Gaultier Autumn/Winter
- 2024 – Salomon Autumn/Winter

=== Diesel (2020–) ===
- 2021 – Tom of Finland Pride Month (3 years in a row)
- 2023 – Lee denim 'DIESELOVES LEE' (2 years in a row)
- 2024 – Durex Autumn/Winter
- 2024 – Savage X Fenty 'Savage X Diesel'
- 2024 – Damiano David Genderless

== Publications ==
- Martens, Glenn et al. Exhibition Magazine – The Deconstruction Issue. Sophie Abriat (ed). Paris. 2020.
- Martens, Glenn. A Magazine 27 – Curated by Glenn Martens. A Publisher, Antwerp. 2024. ISBN 978-2487343016

== Recognition ==
- 2017 – Grand Prize, ANDAM Fashion Awards
- 2018 – Designer of the Year, Belgian Fashion Awards
- 2020 – Second Prize, ANDAM Fashion Awards Family Fund
- 2022 – Designer of the Year, Belgian Fashion Awards
