= Groupe Chantelle =

French lingerie company

- Type: Limited company
- Industry: Textile industry
- Founded: 1876
- Headquarters: 8-10 rue de provigny, 94230 Cachan, France
- Key people: Mr Gamichon, Maurice Kretz, Jean Kretz, Claude Kretz, Patrice Kretz
- Products: Corset, lingerie, swimwear, tights
- Net income: Annual turnover €370,000,000
- Owner: Président Directeur Général, Patrice Kretz
- Number of employees: 6200
- Divisions: Chantelle, Passionata, Darjeeling, Orcanta, Femilet, Chantal Thomass, Livera
- Website: www.groupechantelle.com

The Groupe Chantelle is a family owned French lingerie company. It produces several lingerie brands on an international scale.

== History ==
The roots of the Groupe Chantelle go back to the 19th century, specifically 1876, when Mr Gamichon founded a company specialising in the manufacturing of elastic knits. He tapped the discovery of the vulcanisation of rubber which allows improved conservation. The products were then exported all the way to Latin America.

In 1898, he went into partnership with his nephew, Paul-Maurice Kretz, the first representative of the Kretz family. The company changed its name, becoming Les Etablissements Kretz.

In 1902, Les Etablissements Kretz launched production of its line of corsets with elastic bands focused on comfort.

In 1936, Jean Kretz took over the company, rebranding it SNEK (Société nouvelle des Etablissements Kretz). He then invented an elastic fabric with the width and height which would allow the Chantelle corsets to be launched several years later.

His son, Claude Kretz, took over the business in 1949 and launched the production of corsets. He brought back the Chantelle name inherited from his grandfather Paul-Maurice. At this point, the Chantelle brand is first introduced, quickly establishing its reputation.

In 1960, SNEK started to produce bras with the construction of its first factory in Épernay, in the north of France. The company then launched its Fête model made of Calais lace, then in 1972 it launched its Défi model, the first moulded bra. Bras soon became the company's development engine and in 1976 it changed its name to Chantelle SA.

In 1962 the group grew and started investing in the European market with the establishment of its first branch in Germany then in the Benelux countries and Switzerland. Today the group has 15 international branches. It is the largest French exporter of women's lingerie.

In 1985, Patrice Kretz, current Président Directeur Général, joined the group. In 1988 he suggested the launch of a younger, more affordable brand: Passionata. The success was immediate. In the late 1990s, Passionata started to be distributed on a massive scale.

In 1993, the inauguration of the American branch in New York marks the Group's expansion beyond Europe.

In 1995, Chantelle SA launches Darjeeling, the Group's first brand sold exclusively in its own retail outlets. The network gained further strength in France.

In 2006, the Group made the acquisition of the Orcanta retail network, a new distribution channel.

Between 2010 and 2011, the Group expanded with the acquisition of the Danish brand Femilet, and the designer brand Chantal Thomass.

In 2014, the group acquired Livera, a Dutch multi-brand company based near Amsterdam. The Livera shops sell women's lingerie products, swimwear and nightwear.

== Brands ==
The Groupe Chantelle owns the following brands and networks:

- Chantelle
- Darjeeling
- Orcanta
- Femilet
- Chantal Thomass
- Livera

== Bibliography ==
- Chantelle Paris, Anne Zazzo - © Editions Assouline – category Mémoire de la mode 2010
- Lingerie Française XIX – XXI century, Catherine Ormen - © Editions Plon 2012
