= Longchamp (company) =

French leather goods company

Longchamp SAS

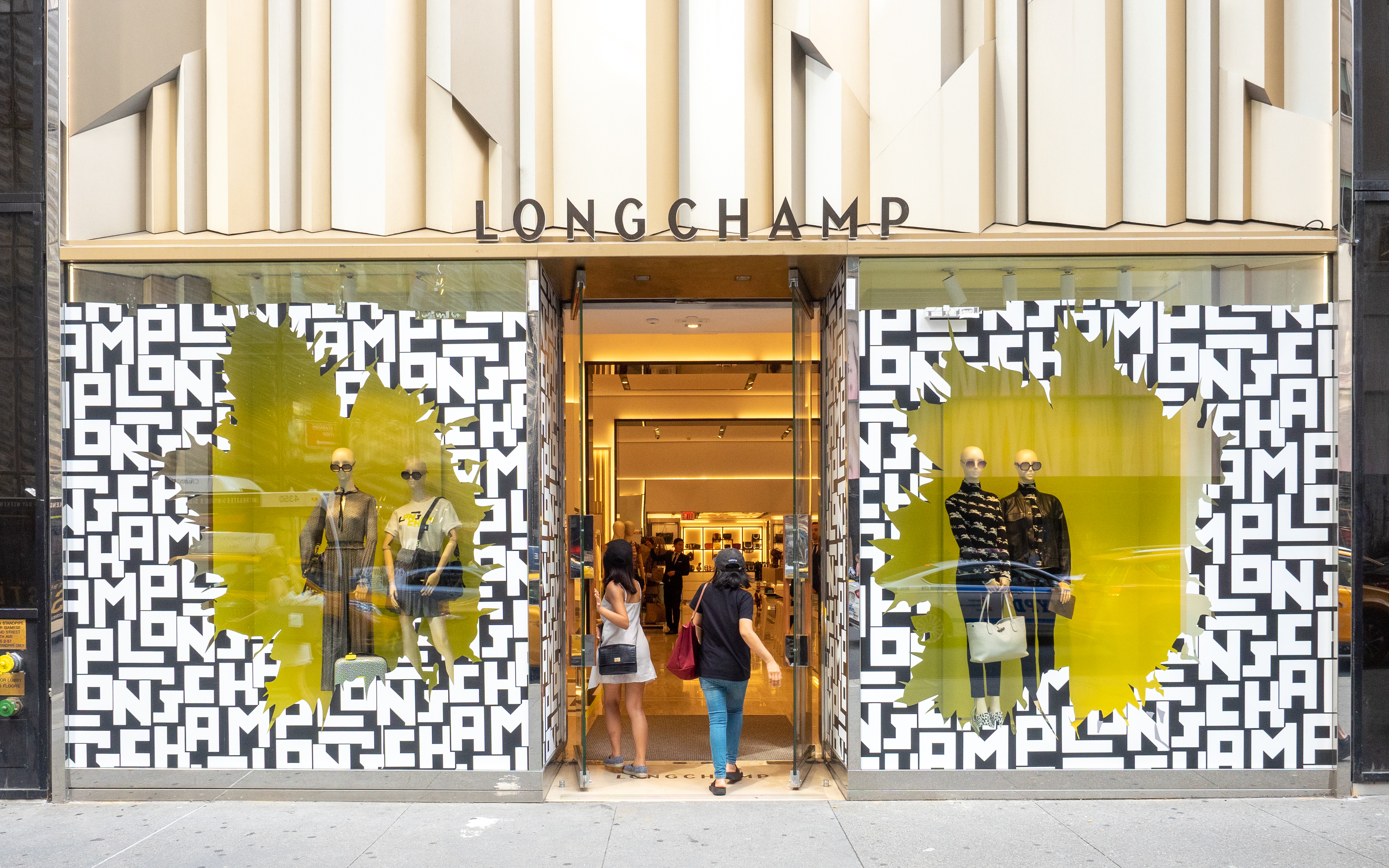
- Longchamp flagship store, Manhattan
- Type: Private
- Industry: Fashion
- Founded: 1948; 78 years ago in Paris
- Founder: Jean Cassegrain
- Headquarters: Paris, France
- Area served: Worldwide
- Key people: Jean Cassegrain (CEO); Sophie Delafontaine (creative director)
- Products: Handbags; small leather goods; luggage; footwear; ready-to-wear
- Owner: Cassegrain family
- Number of employees: 3,000
- Website: longchamp.com

Longchamp (French pronunciation: [lɔ̃ʃɑ̃]) is a French leather goods company, founded in Paris in 1948 by Jean Cassegrain. The company pioneered leather-covered pipes before expanding into small leather goods. Longchamp debuted women's handbags in 1971, becoming one of France's leading leather goods makers. Today, the company designs and manufactures leather and canvas handbags, luggage, shoes, travel items, fashion accessories, and women's ready-to-wear. The house is privately owned and managed by the Cassegrain founding family and does business in 80 countries through around 1,500 retail outlets.

== History ==
=== Early history ===
In 1948, Jean Cassegrain took over his father's traditional tobacco business "Au Sultan" in Paris.

After the Second World War, Jean Cassegrain catered to Allied troops with his tobacco and smoking accessories. Pipe sales were the most profitable part of his business. Little by little, soldiers became the store's best customers.

When they left Paris at the end of the conflict, Jean Cassegrain diversified. In the 1950s, he introduced the world's first luxury leather-covered pipes which featured exotic leathers. International celebrities such as Elvis Presley loved them.

Jean Cassegrain created his company, called Jean Cassegrain et compagnie, to broaden the distribution of his leather-covered items for smokers. However, the products were marketed under another name. Since distant relatives had already used his family name Cassegrain to sell fine paper in Paris, he named his brand after the Parisian Longchamp Racecourse. At that time, there was a flour mill visible on the outskirts of Paris, at the end of the Longchamp Racecourse’s final furlong. Jean Cassegrain named his brand after the racecourse as a nod to the flour mill, as the name Cassegrain literally means "crush grain" (miller) in French. Hence a jockey on a galloping race horse was chosen as a logo.

=== 1950s to 1980s ===
Longchamp's success with leather-covered pipes convinced Cassegrain that the firm's future lay in diversifying and expanding its product line to small leather goods, passport covers, wallets, bags and other leather accessories for men.

In the early 1950s, he was already prospecting and selling on all continents. He hired an export manager and began exporting his products.

Jean and his son Philippe Cassegrain were interested in expanding the company's markets and opportunities. Longchamp opened boutiques in Southeast Asia towards the end of the 1970s and was one of the first European brands to be sold in Singapore, Hong Kong and Japan. Longchamp turned into a worldwide business.

==== Company's first women's handbag ====
The company's breakthrough came with the use of nylon in the 1970s, the first company to make bags out of nylon. Longchamp created a leather and nylon luggage collection, allowing for lightweight luggage, contrary to the overweight suitcases typically sold at the time. This innovation led the company to design a women's handbag in the same design, Le Pliage, a few decades later. The Philippe Cassegrain sketched a line of bags in khaki nylon and leather in the 1970s. This collection was an alternative to carrying heavy suitcases and became a wide success. Philippe Cassegrain also invented the Xtra-Bag, a bag that folded down to a quarter of its size and slid into a simple case. The Xtra-bag was the predecessor of the Le Pliage handbag.

As the business expanded, Jean Cassegrain noticed that women had become interested in handbags. Longchamp launched its first women's handbag in 1971 by reworking a toiletry case and adding a shoulder strap and two flaps. From that time on, the company began focusing on luggage and women's handbags.

In 1978, Longchamp introduced the LM line, its first women's handbags collection. The bags were created from printed leather. Items for smokers disappeared from the catalogue the same year.

In 1983, Philippe became Longchamp's CEO. He brought his wife, Michèle, into the company to run the retail side. In 1991, Philippe and Michèle's eldest son, Jean, came to work with his father. Later, their daughter, Sophie, became the company's artistic director.

=== 1990s to present ===
1993 was a turning point in Longchamp's history. In 1993, Philippe Cassegrain, Longchamp's CEO, designed what would become the company's most famous handbag: Le Pliage, which means ‘folding’ in French. Philippe Cassegrain wanted to create a practical yet stylish fold-up bag. The Le Pliage is a handbag that folds into a distinctive trapezoidal shape, making the image of an envelope. To keep the bag very light, Philippe Cassegrain combined Russian leather handles with a nylon canvas body. The bag's shape and wide range of colors and styles, make it the brand's most successful product and one of the most popular handbags in the world.

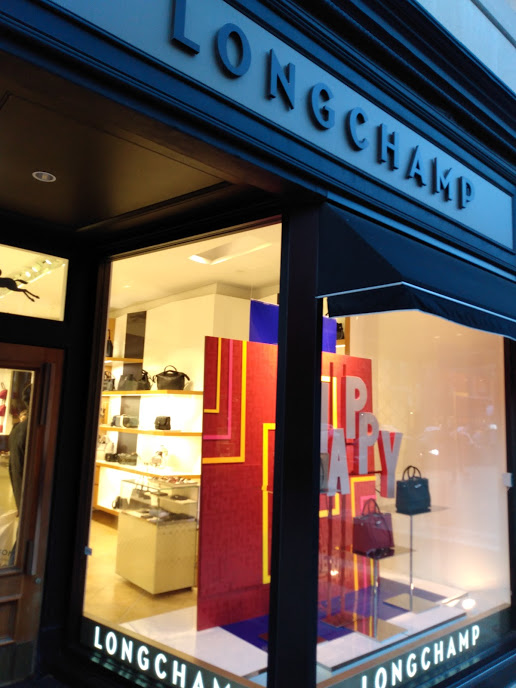
Newbury Street Longchamp store in Back Bay, Boston

Longchamp has collaborated with designers and artists such as Tracey Emin, Mary Katrantzou, Jeremy Scott and Sarah Morris to reinterpret its collection of Le Pliage totes.

To celebrate its 70th anniversary, in September 2018 the brand put on its first fashion show in New York during Fashion Week. Among the celebrities present were Kendall Jenner, Kate Moss, Kaia Gerber and Isabelle Huppert.

Kendall Jenner was named ambassador of Longchamp in April 2018. In May 2018, she appeared in a short film, "The Encounter", directed for the brand by John Christopher Pina.

In February 2019, the brand unveiled its fall-winter 2019 collection at a new show on Wall Street in New York.

In August 2020, Longchamp launched Green District, its first line of bags designed from recycled nylon fiber “Econyl”.

== Corporate structure ==
Longchamp is currently run and managed by the 3rd generation of the family, direct descendants of Jean Cassegrain, founder:

- Jean Cassegrain, Chief Executive Officer
- Sophie Delafontaine, Artistic director
- Olivier Cassegrain, Director USA boutiques

Michèle Cassegrain, Director of boutiques, died in November 2016.

Longchamp is valued at $1.5 billion. The company's independence gives the Cassegrain family stability and allows them to think and plan long-term. Longchamp is one of the last remaining family-owned leather goods manufacturers in France.

Philippe Cassegrain has died on November 28, 2020, aged 83 from Covid-19 complications.

== Collaborations ==
In the 1950s and 1960s, Longchamp's products appeared in French cinema and particularly in Jean Gabin's films.

The brand's relationship to art continued in the 1970s when they introduced a limited edition series of bags featuring a design by the famous Franco-Russian artist Serge Mendjisky. In 1971, he added leather patchwork to bags. With this invention, Longchamp was one of the first leather goods brands to enter the world of collaborations with famous artists. Since then, they have continued to work with other artists in designing special products and in store installations.

In 2004, Longchamp began its first collaboration with independent designer, Thomas Heatherwick. Heatherwick first designed the best-selling Zip Bag, a handbag constructed of a long zipper. The success of the Zip Bag led to Heatherwick's designing of the Longchamp's New York City flagship store.

In 2004 and 2005 Tracey Emin personalized luggage for Longchamp. Tracey Emin realized a patchwork Longchamp bag featuring the message ‘Me Every Time’.

Jeremy Scott has regularly designed special editions of Le Pliage tote since 2005 as well as other collections of handbags every year.

In 2008, Longchamp reissued its LM collection, offering a version illustrated by Jean-Luc Moerman.

In 2009, Jeremy Scott, Charles Anastase and design duo Bless joined forces to celebrate 20 years of the French association ANDAM (Association Nationale pour le Développement des Arts de la Mode), which promotes emerging French and international fashion talent. For the occasion, each of the designers created limited edition variations of Longchamp's Le Pliage handbag. "Le Pliage bag is a French icon, no different from the croissant or the Eiffel tower. It is chic, sophisticated and handsome all in one" said Jeremy Scott.

Between 2005 and 2015, Jeremy Scott created 20 styles of bags. Each year, he has taken one of his pop culture-infused designs and used it to give Longchamp's Le Pliage a new look. His designs over the past 10 years have included a poodle in space, zodiac signs, a credit card and tire tracks. The limited-edition of handbags created for the 10th anniversary of his partnership with Longchamp featured a postcard from Hollywood, signed by the designer "Wish you were here".

Kate Moss collaborated with the brand to design handbags. She first suggested adding a red lining to the Legende bag. The top model then worked with Longchamp artistic director Sophie Delafontaine and released bags under the label "Kate Moss for Longchamp". In 2010, she launched a whole product line, based on her own use of handbags. The Kate Moss collection was made up of 12 different bags inspired by her "city living". The bags were named after her favorite places in London: Soho, Ladbroke, Goldbourne, Gloucester, Glastonbury.

In 2011, Longchamp teamed up with designer Mary Katrantzou to create a range of printed tote bags. They featured her trompe-l'œil fabrics. The designer's bags were inspired by temples in Vietnam and flower parades, and featured bold colors and wild designs. In 2012, the designer created two handbags bearing exclusive new prints. The larger tote bag was decorated with orchids, dragons and corals. For the smaller one, the designer used both an Asian temple and New York's Carnegie Hall as her starting points, adorning both with colorful flowers and lanterns. Mary Katrantzou also designed a Le Pliage handbag featuring orchids and lanterns.

In 2014, Longchamp partnered with artist Sarah Morris to create a limited edition of Le Pliage handbags.

In April 2016, Longchamp has begun renovations of its historical store on rue Saint-Honoré in Paris. While works take place, the storefront is wrapped in a spectacular work of art "Mindscapes" by American artist, Ryan McGinness.

In 2017, Longchamp began an association with the Franco-Armenian artist Vahram Muratyan.

In 2018, Longchamp aligned with Shayne Oliver, the founder of New York-based streetwear Hood By Air, to develop an exclusive capsule collection of leather goods, footwear, ready-to-wear garments and garment bags for SS18.

In September 2020, during Paris Fashion Week, Longchamp presented a collaboration with Pokémon for the Le Pliage line. The character Pikachu appears with a jockey bomb, in reference to the history of the company. The brand is also present in the Pokémon Go game, in which players may customize their avatar with a virtual Longchamp backpack.

On July 22, 2025, Longchamp signed an exclusive fragrance license agreement with Interparfums, extending through 2036. The first fragrance launch is planned for 2027.

== Production ==
Initially, Jean Cassegrain purchased items for smokers (particularly pipes) and had them covered with leather by Parisian craftsmen. Faced with the brand's success, and to support the diversification of the products offered, he opened Longchamp's first workshop in Segré, France, in 1959 .

The company's production capacity increased regularly in Segré and through new facilities: Rémalard in 1969, Ernée in 1972, then Combrée, Château-Gontier and Montournais in the 2000s. Longchamp continues to manufacture its products in France through its own workshops and owns the largest leather manufacture in France. Six French factories provide half of the handbags sold by the company, with the other half created by partners.

Longchamp is currently building its new production site in Pouzauges, France, with plans to move its leather workshops, currently based in Montournais, to this new site. This project is part of the company's plans to develop and modernize its production process. This new site, which measures approximately 7000 square meters, will have space for 100 people (compared to 70 currently) and will include a learning workshop to support the training and the integration of new staff. This new production site should open in 2018.

The company manufactures most of its products, except its ready-to-wear clothing and shoes collections, which it has produced by expert manufacturers located mainly in France and Italy.

In September 2018, Longchamp inaugurated a new 7,000 sqm production site at Pouzauges, in the Vendée region. This is the company's sixth workshop in France. This new production unit also includes a training facility attached to the workshop.

In 2018, half of the brand's production was carried out in France. The company employs 900 people in its workshops located in the west of France.

== Boutiques ==
In 2013, Longchamp invested in logistics to support company growth. The company built a 23,000 m2 logistics center in Segré, France. This facility is double the size of the company's previous facilities.

The company relies on an international distribution network and sells an extensive range of products.

The brand has a presence in 80 countries including in Brazil, Israel, UAE, Peru, Chile, Paraguay, Canada, Austria, Macao, Cambodia, Malaysia, Thailand, Philippines, Indonesia... Longchamp plans to expand its network across the Middle-East region with a focus on Saudi Arabia and Qatar. The company has also franchised shops in Mexico, Venezuela and Colombia.

In 2018, Longchamp had 1,500 points of sale worldwide, of which 300 are proprietary stores. A total of 3,200 people work for the brand worldwide through company-owned boutiques and franchises, department store concessions, multi-brand fine leather goods dealers, airport shops and online sales, through 20 distribution subsidiaries.

=== North America ===
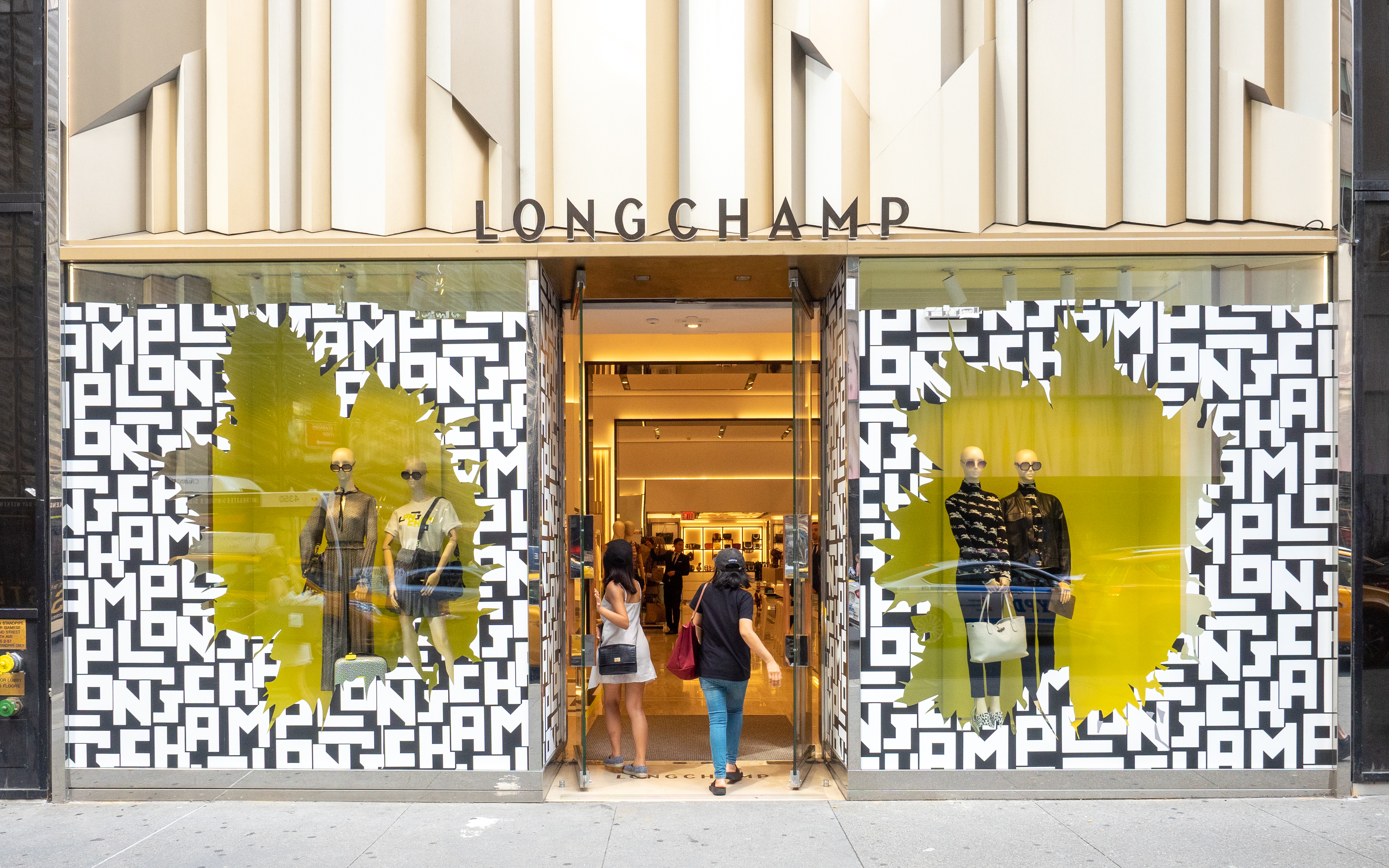
Store on Madison Avenue

In the US, Longchamp has been distributed through retailers since the 1950s. The company opened its first US store on Madison Avenue in 1984. Saks Fifth Avenue and Nordstrom were the first major American retailers to carry the brand, followed by Bloomingdale's. In 1993, Longchamp set up its own office in New York City to grow the business.

In 2006, the company opened a flagship store, "La Maison Unique" in New York City's SoHo district. This store was the brand's biggest store and was designed by Thomas Heatherwick who also created a handbag called the Zip Bag, which became one of the company's best selling items.

In 2014, Longchamp had 17 stores in North America.

In April 2018, Longchamp inaugurated a new store on 5th Avenue in New York. The brand also opened a store in Beverly Hills, California.

=== Europe ===
In 1988, Longchamp opened its first dedicated boutique in Paris, France, at 390 rue Saint-Honoré. By 1999, the Paris boutique moved to 404 rue Saint-Honoré to expand its sales floor.

In 2013, Longchamp opened a boutique on Regent Street, London, which became the company's largest store in Europe and the second largest in the world after New York City.

In December 2014, the company opened a larger boutique on the Champs-Élysées in Paris. The store has 500 square meters of retail space split into two levels and is now Longchamp's largest store in Europe. This flagship store houses the brand's entire leatherwear range of accessories for men and women, as well as luggage, women's "ready-to-wear" clothing and shoes. This boutique features a wall of Longchamp's famous Le Pliage handbags and attracts Parisians and tourists from around the world.

Longchamp is present in major European cities, including London, Edinburgh, Rome, Barcelona, Munich and Vienna.

=== Asia ===
Longchamp has been present in mainland China since 2006.

In 2011, Longchamp opened a new flagship store in Hong Kong, "La Maison 8". This boutique is the company's second largest in the world (after the SoHo location). A year later, Longchamp opened seven additional stores in China including in Beijing and Shanghai, making a total of 50 stores.

The company operated 22 stores in Southeast Asia in 2014. These shops accounted for 10% of global sales.

In October 2017, Longchamp inaugurated its largest Asian boutique on Omotesando Avenue in Tokyo. The store is spread out over seven floors and displays all of the collections, to include luggage, ready-to-wear, shoes and leather goods. A fresco by Australian artist John Aslanidis is featured on part of the building.

In 2018, the brand joined forces with the Chinese blogger Tao Liang, known as Mr. Bags, to design a capsule collection. Longchamp has 18 stores in China and is preparing to launch its Chinese e-commerce site in 2019.

== See also ==
- Leather crafting
