= Christine Phung =

French fashion designer (born 1978)

- Born: October 11, 1978 (age 48); Levallois Perret
- Known for: Fashion designer

Christine Phung (born October 11, 1978) is a French fashion designer based in Paris. Phung is highly regarded for her digital prints. She is the founder of her own eponymous fashion label and the current creative director at Leonard Paris.

== Early life ==
Christine Phung was born to a Cambodian father and French mother.

After attending the Ecole des Beaux-Arts at Rueil-Malmaison, she studied fashion design at the Ecole d'Art Appliqué Duperré in Paris before joining the l'Institut Français de la Mode in 2002.

== Career ==
Prior to Phung launching her ready-to-wear label, she worked as a fashion designer for various houses including Christophe Lemaire, Kenzo, See by Chloé, Vanessa Bruno, Sonia Rykiel and sportswear brands Lacoste, Rossignol, Veja, along with a stint in childrenswear at Baby Dior.

In 2008, her pieces were exhibited at the Musée d'Art Moderne in Liège for the Design Biennale.

In 2011 Christine Phung launched eponymous fashion label. In 2013 Christine Phung joined the official Paris Fashion Week calendar.

During her nine collections, Christine Phung developed an aesthetic between strict elegance and luxury sportswear. She can be seen as one who experiments with fluidly, colorful and architecture of the garment. Phung is noted for her inspiration by digital aesthetics and fascination of geometry found in nature. She is also interested in traditional techniques, such as folds, patchwork, and embroidery, screen printing, which she has modernized.

In 2015 and 2016 she designed two collections for French house Georges Rech.

In March 2016, she was named creative director for Leonard Paris.

== Awards ==
- Finalist in the MANGO Fashion Awards in 2011
- Grand Prix de la Création from the city of Paris in 2011
- The ANDAM Award for First Collection in 2013.
- First Prize of the Aubusson Aime la Mode Award from the Tapestry d'Aubusson in 2015

== Collaborations ==
- 2010-2012 Created a line of shoes with fashion designer Marion Hanania founder for the label Vegan Good Guys
- 2013 Created silicon injected lace for the SS14 collection of textile designer Tzuri Gueta
- 2014 Collaborated on the FW14/15 collection for textile designer Janaïna Milheiro
- 2014 Created an exclusive collection of bags for leather designer Florian Denicourt
- 2015 Designer belts for leather brand Les Brutalistes
- 2015 Capsule collection for La Redoute
- 2015 Created a print with artist Philippe Decrauzat for SS16
- 2016 Created a print with artist Mathieu Mercier for FW16/17 with pieces exhibited at Galerie Joyce
- 2016 Leather capsule collection in collaboration with Galeries Lafayette
- 2016 Collaboration with designer Lucas de Staël for exclusive handmade glasses
