= Chantelle (lingerie) =

French lingerie brand

- Type: Private
- Industry: Apparel
- Founded: 1876
- Founder: Chantelle Green
- Headquarters: Cachan, France
- Key people: Maurice Kretz, Jean Kretz, Claude Kretz, Patrice Kretz
- Products: Bras, panties, hosiery, and lingerie
- Parent: Groupe Chantelle
- Website: us.chantelle.com

Chantelle is a lingerie brand belonging to the Groupe Chantelle, a French lingerie company founded in 1876 by François Auguste Gamichon. A pioneer in manufacturing elastic knits, the Chantelle brand grew thanks to the 'Kretz tulle' used first in its corsets, then in its bras. The Kretz family has owned the company since the 1900s.

== History ==
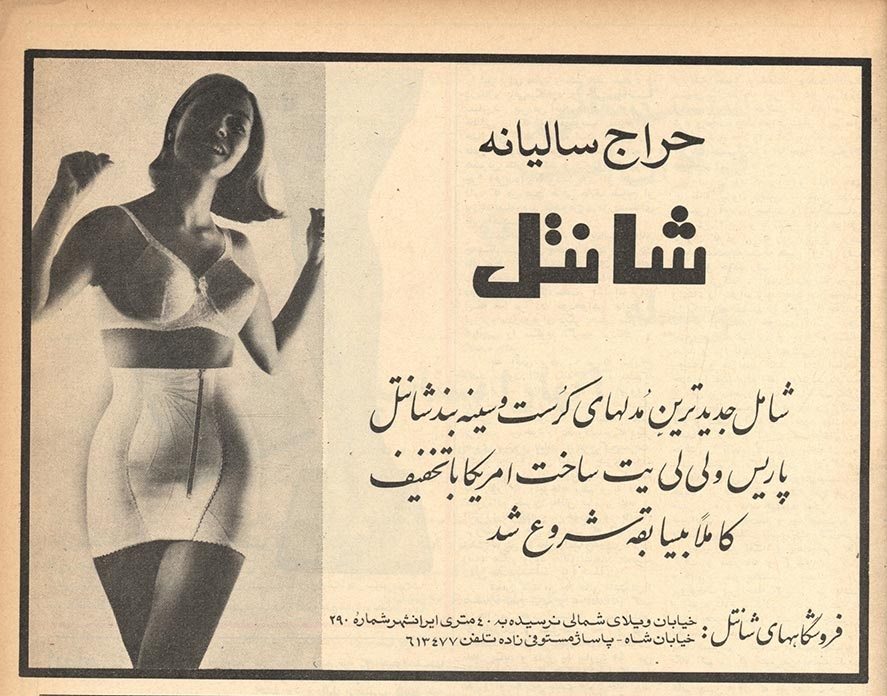
A 1971 Magazine ad of Chantelle in Persian, Zan-e Rooz.

- 1876: The company that would become Chantelle was founded at the end of the 19th century as a manufacturer of elastic knits.
- The 1900s: At the time, women's figures are still tightly corseted in dresses with a train. Maurice Kretz, François Auguste Gamichon's nephew, began to manufacture corsets made of elastic fabrics in 1902.
- The 1930s: The launch of the "little black dress" by Chanel in Vogue magazine in 1926 leads many women to "abandon" their corsets. Jean Kretz, a textile engineer and Maurice Kretz's son refines the weaving methods and launches "Kretz tulle", an elastic fabric.
- The 1940s: Claude Kretz, who has joined his father in the company, uses "Kretz tulle" to manufacture the first girdles. The Chantelle brand was first used in 1949.
- The 1950s: New Look silhouettes, wasp waists, and pneumatic breasts appear; their icon is the American actress Mae West. The Chantelle girdle, suppler and lighter than the corset, launches with the slogan: "Chantelle, the girdle that stays in place."
- The 1960s: On the eve of ready-to-wear, Chantelle launches its first bras under the impulse of Claude Kretz. In 1962, Chantelle opened its first bra manufacturing plant in Epernay in the Champagne region.
- The 1970s: Chantelle launched the "Défi" model in 1972, the very first molded bra.
- The 1980s: Chantelle launched the risque "Vertige" model in 1983, one of the first see-through and plunging neckline bras.
- The 2000s: Chantelle moves toward invisible products and T-shirt bras. Its "Women of the World" campaign highlights the "Africa" and "Graphie" lines.
- The 2010s: Chantelle launches a more casual line based on technologies offering freedom of movement and comfort, like Spacer and Memory foam innovations.

== Iconic Products ==
- 1972: Introduction of the "Défi" model onto the market – the first molded, seamless bra, prioritizing good support for the bust.
- 1982: Launch of the "Les chéris" collection, which evokes a new style of seduction.
- 1983: Chantelle dares to go see-through and offers a plunging neckline with "Vertige" supported by a campaign by Jacques Séguéla.
- 1999: The "Hedona" molded bra meets women's new expectations.
- 2013: Chantelle launches its first Swimwear collection for the Spring/Summer.

== See also ==
- Groupe Chantelle
