= Louis-Gabriel Nouchi =

French fashion designer

- Born: Paris, France
- Education: La Cambre
- Label: LGN Louis Gabriel Nouchi
- Awards: Grand Prize, ANDAM Fashion Awards (2023)
- Website: louisgabrielnouchi.com

Louis-Gabriel Nouchi is a French fashion designer. He is the founder of LGN Louis Gabriel Nouchi, a Paris-based label established in 2017 that bases each of its collections on a book and is known for gender-fluid and size-inclusive designs. In 2023 he won the Grand Prize of the ANDAM Fashion Awards, and in 2024 he designed the costumes for the opening ceremony of the Paris Paralympic Games. The label, which shows during Paris Men's Fashion Week, added womenswear with its Fall/Winter 2024 collection.

== Early life and education ==
Nouchi was born and raised in Paris. He first studied medicine and then law, earning a bachelor's degree in law before turning to fashion. An internship at Vogue Paris, where Carine Roitfeld was editor-in-chief at the time, was his entry into the industry; the magazine's staff advised him on which fashion schools to apply to, and he moved to Belgium to study at La Cambre, the Brussels visual arts school.

Nouchi graduated from La Cambre in 2014, receiving the prize of his graduating class, and was selected the same year for the finals of the International Festival of Fashion and Photography in Hyères. After graduating, he spent a year on the design team at Raf Simons in Antwerp. He later moved to Italy to work for a tailor before returning to France. Before launching his own label, he designed capsule collections for the department store Galeries Lafayette, the retailer La Redoute, and the glovemaker Agnelle.

== Career ==
=== Founding the label ===
Nouchi founded LGN Louis Gabriel Nouchi in Paris at the end of 2017 as a joint venture with Pauline Duval, the managing director of the Duval real estate group. The partnership was announced on January 22, 2018, with the first LGN pieces presented during that month's Paris Fashion Week and the brand positioned between the high-end and luxury segments.

Early runway collections took their themes from Norman Mailer's Ancient Evenings, the basis of the Fall/Winter 2019 show, and from The Skin, Curzio Malaparte's novel of postwar Naples, which informed the Spring/Summer 2020 collection, the label's third on the runway.

=== Paris Fashion Week ===
For Fall/Winter 2020, shown at the Folies Bergère in January 2020, Nouchi closed a cycle of collections dedicated to Curzio Malaparte with trompe-l'oeil tailoring, and included a capsule developed with football club Paris Saint-Germain, among it a black velvet dress repeating the club's logo.

On June 24, 2021, Nouchi staged two shows in the same morning at the Palais de Tokyo, the day's only live presentations among the brands listed on the Paris calendar: a Silk Road-themed collection for the Chinese menswear brand Joeone, followed by the label's own Spring/Summer 2022 show. Inspired by Marguerite Duras's 1984 novel The Lover, the collection was renamed "Unauthorized" after the publisher refused Nouchi the right to use the book's title, and was shown in a co-ed format, modeled by women as well as men.

Charles Baudelaire's Les Paradis artificiels and Pierre Choderlos de Laclos's Les Liaisons dangereuses supplied the themes of the following two seasons. The Fall/Winter 2023 show, based on Bret Easton Ellis's American Psycho, was opened by Emily in Paris actor Lucas Bravo; The White Lotus actor Stefano Gianino and Zane Phillips also walked.

=== ANDAM Prize and womenswear ===
Presented at the Palais de Tokyo on June 22, 2023, the Spring/Summer 2024 collection took its theme from Christopher Isherwood's 1964 novel A Single Man and was conceived as an exploration of male sensuality, with male models crying on the runway. One week later, on June 29, 2023, Nouchi won the Grand Prize of the 2023 ANDAM Fashion Awards over five other finalists; the award carried a grant of 300,000 euros and a year of mentorship from Riccardo Bellini, the chief executive of Chloé.

The label introduced womenswear with its Fall/Winter 2024 collection, presented in January 2024 and based on Guy de Maupassant's Bel-Ami; Nouchi said the novel's social-climbing plot "gave us the idea to do women's wear for the first time." For Spring/Summer 2025 he narrowed the palette to black, bone, and oxblood and expanded the women's offering from seven looks to twenty-seven; the season also introduced handbags made with the Danish leather brand ECCO, marked with the same horizontal slash found on his knitwear.

=== Paralympics opening ceremony ===
In May 2024, Daphné Bürki, the styling and costumes director of the Paris 2024 ceremonies, and artistic director Thomas Jolly asked Nouchi to design the costumes for the opening ceremony of the 2024 Summer Paralympics. The ceremony, titled "Paradoxe," was held on August 28, 2024, with a procession down the Champs-Élysées to the Place de la Concorde and choreography by Alexander Ekman for a cast of some 150 dancers, including dancers with disabilities.

Working with a twenty-person costume team led by Olivier Beriot, Nouchi produced roughly 700 outfits and held individual fittings with the performers with disabilities to learn what they needed and what they had always wanted to wear. The wardrobe ran from machine-washable jersey sportswear to gowns trimmed with embroidery, rhinestones, and feathers, in a red, white, and blue palette meant as a deconstruction of the French flag. Among the performers he dressed was the singer Christine and the Queens, who wore a scarlet double-breasted trouser suit. Nouchi has said the project stirred an unexpected patriotism in him: "I was becoming more and more patriotic as I was working on this project."

=== Later collections ===
The Fall/Winter 2025 show, held on January 22, 2025, took George Orwell's Nineteen Eighty-Four as its theme and included para-athletes and transgender models on the runway for the first time. A group of gray tailoring in the collection, made with the Danish textile company Kvadrat, doubled as the label's entry for the 2025 International Woolmark Prize; Woolmark had named LGN one of the competition's eight finalists in November 2024.

For Spring/Summer 2026, presented in June 2025, Nouchi replaced the runway show with an animated short film screened at Silencio, the Paris nightclub founded by David Lynch, and moved the presentation date to coincide with Paris's Pride celebrations, after which he hosted one of the city's largest Pride parties. Later in 2025 he returned to the Hyères festival as a member of the fashion jury for its fortieth edition.

Nouchi launched an official OnlyFans account for the label in January 2026, announcing it on the runway of his Fall/Winter 2026 show with a model wearing a tank top and briefs printed with the platform's logo; he was one of three designers to collaborate on OnlyFans merchandise, after Elena Velez and Collina Strada's Hillary Taymour, and also filmed documentary videos of his shows for the platform's OFTV streaming service. His Spring/Summer 2027 collection, shown on June 26, 2026, drew on the television series Twin Peaks and expanded the womenswear line into dresses.

=== Retail ===
In September 2020 the label opened its first boutique, at 4 rue Oberkampf in the 11th arrondissement of Paris, with the design studio on the floor above. By 2023 the label was stocked by around forty retailers, among them SSENSE and H Lorenzo, alongside the boutique and its e-shop.

== Design approach ==
Nouchi has described the label as a library: every collection is a tribute to a book or writer that, in his words, "shaped his vision of the world," and he has said the device lets him address subversive or taboo themes "in an elegant way." Writing in Vogue, Sarah Mower has described his method as starting from a novel to explore masculinities.

Mower has named bold-shouldered tailoring and second-skin bodysuits as the label's dual design strengths. Other recurring details include horizontal slashes at the collars and waistbands of knitwear, a motif repeated on the label's handbags. Nouchi has traced his focus on the body to the label's longstanding underwear line, which he has called "the first layer you put on when you're dressing every day."

The collections are designed to be gender fluid, and women accounted for about half of the label's customers before womenswear was introduced. Nouchi has described casting as central to the brand, drawing his runway casts from the label's own customers and including plus-sized models, which he has said made LGN the only brand in Paris doing so for men at the time. Vogue Business has cited the label as a standout for size inclusivity on the Paris calendar.

From its early seasons the label has used fabrics with low environmental impact, natural dyes, and buttons and labels made from recycled plastic. In 2020 it introduced Re-lecture, an upcycled line that reworks pieces from past collections with new dyes and is renewed each season.

== Awards ==
Nouchi received his first industry prizes at the 2014 edition of the International Festival of Fashion and Photography in Hyères: the Galeries Lafayette endowment and the Camper and Palais de Tokyo prizes. The endowment came with a capsule collection designed for the department store. In June 2023 he won the Grand Prize of the ANDAM Fashion Awards, a 300,000-euro grant accompanied by a year of mentorship from Chloé chief executive Riccardo Bellini. He was one of eight finalists for the 2025 International Woolmark Prize.
