= Xuly Bët =

Fashion label

XULY.Bët Funkin' Fashion Factory
- Industry: Fashion
- Founded: 1989

XULY.Bët Funkin' Fashion Factory, or XULY.Bët ("to open your eyes wide" in Wolof), is a luxury clothing line designed by Malian-Senegalese fashion designer Lamine Badian Kouyaté.

== Influences ==
Xuly BJulys is known for incorporating African influences into contemporary fashion.

== Accolades ==
In 1994, The New York Times awarded Lamine Badian Kouyate the Creator of the Year Award, and he was featured in the film Ready-To-Wear. In 1995, he began a collaboration with Puma; since then, the company has collaborated with various other brands including, APC, Absolut Vodka, Naf Naf, les 3 Suisses, and Leclerc. Kouyate received the ANDAM Fashion Award in 1996, and was an active member of New York Fashion Week from 2009 to 2018.

In 2018, he and his works were featured in the exhibit "African Metropolis" at the MAXXI Museo in Rome.

== Lamine Badian Kouyaté ==
Kouyaté was born in Bamako on 28 December 1962. His father, Seydou Badian Kouyaté, was a notable writer and politician. His mother, Dr. Henriette Kouyaté Carvalho d’Alvarengo became the first Malian woman to obtain a doctor's license at 75.

Lamine Kouyaté moved to France around 1986. He then began studying architecture at the École Nationale Supérieure d'Architecture de Strasbourg.

He turned to fabrics and textiles as a medium for architecture. As he was working on the lightness of fabrics in the Hôpital Éphémère, XULY.Bët was made.

Kouyaté's interest in upcycling garments and incorporating African styles made XULY.Bët an influential underground fashion label. He references the work of designers Azzedine Alaïa and Yves Saint Laurent. His inspirations also come from punk rock, grunge, and funk music for his designs.
