= Duran Lantink =

Dutch fashion designer

- Born: 1987 (age 38–39); The Hague, Netherlands
- Occupation: Fashion designer
- Known for: Upcycled, avant-garde fashion
- Title: Creative director of Jean Paul Gaultier
- Awards: International Woolmark Prize (2025)

Duran Lantink (born 1987) is a Dutch fashion designer known for his avant-garde designs and focus on sustainability. He is the creative director of the French fashion house Jean Paul Gaultier, a position he assumed in 2025, and his accolades include the LVMH Prize's Karl Lagerfeld Special Jury Prize in 2024 and the International Woolmark Prize in 2025.

== Early life and education ==
Lantink was born in The Hague, Netherlands. He attended the Gerrit Rietveld Academie and later graduated from the Sandberg Instituut in Amsterdam in 2017. During his studies, he developed a distinctive style characterized by a blend of avant-garde aesthetics and environmental consciousness. Lantink has said he began reconstructing clothing as a child, cutting up and reassembling garments from his mother's wardrobe with safety pins before he had learned to sew. His graduate collection combined fabrics from several luxury labels within single garments, an upcycling approach that became central to his later work.

== Career ==
In 2018, Lantink gained recognition for designing the “vagina” trousers worn by Janelle Monáe in her "Pynk" music video. Since then, he has collaborated with artists including Beyoncé, Billie Eilish, and Doja Cat.

Lantink is noted for his emphasis on sustainability, often repurposing deadstock fabrics and pre-existing garments to create new designs. His work aims to challenge conventional fashion norms by merging diverse materials and references into unique, reconstructed pieces.

In 2023, Lantink and the Brussels-based label Ester Manas were jointly awarded the ANDAM Special Prize, which carried a cash award of €100,000. The grand prize that year went to Louis-Gabriel Nouchi.

In 2024, Lantink received the Karl Lagerfeld Special Jury Prize from LVMH. In 2025, he won the International Woolmark Prize. His autumn/winter 2025 collection, titled Duranimal and shown at Paris Fashion Week in March 2025, drew attention for looks that played with gender and the body, among them a male model wearing silicone breasts and a female model in a sculpted male torso.

In April 2025, Lantink was announced as the new creative director of the Jean Paul Gaultier brand. He is the first designer to hold the role on a permanent basis since the house's founder retired from the runway in 2020, after which the brand had presented collections by a rotating roster of guest designers. Lantink presented his debut ready-to-wear collection for the house, titled Junior, during Paris Fashion Week in October 2025, with Gaultier in attendance.

Examples of Lantink's work are held in institutional collections, including the Costume Institute of the Metropolitan Museum of Art and the Victoria and Albert Museum.
