= Transparency (trade) =

Transparency is a World Trade Organization principle stipulating that a country’s policies and regulations affecting foreign trade should be clearly communicated to its trading partners.

For example, out of recognition that sanitary and phytosanitary measures may (sometimes deliberately) be unclear, arbitrary, or capricious, recent international trading agreements have provisions calling on countries to notify others, in advance, about any measures that could affect trade, to fully explain them, and to provide a means for commenting on them.

The main provision dealing with transparency in WTO is Article X of GATT.

== Also see ==
- Transparency (behavior)
