= Jade O'Belle =

Jade O'Belle (born 1990 or 1991) is a British artist, model, and film maker.

Based in the United Kingdom, O'Belle's mother is of Indian Tamil descent, and her father has Nigerian Yoruba ancestors. Early in her career, she worked as a hairdresser. O'Belle identifies as queer.

As a model, O'Belle has worked with designers Gareth Pugh, Michaela Stark, Dimitra Petsa, and Sinéad O'Dwyer. Along with Stark and Dodo Potato, she posed for Nick Knight's 2022 3D printed fashion sculpture, Composition I. In 2023, she was featured as an "Angel" in Stark's contribution to that year's filmed Victoria's Secret Fashion Show.

In 2022 she directed her first short film, "Birthright", which stars herself. The film, which is inspired by Yoruba beliefs, uses sculpture and costume to explore feminine identity. Her film was shortlisted for "best experimental film" at the 2023 Berlin Fashion Film Festival, and was featured at the 2026 PhotoVogue Festival in Milan.

In 2026, O'Belle's form was used to sculpt some of the mannequins used in the New York Metropolitan Museum's annual Costume Institute exhibit, as part of an effort to showcase diverse bodies.
