= Mossi Traoré =

French fashion designer (born 1985)

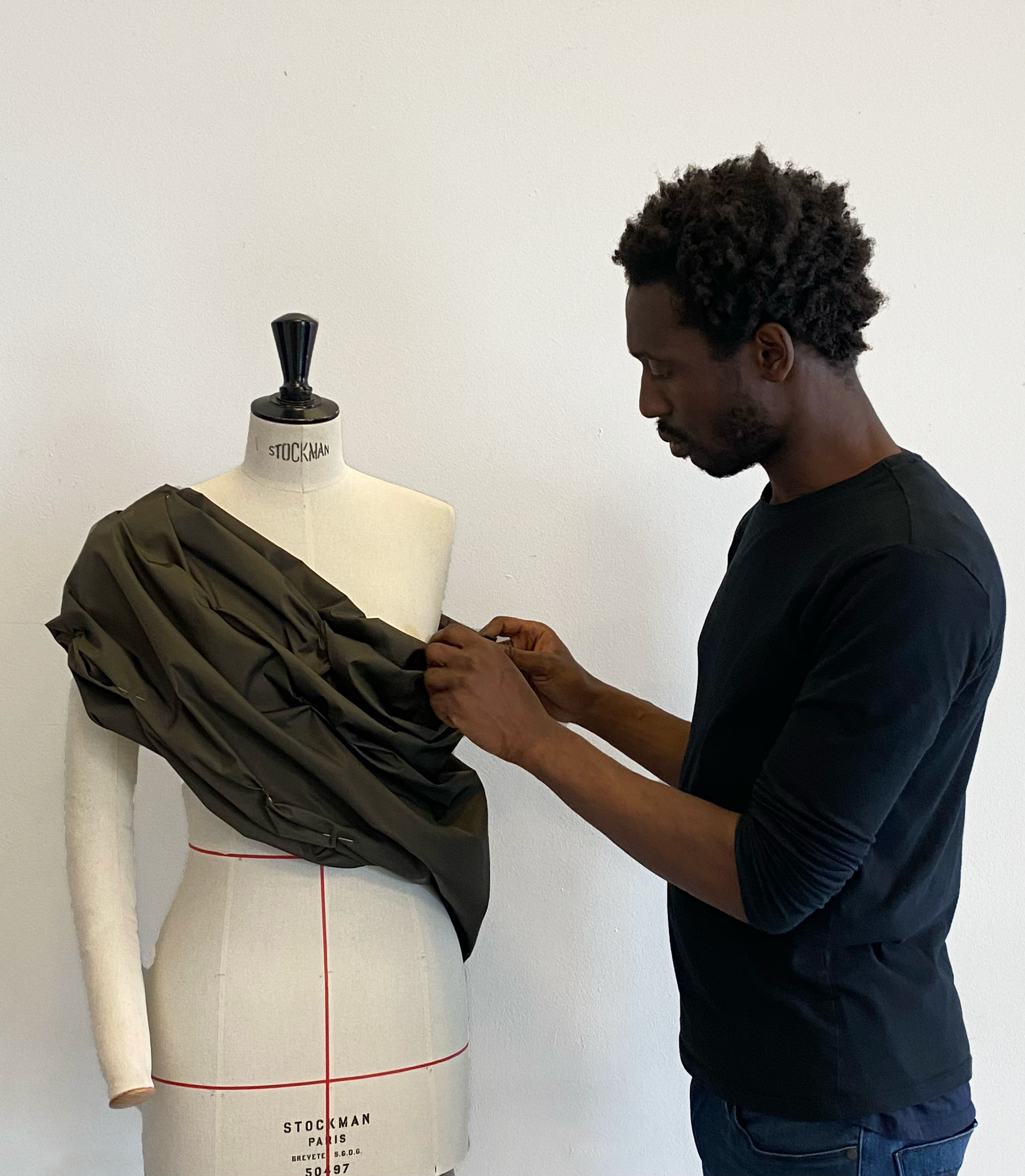
- Mossi Traoré at his atelier
- Born: May 28, 1985 (age 41); Paris, France
- Occupation: Fashion Designer
- Years active: 2011-present
- Website: Official Website

Mossi Traoré (born May 28, 1985 in Paris, France) is a French fashion designer and the founder of the Mossi fashion label.

== Early life ==
Traoré was born in the 18th arrondissement of Paris, into a modest family of Malian origin. His father was a garbage collector and his mother was a cleaning woman. He grew up in Villiers-sur-Marne, in the banlieue.

Although his mother and grandmother both practiced sewing, Traoré did not develop a passion for fashion and sewing until high school. He had a "click moment" when he applied to Mod'Art International school. "In order to validate my admission to the school, I had to read a book about the history of art that seemed like gibberish to me. However, when I was sent to see the 'Juste des vêtements' exhibit by Yohji Yamamoto at the MAD, I was captivated by the freedom to create," he said.

He dropped out of school one year before obtaining his degree. "I was working on the side and had to repay my student loan," he said.

=== Career ===
In 2011, Mossi Traoré found the phone number of fashion journalist Janie Samet, author of the book "Chère Haute Couture," in a directory. He called her to present his runway project. She introduced him to Didier Grumbach, the president of the 'Fédération de la haute couture et de la mode', who opened the doors to Paris Fashion Week for him. He did not hesitate to spend all of his savings on the runway show to "seduce potential buyers." However, this first participation in Paris Fashion Week, which was hastily prepared, was a failure. Mossi Traoré stated about it: "In two months, I had to create my company and develop a collection that was criticized. I failed. It took me a year to digest my failure."

At the start of his career, Mossi Traoré collaborated with Chinese stylist Zhen, whom he met while attending Mod'Art International. They collaborated starting in 2011 and created the brand Zhen & Mossi in 2016.

In 2017, he decided to end his collaboration with Zhen to relaunch Mossi. He stated about it, "Our visions were different, so it wasn't really me. When I relaunched the brand on my own, I wanted to start from scratch with my own codes and DNA."

== Mossi ==
In 2017, Mossi Traoré relaunched the Mossi fashion label on his own. In 2020, Mossi presented his collection for the second time during the official calendar of Paris Fashion Week. With a "Made in Banlieue" added to the brand's logo. The same year, he received the Pierre Bergé award from the 'Association nationale pour le développement des arts de la mode' (distinction awarded to fashion designers producing their collections in France with revenues below 2 million euros). He was also selected to be among the brands promoted at the SPHERE Paris Fashion Week showroom, a program launched by the 'Fédération de la haute couture et de la mode' with DEFI and L'Oréal, and which supports French designers.

=== Influences ===
Mossi Traoré is influenced by the styles of John Galliano, Giorgio Armani, and Issey Miyake. However, his greatest source of inspiration is Germaine Émilie Krebs, also known as Alix Grès or Madame Grès. During his studies, he asked a professor for advice on creating dresses inspired by the ancient period, which he admires while watching the anime Saint Seiya. This professor directed him towards Alix Grès' creations. In 2011, he visited the exhibition at the Bourdelle Museum, the first retrospective dedicated to this great couturier, until then forgotten. According to L'Obs, "Mossi was the first to be enchanted by the sumptuous work on fabric, years ago" to the point of working towards opening a museum entirely dedicated to Madame Grès in Villiers-sur-Marne.

=== Style ===
Mossi Traoré's fashion vision is described as "urban, social, and committed". He advocates for accessible fashion and defines his style as "non-conforming" with "mixed cultural inspirations".

Following the 2014 Bombay Fashion Week, he expresses his fascination with Indian cinema and the sari, a traditional garment, from which he draws a lot of inspiration. He also draws inspiration from Khādī, a traditional hand-spun and hand-woven fabric.

Mossi Traoré explains that he does not dress a woman to "make her beautiful", but instead views clothing as a "work of art". "The construction and architecture of the garment is what interests me the most today. I struggle with everything that sparkles," he says.

This aesthetic research leads him to collaborate with artists he admires. In 2019, the prints of his collection depict sculptures by Simone Pheulpin. In 2020, he collaborates with calligrapher Hassan Massoudy to explore the movement of the calligrapher in the draping of his creations. In 2021, he works with artist Lee Bae, whose work focuses on non-fossil charcoal black, which is reproduced on his creations. In 2022, he solicits Angélique to sculpt the textile and Malian painter Ibrahim Ballo for prints.

== Socially conscious designer ==
Mossi Traoré is referred to as a "committed creator". According to Vogue, "he makes fashion a means of positive social expression".

He considers himself a social entrepreneur. In 2015, he founded Les Ateliers d'Alix a school in honor of Madame Grès. His school trains in Haute couture techniques with a three-year continuing education course, workshops, and open courses for the general public to democratize sewing.

When he relaunched his brand in 2017, he built his business model around inclusion. "My leitmotiv: each dress sold would allow me to contribute to creating a job".

He says he is inspired by American entrepreneur Leila Janah because "poverty is not combated by charity but by creating employment" and Ali Banat, to rethink "the way of life by doing charitable actions".

Mossi Traoré remains attached to his neighborhood of Hautes-Noues in Villiers-sur-Marne where he established his non profit activities in 2015.

In 2021, he told the French newspaper Les Echos:

"I wanted to give young generations a chance to learn the fashion professions, embroidery, corsetry, leather crafting, photography, leather or jewelry work. [...] The school is open to all, to dropouts, those undergoing career changes, migrants awaiting asylum rights... [...] our teachers, who come from the workshops of large couture houses, are volunteers. [...] My dream would be for mothers in the neighborhood to create haute couture collections. Also, I would like to convey a positive image of the banlieue, where there are many talented people."
