= Eta Hentz =

Hungarian-American fashion designer

Eta Valer Hentz (1895–1986) was a Hungarian-American fashion designer active in the US from the 1920s to the 1940s. Mainly known as Madame Eta, she was particularly known for flattering ready-to-wear clothing inspired by Ancient Greece and the Middle Ages.

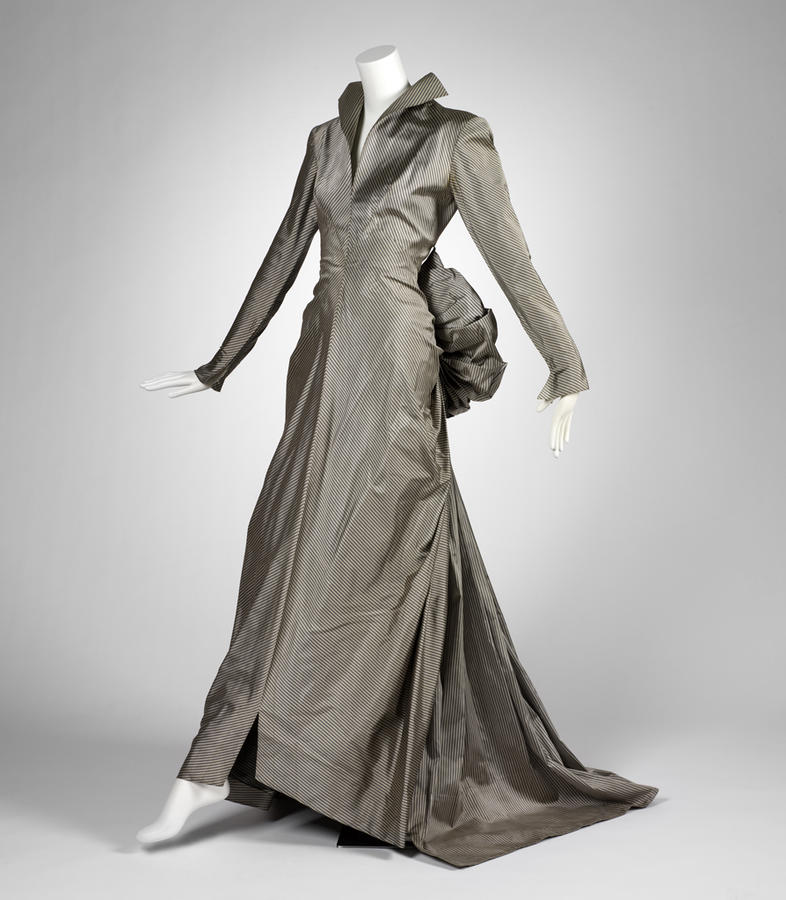
1945 Mme Eta Hentz evening dress with bustle bow

Born in Budapest, Hentz studied at the Hungarian Royal State Academy of Industrial Arts. In 1923 she launched her career in New York, when she joined the high-end ready-to-wear wholesaler Maurice Rentner. Their label Ren-Eta, ran until the late 1940s. In the late 1930s, Hentz and Ann Sadowsky launched their own company, for which Hentz produced her best-known work. She was particularly known for a 1943 collection which used ancient Greek classical themes, and other inspirations included Cape Cod and the Middle Ages for a Winter 1945 collection.

She worked in the ready-to-wear industry, creating clothes that were inventive, chic and refined, and flattering, especially for more mature women. Her work stood out from that of other American women designers for being more structured and decorative, more comparable to the work of American men designers. She was known as the "museum designer" due to her work regularly drawing influence and inspiration from historical sources and museum objects. She celebrated her 25th anniversary as a designer in July 1948, with an Autumn collection in shades of grey showing Victorian and Edwardian influences.

Hentz had an ongoing association with Stephens College. In 1957, as a "leader of the fashion industry" she helped found a costume library and reference collection at the college, and was part of the college's Fashion Advisory Board in 1967 along with Mary Brooks Picken, Adele Simpson, Vera Maxwell, Jo Copeland, Pauline Trigère, Sally Victor, and Helen Lee. In April 1970, she was part of the judging panel for the college's student fashion show.

She died in 1986. Her archives, covering the years 1933-1967 are held by the Fashion Institute of Technology, New York.
