= Rodolphe Menudier =

French shoe designer

Rodolphe Menudier is a French shoe designer.

His label was launched in 1994. Trained at the AFPIC, he rose to fame in the “back to luxury” trend using a significant dose of sex-appeal with his own brand and by creating models for Dior with John Galliano, Christian Lacroix, Balenciaga, Paco Rabanne. His Parisian boutique was inaugurated in 2000 in a set by Christophe Pillet.
