= Anthony Vaccarello =

Belgian-Italian fashion designer (born 1982)

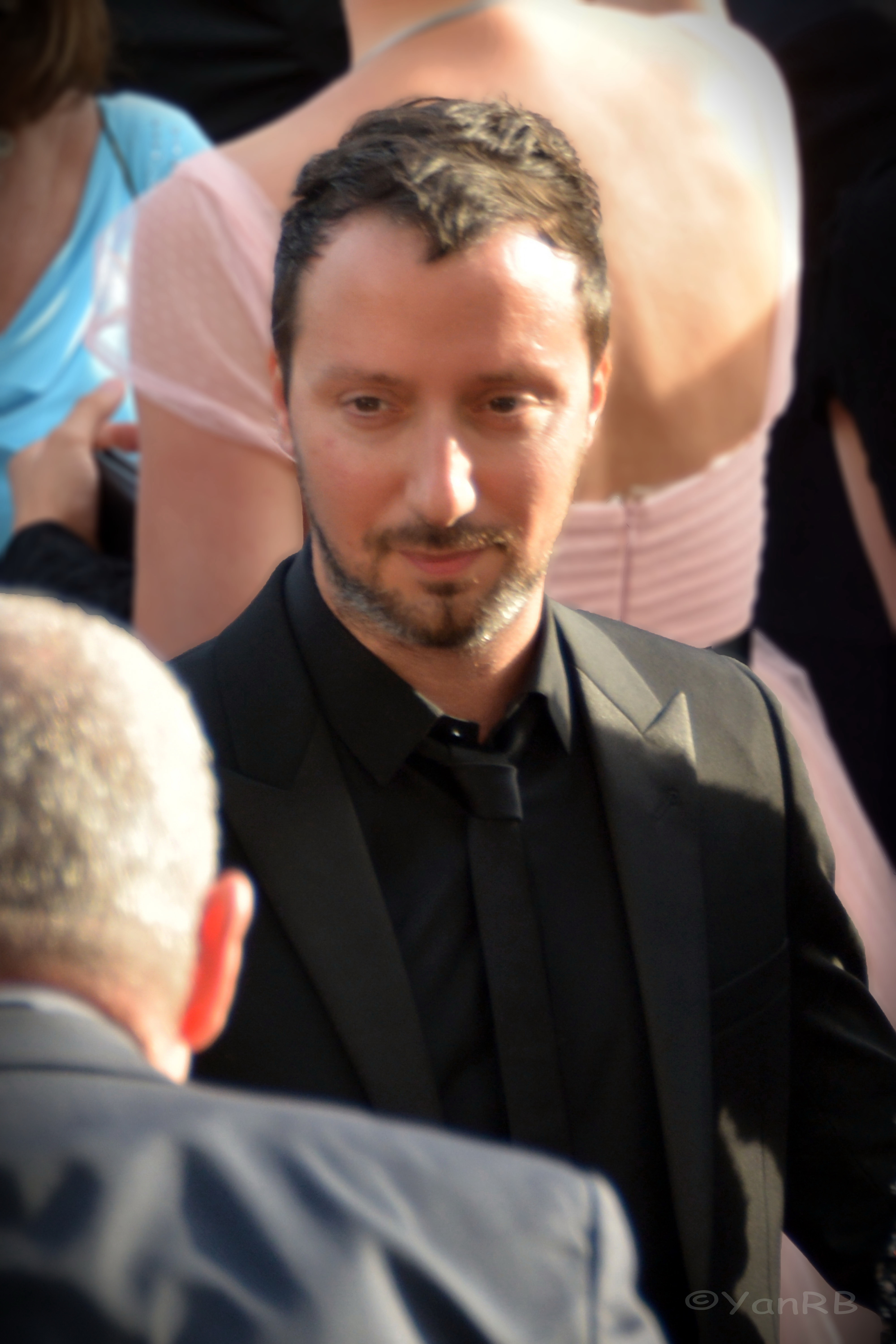
- Anthony Vaccarello in Cannes 2017
- Born: 18 January 1982 (age 44); Brussels, Belgium
- Education: La Cambre
- Years active: 2006–present
- Labels: Sua Maestà; Yves Saint Laurent
- Awards: ANDAM fashion award

Anthony Vaccarello (born 18 January 1982) is a Belgian fashion designer. He is the creative director of Yves Saint Laurent and he has designed an eponymous line too.

== Early life and education ==
Vaccarello was born on 18 January 1982 in Brussels, Belgium. He is the only child of Italian parents; his father worked as a cartongesso (plasterboard) maker and his mother was an office-worker.

Vaccarello completed one year of law school before enrolling at La Cambre in Brussels in 2000 to study sculpture. Switching to taking a fashion course at the same location, he graduated in 2006 with honors. He was inspired to change majors in school by Rei Kawakubo and Azzedine Alaïa. His graduate collection was presented at the fashion festival in Hyères southeast of Nîmes in southern France. Post presentation, Karl Lagerfeld offered him a position in fur design at Fendi.

== Career ==
Vaccarello worked under Karl Lagerfeld at Fendi for two years, specializing in fur designs. In January 2009, he moved back to Paris, making his eponymous ready-to-wear collection debut, showing five looks in the window of the Parisian boutique Maria Luisa. The collection won the 2011 ANDAM prize. Anja Rubik, a model, wore a revealing white Vaccarello dress from the same collection to the 2012 Met Gala. After an introduction to Lou Doillon at a dinner party, Doillon modelled in Vaccarello's lookbook, shot in a parking garage.

By September 2014, Vaccarello had created a capsule collection for Versus Versace. Vaccarello spent three years working for Versace, initially as a consultant and since 2015, as creative director. He created several collections for Versus until in April 2016 when it was announced that he had been appointed creative director of Saint Laurent Paris. During his first full year as creative designer at Saint Laurent, the company's income increased by 25.3 percent in revenue over 2016.

== Personal life ==
He and Anja Rubik are close friends and she agreed to walk in his A/W 2012 show.

Vaccarello is married to Arnaud Michaux, who works with him in the YSL atelier. In spring 2021, the couple announced on his Instagram account that they had a child named Luca.

== Awards and honors ==
In July 2011, he won the ANDAM Fashion Award and a €200,000 endowment.

=== Film awards and nominations ===
Year	Award	Category	Film	Result	Ref.
2024	European Film Awards	Best Film	Emilia Pérez	Won	
2024	Capri Hollywood International Film Festival	Best Picture	Emilia Pérez	Won	
2024	Capri Hollywood International Film Festival	Capri Producer Award	Emilia Pérez	Won	
2024	Hollywood Music in Media Awards	Music Themed Film, Biopic or Musical	Emilia Pérez	Won	
2025	Gold Derby Awards	Best Picture	Emilia Pérez	Nominated	
2025	Gold Derby Awards	Best International Feature	Emilia Pérez	Nominated	

== Filmography ==
Music Videos
Year	Title	Artist	Role	Note
2026	SS26	Charli XCX	Himself	
