= Marine Serre =

French fashion designer (born 1991)

- Born: December 13, 1991 (age 34); Brive-la-Gaillarde, France
- Education: La Cambre
- Occupation: Fashion Designer
- Website: http://marineserre.com

Marine Serre (born December 13, 1991) is a French fashion designer and sustainability advocate. She won the 2017 LVMH Prize for Young Fashion Designers.

== Early life ==
Serre was born in Brive-la-Gaillarde near Corrèze, France. She studied in Marseille and after two years she moved to Belgium, to attend La Cambre, from where she graduated with high honours in 2016. Serre quickly developed an interest in fashion at a young age. Her interest was cultivated at La Cambre Mode(s) Belgian Fashion Design Academy, an institution renowned for establishing some of the industry's most creative talents.

== Career ==
Serre's graduation show "Radical Call For Love" in 2016 sparked the interest of international stores such as The Broken Arm and Dover Street Market. This collection debuted the crescent moon motif that has become a signature for her brand. After graduating from La Cambre, she held internships working under Sarah Burton at Alexander McQueen, Matthieu Blazy at Maison Margiela and Raf Simons at Dior. She worked in Paris for a year as a designer for Balenciaga while also working on her own line.

Serre made her runway debut in February 2018 in Paris. Her collections have been met with critical and commercial acclaim, and her brand is stocked internationally at Dover Street Market, Nordstrom, SSENSE, and more. Her work focuses on innovation and sustainability, with a minimum of 50% of her collection consisting of upcycled material, such as old lace table cloths and vintage silk scarves. In 2019 she became the first to collaborate with an air-filtration mask company to produce her branded air purifying masks. For Vogue World in Paris, Serre designed a custom outfit for Venus Williams using repurposed tennis bags. Serre connected the commission to her own teenage years as a competitive tennis player, when such bags were part of her daily equipment. The structured garment was produced over several hundred hours in her Paris atelier and preserved piping and embroidery from the original bags.

Numerous celebrities have been seen wearing Marine Serre, including Kylie Jenner, A$AP Rocky, Yung Miami, and Beyoncé. In particular, Beyoncé wore a catsuit from the line in her 2020 Black is King project and commissioned a custom catsuit for her 2023 Renaissance World Tour.

Serre is known for her innovative approach to luxury fashion. Her designs, which frequently incorporate recycled materials, address global issues and challenge traditional notions of luxury. Serre's work is highlighted for its technological forward-thinking and its commitment to blending art, functionality, and environmental consciousness. Her work is considered a prime example of eco futurist ideology in fashion. Her latest collection showcases filmed vignettes of people wearing her repurposed garments while engaging in everyday activities.

To support her innovative supply chain, Serre employs over 70 people who assist in sourcing and reworking deadstock materials. Her efforts aim to prove that the fashion industry can adopt a supply chain model based on regeneration, challenging the traditional practices of wasteful production.

In 2025 Marine Serre releases "Heads or Tails" a film for her Fall/Winter 2025 collection, a hybrid film blending runway presentation and experimental cinema.

In June 2025, she presented her Spring 2026 collection in a gallery instead of staging a runway show. It included garments made from upcycled silk scarves and repurposed deadstock polyester.

In October 2025, Serre opened her first stand-alone boutique in Seoul, South Korea.

Her Fall 2026 ready-to-wear collection, The Grace of Time, was accompanied by five couture pieces made in collaboration with the Louvre. The pieces incorporated reused objects including makeup brushes, paint tubes and watch parts.

She released a capsule of performance wear with Under Armour.

In July 2026, the Paris Commercial Court placed Marine Serres' label parent company into redressement judiciaire, a French court-supervised restructuring procedure. The company attributed its cash-flow pressure to payment defaults by several clients during 2025, weak consumer spending and rising costs. It remained operational and began seeking an investor. Later that month, Shakira wore Serre's jersey set in the label's signature crescent-moon print during 2026 FIFA World Cup final.

== Impact on the fashion industry ==
Serre's work addresses the environmental impact of the fashion industry, a sector often criticized for its unsustainable practices. While many large brands market themselves as "sustainable", these efforts are often limited and serve as marketing tools rather than substantive reform. In contrast, Serre integrates sustainability into her design practice and business model from the ground up. She has created a model for what it means to be an environmentally conscious luxury brand, and has proven that the two concepts and models can co-exist.

== Public image ==
In June 2017, during the award ceremony of the LVMH Prize for Young Fashion Designers, Karl Lagerfeld, who was a member of the jury, described Marine Serre as: "One-meter-fifty, but a will of steel.". Serre is often described as intensely focused and disciplined, traits she attributes to her early career as a high-level tennis player. She trained for over thirteen years and nearly qualified for the French Open before ultimately deciding to pursue fashion full-time.
