= Peter Do =

American fashion designer (born 1990)

- Born: 1990; Biên Hòa, Vietnam
- Education: Fashion Institute of Technology
- Labels: Peter Do; PD-168; Helmut Lang

Peter Do (born 1990) is an American fashion designer. He was the creative director of the brand Helmut Lang from 2023 to 2024. He founded his eponymous label in 2018 and its offshoot, PD-168, in 2025.

== Life and career ==
Do was born in Biên Hòa, Vietnam, and moved to Philadelphia at age 14. He attended the Fashion Institute of Technology in New York City, and graduated in 2014, winning the LVMH Graduate Prize. Afterwards, he worked at Phoebe Philo’s Celine and then at Derek Lam. Do frequently wears a cloth face mask.

=== Eponymous label ===
He started his own eponymous label in 2018. His designs were worn by Zendaya and Beyoncé.

=== Helmut Lang ===
In May 2023, Peter Do was announced as the new creative director of Helmut Lang. He officially debuted his Spring/Summer 2024 collection for the brand in September 2023 at New York Fashion Week, presenting a vision of accessible, high-quality wardrobe staples rooted in practical luxury. The collection received mixed reviews. In developing the collection, Do spent its first three months reconstructing the label's foundational patterns for garments such as shirts and trousers. His intention was to retain those base patterns in later seasons so that fit would remain consistent while individual designs changed. He also described New York's relationship to everyday clothing as central to his interpretation of the brand. In a review for The Cut, Cathy Horyn describing it as "devoid of meaning", and compared the collection to Helmut Lang's sister company, Uniqlo. In a review for The New York Times, Vanessa Friedman said that the collection was "accomplished, accessible, and very commercial", but that it was missing the "subversion" found in the collections made when Helmut Lang was creative director. In a review for Washington Post, Rachel Tashjian said that his debut "stole the show", and that the collection was "raw [...] and precise". Do left Helmut Lang in November 2024.

=== PD-168 ===
A more affordable offshoot label, PD-168, was launched by Do in September 2025. He only uses three fabrics across the line — cotton terry, supple jersey, and Japanese ‘liquid satin’ — all of which are machine-washable.
