= Lukhanyo Mdingi =

South African fashion designer (born 1992)

- Born: 1992 (age 33–34); East London, South Africa
- Education: Cape Peninsula University of Technology
- Label: Lukhanyo Mdingi
- Awards: Karl Lagerfeld Prize, LVMH Prize (2021); Amiri Prize (2023)
- Website: lukhanyomdingi.co.za

Lukhanyo Mdingi (born 1992) is a South African fashion designer based in Cape Town. In 2015 he founded his eponymous label, which makes men's and women's clothing in collaboration with artisan communities in South Africa and elsewhere on the continent, among them weavers in Khayelitsha and textile artisans in Burkina Faso. He was one of the three winners of the Karl Lagerfeld Prize at the 2021 LVMH Prize, becoming the second South African to receive a prize from the group after Thebe Magugu, and he won the Amiri Prize in 2023.

== Early life and education ==
Mdingi was born in 1992 and grew up in East London, a coastal town in South Africa's Eastern Cape province. The youngest of a large family, he was raised by his mother and grandmother among strong Xhosa women. He has said that he wanted to be a designer for as long as he can remember, and that his early interest in fashion came from television, including the soap opera The Bold and the Beautiful and media coverage of Versace and the supermodels of the 1990s.

Mdingi studied fashion design at the Cape Peninsula University of Technology in Cape Town, graduating with a BTech degree in 2014. While completing the degree he worked as a waiter and interned with stylists, photographers, art directors, designers, and retailers. In 2013 he was a finalist in the Elle Rising Star Design Award, for which he designed his first collection, "Basics"; the award was won by Nicholas Coutts, a fellow finalist who became a close friend. His graduate collection, "Granite", used wiring, upholstery, and Mylar polyester sheets to construct blazers and hats, and led SA Menswear Week to scout him to produce a collection for its 2015 edition.

== Career ==
=== Founding the label ===
Mdingi founded his eponymous label in Cape Town in 2015. Its first collection was "Macramé", a casual capsule in muted greys, navys, and whites shown at SA Menswear Week in 2015. It was followed by "Taintless" (Spring/Summer 2016), a genderless collection of sheer navy pieces. In 2016 Mdingi and Coutts presented a joint collection at Pitti Uomo in Florence and at SA Menswear Week. The label later appeared in the British Fashion Council's International Fashion Showcase, and its "Perennial" collection debuted at New York Fashion Week in February 2019.

=== Coutts collection and LVMH Prize ===
Coutts died in May 2019, and Mdingi decided to commemorate him through a collection, asking the Coutts family for permission to work from his textiles and archive. He learned to weave from Coutts's mother, Lindsay, who had taught her son, and used Coutts's hand loom to make oversized two-meter scarves combining mohair, wool, alpaca, and lurex. The resulting "Coutts" collection debuted at Pitti Uomo on February 9, 2021, in an edition held largely online because of the COVID-19 pandemic. It later served as his entry for the LVMH Prize.

In 2020 Mdingi was one of five African designers chosen for the Ethical Fashion Initiative's first accelerator program. At the 2021 LVMH Prize, announced at the Fondation Louis Vuitton in Paris on September 7, 2021, Nensi Dojaka won the main prize, while the jury awarded the Karl Lagerfeld Prize to three designers at once: Mdingi, Colm Dillane of Kidsuper, and Rui Zhou of Rui. Each of the three received €150,000 and a year of mentorship from LVMH. Mdingi was the second South African to win a prize from the group, after Thebe Magugu in 2019. Also in 2021, the label joined Net-a-Porter's Vanguard mentorship program.

=== Paris Fashion Week and the Amiri Prize ===
In January 2022 Mdingi made his Paris Fashion Week debut with "Bodyland" (Fall/Winter 2022), the first presentation on the official schedule; the collection used woven textiles and knitwear made with craft communities in Burkina Faso, Somalia, and the Eastern Cape. For "Bridges" (Spring/Summer 2022), the label began working with Cabes Gie, a textile community in Burkina Faso, on indigenous dyeing techniques, and collaborated with Cape Town artist Jeanne Gaigher. His Spring 2023 men's collection, "Burkina", was named after the Cabes community and was shown in Paris in June 2022. In 2022 the label also began a retail partnership with Saks Fifth Avenue.

In May 2022 Mdingi was named one of the seven finalists for the grand prize of the 2022 ANDAM Fashion Awards. In October 2023 he won the second edition of the Amiri Prize, founded by Los Angeles designer Mike Amiri, ahead of eight other finalists; the prize carries a $100,000 grant and a year of mentorship with Amiri.

== Design approach ==
Mdingi's collections use materials such as merino wool, kid mohair, and silk, worked through weaving, hand-knitting, and felting carried out with artisan communities, among them the Philani weavers of Khayelitsha in Cape Town, Cabes Gie in Burkina Faso, and weavers in Kenya. He has described the label's aim as building a timeless wardrobe, telling interviewers that he wants the work to have "a sense of soulfulness" and to resist trend-driven fashion. Reviewing the "Burkina" presentation for Vogue, Sarah Mower wrote that Mdingi's Paris show demonstrated how the techniques of African artisans can hold a central place in contemporary designer fashion. Mdingi styles the label's lookbooks and presentations himself.
