= Amiri =

Iranian-American luxury fashion house

AMIRI

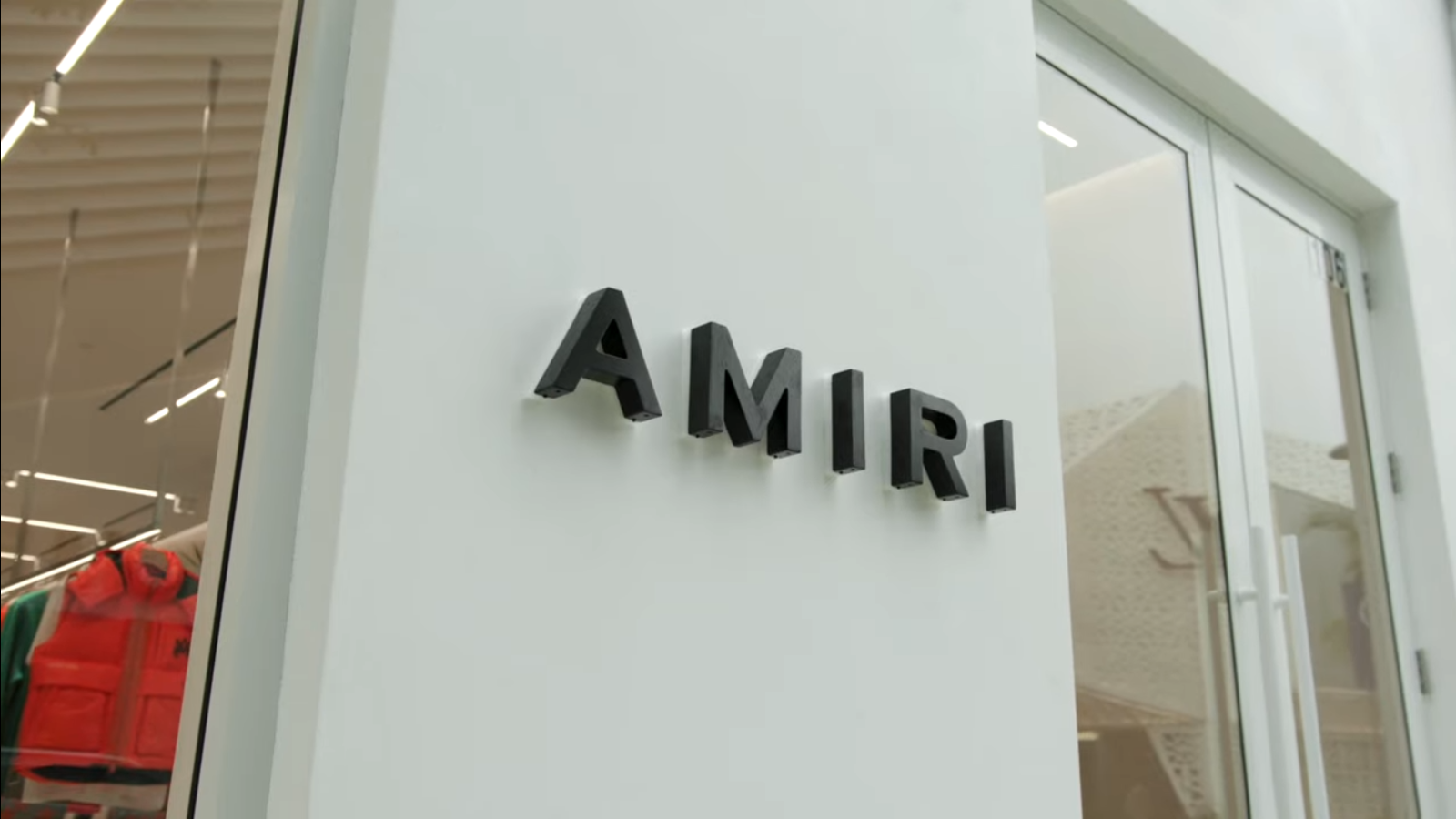
- Miami flagship store
- Type: Private
- Industry: Fashion
- Founded: 2014; 12 years ago
- Founder: Mike Amiri
- Headquarters: Los Angeles, California, U.S.
- Number of locations: 195 stores worldwide (2026)
- Key people: Adrian Ward-Rees (CEO)
- Products: Clothing; Footwear
- Revenue: $300 million (2025)
- Owner: Mike Amiri (majority); OTB Group (minority)
- Website: amiri.com

Amiri (Note: Persian: امیری) (stylized in all caps) is an American luxury fashion house founded in 2014 by Mike Amiri and is headquartered in Los Angeles, California, U.S. The current CEO of Amiri is Adrian Ward-Rees, who was appointed as CEO on April 1, 2023. According to Vogue, Amiri reported $300 million in revenue in 2025.

Amiri is available in over 160 retailers worldwide, including Bergdorf Goodman in New York, Neiman Marcus in Beverly Hills, Galeries Lafayette in Paris, Selfridges and Harrods in London, Harvey Nichols in Dubai, and Lane Crawford in Hong Kong and mainland China. As of 2023, Amiri has standalone flagship stores in Beverly Hills, New York, Las Vegas, Miami, Chicago, Houston, Atlanta, New Delhi, Shanghai, Tokyo, Nanjing, and Dubai.

== History ==
Amiri was founded in 2014 by Iranian-American fashion designer Mike Amiri. Mike Amiri credited Barneys New York with supporting the brand in its early stages.

In 2018, Amiri showed for the first time at Paris Fashion Week. The brand has presented bi-annual collections in Paris each year. Vogue Runway has noted that the brand's presence at Paris Fashion Week indicates its presence in the global luxury market. In February 2022, Amiri presented a runway show in Los Angeles in collaboration with the contemporary American artist, Wes Lang.

In 2019, OTB Group, founded by Renzo Rosso, acquired a minority stake in Amiri. In 2020, Amiri opened its first flagship store on Rodeo Drive, Beverly Hills.

In 2021, Amiri launched the Amiri Prize, an initiative to support emerging fashion designers. The inaugural prize winner was Philadelphia-based fashion brand Lou Badger. The winner of The Amiri Prize in 2023 was the South African designer Lukhanyo Mdingi.

On April 1, 2023, Amiri appointed Adrian Ward-Rees, the former senior vice president at Burberry and managing director of Dior Menswear, as chief executive officer.

On January 9, 2026, it was announced that Japanese singer Yuta Jinguji, from the group Number i was appointed as Amiri's new global ambassador. Regarding his appointment as ambassador, Jinguji commented, "Fashion is a passion of mine, and also a powerful means of communication as a performer. Style is always a reflection of who I am, a way to express my individuality, creativity, and identity. I am very much looking forward to working alongside Amiri, a brand I have loved dearly, and Mike Amiri, whom I respect, as a global ambassador."
