= Torishéju Dumi =

British fashion designer

- Born: 1992 or 1993 (age 33–34); Harlesden, London, United Kingdom
- Education: London College of Fashion; Central Saint Martins
- Label: Torishéju
- Awards: Savoir-Faire Prize, LVMH Prize (2025)
- Website: torisheju.com

Torishéju Dumi is a British fashion designer and the founder of the eponymous Torishéju fashion label. She made her Paris Fashion Week debut in October 2023 with a show opened by Naomi Campbell, and won the Savoir-Faire Prize at the 2025 LVMH Prize.

== Early life and education ==
Dumi was born in the Harlesden neighborhood of London to Nigerian-Brazilian parents. Her father died when she was fourteen, and she lived with her mother, brother, and sister in Hertfordshire and Milton Keynes. She was raised Catholic.

Before studying fashion, Dumi took a one-year fashion design course at De Montfort University. She graduated with a bachelor's degree in menswear from the London College of Fashion in 2018, and completed a master's degree at Central Saint Martins in 2021.

== Career ==
Dumi interned for Phoebe Philo during the latter's tenure at Celine, and at Ann Demeulemeester in Antwerp. Her Central Saint Martins graduate collection caught the attention of fashion editor Gabriella Karefa-Johnson, who would become a mentor for Dumi.

The first collection from Dumi's Torishéju fashion line, the capsule "Mami Wata", was released in early 2023. Dumi made its deadstock pieces at home in her spare time, while working on the costume course at the London College of Fashion. In October of that year, she held a show at Paris Fashion Week, where she was the only Black woman to debut a collection. Titled "Fire on the Mountain", the show was opened by Naomi Campbell and closed by Paloma Elsesser.

Dumi appeared alongside Priya Ahluwalia and Tolu Coker on the January 2024 cover of British Vogue; the three were recognized for their efforts to promote sustainability in the fashion industry.

In February 2024, stylist Law Roach put Zendaya in a custom Torishéju look based on the Spring 2024 collection for a Dune: Part Two photocall in Mexico City, the label's first red carpet appearance. The Metropolitan Museum of Art acquired seven of Dumi's pieces for its permanent collection, two of which were included in the 2024 exhibition Sleeping Beauties: Reawakening Fashion. The label was soon stocked by Dover Street Market.

Dumi showed her Spring 2025 collection at Paris Fashion Week in October 2024, with support from Diego Della Valle and the Virgil Abloh Foundation. In July 2025, she received an honorary doctorate from Central Saint Martins, University of the Arts London.

That September, at the 2025 LVMH Prize, she won the Savoir-Faire Prize, which came with a €200,000 grant and a year of mentorship from LVMH. In October 2025, she showed the Spring 2026 collection "Dürer", named after the German Renaissance artist Albrecht Dürer, with Campbell again opening the show.
