= Vejas Kruszewski =

Canadian fashion designer

- Born: 1997 (age 27–28); Montreal, Canada
- Occupation: Fashion designer
- Years active: 2014–present

Vejas Kruszewski (born 1997) is a Canadian fashion designer and the founder of the gender-neutral fashion label Vejas. He rose to international prominence in 2016 as the youngest recipient of a special prize at the LVMH Prize for Young Designers.

== Early life ==
Kruszewski was born in Montreal, Canada, and is of Polish and Lithuanian descent. A self-taught designer, he began sewing at the age of ten, learning techniques from YouTube tutorials and Japanese sewing magazines. He also deconstructed garments from brands like Céline and Miu Miu to learn their construction.

== Career ==
=== Vejas (2014–2016) ===
Kruszewski launched his label Vejas in 2014 at age 17. His first collection debuted in Fall 2015 in a New York gallery with models including Hari Nef. His early work featured gender-neutral silhouettes and a futuristic twist on familiar staples, such as bomber jackets restructured into cargo pants.

=== LVMH Prize (2016) ===
In 2016, Kruszewski won a special prize at the LVMH Prize for Young Designers at age 19, receiving €150,000 and one year of mentorship. He remains the youngest recipient of any LVMH Prize category.

=== Pihakapi and further work (2018–present) ===
In 2018, Kruszewski became creative director of the leatherwear brand Pihakapi, under the Italian luxury group Pellemoda. The brand combines artisanal leather with knitwear and experimental materials.

In 2021, Kruszewski relaunched his namesake line with a collection inspired by science fiction films including Alien, Gattaca, and Blade Runner.

== Design philosophy ==
Kruszewski’s work is noted for blending historical craftsmanship with speculative futurism. He cites influences such as Madame Grès, Phoebe Philo, Azzedine Alaïa, Constantin Brâncuși, and Isamu Noguchi. He describes his garments as “familiar but alien,” merging technical detail with non-binary design.

== Personal life ==
Kruszewski is based between Montreal, Toronto, and Paris.
