= Rok Hwang =

South Korean fashion designer

- Born: Seoul, South Korea
- Education: Central Saint Martins (BA, MA)
- Label: Rokh
- Awards: Special Prize, LVMH Prize (2018)

Rok Hwang (Korean: 황록) is a South Korean fashion designer based in London. He is the founder and creative director of the label Rokh, which he established in 2016 after several years as a designer for Céline under Phoebe Philo. In 2018 he won the Special Prize of the LVMH Prize for Young Fashion Designers, and in 2019 he was added to the BoF 500 index of industry figures. His label, known for deconstructed and adaptable reworkings of wardrobe classics such as the trench coat, made its runway debut at Paris Fashion Week in 2019, and in 2024 he designed a collection for H&M.

== Early life and education ==
Hwang was born in Seoul, South Korea, and raised in Austin, Texas, where his father, an economist, was studying; for a time the family lived in a caravan. He returned to South Korea to finish school, then moved to the United Kingdom at the age of 18, living in Nottingham before moving to London in 2004. He has said that music, rather than fashion, first drew him to the UK.

Hwang took a foundation course at Central Saint Martins, where he went on to earn a BA in menswear and an MA in womenswear, training under the course director Louise Wilson, who persuaded him to switch to womenswear. In 2009 he won first prize for the school's graduate collections.

== Career ==
=== Early career ===
After graduating, Hwang joined Céline in Paris, where he worked under Phoebe Philo as a ready-to-wear designer on her debut collection for the house. He stayed at Céline for three years, then worked as a freelance designer for Chloé and Louis Vuitton.

=== Founding Rokh ===
Hwang founded Rokh in London in 2016. The label launched for the Fall/Winter 2017 season with reconstructed acetate skirts, draped silk panel dresses and double-breasted wool overcoats with removable sleeves, and was picked up by retailers including Leclaireur, Lane Crawford and KM20. By December 2017, in its second season, Rokh had 42 stockists, its clothes had appeared in Self Service and M, Le Magazine du Monde, and the company employed a team of ten working from a north London studio.

=== LVMH Prize ===
In 2018, Hwang was one of nine finalists for the LVMH Prize for Young Fashion Designers. On June 6, 2018, at the Louis Vuitton Foundation in Paris, he was awarded the runner-up Special Prize, presented by Jaden Smith; the grand prize went to Masayuki Ino of the Tokyo label Doublet. The Special Prize carried a grant of €150,000 and a year of mentorship from the LVMH group. Jury member Nicolas Ghesquière praised Hwang's development of the label, which had caught a scout's attention through Instagram, and compared his determination to that of the previous year's winner, Marine Serre. Delphine Arnault said the jury had been "seduced by his silhouettes that are feminine, sensual and conquering, and by his mastery of complex cuts".

=== Paris Fashion Week debut ===
Rokh made its runway debut on February 25, 2019, opening Paris Fashion Week with a show staged in the basement of a former Monoprix supermarket. The Fall/Winter 2019 collection was titled "Teenage Nightmare" after Hwang's adolescence in Austin; he has named the work of Larry Clark and Gus Van Sant as early inspirations. By then the label had around 100 stockists, and Net-a-Porter, which had carried Rokh since Resort 2018, had increased its inventory of the label by nearly 60 percent the previous year. Hwang also introduced a shoulder bag, the File, produced in the same Spanish factory as Loewe, and his first shoe styles with the Fall/Winter 2019 collection.

=== Collaborations ===
In 2023, Canada Goose released an eight-piece capsule collection with Rokh and the artist Matt McCormick for Fall/Winter 2023, combining shapes from Rokh's "Office Essentials" line with McCormick's imagery of the American West; it went on sale on September 7, 2023.

In March 2024, H&M announced Rokh as its next designer collaboration partner. The 58-piece collection, spanning womenswear, menswear and accessories, reworked Rokh signatures such as the double-layer trench coat, detachable-hem dresses and the double belt. Ann-Sofie Johansson, H&M's creative advisor, described Rokh as "at the forefront of a new wave of Korean designers whose conceptual-yet-wearable clothes are captivating fashion right now". H&M marked the collaboration with an event at the Dongdaemun Design Plaza in Seoul on April 12, 2024, where the rapper CL performed, and the collection went on sale on April 18, 2024.

=== Recent collections ===
For Spring/Summer 2025, Hwang shredded recycled ribbons, cotton and linens into thin threads and rearranged them into floral clusters, a turn toward handwork following the H&M collaboration. His Fall/Winter 2025 collection took the British studio potter Lucie Rie as a reference and paired rigorous cuts with draped elements and hand-shredded ruffles. By 2025, menswear accounted for around 20 percent of Rokh's business.

== Design approach ==
Rokh's clothes rework familiar garments: deconstructed trench coats, and traditional menswear fabrics cut into feminine silhouettes. Hwang has said he thinks of the process as reconstruction rather than deconstruction: "I like taking something that already exists and giving it new shape and meaning." Many pieces are made to be adjusted by the wearer: coats and trousers can be unbuttoned from the hem, and double-layered sleeves can be pushed up and tied on the upper arm. The trench coat, cut oversized and relaxed with tied sleeves that extend over the hand, became the label's signature piece. Fabrics are developed in-house and are the starting point of each collection.

Hwang has described the woman he designs for as "a little fragile, someone who is not that confident", and in the label's early collections models appeared with their faces covered.
