= Designing Hope =

French non-governmental organization

Dessine l'Espoir
- Founded: April 27th, 2003
- Founder: Cyrille Varet
- Headquarters: Paris, France
- Website: https://dessinelespoir.fr

Dessine l'Espoir, or in English, Designing Hope, is a French NGO founded on April 27, 2003, in Paris. The association has focused its efforts on HIV prevention, artists' mobilization, promoting social inclusion, and improving nutrition. Its programs are driven in countries in Africa, concentrated in Southern Africa. Designing Hope has therefore aimed at developing North–South relationships, directing French aid towards countries like Lesotho, Burkina Faso, and South Africa.

Designing Hope has built a list of ambitious objectives to help communities in Africa. These goals include:

- Raising funds for vulnerable people in Southern Africa.
- Developing initiatives to fight against discrimination and exclusion, and using art as a means of prevention.
- Raising awareness about healthy nutrition and providing access to healthy food.
- Promoting agricultural techniques.

== Funding ==
Designing Hope uses a combination of private donations, partnerships, and commercial collaborations. The organization also raises money through a "solidarity boutique" that sells items produced by its beneficiaries, such as lucky charms or other artisanal crafts.

=== Focus on self-sufficiency ===
The NGO focuses strongly on implementing programs designed to encourage self-sufficiency on a long-term basis. This relates to their goal of reaching food and economic security for selected communities. Thus, this objective is primarily achieved through permaculture and income-generating activities.

Designing Hope has been developing "educational gardens" (such as the Transjardins platform) that provide nutritional support but also teach sustainable farming techniques to local communities. This allows Designing Hope's beneficiaries to access healthy food, but it is also a way to sell what they produce in order to raise funds and reach local self-sufficiency.

The NGO implemented training programs, such as sewing training and other areas of work, allowing beneficiaries (particularly women living with HIV in Eswatini and Lesotho) to produce goods that they can later sell or reuse within the organization. For instance, Women in Malanti (Eswatini) sew school uniforms as part of their training, which are later distributed to orphans in South Africa (as part of Designing Hope's program in Roosboom).

=== Main partnerships ===
Designing Hope collaborates with various organizations, including:

- Le Bon Marché Rive Gauche, which has supported the Porte-Bonheurs operation and the funding of the Jardin des Savoir-Faire (Garden of Skills) in Eswatini.
- The City of Paris. The NGO was a winner of the "Parisculteurs" initiative, which helped them in the creation of the "Jardin de la Traversine" on a school rooftop in the 12th arrondissement of Paris.
- UNESCO, who has partnered together with Designing Hope and Art Paris on HIV/AIDS prevention campaigns through the "Artists4Life" program.
- Designing Hope also receives the help of several sponsors, which help reach the NGO's goals, among which we can find: the Ivory Foundation, la Fondation Raja, la Fondation d'Entreprise AirFrance, the AA Ulmann Foundation, and many others.

=== Designing Hope and its strong link to the Arts ===
Designing Hope has a strong focus on art and design, which are used to create income-generating activities:

- Through the "Fashion Designing Hope" initiative, the NGO mobilizes international designers to create exclusive items (such as lightbulbs) which raise funds through public auctions and sales retrocessions. These collaborations serve as vital income-generating activities for women in local projects, who gain financial independence by producing these items.
- Thus, the NGO has develops partnerships with international designers, such as Thebe Magugu, Agnès b., and Christian Lacroix, who provide original designs or patterns to the organization for free.
- The finished products (such as Porte Bonheurs flowers (lucky charms), textiles, and decorative items) are also sold through the organization's online boutique and in partner stores such as Le Bon Marché in Paris.
- Original artworks created by artists for campaigns like "Artists4Life" are occasionally sold at public auctions (such as those held at the Grand Palais in Paris) to raise funding for big infrastructure projects, such as the construction of classrooms or community gardens.

== Main Programs ==
=== Global Actions Redirecting its Forces Towards South Countries ===
==== 'Artists4Life' ====
Artists4life is a long-term project initiated by Designing Hope in 2005. It engages with international and African artists to fight stigma surrounding HIV and AIDS. It uses art as an awareness tool and promotes the "I Love You Positive or Negative" campaign to advocate for support and love, regardless of HIV status.

This campaign has circulated over several countries, including France, Burkina Faso and Mozambique. For instance, Designing Hope organized an exhibition in 2006 where artists from Maputo exhibited their work at the Franco-Mozambican Culture Center, or a similar operation at the Alliance française of Johannesburg.

The project's prestige is reflected in its participants, who are made up of global icons like Karl Lagerfeld, Joël Andrianomearisoa, Jane Evelyn Atwood, and Julie Mehretu. These artists helped dismantle the stigma associated with the virus, promoting a message of support to HIV-positive people.

Since 2006, over a hundred artists have committed alongside Designing Hope. The participation of Cristina Owen Jones, UNESCO Goodwill Ambassador in charge of HIV and AIDS, played a great deal in the expansion of the project. Another major partnership was made with Art Paris, a fair dedicated to modern and contemporary art in Paris' Grand Palais, between 2006 and 2013.

One of its latest projects related to the arts is the participation in an immersive exhibition, hosted at Le Bon Marché in Paris, and organized by Thebe Magugu, a South African designer. This exhibition consisted in 20 000 handmade flowers suspended in the air, and crafted by 120 women from Dessine l'Espoir.

==== Transjardins et Traversine ====
Transjardins is a branch of Designing Hope that is dedicated to educational and experimental gardens, leading to initiatives in six countries: Eswatini, Lesotho, South Africa, Senegal, Burkina Faso, and France. These gardens aim at being places of training and learning about Agroecology and Permaculture, even though each garden has its specific vocation. These gardens are also a tool in community empowerment.

For example, Levi's New Pedagogical Farm in Lesotho aims at raising awareness of agricultural trades among deaf and hard-of-hearing young people. At this farm, the NGO has overseen the construction of individual housing for its most autonomous residents, guiding them towards adulthood. The youth have also constructed greenhouses to ensure year-round production.

Similarly, La Traversine was launched in 2017 as part of the Parisculteurs initiative. It is an educational garden located in the 12th arrondissement of Paris, serving as "agri-cultural" bridges, using sustainable techniques to teach local children about biodiversity and nutrition while fostering exchanges with the other gardens projects (Transjardins) across Southern Africa.

==== Educational games ====
The branch of Designing Hope, Transjardins, presents a collection of nine educational games, such as memory games, dominoes, and recipe-matching. They were designed by the NGO for children to learn about agriculture, nutrition, and biodiversity. Some components are even produced by women in Eswatini, reinforcing the project's social impact.

Additionally, Designing Hope developed a board game called Jeu de la Biodiversité (or biodiversity game). It is available in school and family versions, and teaches children about environmental issues such as climate change, deforestation, and overfishing.

=== Actions in Eswatini ===
Eswatini has been one of the main centers of action for Designing Hope. Indeed, the country used to be one of the epicenters of the HIV epidemic, requiring special help in order to cope with the sanitary situation. According to UNAIDS, nearly 1 in 3 adults in Eswatini was living with HIV in 2015.

HIV was mainly affecting women and teenage girls, explaining why Designing Hope's program in Eswatini focuses especially on empowering women living with HIV. The situation has improved since 2015, mainly thanks to the Eswatini Ministry of Health and their Eswatini National AIDS Program (SNAP), which takes care of HIV prevention, free HIV testing, as well as care and treatment. Nevertheless, Designing Hope's action is still key to local development in the selected communities.

Because of this critical health situation, Designing Hope started acting in the country in 2005. The first thing they did was providing nutritional support in the region, with the distribution of meals to HIV positive people from the Piggs Peak Hospital (Eswatini).

Today, Designing Hope mainly focuses on three programs in order to reach the NGO's objectives in Eswatini:

- The Sewing Program, which provides sewing training for the women from the Malanti community (Eswatini). It promotes women's empowerment by enabling participants to develop professional skills, while also supporting the production of school uniforms for children in need from several schools neighboring the Malanti community.
- Le Jardin des Savoir-Faire (Garden of Skills), which provides fresh vegetables all year-long for people in need. It allows to educate about nutrition and support health programs, such as the distribution of food to HIV-positive individuals at the Piggs Peak Hospital.
- The Piggs Peak Hospital, where Designing Hope provides monthly nutritional support to HIV-positive patients and children, including food parcels and fortified porridge to support treatment adherence. Support to children is also provided through consultation spaces and prevention activities.

Most of Designing Hope's actions in Eswatini are developed in partnership with a local NGO: Fundsiza Live.

=== Actions in South Africa ===
Designing Hope also developed various initiatives in South Africa. The selected areas where the NGO works in South Africa are increasingly affected by poverty and healthcare. Indeed, the country suffered the biggest epidemic of HIV in the world, with 20% of South African living with HIV. Research has shown that spatial disparities and sociodemographic factors significantly influence one's risk of contacting HIV. Consequently, individuals facing precarious circumstances (such as widows, divorced, and unemployed people) experience higher odds of contracting HIV.

Beyond the immediate health crisis, the high mortality linked to HIV created another social emergency, leading to an increase in the number of orphans, reaching over 2 million children in 2015. Those kids live in precarious conditions, which causes more juvenile delinquency.

To help with those issues, Designing Hope created those programs:

- The Half Way House of Roosboom, created in 2010, is a day shelter for orphans, who are sometimes themselves HIV-positive, located next to Ladysmith, a city in the KwaZulu-Natal area. The goal is to create a welcoming space offering sports and cultural activities, as well as support with school and nutrition.
- Supply for the building of classrooms in the school of Buhlebezwe.
- Supply of school uniforms sewn by the women in Malanti (Eswatini) to children around the township.

=== Action in Lesotho ===
Designing Hope has also extended its mission to Lesotho. Similar to Eswatini and South Africa, Lesotho faces critical levels of poverty and healthcare access. The Kingdom of Lesotho currently has one of the highest HIV prevalence rates in the world, affecting approximately 21% of the adult population.

Designing Hope has focused its programs in Lesotho on youth:

- They collaborate with the St Paul School for the Deaf in St Monica (in the Leribe district, Lesotho). There, the NGO has established pedagogical gardens that serve as open-air classrooms. Thus, students can learn about biodiversity and nutrition. Furthermore, through the Uniformes & Différences program, orphans at the school receive uniforms sewn by the women's from Malanti (Eswatini).
- They lead the project "Farming our Future". It consists of hosting young deaf people to help them work towards autonomy, both at a social and professional level. It takes place at Levi's Nek Farm and gives young deaf and hard-of-hearing youth the opportunity to learn how to manage a farm.
  - Within Levi's Nek Farm, they also work on more programs, including:
    - The production of vegetables and the provision of nutritional support to Levi's Nek Hospital.
    - Condom packaging and distribution, in relation to HIV prevention.

=== Voluntourism ===
Some of these projects (like in Eswatini or in Lesotho) include on-site housing for volunteers who share their expertise in crafts, management, and nutrition through "voluntourism" initiatives.

Additionally, in Malanti (Eswatini), a roadside boutique will be established to sell artisanal goods and processed products from the garden to passing travelers.
