= LVMH Prize =

Fashion designer award

The LVMH Prize for Young Fashion Designers, commonly known as the LVMH Prize, is an award for fashion designers administered yearly by fashion conglomerate LVMH.

Founded by Delphine Arnault in 2014, the prize celebrates designers between the ages of 18 and 40 who have created at least two fashion collections. As of 2025, the ceremony awards four yearly awards: The LVMH Prize for Young Fashion Designers (the main LVMH Prize), The Karl Lagerfeld Prize, the Savoir-Faire Prize, and the LVMH Prize for Young Fashion Graduates.

== Jury ==
As of 2026, the jury is conformed by 16 members and a special guest, including the following 12 creative directors from LVMH houses:

- Jonathan Anderson of Dior
- Sarah Burton of Givenchy
- Maria Grazia Chiuri of Fendi
- Nicholas Ghesquière of Louis Vuitton Womenswear
- Stella McCartney of her eponymous label
- Jack McCollough and Lazaro Hernandez of Loewe
- Camille Miceli of Pucci
- Nigo of Kenzo
- Phoebe Philo of her eponymous label
- Michael Rider of Celine
- Pharrell Williams of Louis Vuitton Menswear

The following 4 LVMH directors:

- Delphine Arnault, daughter of Bernard Arnault and founder of the LVMH Prize
- Pietro Beccari, CEO of Louis Vuitton
- Jean-Paul Claverie, art advisor to Bernard Arnault
- Sidney Toledano, CEO of LVMH fashion group and former CEO of Dior

And Thai actress Urassaya Sperbund as a special guest.

== Winners ==
Year	LVMH Prize	Special Prize (later Karl Lagerfeld Prize)	Savoir-Faire Prize	Young Fashion Graduates Prize
2014
2014	Thomas Tait (Thomas Tait)	Miuniku (Nikita and Tina Sutradhar); Hood By Air (Shayne Oliver)	N/A	Peter Do, Teruhiro Hasegawa; Flavien Juan Nunez
2015
2015	Marques'Almeida (Marta Marques and Paulo Almeida)	Jacquemus (Simon Porte Jacquemus)	N/A	Matty Bovan; Gabriel Castro; Josh Dean
2016
2016	Wales Bonner (Grace Wales Bonner)	Vejas (Vejas Kruszewski)	N/A	Francesca Richiardi; Ayo Keys; Beth Hall
2017
2017	Marine Serre (Marine Serre)	Kozaburo (Kozaburo Akasaka)	N/A	Mariam Mazmishvili; Maija Meiro; Robert Wallace
2018
2018	Doublet (Masayuki Ino)	Rokh (Rok Hwang)	N/A	Archie M. Alled-Martinez; Maya Chantout; Scylia Chevaux
2019
2019	Thebe Magugu (Thebe Magugu)	Hed Mayner (Hed Mayner)	N/A	Daisy Yu; Juliette Tréhorel; Alice Paris
2020
2020	N/A*	N/A	N/A	N/A
2021
2021	Nensi Dojaka (Nensi Dojaka)	Kid Super (Colm Dillane); Lukhanyo Mdingi (Lukhanyo Mdingi); Rui (Rui Zhou)	N/A	Adam Kost; Franziska Simon; Eric Starc
2022
2022	S.S. Daley (Steven Stokey-Daley)	ERL (Eli Russell Linnetz); Winnie New York (Idris Balogun)	N/A	Filippo Bendanti; Miriam Griffiths; Valeria Pasco
2023
2023	Setchu (Satoshi Kuwata)	Better (Julie Pelipas); Magliano (Luca Magliano)	N/A	Luc Albert; Justine Janot; Nikki Park
2024
2024	Hodakova (Ellen Hodakova Larsson)	Duran Lantink (Duran Lantink)	Standing Ground (Michael Stewart)	Marine Gilles, Mickaël Nana; Lovro Lukić
2025
2025	Soshiotsuki (Soshi Otsuki)	Steve O Smith (Steve O Smith)	Torishéju (Torishéju Dumi)	Louna Clozel (La Cambre Brussels); Sophia Sacchetti (Parsons Paris); Peiwen Mao (Royal Academy of Fine Arts Antwerp)
2026	Julie Kegels (Julie Kegels)	LII (Zane Li)	Yoshita 1967 (Anil Padia)	María Alborés (Royal Academy of Fine Arts Antwerp); Candice Morin (IFM); Louis Presencer (Central Saint Martins)

*Due to the COVID-19 pandemic, the 2020 LVMH Prize was not awarded, with the cash prize was distributed amongst the 2020 finalists: Ahluwalia (Priya Ahluwalia), Casablanca (Charaf Tajer), Chopova Lowena (Emma Chopova and Laura Lowena), Tomo Koizumi (Tomotaka Koizumi), Nicholas Daley, Peter Do, Sindiso Khumalo, and Supriya Lele.
