= Priya Ahluwalia =

British-Indian-Nigerian fashion designer

- Born: 1992/1993
- Education: University for the Creative Arts (BA); University of Westminster (MA)
- Occupation: Fashion designer
- Known for: Founder of the fashion label Ahluwalia
- Awards: Queen Elizabeth II Award for British Design (2021)

Priya Ahluwalia (born 1992/1993) is a British fashion designer and founder of the apparel brand Ahluwalia. She gained notability for her approach to sustainable fashion. Ahluwalia’s work focuses on upcycling, ethical practices, and exploring identity through multiculturalism.

== Early life and education ==
Ahluwalia was born to a second generation British-Indian mother from Newcastle and a Nigerian father and grew up in Tooting. Her multicultural upbringing influenced her design philosophy.

Ahluwalia attended a girls school and had a Saturday job in Kingston. She graduated with a Bachelor of Arts (BA) in Fashion from the University for the Creative Arts in 2015. She completed a Master of Arts (MA) in Menswear at University of Westminster in 2018.

== Career ==
Ahluwalia launched the clothing brand, Ahluwalia, in 2018. The brand focuses on creating clothing using deadstock fabrics and vintage textiles. Her designs draw inspiration from her trips to Lagos, Nigeria, and Panipat, India, as well as her experiences growing up in London.

The graduate collection that preceded the launch of her label received an order from the retailer Opening Ceremony (retailer)|Opening Ceremony and was covered by Dazed, i-D and CNN. Six months after completing her master's degree, Ahluwalia presented work with Adidas at Paris Fashion Week.

Ahluwalia has collaborated with brands such as Adidas Originals, Mulberry, Microsoft, and PUMA. These include a "capsule collection" with Mulberry using repurposed leather and the Circulate platform with Microsoft, which integrates technology into upcycling.

Ahluwalia's work has received recognition in the fashion industry for its focus on sustainability and storytelling. She was awarded the H&M Design Award (2019), was a finalist for the LVMH Prize (2020), and received the Queen Elizabeth II Award for British Design (2021).

In 2021, she won the BFC/GQ Designer Menswear Fund, which carried a £150,000 cash prize along with a year of business mentoring and pro-bono legal services. She was also named a finalist for the 2022 International Woolmark Prize.

Ahluwalia’s designs have been featured in exhibitions and installations globally, where her use of textiles often emphasizes the environmental and social impacts of the fashion industry. In January 2024, she appeared on a cover of British Vogue alongside the designers Tolu Coker and Torishéju Dumi for an issue spotlighting sustainability in fashion.

=== Books ===
Ahluwalia has published two photography books. Her first, Sweet Lassi, was made to accompany her MA graduate collection and documented a 2017 trip to Lagos, Nigeria, and Panipat, India, where she photographed the secondhand-clothing and textile-recycling trade. Her second book, Jalebi (2020), made with the photographer Laurence Ellis and released during London's first digital fashion week, is a portrait of the Punjabi community of Southall in west London.

=== Films ===
In November 2020, Ahluwalia released her first short film, Joy, as part of GucciFest, a digital showcase organized by Gucci. Directed by Samona Olanipekun, the documentary-style film featured community figures and celebrated Afro-Caribbean culture and the Black British experience.
