= Colm Dillane =

American fashion designer (born 1991)

- Born: 1991 (age 34–35); New York City, U.S.
- Education: New York University (BS)
- Label: KidSuper
- Awards: Karl Lagerfeld Prize, LVMH Prize (2021)
- Website: kidsuper.com

Colm Dillane (born 1991), also known as KidSuper, is an American artist, fashion designer, and musician. He is the founder of KidSuper, a streetwear clothing brand based in Brooklyn, New York. In 2021, he won the Karl Lagerfeld Prize at the LVMH Prize. In January 2023, Dillane creative directed Louis Vuitton's men's fashion show.

== Early life and education ==
Dillane was born in New York City in 1991 to a Spanish mother, an artist turned teacher, and an Irish father, a fisherman. He spent parts of his childhood in Mexico and Beloit, Wisconsin, before returning to New York at age 13. He attended Brooklyn Technical High School, where he and his friends screen-printed T-shirts and sold them in the school cafeteria, and graduated in 2009. After a year in Brazil playing football, he enrolled at New York University, where he earned a Bachelor of Science in mathematics and played midfielder for the men's soccer team.

== Career ==
KidSuper grew out of the T-shirt business Dillane ran in high school; at New York University he sold clothes from his dorm room, and after he was evicted from the dorm in his sophomore year for spray-painting its walls and turning it into a store, he bought a retail space on Broadway in Brooklyn that became the KidSuper studio. After graduating, he ran the label full-time, and its painted graphics and patchwork earned it a local cult following that included the rapper Mac Miller. Beyond fashion, Dillane has also ventured into various art projects, exhibiting his work in several galleries and collaborating with other artists. Dillane has worked with various artists, both as a producer and sometimes as a performer, and with brands, musicians, athletes, and other public figures.

Dillane first showed in Paris in June 2019 with "A Bull in a China Shop", an off-calendar show at the Cirque d'Hiver held after the Fédération de la Haute Couture et de la Mode declined his application; he printed an enlarged version of the rejection letter on one of the collection's looks. KidSuper was admitted to the federation's official calendar in late 2019 and presented digitally during the pandemic, returning to the Paris runway in June 2022 with a Spring/Summer 2023 show staged as a live auction of Dillane's paintings, conducted by Christie's auctioneer Lydia Fenet. The sale raised $529,000, part of which was donated to foundations supporting young artists, and Kenan Thompson walked as a model.

In January 2023, Dillane organized a menswear fashion and comedy show at the Casino de Paris. The show featured comedians such as Jeff Ross, Yvonne Orji, and Stavros Halkias, and was hosted by Tyra Banks.

=== Collaboration with Louis Vuitton (LVMH) ===
In January 2023, Dillane co-created Louis Vuitton's Fall/Winter 2023 men's collection as the house's first guest runway designer, working embedded within the LV men's design studio after the 2021 death of men's artistic director Virgil Abloh. The show, presented on January 19, featured a prelude film directed by Michel Gondry and his brother Olivier and a performance by Rosalía.

=== Later shows and collaborations ===
In June 2024, KidSuper staged its Spring/Summer 2025 show, "It's All Up in the Air", a collaboration with Cirque du Soleil held at the Trianon theater in Paris, where acrobats performed alongside the models. KidSuper shows have also featured cameos from footballers Ronaldinho and Mario Balotelli.

KidSuper's collaboration with Puma began in 2020 and has included sneakers, apparel, and custom kits for Manchester City, Borussia Dortmund, and Palmeiras at the FIFA Club World Cup. In June 2026, during the 2026 FIFA World Cup, the label presented its Spring/Summer 2027 show at Nu Stadium in Miami, home of Inter Miami CF, instead of its usual Paris slot; the 48 looks represented the 48 countries competing in the tournament, and a BAPE collaboration of 48 Bapesta colorways accompanied the collection. For the World Cup, KidSuper also designed Puma boots for Christian Pulisic and Neymar.

=== Baller League USA ===
In 2026, Dillane and Colombian singer J Balvin co-managed Super Niños FC, a team in the first US season of Baller League, a six-a-side soccer competition that began play in Miami in March 2026. KidSuper designed the league's team kits with Nike, and the Super Niños played in Jordan Brand kits. The team ended the season as Baller League USA champions.

== Recognition ==
In 2021, Dillane won the Karl Lagerfeld Prize at the LVMH Prize, which he shared with Lukhanyo Mdingi and Rui Zhou; each winner received €150,000. He was nominated for American Emerging Designer of the Year at the 2022 CFDA Awards, was a finalist for the 2022 CFDA/Vogue Fashion Fund, and made the Vogue Business 100 Innovators list that year. In 2023, he was nominated for American Menswear Designer of the Year at the CFDA Awards, and joined the BoF 500, Business of Fashion's index of industry figures. In 2026, KidSuper won the Red Bull Flugtag in Miami, Florida.
