= Sindiso Khumalo =

South African textile and fashion designer

- Education: University of Cape Town; Central Saint Martins
- Label: Sindiso Khumalo
- Awards: Green Carpet Fashion Awards, Best Independent Designer (2020)
- Website: sindisokhumalo.com

Sindiso Khumalo is a South African textile and fashion designer based in Cape Town. Trained as an architect, she founded her eponymous womenswear label in 2015 and works with hand-drawn prints, organic and recycled materials, and artisan workshops in South Africa and Burkina Faso. Each of her collections takes a Black woman from history as its subject, among them the South African activist Charlotte Maxeke, the Yoruba princess Sarah Forbes Bonetta, and the American abolitionist Harriet Tubman. Khumalo was one of eight finalists for the 2020 LVMH Prize and received the Best Independent Designer award at that year's Green Carpet Fashion Awards.

== Early life and education ==
Khumalo was raised in Durban and is from KwaZulu-Natal. She draws on her Zulu and Ndebele heritage in her work, and has said that her mother, an activist, shaped the emphasis on social equality in her designs.

She studied architecture at the University of Cape Town before moving to London, where she worked for the architect David Adjaye. She then completed a master's degree in design for textile futures at Central Saint Martins. Her early textile work drew directly on that training: she has described a long-standing interest in mid-century concrete architecture, and coined the term "Afro-Bauhaus-Gone-Pop" for the aesthetic of her first collections.

== Career ==
=== Label and design practice ===
Khumalo founded her ready-to-wear womenswear label in Cape Town in 2015. She later paused the business to raise her children and relaunched it in 2018.

She designs her textiles by hand using watercolor and collage. The label uses organic cotton, hemp and recycled fabrics and does not mass-produce. Its supply chain includes handwoven Dafani cotton from workshops in Burkina Faso, together with hand embroidery and crocheted detailing made by women employed through Embrace Dignity, a Cape Town organization that supports women leaving sex work. Khumalo has argued that sustainability cannot be reduced to materials alone and should be understood alongside poverty alleviation, describing environmental damage and poverty as linked.

Her spring/summer 2021 collection, "Minty", was named after Harriet Tubman's childhood nickname and presented as a fashion film for her first solo show at Milan Fashion Week, held digitally because of the COVID-19 pandemic; the textile illustrations were made by the Cape Town artist Shakil Solanki. The preceding collection had centered on Sarah Forbes Bonetta, and the following one on Charlotte Maxeke.

Khumalo's "Miss Celie" dress, named after the protagonist of Alice Walker's novel The Color Purple, carries a toile de Jouy–style print called "Zulu Princess", illustrated by Alex Fox, which depicts Nguni homestead life and includes an image of Khumalo's mother wearing an inkehli, a Zulu headdress, at Khumalo's wedding.

=== Collaborations ===
In 2019 Khumalo was one of the African designers behind IKEA's Överallt collection, unveiled at the Design Indaba festival in Cape Town. With the architect Renee Rossouw she designed textiles for the range, basing her patterns on the architecture of Johannesburg.

For International Women's Day in 2022, Vans invited the retailer Sarah Andelman to select four women designers to rework classic styles for its limited-edition Vault line; Khumalo was among them, and her shoe used the "Zulu Princess" print.

In April 2023 she released a limited-edition collection of dresses, swimwear and accessories for & Other Stories, part of H&M Group, made from organic cotton, recycled cotton and linen.

=== Retail ===
For its first decade the label operated on a wholesale basis, selling through Net-a-Porter and boutiques in Asia and Europe.(subscription required) In July 2025 Khumalo opened her first store, in the Longkloof precinct in Cape Town, furnished in part with surplus tiles and repurposed furniture by South African makers.

== Recognition ==
Khumalo was one of eight finalists for the 2020 LVMH Prize for Young Fashion Designers. After the competition was disrupted by the COVID-19 pandemic, LVMH converted the award into a solidarity fund and divided the €300,000 prize equally, so that each finalist received €40,000. Later that year she was named Best Independent Designer at the Green Carpet Fashion Awards, which recognize sustainability in fashion.

Her work was included in Africa Fashion, an exhibition at the Victoria and Albert Museum in London that ran from July 2022 to April 2023 and later toured internationally. The museum holds several of her garments in its permanent collection, including the "Miss Celie" dress and bonnet. She has also shown work at the Smithsonian National Museum of African Art in Washington, the Louisiana Museum of Modern Art in Denmark and Zeitz MOCAA in Cape Town, and has spoken on sustainability in fashion at the United Nations.
