= Thomas Tait (fashion designer) =

Canadian-born British fashion designer

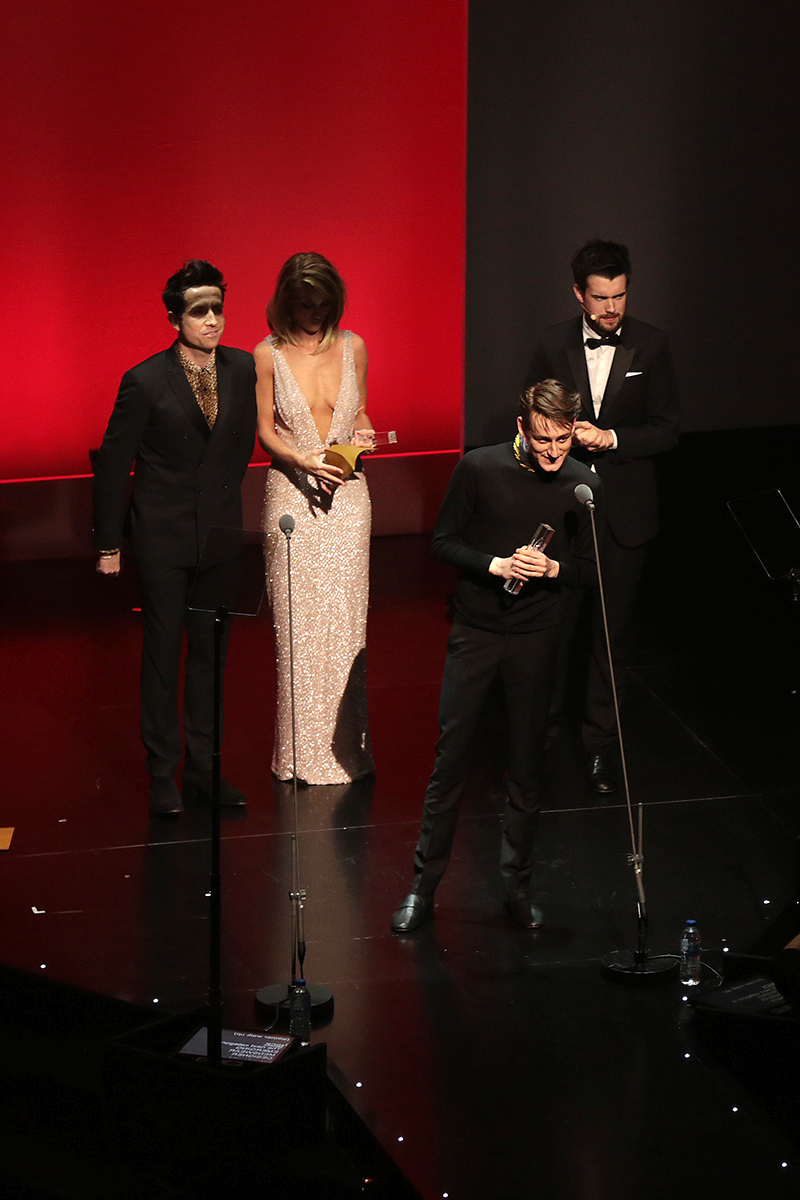
- Thomas Tait at a fair
- Born: Thomas Tait; Montréal, Quebec, Canada
- Education: Central Saint Martins (MA, 2010)
- Years active: 2010–present

Thomas Tait is a Canadian‑born British fashion designer based in London. His work spans womenswear collections, creative direction, and multidisciplinary collaborations.

== Early life and education ==
Born in Montréal, Quebec, Thomas Tait completed a technical diploma at Collège LaSalle in 2008 before enrolling in the MA Womenswear program at Central Saint Martins, London. He graduated in 2010.

== Career ==
Tait launched his eponymous womenswear label in 2010

In June 2015, Tait was appointed official Guest Womenswear Designer at Pitti Uomo 88 in Florence, Italy, presenting seven reworked pieces from earlier collections in a reflective installation.

Tait has collaborated with brands including Nike, Louis Vuitton, and Max Mara, and received titles such as Designer of the Year from the London Design Museum and Emerging Womenswear Designer at the British Fashion Awards in 2015.

== Awards ==
- 2010 – Dorchester Collection Fashion Prize
- 2010–13 – British Fashion Council NEWGEN sponsorship
- 2014 – LVMH Prize (winner)
- 2015 – British Fashion Council Emerging Womenswear Designer
- 2015 – Designer of the Year, London Design Museum
