= Kozaburo Akasaka =

Japanese fashion designer (born 1984)

- Born: 1984 (age 41–42); Tokyo, Japan
- Education: Central Saint Martins (BFA); Parsons School of Design (MFA)
- Years active: 2011–present
- Label: Kozaburo
- Awards: LVMH Prize Special Prize (2017)
- Website: kozaburo.com

Kozaburo Akasaka (born 1984) is a Japanese fashion designer and the founder of the New York-based menswear label Kozaburo. He won the LVMH Special Prize in 2017, and was a finalist for the CFDA/Vogue Fashion Fund in 2023.

== Early life and education ==
Akasaka was born and raised in Tokyo, Japan. He initially studied philosophy at Toyo University, leaving in his final year to pursue fashion. He earned a first-class BFA in Menswear from Central Saint Martins in 2011, and completed an MFA in Fashion Design at Parsons School of Design in 2016.

== Career ==
After graduating, Akasaka moved to New York and designed menswear at Thom Browne from 2011 to 2013. While studying at Parsons, he was selected for the VFiles Runway Spring 2016 show during New York Fashion Week, and his final thesis collection was stocked at Dover Street Market.

=== Founding the label ===
Akasaka founded Kozaburo in 2016, after completing his MFA. The label's first stand-alone menswear presentation took place in New York in January 2017, and its debut collection, for Fall 2017, included jeans woven from strips of vintage denim. Akasaka has connected this use of upcycled materials to mottainai, a Japanese saying meaning "waste nothing". In June 2017 he won the LVMH Special Prize for his thesis collection, "Brutal Sensitivity", receiving a €150,000 grant and a year of mentorship from LVMH.

=== Collaborations ===
Kozaburo has collaborated with Wrangler, Vibram, and Suicoke. In 2022 the label released a Fall/Winter collaboration with the Japanese outdoor brand Snow Peak.

=== New York Fashion Week ===
Kozaburo began presenting its collections during New York Fashion Week in 2018. The label made its runway debut in September 2023 with its Spring 2024 collection, "The Land of the Setting Sun", which featured sakiori-woven denim and accessories made with cycora, a material regenerated from end-of-life textiles. Layla Ilchi of WWD called the collection "a refined take on classic streetwear". In 2023, Akasaka was also a finalist for the CFDA/Vogue Fashion Fund.

== Design approach ==
Akasaka has said his work connects Eastern and Western sensibilities through memory and pop culture; he has named Michael Jackson's study of earlier music and dance as a model. The label pairs classic menswear tailoring with references to the music subcultures and street styles of 1990s Japan. The label's sakiori denim, woven from strips of used clothing, is its best-known material.

== Personal life ==
Akasaka is based in New York.
