= Helmut Lang (fashion brand) =

Fashion label

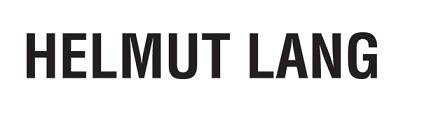
- Industry: Fashion
- Founded: Paris, France (1986)
- Founder: Helmut Lang
- Key people: Dinesh Tandon (CEO); Peter Do (creative director)
- Owner: Fast Retailing
- Website: helmutlang.com

Helmut Lang is a New York–based luxury fashion brand created by Austrian fashion designer Helmut Lang in 1986 known for its distinctive minimalist style. The brand was acquired from its founder by fashion house Prada in 2004, and then by Fast Retailing in 2006.

== Brand history ==
Helmut Lang, a fashion autodidact, set up a made-to-measure fashion studio in Vienna in 1977 and opened a boutique there in 1979 at the age of 23. His clothes were fairly successful in his native Austria, and, after presenting his work as part of an exhibition titled "l'Apocalypse Joyeuse" at the Centre Pompidou in Paris, initiated by the Austrian government, he branched out successfully to Paris in 1986 and created the label "Helmut Lang".

At this time in the late 1980s and early 1990s, minimalist fashion was at its height. His clothes were made with very sharp lines and careful cuts, creating minimal silhouettes, often using high-tech fabrics. His work has been compared to Rei Kawakubo and Yohji Yamamoto for his sometimes austere, intellectual designs.

Lang is known for his minimalist, deconstructivist, and often severe designs. His fashion house became famous in the late 1980s for its simple but refined designs, its slim suits in black or white, its denim collection, and the use of high-tech fabrics. Helmut Lang fashions were sold in upscale department stores and through select retailers, as well as in signature Helmut Lang stores around the world. In 1999, Lang entered into a partnership with Prada Group which resulted in the acquisition of the Helmut Lang brand by Prada in 2004, and Mr. Lang's departure from the label in 2005. Prada consequently sold it to Link Theory of Japan in 2006. Link Theory re-launched the Helmut Lang label with new designers in 2007. Since then, Helmut Lang fashions have been available again at upscale department stores and signature Helmut Lang boutiques worldwide.

=== New York City ===
Lang moved to New York in 1997 and subsequently set up his company's headquarters in 80 Greene St. in SoHo in 1998. That April, three days before his designs were to be presented to a New York audience, his collection was shown to an international audience through a live internet broadcast, via the newly created company's web site. As a first in the fashion industry, ads for the brand could be seen on New York taxi tops from 1998 to 2004. The following season he announced to show his collections not only before New York Fashion Week, but also before the Milan and Paris runway shows. As a result, with many American designers following suit, New York Fashion Week was permanently moved up six weeks to herald the established runway shows. From 2000 on, unconventional print ads for the brand were placed with National Geographic magazine.

=== Style ===
Helmut Lang has consistently sold both men's and women's lines of clothing, kept under a single name and always presented in one fashion show. Underwear (1995) and jeans (1996) lines as well as accessories such as footwear (1990) and fragrances (1999) were launched, but otherwise the brand was kept unified to solidify its identity and strength.

The runway show venues for the Helmut Lang label were switched from Paris (until 1998) to New York by Mr. Lang and back again to Paris by Prada (from 2002 to 2005). The collections/presentations used to be called séances de travail ("working sessions") by Mr. Lang.

== Prada partnership ==
In 1999, Milan-based fashion house Prada acquired 51% of the Helmut Lang company in the course of a multi-brand strategy, which also included the acquisition of German fashion label Jil Sander.

After alleged disputes with Prada Group's CEO Patrizio Bertelli on how the brand should be continued, and after Mr. Lang had sold his remaining shares to Prada in October 2004, he left his own label in January 2005. Lang joined the growing number of designer departures, including Jil Sander from her own label at Prada and Tom Ford from Gucci. Lang has publicly maintained that he had no issue with Mr. Bertelli.

== Acquisition by Link Theory ==
Prada Group was not successful with the brand and, on March 17, 2006, announced that, after losses over six years, Link Theory Holdings (LTH) of Tokyo would be acquiring the Helmut Lang brand for an estimated €20 million. This came about three weeks after Prada had sold the Jil Sander label to British equity firm Change Capital Partners (CCP). Already in spring 2005, it had been rumored that Prada was trying to sell the label. Prada Group was said to want to concentrate on its core labels, Prada and Miu Miu, again. The Japanese holding company LTH, developer of the theory fashion label in Japan and the US, re-launched the Helmut Lang collections under the direction of a "suitable" designer for the spring/summer 2007 season (presented in fall 2006), in select boutiques worldwide as a "contemporary brand". The new label is based out of New York City.

It was never expected that Lang himself would return to the label that bears his name, although Chikara Sasake, president and chief executive of LTH, gave to understand that if Lang "wants to come back, the door is always open".

== Helmut Lang brand re-launch ==
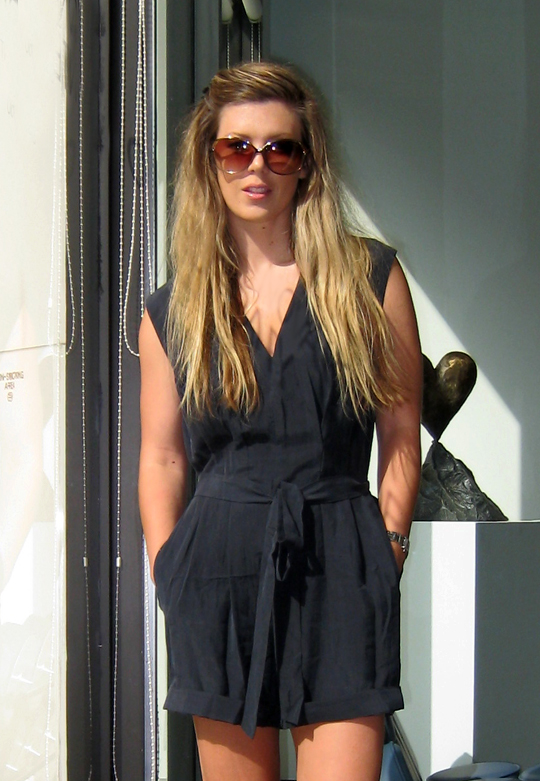
A woman wearing a Helmut Lang romper suit

In May 2006, it was announced that Michael and Nicole Colovos, an American-New Zealand designer couple, who formerly had their own Los Angeles–based denim label Habitual, had been installed by Link Theory as creative directors for the new Helmut Lang brand. From February 2007, select upscale retailers such as Barneys or Bergdorf Goodman started to carry the spring/summer 2007 Helmut Lang contemporary sportswear collection. The design office has been set up in West Chelsea in New York. The collection, described as "a commercial reduction of [Mr. Lang's] fashion identity", has received quite favorable reviews even though it is clearly not seen as a continuation of the original line. The item prices in the collection are about 20% above those for comparable theory items and, hence, below the original Helmut Lang prices. Link Theory expects to generate US$ 8 million in revenues in 2008, and make a profit in 2009 with the label. The company also announced that "over the long term" they intend "to also establish exclusive Helmut Lang shops" in the US, Europe and Japan.

The Helmut Lang web site was re-activated at the end of 2006 and was fully launched in spring 2007. Mr. Lang, who now resides on Long Island of independent means, is said not to be involved in the label's re-launch in any way.

In February 2014, Michael and Nicole Colovos, after eight years of being creative directors, left the company. The Colovos designed the 2014 Fall collection called Rough Terrain.

In March 2017, it was announced that in lieu of a creative designer, Helmut Lang would re-launch with Isabella Burley, editor of the British youth culture magazine Dazed & Confused, as “editor in residence.”

In January 2018, it was announced that Alix Browne would be appointed as "editor-in-residence," replacing Isabella Burley.

In August 2018, the brand engaged in a series of layoffs after several years of profitability, with the aim to restructure the organization.

In May 2023, the brand announced that New York designer Peter Do would become the creative director of Helmut Lang.

== Helmut Lang stores ==
=== Original stores (until 2005) ===
All of the original, art-inspired signature Helmut Lang stores that existed in Vienna, Munich, Moscow, Saint Petersburg, Milan, Paris, New York, Hong Kong, Singapore, and Tokyo, as well as several stores-in-store in the Asian market, that existed between 1995 and 2005 have been closed. The last one to close was the Paris location in 2005.

=== New stores (after 2007) ===
In March 2007, Link Theory opened the first post-Prada signature Helmut Lang store in Tokyo's fashionable Aoyama district. In Japan, the company has since then installed several Helmut Lang stores-in-store at local department stores. In August 2007, a new freestanding Helmut Lang store was opened on Melrose Avenue in Los Angeles. It is, after the Tokyo store, the second signature Helmut Lang store since the closing of the last original store in Paris. The store is adjacent to an existing theory store at 8424 Melrose Avenue. Another Helmut Lang store opened on September 28, 2007, on Maiden Lane in San Francisco, in the building previously occupied by Jil Sander. However, in April 2008, this store was converted into a Theory store. In New York City, a temporary 'pop-up shop' opened in mid-December 2007, while the company was looking for a larger location in the Meatpacking District. May 8, 2008, saw the opening of a Helmut Lang outlet store at Woodbury Common Premium Outlets in New York, however, this store has since closed.

In May 2019, the Melrose Avenue store in Los Angeles closed.

As of May 2023, there are two operating brick and mortar Helmut Lang stores, one in Ginza, Tokyo, and the Meatpacking District in New York City, New York.

== Original fragrances ==
Three different perfumes were associated with the Helmut Lang label, produced in cooperation with Procter & Gamble, all of which were discontinued with the closing of the original brand in 2005.

- Helmut Lang Eau de Parfum – 2000
- Helmut Lang Eau de Cologne – 2000
- Helmut Lang Cuiron (men's) – 2002
- Helmut Lang Velviona – 2001
