= Marques'Almeida =

British fashion label

Marques'Almeida is a fashion label which debuted in London in 2011.

The label was founded by Portuguese designers Marta Marques and Paulo Almeida, who both studied at Central Saint Martins in London. The brand is known for the creative use of denim, Style.com credited the label with helping launch the revival of distressed denim in the 2010s. However, the brand's focus is actually on high-end women's wear, and despite being renowned for their innovative denim garments, they didn't include jeans in their collection until 2015.

In 2015, the label won the LVMH Young Fashion Designer Prize, the largest cash prize for a new brand in fashion.

The brand is sold through their own E-commerce site, as well as many fashion e-commerce giants such as SSENSE, Net-a-Porter, and Matches Fashion.
