= Miuniku =

Indian womenswear business

MIUNIKU is a Mumbai-based luxury womenswear clothing and accessories label designed by sisters Nikita and Tina Sutradhar. Miuniku's design is inspired by a unique blend of modernity and tradition and India-inspired colors and mixed with western cuts.

== History ==
The sisters attended London College of Fashion and completed a BA (Hons) in Womenswear graduating in June 2013.

In 2014, Miuniku were recipients of the Special Prize at the inaugural LVMH Prize, receiving 100,000 Euros and one year mentorship with LVMH.
