= Nensi Dojaka =

Albanian-born fashion designer in the U.K. (born 1993)

- Born: 1993 (age 32–33); Tirana, Albania
- Education: London College of Fashion; Central Saint Martins
- Label: Nensi Dojaka
- Awards: Winner, LVMH Prize (2021); Winner, BFC Foundation Award (2021)
- Website: nensidojaka.com

Nensi Dojaka (born July 1993) is an Albanian fashion designer based in London. After studying lingerie design at the London College of Fashion and completing an MA at Central Saint Martins, she founded her eponymous womenswear label in 2019. Her designs, which apply lingerie construction to sheer, cut-out dresses and separates, were picked up early by retailers including SSENSE, and in 2020 Bella Hadid wore the label to the 2020 MTV Video Music Awards.

In 2021, Dojaka won the LVMH Prize for young designers and the BFC Foundation Award at The Fashion Awards. After two seasons away from London Fashion Week, she returned in September 2024 with a see-now-buy-now collaboration with Calvin Klein.

== Early life and education ==
Dojaka was born in Tirana, Albania, in the summer of 1993. Her parents sent her to drawing classes from the age of five, where she would sketch girls in dresses. At 16, she moved to England to attend Concord College, a boarding school in Shropshire, near Shrewsbury, where she studied fine art, double maths, and English literature. After a foundation year at Central Saint Martins, where a tutor suggested she study lingerie design, she took a BA in fashion contour at the London College of Fashion and then an MA in womenswear at Central Saint Martins, graduating in 2019.

== Career ==
Dojaka started her own label in July 2019, after visa complications made taking a job in the United Kingdom impractical. Her graduate collection had been bought by the Canadian retailer SSENSE, which became an early stockist. Her runway debut came in February 2020 with Fashion East, the talent incubator run by Lulu Kennedy; the show featured deconstructed minidresses, mesh separates, and strappy bras. Her next two collections were presented digitally because of the COVID-19 pandemic. In August 2020, Bella Hadid wore a sheer off-the-shoulder top and low-slung trousers from the label to the 2020 MTV Video Music Awards, in a look put together by stylist Carlos Nazario. She was the first celebrity to wear Dojaka's designs on a red carpet.

Dojaka staged her first solo runway show at London Fashion Week on 17 September 2021, ten days after winning the 2021 LVMH Prize, an award that came with a €300,000 grant and a year of mentorship. Reviewing the show, Vogue critic Sarah Mower praised its "classily engineered nuances of reveal and conceal", while FashionNetwork found the range still limited and the venue, the disused Old Selfridges Hotel, ill-suited to intimate clothing. The show brought the label orders from 59 stockists, up from 23 for the spring 2021 season. In November, she won the BFC Foundation Award for emerging designer talent at The Fashion Awards, held at the Royal Albert Hall.

Her spring 2023 collection, shown at London Fashion Week in September 2022, introduced denim to the label and closed with Emily Ratajkowski on the runway; sales of the collection rose 127 per cent on the previous season, while her stockist count grew from 59 to 90. In February 2023, she released her first bridal collection, a 24-piece capsule sold exclusively through Mytheresa. The range included a version of the sequinned corset that Adut Akech had worn, with a chiffon skirt, to the 2022 Fashion Awards.

After an absence of two seasons from London Fashion Week, Dojaka returned in September 2024 with a Spring/Summer 2025 show that introduced a collaboration with Calvin Klein. Developed over about 18 months, the see-now-buy-now capsule of 44 lingerie, knitwear, and tailoring pieces applied her lingerie-based construction to Calvin Klein underwear, and was sold through her own ecommerce site at Calvin Klein's mid-level price point. It was the first outside-brand proposal she had accepted, despite several earlier approaches. In April 2026, the French lingerie brand Etam released a nine-piece swimwear capsule designed by Dojaka, made up of 1990s-inspired black bandeau tops, swimsuits, and a cut-out dress.

== Style ==
Dojaka's womenswear applies the construction techniques of lingerie to ready-to-wear, building visible seams, sheer and matte contrasts, and fine straps into a graphic play on the body. Her collections layer sheer tulle and georgette into figure-hugging dresses and separates detailed with cut-outs and deconstructed layers, sometimes set against more masculine tailoring. Vogue critic Sarah Mower has described the work as a sophisticated way of exposing and covering the body, crediting Dojaka's lingerie-technology training for the precise calibration of fit. Dojaka drapes her pieces directly on the mannequin, a technique she has used since the start of the label. Of the revealing results, she has said: "It's sexy because of the cut-outs, but I control the sexiness by where I place them."
