= Mike Amiri =

American fashion designer (born 1976)

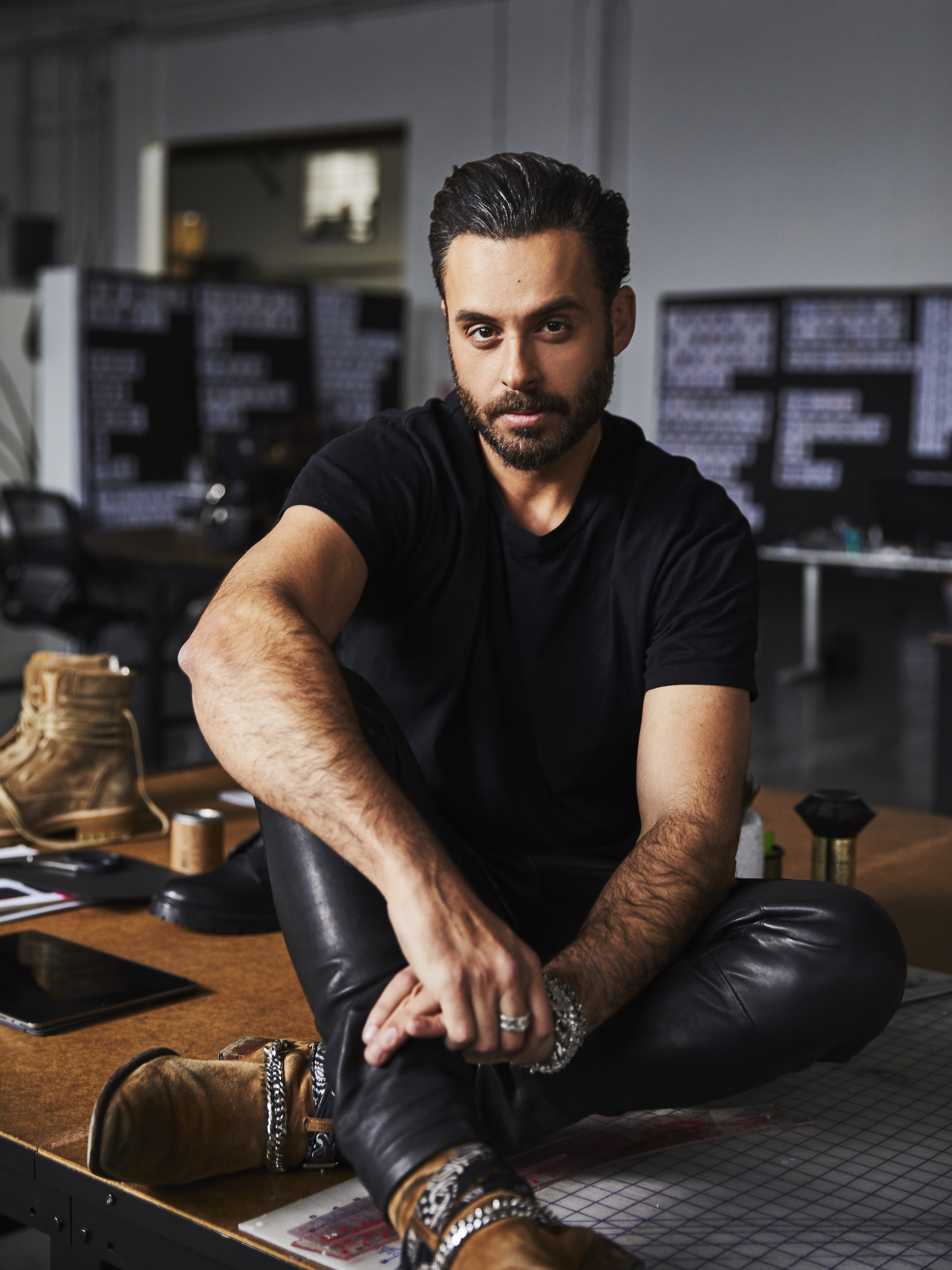
- Amiri in 2019
- Born: September 6, 1976 (age 50); Hollywood, California, U.S.
- Education: Santa Monica College, University of California, Los Angeles (BA); Loyola Law School (JD)
- Occupations: Fashion designer, creative director
- Known for: Founder of Amiri
- Spouse: Shirin Amiri
- Children: 3
- Website: amiri.com

Mike Amiri (born September 6, 1976) is an American fashion designer and the founder and creative director of the fashion house Amiri (stylized AMIRI), based in California.

== Early and personal life ==
Mike Amiri was born and raised in Hollywood, California, to Iranian Jewish parents. He graduated from Beverly Hills High School.

Amiri attended Santa Monica College, followed by study of history at University of California, Los Angeles (UCLA), and he later earned a Juris Doctor degree from Loyola Law School.

Amiri is married to Shirin Amiri, and they have three children.

== Career ==
After working in the music industry, Amiri transitioned to designing handcrafted stage outfits for musicians. According to interviews, Amiri's work with musicians included detailed customization, which later appeared in his brand's designs. In 2014, Amiri released a debut capsule collection of menswear for the Los Angeles concept store Maxfield. This collection led to the launch of his brand later that year.

=== Amiri ===
Amiri launched his fashion brand, Amiri, in 2014. Amiri credits Barneys New York with supporting the brand in its early stages. The brand is available in over 160 retailers worldwide, including Bergdorf Goodman in New York, Neiman Marcus in Beverly Hills, Galeries Lafayette in Paris, Selfridges and Harrods in London, Harvey Nichols in Dubai, and Lane Crawford in Hong Kong and mainland China. As of 2023, Amiri has standalone flagship stores in Beverly Hills, New York, Las Vegas, Miami, Chicago, Houston, Atlanta, New Delhi, Shanghai, Tokyo, Nanjing, and Dubai.

In 2018, Amiri showed for the first time at Paris Fashion Week. The brand has presented bi-annual collections in Paris each year. Vogue Runway has noted that the brand's presence at Paris Fashion Week indicates its presence in the global luxury market. In February 2022, Amiri presented a runway show in Los Angeles in collaboration with the contemporary American artist, Wes Lang.

Since 2018, Mike Amiri has been a member of the Council of Fashion Designers of America (CFDA). He was nominated for the Swarovski Award for Emerging Talent at the CFDA Fashion Awards. Amiri also won the Emerging Talent Award at the 2018 Footwear News Achievement Awards. In 2019, 2021, 2022 and 2023, Amiri was nominated for the Menswear Designer of the Year at the CFDA Fashion Awards.

In 2023, Amiri appointed Adrian Ward-Rees, the former senior vice president at Burberry and managing director of Dior Menswear, as chief executive officer, replacing Amiri.
