= Wes Lang =

American artist (born 1972)

Wes Lang (born 1972) is an American visual artist living and working in Los Angeles, California. His artworks explore themes of mortality and the human condition through a personal repertoire of motifs drawn from pop culture, Americana, and imagery of skulls and skeletons.

== Life ==
Lang was born in 1972 in Chatham, New Jersey. His parents exposed him to art and music from an early age. His mother was an interior designer; she would often take him to fabric showrooms and museums. His father ran a record shop for some time.

After high school he moved to New York where he worked in a record shop, tattoo parlor and as an art handler. Lang initially financed his study of art history and his work by stealing and reselling art history books, and by stealing paint for his projects. While working as an art handler his boss provided Lang with a studio space in Lower Manhattan for two months, where Lang produced his first exhibition in New York.In 2002, Lang left his art handling job to become a full-time artist.

Since 2012, Lang has lived and worked in Los Angeles, California, where he resides with his wife, Kat.

== Art ==
Lang is self-taught, having come to art in his late twenties. Lang's work consists primarily of paintings and drawings, but he also works in other media, including sculpture, collage, fabric, glass, and precious metals. Working with themes of mortality and memento mori, he encourages viewers to counter what he describes as “the prevailing narrative of negativity.”

His painting series Endless Horizons and Pink and Blue, depict skulls and skeletons as feathered horsemen in Native American-inspired attire. Pink and Blue emerged from a period of personal and existential reflection during the COVID-19 pandemic and in the period following his wedding. Influenced by Pablo Picasso’s Blue and Rose periods, these series explore themes of life, love, and impermanence.

His The Black Paintings series produced between 2022 and 2024, feature skeleton figures, alongside animal-like and otherworldly beings. Some works depict long-haired skeletons dressed in dinner jackets, shown in restaurants and bars where they sip fine wine, play musical instruments, and engage in conversation against dark backgrounds, landscapes or patterned wallpapers. Other works from this series are still lifes with skulls and animals. Lang describes this series as a “narrative journey that these characters were going on.” The 1920 movie The Moon Riders, served as an inspiration for the works. The Black Paintings were the subject of Lang's first exhibition in the UK, held in 2024 at the Newport Street Gallery, London.

Lang's drawings feature similar characters and themes as his paintings, rendered in acrylic, crayon, and pencil, with large areas of the paper left blank and often incorporating text.

In 2011 Lang produced a series of drawings during a month-long stay at the Chateau Marmont hotel in Los Angeles. Many of these works were created on Chateau Marmont–headed paper and became known as the Chateau Drawings. He then sold them in a one-night exhibition in the hotel’s penthouse. The exhibition convinced Lang to relocate to Los Angeles permanently in 2012.

The Black Drawings series feature compositions that include skulls, horseback-riding skeletons, animals, monstrous creatures, and still lifes, often presented as vignettes. Many of the pieces incorporate phrases inspired by the Tao Te Ching and the spiritual teachings of Ram Dass, such as: ‘Become master of the moment’, ‘Achieve the highest levels of life’, ‘In harmony with all things.’ These statements, reflecting acceptance and humanism, underscore the artist's engagement with the fleeting and fragile nature of life.

=== Collaborations ===
In 2013, musician Kanye West licensed Lang's artwork for the Yeezus tour. Lang's designs were adapted for tour merchandise, including T-shirts. In February 2022, Lang collaborated with Mike Amiri for the Fall 2022 runway show of the fashion house AMIRI in Los Angeles. Lang contribution included gothic and graphic motifs of grim reapers, skeletons, and werewolves, which appeared on sweaters, shirts, outerwear, and a denim jacket. He also hand-painted select pieces for the show.

== Style and influences ==
Lang's works are defined by a gestural style, expressive brushstrokes, and dark tonal palettes. His interest in the skull motif traces back to childhood, as he recalls: “Something grabbed me about the skull when I was in elementary school, and it was so inexplicable to me.” Lang's use of the skull is also informed by his admiration for James Ensor and his skeleton-like characters.

Other influences on include Francis Bacon, the graphic style and dense layering of motifs of Jean-Michel Basquiat, the painterliness of Édouard Vuillard, and the early twentieth-century British painter Sir Alfred Munnings, particularly his representations of horses.

Lang's work and his reflections on life and death are shaped by spiritual and philosophical influences, most notably Taoism and the Tao Te Ching, which he reads each morning before beginning his work. He is also influenced by writing and teachings of Ram Dass, and his Be Here Now which his mother introduced to him.

== Representation ==
A mentor and friend of Lang is British artist Damien Hirst, who provided exhibition space for his work at the Newport Street Gallery in London. In 2014 Lang had an exhibition at the ARoS Aarhus Art Museum. His work is included in the permanent collections of the National Gallery of Denmark, the DESTE Foundation for Contemporary Art, and the Museum of Modern Art in New York.

== Exhibitions ==
- DADS, Gallery Anthony, Chicago, Illinois, (November 20, 2025 - January 10, 2026).
- The Good You Do Will Follow You, Gallery Masurel, Lyon, France, (November 27, 2025 - January 10, 2026).
- Thank You God, Heni Gallery, London, England, (October 13, 2025 - November 10, 2025).
- The Black Paintings (Goodness Will Be Everywhere), Newport Street Gallery, London, England, (ember 27, 2024 - March 9, 2025).
- Pink and Blue, Almine Rech Gallery, New York, USA, (January 6, 2022 - February 5, 2022).
