= Tolu Coker =

British-Nigerian fashion designer

- Education: Central Saint Martins
- Label: Tolu Coker
- Awards: Finalist, LVMH Prize (2025)
- Website: tolucoker.uk

Tolu Coker is a British-Nigerian fashion designer, textile designer and multidisciplinary artist based in London. Her work draws on British and Nigerian cultural histories, particularly the experiences of African diaspora communities, and frequently incorporates reused textiles and traditional craft techniques. She began developing her eponymous label in 2018 and formally launched it in 2021.

Coker was selected for the British Fashion Council's NewGen programme in 2023 and was one of eight finalists for the 2025 LVMH Prize for Young Fashion Designers. In February 2026, King Charles III attended her Autumn/Winter 2026 show at London Fashion Week.

== Early life and education ==
Coker was born in London to Nigerian parents and grew up in North Kensington in west London. Her father was a photographer and community organiser whose photographs of family life, protests and the changing neighbourhood later became reference material for her collections. Her mother made clothes for the family, including garments worn to church. Coker has also cited the exchange of clothing and household goods at Portobello Road Market and local car-boot sales as an early influence on her understanding of reuse.

She studied fashion design and textile print at Central Saint Martins, graduating with first-class honours in 2017. While studying, she undertook placements at Maison Margiela, J.W. Anderson and Celine. After graduating, she worked for a fast-fashion retailer in Spain before deciding to establish an independent practice.

== Career ==
Coker began presenting work under her own name in 2018. That year, she received the Diesel Award and the ITS Time for Coffee Award at the International Talent Support competition, as well as a special mention from Vogue Talents. Her first designer collection, Juvenile Consciousness, was presented during the Autumn/Winter 2019 season after she received the Fashion Scout Merit Award.

Although Coker had produced collections and multidisciplinary projects from 2018, later profiles describe 2021 as the formal launch of the Tolu Coker label. In 2022, she joined an experimental design programme established by artist Theaster Gates in Chicago, where participating designers received studio resources and mentoring.

In 2023, Coker was selected for NewGen, the British Fashion Council's support programme for emerging designers. Her first NewGen runway show at London Fashion Week presented the collection Irapada, a Yoruba word meaning "redemption". The collection combined Western forms of "Sunday best" clothing with references to Yoruba spirituality and Nigeria's Aladura churches, including tailored garments, printed hats and denim jacquards. The Guardian described it as her runway debut and noted its use of structured tailoring, corseted shirt dresses and printed separates.

Her Autumn/Winter 2024 collection, Broken English, drew partly on informal traders Coker had encountered in Ghana and on the circulation of discarded Western clothing through African markets. Coker has described the title as a double entendre: a celebration of the pidgin spoken among market traders and hawkers, and a reference to what she called the "necessary brokenness" of the idea of Englishness as the standard. Its London presentation turned the runway into a market-like streetscape and included tailored leather jackets, pleated skirts, corseted shirt dresses and sculptural headwear.

For Spring/Summer 2025, Coker created a collection based on the experiences and personal style of her mother, who had emigrated from Lagos to London. The show was staged in a set resembling a family living room, while prints and other visual details were derived from domestic photographs taken by Coker's father.

Coker continued to examine migration and ceremonial dress in her Autumn/Winter 2025 collection. It combined references to Black spiritual traditions in Nigeria, Louisiana, Haiti, Brazil and Cuba with British materials and garments, including tartan and white poplin shirts. In April 2025, she was announced as one of the eight finalists for that year's LVMH Prize. The prize was ultimately awarded to Soshi Otsuki of Soshiotsuki.

Instead of presenting her Spring/Summer 2026 collection as a conventional runway show, Coker and her brother Ade Coker co-directed the short film Unfinished Business. The film featured Naomi Campbell and a group of younger Black models in a domestic setting, with garments presented as objects passed between generations. The 15-minute film premiered during London Fashion Week in September 2025, at a presentation where selected looks from the collection were also shown.

In December 2025, Coker was nominated for the Vanguard Award at The Fashion Awards, where rapper Little Simz received the Cultural Innovator Award wearing a houndstooth Tolu Coker skirt suit.

Coker presented her Autumn/Winter 2026 collection, Survivor's Remorse, at London Fashion Week on 19 February 2026, her final show as a NewGen designer. The collection was an homage to Mozart Street, where she grew up, and the set recreated elements of the street, including lamps and a London Underground sign. King Charles III sat front row alongside Stella McCartney and British Fashion Council chief executive Laura Weir, while rapper Little Simz opened the show with a live performance. Coker, a former beneficiary of the King's Trust, called the King's attendance a "full circle moment". Pieces from an 18-piece capsule collection with Topshop, released in March 2026, were previewed on the runway.

In June 2026, Coker was one of six designers named as recipients of the BFC Fashion Trust, a grant programme run by the British Fashion Council. She was scheduled to present a womenswear collection during the September 2026 edition of London Fashion Week as part of the BFC Fashion Trust programme.

== Design ==
Coker's collections often combine British tailoring with references to Nigerian and wider African diaspora dress. Recurring elements include sculptural hats, flared suits, pleated skirts, West African-influenced waistcoats and British checks. Family photographs, domestic interiors, religious dress and the experiences of African immigrants in Britain have served as source material for several of her collections.

Her practice also makes use of deadstock and upcycled fabrics. Coker has described reuse as connected both to environmental concerns and to the resourcefulness she observed in West African markets. Her designs have addressed the representation of Black communities in luxury fashion. In a 2025 interview with The Guardian, she described participation in London Fashion Week as a means of giving greater visibility to stories that had historically received less attention.

Coker has called herself a "clothing historian" who makes clothing as a record of its moment. Her collections often begin with writing, sound or film, with music developed alongside the garments. All of the label's garments are manufactured in the United Kingdom.
