= Helmut Lang (artist) =

Austrian artist and fashion designer (born 1956)

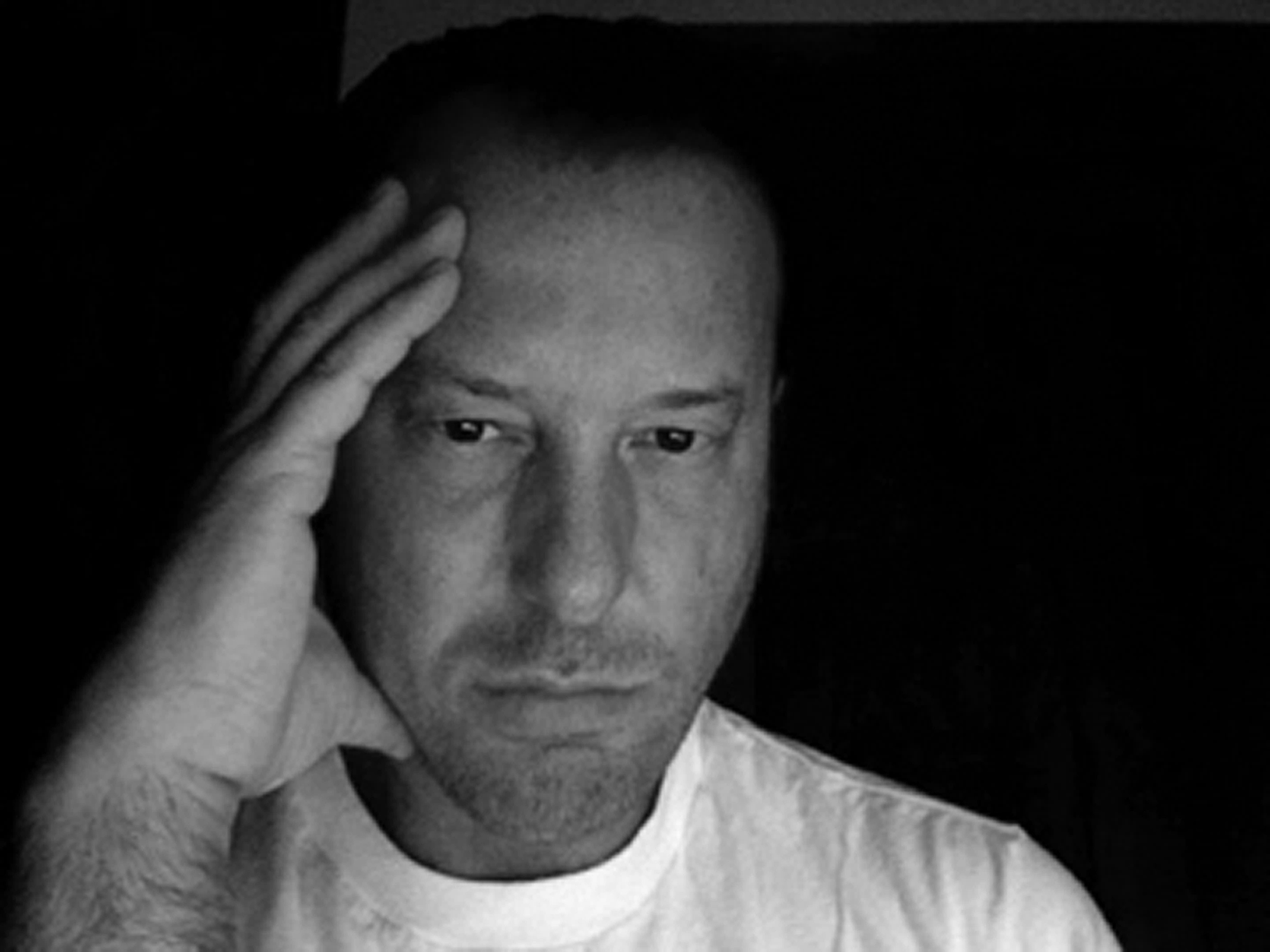
- Lang in 2007
- Born: Peter Scepka; 10 March 1956 (age 70); Vienna, Austria
- Known for: Fashion; architecture; sculpture
- Awards: Österreichischen Ehrenzeichens für Wissenschaft und Kunst, 2009

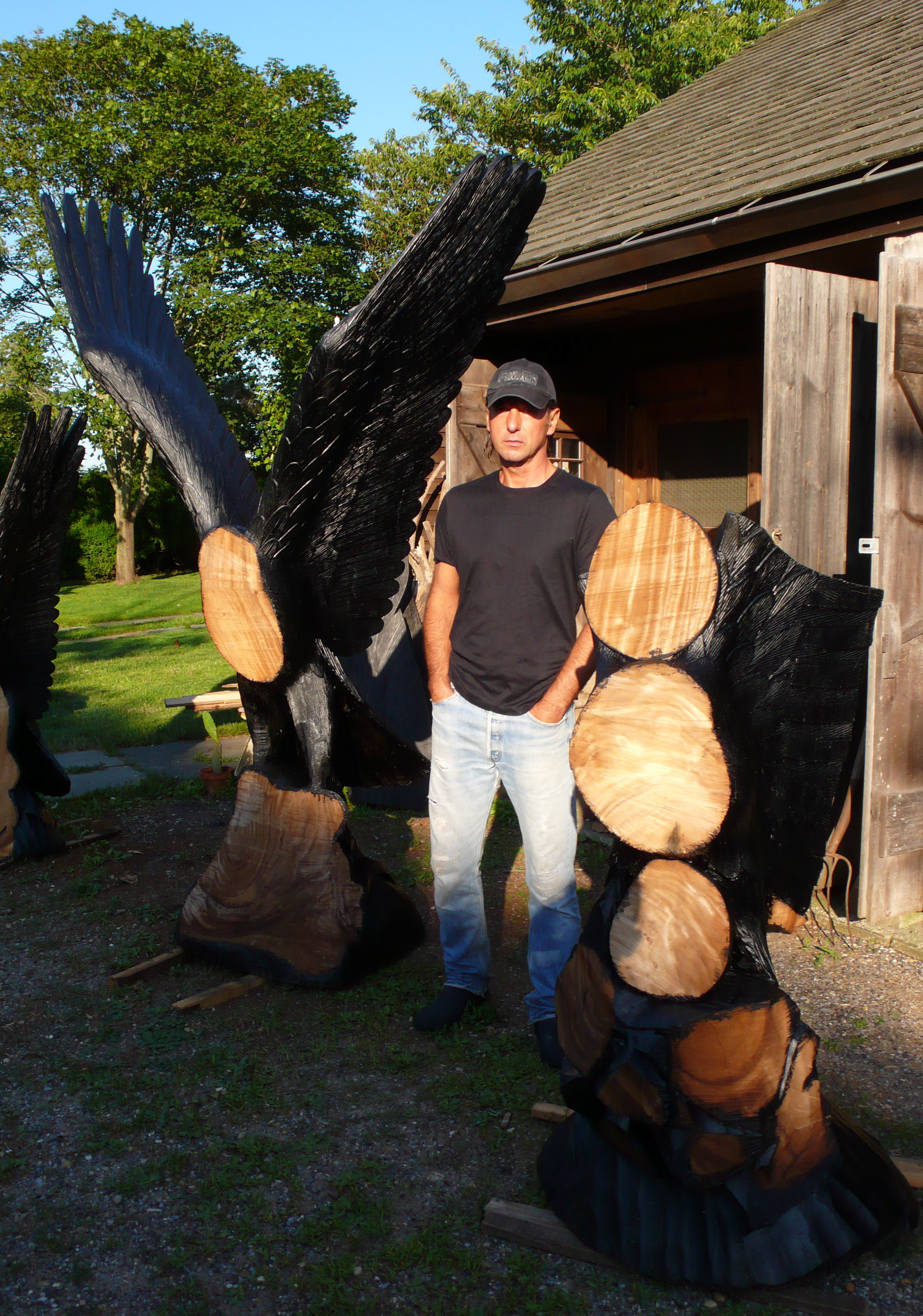
2008

Helmut Lang (born Peter Scepka; 10 March 1956) is an Austrian artist and former fashion designer and mentor who lives and works in New York and on Long Island.

== Career ==
In 1986, Lang showed his first Helmut Lang runway collection in Paris at Centre Georges Pompidou. His first Helmut men's collection debuted in 1987 and a decade later he moved his label from Vienna to New York.

Lang used unconventional materials such as rubber, feathers and metallic fabrics and redefined the silhouette of the 1990s and early 2000s. He broke away from the runway show-as-spectacle in the height of the 1980s opulence and was the first to stream his collection online in 1998.

Lang's brand was known for its utilitarian, minimalist aesthetic, as well as for his prestige range of denim.

In 1999, Lang sold a 51% stake in his company to the Prada Group, with Prada handling distribution and manufacturing and Lang retaining control of design and advertising. Afterwards, Prada developed a line of Helmut Lang accessories such as shoes, belts and bags, and opened Helmut Lang stores in Hong Kong and Singapore. Sales under the Prada Group fell from $100 million in 1999 to $37 million in 2003. The brand's decision to cancel the licensing agreement with an external company to manufacture and market its profitable range of Helmut Lang Jeans was cited as one of the reasons for its revenue loss. In 2005, he left his label and retired from fashion. He has since been based in New York City and on Long Island as a practising artist. In 2006, Prada sold the Helmut Lang brand to Link Theory Holdings.

Lang has collaborated with artists Jenny Holzer and Louise Bourgeois. His recent works explore abstract sculptural forms and physical arrangements beyond the limitations of the human body. Lang had his first solo art exhibition ALLES GLEICH SCHWER at the Kestnergesellschaft in Hannover in 2008 and has since presented solo exhibitions internationally. Lang has published excerpts from his ongoing art projects Long Island Diaries and The Selective Memory Series in several publications, such as Purple, BUTT Magazine , Fanzine 137 , Visionaire and most recently The Travel Almanac .

2026 https://www.mak.at/exhibition/helmutlang

== Work ==
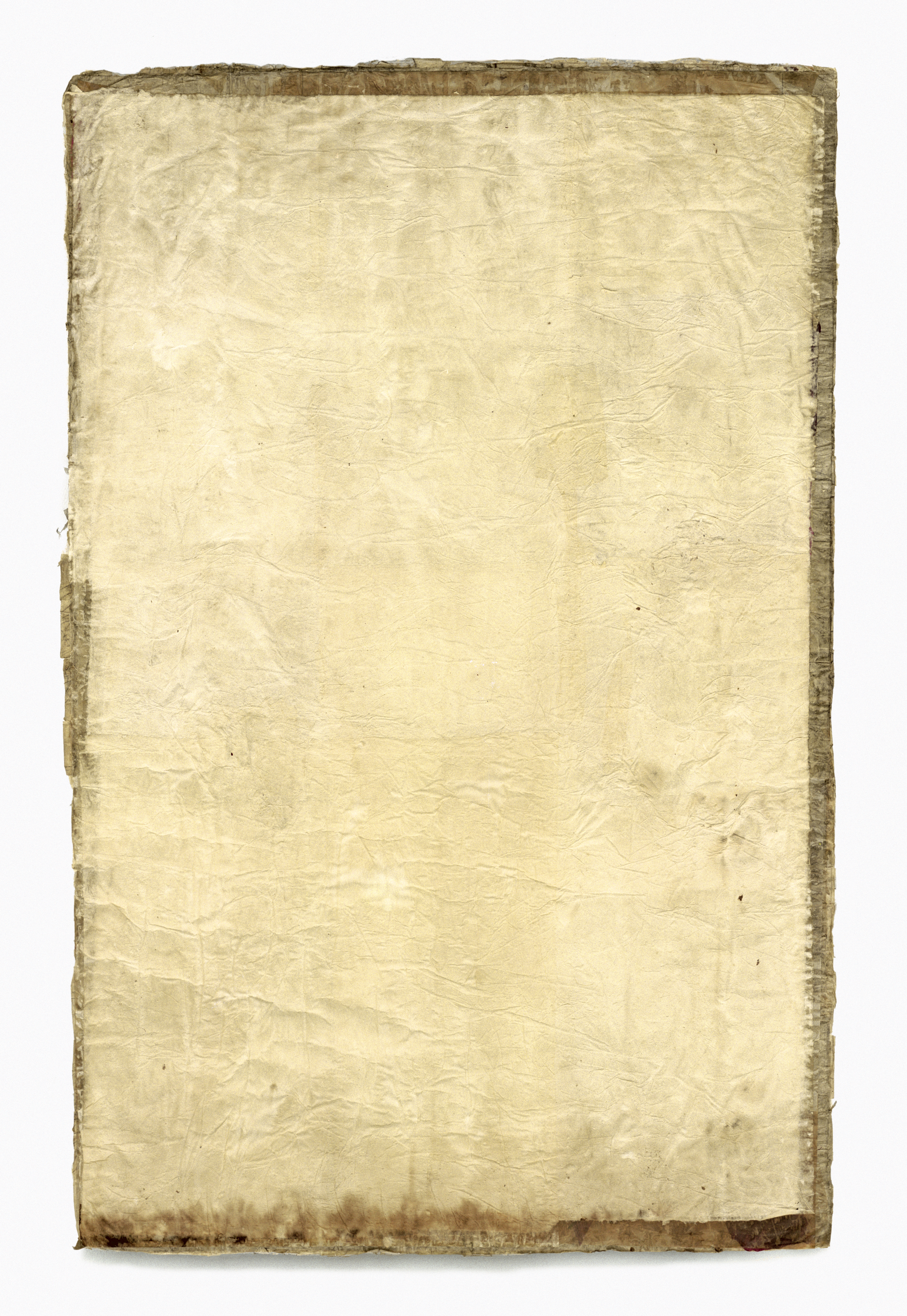
Surrogate Skin (2008), as displayed in the exhibition HELMUT LANG, ALLES GLEICH SCHWER at the kestnergesellschaft in Hanover, Germany, 2008

This timeline outlines Helmut Lang's work in fashion and art up until 2021.

Solo Exhibitions

1986	Viennese Modernism. Centre National d'Art et de Culture Georges Pompidou, Paris
2007	Selective Memory Series, Purple Institute, Paris
2007	Next Ever After, The Journal Gallery, Brooklyn
2008	Archive, 032c Museum Store, Berlin
2008	Alles Gleich Schwer, kestnergesellschaft, Hanover
2011	Make It Hard, The Fireplace Project, East Hampton
2012	Sculptures, Mark Fletcher, New York
2015	Helmut Lang, Sperone Westwater, New York
2016	BURRY, Dallas Contemporary, Dallas
2017	new work, Sperone Westwater, New York
2017	Various Conditions, Stradtraum, Vienna
2017	Various Conditions, Sammlung Friedrichshof, Zurndorf
2019	network, Tennis Elbow at The Journal Gallery, New York
2019	63, von ammon co, Washington, D.C.
2020	41.1595° N, 73.3882° W, MoCA Westport, Westport
2025	What remains behind, MAK Center at the Schindler House, West Hollywood, CA

Group Exhibitions

1997	I Smell You on My Clothes, Florence Biennale, Florence
1997	Art/Fashion, Guggenheim Museum SoHo, New York
1998	Louise Bourgeois / Jenny Holzer / Helmut Lang, Kunsthalle Wien, Vienna
2009	Industrial Light Magic, Goethe-Institut, New York
2010	Not in Fashion, Museum für Moderne Kunst, Frankfurt
2011	Austria Davaj!, Shchusev Museum of Architecture, Moscow
2011	Commercial Break, Venice Biennale, Venice
2012	Helmut Lang / Banks Violette / Dan Colen, Mark Fletcher, New York
2013	The System of Objects, Deste Foundation, Athens
2015	Space and Matter, Sperone Westwater, New York
2018	Wormwood, Ellis King, Dublin
2019	SMILE, Halsey McKay, East Hampton
2020	100 Sculptures, no gallery, Los Angeles
2020	FOCUS GROUP II, von ammon co, Washington, D.C.
2020	everything not saved will be lost, FF Projects, San Pedro Garza García
2021	WOOD WORKS: Raw, Cut, Carved, Covered, Sperone Westwater, New York
2021	ALIEN NATION, von ammon co, Washington, D.C.
2021	Punk Is Coming, MoCA Westport
2021	HOW DOES ONE THINK OF NOTHING?, FF projects, San Pedro
2022	FOCUS GROUP 3, von ammon co, Washington, D.C.
2023	FOCUS GROUP 4, von ammon co, Washington, D.C.

== Helmut Lang fashion 1977–2005 ==
This timeline outlines the developments in Lang's fashion as well significant attributes of key collections.

1977

- Opens made-to-measure studio in Vienna.

1980–84

- Development of signature collections and made-to-measure service in Vienna.

1986

- First presentation in Paris. Shown off the Paris fashion calendar as part of the exhibition "Vienne 1880–1939: L'Apocalypse Joyeuse" at The Centre National d'Art et de Culture Georges Pompidou.

1987

- Introduction of the first Helmut Lang Men's collection. Women and Men's collections are shown together on the Paris fashion calendar. Men's silhouette marked the return of the narrow and tailored suit shown with the white shirt, black tie, and made-to-measure shoes.

1988

- Rejects the structure of the traditional fashion show. Introduces the concept of “Séance de Travail.”

1990

- Introduces layering of transparent fabrics in new materials and textures. New approach towards the treatment of these.
- Introduction of Helmut Lang footwear

1991

- Introduces wet looks, thermal fabrics, paper dresses and Native American influences.

1992

- Introduces extremely shiny fabrics and textures. Thermal leathers, technical fabrics, padded clothing and body-conscious shapes.

1993

- A/W '93–'94. Street style / haute couture presented in wool knits, pure cashmere and velvet. Trademark slit and slashed sleeves first introduced.
- S/S '94. Introduces cuffed pants, holographic fabrics, holographic sterling silver jeans, lacquered silks, phantom prints, apron dresses, colored tuxedo stripes, stretch daytime smoking coats, raw denim and customized silk dresses. Introduces hand-sprayed shoes and customized dancing shoes.
- First separate Men's presentation. Men's S/S '94 shown as part of the Paris fashion calendar.
- Begins collaboration with Juergen Teller on backstage documentation and advertising.
- Lang accepted a professorship at 'Modeklasse', the famous department of fashion design at the University of Applied Arts Vienna.

1994

- A/W '94–'95. Latex-bounded lace, lacquered silks, smoking coats and suits, nylon veil dresses, airbrushed silks and slash geometric patterns on candy-colored fabrics. Introduced reflective fabrics and nude as staple color.
- First show presented at 17 Rue Commines.
- S/S '95. "Hawaiian techno,” high-tech and air-tech. New nylon fabrics introduced.

1995

- A/W '95–'96. “Couture customized”, camel and tweeds, bra holsters, chiffon and faille. Introduces two-color bloc paneling.
- Introduction of Helmut Lang underwear.
- S/S '96. New take on lace for men and women, delicate materials, electro vibe, visible bras, apron belts and contrast layering.

1996

- A/W '96–'97. Techno jungle, covered sequins, floral patterns, cargo styles, Japanese Obi style tops and evening dresses. Introduces signature uniform outerwear. Presented with gold blanked covered audience.
- Introduction of Helmut Lang Jeans, featuring khakis, chinos, denims, work wear, casual wear, functionals and protective wear.
- S/S '97. Introduction of sashes, festive and ceremonial wear, dislodged lingerie, tuxedo accessories and colored denim.

1997

- A/W '97–'98. Shift toward luxury with the use of classic and pure materials. Reintroduction of fine cashmeres, blended wools and silks. Introduction of funnel neck coats and pleated skirts. Silk tulle, cummerbunds and silk down coated duvet wraps. Definition of new Helmut Lang style with made-to-measure finishing.
- Second separate Men's presentation. Men's S/S 98 collection shown as part of the New York fashion calendar.
- S/S '98. Introduction of A-line skirt and dresses. Usage of crinoline and pleats. Reintroduction of the classic white T-shirt. For men, introduction of the urban utilitarian. Vintage, painted and sanded denim. Introduction of fold-out clothes.
- Introduction of “accessoire vêtements.”.
- Starts collaboration with Jenny Holzer on all Helmut Lang stores.

1998

- Relocates company from Vienna to New York. First fashion house to make a transcontinental move.
- Presentation of the A/W '98–'99 collection over the Internet. First-ever Internet-based fashion show. Launch of helmutlang.com.’’
- Moves the presentation venue from Paris to New York, beginning with the A/W '98–'99 collection.
- Introduction of Helmut Lang Eyewear.
- Helmut Lang advertises on New York taxi rooftops. ‘’First fashion house to use this advertising channel’’. Features photography by Robert Mapplethorpe and Bruce Weber.
- A/W '98–'99. Luxury sportswear translated to luxury eveningwear. Couture-sportwear, volume and silk-furs. Introduction of the signature parka and burnt denim.
- For the S/S '99 collection, Helmut Lang moves the presentation ahead of the European schedule (from November to September), having the impact of shifting the entire fashion calendar.’’
- S/S '99. Utilitarian motorbike pants and arm bags. Flower and phantom prints, washed silver platinum leathers, silk feather coats and peasant looks. Introduction of extensions as major detail.

1999

- A/W '99–'00. Introduction of interior strap extensions. Introduction of shearing and colored leathers. Pure sterling silver fabrics and anti-stress materials. Introduction of the neck-rest.
- S/S '00. Electric colors, training gear attributes translated into haute couture cuts and fabric, silk organza, feather detailing and transparent layering.
- Introduction of an extended luxury bag and shoe collection.
- Introduction of the signature industrial rubber band as functional part of accessories and shoes.

2000

- A/W '00–'01. Monochromatic uniforms.
- S/S '01. Entomologic and marine biological structures. Austrian “Dirndl” influences, sharp strap compositions and lace-up.
- Launch of Helmut Lang fragrance, Men and Women. Collaboration with Jenny Holzer on fragrance advertising.

2001

- A/W '01–'02. Opaque and sheer contrasts, luxury materials, organza and leather trim details.
- S/S '02. Block panels, patent leather, leopard print silk, fold prints, architectural construction, organza layering and Viennese crochet. Introduction of accessory holsters and fragment pieces,

2002

- A/W '02–'03. Structured layering, re-worked fisherman knits, monochromatic and metal blocks, combined scarf-tops and further incorporation of movement.
- Moves the presentation of collections back to Paris. Separate Men's presentations through 2004. Women's presentations continues to be shown together with men's.
- S/S '03. Surf references, Montauk-inspired, bright Day-Glo colors, bubble-wrap plastic, high contrast compositions, abstracted wetsuit bands, surf tails, cutouts, inside out made-to-measure trousers, laundry bag pattern, zipper surf couture, zipper smoking stripes and rubber signal prints.
- Limited-edition silver choker by Louise Bourgeois.
- Opens made-to-measure studio in New York.

2003

- A/W '03–'04. “Urban Warrior” vernacular, aviation fragmented pieces, magnetic flaps, petaled organza, layering as clothing extension, interchangeable and modular pieces, one leg smoking chap and parachute holsters. Introduction of chaps for men and women. Introduction of cashmere and fleece fused material.
- Collaboration with Louise Bourgeois in the creation of limited-edition pieces.
- Music by Brigitte Cornand featuring vocals by Louise Bourgeois
- S/S 04. “Dragonfly,” cut outs, battered metal, extended fragment accessories, ornamental pouches, hand wraps, wide color palette, entomologia and urban cowboy references.
- Introduction of metallic patent leather in clothing and accessories.

2004

- A/W 04-05. Eastern European influences, colored shearing, horsehair, copper leather, Hungarian pleats, French maid look, cummerbund tops, drapée holsters, skirt capes, French lace and Russian bark pattern. Introduction of made-to-measure evening dresses.
- Collaboration with Louise Bourgeois in the creation of limited edition pieces.
- S/S 05. Maritime, rope and knot detailing, bathing suit trompe l’oeil waist. 1000 eye / pearl pieces, fishtails and sailor pant tuxedos. Introduction of elastic seersucker.

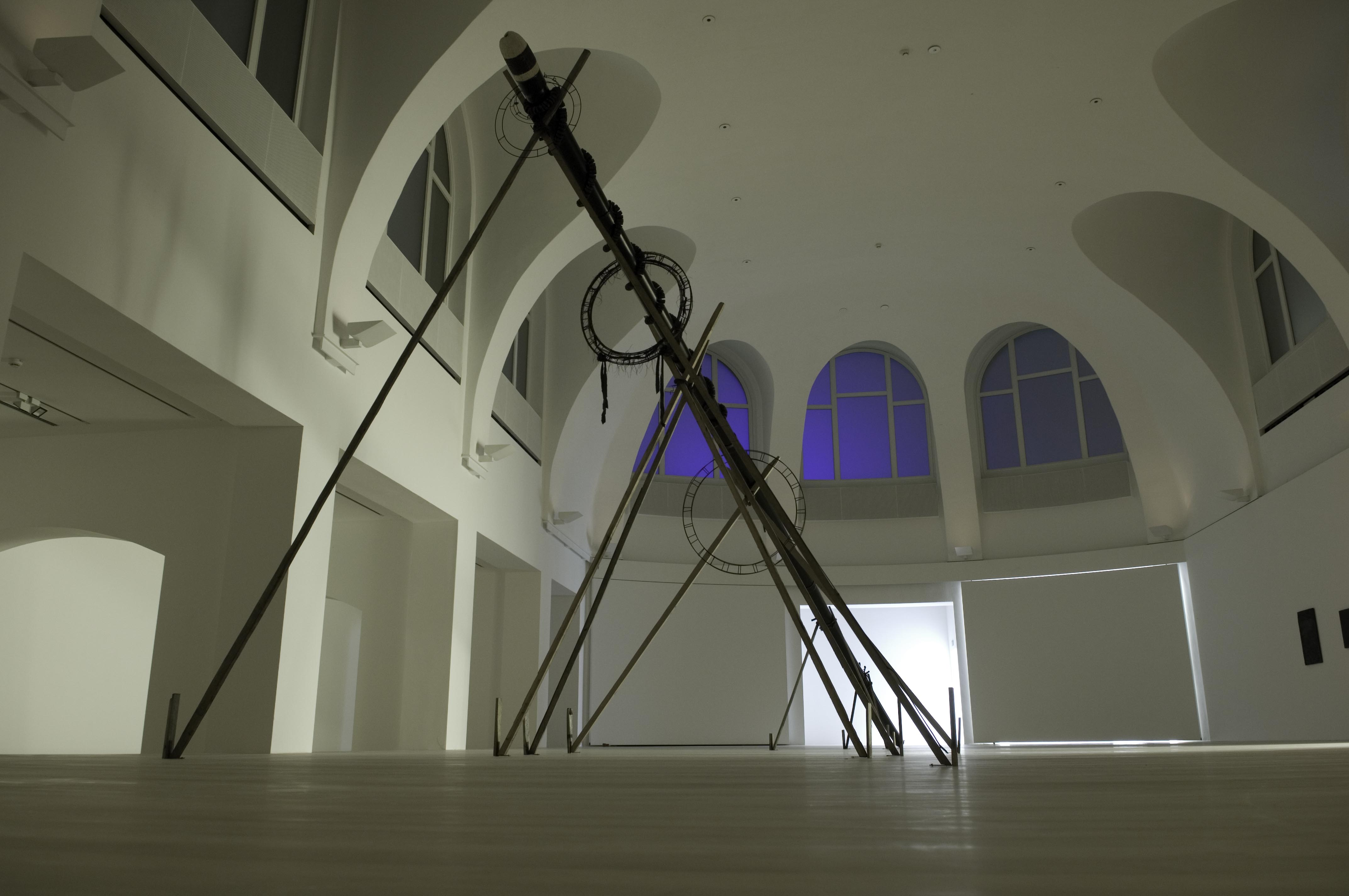
Arbor (2008), as displayed in the exhibition HELMUT LANG, ALLES GLEICH SCHWER at the kestnergesellschaft in Hanover, Germany, 2008

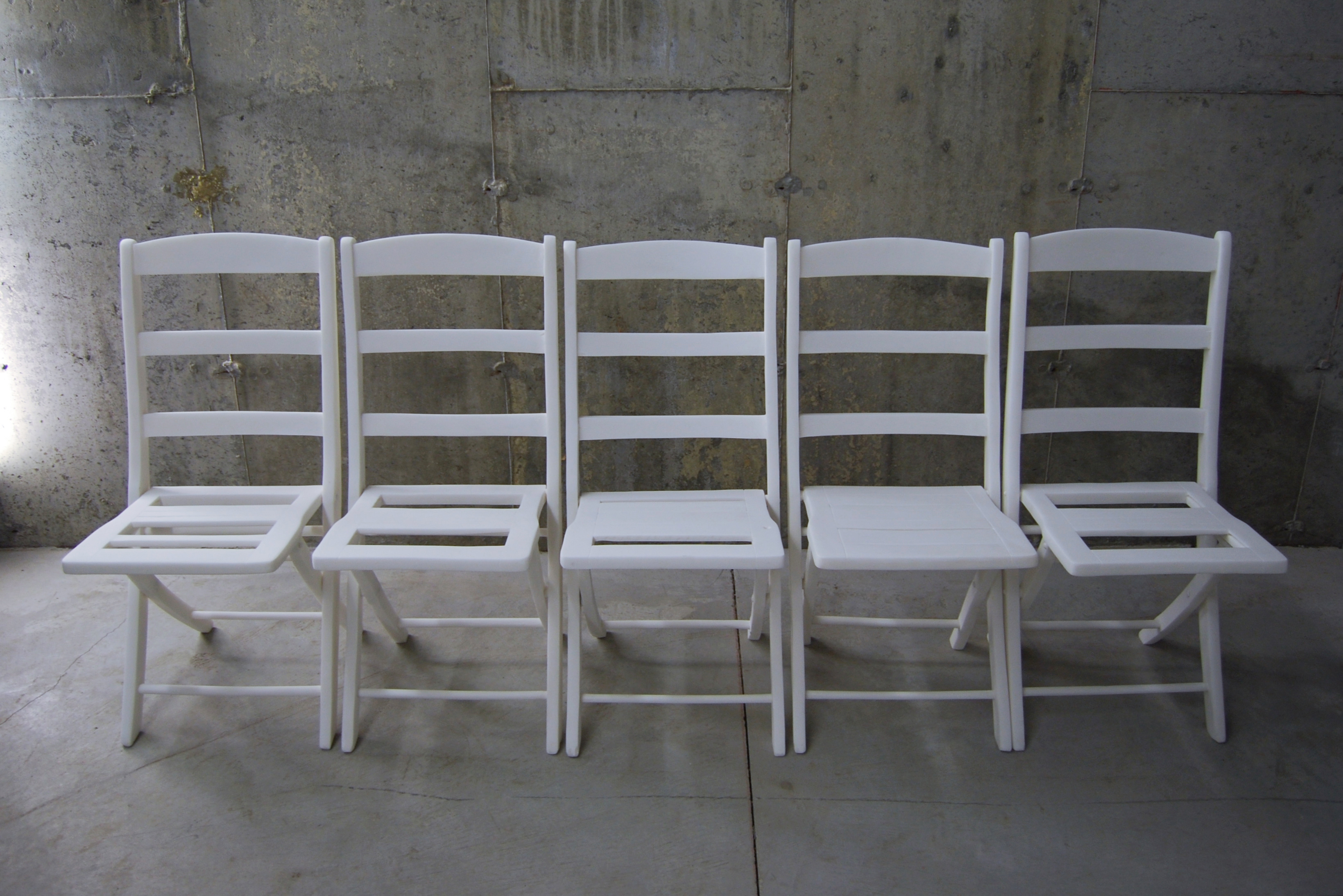
Front Row (2009), sculpture commissioned by the Deste Foundation for Contemporary Art, Athens

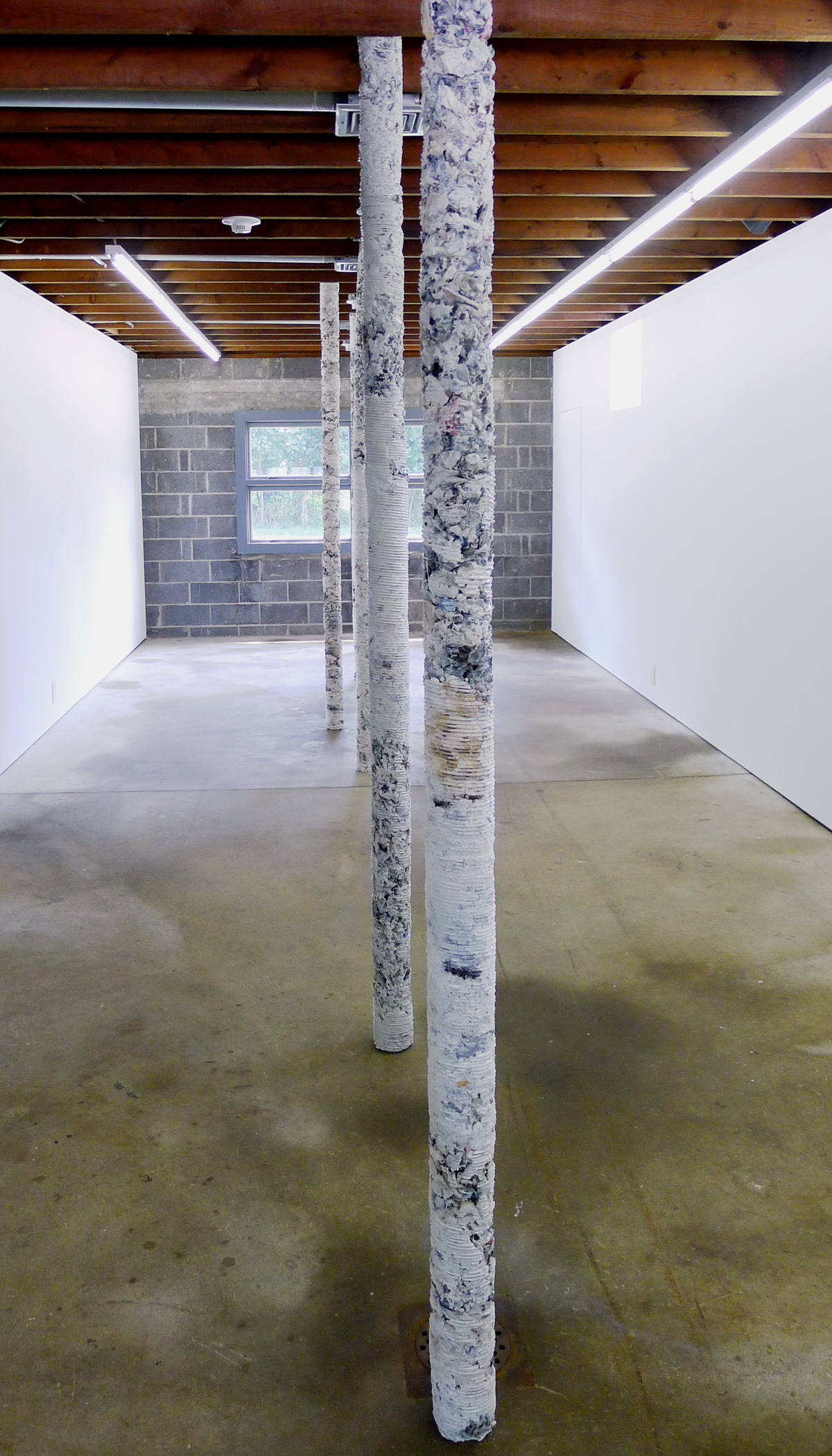
MAKE IT HARD (2011), as displayed at The Fireplace Project in East Hampton, 2011

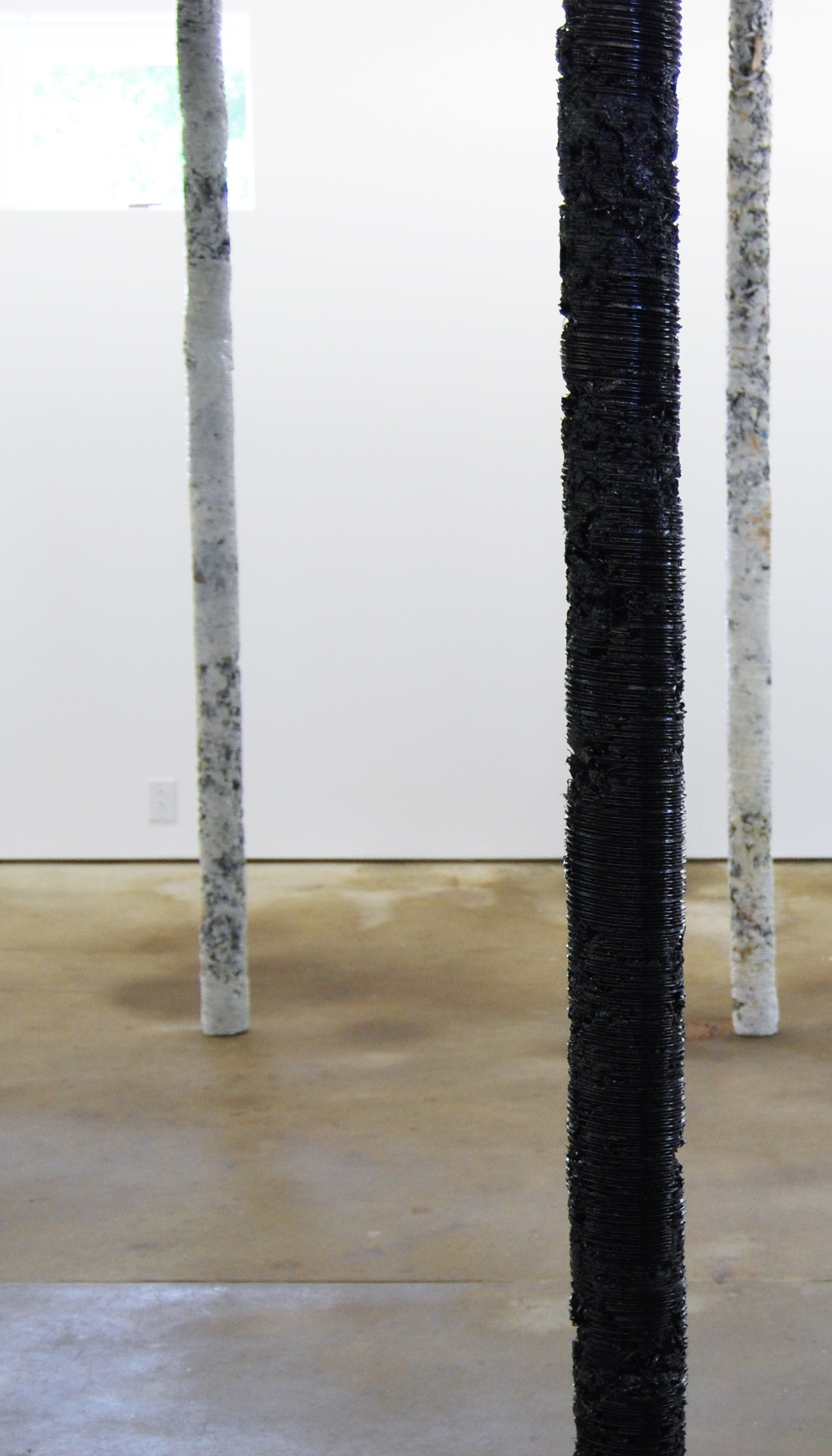
MAKE IT HARD (2011), as displayed at The Fireplace Project in East Hampton, 2011

== Collections ==
Helmut Lang's works are part of the following collections:

- Costume Institute at The Metropolitan Museum of Art, New York
- Deste Foundation for Contemporary Art, Athens
- Fashion Museum, Bath, United Kingdom
- Groninger Museum, Groninger, The Netherlands
- LACMA, Los Angeles
- MAK, Museum of Applied Arts / Contemporary Art, Vienna, Austria
- Museum of Fine Arts, Boston
- MOMU, Antwerp, Belgium
- Musée de la Mode et du Textile, Paris
- Musée Galliera, Paris
- Museo de la Moda, Santiago, Chile
- Phoenix Art Museum, Phoenix, USA
- SONS, Kruishoutem, Belgium
- The Arts Center, Melbourne, Australia
- The Museum at The Fashion Institute of Technology, New York
- The National Museum of Art, Architecture and Design, Oslo, Norway

== Architecture projects ==
Original Helmut Lang stores (until 2005)

All of the original Helmut Lang stores have been closed. The last one to close was the Paris location in late 2005. Most of the art-inspired stores had been designed by Lang in collaboration with Gluckman Mayner Architects of New York.

1995

- Helmut Lang Munich, Kardinal-Faulhaber-Straße, 3, 80333, Munich, Germany.
- Helmut Lang Milan, Via St. Andrea, 14, 20212, Milan, Italy.

1997

- Helmut Lang Vienna, Seilergasse, 6, 1010, Vienna, Austria.
- Helmut Lang New York, Worldwide Flagship Store, 80 Greene Street, New York, NY 10012.
- Helmut Lang Headquarters, 80 Greene Street, New York, NY 10012, USA.

2000

- Helmut Lang Paris, Store-within-a-store, Printemps, 64 Bld. Haussman, 75451, Paris, France.
- Helmut Lang Hong Kong, Store-within-a-store, 228–230 Landmark Central, Hong Kong.
- Helmut Lang Singapore, Store-within-a-store, 9 Scott Road #02-10/11/12/13, Pacific Plaza, 228210, Singapore.
- Helmut Lang Aichi, Store-within-a-store, Nagoya Mitsukoshi, Mitsukoshi Nagoya Sakae 2F, 3–5–1 Sakae, Naka-ku Nagoya, Aichi, Japan.
- Helmut Lang Tokyo, Store-within-a-store, Isetan Shinjuku Men, Isetan Shinjuku Men's-Kan 3F, 3–14–1 Shinjuku, Shinjuku, Tokyo.
- Helmut Lang Tokyo, Store-within-a-store, Isetan Shinjuku Women, Isetan Shinjuku Annex Building 4F, 3–14–1 Shinjuku, Shinjuku, Tokyo.
- Helmut Lang Tokyo, Store-within-a-store, Shibuya Seibu Men, Seibu Shibuya Annex B 1F/4F, 21–1 Udagawa-cho, Shibuya, Tokyo.
- Helmut Lang Tokyo, Store-within-a-store, Shibuya Seibu Women, Seibu Shibuya Annex B 1F/4F, 21–1 Udagawa-cho, Shibuya.
- Helmut Lang Seoul, Store-within-a-store, 2F, Shinsegae Department Store Kangnam Branch, 19–3 Banpo-dong, Seocho-ku, Seoul.
- Helmut Lang Kobe, Dainichi-Akashicho Building 18, Akashi-cho, Chuo-ku, Kobe-shi, Hyogo, Japan.
- Helmut Lang Parfums New York, 81 Greene Street, New York, NY 10012.

2002

- Helmut Lang Studio, 142 Greene Street, New York, NY 10012.
- Helmut Lang Made-to-Measure New York, 142 Greene Street, New York, NY 10012.

2003

- Helmut Lang Paris, 219 Rue Saint-Honore, 75001, Paris.
- Helmut Lang Milan (new location), Via della Spiga, 11, Milan, 20121.

== Fragrance Projects ==
Four different scents were created by Lang in cooperation with Procter & Gamble, all of which were discontinued with the 2005 closing of the brand.

- Helmut Lang (Women's) – 2000
- Helmut Lang Pour Homme (Men's) – 2001
- Helmut Lang Velviona (women's and men's) – limited release available exclusively at New York store – 2001
- Helmut Lang Cuiron (men's) – 2002

== Awards ==
- CFDA, Best International Designer of the Year, 1996.
- VH-1/Vogue Award, Best Menswear Designer of the Year, 1997.
- Fine Arts of Vienna, 1997.
- Pitti Immagine Award, Best Designer of the Nineties, 1998.
- New York Magazine Best Designer of the Year Award, 1998.
- I.D. Magazine, Design Distinction Award for Environments, 1998.
- NYC Chapter of the American Institute of Architects: Award for Interiors, 1998.
- Business Week/Architectural Record Award, 1999.
- The American Institute of Architects, Award for Interior Architecture, 1999.
- CFDA Menswear Designer of the Year, 2000.
- GQ Designer of the Year, 2004.
- Fashion Group International,“The Imagineers of Our Time" Award, 2004.
- LEAD Award, 2005.
- Austrian Decoration for Science and Art, 2009

== Bibliography ==
Key interviews

- Armstrong, Annie. “'There is No Plan B’: Helmut Lang on Turning His Fashion Archive into Sculpture." artnews.com (ARTnews). 19 September 2019.
- Belcove, Julie L. “From Fashion to Art: Helmut Lang’s Second Act." wsj.com (WSJ.). 6 January 2015.
- Borrelli-Persson, Laird. “'No Regrets.' Helmut Lang Speaks About His 'Living Archive' Intervention at the MAK in Vienna and His Work in Fashion." vogue.com (Vogue). 26 February 2020.
- Bourgeois, Louise, "Louise Bourgeois on...Helmut Lang," Wallpaper. October 2008.
- Frankel, Susannah, "Helmut Lang," AnOther Magazine. September 2010.
- Gavin, Francesca. “A Rare Interview with Helmut Lang." anothermag.com (AnOther Magazine). 20 September 2019.
- McGrath, Charles. “A Seamless Transition From Fashion to Art." The New York Times. 1 May 2012.
- Obrist, Hans-Ulrich, "Helmut Lang," The Observer, November 2008.
- Petronio, Ezra, "Front Row." Self Service. June 2010.
- Porter, Charlie. "Helmut Lang." i-D. August 2008.
- Solway, Diane. "Helmut Lang." W. October 2008.
- Thompson, Allese. “500 Words: Helmut Lang." artforum.com (Artforum). 16 January 2015.
- Wakefield, Neville. "Conversation Between Helmut Lang and Neville Wakefield." absolut.com/helmutlang. September 2008.
- Wakefield, Neville. “Helmut Lang”. The Journal. January 2007.
