= Thebe Magugu =

South African fashion designer (born 1993)

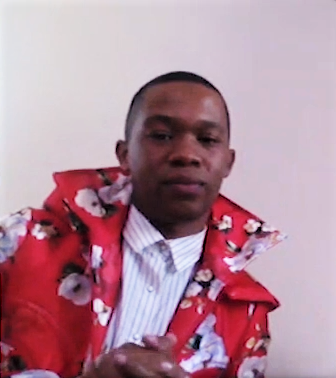
- Magugu in 2019
- Born: Thebetsile Magugu; 1 September 1993 (age 32); Kimberley, Northern Cape, South Africa
- Education: London International School of Fashion, Johannesburg
- Label: Thebe Magugu
- Awards: LVMH Young Fashion Designer Prize (2019)
- Website: thebemagugu.com

Thebetsile "Thebe" Magugu (born 1 September 1993) is a South African fashion designer. Born in Kimberley and based in Johannesburg, he rose to prominence as the winner of the 2019 LVMH Young Fashion Designer Prize, and a finalist in the 2021 International Woolmark Prize. Magugu has released eleven solo collections under his own namesake label since 2017, as well as several capsules in collaboration with international brands such as Dior, Adidas, and AZ Factory.

== Early life ==
Magugu was born in the township of Ipopeng on the outskirts of Kimberley, on 1 September 1993. He is of Sotho ancestry. He was educated at St. Patrick's Christian Brothers' College in Kimberley, and then at the London International School of Fashion (LISOF) in Johannesburg, where he studied fashion design, fashion photography and fashion media.

== Career ==
=== 2016–2018: Early career and national breakthrough ===
After graduating from LISOF, Magugu established his eponymous label in Johannesburg in 2016. Released in the spring/summer season of 2017, his debut collection titled Geology was featured in Vogue Italia. Magugu's following collections included Home Economics for the autumn/winter 2018 season, and Gender Studies for the spring/summer 2018 season, both of which were shown at South African Fashion Week and were notably photographed on scarecrows instead of supermodels. This was followed by the Art History collection in spring/summer 2019, and African Studies in autumn/winter 2019.

=== 2019–present: International breakthrough ===
In 2019, Magugu was announced as the winner of the International Fashion Showcase by the British Fashion Council. He then became the first African to be awarded the 2019 LVMH Young Fashion Designer Prize, which earned him 300,000 euros and a year's worth of mentoring from LVMH. President of South Africa, Cyril Ramaphosa, subsequently commended Magugu and wrote that "his level of consciousness he brings to his artistry is most inspiring and distinguishes him from his contemporaries". Magugu presented his debut collection at the Palais de Tokyo during Paris Fashion Week for the autumn/winter season titled Anthro 1. His first-ever menswear line was released in collaboration with Dover Street Market in London in September of that year.

Magugu designed a dress entitled "Girl Seeks Girl", which was exhibited at the Metropolitan Museum of Art in 2021. This was followed by the Fingerprint Knitted Dress, which American singer Dionne Warwick wore in a short film directed by Solange Knowles titled "Passage", which served as his entry to the 2021 International Woolmark Prize, where he was shortlisted as a finalist. Inspired by family, his collection Genealogy was released during Paris Fashion Week in September 2021 alongside a short film for the spring/summer 2022 season.

In early 2022, Magugu was enlisted by AZ Factory, a brand under Israeli fashion designer Alber Elbaz and Swiss fashion house Richemont, to collaborate on the Amigos clothing line. He partnered with German apparel company Adidas to design a tennis collection which would be worn by athletes Dana Mathewson, Stefanos Tsitsipas, Felix Auger Aliassime, Jessica Pegula and Dominic Thiem at the 2022 US Open. He collaborated with Adidas again in that same year to design a local sportswear collection titled Finding Beauty. In August 2022, American fashion magazine Vogue published a special feature titled "Designer Swap" which saw a collaboration between Magugu and Pierpaolo Piccioli of Valentino. Magugu's Spring 2023 collection, titled Discard Theory, debuted at the Victoria and Albert Museum in October 2022 as part of London Fashion Week. He then was enlisted by Italian fashion designer Maria Grazia Chiuri to reinterpret the "New Look" for French luxury house Dior in a limited-edition capsule collection, whose proceeds would go to the Charlize Theron Africa Outreach Project. His Fall/Winter 2023 collection, titled Folklorics, debuted at the Sphere Gallery in the Palais de Tokyo during Paris Fashion Week. A piece from the collection was featured in the Sleeping Beauties: Reawakening Fashion exhibition at the Metropolitan Museum of Art in New York City in May 2024.

In May 2024, Magugu opened the brand's first permanent retail location, Magugu House, in the Johannesburg suburb of Dunkeld. Housed in a restored 1930s building, it combines a shop and showroom with two small galleries used for exhibitions connected to Magugu's collections. Time included Magugu House in its 2024 list of the World's Greatest Places.

== Personal life ==
Magugu is a member of the LGBTQIA+ community.
