= Phoebe Philo =

British fashion designer

Phoebe Philo OBE
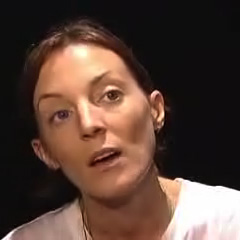
- Philo in 2008
- Born: 25 October 1973 (age 53); Paris, France
- Education: Central Saint Martins
- Occupation: Fashion designer
- Spouse: Max Wigram (m. 2004)
- Children: 3

Phoebe Philo OBE (born 25 October 1973) is an English fashion designer. She was the creative director of fashion brands Céline from 2008 to 2017 and Chloé from 2001 to 2006. Her eponymous line launched in 2023.

== Early life ==
=== Background ===
Philo was born in Paris to British parents working there. Her father, Richard, is a surveyor and her mother, Celia, is an art dealer and graphic artist who had a hand in creating David Bowie's Aladdin Sane album cover. The family returned to Britain when she was two years old, and she was raised in Harrow, London, with her two younger siblings Louis and Frankie. In 1987, at the age of 14, she began customizing her clothes after receiving a sewing machine as a birthday present from her parents.

=== Studies ===
Philo studied at Central Saint Martins College of Art and Design in London, graduating in 1996. She graduated showing a final student collection that The Guardian would later describe as having a "Latino influence and huge gold jewellery". She quickly joined Chloé as Stella McCartney's first assistant for ready-to-wear collection in Paris.

== Career ==
=== Chloé, 1997–2006 ===
Philo began working for Chloé in 1997 as Stella McCartney's design assistant, succeeding her as creative director in 2001. At Chloé, she was credited with contrasting babydoll dresses with heavy leather accessories, such as the Paddington bag. During that time, she also became the first designer at a major fashion brand to take an official extended maternity leave. In 2002, Philo commissioned Sophie Hicks to create a concept for the Chloé stores. During her time at Chloé, Philo brought "easy-to-wear, feelgood designs, which mix boyish and girlish, retro and contemporary in a deft way". In 2006 Philo left Chloé. She subsequently moved back to London to be with her family and had her second child.

=== Céline, 2008–2017 ===
In 2008, LVMH offered Philo a job as creative director and board member of the French Maison Céline. She agreed on condition that she continue working in London whilst showing in Paris, and devoted the first year to rebuilding the business by opening a design studio in a derelict Georgian town house on Cavendish Square in London. She presented her debut collection the next year. In 2010, the inaugural issue of The Gentlewoman featured Philo on the cover.

Philo’s tenure at Céline was marked by a succession of phenomenally successful bags, among them the Trapeze and Luggage totes, and the slim Trio cross-body. In 2013, she also created a sandal inspired by a classic Birkenstock with a mink covered footbed. Philo’s first ad campaign for Céline notably did not include the heads of the models, ensuring the focus would be on the clothes and bags. For her 2015 ad campaign, Juergen Teller photographed writer Joan Didion. For Céline’s Spring/Summer 2017 collection, Philo worked with artist Dan Graham to create Showing off the body (2016), a glass S-shaped pavilion at the Tennis Club de Paris in which the runway show took place during Paris Fashion Week in 2016. Philo revived Celine by seeking to redefine what women want to wear, with minimalist aesthetics, clean lines and tonal color palettes. According to New York Times fashion critic Vanessa Friedman, Philo “made Céline matter in a way it never had before”.

In 2017 after 10 years of working at Céline and much speculation in the media Philo announced to her team that she would be leaving after the Pre-Fall 2018 collection.

=== Phoebe Philo, 2021–present ===
In 2021, Philo announced she would launch a brand under her own name. She and her husband are the majority owners of the business, with LVMH being a minority shareholder. In October 2023, the brand launched a debut collection exclusively available on phoebephilo.com that was described as reflecting the quiet luxury trend. The brand's headquarters are located in Ladbroke Grove.

In April 2024, the brand started an exclusive distribution deal with Bergdorf Goodman. before expanding 10 Corso Como in Milan, Dover Street Market in London and Paris, Maxfield and Neiman Marcus in Los Angeles, and The Webster in Miami later that year.

The company recorded turnover of £11.2 million in 2024, its first full year of trading, with wholesale and concessions accounting for approximately one-third of sales. In January 2026, The Business of Fashion reported that the company had forecast revenue exceeding £32 million for 2025 in a filing with Companies House.

== Style and influence ==
Philo's work at Céline has been associated with an approach to womenswear combining practicality with experimentation. In 2023, Vogue described her influence on clothing that balanced everyday function with fantasy, while noting that her collections incorporated bold colour and romantic elements beyond their reputation for minimalism.

Her influence has also extended through designers who worked under her, including Daniel Lee, Peter Do and Rok Hwang. Writing in 2021, Nicole Phelps identified their subsequent careers as part of Philo's legacy and observed that her Céline collections continued to inform other designers after her departure.

Philo developed a devoted following known as "Philophiles".

== Recognition ==
- 2014 New Year Honours: Officer of the Order of the British Empire (OBE) for services to fashion
- 2014: World's 100 most influential people by Time
- 2011: International Designer of the Year by the CFDA
- 2010: British Designer of the Year by the British Fashion Council
- 2005: British Designer of the Year by the British Fashion Council
- 2003: "Best Dressed" by January issue of Vogue

== Personal life ==
Philo married English gallerist and art dealer Max Wigram (b. 1966) in July 2004. Together they have three children. Their eldest and only daughter, Maya Wigram, is a model and notably closed Burberry's AW24 runway show during London Fashion Week, which led The New York Times to label her a "nepo baby" due to her mother's fashion world connections. Philo and Wigram also have two younger sons.
