= Ruslan Baginskiy =

Fashion designer

Ruslan Bahinskyi
- Руслан Багінський
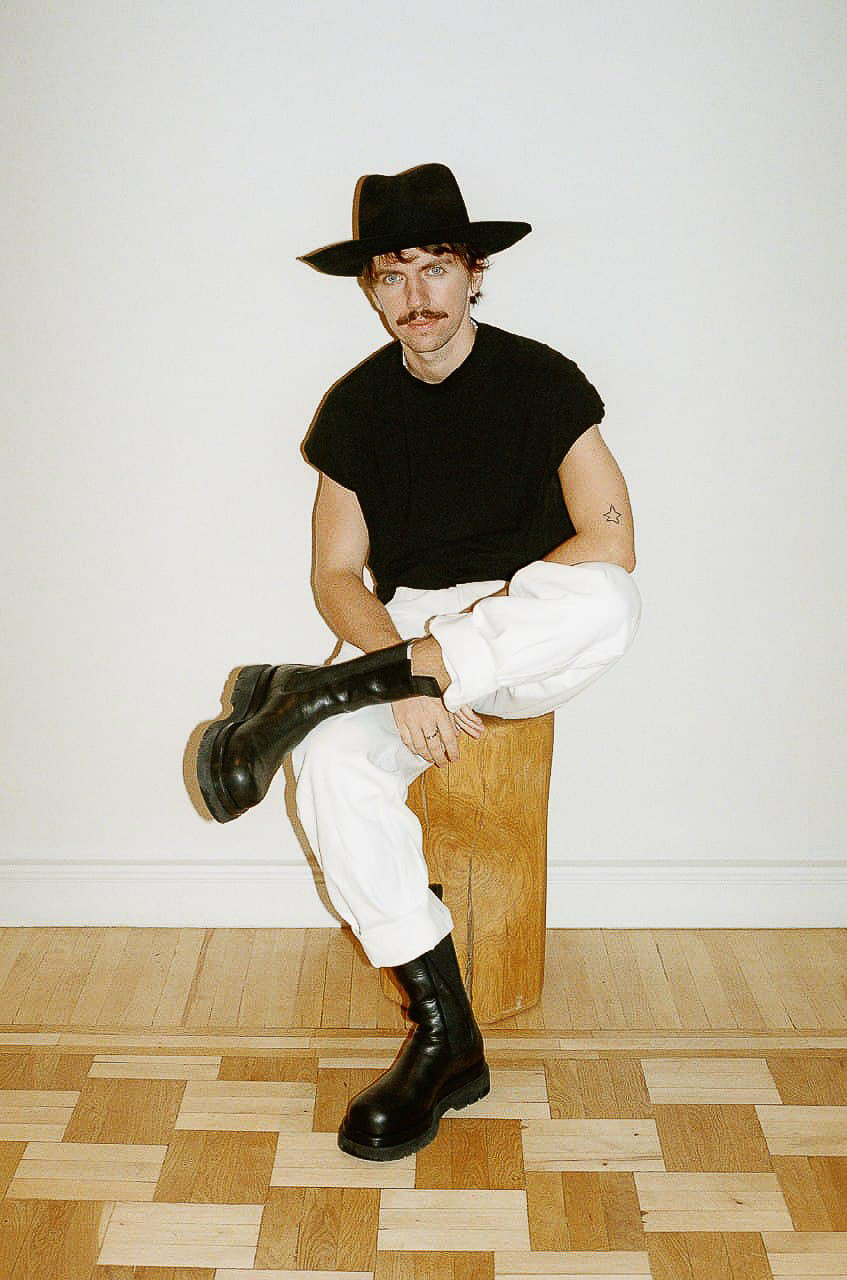
- Born: 5 September 1989 (age 36); Lviv, Ukraine
- Education: Ivan Franko National University of Lviv
- Occupation: Fashion designer
- Label: Ruslan Baginskiy
- Awards: Best Fashion Awards, Best Breakthrough of the Year, ANDAM Fashion Awards (2023)
- Website: https://ruslanbaginskiy.com/

Ruslan Volodymyrovych Baginskiy (Ukrainian: Руслан Володимирович Багінський; born 5 September 1989) is a Ukrainian headwear and accessory designer and founder of the eponymous Ruslan Baginskiy brand. He is based in Kyiv, Ukraine.

== Early life and career ==
Ruslan was born on 5 September 1989 in Lviv, Ukraine. He studied at the Faculty of Geography of the Ivan Franko National University of Lviv. At the age of 20 Baginskiy started to work as a stylist for shoots and shows of Ukrainian designers. In 2011, Ruslan made his first head piece for a fashion shoot. He soon became fascinated with the world of headwear, learning from the experience of local milliners and interning at a Lviv atelier.

== Ruslan Baginskiy brand ==
=== 2015–2021 ===
In 2015, Ruslan Baginskiy started his own headwear and accessory brand. The first collection was inspired by head pieces of the XX century, reimagined in a modern way. In 2017, Ruslan moved from Lviv to Kyiv and opened his first showroom. Later on, Ruslan's mother, father and brother also moved to Kyiv, becoming part of the RB team. Ruslan Baginskiy creates one couture collection and four seasonal collections per year. The brand is available on Browns, Matchesfashion, Mytheresa, Luisaviaroma, Moda Operandi and Revolve, in Harrods, Holt Renfrew, Dover Street Market, Harvey Nichols and Lane Crawford. The complete list of stockists and online-retailers can be found on the brand's website.

2016 — First articles about the brand appeared in Harper's Bazaar UA, Elle UA, L'Officiel Homme UA and Harper's Bazaar Russia. The baker boy cap was presented, which is now a signature piece, worn by Bella and Gigi Hadid, Kaia Gerber, Rosie Huntington-Whiteley, Chiara Ferragni and other celebrities.

2017 — First presentation at Ukrainian Fashion Week.

2018 — Ruslan Baginskiy created a personalized hat for Madonna specially for the Vogue Italia August issue cover story. From then on, Madonna supports the brand and is the muse of the designer. In the same year, Ruslan Baginskiy presented a collaboration with the American brand RTA.

2019 — Ruslan Baginskiy created an exclusive product for the largest Italian retailer Luisaviaroma. On 1 July, the brand presented the first couture collection "Stozhary" (Ukrainian: Стожари). The presentation at Hôtel de Crillon in Paris was attended by Nicky Hilton Rothschild, Sofia Sanchez de Betak and Karla Otto. The presentation setup was completed with the sculptures of Ukrainian artist Maria Kulikovska and the invitation was created by Nikolay Tolmachev.

2020 — The New York Times published an article about Ruslan Baginskiy. Ukraine's first lady Olena Zelenska attended an audience with Pope Francis, wearing a Ruslan Baginskiy piece. Rosé and Lisa from K-pop group Blackpink wore Ruslan Baginskiy accessories in the music video for "Ice Cream", featuring Selena Gomez. The brand presented its second couture collection named "TSVIT". Due to the pandemic, the presentation was carried out online, through the medium of the art project in collaboration with Ukrainian duo of photographers Synchrodogs and stylist Julie Pelipas. The Instagram mask with a couture headpiece was tried on by Tina Kunakey, Camila Coelho, Nicky Hilton and Kat Graham.

2021 — V from the South Korean group BTS wore the RB Straw Boater Hat for the "Butter" video. The brand released a photo project with Los Angeles-based photographer Henrik Purienne. In July, the first Ruslan Baginskiy pop-up store was opened in the Parisian indie store Paradise Garage Store.

=== 2022 ===
Following the Russian invasion of Ukraine on 24 February 2022, the brand relocated all staff and equipment to Lviv. Ruslan Baginskiy showed support for Ukrainian defense efforts, organizing a large-scale charity drop of hand-embroidered baseball caps and initiating public campaigns in support of Ukraine with celebrities and influencers.

In May 2022, Ruslan Baginskiy opened a new store in Lviv. In July, the brand collaborated with Italian retailer Luisa Via Roma in Florence, creating large-scale window displays and a pop-up space.

In August 2022, a specially crafted Ruslan Baginskiy hat was officially accepted by Her Majesty Queen Elizabeth II, one of the last pieces received by the Queen in her lifetime.

In December 2022, the brand opened a pop-up store in the Carpathian Mountains of Ukraine entitled "Here and Now". The same year, the brand was prominently featured in season 2 of HBO's The White Lotus.

=== 2023 ===
In May 2023, Ruslan Baginskiy crafted a special jewelry brooch named "Yevshan Zillya" (Ukrainian: Євшан-Зілля, meaning "Wormwood"), which Ukraine's First Lady Olena Zelenska wore to the coronation of Charles III and Camilla.

The same month, the brand created custom hats for all 56 shows of Beyoncé's Renaissance World Tour.

In June 2023, Ruslan Baginskiy won the ANDAM Fashion Awards in the Accessory Category; the grand prize went to Louis-Gabriel Nouchi.

In September 2023, the brand launched its first jewelry collection, SKARBY:TREASURES.

In October 2023, Ruslan Baginskiy crafted hats for Madonna's The Celebration Tour.

In December 2023, the brand opened a new store in Odesa, Ukraine. The same month, Ruslan Baginskiy received recognition from the Ministry of Foreign Affairs of Ukraine as "Honorary Ambassador 2023: Ukrainian Brand".

=== 2024 ===
In 2024, Ruslan Baginskiy launched GRAIN DE SEL, the brand's first hand-blown scented candle, created in collaboration with Ukrainian glass-blowers.

In April 2024, two bespoke, handcrafted Ruslan Baginskiy hats were presented on behalf of Her Majesty Queen Camilla and Her Royal Highness The Princess of Wales by Nicolas Harrocks, Deputy Head of Mission at the British Embassy in Kyiv.

In May 2024, Ruslan Baginskiy pieces appeared on The Tonight Show Starring Jimmy Fallon.

In June 2024, the brand launched its first transformer accessory, the RB HatBag—a patented design that can be worn as a hat or as a bag. The same month, Ruslan Baginskiy was featured at Vogue WorldVogue (magazine) 2024 in Paris, showcasing straw RB Hay Bags.

In July 2024, the brand's RB Houstka Headscarf was featured in Rihanna's campaign for Fenty Beauty. Later that month, Ruslan Baginskiy launched a project honoring Ukrainian sculptor Mykhailo Dzyndra, highlighting the dialogue between the designer and the artist's work.

In August 2024, the brand was featured in season 4 of Netflix's Emily in Paris, episodes 1, 3, and 4.

In September 2024, the brand opened its first curated space, "Artisanal Journey", in Kyiv during Ukrainian Fashion Week, dedicated to Ukrainian artistry and craft.

In October 2024, three Ruslan Baginskiy pieces were chosen to enter the National Archive of the Musée des Arts Décoratifs in Paris.

=== 2025 ===
2025 marks the 10th anniversary of the Ruslan Baginskiy brand.

In June 2025, Beyoncé's Cowboy Carter Tour opening act featured RB golden cowboy hats, as well as a custom hat for Blue Ivy.

In July 2025, the brand achieved a major milestone with a takeover of the historic French department store Galeries Lafayette in Paris. Twelve detailed windows completely crafted and curated by the Ukrainian brand were accompanied by the opening of an RB pop-up space and shop-in-shop at Galeries Lafayette.

In September 2025, the brand opened its flagship store in the centre of Warsaw, Poland.

To celebrate the 10-year anniversary, Ruslan Baginskiy organised an anniversary dinner on the banks of the Dnipro River in Kyiv.

Throughout 2025, Ruslan Baginskiy hats were seen across several major world tours, including G-Dragon's Übermensch World Tour, Ateez 2025 World Tour [In Your Fantasy], Addison Rae's The Addison Tour, and Tate McRae's Miss Possessive Tour.
