= Sonya Monina =

Ukrainian fashion designer (born 1988)

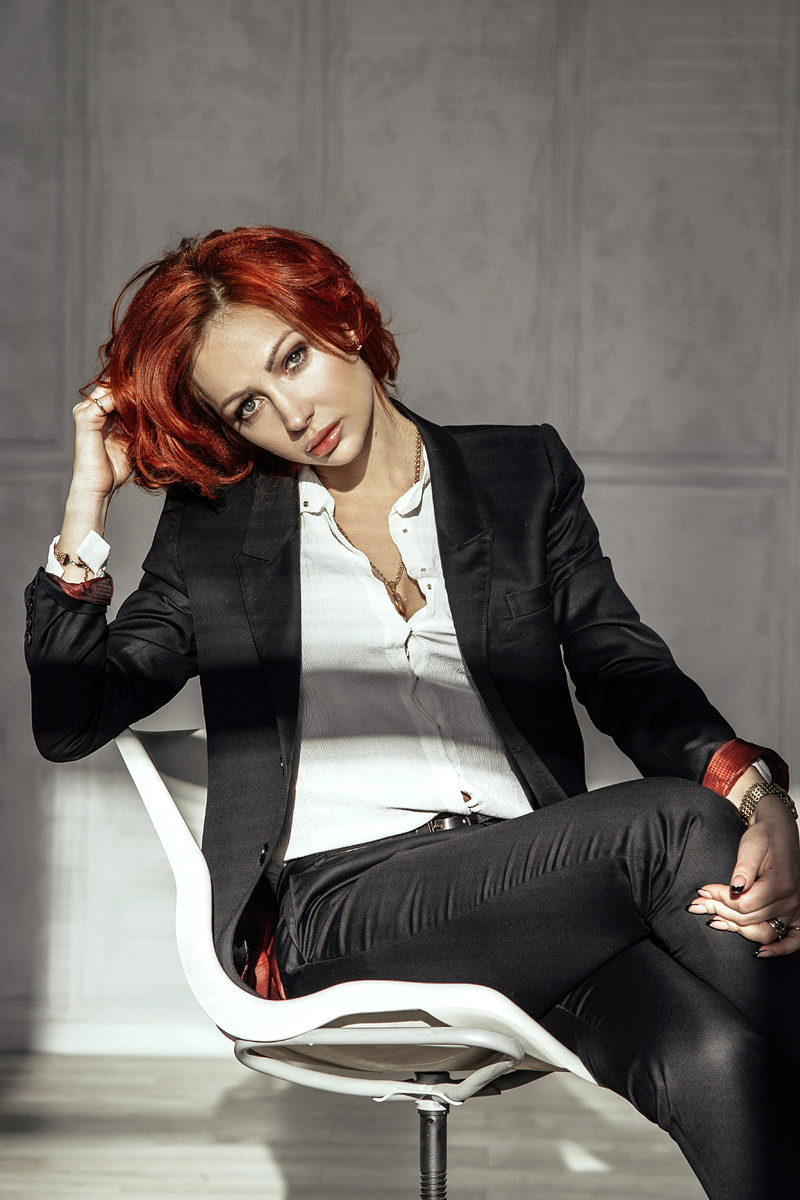
- Born: Olha Heorhiieva; December 29, 1988 (age 37)
- Education: Kyiv National University of Technologies and Design
- Occupation: Fashion designer
- Years active: 2012–present
- Label: SONYAMONINA

Olha Heorhiieva, known professionally as Sonya Monina (Ukrainian: Соня Моніна; born December 29, 1988, in Brest, Byelorussian SSR) is a Ukrainian fashion and custom designer. She is founder of SONYAMONINA, a menswear brand based in Kyiv. Her collections have been featured in Ukraine, Belarus, Russia and Slovakia. Her designs are regularly featured during Ukrainian Fashion Week.

== Background ==
Olha Heorhiieva was born on December 29, 1988, in Brest. At the age of 5, she moved to Simferopol with her family. In 2006, she started studying "Design of leather goods" at Kyiv National University of Technologies and Design. In 2012, she created her own menswear clothing brand, SONYAMONINA. In 2013, Monina presented her debut collection within the Ukrainian Fashion Week. In 2015, she presented her collection of the spring/summer 2016 within Belarus Fashion Week. In 2016, She presented her collections at the "Festival of Young Fashion Designers" in Moscow. In 2018, she presented her collection of the summer 2019 at Mystetskyi Arsenal National Art and Culture Museum Complex within Ukrainian Fashion Week. She was nominated for "Best men’s clothing designer award" at the Best Fashion Awards 2019 in Ukraine.
Monina is also a custom designer. Celebrity clients she has worked with have included Oskar Kuchera, Vitalii Kozlovskyi, Kishe, Pierre Narcisse, Anton Zatsepin and Oleksandr Motornyi, among others.
