= History of sculpture in Ukraine =

Ukrainian sculpture is the sculpture created on the territory of modern Ukraine and by Ukrainian sculptors abroad, from pre‑historic times to the present day. It encompasses a wide range of forms, from early ritual and folk objects to monumental public works, architectural decoration, funerary sculpture, small plastic and contemporary conceptual projects.

The development of sculpture in Ukraine has been shaped by the country’s complex political and cultural history, including ancient steppe cultures, Kyivan Rus', the Grand Duchy of Lithuania and the Polish–Lithuanian Commonwealth, the Cossack Hetmanate, and the Russian and Habsburg Empires. In the 20th century, Ukrainian sculpture was deeply affected by Soviet cultural policy, war, political repression and emigration, while the period since 1991 has seen growing integration into international artistic networks and renewed attention to public space and historical memory.

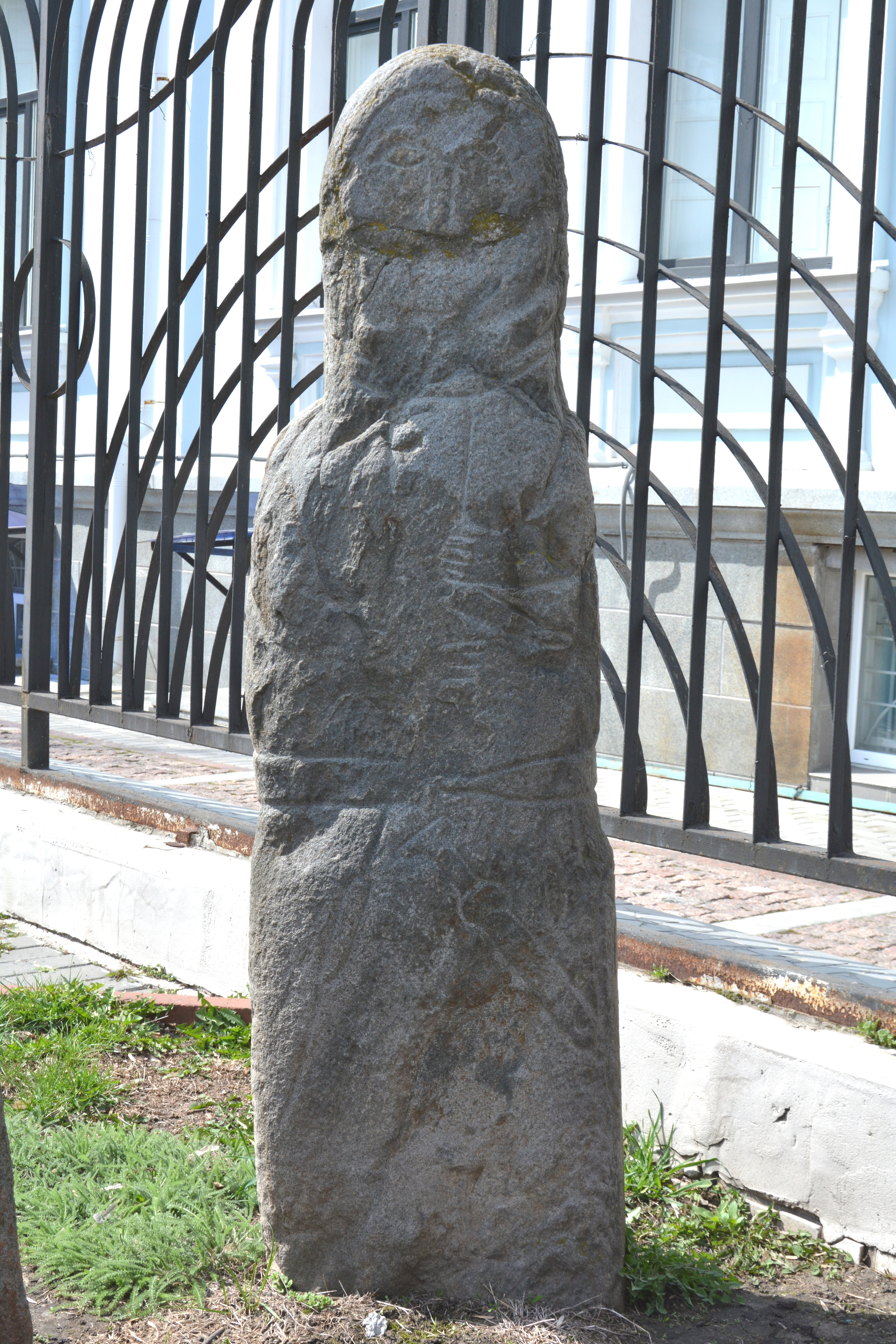
Stone statue in the lapidarium of the Kropyvnytskyi Regional Museum of Local History

== Early sculpture ==
=== Prehistoric and ancient cultures ===
The earliest sculptural objects found on the territory of Ukraine date back to the Palaeolithic and Neolithic periods, including small figurines of humans and animals made from stone, bone and clay associated with ritual and everyday life of hunter‑gatherer and early agricultural communities. A distinctive phenomenon of the steppe zone are the so‑called stone babas (anthropomorphic stone stelae), created by nomadic peoples such as the Polovtsians from the 9th to the 13th centuries and erected on burial sites and along routes.

In the Black Sea region, ancient Greek colonies such as Tyras, Olbia, Chersonesus and Panticapaeum produced sculpture in the traditions of classical Greek art, including architectural fragments, reliefs, votive stelae and small plastic works. Many of these items are preserved in the National Museum of the History of Ukraine, the National Art Museum of Ukraine and regional museums.

=== Kyivan Rus' ===
In the period of Kyivan Rus' (9th–13th centuries), sculpture developed primarily in the context of architecture and religious art, following the adoption of Christianity in 988 and close contacts with Byzantium. Church building in stone brought with it carved capitals, friezes, window surrounds and ornamental reliefs, examples of which survive in Kyiv, Chernihiv and other centres.

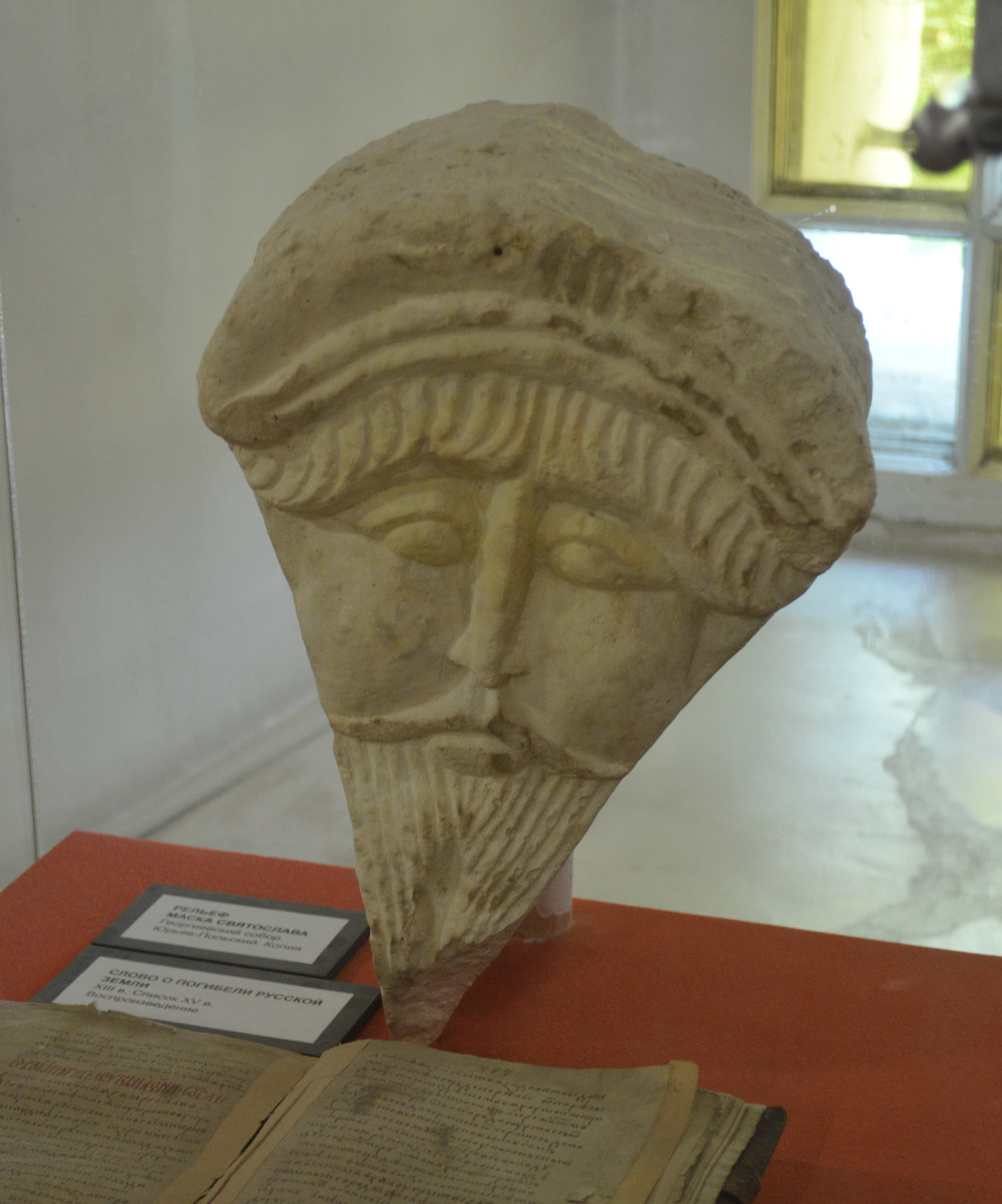
Relief with the figure of Sviatoslav, an example of medieval sculptural decoration associated with the culture of Kyivan Rus'

Small sculptural objects of Kyivan Rus' include carved crosses, icon frames and liturgical items in stone, bone and metal. Freestanding sculpture in the round was not widely developed due to religious reservations regarding three‑dimensional images in Orthodox church interiors and the centrality of icon painting.

== Sculpture in the late Middle Ages and early modern period ==
=== Grand Duchy of Lithuania and Polish–Lithuanian Commonwealth ===
From the 14th century, central and western Ukrainian lands were incorporated into the Grand Duchy of Lithuania and later the Polish–Lithuanian Commonwealth. In this period, sculpture developed mostly within ecclesiastical and funerary contexts, under strong influence from Gothic and early Renaissance forms coming from Central Europe.

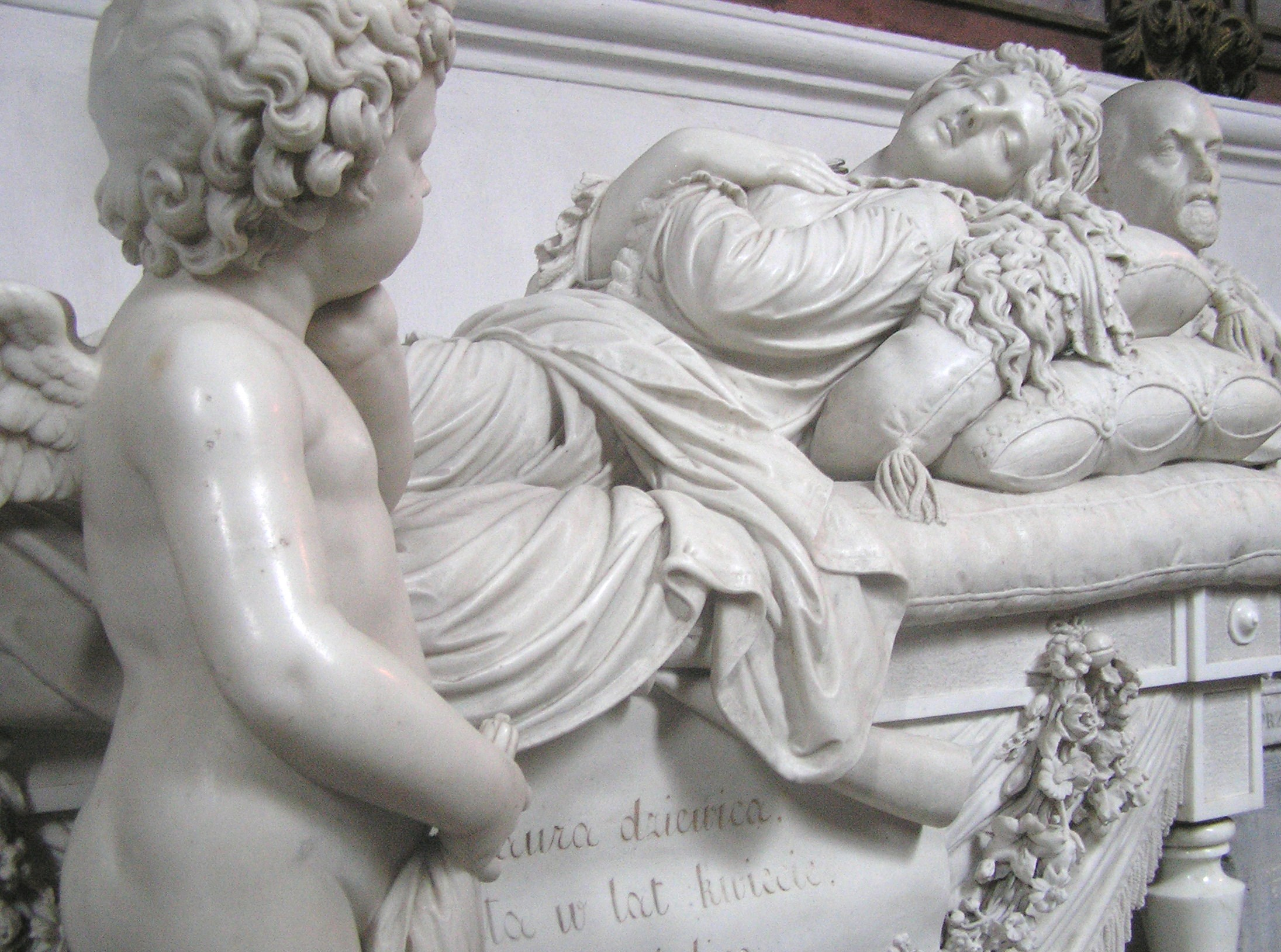
Marble tomb monument to Laura Przeździecka by Wiktor Brodzki (1870s), an example of Catholic funerary sculpture in the region of Kamianets-Podilskyi

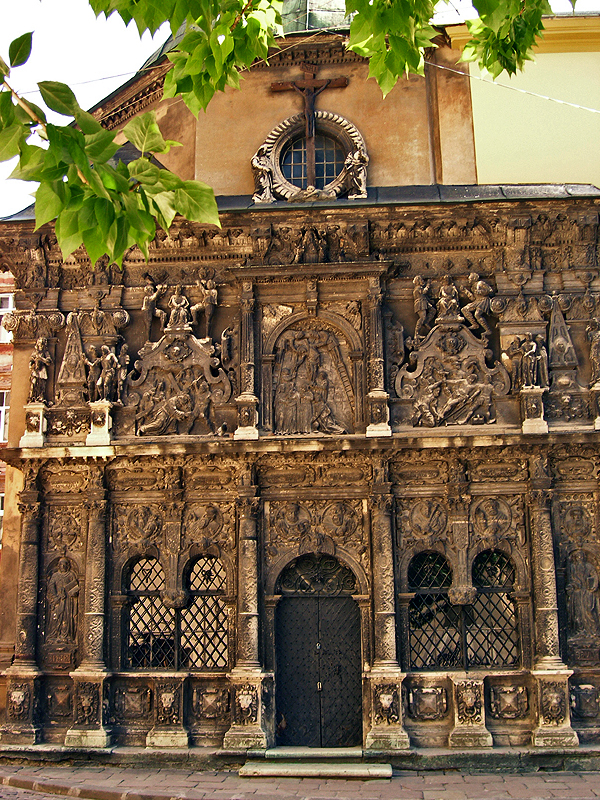
Boim Chapel in Lviv, a richly sculpted Renaissance funerary chapel

Gothic stone tomb slabs and effigies appeared in cathedrals and churches in cities such as Lviv, Kamianets-Podilskyi and Lutsk, combining local heraldic motifs with European stylistic models. Carved wooden altars and polychrome sculptures became more widespread in Catholic churches, while Orthodox churches retained a more limited programme of relief and decorative carving.

=== Cossack Hetmanate and Baroque ===
The 17th and 18th centuries saw the flourishing of the Cossack Hetmanate and the spread of the so‑called Ukrainian Baroque in architecture and the arts, including sculpture. Baroque iconostases in Ukrainian churches incorporated carved wooden reliefs and sculptural elements with dynamic forms and rich ornamentation, especially in centres such as Kyiv, Chernihiv and Pochaiv.

Funerary sculpture in this period includes stone and marble tombs of nobles, clergy and Cossack officers, typically combining portrait effigies or coats of arms with elaborate ornamental frames. In western regions, workshops in Lviv developed complex sculptural decoration for church façades under the influence of Western European Baroque.

== Sculpture in the 19th century ==
=== Academic and salon sculpture ===
In the 19th century Ukrainian territories were divided between the Russian Empire and the Austro‑Hungarian Empire, which shaped institutional frameworks for the arts. Many Ukrainian sculptors studied at imperial academies in Saint Petersburg, Vienna, Kraków or Prague and worked within the norms of academic and salon sculpture, producing portrait busts and statues, allegorical compositions, architectural sculpture and public monuments.

Among early notable figures were Leonid Pozen, active in Poltava and Saint Petersburg, and Parashkev Levytskyi in Lviv, who created portrait and funerary sculpture for local clients. Their work combined academic training with interest in local themes and personalities.

=== National revival and public monuments ===
The second half of the 19th century witnessed the rise of modern Ukrainian national consciousness, and sculpture played a role through monuments to historical and literary figures. Projects to commemorate Taras Shevchenko and Cossack leaders were initiated in different regions, though many faced political obstacles under imperial rule.

In the western lands under Habsburg rule, sculptors such as Antin Popel and Luka Dmytryk worked in Lviv and other cities, creating tombs and sculptures for Ukrainian and Polish patrons and contributing to the urban fabric of multi‑ethnic Galicia.

== Sculpture in the first half of the 20th century ==
=== Early modernism and avant‑garde ===
In the early 20th century Ukrainian sculpture absorbed influences from European modernism and the avant‑garde, as artists experimented with simplified volumes, expressive forms and new materials. One of the most significant figures was Oleksandr Arkhypenko, who developed a radically new sculptural language that combined cubist fragmentation with an interest in voids and negative space and became an important representative of the international avant‑garde.

Another key sculptor was Ivan Kavaleridze, whose early work integrated elements of cubism into monumental public sculpture in Ukraine before he was compelled to conform to socialist realism. Kavaleridze is known for early monuments to Taras Shevchenko and to Bolshevik politician Artem, as well as for his work as a film director.

During the revolutionary and early Soviet period, discussions about “monumental propaganda” opened opportunities for experimentation with new forms of public sculpture, though these were soon curtailed by ideological control. Some sculptors participated in broader avant‑garde networks in Kyiv, Kharkiv, Odesa and Lviv, collaborating with painters, architects and theatre practitioners.

=== Interwar period in Western Ukraine ===
In the interwar period, Western Ukrainian territories (notably Eastern Galicia with Lviv) were part of the Second Polish Republic, and local sculptors operated in a multi‑ethnic environment while engaging with Ukrainian cultural institutions and church structures. Artists such as Serhii Lytvynenko and Mykhailo Brynskyi created monuments and tombs that contributed to the visualisation of Ukrainian identity under Polish rule.

Western Ukrainian sculpture of this time combined elements of late academicism, art deco and modernism, and included numerous works for Greek‑Catholic churches as well as public commemorative monuments.

== Sculpture in the Soviet period ==
=== 1920s–1930s: experiment and repression ===
In Soviet Ukraine, the 1920s were marked by debates about the role of monumental art in the new socialist society and by projects for “monumental propaganda”, which encouraged some sculptors to seek new forms and themes. Ivan Kavaleridze’s early monuments, which integrated cubist treatment of form, are often cited as rare examples of avant‑garde public sculpture of this period in Ukraine.

From the early 1930s, the imposition of socialist realism as the official style and the tightening of ideological control dramatically narrowed the range of acceptable sculptural practices, and several artists faced repression or marginalisation.

=== Post‑war monumental sculpture ===
After the Second World War, Soviet Ukrainian sculpture was dominated by monumental public works commemorating the “Great Patriotic War”, revolutionary leaders and Soviet achievements. Major cities received large‑scale statues and memorial ensembles, often executed by teams of sculptors and architects such as Vasyl Borodai and Mykhailo Lysenko.

At the same time, some sculptors pursued more personal or experimental directions in chamber formats, including Valentyn Zankovskyi and Halyna Kalchenko, though opportunities to exhibit such work were limited by institutional constraints.

Motherland Monument in Kyiv, an example of late Soviet monumental sculpture

== Ukrainian sculpture in emigration ==
Throughout the 20th century, waves of political emigration created a Ukrainian artistic diaspora in Europe, North and South America and elsewhere, and sculptors abroad combined elements of Ukrainian tradition with international modernist languages. The most prominent emigrant sculptor was Oleksandr Arkhypenko, who settled in Western Europe and later in the United States and became recognised as one of the pioneers of modern sculpture.

Another important figure was Mykhailo Dzyndra, who left Ukraine in 1944, lived in Germany and the United States and developed a distinctive abstract sculptural style that broke with academic canons. Dzyndra created hundreds of sculptures, more than 800 of which he brought back to Ukraine in the 1990s and installed in a self‑built Museum of Modern Sculpture near Lviv, now part of the Borys Voznytskyi Lviv National Art Gallery.

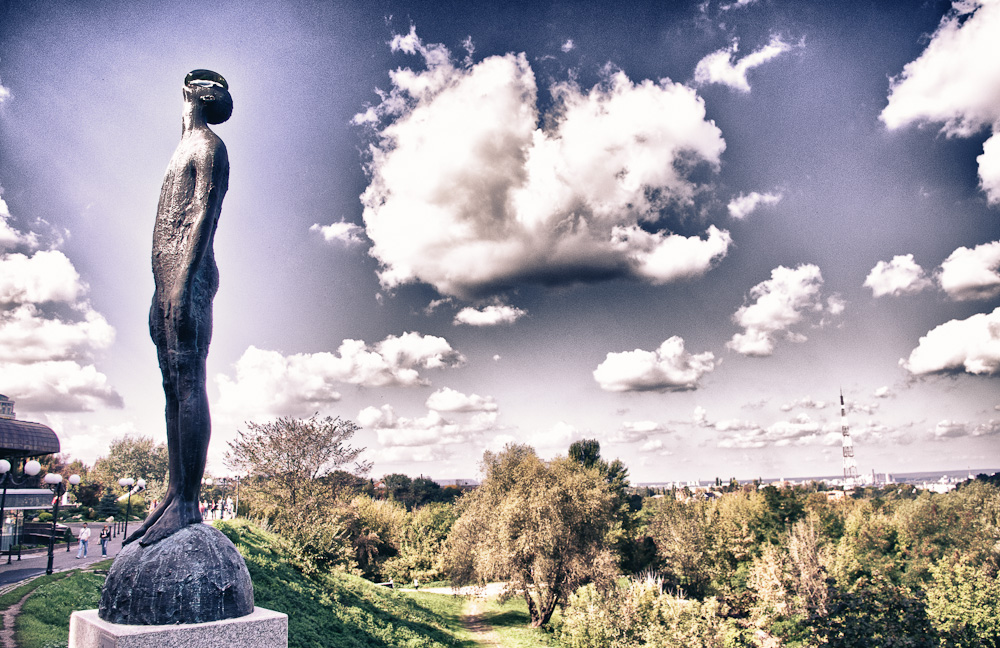
Nazar Bilyk’s sculpture Rain in Kyiv

Diaspora sculptors also produced public monuments for Ukrainian communities abroad, including numerous monuments to Taras Shevchenko in North America and Europe. These works contributed to the preservation and development of Ukrainian sculptural traditions outside the Soviet and post‑Soviet space.

== Contemporary Ukrainian sculpture ==
=== Independence period ===
Since Ukrainian independence in 1991, conditions for artistic production have changed significantly, and sculptors have worked in an increasingly diverse media landscape, incorporating installation, land art, public interventions, new materials and technologies alongside traditional forms. Contemporary Ukrainian sculpture engages with questions of historical memory, identity, urban space and social conflict and responds to political events such as the Orange Revolution, the Revolution of Dignity and Russian aggression against Ukraine.

Prominent sculptors of the late 20th and early 21st century include Nazar Bilyk, Oleh Pinchuk and others, who have realised both public monuments and independent projects in Ukraine and abroad. In Lviv, the legacy of sculptors such as Yevhen Dzyndra, who created architectural sculpture for the city’s railway station, connects earlier decorative practice with contemporary understandings of urban heritage.

Ukrainian sculptors participate in international biennials, residencies and exhibitions, integrating local concerns into global artistic discourse. At the same time, debates continue about the future of Soviet monumental heritage, which includes works by Ivan Kavaleridze, Vasyl Borodai, Mykhailo Lysenko and many others and is increasingly threatened by neglect, war damage and politically motivated removal.

== See also ==
- Ukrainian art
- Ukrainian architecture
