= Solange Franklin Reed =

American fashion stylist

- Born: Solange Franklin
- Education: Mount Holyoke College (BA)
- Occupations: Stylist, editor
- Years active: 2015–present
- Known for: Fashion styling
- Spouse: Brian Franklin Reed
- Children: 1
- Website: solangefranklin.com

Solange Franklin Reed (née Franklin) is an American fashion stylist. Since 2015, she has worked as an independent stylist, with a portfolio that includes editorial, runway, and celebrity styling. Franklin Reed was recognized as one of the inaugural New Wave: Creatives at the 2019 Fashion Awards.

== Early life and education ==
Born Solange Franklin, she was raised in Des Moines, Iowa. Both of her parents are physicians. From a young age, Franklin had a passion for fashion and frequently read magazines such as Honey. She cited Missy Elliott, Lauryn Hill, and Aaliyah as early fashion inspirations. Franklin enjoyed shopping at thrift stores and often borrowed clothing from her older sister's closet. An avid reader of fashion blogs, she found them to be a catalyst for considering a career in the industry.

Franklin attended Mount Holyoke College, initially enrolling as a pre-med student. She later created her own major in race, gender, and health relations before eventually switching to African American studies. During college, she interned in the marketing department at Teen Vogue.

== Career ==
Franklin Reed's fashion career began with an internship at Essence. She then secured a salaried position at Teen Vogue. She transitioned into freelance work, assisting various stylists. For over four years, Franklin Reed served as the first assistant to fashion editor Giovanna Battaglia, whom she considers a mentor. She also worked as an editor-at-large for Paper.

Since 2015, Franklin Reed has worked as an independent stylist, with her portfolio including editorials, runway styling, advertising, and celebrity styling. She places a strong emphasis on representing creatives who are Black, women, curvy, and from other underrepresented communities.

Franklin Reed has worked with high-profile clients such as Serena Williams, Whoopi Goldberg, Solange Knowles, Tracee Ellis Ross, Zazie Beetz, and Kerry Washington. Her work has been highlighted by publications such as Pause and Editorialist.

In 2024 she styled the actresses on the cover of Essence's December/January issue. She also styled Denée Benton and Victoria Mon ét.

=== Other work ===
She was a speaker at the 2017 Women's March in New York City. After styling the first troop of homeless Girl Scouts for Teen Vogue, Franklin Reed became a troop leader herself.

=== Artistry ===
Franklin Reed named Eartha Kitt and Simone Leigh as two inspirations for her work as a stylist. She described herself as tactile with her work, and as someone who seeks to be "bold" and "expansive." She encourages her clients to push themselves by 10% with their style choices.

== Personal life ==
She married journalist Brian Reed, host of S-Town, in October 2015. They met through a mutual friend. The couple legally changed their last name to "Franklin Reed" after appearing in court to secure the right to do so without hyphenating or merging their names.

They reside in Brooklyn, New York, and have one child (born 2021).

== Accolades ==
- 2019 – The Fashion Awards, The New Wave: Creatives, British Fashion Council
