= Onuch =

Onuch (Ukrainian: Онух) is a Ukrainian family name. Notable people with the name include:

- Jerzy Onuch (born 1954), Polish-Canadian artist and curator
- Olga Onuch, political scientist

== See also ==
- Onuchin
