= LONDI (brand) =

Ukrainian clothing brand

- Type: Private
- Industry: Fashion, Lingerie, Loungewear
- Founded: 2022; 4 years ago
- Founder: Yulkka Vozniak
- Headquarters: Ukraine
- Products: Lingerie, loungewear, bodywear, accessories
- Website: londi.com

LONDI is a Ukrainian designer loungewear and lingerie brand founded in 2022 by Yulkka Vozniak (Юлкка Возняк). The company designs garments using natural fibers, combining elements of traditional lingerie with ready-to-wear apparel. LONDI operates a production facility in the Vinnytsia Oblast and retails through its own stores in Ukraine and stockists in Europe and Asia.

== History ==
The brand originated in 2019 as an online sunglasses store founded by Vozniak. In late 2021, the business pivoted to lingerie under the name Vidchutia (Відчуття, meaning "Feelings"). Production launched in November 2022 during widespread power outages caused by the Russian invasion of Ukraine.

In 2023, the brand rebranded to LONDI to facilitate international expansion. The company reported monthly revenue of up to 5 million UAH by the end of 2023, with total investment exceeding $330,000.

LONDI was included in the Forbes Ukraine Next 250 list of promising Ukrainian businesses in 2025. In October 2025, the company acquired Archive Place, a Ukrainian jewelry and accessories brand, as part of its expansion under the parent group SoProject.

== Design and philosophy ==
LONDI's collections are positioned at the intersection of lingerie and everyday apparel, featuring designs intended to be worn beyond the private sphere. The brand draws inspiration from natural elements, reflected in its color palette, textures, and fabric choices. Early collections introduced design elements including soft cuts, sculptural seams, and wave-inspired lines applied to classic silhouettes.

The brand offers sizing from XS to 2XL. In February 2024, LONDI launched a gender-neutral collection. In February 2026, the brand released a capsule collection titled "Swan in Heart" in collaboration with Ukrainian artist Iryna Maksymova, featuring hand-painted motifs on lingerie pieces.

== Production ==
LONDI manufactures its products at its own facility in the Vinnytsia Oblast, employing approximately 25 workers including 12 seamstresses. The brand reports that approximately 95% of its fabrics are natural fibers and that around 70% of items are produced on a made-to-order basis to reduce overproduction. The company states that it adheres to ISO ethical standards in production and incorporates upcycling practices by repurposing fabric offcuts.

== Media coverage ==
LONDI has been featured in Vogue editions in France, Italy, and the Czech Republic, as well as in Hypebae, Forbes Ukraine, Harper's Bazaar Ukraine, Elle Ukraine, Cosmopolitan Ukraine, Marie Claire Ukraine, and Italian art publication Artribune.

The brand was featured at the 55th Ukrainian Fashion Week in 2024.

== Retail and distribution ==
LONDI operates ten retail locations in Ukraine, including a presence in TSUM Kyiv. Internationally, the brand is stocked in multi-brand retailers including Persei in Barcelona, AJ13 in Lisbon, Items 3e in Paris, Katsurina Studio in Warsaw, Ruta in Bali, and Stunning Lure in Japan.
