= Gunia Project =

Ukrainian fashion and design brand

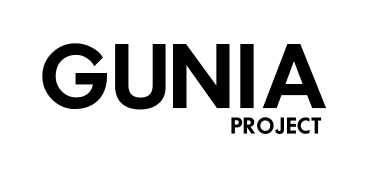
- Gunia Project logo
- Type: Private company
- Industry: Fashion
- Founded: 2019
- Founders: Nataliia Kamenska; Maria Gavryliuk
- Headquarters: Kyiv, Ukraine
- Products: Clothing; accessories; home decor; jewellery
- Website: guniaproject.com

Gunia Project is a Ukrainian fashion and design brand based in Kyiv, founded by Nataliia Kamenska and Maria Gavryliuk. It produces ceramics, glass, homeware, textiles, jewellery and accessories, working with Ukrainian artisans.

== Name ==
The name comes from the hunya (gunia), a woollen coat traditionally made in the Carpathians. Recreating it was the founders' first product, and it gave the brand its name.

== History ==
Kamenska and Gavryliuk met while working in fashion; Kamenska had co-founded the label Lake Studio and Gavryliuk worked as an art director and illustrator. Sources date the start of the project differently: Vogue Ukraine places it in 2016, when the first gunias were made, and says Gavryliuk joined a year later, while Vogue gives 2017 as the launch. In 2019 Gunia Project was formally established as a brand with a permanent team, and its first full collection — ceramics, blown glass and scarves — was released in February of that year.

Early products included silk scarves based on eighteenth-century rushnyky from the collection of the Ivan Honchar Museum; the brand's range later also included vytynanka-style collars. Vogue Polska has described the brand's work as drawing on museum collections and on cooperation with craftspeople across Ukraine.

In 2021 Gavryliuk was included in the Forbes Ukraine "30 Under 30" list. The same profile notes that in 2020 a set of Gunia Project tableware was presented to Pope Francis.

In July 2022, on her arrival in the United States, Ukraine's First Lady Olena Zelenska wore a pin produced by the jewellery label Guzema in collaboration with Gunia Project. In December 2023 she wore a Gunia Project brooch in the shape of a dove, a motif taken from the decoration of Ukrainian ceremonial bread, at a meeting on the national mental health programme.

In 2023 the brand was the subject of a business profile in Forbes Ukraine as part of the magazine's Next250 listing of small and medium-sized Ukrainian companies.

In 2024 the brand made a ceramic look for the Vogue Ukraine Showcase. It was presented within the official Paris Fashion Week schedule and later appeared on the cover of the summer print issue of Vogue Ukraine.

The brand opened a shop on Antonovycha Street in Kyiv in 2021, and in 2025 a second Kyiv showroom at 2-A Zolotovoritska Street, in a building that had previously housed the Embassy of Panama.

== Collections ==
The Indigo capsule of October 2020 was built around a single colour and combined ornaments from Ukrainian carpets with Asian motifs; it included ceramics and silk scarves. Atlantes, presented in May 2022, took as its starting point the atlantes of the Kozerovsky House on Kostelna Street in Kyiv, and comprised earrings, a brooch, blown-glass vases, a ceramic candle and silk scarves. Freedom, available from the end of May 2022, was devoted to life, freedom and Ukraine's victory, and included ceramics, jewellery and knitted belts.

The autumn–winter collection Korovai reinterpreted Ukrainian wedding traditions, among them the viltsia and the ceremonial loaf, in embroidered garments and beaded jewellery. Viltsia, named after the viltse, the small decorated tree used in Ukrainian wedding rites, was shown at Ukrainian Fashion Week in September 2024 inside the Golden Gate in Kyiv, in a staged presentation with live choral singing; the garments were made as one-offs and sold as individual pieces. The Christmas collection Dyvosvit, presented in November 2024, drew on museum objects and traditional house painting, and covered clothing, jewellery, ceramics and decorations.

In August 2023 the brand released a gilded silver pendant in the shape of a heart with arrows, based on Cossack heraldic motifs and taking its name from the proverb "the heart has a will of its own". In June 2024, together with the Ministry of Culture and Information Policy and the Treasury of the National Museum of the History of Ukraine, it presented Scythian Gold, a charity jewellery piece based on nomadic artefacts.
