= Kate Davidson Hudson =

American fashion magazine editor

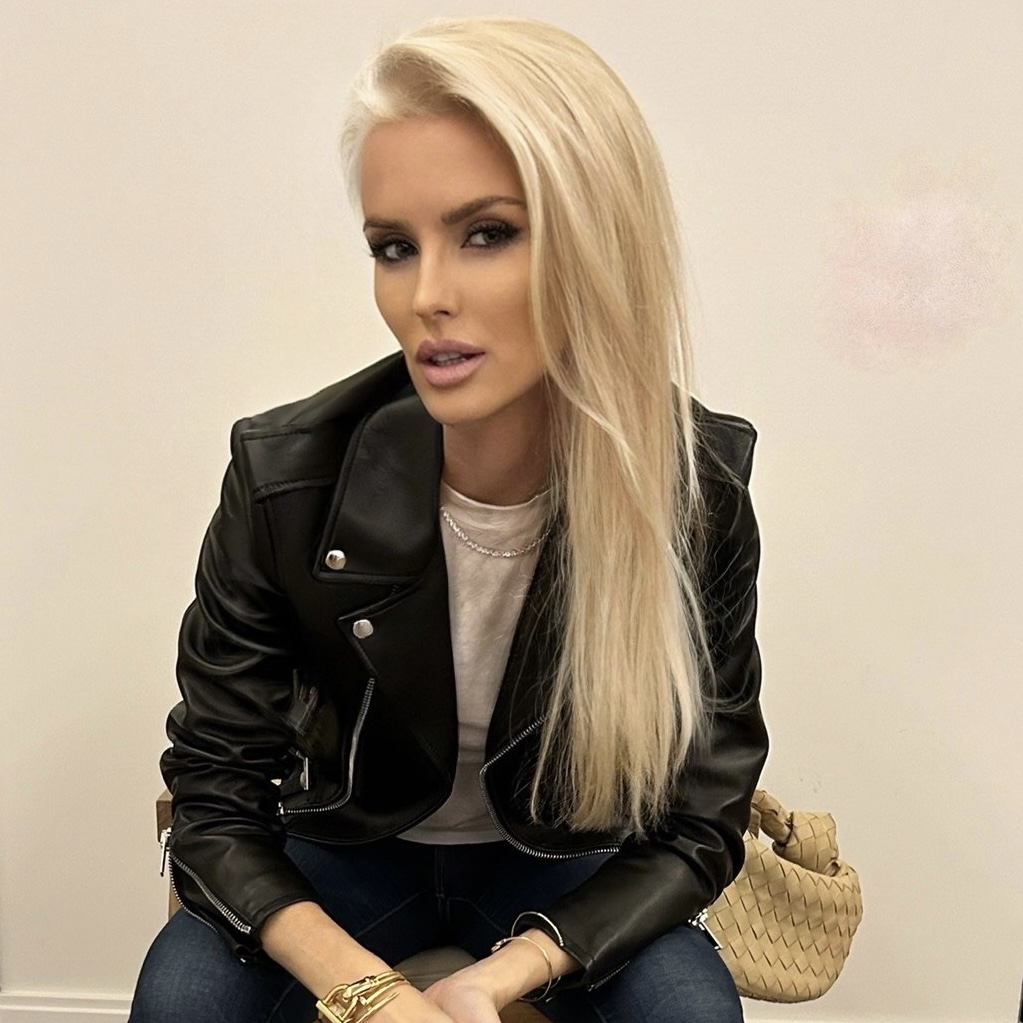
- Born: Kate Davidson
- Occupations: Fashion Journalist, Media entrepreneur, Magazine editor
- Years active: 2004–present
- Notable credit(s): Elle, Harper's Bazaar, Surface magazine,, Editorialist, Luisa Via Roma

Kate Davidson Hudson is an American magazine editor and digital media entrepreneur.

She held editorial roles at Elle and Harper's Bazaar before she co-founded Editorialist.

== Education ==
She graduated magna cum laude with degrees in liberal arts and journalism at George Washington University.

== Career ==
She has worked at Surface and Harper's Bazaar for five years as executive fashion accessories editor and Elle for four years, where she was accessories director for two years.

During her editorial career, she covered the luxury designer accessories market in London, Milan, Paris, and New York, as well as the watch and jewelry markets in Geneva and Basel, Switzerland.

During her time as Elle's accessories director, she re-launched and directed content for Elle Accessories magazine online in March 2010 and April 2010 and started its first accessories blog and managed and directed material for the print issue in 2012.

In 2013, left after many years as Elle magazine's accessories director by founding the online magazine Editorialist. She was chief executive officer of Editorialist. In 2015 she led Editorialist's Series A raise and expanded its editorial platform.

She is chief development officer of Luisa Via Roma and editorial chief of its LVR magazine.
