= Maria Kulikovska =

Ukrainian multimedia artist and performance artist

- Born: 11 February 1988 (age 38); Kerch, Crimea, Ukrainian SSR, Soviet Union
- Education: De Montfort University, Leicester, UK (PhD Degree in Drama, Performance and Fine Arts), Konstfack University of Arts, Crafts and Design, Stockholm, Sweden (MA in Fine Arts), National Academy of Fine Arts and Architecture, Kyiv, Ukraine (MA in Architecture)
- Known for: Sculpture, Performance art, Drawings, Paintings
- Website: mariakulikovska.net

Maria Kulikovska (born 1988) is a Ukrainian multimedia and performance artist. She has been forced to flee her home twice – first from Crimea in 2014 during the Russian annexation, and then once again from Kyiv in 2022 when the war erupted. Through her work, she explores the perpetuation, transformation, and decay of her body—reflecting the fragility of life through her lived experience. Kulikovska currently lives and works between London, Stockholm and Kyiv. Her works have been exhibited in collections such as Mystetskyi Arsenal Museum, Ukraine; Francisco Carolinum Linz, Austria; and FENIX Museum of Migration, Netherlands.

== Biography ==
Maria Kulikovska graduated from the National Academy of Fine Arts and Architecture in Kyiv and Konstfack University in Stockholm. In 2017, she was selected for a residency at the Liverpool Biennial and held her first solo institutional exhibition at the Francisco Carolinum Linz, Austria in September 2022. Since then, her work has been presented internationally, including in New York, London, Hong Kong, Zurich, Germany, Vienna, and Norway, among others.

In April 2022, Kulikovska was invited to the Neue Nationalgalerie in Berlin to stage her durational performance 254, during which the artist laid motionless on the steps of the museum covered by a Ukrainian flag. This work was first performed, unauthorized, in 2014 during the opening of Manifesta 10 in St. Petersburg, Russia. Its title, 254, refers to the number that Kulikovska received while fleeing to Kyiv after the 2014 Russian annexation of Crimea.

== Education ==
2024–28 PhD, Drama, Performance and Fine Arts, De Montfort University, Leicester, UK — AHRC Midlands4Cities Doctoral Award

2018–20 MFA, Konstfack University of Arts, Crafts and Design, Stockholm, Sweden — Royal Swedish Academy of Fine Arts Award

2016–17 Postgraduate course, Modernist Legacies and Constructions of Whiteness, Royal Institute of Fine Arts, Stockholm, Sweden

2007–13 Master of Architecture, National Academy of Fine Arts and Architecture, Kyiv, Ukraine (worked as architect in China and Switzerland before returning to art practice)

== Exhibitions ==
=== Solo and two-person exhibitions ===
- Bullets of Flowers — Solo Thematic Pavilion (curated by Eszter Csillag), Malta Biennale 2026, Birgu Old Armoury, Malta (2026)
- To Regenerate the Lost, Double Q Gallery, Hong Kong (2025)
- Once Leda Found an Egg – Blue Like a Hyacinth, Mriya Gallery, New York, USA (2025)
- My Body is a Battlefield, Jøssingfjord Vitenmuseum, Flekkefjord, Norway (2023)
- Resilience: Voices of Ukraine (with Artem Volokitin), Double Q Gallery, Hong Kong (2023)
- Die Tafel 2, Freie Akademie der Künste Hamburg, (2023)
- My Body is a Battlefield, Francisco Carolinum Linz, Austria (2022)
- My Skin is My Business, Odesa Fine Arts Museum, Odesa, Ukraine (2019)
- PREVIEW – Eva Kot’átková and Maria Kulikovska, Art Collection Telekom, National Museum of Sculpture, Królikarnia Palace, Warsaw, Poland (2016)

=== Group exhibitions ===
- A European Collection: Masterpieces from the Khanenko Museum, Museen der Stadt Aschaffenburg, Germany
- I am a problem here.?, M17 Contemporary Art Center, Kyiv, Ukraine (2025)
- Resilience Formula, M17 Contemporary Art Center, Kyiv, Ukraine (2024)
- Kaleidoscope of (Hi)stories. Ukrainian Art 1912–2023, Albertinum, Dresden, Germany (2023)
- ART ON THE BATTLEFRONT, Albertina Modern, Vienna, Austria (2023)
- Don’t Dream Dreams, MG+ Museum of Modern Art, Ljubljana, Slovenia (2023)
- 254 (Performance), Neue Nationalgalerie, Berlin, Germany (2022)
- What is the Proper Way to Display a Flag?, Weserburg Museum of Modern Art, Bremen, Germany (2022)
- The Borders of Reality, Ukrainian Pavilion, NordArt, Büdelsdorf, Germany (2021)
- Amazing Stories of Crimea, Mystetskyi Arsenal, Kyiv, Ukraine (2019)
- Permanent Revolution. Ukrainian Art Today, Ludwig Museum, Budapest, Hungary (2018)
- UK/RAINE: Emerging Artists from the UK and Ukraine, Saatchi Gallery, London, UK (2015)
- Premonition: Ukrainian Art Now, Saatchi Gallery, London, UK (2014)
- Gender, Izolyatsia Art Centre, Donetsk, Ukraine (2012)
- Independent, Mystetskyi Arsenal, Kyiv, Ukraine (2011)

== Public collections ==
- Museen der Stadt Aschaffenburg, Germany
- Adamovskiy Foundation, Kyiv, Ukraine
- Art Collection Telekom, Bonn, Germany
- FENIX Museum of Migration, Rotterdam, Netherlands
- Francisco Carolinum Linz, Austria
- Jøssingfjord Vitenmuseum, Flekkefjord, Norway
- Mystetskyi Arsenal National Art and Culture Museum Complex, Kyiv, Ukraine
- Odesa Fine Arts Museum, Odesa, Ukraine
- The Droom and Daad Foundation, Rotterdam, Netherlands

== Awards and recognition ==
=== Awards and nominations ===
- Nord Art Public Choice Award, Germany (2021)
- Cosmopolitan International nominee for cultural impact in Ukraine (2018–2019)
- UK/RAINE nominee for sculpture award, Saatchi Gallery, UK (2015)
- Pinchuk Art Prize nominee, Ukraine (2013)
- MUHi competition nominee, Shcherbenko Art Art Centre, Ukraine (2010)

=== Residencies and fellowships ===
- HIAP Art Residence and Ukraine Solidarity Residences Program, Finland (2022–2023)
- OÖ LandesKultur GmbH Art Residence Award, Austria (2022)
- Passinger Fabrik Culture Center with Munich Culture Ministry residency grant, Germany (2018)
- Liverpool Biennial Art Residence with the British Institute, UK (2017)
- Ruta Runa Art Residency Award with the Swedish Institute, Ukraine–Sweden (2013)
- AKKU and Uster Culture Ministry Art Residence Award, Switzerland (2012–2013)
