= Onuchin =

Onuchin (Russian: Онучин) is a Russian masculine surname, its feminine counterpart is Onuchina. The surname originates from onuchi, a Russian word for puttee.

== See also ==
- Onuch
