= Mystetskyi Arsenal National Art and Culture Museum Complex =

Coordinates: 50.4342°N 30.5534°E

Mystetskyi Arsenal

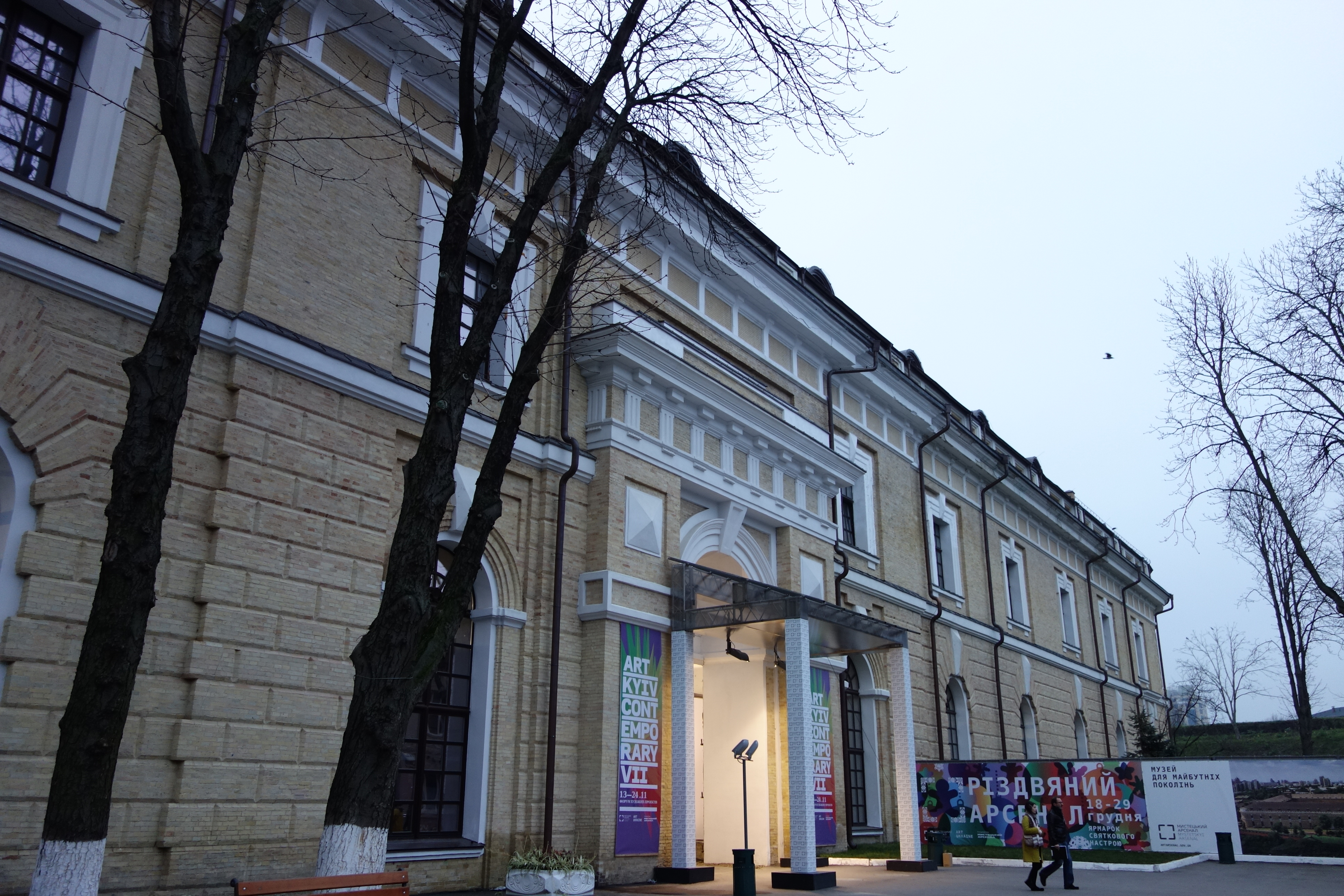
- Established: May 22, 2006; 20 years ago
- Location: 10-12 Lavrska Street; Kyiv, Ukraine
- Type: Art museum
- Visitors: 173,550 (2018)
- Director: Olesia Ostrovska-Liuta
- Public transit access: Subway: Arsenalna (Kyiv Metro)
- Website: artarsenal.in.ua/en/

The Mystetskyi Arsenal National Art and Culture Museum Complex, also known as Mystetskyi Arsenal (Ukrainian: Мистецький арсенал, lit. 'Artistic arsenal') is Ukraine's flagship public cultural institution, a museum and art exhibition complex located at 10–12 Lavrska Street, in Kyiv, Ukraine.

The total exhibition area of the historic venue is 60,000 m^{2}, one of the largest in Europe. The institution's stated mission is to modernize Ukrainian society through raising awareness of social issues, fostering communication with the international community, and introducing outstanding local and international artists to the world.

The complex was visited by 173,550 visitors in 2018. It hosted 6 exhibitions, 2 festivals, 299 guided tours, 52 educational projects and 13 large-scale theatrical productions the same year. The venue also hosts Ukraine's biggest annual book fair, attended by 50,000 visitors.

The complex is legally under the control of the State Management of Affairs.

== History ==
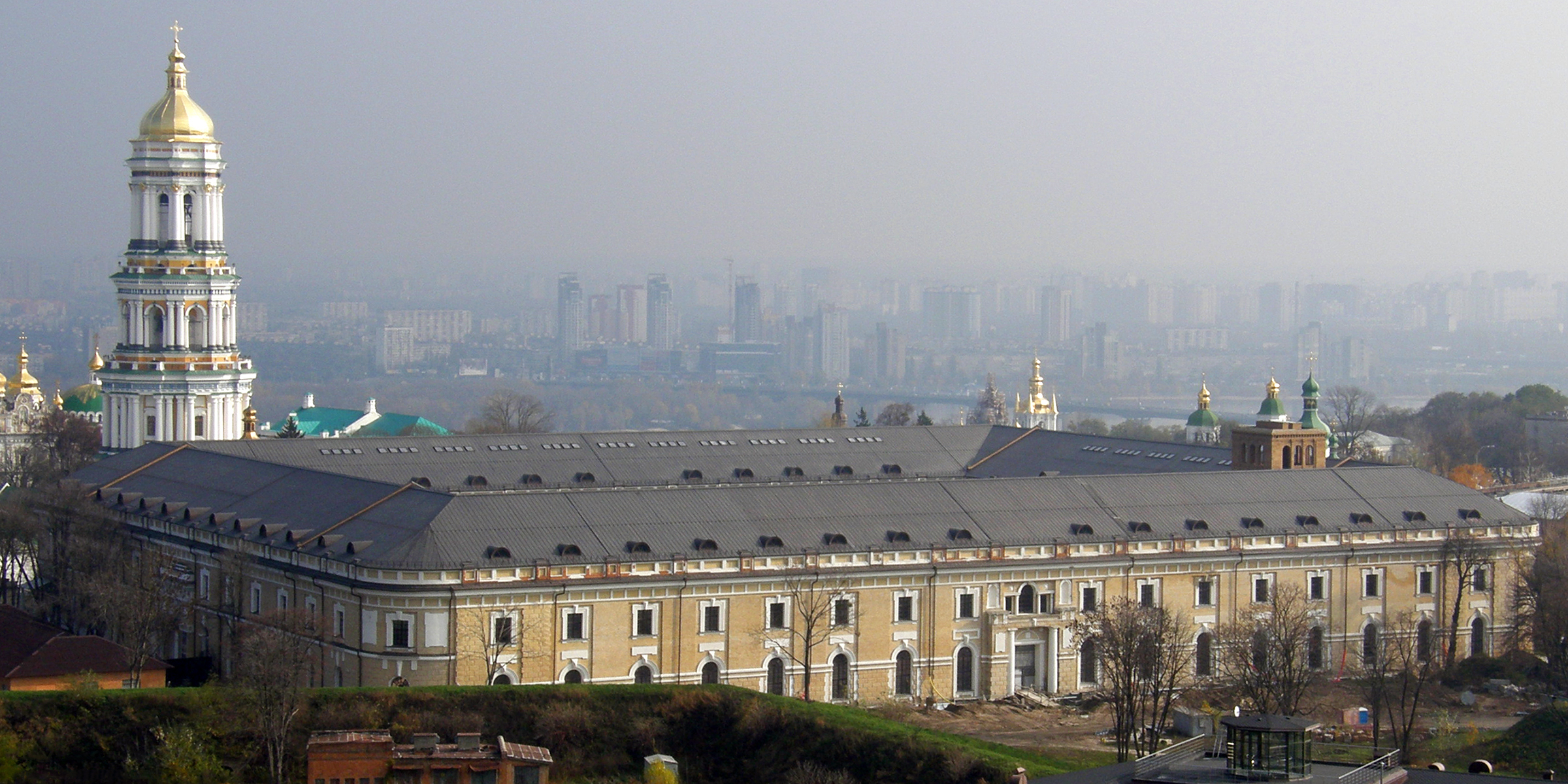
General view of the Mystetskyi Arsenal with the Lavra Monastery visible in the background

The unique art complex has a rich history and is located in a building intended as a workshop for the manufacturing, repair work and storage of ammunition and cannons, as part of the major Pechersk citadel complex. This original purpose explains the building's massive walls, over 183 cm (6 feet) thick.

It was built on the former site of a female monastic community dating back to the 1540s — the Voznesenskyi (Ascension) Pechersk monastery. A major patroness of the monastery in the early 18th century was Hetman Ivan Mazepa's mother — Mariia Magdalyna.

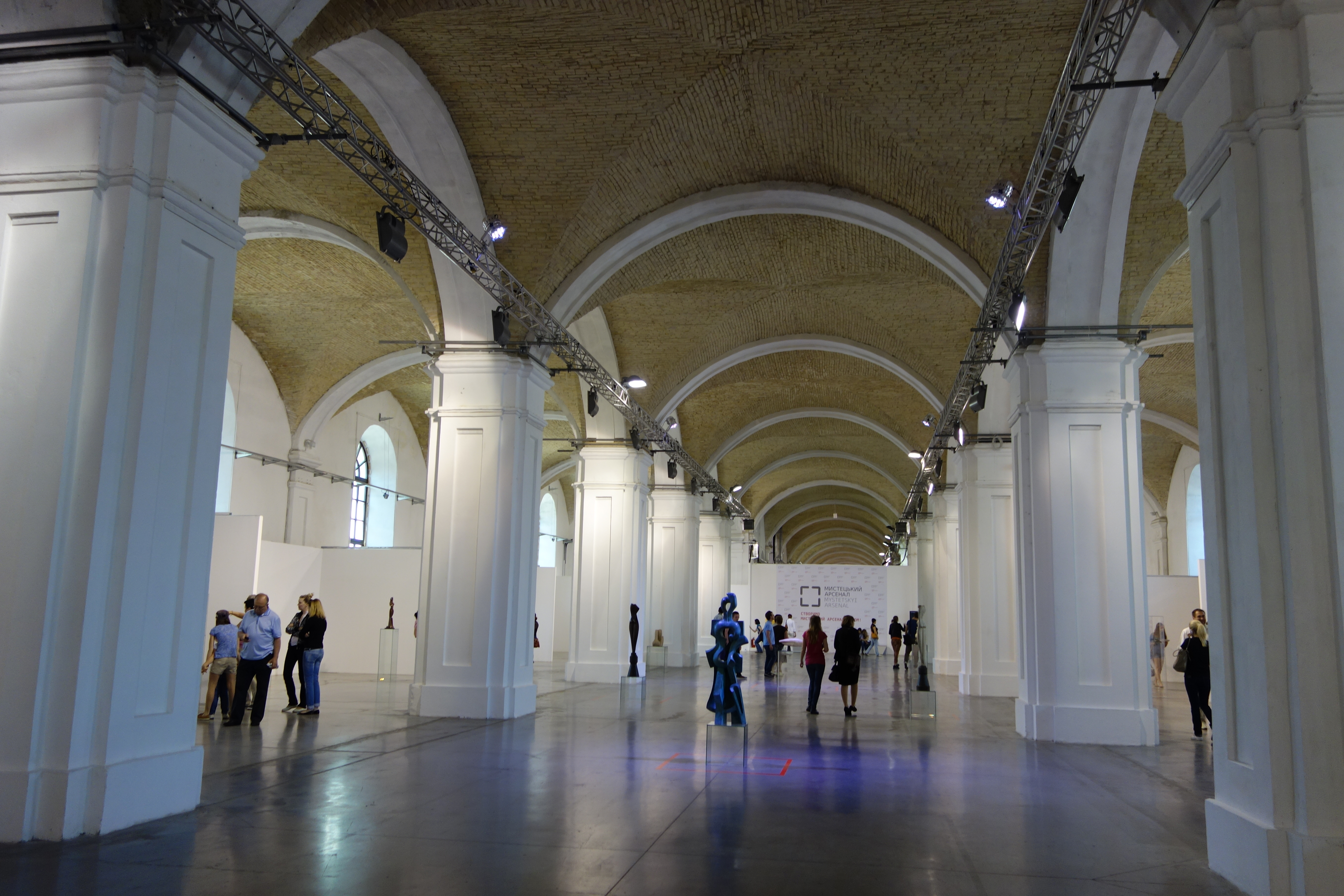
One of the galleries of the Mystetskyi Arsenal as seen following initial renovation works

Two churches that existed on the site of the monastery were subsequently dismantled to allow for the construction of the military workshop. However, their foundations remained and were excavated in 2005 in preparation for the opening of the Mystetskyi Arsenal to the public. The excavation revealed a major necropolis containing hundreds of burials of nuns and the presumed body of Mariia Magdalyna, as well as a host of objects of historical value dating back as early as the 1300s.

The complex was designed by an architect of German descent Karl Johann Shpekle in 1798. The construction of the current building was supervised by a military engineer by the name of Charles de Chardon, a native of Dohis, Aisne, Hauts-de-France, who was then living in Kyiv. The structure was subsequently completed by a local Ukrainian merchant by the name of Mykhailo Hryhorenko. The Arsenal building is unique — it is the first building in Kyiv in the style of classicism to be built of yellow Kyiv bricks. Due to the properties of local clay, the local bricks acquire a yellow-amber hue, leading to the informal name of "the porcelain Arsenal."

"Mystetskyi Arsenal" National Culture, Arts and Museum Complex was established on the initiative of the President of Ukraine Viktor Yushchenko under the Order of the Government of Ukraine № 49 of March 3, 2005.

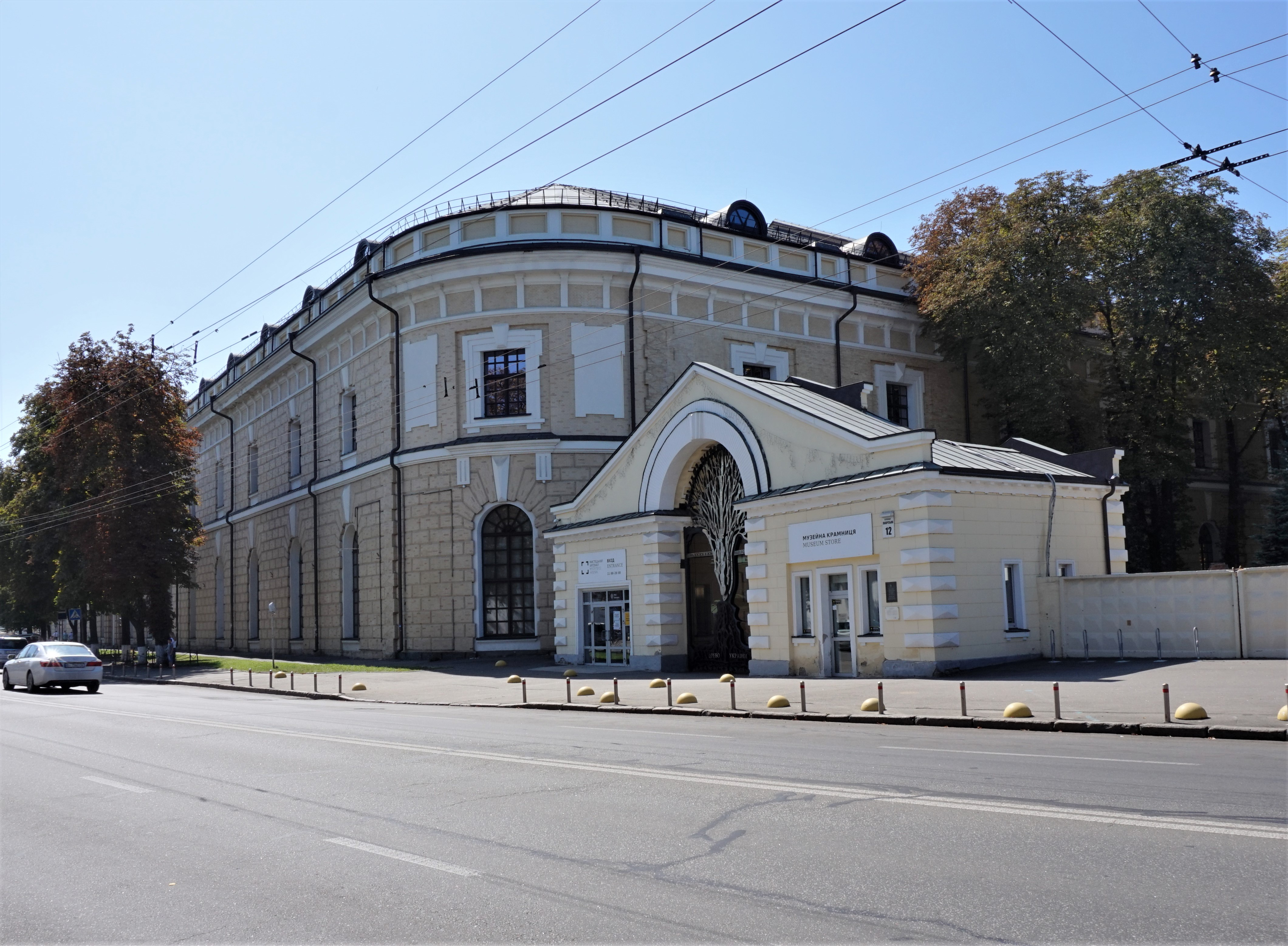
The building of Mystetskyi Arsenal

The Arsenal building was awarded architectural heritage monument status in 1979 and continued to be in use by the armed forces through the beginning of the 21st century. In 2003 Mystetskyi Arsenal National Art and Culture Museum Complex was created from the military facility. Large-scale archaeological excavations took place in the inner courtyard between 2005 and 2009.

In 2010 the entire complex was granted national monument status and conservation works are continuing while the facility remains open to the public.

Facing the threat of loss or destruction of collections during the 2022 Russian invasion of Ukraine, museum director Olesia Ostrovska-Liuta stated that: "When the war started, we had our instructions for how to act in this situation. We did our security plans and we are acting according to them. The museum is shut and guarded."

On 15 June 2026, the complex was among various cultural sites targeted by Russian drone attacks. Ukrainian minister of internal affairs Ihor Klymenko noted that emergency services were fighting a fire caused by a drone strike at the nearby Kyiv Pechersk Lavra when another hit the museum. The Arsenal's staff was unharmed.

== Mission ==
The mission of the Mystetskyi Arsenal is to promote the modernization of Ukrainian society and contribute to the integration of Ukraine into the world, based on the value and potential of Ukrainian culture.

Mystetskyi Arsenal does this by raising relevant social issues, establishing relationships with the international community, acquainting both the Ukrainian and the international community with each other's artistic and intellectual cultures, and thus stimulating mutual development.

The projects of the Mystetskyi Arsenal raise important societal issues, and provide space for creativity. The institution serves as a platform for interaction with the world cultural community through joint cultural projects.

Mystetskyi Arsenal serves as a mediator between professionals and the general public, explaining cultural and social phenomena, and their causes. It is a platform for education and interaction for a variety of audiences: adults, children and teens, artists and cultural workers.

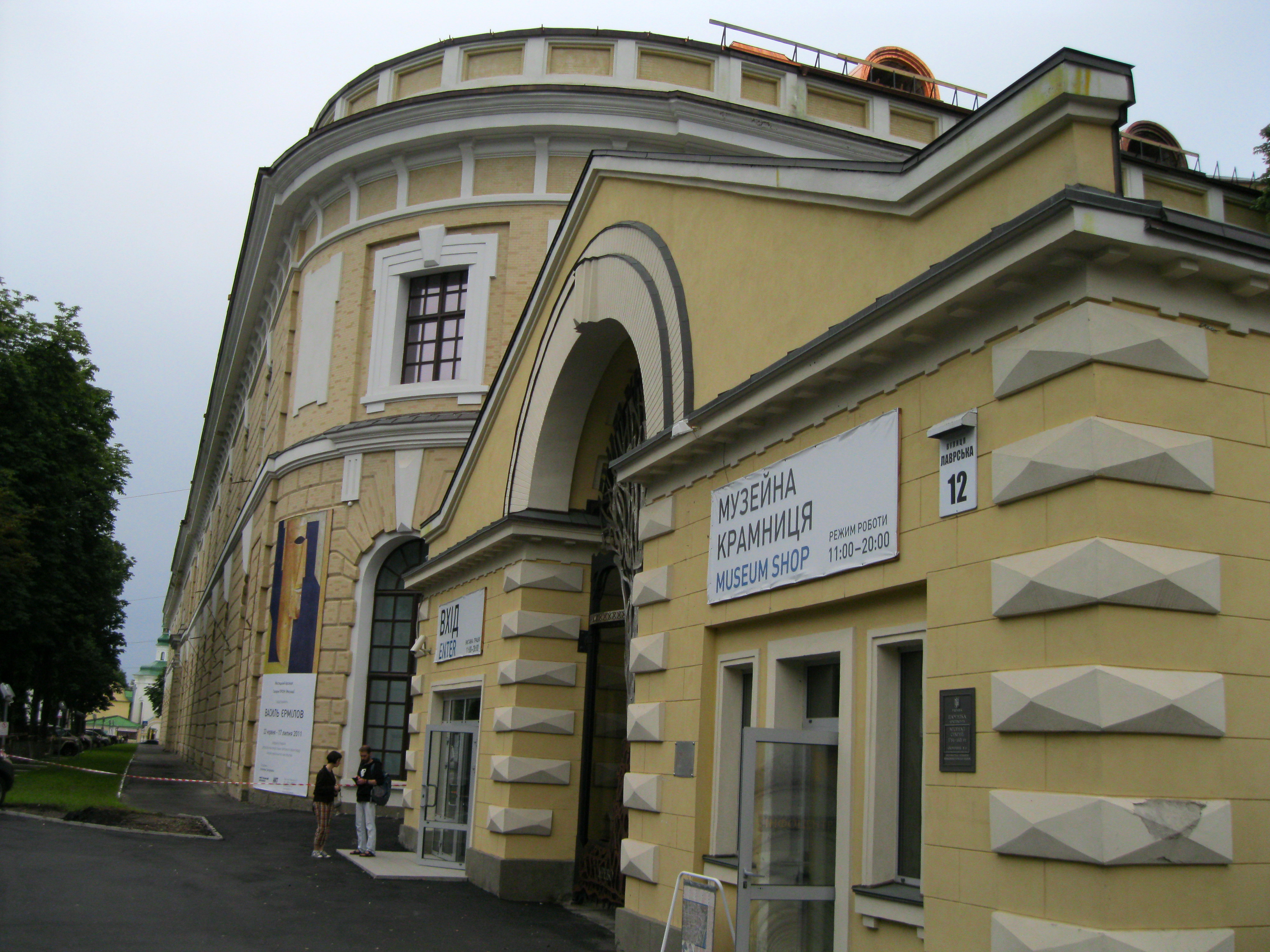
Mystetskyi Arsenal

Mystetskyi Arsenal integrates and develops various arts and cultural practices. Integration takes place through laboratory areas that constantly interact with each other. In this way, different arts develop and enrich each other. There is a Small Gallery on the territory of the Mystetskyi Arsenal, which presents young Ukrainian art, as well as the projects of leading domestic artists.

== Educational programs ==
Mystetskyi Arsenal aims to reorient the typical visitor experience from passive perception of information to active involvement and interaction with the exhibitions, professionals. Educational programs provide not only new knowledge and skills, but also the tools needed for critical thinking and creative self-expression.

Purposes:

1. Adaptation of information about exhibition projects for different audiences;
2. Creating a communicative space for discussion, interaction and development;
3. Content creation (educational and entertainment);
4. Systematization, preservation and dissemination of knowledge and experience among the professional community.

== Permanent programs ==
- Laboratory of Modern Visual Arts
- Literary Laboratory
- Theatrical Laboratory
- Summer Nights
- Museum Activities & Exhibition

== Exhibition history ==
- 18 – 27.05.2007 — Exhibition of works by the finalists of the competition "Museum of Contemporary Art – Laboratory–Improvisation".

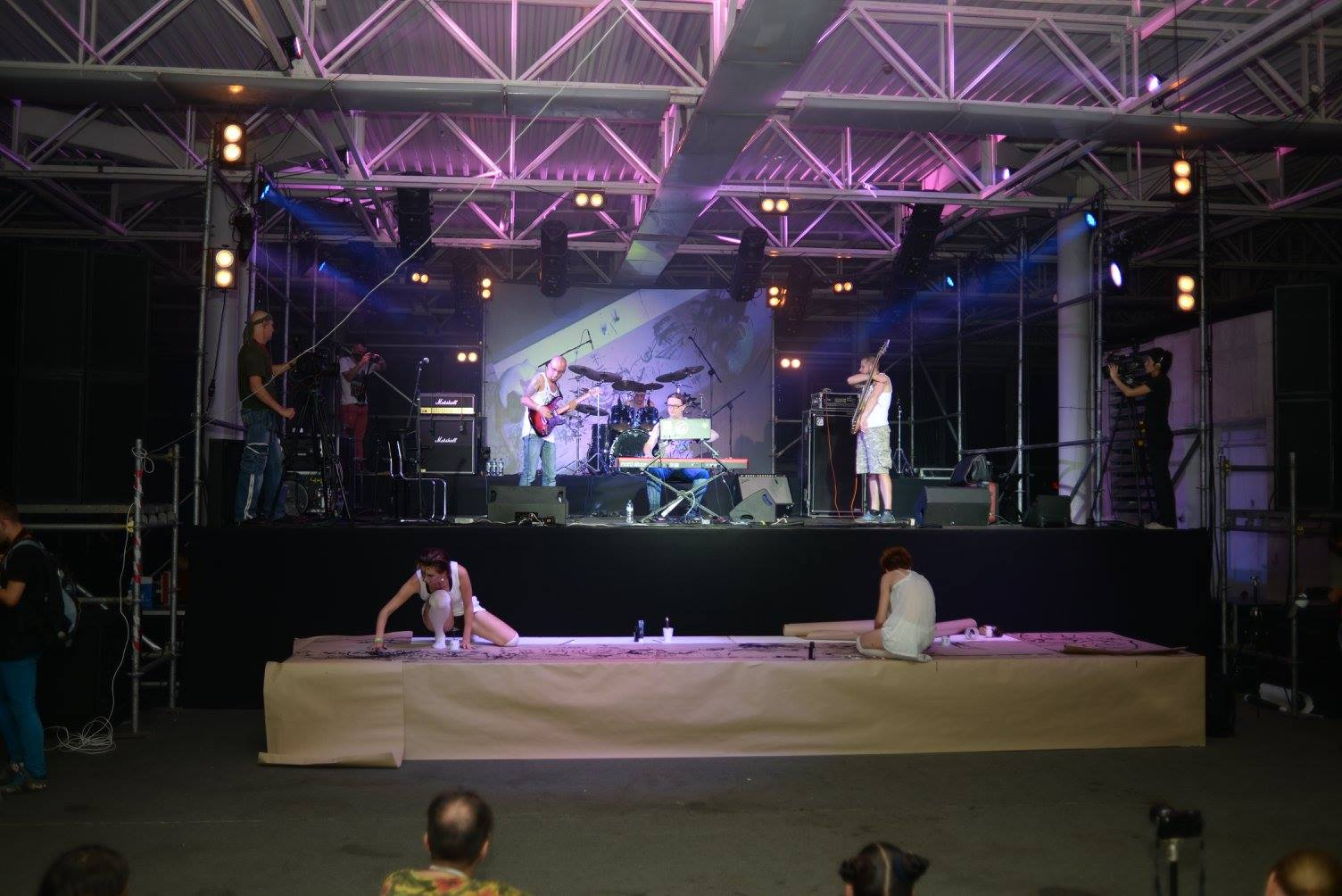
GOGOLfest, 2015

- 7 – 14.09.2007 — International Festival of Contemporary Art "GOGOLfest".
- 5 – 30.03.2008 — Exhibition of Alexander Pechorsky and Alexander Zhukovsky "Southern Colors".
- 1 – 20.04.2008 — Maxim Afanasyev's photo project "Landscapes".
- On August 23, 2009, on the eve of Independence Day, President Victor Yushchenko opened the first exhibition "De profundis" ("From the Depths") dedicated to Ukrainian sculpture.
- 11 – 27.09.2009 — International Festival of Contemporary Art "GOGOLfest".
- 9 – 14.11.2010 — The fifth International Art Fair "ART KYIV contemporary–2010".
- 15 – 26.12.2010 — "The third Great Antique Salon 2010". Presented a collection of "Masterpieces of Sacred Art of Ukraine of XVI–XVIII centuries" from the collections of leading Ukrainian museums in the special program "Guest Museum" – unique exhibits that were still in the museum vaults of the Chernihiv Regional Historical Museum.
- 17.02 – 13.03.2011 — "The Fifth Great Sculpture Salon 2011". For the first time in Ukraine, a collection was presented – a complete collection of masterpieces of sculpture by the unsurpassed French Impressionist Edgar Degas (1834–1917). The works of 40 leading Ukrainian masters of sculpture were presented.
- 5 – 28.04.2011 — International Week of Contemporary Art "Space Odyssey 2011".
- 13 – 22.05.2011 — Art Forum "FINE ART UKRAINE 2011". The exhibition called "SCHOOL", which included works by the most significant figures of Ukrainian art of the 1930s and 1980s – graduates of the National Academy of Visual Arts and Architecture of Ukraine.
- 28.05 – 01.06.2011 — The first international book forum "Book Arsenal".
- 22.06 – 17.07.2011 — Exhibition project "Vasyl Yermilov".
- 23.08 – 18.09.2011 — "Independent". The new art of the new country 1991–2011.
- 30.09 – 09.10.2011 — Igor Gaidai's photo exhibition "TOGETHER.UA".
- 11. 25. 2011 — The exhibition-project "The truth saves from death…" is dedicated to the tragedy that happened in the Bykivnia Forest and the memory of hundreds of thousands of killed innocent people.
- 23.11 – 04.12.2011 — Exhibition "60 years of world contemporary art". The joint project with the Portuguese gallery Cordeiros.
- 09–18.12.2011 — "The fourth Great Antique Salon 2011". A unique exposition of ancient weapons of the XVI–XVIII centuries.
- 24.05 – 31.07.2012 — The First Kyiv International Biennial of Contemporary Art "ARSENALE 2012". The best times, the worst times – the revival and apocalypse of contemporary art.
- 06 – 30.09.2012 — The innovative cultural and educational project for children and youth "SPARK! LAB is a laboratory for real inventors! ”
- 19 – 23.09.2012 — Music Box, KyivOutpost.
- 04 – 07.10.2012 — The second International Festival "Book Arsenal 2012".
- 13 – 30.09.2012 — The sixth Grand Sculpture Salon 2012. Zadok Ben-David. Simple Lines project, included three large–scale works: Evolution and Theory, Blackfield, Black flowers.
- 01 – 18.11.2012 — Forum of art projects "The seventh ART–KYIV Contemporary 2012".
- 06 – 16.12.2012 — The Fifth Great Antique Salon. Projects: "Collection in collection". Gallery of portraits of the famous Cossack–officer family Galagan and related famous Ukrainian families. Exhibition of works by Oleksa Novakivsky from the collection of Professor Mykola Mushynka (Slovakia). "Anatoly Limarev. Retrospective ". "Chiaroscuro" is a multimedia installation dedicated to the memory of Mykola Vinhranovsky.
- 29.04 –01.06.2014 — The exhibition "THE SHOW WITHIN THE SHOW".
- 08.06 – 29.06.2014 — The exhibition "The Ukrainian avant-garde scene".
- 11.07 – 20.07.2014 — The exhibition "A new Ukrainian dream".
- 05.02 – 09.03.2015 — The exhibition "Vikna".
- 05.03 – 15.03.2015 — The Seventh Great Sculpture Salon.
- 15.05 – 17.05.2015 — International festival of traditional cultures «EtnoSvit».
- 16.06 – 09.08.2015 — Kateryna Bilokur "I want to be an artist!".
- 20.08 – 06.09.2015 — The exhibition «Harlequin Is Leaving…».
- 06.11 – 06.12.2015 — The exhibition "World plastic art masterpieces".
- In 2015, the Arsenal hosted an exhibition of a unique private collection by Igor Dychenko, who dedicated his life to the study of works by Ukrainian artists of the twentieth century.
- 13.01 – 31.01.2016 — "Ivan Marchuk. The genotype of freedom.
- 11.02 – 14.02.2016 — "Arsenal of Love".
- 09.02 – 13.03.2016 — "Maria Primachenko. Boundless".
- 23.03 – 10.04.2016 — Large–scale museum project "Shadows of forgotten ancestors. Exhibition".
- 04.20 – 04.24.2016 — The sixth International Festival "Book Arsenal".
- 27.04 – 09.05.2016 — «Clouded Lands».
- 19.05 – 22.05.2016 — "Ethnosvit Festival".
- 01 – 05.06.2016 — "Arsenal of ideas" 2016.
- 09.06 – 07.08.2016 — "Malevich +".
- 12.07 – 07.08.2016 — Alexander Dubovik. "Archive of reservations".
- 20.10 – 27.11.2016 — "Ephemeroids. The twentieth century in the poster".
- 14.12 – 18.12.2016 — "Christmas Arsenal".
- 10 – 25.12.2016 — "What is your name?".
- 27.10 – 27.12.2016 — "The Horizon of events".
- 23.02 – 26.03.2017 — Oleksandr Hnylytsky "Reality of Illusion".
- 13.04 – 09.05.2017 — The "Pure Art" exhibition.
- 29.06 – 30.07.2017 — The exhibition "ARTWORK".
- 15.06 – 06.08.2017 — The exhibition "In Progress" – Ukrainian Dress Code since Independence.
- 28.09 – 29.10.2017 — Festival of young Ukrainian artists.
- 09.11 – 17.12.2017 — Japanese Art Exhibition
- 07.12.2017 – 28.01.2018 — BOYCHUKISM. Great style project
- 01.03 – 06.05.2018 — Flashback. Ukrainian media art of the 1990s.
- 25.05 – 24.06.2018 — Anders Petersen and the “Cafe Lehmits” series.
- 21.06 – 29.07.2018 — Kirill Protsenko "Impassioned".
- 12.07 – 12.08.2018 — "Instant time" exhibition.
- 17.10 – 02.12.2018 — Kurbas: New Worlds.
- 21.11.2018 – 27.01.2019 — "Revolutionize" exhibition.
- 26.02 – 05.05.2019 — The "Amazing Stories of Crimea" exhibition.
- 22.05 – 30.06.2019 — The "Obabich" exhibition. Viktor Marushchenko, Mark Neville and Sasha Kurmaz. Curated by Jerzy Onuch.
- 13.06 – 11.08.2019 — Oleg Holosiy "Non–stop Painting".
- 17.10.2019 – 19.01.2020 — Paraska Plytka–Horytsvit "Overcoming Gravity" exhibition.
- 12.12.2019 – 19.01.2020 — The exhibition "SPECIAL CARGO! The history of the return of Ukraine’s cultural property".
- 10.06 – 16.08.2020 — Imprint. Ukrainian printmaking of the XX–XXI centuries.
- 18.09.2020 – 24.01.2021 — Andrii Sahaidakovskyi's Scenery "Welcome!".

== See also ==
- Museums in Kyiv
