= Serhii Lytvynenko =

Ukrainian entrepreneur and politician

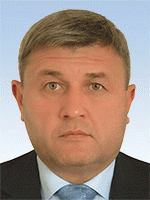

People's Deputy of Ukraine

9th convocation
- Incumbent
- Assumed office August 29, 2019

Personal details
- Born: 15 February 1968 (age 58) Poltava, Ukraine
- Education: Uzhhorod National University

Serhii Anatoliiovych Lytvynenko (Ukrainian: Сергій Анатолійович Литвиненко; born 15 February 1968, Poltava, Ukraine) is a Ukrainian entrepreneur and politician. People's Deputy of Ukraine of the 9th convocation.

== Bibliography ==
Graduated from the Chernihiv Pedagogical Institute on the specialty of “physical education teacher”; Uzhhorod National University on the specialty of a lawyer; National University of Food Technologies on the specialty of “food technologies”. Engaged in commercial activities in the sphere of the agro-industrial complex. Physical entrepreneur. Director of the enterprise.

== Political career ==
A candidate for people’s deputies from the political party ‘Servant of the People’ in 2019 parliamentary elections (the electoral district № 156, Berezne, Kostopil and Sarny rayons of Rivne Oblast). At the time of the election: the acting director of the enterprise ‘ZIRNENSKYY SPYRTOVYY ZAVOD, DP’, lives in Berezne of Rivne Oblast. Non-party. Date of gaining deputy’s authority: August 2019. Faction: Member of the "Servant of the People" political party parliamentary faction. Post: Member of the Verkhovna Rada of Ukraine Committee on Agrarian and Land Policy.

== Criticism ==
He was noticed by the Chesno movement in gross violation of the Verkhovna Rada regulations and the Constitution of Ukraine is not voting for another MP, Oleksandr Skichko, during the vote for the inclusion of the draft law on amendments to Articles 85 and 101 of the Constitution in the agenda of the session. The fact of violation of the Constitution was recorded by Radio Liberty and occurred on September 3 at 17:52. Because of this, Lytvynenko promised to donate his monthly salary to charitable foundations.

In addition, the MP underestimated the value of his property in his declarations and did not mention his son's car.

Lytvynenko declared his desire to hold elections in the territories of Donetsk and Luhansk regions temporarily occupied by Russian troops, which drew criticism. On June 24, in Rivne region, a fight broke out between the National Corps party and representatives of Lytvynenko's constituency in the MP's constituency.

== Honours ==
The badge of the trade union of agro-industrial complex workers of Ukraine ‘For the development of social partnership’.
