= Mykhailo Dzyndra =

Ukrainian sculptor (1921–2006)

- Миха́йло Васи́льович Дзи́ндра
- Born: 8 November 1921 (age 104); Demnia, Stanisławów Voivodeship, Poland
- Died: 8 August 2006 (aged 84); Lviv, Ukraine
- Resting place: Lychakiv Cemetery
- Education: Lviv Ivan Trush College of Decorative and Applied Arts
- Known for: Sculptures
- Style: Abstract, Modernist
- Movement: Ukrainian modernism

Mykhailo Dzyndra (Ukrainian: Миха́йло Васи́льович Дзи́ндра; 8 November 1921 – 8 September 2006) was a Ukrainian sculptor. He was known for his work synthesizing Ukrainian cultural symbolism with modernism. He spent most of his life in the United States.

A follow of Alexander Archipenko, he began his work in the 1940s after graduating from the Lviv Ivan Trush College of Decorative and Applied Arts. He started with figurative, realist works after immigrating to Czechoslovakia, Allied-occupied Germany, and finally to the United States. He then moved towards associative, abstract forms, which were known as his "sculpture of plastic associations" period. His style was often metaphysical during this time, with plastic contrasts and experimentation with surrounding space. After 1991, he returned to Ukraine, and in 2005 donated his works to found the Mykhaylo Dzyndra Modern Sculpture Museum in Lviv, which is a branch of Lviv Gallery of Art before his death the following year.

== Biography ==
Dzyndra was born on 8 November 1921 in the village of Demnia near Lviv, in the Stanisławów Voivodeship in the Second Polish Republic (now Ukraine). He had two other brothers, Yevhen and Stepan Dzyndra. After graduating from secondary school, he studied in Lviv in the private studio of sculptor of Andrii Koverko. He then attended the specialized artistic school called the Art and Industrial School, where he studied under sculptors Ivan Severa and Mykola Mukhin from 1942 to 1944.

After the end of World War II, he immigrated to Bratislava in Czechoslovakia, where he taught in a decorative woodcarving studio. Just over a year later, he then immigrated again, this time to Allied-occupied Germany. In Germany, he worked on sculptures and practiced in art exhibitions, and was a member of the Professional Union of Artists of Germany. While in Germany, he stayed in a refugee camp near Munich, and also helped establish another carving school that was attended by about 250 students of various nationalities. At the end of the decade, however, he finally immigrated to the United States. He spent the next few decades in the United States, until his return to Ukraine in 1991 following the 1991 Ukrainian independence referendum. To earn a living, he also worked on the side as a builder, buying old residential buildings, rebuilding them, and then selling them. During his early years in the United States in the 1950s, he worked in abstract art up until the early 1960s, when he destroyed the sculptures, with proof only being found in photographs. Most of these works utilized mimetic principles.

By the late 1960s, he started to abandon traditional mimetic principles in favor of open-to-interpretation, associative sculptural works. This period became known as the period of "sculpture of plastic associations" in his life, spanning from roughly 1967/8 to 1974. During this time, he focused on producing plastic counterparts of cultural concepts and ideas. This involved a deliberate conciseness and generalization of volumes, expressive silhouttes, and contrast between static mass and movement. He also frequently utilized spatial caesuras and counterforms, inspired by modernists like Alexander Archipenko.

During this phase, he also explored different themes. He did some sacred and folkloric words, such as "The Prophet" and angel variations, which mixed religious imagery with folklore and used grotesque distortion and magical realism. He also drew heavily on Ukrainian folk themes with his pieces such as "Ukrainian Woman" and "Little Cossack", which were between figuration and abstraction. He heavily fused cultural roots with modernism, inspired by Picasso and Brâncuși.

After 1974, he worked in the pursuit of "simple form", or art that was highly abstracted and carried no deliberate resemblance to objects, and called these creations "abstracts". This was due to the heavy influence of global avant-garde currents. In 1978, with support from the Ukrainian Artists' Association in the United States, he had an exhibit of his work displayed in New York. In 1991, he returned to Ukraine after decades abroad, and began exhibiting photographs of his structures at the National Museum in Lviv and in Kyiv. Over the course of the year, he also brought back all his sculptures and drawings to Ukraine, and purchased a plot of land in Briukhovychi in 1992 after deciding to permanently stay after "feeling a duty to his homeland". In April 2005, while already severely ill, he donated most of his sculpture works and his housing to the Lviv Gallery of Art. In autumn 2005, the Mykhaylo Dzyndra Modern Sculpture Museum officially opened.

== Personal life ==
He was married to a woman named Sofia.

He died on 8 September 2006 in Lviv, and was buried at Lychakiv Cemetery.

== Legacy ==
He was posthumously awarded the Order of Merit, 3rd class, in 2006 for his work.

In 2024, Ukrainian designer Ruslan Baginskiy dedicated a project to the sculptor.
