= Editorialist =

Luxury accessories e-commerce website

Editorialist is an e-commerce marketplace that offers styling services with a specialization in luxury fashion and accessories.

Editorialist combines luxury shopping experiences with a content-driven interface featuring interviews, videos, and trend reports.

== Background and Development ==
Editorialist launched on February 7, 2013, under the name Editorialist Magazine. Using their experience from Elle Magazine, co-founders Kate Hudson and Stefania Allen wanted to create a platform that used high-quality content to support a luxury e-commerce shopping experience.

Editorialist initially gained recognition as an online magazine before extending into additional services and offerings, including a concierge service and trend reports.

In 2017, Editorialist secured investment from Ithaca Ventures. That year, its retail revenue was reported as up 14 percent year-over-year (YoY) with a 114 percent increase in advertising revenue and a 61 percent increase in gross profit.

The company’s assets were purchased by Project YX owner Rafael Ortiz in 2019. Ortiz is an investor in technology companies and a co-founder of the comparison shopping site NexTag. Ortiz relaunched Editorialist in September 2019 with Allen.

Editorialist’s website reaches over 1.3 million unique monthly visitors.

== Services and Offerings ==
Editorialist offers online personal styling, content, and shopping services using proprietary technology and e-commerce tools. Monthly subscriptions to the app range from $500 to $1,500 for higher-touch services.

=== Virtual Styling and Wardrobe Curating ===
When Editorialist relaunched, the platform began offering membership-based virtual styling services accessible through an invitation-only app. Clients joining Editorialist receive a curated photo inventory of their wardrobe with personalized styling advice and recommendations for integrating new designer pieces. The service allows users to purchase suggested attire within the app. The AI elements of the app support a human stylist who makes styling decisions for Editorialist’s clients.

=== Website ===
Editorialist launched as a luxury accessories e-commerce website before adding a content-driven interface. The platform provides content, such as interviews, style guides, and fashion editorials, alongside a curated selection of luxury accessories available for purchase.

=== Print and Digital Publications ===
Beyond its digital presence, Editorialist ventured into print media, launching a biannual print magazine in 2014 featuring exclusive content, designer interviews, and celebrity features. The print magazine was shut down in 2019.

== Achievements and recognition ==
Editorialist has been acknowledged for its approach to luxury e-commerce and content curation.

=== The Council of Fashion Designers of America ===
The Council of Fashion Designers of America has recognized Editorialist as a unique platform in the luxury market, focusing exclusively on luxury accessories. This acknowledgment underlines Editorialist’s significance and contribution to the luxury fashion ecosystem.

=== Investment by Ithaca Ventures ===
In 2017, music entrepreneur Scooter Braun invested in Editorialist through his Ithaca Ventures holding company. Braun cited Editorialist as “disrupters of their industry,” taking on a consulting role in the company.
