= Jerzy Onuch =

Canadian-Polish artist and curator

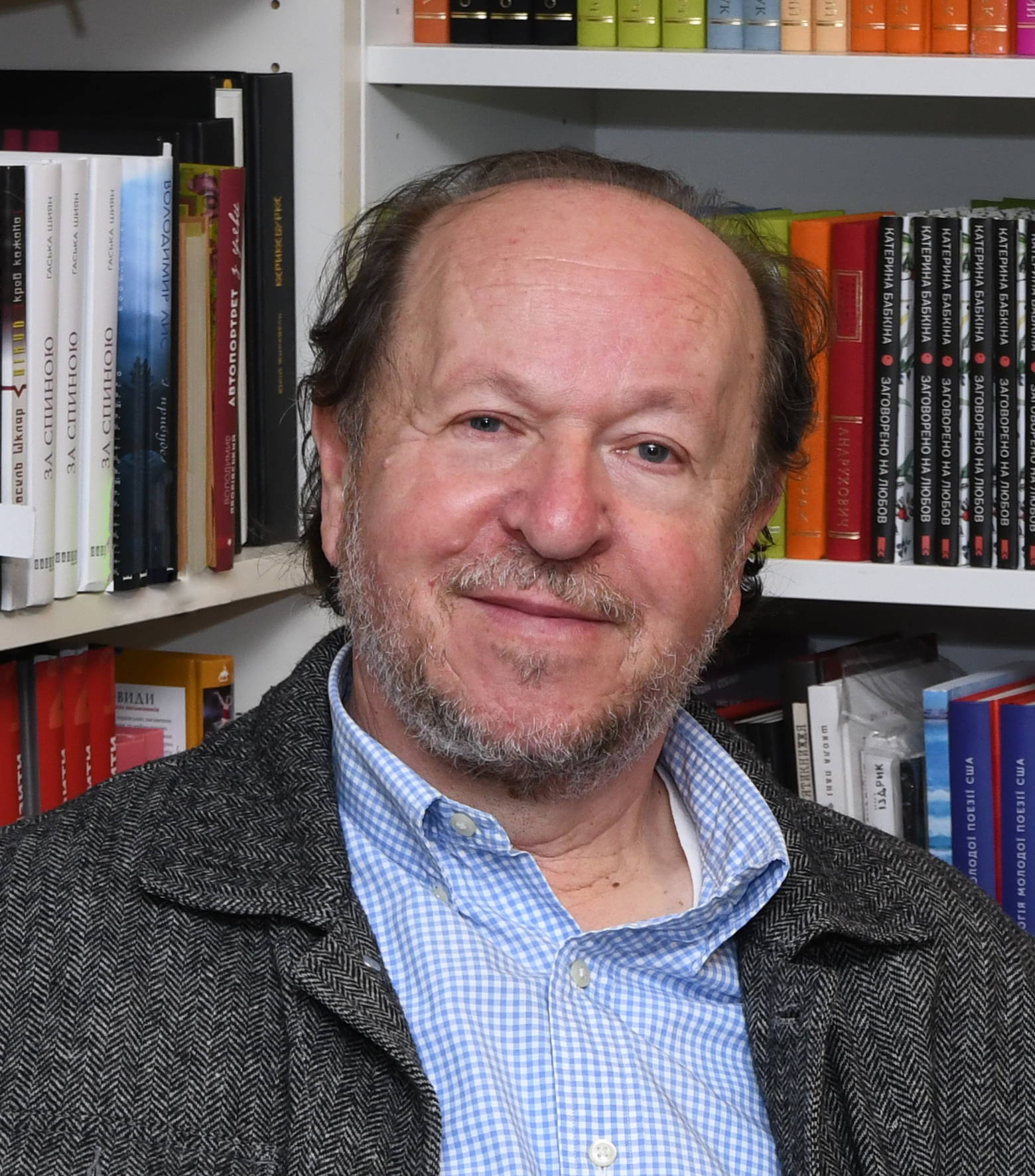
- Director of Polish Institute in Kyiv, Ukraine. Counsellor to the Embassy of the Republic of Poland in Ukraine.
- Born: July 28, 1954 (age 72); Lublin, Poland
- Education: Academy of Fine Art Warsaw, Poland
- Known for: Painting, Performance art
- Movement: Contemporary art

Jerzy Onuch (also Yuri Onuch, born July 28, 1954) is a contemporary artist and curator. He has been working as an artist since the late 1970s, presenting performance and installation works in Europe and North America. From 2005 to 2010, he held the diplomatic post of Director of the Polish Institute in Kyiv, Ukraine. Between 2010 and 2014 he was the director of the Polish Cultural Institute in New York.

Jerzy was born and raised in Poland, emigrated to Canada in 1987 and returned to Poland and later Ukraine in the mid 1990s. He is married with one daughter.

Jerzy has, in 2005, completed his tenure at the Center for Contemporary Art (CCA) in Kyiv, Ukraine (formally the George Soros Centre for Contemporary Arts as part of the Soros Foundation). His tenure was one of the longest and most successful in the history of the center. Under his leadership, the CCA promoted education and exposure of contemporary art (both Ukrainian and International). But more importantly Jerzy promoted young Ukrainian artists and student involvement in the CCA. During the "Orange Revolution" the CCA became a political centre for young artists-activists (now called REP) who used the centre's premises for the creation of "revolutionary art". During his tenure at the CCA Jerzy was also a public and at times a political force, often treated by friends, colleagues and competitors as a moral authority on the development and state of arts and culture in post-communist Ukraine.

== Career ==
=== The early years: art and politics ===
Educated at the Academy of Fine Arts in Warsaw, Jerzy Onuch received his Master of Fine Arts degree in 1979, specializing in painting, graphics and art education. As an artist, he matured in Poland in the early 1980s, a period of artistic freedom, vitality and opportunity unique in postwar Eastern Europe.

Mr Onuch began to take part in solo and group shows in 1976 and, in 1980, he became director and curator of a gallery affiliated with the Academy (Pracownia Dziekanka w Warszawie) and devoted to innovative and experimental programs. As a curator, he organized, in the period 1980 to 1986, over 70 art exhibits and art events. The Gallery Dziekanka, which he help run with his friends Janusz Bałdyga and Łukasz Szajna was highly progressive and naturally politically charged as it was born during the rise of the pro-democratic Solidarity movement.

While heading the experimental gallery, Mr Onuch also worked as an artist creating installations and staging performances . As a recognized artist in Poland, in 1981–1983 he was invited to an International Art Workshop in Germany and, in 1986, to Vancouver where he represented the East European art scene at the "Strategies for Survival" art conference. His own work continued to be both philosophically and politically charged.

=== North America and beyond: Canadian, Pole, Ukrainian and artist ===
In 1987, after spending one year in the United States, Mr Onuch settled in Toronto, Ontario, Canada. He continued to work in performance art and installation, curating and teaching. He was invited to stage performances at such places as the Wexner Center for Visual Arts in Columbus, Ohio (1990), the Interzone Festival in Quebec City (1992), Center For Contemporary Art Ujazdowski Castle, Warsaw (1993 and 1995), Harvard Ukrainian Research Institute in Boston (1996), Center For Contemporary Art "Brama" Kyiv (1994) and at the New Music and Art Festival, Bowling Green State University in Ohio (1996).

Mr Onuch has been invited back to Poland to stage performances and to lecture many times in 1991, 1992, 1993, 1995, 2002 and 2003. Since 1991, when he was asked to be a juror at the first post Soviet contemporary art exhibit held in Lviv, Ukraine, he has sought out significant Ukrainian artists. In 1993 he organized and curated one of the first large exhibits of contemporary Ukrainian art in the West - the "Steppes of Europe", which was held at the Centre for Contemporary Art "Ujazdowski Castle" in Warsaw. The exhibit was extensively covered in the Polish media. The critics noted that the exhibit presented a vision of Ukrainian art that defied all stereotypes.

=== Back to Ukraine: Back to art and politics ===
In July 1997 (until 2005) Mr Onuch was the director of the Center for Contemporary Art at the National University "Kyiv-Mohyla Academy" in Kyiv, Ukraine (since 1999 the International Foundation Center for Contemporary Art). During his tenure the Center presented many Ukrainian and International artists including: Andy Warhol, Joseph Beuys, Nam June Paik, Ilya Kabakov, Joseph Kosuth, Tony Ousler, Leon Tarasewicz, Arsen Savadov, Taras Polataiko, Boris Mikhailov, Serhiy Bratkov, Illya Chichkan, Andrij Sahaidakovskyi, Olexandr Roidburd, Masoch Fund, Oleg Kulik and others.

Most recently, Jerzy Onuch curated Polish artist Miroslaw Maszlanko in Kyiv, Taras Polataiko, as the Ukrainian presentation at XXV São Paulo Bienal in Brazil, the Masoch Fund at The Lux Gallery in London, England, and Viktor Marushchenko, as the Ukrainian Presentation at XXIV São Paulo Bienal.

In February, 2003 the Korrespondent magazine (Ukrainian variation of Newsweek or Time magazine) named Mr Onuch as one of the 10 most influential foreign citizens working in Ukraine. In 2005 Mr Onuch joined the Polish Ministry of Foreign Affairs and served as a Counsellor to the Embassy of the Republic of Poland in Ukraine in Kyiv and Director of the Polish Institute.

Jerzy Onuch’s multi-faceted career in the arts has been written about in various reviews and articles and his achievements acknowledged by various award-granting bodies such as the T. Shevchenko Foundation, the Canada Council, the Polish Ministry of Culture, the International Renaissance Foundation, Kyiv, U.S. Department of State, Pro Helvetia, Zurich, the Saskatchewan Arts Board, Saskatoon, Canada.
