= Viktor Marushchenko =

Ukrainian photographer

Viktor Ivanovych Marushchenko
- Born: 1 February 1946; Novosibirsk, USSR
- Died: 28 September 2020 (aged 74); Kyiv, Ukraine
- Known for: Documentary photography

Viktor Ivanovych Marushchenko (Ukrainian: Віктор Іванович Марущенко; born 1 February 1946 in Novosibirsk, USSR; died 28 September 2020 in Kyiv) was a Ukrainian documentary photographer and educator. From 1999 to 2000, he was head of the Kyiv branch of the National Union of Photographers of Ukraine. In 2001, Marushchenko took part in the main exhibition of the 49th Venice Biennale with his photo series on the Chernobyl nuclear disaster.

== Biography ==
Marushchenko was born on 1 February 1946 in Novosibirsk, where his parents had moved from Kyiv during the Second World War.

In 1951, Marushchenko returned to Kyiv. He first attended the vocational school for radio electronics and the Institute of Food Industry in Kyiv.

In the mid-1970s, he began working as a theatre photographer. From 1980 to 1991, he worked as a photojournalist for the Moscow-based newspaper Sovetskaya Kultura in the Ukrainian SSR; he then worked as a photographer for the Ukrainian newspaper Den from 1997 to 1998, after which he remained active as a freelance photographer and artist.

In 2004, he founded the Viktor Marushchenko School of Photography in Kyiv, at which he served as director and lecturer. A number of Ukrainian and international artists taught at the school, including Boris Mikhailov, Valeriy Miloserdov, Oleksandr Glyadyelov and Sasha Kurmaz.

In 2010, Marushchenko published the first issue of the photography magazine 5.6, which featured Ukrainian and international contemporary photography.

Marushchenko passed away on 28 September 2020 at the age of 74.

== Art ==
In 1989, Viktor Marushchenko temporarily relocated to Switzerland and took part in the exhibition “A Hundred Photographers of Eastern Europe” at the Musée de l’Élysée in Lausanne; thereafter, he regularly held exhibitions across Europe and North America.

Among Marushchenko's most significant works are the Chornobyl photo series (1986–2005), exhibited at the 49th Venice Biennale in 2001 (curated by Harald Szeemann), as well as the photographic project Dreamland Donbas about illegal miners in eastern Ukraine, exhibited at the São Paulo Biennial in 2004. In 2000, Marushchenko's photographs were shown alongside works by the Ukrainian artist Maria Prymachenko at an exhibition in Berlin.

In 1997, Benteli Verlag in Bern, Switzerland, published the photo book Viktor Maruščenko. Ukraine. Fotografien with texts in German and Ukrainian (edited by Hugo and Iryna Schär-Tkachenko; ISBN 978-3-7165-1096-4).
