= Luisaviaroma =

Online luxury fashion retailer

LUISAVIAROMA
- Company type: LUISAVIAROMA S.p.a.
- Industry: Clothing retail, luxury fashion
- Founded: 1929
- Headquarters: Florence, Italy
- Key people: Andrea Panconesi, President and Founder. Tommaso Maria Andorlini, CEO. Annagreta Panconesi, Creative Director.
- Products: Designer clothes, Shoes, Bags, Accessories
- Website: luisaviaroma.com

Luisaviaroma, also known as LVR, is a luxury retailer which offers high-end fashion, home decor, and lifestyle products. It was founded in 1929 by the family of Andrea Panconesi.
