= Ukrainian Fashion Week =

Fashion event in Ukraine

Ukrainian Fashion Week Український Тиждень Моди
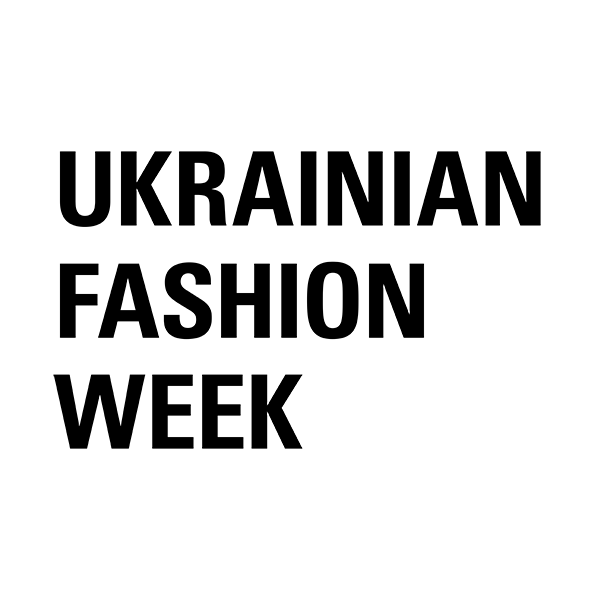
- The logo of Ukrainian Fashion Week since 2017.
- Genre: Clothing and fashion exhibitions
- Frequency: Semi-annually
- Locations: Kyiv, Ukraine (usually at the Mystetskyi Arsenal National Art and Culture Museum Complex)
- Inaugurated: 1997
- Founder: Irina Danilevskaya
- Organiser: Ukrainian Fashion Council
- Website: fashionweek.ua

Ukrainian Fashion Week (Ukrainian: Український Тиждень Моди; UFW) is a clothing trade show held semi-annually at the Mystetskyi Arsenal National Art and Culture Museum Complex in Kyiv, Ukraine. It is held during the spring/summer and autumn/winter each year. UFW has been held since 1997 and was mainly founded by Irina Danilevskaya.

== History ==
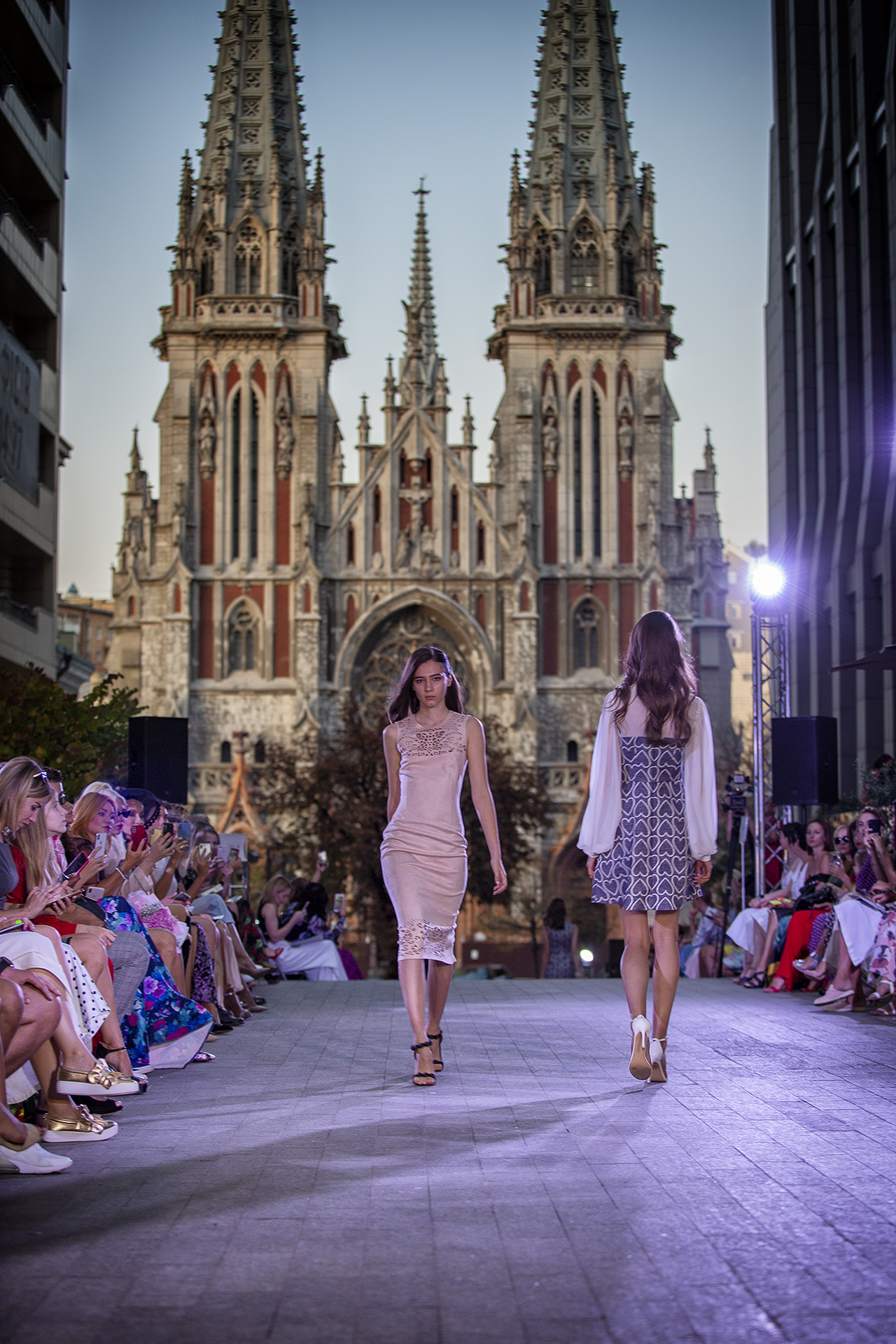
A shot of the fashion week during the spring-summer show in 2020.

The first Ukrainian Fashion Week was held in 1997 at the Actor's House in Kyiv as a ready-to-wear show called "Fashion Seasons". It was conceived after designer Sergei Bizov came to Irina Danilevskaya, the editor-in-chief of the fashion magazine "Eva", and asked about doing a Ukrainian Fashion Week, similar to London Fashion Week. In 1997, she finally conceived the idea alongside the founder of RIA Yanko Nechyporuk. In total, there were 13 brands and designers present for the first year. In 1998, AVON became the general partner and sponsor of the fashion week. In 2000 the show started allowing younger models to walk the show, and the following years, political designs started to be added to the show.

In 2005, the name of the show was changed to Ukrainian Fashion Week. Danilevskaya stated the decision to change the name coincided with what the council wanted it to represent: to represent the work of Ukrainian designers and start to invite foreign media and other projects to the show. It was briefly held at Pushkin Park in Kyiv in the late 2000s to 2010.

After the start of the Russian invasion of Ukraine, the event started to be limited but returned for 2 years since 2022. Previous editions since the start of the invasion were held as the "Support Ukrainian Fashion" in London, Paris, and Copenhagen. The 2024 edition, the first edition to be held since the invasion, included more than 50 Ukrainian brands like Frolov.

== Attendance ==
The week has typically had over 50 designers and pulls in around 20,000 attendees.

== See also ==
- Fashion week
- List of fashion events
