= Cultural impact of Harry Styles =

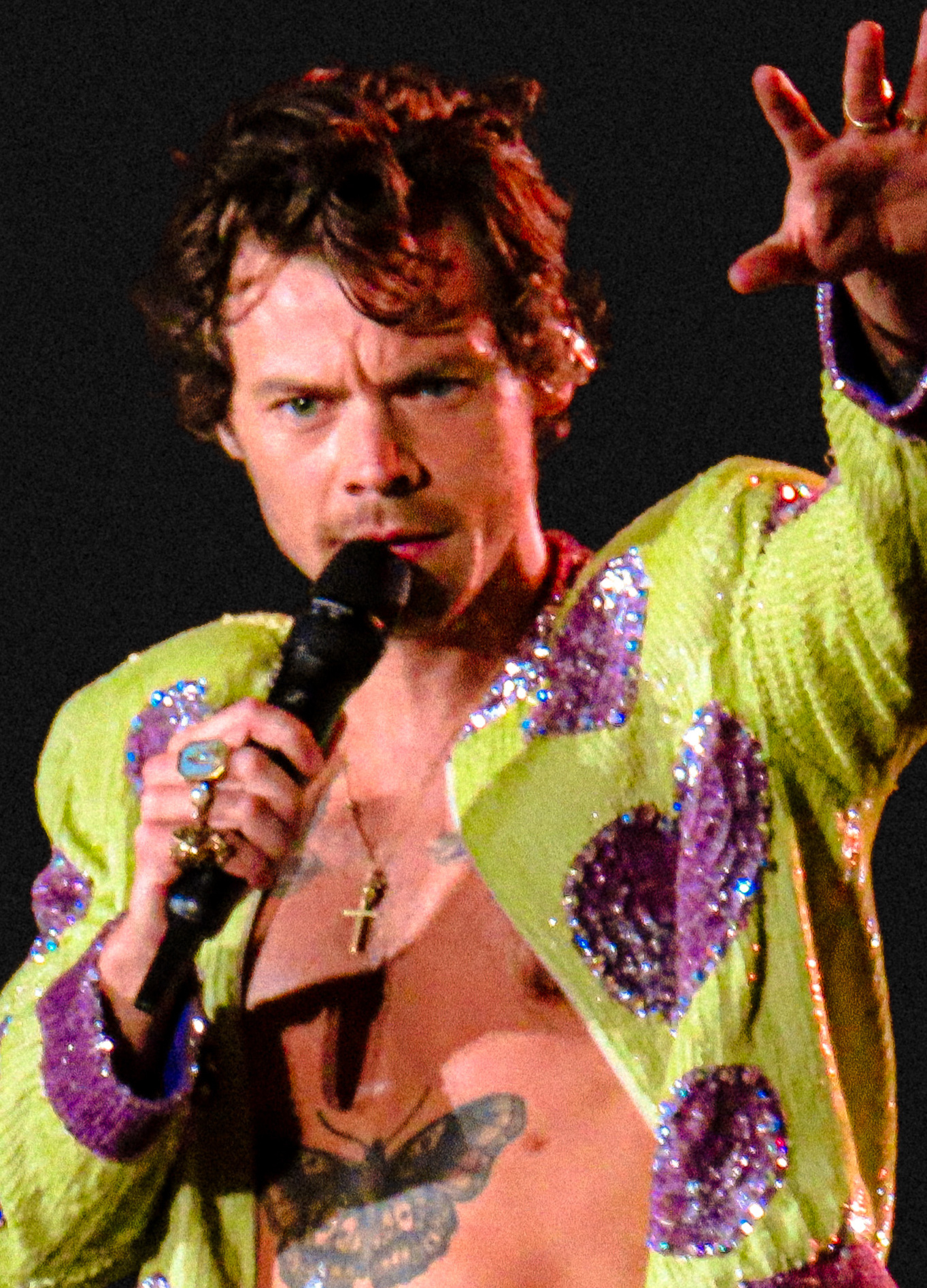
Styles on stage in Rio de Janeiro, Brazil, in 2022

English singer Harry Styles has made a significant impact on popular culture with his music, artistry, fashion, identity, tours, and commercial achievements. He is a subject of academic research and media studies, with several academic institutions providing courses about him, generally focused on concepts of gender, sexuality, globalism, consumerism, and fan culture. Styles is regarded as one of the most influential men in music and fashion, and a subject of widespread public interest with a vast fanbase.

His musical career began in 2010 as part of the boy band One Direction, which became one of the best-selling boy bands of all time before going on an indefinite hiatus in 2016. Styles has steadily amassed fame, success, and public interest throughout his career, with several media publications considering him a pop icon, a fashion icon, a global icon, and one of the most successful artists of the 21st century.

Styles has been credited for the rise in vinyl sales and has had simultaneous achievements in physical sales, digital sales, streaming, record charts, and touring. He has inspired several musicians and novelists, with Rolling Stone UK calling him the "new King of Pop" in 2022. Styles has often been described as a successor to artists such as Elton John, David Bowie, Elvis Presley, Freddie Mercury, and Michael Jackson, and one of the culture-defining figures shaping masculinity, femininity, and gender fluidity.

== Fame and stardom ==
Wax figure of Styles at Madame Tussauds Sydney

Harry Styles has been labelled one of the most influential artists by several media publications. He is one of the richest musicians in the United Kingdom, with an estimated net worth of £225 million as of 2025. Styles's musical career began in 2010 as part of the boy band One Direction, which became one of the best-selling boy bands of all time before going on an indefinite hiatus in 2016. He has released four solo studio albums, all of which were commercially successful.

Styles has been referred to as a pop icon, a fashion icon, and a global icon. He is considered to be among the most successful solo artists to have emerged from a band. Ben Beaumont-Thomas of The Guardian wrote that Styles is "a star who has negotiated one of the most difficult transitions in music – from boyband to solo artist – with more panache than even successful forebears such as Justin Timberlake and Robbie Williams". He has often been described as a successor to artists such as Elton John, David Bowie, Elvis Presley, Freddie Mercury, Michael Jackson, Prince, and Little Richard. Rolling Stone UK named Styles the "new King of Pop" in 2022. He is considered to be one of the culture-defining figures shaping masculinity, femininity, gender fluidity, and individuality through his fashion and lifestyle.

=== Identity ===
Journalists deemed Styles a cultural touchstone in redefining traditional understandings of masculinity and the perception of male musicians. Anne T. Donahue of The Guardian described him as the harbinger of the "art-throb" persona, subverting expectations of machismo and hyper-masculinity promoted by other popular male musicians like Justin Bieber and Drake. Columnist Sarah Ditum of The Times labelled Styles "the gold standard of modern sensitivity" and said he "reinvented the playboy" through his chivalry and respectful nature. Guy Pewsey, writing for Grazia, thought that his "enthusiasm for frills and flamboyance is far from superficial – it's changing what it means to be a man". Jack Michael Taylor, a journalist who studied at the University of Bangor and Liverpool John Moores University stated "Styles is integrated within popular culture as a queer icon latched to the music industry and can be used as a vessel to bring forth the media's perpetuations of being genderqueer and what it means to be a 'man'". Hannah Banks of the University of the Sunshine Coast argued "his current presentation of fluid masculinity and fashion, undefined sexuality, and political activation, seem to demonstrate an original and true self".

A study by scholars at the University of Georgia deemed Styles one of the most significant societal "nonconformists" in popular culture. Journalist Caitlin Moran considered Styles one of the contemporary public figures who are expanding ideas about masculinity and developing "a new pantheon of men". Robin Givhan of The Washington Post credited Styles for "being his singular self, at a time when people from so many corners of society are intent on telling less-advantaged folks [...] how to be and how to live. It's a small but invigorating thing to see a pop star making full use of all of the sweet liberty that comes with his territory". In a study across 102 headlines from The Independent, Josefiinao Jokela from the University of Jyväskylä found focus on Styles's actions and thoughts regarding several past or ongoing societal issues, representing him as an active feminist and a spokesperson of different minorities, with an emphasis on his vulnerable and emotional sides in several representations.

Rikke van Rossum of Uppsala University argued that the visibility of Styles's "bent masculinity" exposed the ideals of assumed heterosexuality in the mainstream, and his subversion of traditional norms highlighted the evolution of the responsibility for heterosexual male-bodied individuals to be masculine in order to reproduce and uphold society. Scholar Kate Harris believed that he contributed to altering hegemonic masculinity due to his audience size. Vicki Karaminas and Justine Taylor wrote that "maleness in the Styles persona is but an anchor point for registering the many ways that masculinities are questioned and revised" since he "ushered in a monumental shift in menswear" and has "become a muse for the gender fluidity movement". Liz Giuffre and Philip Hayward of University of Technology Sydney felt Styles's presentation and actions "offer[ed] leadership towards gender equality and diversity in the music industry that is still rare, and its consequence has positioned [him] as a relative outsider". Kirsten Zemke, senior lecturer in ethnomusicology at the University of Auckland said Styles "perform[s] gender, not sexuality". Anna A. Gornostaeva of the Moscow State Linguistic University argued that Joe Biden referencing Styles in a speech at the White House Correspondents' Association Dinner allowed Biden to position himself as a "friendlier" figure in politics, due to Styles's association with a kind, well-disposed persona and identity.

=== Fandom ===
You'd be hard pressed to find an article about Styles that doesn't mention his fans. They've sold out shows in minutes, taken over TikTok trends and camped outside venues. They're also a highly creative bunch of young people, using their fandom to learn new skills that will carry them forward in many aspects of their lives.

— Kate Pattison, The Conversation (2023)

Styles's fan base is known as "Harries", including fans of all ages, ethnicities, and genders around the world. According to researcher Kate Pattison from The Conversation, they have made fan edits of him with their video editing skills, customised fansites with their coding and web designing skills, and organised marketing campaigns to promote his music and help him win awards. In a survey of fans conducted by Pattison in 2023, the skills they have learnt through their fandom included graphic design, sewing, writing, close reading, and digital literacy. Throughout the years, Styles's fans has raised over £30,000 for charitable causes, including over £11,000 in 2021 alone in honour of his 27th birthday.

On the fan fiction website Wattpad, there are over 270,000 stories about Styles, with some of them attracting millions of readers. His popularity on the platform has sparked academic and cultural discussion due to the often harmful tropes around sexual consent and aggression contained in the works published as part of a "bad boy" persona constructed for Styles. Patrycja Biniek wrote that such fantasies allowed fans "to indulge in closeness to the idol himself, as having contact with him is impossible" and argued that "the method of exaggerating the negative qualities of the male's personality is a result of the fascination with 'the dark triad of personality traits': narcissism, Machiavellism and psychopathy". Kerra Miles of Eastern Kentucky University argued Styles's ubiquity on the platform is also part of the larger trend of "safety in fantasy" because of his kind persona.

Styles has inspired his fans to dress up for his concerts, leading Fashionista to call the shows "his fans' Met Gala". Outfits often include sequins, cowboy hats, and feather boas, with fans encouraging others to "BYOB – bring your own boa". Styles's fans have been featured in Vogue, The New York Times, and The New Yorker. The popularisation of feather boas at Styles's concerts caused a shortage of the accessory in various locations he performed in, including Dublin, Melbourne, and New York City. The feather boas at Party City in New York City were completely sold out within the first two to three days of his 15-night residency at the Madison Square Garden. Some media publications criticized Styles's fans for the environmental impact of the single-use accessory as they have polluted parts of cities after his performances. Due to his popularity, Styles has often fallen a victim of bottling, frequently hitting him in the groin.

Styles has been known for his protective relationship with his fans, stalwartly defending them in his interviews. When asked in a 2017 interview with Rolling Stone about his young female fanbase and if he is worried about proving credibility to an older crowd, he stated, "They're our future. [...] Teenage-girl fans – they don't lie. If they like you, they're there. They don't act 'too cool'. They like you, and they tell you". Publications such as Billboard, Vice, Teen Vogue, Vox, and Refinery29 praised Styles for his support. Time labelled his comment as a "powerful message about young women", and Kaitlyn Tiffany of The Guardian said he drove the "cultural change" towards respecting young women's passions for music. Jenessa Williams of the University of Leeds believed that Styles's quote has been "eulogized in contemporary fan canon" as a watershed moment where the purchasing power of fangirls became too visible for musical misogynists to ignore due to his support.

Stevie Leigh of the University of Cincinnati said "the saturated presence of women-identified fans in the Harry Styles fandom facilitated lesbian and bisexual identification" and allowed for the exploration of ideas around compulsory heterosexuality. Allyson Gross of the University of London compared the relationship of the fans with Styles to that of Ernesto Laclau's "the people" and the populist leader, who united the differences among them through an equivalential chain of signification. In a 2022 study, Janey Umback of Curtin University found that research participants unanimously agreed that their involvement in Styles's fan groups had resulted in an increased awareness of social and political inequality.

Since One Direction's early years, a group of shipping conspiracy theorist fans, often called "Larries", have been dedicated to proving that Styles and Louis Tomlinson, name blended as "Larry Stylinson", are secretly a couple that has been closeted by a homophobic music industry. In 2016, Vox's Aja Romano deemed the group "one of the largest elements of the One Direction fandom, which itself is one of the largest fandoms on the internet". Academics Clare Southerton and Hannah McCann connected them to phenomena like queer reading and slash fiction. The theory, mainly proliferated on social media, has led to online bullying and harassment of Styles's and Tomlinson's friends, family, and partners.

=== Social media presence ===
Styles is one of the most-followed Twitter users, with over 38 million followers as of 2022, and has one of the most-followed Instagram accounts in the United Kingdom, with over 48 million followers as of 2024. He has often used his social media accounts to interact with his fans, reply to their posts, or answer their private messages. When a fan jokingly tweeted on the 2019 World Mental Health Day that Styles's second album and tour were more important than therapy, he answered, "Go to therapy, it's important. I'll wait for you". Styles was named the most influential person on Twitter by The Independent in 2015 and ranked as the tenth most famous contemporary music artist by YouGov in 2024.

Styles was the second-most-searched artist on Google in 2022. According to a report released in 2022 by Twitter called "The Styles Report", he was the most-talked-about "Harry" of the 2020s, surpassing both Harry Potter and Prince Harry. His fans tweeted about his third studio album, Harry's House, over 10 million tweets from its announcement date to its release date, with a five times increase in tweets about feather boas during the week of the 63rd Annual Grammy Awards. Additionally, Twitter painted murals of popular tweets about Styles in Los Angeles and New York City, while Kevin O'Donnell, Twitter's head of music partnerships, spoke about Styles's influence in a press release. In a study conducted by academics Sylvia Jaworska, Michael K. Goodman, and Iwona Gibas from the University of Reading, Styles had the highest magnitude, salience, and reach per tweet than any other account on Twitter, including Donald Trump and Elon Musk, in terms of individual tweets about the COVID-19 pandemic.

=== Legacy ===
Senior artists such as Paul McCartney, Joni Mitchell, Rick Astley, Stevie Nicks, Elton John, and Shania Twain have praised Styles's musicianship. Nicks regards him as "the son [she] never had", "[her] little muse", and a "love child" between her and Mick Fleetwood. Fleetwood shared this assessment, saying Styles has "the real shit in him" and joking that he adopted Styles. Neil Tennant of the Pet Shop Boys praised Styles for his album sequencing and taking risks as a mainstream pop star, Liam Gallagher dubbed him "marvellous" and "very talented", Nick Mason of Pink Floyd asked if he could play drums for Styles, and Jon Bon Jovi labelled him as "one-of-one" and "the real deal".

== Touring ==
Styles has been revered by critics and journalists for his unique performing style and sense of inclusivity while touring. According to Billboard, tickets for the Harry Styles: Live on Tour shows in 2017 sold out in seconds across 29 markets. The tour grossed over $63 million and raised a total of $1.2 million in charity donations from ticket and merchandise sales for 62 charities around the world, and registered hundreds of new voters in the United States via the non-profit organisation HeadCount. The second of the two final shows at the Kia Forum tallied more than 17,000 paid tickets and beat the record for the most paid tickets for a single show since the venue reopened in 2014. Additionally, record amounts of merchandise were sold in over 50 venues in North and South America, Australia, and Europe, according to Live Nation Entertainment.

Styles's Love On Tour (2021–2023) grossed $617.3 million and sold more than 5 million tickets over 173 dates. It ended as the fifth-highest-grossing tour and eighth-most attended tour of all time, and raised more than $6.5 million for various charities including Planned Parenthood, Choose Love, and Physicians for Reproductive Health. More than 30,000 people responded to the call to action within hours of announcing Styles's partnership with Everytown for Gun Safety, and nearly 55,000 new voters registered with Headcount due to his partnership, breaking the organization's record for highest registration. The tour eclipsed the entire career gross of One Direction's tours combined. The tour was also credited by Hugh McIntyre of Forbes as "one of the first major ventures by a top-tier musician following the global pandemic", and Michael Hann, writing for The Guardian, considered Styles one of the first major artists to adapt their tours to the restrictions of the outbreak of the COVID-19 pandemic.

=== Inclusivity ===
It strikes me as significant that this is one of the few shows I've ever been to where I've not felt threatened by anyone in the room. [...] It's because Harry Styles supports his fans' politics while they really live it, and as a result, his shows have become a place for people to celebrate being whoever they are. The diversity of the room itself speaks to that. He's cheering just as much for his fans as they are for him.

— Emma Garland on Styles's shows, Vice (2017)

Several publications have praised Styles for his inclusivity and welcoming attitude at his concerts. They lauded him for encouraging his fans to be "whoever they want to be" and have "the best time of their lives" at his shows. Will Richards of the Evening Standard said of the environment, "To foster such a safe space for people to be so unashamedly themselves [is] Styles's greatest feat". Olivia Ovenden of GQ noted his appreciation for diversity at shows has directly challenged contemporary culture wars, adding that his "repeated signposting of his concerts as a place of progressivism has served as a powerful antidote to the ongoing culture wars around identity politics". This was echoed by Kelly Given of The National after Styles performed in Edinburgh, "Styles embodies the very values that Scotland was built on and his influence transcends beyond entertainment, inspiring fans to be true to themselves, challenge societal norms, and contribute positively to society". Janey Umback of the University of Iowa labelled his tours as "an entirely immersive experience" where a "symbolic transformation occurs" as fans can engage socially and politically with each other. Emma Garland ofVice positioned his shows as "inherently political" due to the level of inclusivity and celebration of diversity with his fans and argued the dynamic is unique in the landscape for male popstars. Some publications, such as Billboard and Clash, compared the fervour observed at Styles's concerts to the heights of Elvis Presley and Beatlemania.

=== Residencies ===
As part of Love On Tour in 2021, Styles announced a 15-night residency at both Madison Square Garden and the Kia Forum, with additional 6-night residencies in Chicago and Austin, Texas. Multiple publications cited him as the leader in a new trend of live entertainment for performers in a post-COVID-19 landscape and a method to reduce touring costs. Ben Sisario of The New York Times named him "the most prominent example of a bubbling trend", with Eamonn Forde of The Guardian agreeing that he led the pack due to his large scale success. Former chief executive of Ticketmaster, Nathan Hubbard, deemed Styles's strategy "the future of live [entertainment]".

Styles's shows at Madison Square Garden were the highest grossing engagement for a British artist, for a male artist, the biggest for any artist at the venue, and the highest grossing headline engagement in Billboard boxscore's history. The Garden raised a permanent banner to the rafters in the venue for his record-setting run of 15 consecutive sold-out shows, making Styles the third artist in history to receive the accolade. Jim Dolan, executive chairman and CEO of MSG Entertainment, named Styles one of the most impactful artists of his generation due to his new live entertainment model. Styles also received a commemorative banner for his 15 sold-out shows at the Kia Forum, becoming the first to receive the honor.

=== Sustainability ===
Styles is considered one of the leading contemporary artists promoting sustainability in live entertainment. He launched a partnership with the non-profit organization Reverb in 2018 for his Harry Styles: Live on Tour shows. On his first tour, 6,700 gallons of waste were diverted from landfills backstage by his band and crew. As part of Love On Tour, "Harry Styles Eco-Village" was set up at every show, where 33,900+ single-use bottles were eliminated. Styles also supported The Kenya Clean Water Project, The Sky Wind Project, and Solar Powered Streetlights in Michigan to address the greenhouse gas emissions from the tour. In 2022, the partnership was highlighted by Billboard as one of the major contributors to the "green movement" in live music. The Washington Post considered Styles one of the first major artists to make climate pledges on their tours.

Styles also invested in Co-op Live, the United Kingdom's first 100% electric arena, powered by a combination of renewably sourced electricity and on-site solar panels. The venue's roof harvests rainfall, which is used to water its plants and flush its toilets. The venue pledges zero waste to landfill and the intention to be the most sustainable arena in Europe. In 2024, Styles's representatives joined the Music Climate Advisory Committee for a study at the Massachusetts Institute of Technology's Environmental Solutions Initiative, proposing sustainable solutions for the live music events.

== Commercial success ==
As a result of the anticipation for his albums, Styles has impacted the music industry's economy on several occasions. Sony Music Group considered Harry's House a major seller for their third fiscal quarter of 2022, when the company experienced record earnings and a 42.9% year-on-year growth in music publishing revenue. In 2022, Harry's House was listed among the key contributors to an increase of cassette sales in the United Kingdom, the highest level since 2003. Styles has also been credited for the rise in vinyl sales in both the United Kingdom and the United States, for a 20% year-on-year industry increase. His second studio album, Fine Line, was the best-selling vinyl album in the United States in 2020.

=== British export ===
The British Phonographic Industry credited Styles's global success with boosting music exports to the United Kingdom several times. The Guardian deemed him "Britain's most lucrative export" with his broad international appeal, with The Daily Telegraph labelling him "Britain's premier contemporary pop star" who is "single-handedly keeping Britain relevant on the world stage". Will Page and Chris Dalla Riva of the London School of Economics wrote that despite the "glocalisation" in the music industry, Styles is still a "very British success story". Following the release of Harry's House and its lead single, "As It Was", in 2022, the United Kingdom saw its highest annual export level since 2000. It led to a double-digit percentage increase in physical sales, digital sales, streaming, and other consumption of British music in every region globally. Styles was credited with helping to lift the United Kingdom's live music industry to record heights in 2023, generating £8 billion ($10.3 billion) for the country's economy and encouraging more than 18 million British fans to travel across the country to see acts like him in concert.

Styles's debut studio album, Harry Styles, earned the biggest sales week for a debut album by a British male in the SoundScan era, while Harry's House moved more vinyl copies than any other artist since SoundScan's tracking began. During Harry's House's release week, Styles occupied the top spot of the album and singles charts in over 15 countries, including the United Kingdom and United States, with Harry's House and "As It Was". In the United States, "As It Was" became the longest running number one song by a British act in the Billboard Hot 100's history, and Harry's House's first week on the Billboard 200 chart became the biggest first week for any British male artist. In 2022, "As It Was" was the best-selling song and Harry's House was the best-selling album in the United Kingdom. Styles also holds the record as the first English male artist to debut at number one on the Billboard 200 with his first three albums. He has also broken several records in Asia, Europe, and Latin America with his tours.

Styles has been particularly praised for "breaking the boyband mould" as a solo artist and "cracking America". James Masterton of The Guardian labelled him a "new kind of cross-media poly-talent" across generations, calling him a "renaissance man" for expression and fluidity in British stars. Styles became the first British male soloist to win Album of the Year at the Grammy Awards since Eric Clapton and the first to win the award after originating from reality television. In 2020, He was named Variety's Hitmaker of the Year.

=== Streaming ===
Styles is one of the biggest artists on Spotify, with over 74.7 million monthly listeners as of 2022. In 2022, "As It Was" was the most-streamed song of the year both in the United Kingdom and globally on Spotify, the most-streamed song globally on Deezer, the second-most-streamed song globally on Apple Music, and the most-streamed song in the United Kingdom overall. On its release day, it became the most-streamed song in a single day by a male artist on Spotify, with over 16 million streams. In February 2024, "As It Was" became the sixth song in Spotify's history to surpass three billion streams. Andre Paine of Music Week called Fine Line a "streaming phenomenon", stating that Harry's House outperformed Fine Line's first five weeks in the United Kingdom by 200% in terms of streaming consumption. On Spotify, Harry's House was the most-streamed album in the United Kingdom and the second-most-streamed album globally in 2022, and the tenth-most-streamed album globally in 2023.

=== Marketing strategies ===
They're incredibly smart, they're brilliant in the way they pieced it all together. [...] In this day and age when there is so much out there, getting people to pay attention to one thing is really satisfying.

— Manos Xanthogeorgis, Columbia Records' senior vice president of digital marketing and media, on Styles's fans and the Eroda campaign, Billboard (2019)

Styles's brand is considered "a professional, consistent and emotional presence" with "elaborate" and "lavish" marketing campaigns. To promote Fine Line and its lead single, "Lights Up", in 2019, Styles launched the "Do You Know Who You Are?" campaign, in which a generative website was created and several billboards were displayed around the world with a lyric from the single. He later launched the "Eroda" campaign to promote the album's release and its second single, "Adore You" (2019). Styles created a fictional island called Eroda and marketed it for a tourism agency on the island, as well as a website, fake reviews on social media apps, travel tips, and short history lessons about the island. He later collaborated with Spotify to organize a fan-exclusive event held at an undisclosed location in Los Angeles for a private listening party, where fans were taken to experience Eroda. Gil Kaufman of Billboard called the Eroda campaign the most viral marketing campaign of the year. Alice Vincent of The Daily Telegraph praised Styles for his creativity, stating, "Styles is closing out the 2010s with the greatest album campaign we've seen so far". In 2020, Styles won the Silver Clio Award in the "Music Marketing" category for the Eroda campaign.

To celebrate Fine Line's release and maximize the album's sales, Styles held a one-night-only show at the Kia Forum on the album's release day. He allowed fans to pre-order his album and rewarded them with a code to have a chance to buy tickets for the show for $25. Styles has also held several shows during Halloween throughout the years, dubbing the shows "Harryween", and encouraging the fans to dress up in costumes for the occasion. Tickets for his Halloween shows sell out in seconds, with fans spending hundreds and thousands of dollars on resale tickets.

As part of Harry's House's promotion, Columbia Records launched the "You Are Home" campaign with a website with the same phrase. Users found an image of a door on the site, opening to changing visual patterns. Each change behind the door was accompanied by a tweet from the Twitter account @YouAreHome. Fans found that the website's coding pointed them to the coordinates of newspaper offices and billboards around the world, where advertisements for the campaign were placed. Once the album was announced, the door on the site opened to the official album artwork. Stock photo agency Shutterstock reported that when the campaign launched, "Doors" and "Houses" saw their clickability surge 145% and 42%, respectively. Brands such as Hulu, Samsung, Twix, Adobe, Sporting Lisbon CP, and Architectural Digest also parodied the album artwork and participated in the campaign. In 2024, Styles and Columbia Records won the Clio Grand in the "Album Launch/Artist Promotion Integrated Campaign" category for their achievement with Harry's House. Amanda O'Shaughnessy, an associate marketing director at Mediacom, said Styles "knows who he is and what he stands for but most importantly he understands his audience and what they want. [...] He embraces and shows unending respect to his fans, audiences, and generations, ensuring they're represented. He's even on several occasions shut down the pigeon-holing of his fans by journalists – truly appreciating how his audiences continue to evolve. That takes humility which marketers can all learn from".

== Fashion ==
It's hard to go anywhere without encountering Harry Styles' unparalleled, experimental, and often '70's-inspired fashion sense. Whether someone is most familiar with Styles' boy-band-cutie era or as an innovator in modern menswear, one can definitively say that the musician often lives up to his surname.

— Alfonso J. Godinez Aguilar, The Harvard Crimson (2021)

Styles has been labelled a fashion icon and as one of the most influential males in fashion by journalists and other sectors of the entertainment industry. His influence on fashion has been examined by critics and designers. Styles has had several ventures into the fashion industry, including owning lifestyle and fashion brand Pleasing, creating his own collection for Gucci, investing in brands like S.S. Daley, and appearing at events such as the Met Gala and the Fashion Awards. He has set various fashion trends throughout his career, and aspects of his looks and clothing have influenced the public, designers, and other entertainers. Andrew Groves, director of the University of Westminster menswear archive, described the triumvirate of Styles, S.S. Daley, and Styles's stylist, Harry Lambert, as an "interesting dynamic with each of them allowing the others to use fashion and dress as a means of shifting the cultural norms around menswear". On Styles's "Gucci Ha Ha Ha" collection, Nataša Djurić of SUPSI wrote "the collaboration with Styles was [...] an exploration of fashion and identity, embracing the concept of expressive freedom, and challenging the canons of traditional men's fashion".

Styles is credited for creating trends in fashion with pearl necklaces, Hawaiian shirts, crochet garments, Chelsea boots, and wide-leg trousers. Jacob Gallagher of The Wall Street Journal called him the "popularizer of the manly pearl necklace" and Tom Lamont of The Guardian noted that some of his fashion choices have contributed to "an important political discussion about gendered fashion". Elements of Styles's personal belongings and famous looks have been displayed in museums and exhibitions around the world, including the Design Museum, the Grammy Museum at L.A. Live, the Rock and Roll Hall of Fame, and the Victoria and Albert Museum. He has also received various awards for his fashion, including the British Style Award at the 2013 Fashion Awards.

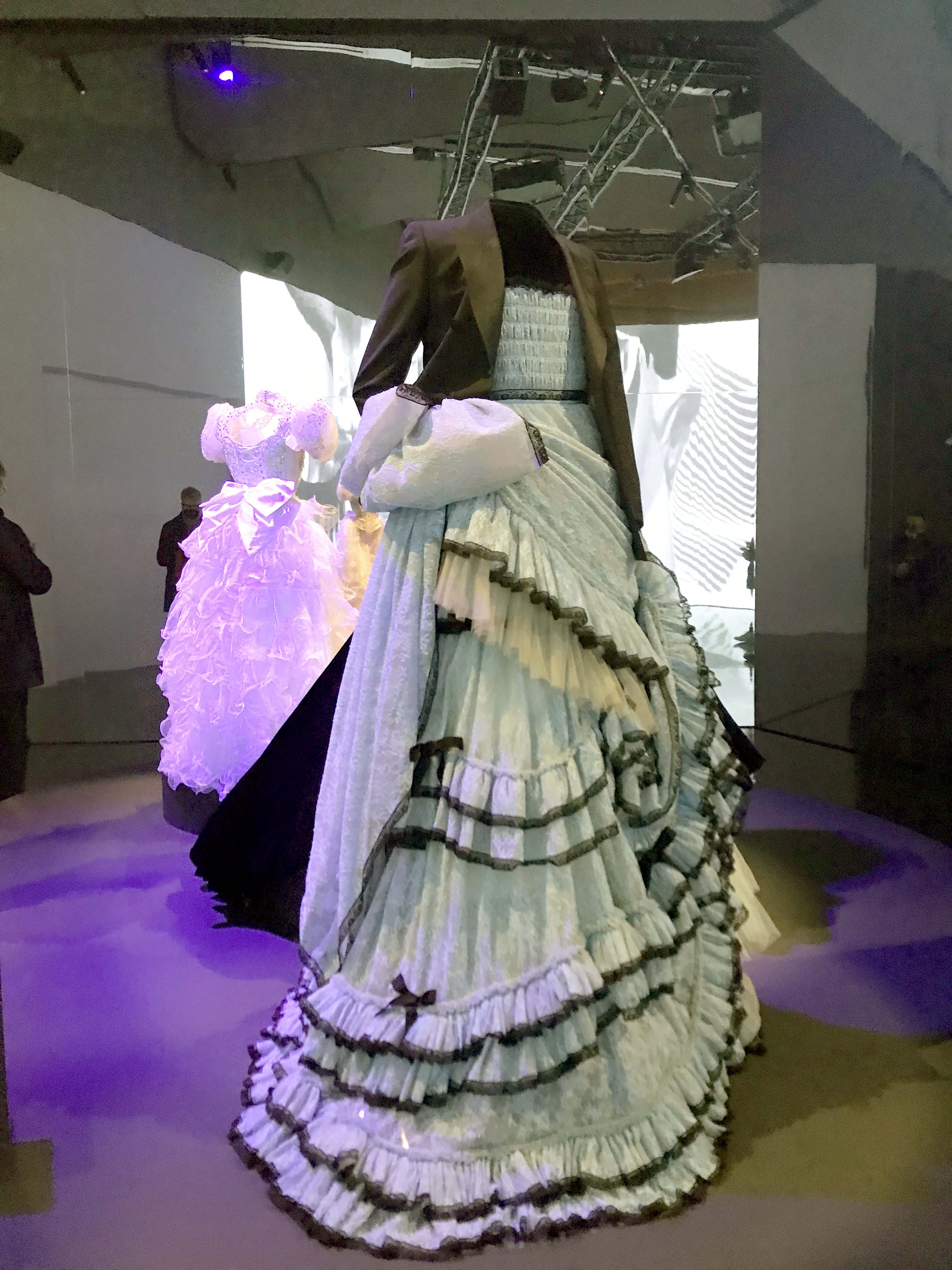
Blue Gucci dress worn by Styles on the cover of Vogue on display at the Victoria and Albert Museum in 2022

In 2020, Styles became the first man to appear solo on the cover of Vogue, selling 40,000 subscriptions after the cover was launched; they had to order a second print run with a waitlist. The blue Gucci dress he wore on the Vogue cover was incorporated in 2022 into a Victoria and Albert Museum exhibit called Fashioning Masculinities: The Art of Menswear. Nian Liu noted the inclusion of the dress in the exhibition "enhance[s] the promotion of fashion to the general public but also contributes to the establishment of the museum's own brand". Nashville-based singer Charlotte Sands wrote a song called "Dress", inspired by Styles's cover look. The song went viral on TikTok and has been added to over 37,000 Spotify playlists as of 2021.

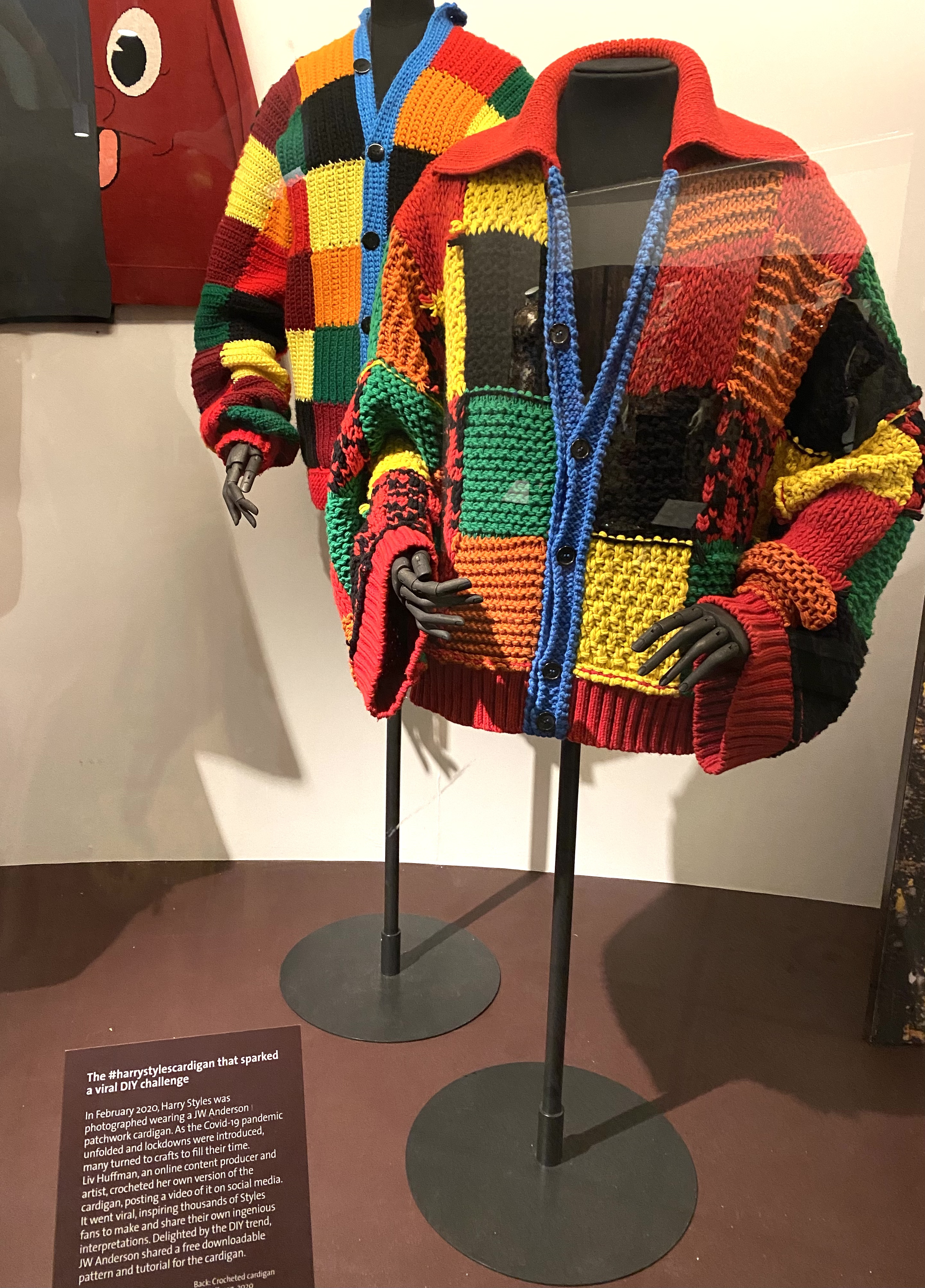
JW Anderson cardigan worn by Styles during rehearsal for The Today Show on display at the Victoria and Albert Museum

During the COVID-19 lockdowns in 2020, a JW Anderson knitted cardigan that Styles wore in a rehearsal for The Today Show went viral on TikTok as Anderson provided the pattern for free online. The Victoria and Albert Museum acquired the cardigan for its permanent collection in November 2020, calling the viral craze a "cultural phenomenon that speaks to the power of creativity and social media in bringing people together in times of extreme adversity". Following the internet challenge to recreate the cardigan on TikTok, searches for knitted clothes increased by 166% during the last week of June, according to fashion technology company and search engine Lyst.

Lyst named Styles the most influential man in fashion in 2020 and a "trendsetter" of the year. They pointed out that after the release of the music video for Styles's single "Golden" in 2020, internet searches for yellow bucket hats increased by 92%, for turquoise blue blazers by 52%, and for Bode, the fashion brand of Styles's shirt, by 31%. During the first 24 hours after the release of the music video for "Watermelon Sugar", searches for watermelons increased by 11% and Hawaiian shirts by 16%. After wearing a custom sparkling Gucci suit for the music video for "Treat People with Kindness", the demand for Gucci increased by 23% at the week of the release with a 426% surge in searches for sequins, while searches for white wide-leg trousers increased by 40%. Following the release of the music video for "As It Was", searches for jumpsuits increased by a massive 212% during its release week. In September 2022, when Styles started his Love On Tour, online styling service Stitch Fix saw a 160% year-over-year spike in requests related to the tour and Styles's looks. The week after the 63rd Annual Grammy Awards, financial technology company Klarna reported a 29% increase of purchases of leather suits.

Styles placed fourth on British GQ's 2018 list of 50 best-dressed men, with fashion designer Michael Kors calling him "the modern embodiment of British rocker style: edgy, flamboyant and worn with unapologetic swagger". The magazine also named him the best-dressed musician in the world. Styles was also ranked first and fifth on British Vogue's "The 50 Fittest Boys" list in 2016 and 2017, respectively, and was voted the "Sexiest Male in Pop" for three consecutive years between 2016 and 2018 in a poll by British radio network Capital. In 2020, he was voted GQ's "Most Stylish Man of the Year". Styles was inducted as part of Business of Fashion's Class of 2022, a definitive index of people shaping the global fashion industry. In 2023, he was credited alongside Beyoncé and Taylor Swift for the rise in elaborate concert dressing, emulating fan culture of the 1960s. He was also named one of the best-dressed men on the planet by Glamour in 2023.

== Creative inspiration ==
=== Inspiration on other artists ===
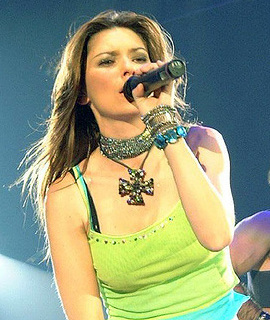
Shania Twain

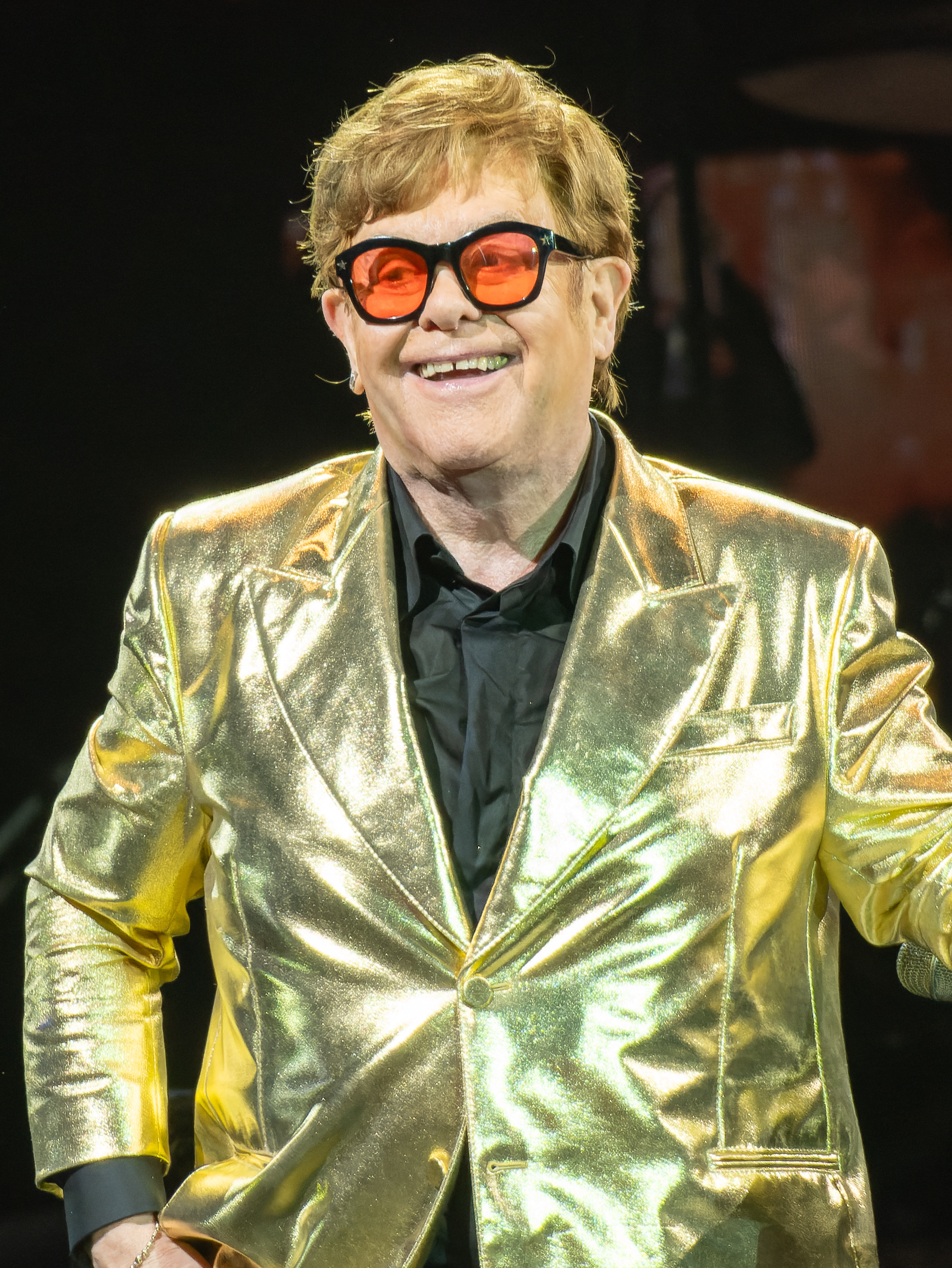
Elton John

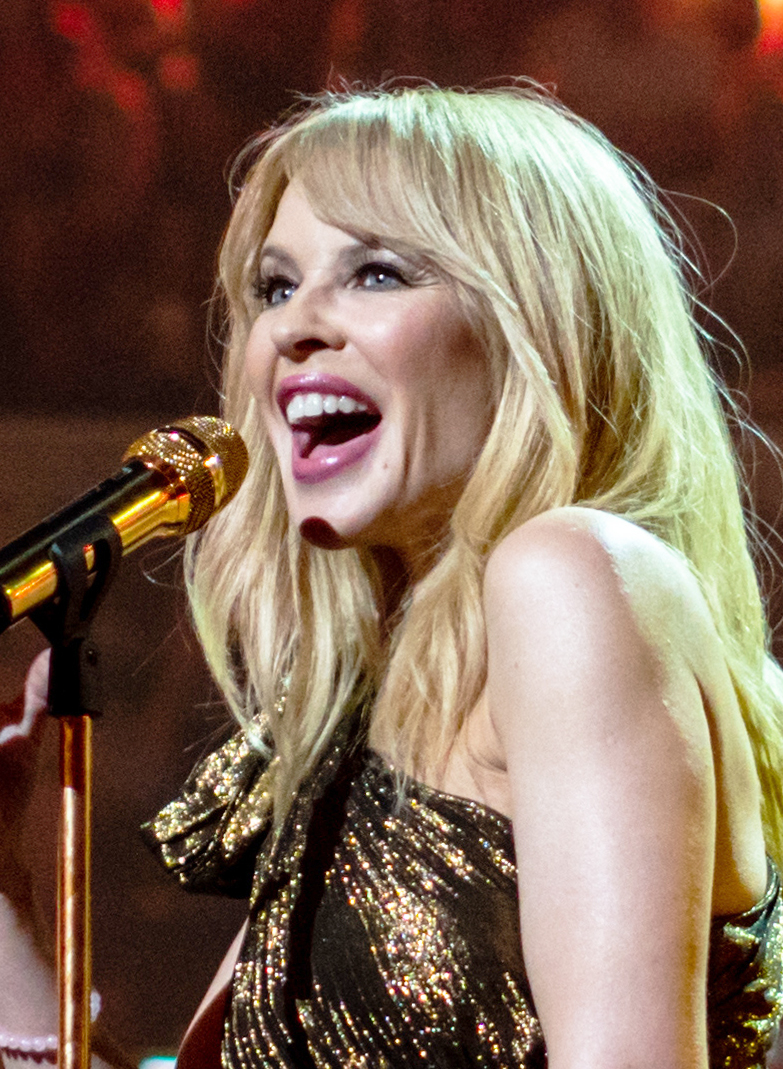
Kylie Minogue

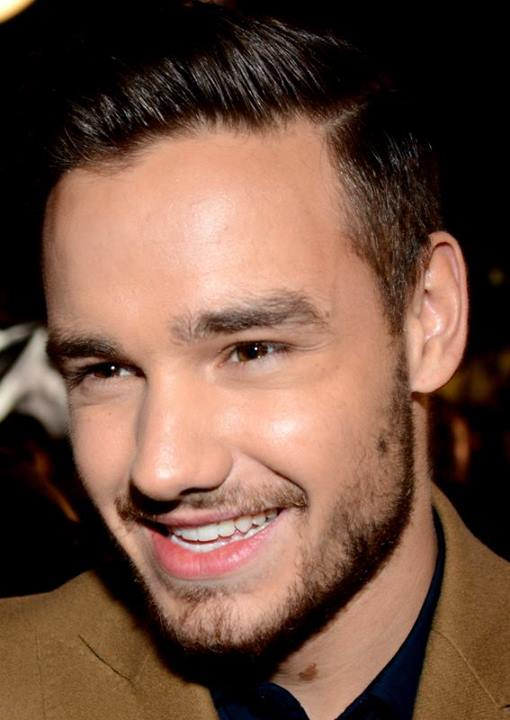
Liam Payne

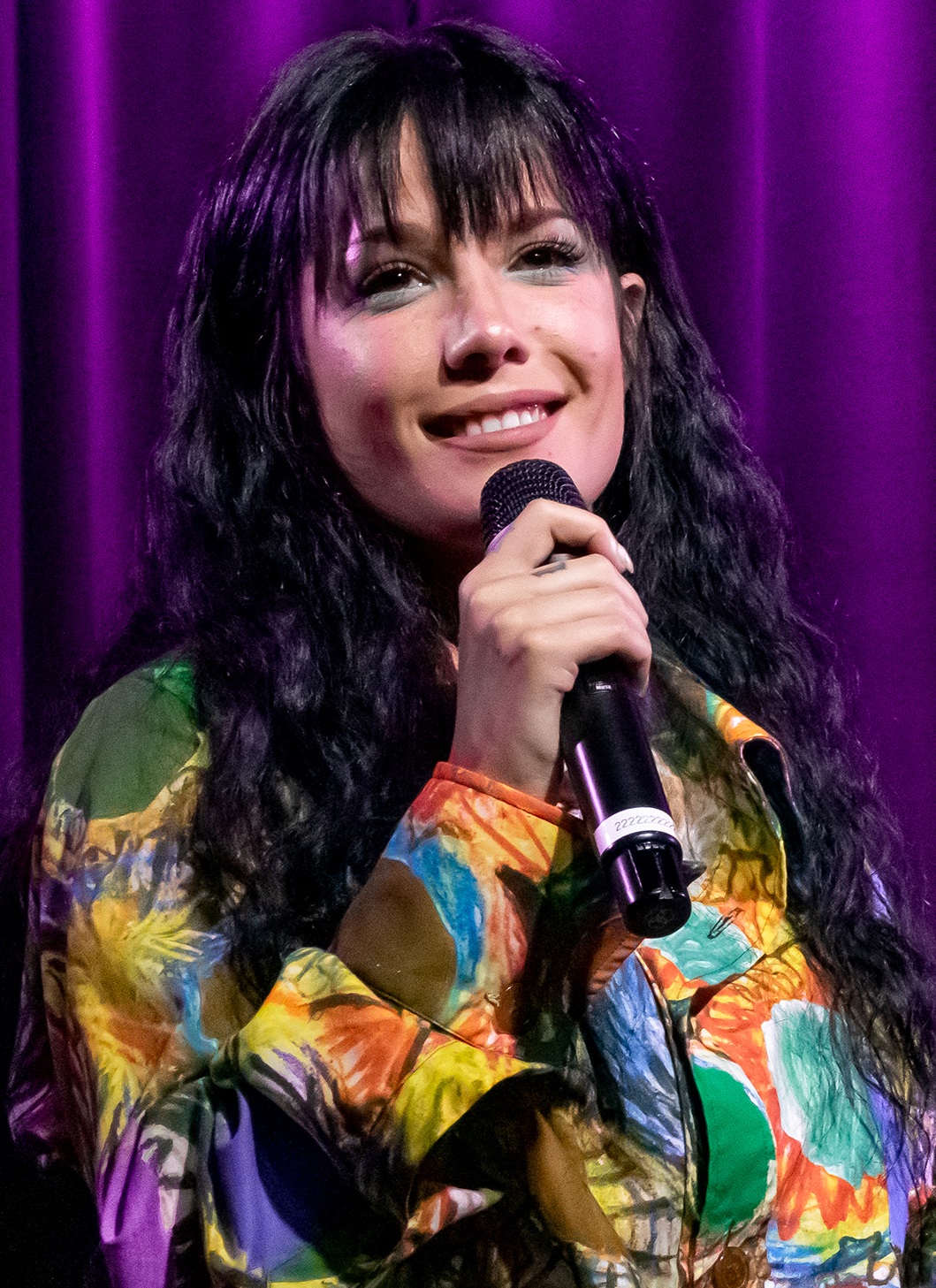
Halsey

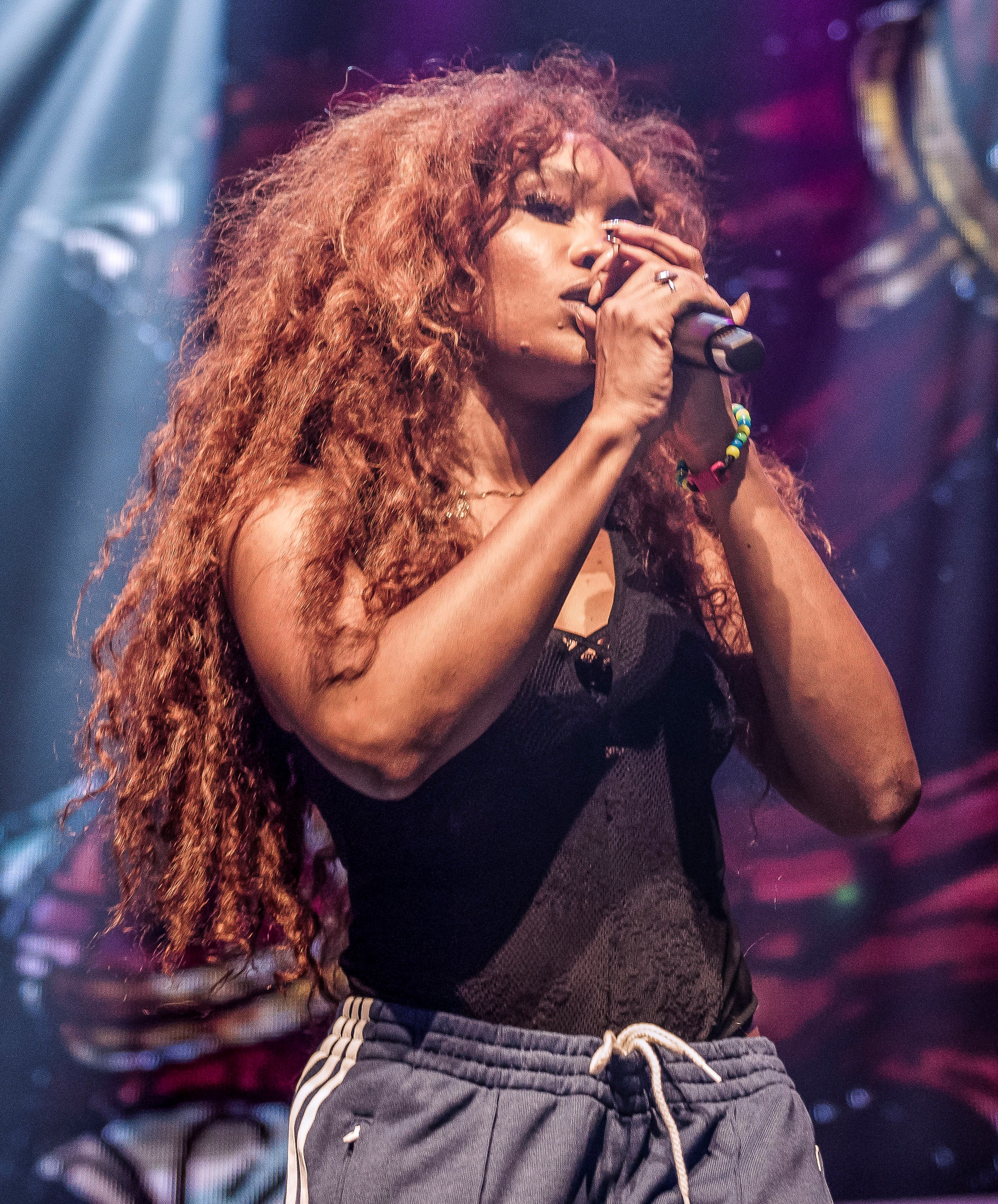
SZA

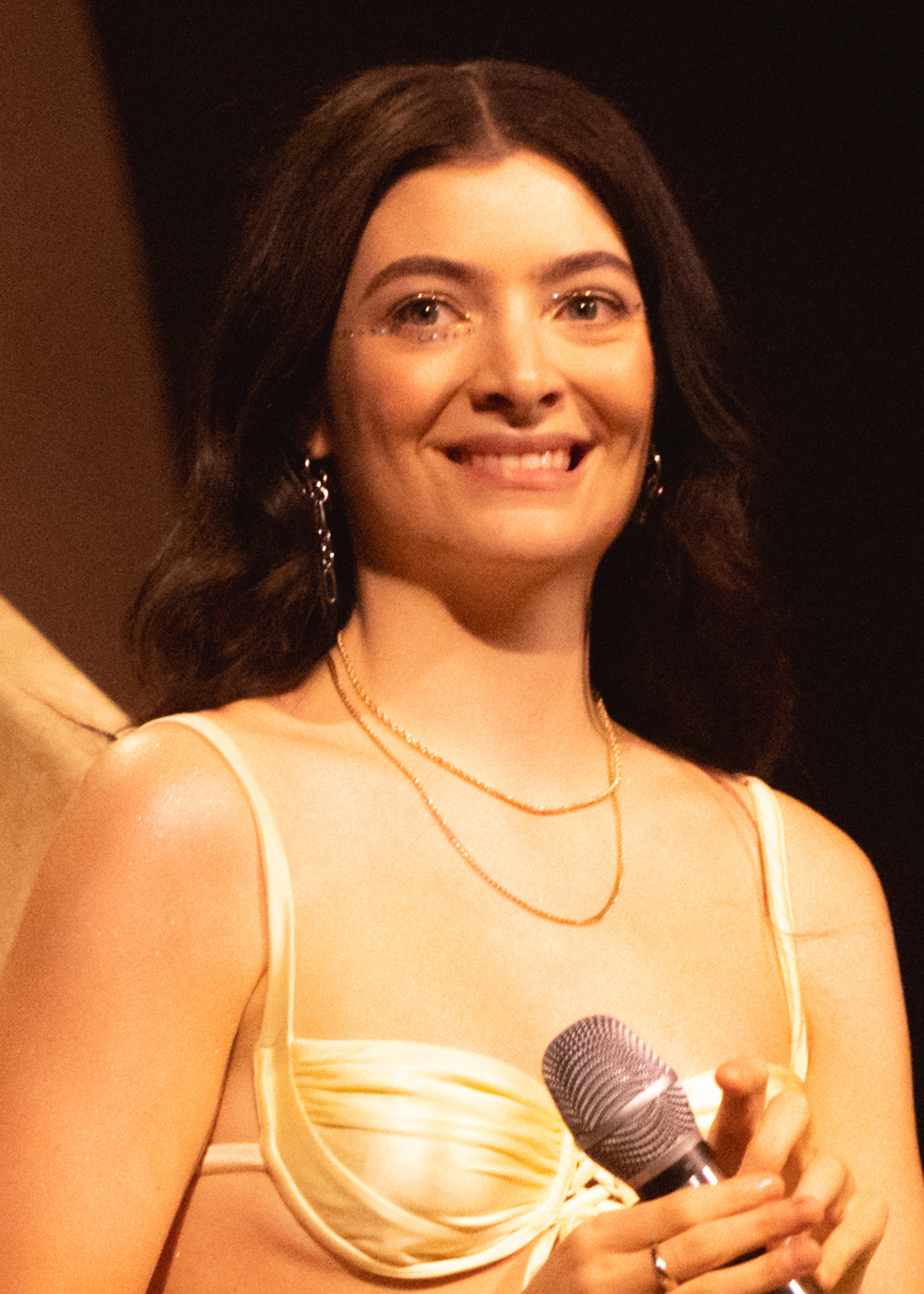
Lorde

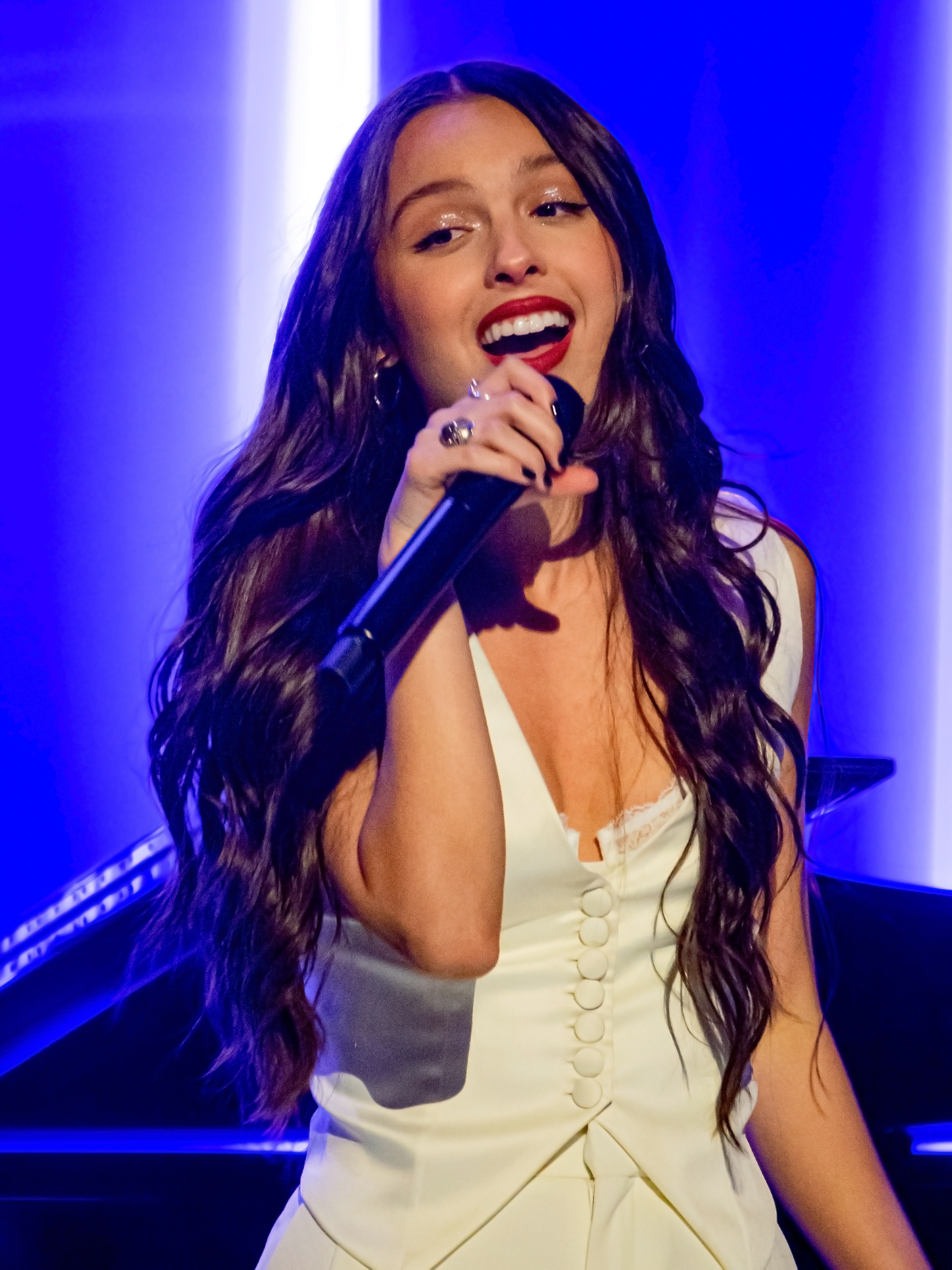
Olivia Rodrigo

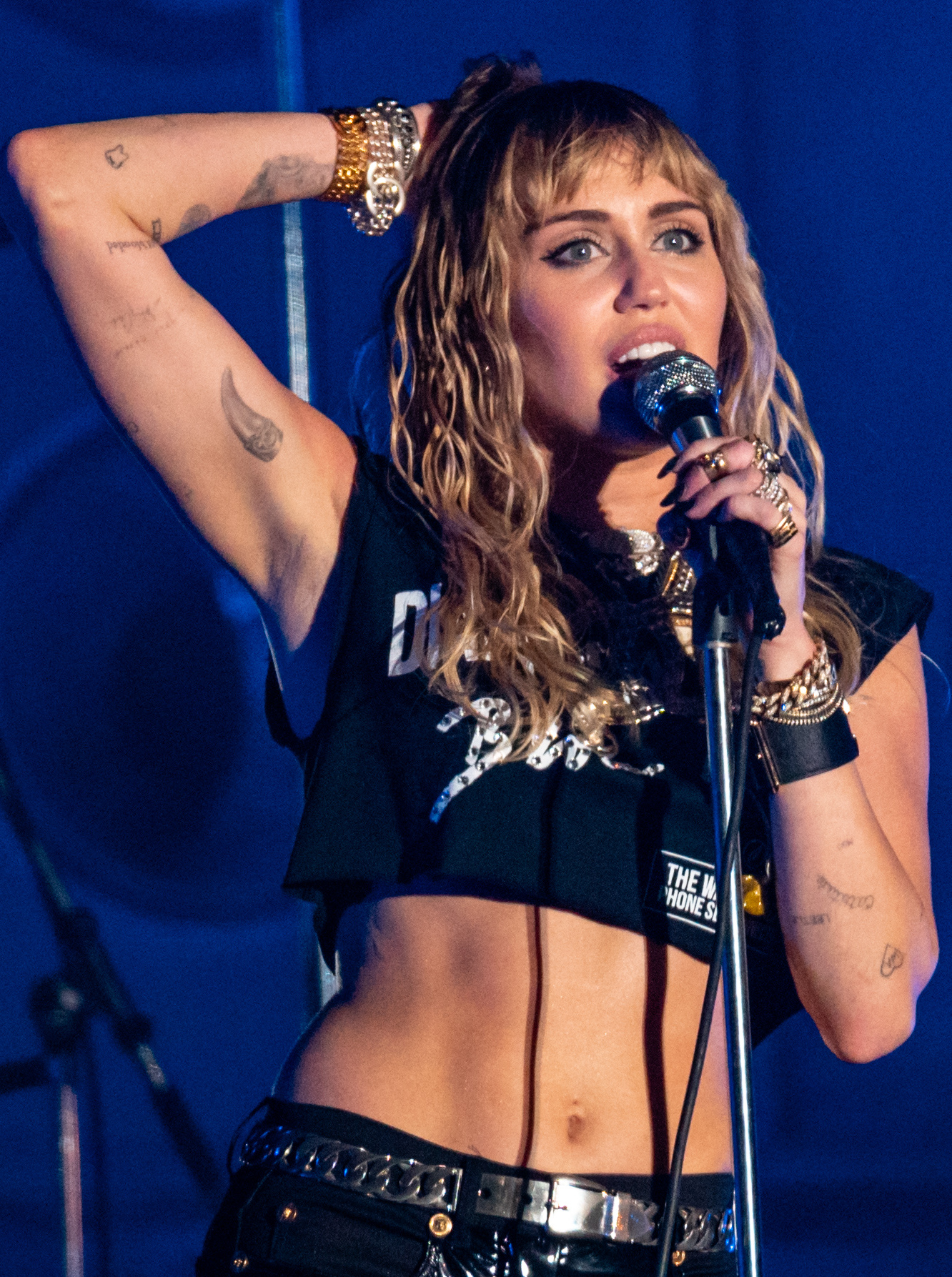
Miley Cyrus

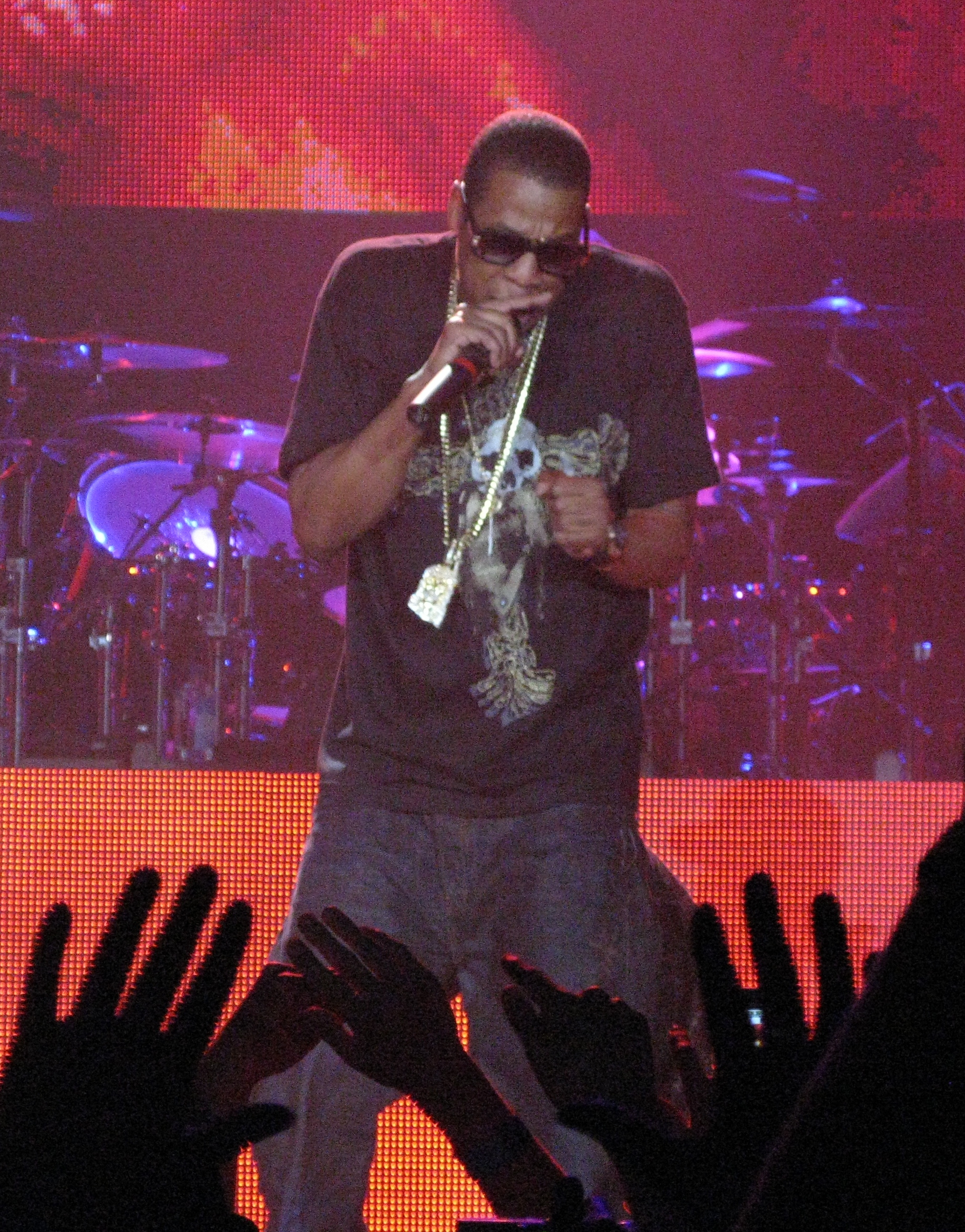
Jay-Z

Several artists have voiced their desires to work with Styles, including those pictured above.

Many musicians have expressed getting inspiration from Styles and their desire to work with him. Singer-songwriter Stevie Nicks likened Fine Line to Fleetwood Mac's album Rumours (1977), saying that she was inspired by him to write new music and poetry. Other acts who cited Styles as an influence and voiced their desires to work with him include:

- Aitch
- Aespa
- Ashe
- Clean Bandit
- Gary Barlow
- Joshua Bassett
- Miley Cyrus
- Davido
- Hilary Duff
- Grupo Firme
- Tom Grennan
- Halsey
- Sophie B. Hawkins
- Matty Healy
- Ella Henderson
- Kacy Hill
- Nick Hodgson
- ATL Jacob
- Jay-Z
- Elton John
- Joe Jonas
- Kelsy Karter
- Anthony Kiedis
- Kihyun
- Kodaline
- Lady Blackbird
- John Legend
- Lorde
- Olivia Lunny
- Måneskin
- Kylie Minogue
- Rita Ora
- Liam Payne
- Leigh-Anne Pinnock
- Olivia Rodrigo
- Mark Ronson
- Calum Scott
- Seori
- Troye Sivan
- Chris Stapleton
- Morgane Stapleton
- SZA
- Ryan Tedder
- Meghan Trainor
- Shania Twain
- Winter
- Monsta X
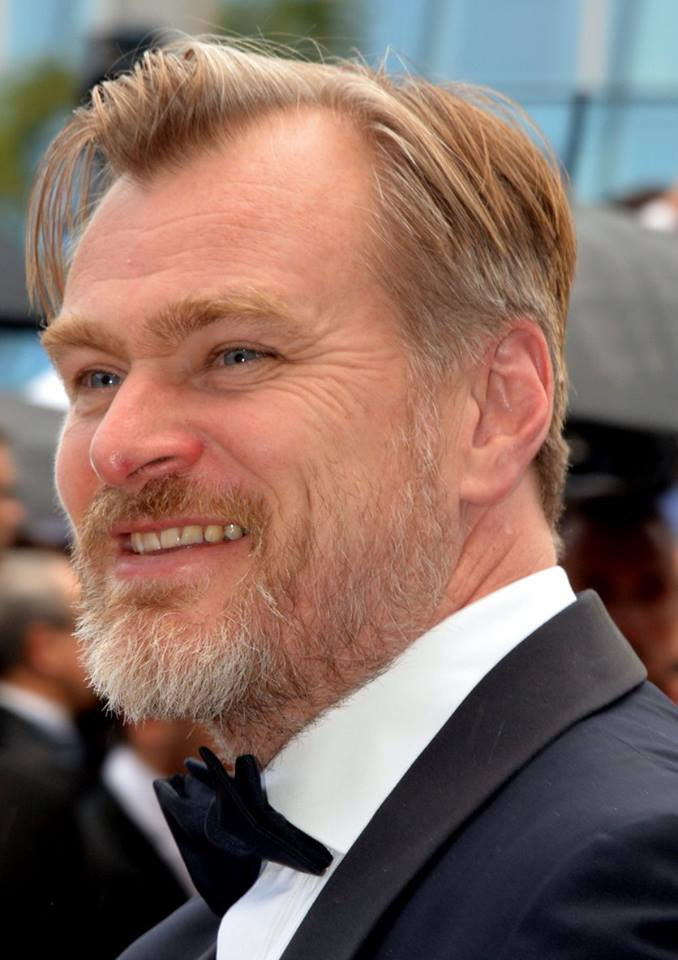
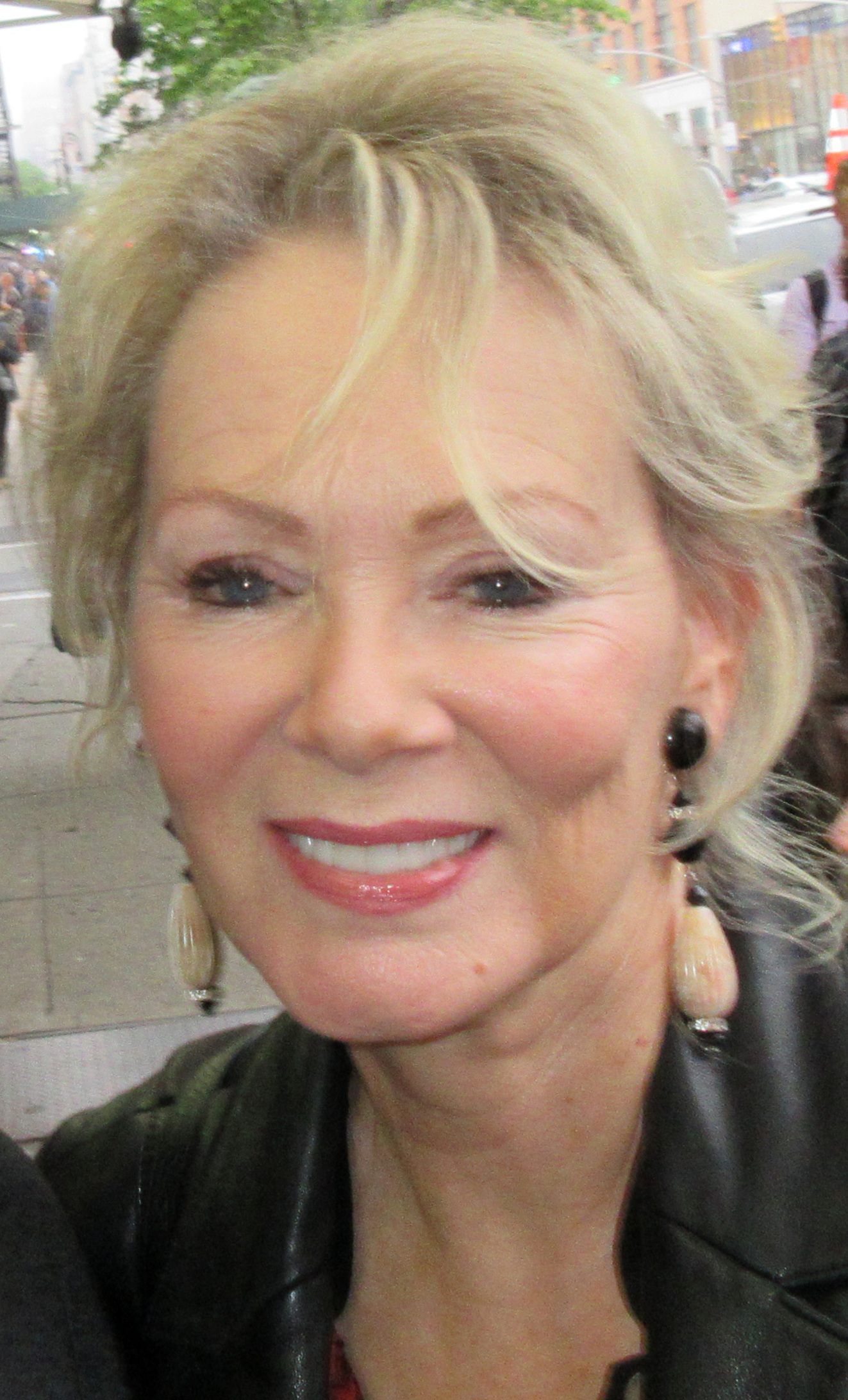
Several actors and filmmakers stated their desires to work with Styles, including Christopher Nolan (left) and Jean Smart (right)

Actress Jean Smart praised Styles's stage performance and personality, and stated her desire to work with him. Jennifer Grey also revealed that she would love to work with Styles on the sequel to her romantic drama dance film Dirty Dancing (1987). Director Christopher Nolan admitted his desire to work with Styles again, having worked together on the historical war thriller film Dunkirk (2017). When asked about working with Styles on Dunkirk, actor Cillian Murphy stated, "He is a sweet kid, he wears [his fame] lightly. I admire how he comports himself".

Novels inspired by Styles include the After series, Grace and the Fever, and The Idea of You. The After novels were turned into a film series, with Anne Hathaway and Nicholas Galitzine starring in the romantic comedy film The Idea of You (2024), an adaption of the novel. Styles has been featured as part of several children's books, such as Penguin Random House's Tiny Idols: A Baby's First Biography and Little Golden Books books, and the Have You Heard of? series.

=== Covers and mentions ===
Many musicians worldwide have recorded their own renditions of songs from Styles's discography. His songs have been featured multiple times at the Live Lounge, a segment from BBC Radio 1 during which acts often perform a track from another artist. Artists such as Jorja Smith, Arcade Fire, Kelly Clarkson, Kygo, Ellie Goulding, Sabrina Carpenter, Little Mix, Lizzo, Måneskin, and Jungkook have all covered Styles's tracks. Additionally, publications such as Billboard have created listicles ranking the best covers of his songs.

Styles has also been referenced and referred to on multiple tracks by other artists, such as Brockhampton's "Johnny" (2017), Logic's "44 More" (2018), Stormzy's "This Is What I Mean" (2022), and Drake and 21 Savage's "Major Distribution" (2022). Taylor Swift's album 1989 (2014) is considered by several publications to be inspired by her relationship with Styles, most prominently on its single "Style". He was also name-dropped on tracks by Kelsey Karter and Dylan.

=== Tribute projects ===
Styles has been the subject of various tribute projects around the world. Vitamin String Quartet released a cover of "As It Was" commemorating the song through classical music. Classical musician Steve Horner also gave tribute to Styles's 2017 single "Sign of The Times" as part of the soundtrack of the second season of the Bridgerton series. He also inspired a jazz-funk cover of "As It Was" by Prep that went viral on TikTok, and an additional experimental jazz cover album entitled A Visit to Harry's House by musicians Spencer Zahn, Dave Harrington, and Jeremy Gustin.

Styles has also been the subject of many tribute concerts across the United Kingdom, including the Candlelight Concerts series and a tour entitled the "Harry's House of Gospel". Styles-themed events like drag brunches and themed bars have also been utilized to pay tribute to the artist.

== Scholarly interest ==
Harry Styles is very popular with our undergraduates — learning to analyze his work and audience helps our students understand their own world. [...] My whole thesis is these concert spaces are trying to create spaces of love. I think it's very smart, very direct, and very political.

— Louie Dean Valencia, an associate professor in digital history at Texas State University, The Fordham Ram (2022)

Styles is a subject of academic research. His fame, societal impact, and identity are broadly the topics of scholarly media studies. In 2022, it was announced that Texas State University would be offering a course titled "Harry Styles and the Cult of Celebrity: Identity, the Internet, and European Pop Culture" by Louie Dean Valencia, an associate professor in digital history, focusing on the dissection of Styles's persona and work on how modern celebrity spawns "questions of gender and sexuality, race, class, nation and globalism, media, fashion, fan culture, internet culture, and consumerism". The course filled up two minutes after registration went live and started in January 2023. Several topics were discussed in the course, including Susan Sontag's 1964 essay "Notes on 'Camp'", the history of rock and roll music, Styles's relationship with his fans, and how he is following in the footsteps of David Bowie, Prince, Elvis Presley, and Little Richard.

Valencia presented a lecture in October 2022 at Fordham University titled "Harry Styles vs. Intolerance: How to Make Authentic, Inclusive, Avant-garde, and Joyful Spaces". An expert on fascism and its effects on popular culture in Franco's Spain, Valencia stated, "The more I thought of it, the more I realized that Harry is the epitome of anti-fascism. He's teaching people to be anti-racist and how to create queer spaces". He also stated that "Styles's comfort with gender fluidity" is one of the main reasons that he decided to build a course about him. Rollins College of liberal arts provided a course titled "Swift & Styles: The Psychology of Fandom", comparing Taylor Swift and Styles's works of music and "their tropes of love, loss, relationships, and rebellion", reviewing the psychology of their fans, and analyzing their concert videos, films, and interviews to understand the crowd's behavior and act of devotion. In 2023, the "Adore You" music video was included in the GCSE Media Studies curriculum available to study in English secondary schools. Scholarly interest regarding Styles spans interdisciplinary subjects such as legality, gendered lexicon, folklore, sociology, kinetic energy, and queerness. (Note: Multiple references:)

== See also ==
- List of most-attended concert tours
- List of highest-certified music artists in the United States
- List of British Grammy winners and nominees
- List of most-streamed artists on Spotify
- List of artists who reached number one in the United States
- List of artists who have achieved simultaneous UK and U.S. number-one hits
