= Lindsay (name) =

Name list

Lindsay (/ˈlɪnzi/) is both an English and Scottish surname and a given name. The given name comes from the Scottish surname and clan name, which comes from the toponym Lindsey, which in turn comes from the Old English toponym Lindesege ("Island of Lind") for the city of Lincoln, in which Lind is the original Brittonic form of the name of Lincoln and island refers to Lincoln being an island in the surrounding fenland. Lindum Colonia was the Roman name of the settlement which is now the City of Lincoln in Lincolnshire. (Lindum Colonia was shortened in Old English to Lindocolina and then Lincylene.) Lindum was a Latinized form of a native Brittonic name which has been reconstructed as *Lindon, which means "pool" or "lake" (cf. the second part of the name Dublin and modern Welsh llyn) and refers to the Brayford Pool.

In the late 19th century, the surnames Lindsay and Lindsey began to be used as given names, at first only as masculine names. They remained typically masculine until the 1960s in Britain and the 1970s in the United States. They are both now unisex names in the United States. In Australia, New Zealand, and Scotland, Lindsay remains popular for masculine use and Lindsey has mainly become feminine. As a first name, Lindsey was the 570th most popular name for girls born in the United States in 2014, while Lindsay ranked 653rd. Both spellings ranked among the top 100 names for girls from 1980 through 1993, with Lindsey peaking at #35 in 1983 and 1984 and Lindsay peaking at #36 in the same years.

== Surname ==
The surname comes from the name of the Anglo-Saxon kingdom of Lindsey. The first user was Sir Walter de Lindesay, one of the retainers of David I of Scotland.

The surname of Lindsay continued to be borne by the Earls of Balcarres and Earls of Crawford, down to the current holder of the title, Anthony Lindsay, 30th Earl of Crawford (born 1958), while the Earls of Lindsay have used the additional surname of Lindesay since its adoption by Reginald Lindesay-Bethune, 12th Earl of Lindsay in 1919.

The names of John de Lindsay (died 1335), Ingram Lindsay (15th century) David Lyndsay (c. 1490 – c. 1555) and Robert Lindsay of Pitscottie (1532–1580) are early examples of the name being used as surname by members of lower nobility in Scotland. Lindsay was used in the United Kingdom by younger sons of the Lindsay clan chiefs, acquiring the status of common surname in the course of the 19th century.

The surname Lindsay is also found in Northern Ireland. Irish people called Lindsay are either descended from members of the Scottish clan Lindsay who migrated to Ireland, or alternatively of the Gaelic O'Loinsigh sept, who sometimes anglicized their name as Lindsay, even though more common anglicizations were Lynch or Linchey. In addition, the MacClintock (MacIlliuntaig) family anglicized their name as Lindsay in the 17th century.

Five men called Linsey are recorded as heads of families in the 1790 United States Census of Prince George's County.

== People named Lindsay ==
=== Surname ===
- Lindsay (surname)

=== Given name ===
Lindsay
- Gender: unisex

Origin
- Origin: clan name, from toponym Lindsey

Other names
- Related names: Lindsey, Linsay, Limsay, Linsey, Lyndsay, Lyndsey, Lynsey, Lynsay, Linzey, Lynzi, Lynzie, Lynsi, Linzie, Linzi, Lindsy, Lyndsy, Lynnsey, Lindsee, Lynsie, Lyndsie, Lyndzee

==== Male ====
- Lindsay Anderson (1923–1994), British film director
- Lindsay Barrett (born 1941), Jamaican-born writer
- Lindsay Brown (baseball) (1911–1987), American baseball player
- Lindsay Cooper (1940–2001), Scottish bassist
- Lindsay Crosby (1938–1989); American actor and singer
- Lindsay Dawson (born 1959), American artist
- Lindsay Gaze (born 1936), Australian basketball player and coach
- Lindsay Grace, American academic, artist, and video game designer
- Lindsay Hamilton (born 1962), Scottish footballer
- Lindsay Hassett (1913–1993), Australian Test cricketer
- Lindsay Hoyle (born 1957), Speaker of the House of Commons, Member of Parliament for Chorley (England)
- Albert Lindsay von Julin (1871–1944), Finnish engineer and businessman
- Lindsay Kemp (1938–2018), British dancer, actor, teacher, mime artist and choreographer
- Lindsay Kline (1934–2015), Australian Test cricketer
- Lindsay Knapp (born 1970), Football player
- Lindsay G. Merrithew (born 1964), Canadian entrepreneur, executive producer, producer, and actor
- Lindsay Rogers (1891–1970), Burgess Professor of Public Law, Columbia University (1920–1959); Director, Social Science Research Council (1934–36)
- Lindsay Scott (born 1960), American football player
- Lindsay Sloper (1826–1887), English pianist
- Lindsay Tait (born 1982), New Zealand basketball player
- Lindsay Tuckett (1919–2016), South African cricketer
- Lindsay Weir (1908–2003), New Zealand cricketer

==== Female ====
- Lindsay Armstrong (born before 1970), South-African born Australian writer
- Lindsay Armaou (born 1978), Greek-Irish singer and actress
- Lindsay Bartholomew (born 1944), English artist
- Lindsay Cooper (1951–2013), English musician and political activist
- Lindsay Crouse (born 1948), American actress
- Lindsay Czarniak (born 1977), American sports anchor and reporter
- Lindsay Davenport (born 1976), American tennis player
- Lindsay Duncan (born 1950), Scottish actress
- Lindsay Edmonds, American basketball coach
- Lindsay Ell (born 1989), Canadian country singer-songwriter and guitarist
- Lindsay Ellingson (born 1984), American fashion model, Victoria's Secret Angel
- Lindsay Ellis (born 1984), American film critic and author
- Lindsay Felton (born 1984), American actress
- Lindsay Gottlieb (born 1977), American basketball coach
- Lindsay Hartley (born 1978), American actress
- Lindsay Hawker (1984–2007), British murder victim
- Lindsay Lee-Waters (born 1977), American tennis player
- Lindsay Lohan (born 1986), American actress and singer
- Lindsay Mathyssen, Canadian politician
- Lindsay Morton, American cancer epidemiologist
- Lindsay Pagano (born 1986), American singer
- Lindsay Price (born 1976), American actress and singer
- Lindsay Riddoch (1993–2017), Scottish mental health activist
- Lindsay Rimer (1981–1994) British unsolved murder victim
- Lindsay Seidel, American voice actress
- Lindsay Sloane (born 1977), American actress
- Lindsay Tarpley (born 1983), American soccer player
- Lindsay Tausch, American politician
- Lindsay Taylor (born 1981), American basketball player
- Lindsay Thorngren (born 2005), American figure skater
- Lindsay Wagner (born 1949), American actress
- Lindsay Peoples Wagner (born 1990), American journalist and editor
- Lindsay Whalen (born 1982), American basketball player
- Lindsay van Zundert (born 2005), Dutch retired figure skater

=== Notable fictional characters ===
- Lindsay Bluth Fünke, a character on Arrested Development
- Lindsay Boxer, a character on Women's Murder Club
- Lindsay Dole, an attorney on The Practice
- Lindsay Monroe, a character on CSI: NY
- Lindsay Rappaport, a character on One Life to Live
- Lindsay Weir, a character on Freaks and Geeks
- Lindsay, a character on the Canadian animated series Total Drama
- Lindsay Cunningham, a character on The Newsreader

== People named Lindsey ==
Lindsey
- Pronunciation: /ˈlɪn(d)zi/
- Gender: Unisex

Origin
- Origin: derived from the toponym Lindsey
- Region of origin: Lincolnshire

Other names
- Related names: Lindsay

=== Surname ===
- Adrian Lindsey (1895–1980), American athlete and coach
- Arthur Ward Lindsey (1894–1963), American entomologist
- Beatrice Lindsay (1858–1917), English zoologist, writer, and editor
- Ben Lindsey (basketball) (born c. 1939), American collegiate basketball coach
- Ben Lindsey (jurist) (1869–1943), American judge and social reformer
- Brandon Lindsey, American football player
- Charles H. Lindsey, British computer scientist
- Chris Lindsey, American country music songwriter and producer
- Christopher Lindsey (born 1983), American professional wrestler known as Roderick Strong
- Isaac Coleman Lindsey (1892–1968), Louisiana politician
- David L. Lindsey, novelist
- Drake Lindsey (born 2005), American football player
- Geoff Lindsey, writer
- George Lindsey, American actor
- Hal Lindsey, American evangelist and Christian writer
- Hillary Lindsey, country music songwriter
- Jim Lindsey, University of Arkansas trustee
- Johanna Lindsey (1952–2019), American romance novelist
- June Lindsey (1922–2021), British-Canadian physicist and crystallographer
- Kate Lindsey, American operatic mezzo-soprano
- Korey Lindsey, American football player
- Lawrence B. Lindsey, economist
- Martin Lindsey, English vice-chancellor
- Melvin Lindsey, broadcaster
- Stephen Lindsey, American politician
- Steve Lindsey, American record producer
- Steven W. Lindsey, American astronaut
- Theophilus Lindsey, theologian, founder of Unitarianism in England

=== Given name ===
==== Male ====
- Lindsey Buckingham (born 1949), American guitarist, singer, composer, and producer, member of Fleetwood Mac
- Lindsey Durlacher (1974–2011), American Greco-Roman wrestler
- Lindsey Ginter (1950–2024), American actor
- Lindsey Graham (1955–2026), American politician and US Senator from South Carolina from 2003 until his death
- Spessard Lindsey Holland (1892–1971), American politician
- Lindsey Hugh Holliman, politician
- Lindsey Hughes, historian
- Lindsey Hunter (born 1970), American basketball player
- Lindsey Lamar, American football player
- Lindsey Lee Moore (1892–1983), American politician from Virginia
- Lindsey Nelson (1919–1995), American sportscaster
- Jay Lindsey Tibbs, baseball player
- Lindsey Witten (born 1988), American football player

==== Female ====
- Lindsey Berg (born 1980), American volleyball player
- Lindsey Cardinale (born 1985), American singer and American Idol contestant
- Lindsey Davis (born 1949), English novelist
- Lindsey Decker (1923–1994), American artist
- Lindsey Earner-Byrne, Professor of Irish Gender History
- Lindsey Evans (born 1989), American fashion model and beauty queen
- Lindsey German (born 1951), British politician
- Lindsey Halligan (born 1989), American lawyer
- Lindsey Harding (born 1984), American basketball coach
- Lindsey Haun (born 1984), American actress and singer
- Lindsey Hilsum (born 1958), English news reporter
- Lindsey Jacobellis (born 1985), American snowboarder
- Lindsey McKeon (born 1982), American actress
- Lindsey Moore (born 1991), American basketball player
- Lindsey Pelas (born 1991), American model
- Lindsey Russell (born 1991), British television presenter
- Lindsey Shaw (born 1989), American actress
- Lindsey Stirling (born 1986), American violinist
- Lindsey Van (born 1984), American ski jumper
- Lindsey Vonn (born 1984), American alpine skier
- Lindsey Vuolo (born 1981), photographer's model
- Lindsey Wixson (born 1994), American fashion model
- Lindsey Wright (born 1979), American professional golfer
- Lindsey Zurbrugg (born 1998), American wheelchair basketball player

==== Notable fictional characters ====
- Lindsey Bergman, American Girl character
- Lindsey Butterfield, a character on the soap opera Hollyoaks
- Lindsey McDonald, a character on the TV show Angel
- Lindsey Naegle, a minor character on the TV show The Simpsons
- Lindsey Novak, a character on the sci-fi series Stargate SG-1

== Other variations ==
=== Lyndsay ===
- Lyndsay DePaul (born 1988), American swimmer
- Lyndsay Glohe (born 1988), Australian football player
- Lyndsay Hammond, Australian musician
- Lyndsay McIntosh (born 1955), Scottish politician
- Lyndsay Meyer (born 1973), American ski-mountaineer
- Lyndsay Proctor, New Zealand rugby player
- Lyndsay Wall (born 1985), American ice-hockey player

=== Linsay ===
- Linsay Willier, Canadian model

=== Linsey ===
Surname

- Joseph Linsey (1899–1994), organized crime figure in Boston's underworld during Prohibition
- Julie Linsey (born 1979), American mechanical engineer
- Meghan Linsey (born 1985), American musician, singer-songwriter, and runner-up of NBC's The Voice season 8

Given name

- Linsey Alexander (1942–2025), American blues songwriter, vocalist, and guitarist
- Linsey Corbin (born 1981), American triathlete
- Linsey Godfrey (born 1989), American actor
- Linsey MacDonald (born 1964), former Scottish sprinter from Dunfermline, Fife
- Linsey Dawn McKenzie (born 1978), English glamour model, pornographic actress, and minor celebrity

=== Lyndsie ===
- Lyndsie Fogarty (born 1984), Australian sprint canoeist
- Lyndsie Holland (1939–2014), English singer and actress

=== Lyndsey ===
- Lyndsey Marshal (born 1978), English actor
- Lyndsey Patterson (born 1982), American soccer player
- Lyndsey Pfaff (born 1978), Belgian television personality
- Lyndsey Rodrigues (born 1981), Australian television personality
- Martin Lyndsey, English 16th-century academic administrator

=== Lyndsy ===
- Lyndsy Fonseca (born 1987), American actress

=== Lynsay ===
- Lynsay Ryan (born 1984), Canadian curler
- Lynsay Sands, Canadian author

=== Lynsey ===
- Lynsey Addario (born 1973), American photojournalist
- Lynsey Alexander (born 1983), Scottish make-up artist
- Lynsey Askew (born 1986), English cricketer
- Lynsey Bartilson (born 1983), American actor
- Lynsey Baxter (born 1959), English actor
- Lynsey de Paul (born 1948), English singer-songwriter
- Lynsey DuFour, American television soap opera writer
- Lynsey Dyer (born 1983), American freestyle skier
- Lynsey Hipgrave (born 1979), English television and radio presenter formerly known as Lynsey Horn
- Lynsey McCullough (born 1991), Irish tennis player
- Lynsey Sharp (born 1990), Scottish athlete

Fictional characters

- Lynsey Nolan, character on the British soap opera Hollyoaks

== See also ==
- Lindsay family tree, showing the relationship between some of the above
