= Versus (Versace) =

Diffusion line of Versace

- Industry: Consumer Goods
- Founded: 1989
- Headquarters: Milan, Italy
- Products: Textile - Apparel
- Website: versus.it

Versus (Versace) was a diffusion line of the Italian luxury fashion house Versace. It was founded in 1989 by Gianni Versace as a gift to his sister Donatella. The line was discontinued in 2005 but was relaunched by Donatella in 2009 with a capsule collection of accessories designed by British designer Christopher Kane.

In 2018, Versus was merged with another Versace diffusion line which is Versace Jeans, to form Versace Jeans Couture. In March 2026, Prada Group announced it would close down Versace Jeans Couture, effectively discontinuing all of Versace's diffusion lines.

== Brand ==
Gianni Versace introduced Versus in 1989 stating that, "Versus was born with an innate creative approach, with a strong focus on innovation, and a flair for the unconventional. An artistic force that takes present fashion forward, anticipating new trends and embracing challenge".

Versus was endorsed by many celebrities including Zayn Malik, Jennifer Lopez, Cheryl Cole, Leighton Meester, Miranda Cosgrove and Alexa Chung, and featured in and on the cover of fashion and lifestyle magazines like Vogue, InStyle, ELLE and Glamour.

== History ==
Versus was a secondary line of the fashion house Versace, created by Gianni Versace as a gift to his sister Donatella. The first fashion show was held in Milan in 1990 and subsequently collections were presented in New York during Fashion Week. Versus was known for its rock-chic style, which influenced the main collections of the house.

In 2004, when Versace faced a downturn in profits, Versus was reduced to a limited collection of accessories and eventually shut down. However, in 2009, Donatella relaunched the brand with a collection of accessories designed in collaboration with Christopher Kane. Later collaborations included a capsule collection by M.I.A. and another one, in December 2013, by Anthony Vaccarello.

== Christopher Kane (2009–2012) ==
Having acted as a consultant at Versace after Donatella acclaimed his MA collection for Central Saint Martins College of Art and Design, Donatella invited Scottish designer Christopher Kane to re-launch the line with her in February 2009 with a capsule collection of handbags, shoes, and jewelry. For spring/summer 2010, Kane presented 16 dresses for the line at Milan Fashion Week. He has since presented two other collections for the line, fall/winter 2009/2010 and most recently spring/summer 2011, his first official runway collection at Milan Fashion Week.

Donatella has likened Kane to her brother, the late Gianni Versace. Since Gianni died in 1997, she has become the creative director of the house's main line and other surviving diffusion lines.

== JW Anderson (2013–2014) ==
Irish designer Jonathan Anderson collaborated for a capsule collection with Versus in 2013. This collaboration was unexpected due to the contrasting styles of the brands. Donatella said of Anderson that "[He] was very "loyal" to the Versus codes" Anderson launched his label JW Anderson in 2008 and was named the creative director of Loewe in September 2013.

== Anthony Vaccarello (2014–2016) ==
Anthony Vaccarello began working with Versus in 2014 and exited in 2016 to become Creative Director for Saint Laurent.
