= Lindsay =

Lindsay may refer to:

== People ==
- Clan Lindsay, a Scottish family clan
- Lindsay (name), an English surname and given name, derived from the Scottish clan name; variants include Lindsey, Lyndsay, Linsay, Linsey, Lyndsey, Lyndsy, Lynsay, Lynsey

== Places ==
Australia

- Division of Lindsay, an electoral district in New South Wales

Canada

- Lindsay, Ontario

United States

- Lindsay, California
- Lindsay, Montana
- Lindsay, Nebraska
- Lindsay, Oklahoma
- Lindsay, South Dakota, a ghost town
- Lindsay, Cooke County, Texas
- Lindsay, Reeves County, Texas

== Other uses ==
- Lindsay (crater), a lunar impact crater
- Lindsay (TV series), an American reality TV series
- USS Lindsay (DE-519), a destroyer escort transferred to the Royal Navy

== See also ==
- Lindsey (disambiguation)
