= Margaret Lindsay (disambiguation) =

Margaret Lindsay (1910–1981) was an American film, stage and television actress.

Margaret Lindsay may also refer to:

- Margaret Lindsay (noblewoman) (1726–1782), Scottish noblewoman

== See also ==
- Lindsay (name)
