= Lindsey =

Lindsey may refer to:

== Places ==
=== Canada ===
- Lindsey Lake, Nova Scotia

=== England ===
- Parts of Lindsey, one of the historic Parts of Lincolnshire and an administrative county from 1889 to 1974
  - East Lindsey, an administrative district in Lincolnshire, and a parliamentary constituency between 1983 and 1997
  - West Lindsey, an administrative district in Lincolnshire
  - Kingdom of Lindsey, an early medieval kingdom in the area of modern Lincolnshire
  - Archdeaconry of Lindsey, created in 1933 and absorbed into the Archdeaconry of Stow & Lindsey in 1994
- Lindsey, Suffolk
- Norton Lindsey, Warwickshire

=== United States ===
- Lindsey, Ohio
- Lindsey, Wisconsin
- Lake Lindsey, Florida
- Mount Lindsey, Colorado

== People ==
- Lindsey (name)
- Earl of Lindsey
- Robert Bertie, 1st Duke of Ancaster and Kesteven, 1st Marquess of Lindsey

== Other uses ==
- USS Lindsey (DM-32), a United States Navy destroyer-minelayer in commission from 1944 to 1946

== See also ==
- Lindsay (disambiguation)
- Linsay
- Linsey (disambiguation)
- Lyndsay
- Lyndsey
- Lynsay
- Lynsey
