= Harry Lambert (stylist) =

British fashion stylist

- Born: 1986 (age 39–40); Norwich, England
- Education: University for the Creative Arts
- Occupation: Fashion stylist
- Known for: Styling Harry Styles
- Awards: UCA Honorary Master of Arts
- Website: www.bryantartists.com/styling/harry-lambert/portfolio/

Harry Lambert (born 1986) is a British fashion stylist. He is best known for his work styling musician Harry Styles, actors Emma Corrin, Josh O'Connor, Alexander Skarsgård and Eddie Redmayne and football player Dominic Calvert-Lewin.

== Early life and education ==
Lambert grew up in Norwich, England and developed an interest in clothing as a child, sparked by VHS tapes of Madonna's music videos that his mother used to show him. He worked at River Island as a teenager and dressed mannequins at his local charity shop.

Lambert studied photography at the University for the Creative Arts (UCA) in Kent, where he became interested in fashion styling through photo shoots with fashion students. He graduated with first-class honours. While studying at university, Lambert spent his summers interning at fashion magazines. As an intern at Vogue, he had the opportunity to work with photographers Tim Walker and Nick Knight. In 2026, Lambert received an honorary Master of Arts from UCA in recognition of his contribution to the fashion industry.

== Career ==
=== Early career ===
Lambert worked as an assistant to a senior menswear stylist in London for two and a half years. Following this, he worked as a commercial stylist for Asos and Topman. Lambert also assisted with styling fashion shows at London Fashion Week for designers JW Anderson, James Long, and Xander Zhou. In 2013, he was a guest judge on Elite Model Look UK. Lambert described decorating bejeweled roller-skates for Little Boots to wear in a shoot as a turning point in his career, and became committed to pursuing styling long-term.

=== Celebrity styling ===
When Lambert met Harry Styles in 2014, the singer favoured wearing Yves Saint Laurent suits and drew inspiration from Mick Jagger's style. Lambert presented him with a wardrobe he described as "playful", inspired by Gucci and JW Anderson. Styles was initially sceptical of Lambert's suggestion to wear flared trousers, but later praised his playful approach to clothing.

In 2015, Styles contacted designer Daniel W. Fletcher through Lambert and purchased every boxy, short-sleeved shirt from Fletcher's graduate collection. Lambert styled Styles in Charles Jeffrey LOVERBOY for The Late Late Show in 2017, then commissioned Harris Reed to create an outfit for Styles' 2018 tour and another for his 2019 "Lights Up" music video. Lambert collaborated with Styles and Gucci creative director Alessandro Michele on Styles' outfit for the 2019 Met Gala.

Lambert worked with designer Steven Stokey-Daley on Styles' "Golden" music video and assisted with fittings for the December 2020 issue of Vogue, which featured a Reed design. He also styled Emma Corrin in early 2020, later styling her for virtual promotional appearances for The Crown, following the disruption of in-person events due to the COVID-19 pandemic. He began working with Corrin's co-star Josh O'Connor for the 2021 Golden Globe Awards and later styled him for the 2021 British Academy Television Awards and the 2021 Cannes Film Festival, where he wore a custom Loewe look.

Lambert also styled Barry Keoghan for the 2021 British Academy Film Awards. Later that year, Lambert styled Dominic Calvert-Lewin, first styling him for Highsnobiety and then for the cover of Arena Homme +, where he wore a flared short suit and a glittery pink Prada handbag.

Lambert also styled Corrin for the 2022 Laurence Olivier Awards and the 2022 Met Gala. That same year, he styled Calvert-Lewin for a British GQ editorial and Alexander Skarsgård for a photo shoot with Interview Magazine. Lambert also worked with Eddie Redmayne during the 2023 awards season.

=== Brand collaborations ===
Lambert styled a campaign for Harvey Nichols in 2013, and a menswear lookbook for Paul & Joe in 2017. In 2021, Lambert partnered with Harry Styles and director Molly Hawkins to launch Pleasing, a gender-neutral nail care and lifestyle brand. The following year, he styled Harris Reed's February 2022 collection, "Sixty Years a Queen", and campaigns for Jo Malone London, S.S. DALEY, and Gucci.

In 2023, Lambert launched "Cutie Chaos", his first clothing collection with Zara, followed by "Cutie Circus" in 2024. His third collection for Zara, "Aww Gee! Wow", was released in collaboration with Disney in 2025. The following year, Lambert collaborated with Pandora on an 11-piece pearl jewellery collection as part of its "Pandora Wonders" range.

=== Style and influence ===
Lambert's work has sparked debate about gender norms in fashion. However, he has said that this debate is not his intention, describing it as a byproduct of his work. He has also said that he hopes to be remembered for styling Harry Styles in pearls and seeing fans recreate the singer's looks for Halloween.

== Personal life ==
Lambert has lived in east London since 2009. In a 2022 interview, he disclosed that he lives with his partner, Antonio.
