= Lynsey Alexander =

Scottish make-up artist (born 1983)

- Born: Lynsey Alexander; Scotland
- Education: London College of Fashion
- Occupation: Make-up artist

Lynsey Alexander (born August 15, 1983) is a Scottish make-up artist, and currently the Global Creative Make-up Artist for Prada Beauty.

== Early life ==
Alexander was raised in Scotland. She quit her philosophy degree after seeing an advert in Vogue for a make-up course and moved to London to study make-up at the London College of Fashion and pursue a career in the fashion industry.

== Career ==
Alexander began her career working for the MAC Pro team and got the chance to learn from names like Charlotte Tilbury, Diane Kendal and Val Garland. After ten years with MAC, Alexander spent six years assisting the make-up artist Lucia Pieroni, learning how to do makeup that was more about abstract mood than by-the-book technique.

She has worked alongside photographers Willy Vanderperre and Alasdair McLellan and created runway looks for JW Anderson, Mary Katrantzou, Missoni, Dior Homme and Rochas.

In July 2023, Alexander was appointed as the Global Creative Make-up Artist for Prada Beauty.
