= Lyndsay (name) =

Lyndsay is a first name in many English-speaking countries, particularly Scotland.

It can be either a feminine or a masculine name. It is a variation of many other types of spellings of the name Lyndsay, including the more well-known spelling Lindsay, as well as "Lindsey", "Linsey", "Lynsey", "Lyndsy", "Lyndsey", "Lynzee", and "Linzi".

== Origins ==
The old Roman name for the city of Lincoln was Lindum Colonia, a name which harked back to the older Celtic name of "Lindon" which meant "the pool". Thus the etymology of the name is inextricably linked with the city of Lincoln in the UK. It is widely thought to originate from a twelfth-century family name in Lincolnshire, England, most notably Sir Walter de Lindeseya, a Norman knight who accompanied King David I upon his return to Scotland in 1124.

The replacement of the "i" by a "y" is a matter of spelling preference, since in English both create the same pronunciation of the name. This may be chosen for either the aesthetic appeal of the overall word shape the usage of the "y" creates, or be connected with its increasing use as unisex name.

== Scottish connection ==
The name is popular in Scotland, and has grown in popularity in the second half of the twentieth century.

Alternatively, the spelling "Lyndsay" may be indicative of the Scottish popularisation of the name. In Scots English, for example, the old English word "Winden" (to twist") is thought to have evolved into the Scots English word "Wynd", meaning a "very narrow street".

Further Scottish connections for this particular spelling come from fifteenth-century Scottish Renaissance poet Sir David Lyndsay, and the Scottish surname "Lynd", which can also be traced to the 15th century in Ayrshire.

== Popularity ==
Until the mid twentieth century it was more popular as a name for a boy, and since the second half of the twentieth century has become much more popular as a name unisex. The recent popularity of the name, and the relative reduction in its usage since the 1980s, might be linked to the popularity of the 1970s television series The Bionic Woman which starred the actress Lindsay Wagner.
