= Steven Stokey-Daley =

British fashion designer

- Born: Liverpool, England
- Education: University of Westminster
- Label: S.S. Daley
- Awards: Winner, LVMH Prize (2022); BFC Foundation Award (2022); Queen Elizabeth II Award for British Design (2024)
- Website: ssdaley.com

Steven Stokey-Daley is a British fashion designer. He founded the London-based label S.S. Daley in 2020, after graduating from the University of Westminster. The label's menswear recasts the dress codes of the British upper classes through a queer, working-class lens, and his fashion shows often take the form of theatrical performances. He became widely known when the singer Harry Styles wore pieces from his graduate collection in the 2020 music video for "Golden"; in 2024 Styles took a minority stake in the label. Stokey-Daley won the LVMH Prize and the British Fashion Council's Foundation Award in 2022, and received the Queen Elizabeth II Award for British Design in 2024.

== Early life and education ==
Stokey-Daley grew up in the suburbs of Liverpool, on what he has called a former council estate; his father and grandfather were builders. His grandmother Denise had worked in a local sewing factory from the age of 14 and, as a young woman, turned down an apprenticeship with a tailor in London, a family story Stokey-Daley has cited as a source of his own drive. As a teenager he spent a summer with the National Youth Theatre in London and for a time wanted to act or write plays, and he worked at a McDonald's in Aintree between the ages of 16 and 19. He had been due to study English literature and theatre studies at the University of Warwick, but changed his mind the day before he was set to leave and instead took an art foundation course at a local college, where a tutor suggested fashion.

Stokey-Daley was the first member of his family to attend university. At the University of Westminster, his fashion studio overlooked the grounds of Harrow School, and watching its uniformed pupils fed an interest in the dress codes of Britain's elite schools that runs through his work. He wrote his dissertation on Brechtian theory and the uniform of Eton College, and interned for six months each on the menswear teams at Tom Ford and Alexander McQueen, the latter donating fabric toward his graduate collection. That collection, "The Inalienable Right", was shown as part of the university's fashion design BA show on the London Fashion Week schedule in February 2020, and he graduated that June.

== Career ==
=== Founding and the "Golden" video ===
After graduating, Stokey-Daley founded S.S. Daley in 2020, working from his childhood bedroom in Liverpool during the COVID-19 lockdown and taking orders over Instagram. In September 2020 the stylist Harry Lambert posted an open call for young designers to send him their work; Stokey-Daley answered, and Lambert pulled looks from the graduate collection for his client Harry Styles. Styles wore the label's "Hall Tennant" shirt and "Sebastian" trousers in the video for "Golden", shot in Portofino, and preorders of the two pieces taken when the video came out paid for the label's first collection. Stokey-Daley has said the shirt and trousers were made from curtains his grandmother found in a Liverpool charity shop, and that she recruited friends from her factory days to help sew the orders before Christmas. The two pieces were later exhibited in "Rebel: 30 Years of London Fashion" at the Design Museum in London.

In 2021 the label received NEWGEN sponsorship from the British Fashion Council, and Matches Fashion exclusively stocked the Fall/Winter 2021 collection, "The Robe Room Is Becoming the Garden". The collection's title was a twist on a Michael Nyman piece from the score of The Draughtsman's Contract.

=== London Fashion Week shows ===
Stokey-Daley made his London Fashion Week debut in September 2021 with the Spring/Summer 2022 collection, staged as a play rather than a catwalk show: ten actors aged 18 to 24 from the National Youth Theatre performed a three-act drama, written with the group's artistic director Paul Roseby, built around class, masculinity, race, sexuality, and institutional violence in British boys' public schools. Sarah Mower, reviewing the show for Vogue, wrote that he had "launched his brand in physical form in fashion week in a way nobody's ever quite done before".

The label's later London shows kept the theatrical format. The Fall/Winter 2022 show, held at the Old Selfridges Hotel in February 2022, shifted the focus from the public school to the stately home, with dancers moving through domestic tableaux informed by Gosford Park. For Spring/Summer 2023, staged at the St Pancras Hotel, actors read from the love letters of Vita Sackville-West and Violet Keppel. The Fall/Winter 2023 collection, "The Ninth Wave", took its name from the Kate Bush song and looked to a great-grandfather who had served in the merchant navy; the show, staged at the Outernet London venue off Tottenham Court Road, opened with Ian McKellen reading Alfred, Lord Tennyson's "The Coming of Arthur", after McKellen had asked to take part. Reviewing the show, WWD noted that Stokey-Daley was the only designer on that season's London Fashion Week calendar to present clothes cut for plus-size men.

=== LVMH Prize ===
In 2022 Stokey-Daley was one of eight finalists for the LVMH Prize, chosen from some 1,900 applicants. On June 2, 2022, at the Fondation Louis Vuitton in Paris, Cate Blanchett announced him as the winner of the prize's ninth edition, which carried a 300,000 euro award and a year of mentoring from LVMH. Jury member Nigo said he was struck that "in only two years he has built a complete vision of his brand", with a staff of two.

That December, the British Fashion Council gave Stokey-Daley its Foundation Award for emerging designer talent at The Fashion Awards, held at the Royal Albert Hall.

=== Pitti Uomo and investment from Harry Styles ===
In October 2023 Stokey-Daley was named guest designer for the 105th edition of the Pitti Immagine Uomo trade fair in Florence. He presented his Fall/Winter 2024 collection there on January 11, 2024, in the Salone dei Cinquecento of the Palazzo Vecchio, a show that drew on a 1935 Oxford student's diary, the photographs of 1980s Oxford high society by Dafydd Jones, and an E. M. Forster short story about British tourists in Italy.

As the show ended, the label announced that Harry Styles had acquired a minority stake in the company; the terms were not disclosed. Stokey-Daley said the investment, directed at the direct-to-consumer business, allowed him to relaunch the label's website and hire staff, and that he and Styles shared a plan to build S.S. Daley into "a modern British heritage house". By that time the brand was stocked by retailers including Saks Fifth Avenue, Dover Street Market, and Bergdorf Goodman.

=== Move into womenswear ===
Stokey-Daley presented his first womenswear collection at London Fashion Week on September 13, 2024, the day after receiving the Queen Elizabeth II Award for British Design; Styles and Emma Corrin sat in the front row. The Spring/Summer 2025 collection took its cues from the painter Gluck, who presented as a man in the 1920s and 1930s, and the society florist Constance Spry. His Fall/Winter 2025 coed show in London the following February revisited British wardrobe staples such as the trench coat, duffle coat, and donkey jacket, nodded to Marianne Faithfull, and included felted coats and totes inspired by the Scottish painter Francis Cadell.

== Design approach ==
Stokey-Daley's work pairs the uniforms of the British upper classes, the blazers, boaters, and rugby and rowing kit of the public schools, with the sportswear of his own Liverpool upbringing, an approach he has described as "micro-subversions". He has said he wants to pull "antiquated, stuffy old ideas of British heritage" into a modern context from his working-class perspective, and he describes the culture he examines as homosocial rather than homosexual. His early collections drew on literary and screen references including Brideshead Revisited, Maurice, and Another Country.

The label's early output was made largely from deadstock, donated, and end-of-roll fabrics, among them curtains, tablecloths, and upholstery textiles, and was produced in Britain; as it grew, Stokey-Daley moved tailoring production to Italy and jersey to Portugal while keeping knitwear in the United Kingdom. Recurring signatures include wide-legged Oxford bags, argyle-knit vests, and embroidered shirts, and a mallard duck motif taken from a canal near his childhood home.

His presentations favor theater over the conventional runway, a habit tied to his own background in youth theater; he has said that audiences traveling to a show should see "a show-show".

== Awards ==
Stokey-Daley received the British Fashion Council's NEWGEN sponsorship in 2021. In 2022 he won the LVMH Prize and, later that year, the BFC Foundation Award at the Fashion Awards, and he was named to the BoF 500, The Business of Fashion's index of people shaping the industry. In September 2024 he received the Queen Elizabeth II Award for British Design, presented by Sophie, Duchess of Edinburgh, at the Royal Academy of Arts; he was the award's seventh recipient.

== Personal life ==
Stokey-Daley's partner, Leo Meredith, is a dancer and works with the label as production coordinator.
