= Pleasing (brand) =

Unisex beauty and lifestyle brand

The Pleasing Company LP
- Type: Private
- Industry: Lifestyle
- Founded: November 15, 2021; 4 years ago
- Founder: Harry Styles; Harry Lambert
- Headquarters: London
- Area served: Worldwide
- Products: Apparel; beauty; candles; skincare
- Website: pleasing.com

Pleasing is a unisex lifestyle brand by English singer-songwriter Harry Styles. It was launched in November 2021. Pleasing initially launched as a direct to consumer e-commerce brand before expanding to pop-up stores and a permanent retail deal with the Selfridges flagship store in London, England. Temporary Pleasing pop-up stores have been located across the United States and the United Kingdom, including London, Margate, New York City, Los Angeles, and Austin.

By 2022, the brand reached sales of $12.2 million. As of 2025, the brand has annual sales revenue of $16 million.

== History ==
In June 2021 Harry Styles, alongside his executive assistant Emma Spring, filed a trademark for a company titled “Pleased As Holdings." Styles launched the brand on 15 November 2021 with a cover story for DAZED magazine. The initial products were available beginning that day for pre-order before officially dropping on November 29, 2021. In an adjoining press release, Styles stated the products were inspired by the things he uses in his own beauty routine as he "didn't want to make products to mask people, I wanted to highlight them and make them feel beautiful." The Dazed issue features an in-depth interview where Styles shares his goals for the brand and its unisex approach.

Speaking on the brand's conception and launch Styles stated:

“It was an idea I’d had for a while. I’d been talking with a couple of people close to me, like Molly [Hawkins, Styles’ creative director]. It’s starting with nail polish, because that was kind of the birth of what it was for. Me seeing a colour on a flower or a wallpaper or something and thinking, ‘Oh, I wanna put that on my nails’. It was a fun little project, but during the pandemic [...] I’ve always found that the moments in my life which have brought me the most joy are the small ones [...] I really think that the essence of Pleasing is finding those little moments of joy and showing them to people.”

In June 2023 it was announced that Shaun Kearney, former chief design and merchandising officer at Gwyneth Paltrow’s Goop would become Pleasing's first CEO on July 17, as part of the brand's strategy to expand. Kearney joined the Pleasing team, consisting of co-creative directors Harry Lambert and Molly Hawkins, as well as Sophie Kerr-Dineen, head of Marketing.

In July 2025, Pleasing launched Pleasing Yourself, a range focused on sexual wellness, debuting with a vibrator and silicone-based lubricant developed in collaboration with sex educator Zoe Ligon.

== Partnerships ==
Musician Mick Fleetwood acted as model and ambassador for the "Shroom Bloom" collection's campaign. Styles has cited Fleetwood Mac as an inspiration in his musical career and speaking to Vogue of the collaboration, Styles stated "there couldn't be a better embodiment of Pleasing, or a person who could so naturally capture the wizardry that we love."

The brand first collaborated with Brazilian fashion designer Marco Ribeiro as part of the "Pleasing x Marco Ribeiro" collection, revealed at the designer’s debut Spring/Summer 2023 presentation during Paris Fashion Week. The collection was the first launch of beauty products for the site, which Styles commented: “To me, the way Marco uses colour is so inspiring; everything he makes radiates fun, joy and playfulness. When we started discussing collaborators for Pleasing, Marco was the first person I wanted to ask.”

Their second major collaboration was with Disney's Fantasia, releasing a 30-piece collection of nail polish, clothing, accessories, and stationary items online and across select Disney Stores and pop-ups. Kearney stated that he was excited to "[Merge] Walt Disney Studio's groundbreaking multi-generational film, Fantasia, with Pleasing's joyful approach to product creation" and that the collaboration represented "uniting the magic, emotion and artistry" of the two brands.

They later collaborated with fashion brand JW Anderson, releasing a collection that included nail polish, clothing, and accessories, and marking Andersons first foray into beauty products. Lambert remarked that JW Anderson was a brand that they "[felt] so aligned with in terms of point of view" and that they had "wanted to collaborate with for some time".

=== Charity ===
With each new collection from initial launch, Pleasing partnered with a non-profit organization which receives a portion of the proceeds of the collection as part of the "Do Better" campaign. Marked on the brand's webstore, Pleasing states that "Although we prioritize people and the planet, we know that we can always do better and we strive to do so every day." The brand has worked with:

- Nest for the "Perfect Pearl" collection
- Cool Earth for the "Shroom Bloom" collection
- Queer Circle for the "Hot Holiday" collection
- Covenant House for the "Super Magic Family Time" collection
- Project Roots for the "Pollinators" collection
- GlamourGals for the "Fancy Friends" collection

== Awards ==
Award	Year	Category	Result	Ref.
Cosmopolitan Holy Grail Beauty Awards	2023	Best Nail Color	Won	
Allure Best of Beauty 2023: Body	2023	Best Body Oil	Won	
Vogue Beauty Awards	2024	Best Boutique Perfume	Won	
