= Jonathan Anderson (fashion designer) =

Irish fashion designer (born 1984)

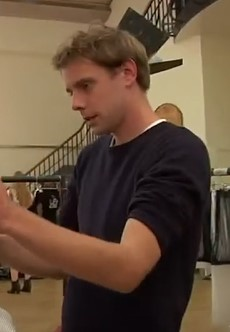
- Anderson in 2013
- Born: Jonathan William Anderson; 17 September 1984 (age 42); Magherafelt, County Londonderry, Northern Ireland
- Education: London College of Fashion
- Occupation: Fashion designer
- Years active: 2005–present
- Title: Creative director of Dior; Founder of JW Anderson
- Parent: Willie Anderson

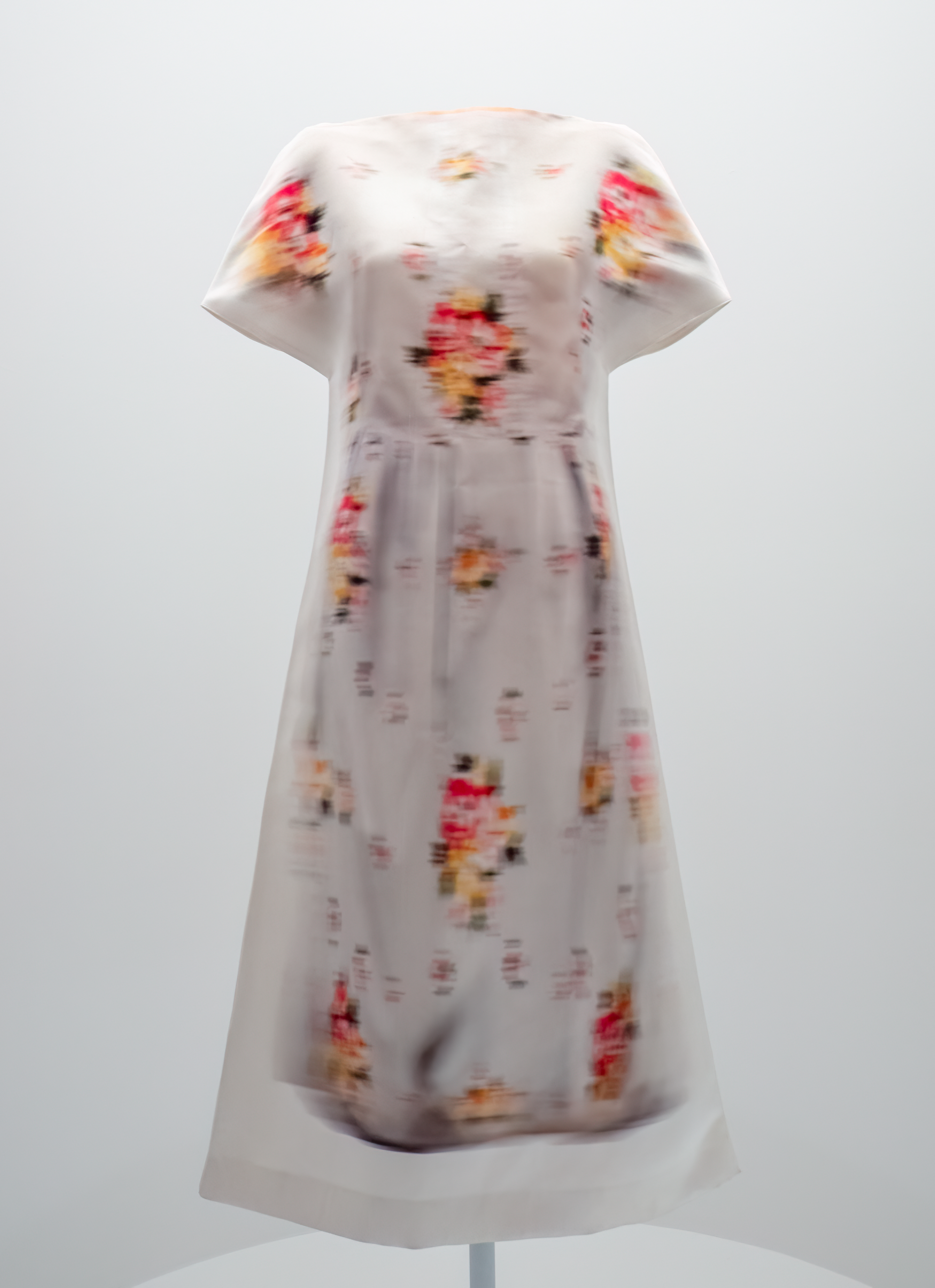
Dress by Anderson for Loewe featured in the Sleeping Beauties: Reawakening Fashion exhibition at the Metropolitan Museum of Art

Jonathan William Anderson (born 17 September 1984) is a Northern Irish fashion designer and the founder of JW Anderson. Anderson is known for his eponymous label and having been the creative director of Spanish luxury house Loewe. He has been the creative director of Christian Dior since 2025.

== Early life ==
Jonathan William Anderson was born on 17 September 1984 in the town of Magherafelt in Northern Ireland. He is the son of Willie Anderson, who played international rugby for Ireland between 1984 and 1990. His mother, Heather Buckley, worked as a secondary school English teacher. Anderson has a brother, Thomas, who followed his father into professional rugby. His grandfather was a textile designer.

Anderson grew up in Northern Ireland during The Troubles but spent considerable time on the Balearic island of Ibiza, where his parents owned a house. He has said in interviews that the contrasting environments played a significant role in shaping his sensibilities as a designer. Anderson described his childhood in Northern Ireland as "...car bombs, a town getting blown up. It was awful, and really confusing as a child to live through that, but it toughened me up. I don’t take anything for granted because I know that life is like a fuse." When he was in primary school, he was diagnosed with severe dyslexia. In a September 2015 interview with The Guardian, Anderson said, "When I look back at things I'm into today, I always think it's things between (ages) 8 and 15 that influence the most."

At the age of 18, Anderson moved to the United States to try to become an actor. He was based in New York City at the Juilliard School, but developed an interest in costume design rather than acting. He moved to Dublin shortly afterwards, securing his first fashion-related job at the department store Brown Thomas. He later moved to London and graduated from the London College of Fashion in 2005.

== Career ==
=== Prada and own house ===
Anderson began his career working as a visual merchandiser for Prada, working for Manuela Pavesi. He launched his menswear collection under the JW Anderson label shortly after, in 2008, to critical acclaim. In 2010, Anderson received sponsorship from the British Fashion Council's Newton committee and subsequently produced his first catwalk collection at London Fashion Week.

The success of the label allowed Anderson to secure a second NewGen sponsorship. A collaboration with high-street retailer Topshop followed, in 2012, a collection of limited-edition items, known as the JW Anderson x Topshop collection. It featured clothing and accessories ranging from mini-kilts and paisley prints, to Halloween motifs and included a range of stationery, iPhone cases and Rubik's cubes. The collection sold out within hours of it launching. Anderson and Topshop scheduled another collaboration to launch a year later, with the release coming in February 2013.

Later that year, Donatella Versace enlisted him to replace Christopher Kane at Versace's diffusion line Versus, where he showcased his first collection in June at New York's Lexington Armoury.

=== Loewe ===
In September 2013, LVMH took a minority stake in JW Anderson and named Anderson as the new creative director for Spanish luxury house Loewe. By 2019, he created 18 different collections each year — six for his own label, 10 for Loewe and two for his ongoing collaborations with Uniqlo. In 2019, he became a member of the board of trustees at the Victoria and Albert Museum.

In February 2023, Anderson designed singer Rihanna's red outfit, which she used to announce her second pregnancy during her half-time Super Bowl performance. That same year Anderson served as costume designer for Luca Guadagnino's Queer. Anderson had previously worked with Guadagnino in 2022, during the production of his film Challengers. His film work has led him to being signed by UTA.

=== Dior ===
After 11 years at Loewe, Anderson stepped down as the house's creative director on 17 March 2025. On April 17th, Vogue announced his appointment as the artistic director of Dior menswear, succeeding Kim Jones, who stepped down earlier that January. In June 2025, Anderson was further named creative director of Dior womenswear and couture collections. In June 2025, Dior unveiled a reimagined version of the Lady Dior handbag, a collaboration between Anderson and textile artist Sheila Hicks; the handbag made its debut at Anderson’s Spring Summer 2026, his inaugural collection for the Dior. In July 2026, Anderson was announced as the designer of Taylor Swift's wedding gown.

== Personal life ==
Anderson is gay. He splits his time between London and Paris. He also maintains a weekend home in Norfolk. As of March 2025, he is in a relationship with Catalan artist Pol Anglada.

== Awards and honors ==
Award	Year	Recipient(s)	Category	Ref.
The Fashion Awards	2012	JW Anderson	Emerging Talent Award – Ready-To-Wear	
The Fashion Awards	2013	JW Anderson	New Establishment Designer of The Year	
The Fashion Awards	2014	JW Anderson	Menswear Designer of The Year	
The Fashion Awards	2015	JW Anderson	Menswear Designer of The Year	
The Fashion Awards	2015	JW Anderson	Womenswear Designer of The Year	
The Fashion Awards	2017	Jonathan Anderson for JW Anderson	British Designer of The Year – Womenswear	
The Fashion Awards	2017	Jonathan Anderson for Loewe	Accessories Designer of The Year	
The Fashion Awards	2020	Jonathan Anderson	Creativity	
The Fashion Awards	2023	Jonathan Anderson for JW Anderson and Loewe	Designer of The Year	
The Fashion Awards	2024	Jonathan Anderson for JW Anderson and Loewe	Designer of The Year	
CFDA Fashion Awards	2023	Jonathan Anderson	International Designer of the Year	
