= Lindsey Earner-Byrne =

Professor of Irish Gender History

Dr. Lindsey Earner-Byrne
- Known for: Professor of Irish Gender history, Irish history author

Academic work
- Notable works: Mother and Child: Maternity and Child Welfare in Dublin, 1920s-1960s Letters of the Catholic Poor. Poverty in Independent Ireland, 1920-1940; The rape of Mary M.: A microhistory of sexual violence and moral redemption in 1920s Ireland Forgotten: The Widows of the Irish Revolution

Lindsey Earner-Byrne is currently Professor of Contemporary Irish History at Trinity College Dublin, Ireland and author of Irish history books.

== Biography ==
Dr Lindsey Earner-Byrne is a historian focusing on modern Irish history. She was a lecturer in the School of History at University College Dublin. Her research has covered gender, health and welfare with a particular interest in sexual violence. Earner-Byrne became the SALI Chair of Irish Gender History at UCC in January 2021, and was the Professor of Irish Gender history at University College Cork. Earner-Byrne is on the Board of the Irish Manuscripts Commission. She's a member of the Royal Irish Academy.

== Bibliography ==
=== Books ===
- Mother and Child: Maternity and Child Welfare in Dublin, 1920s-1960s, Manchester, 2007
- Letters of the Catholic Poor. Poverty in Independent Ireland, 1920-1940, Cambridge University Press, 2017

=== Articles ===
- "The rape of Mary M.: A microhistory of sexual violence and moral redemption in 1920s Ireland", Journal of the History of Sexuality, (Jan. 2015)

=== Films ===
- Forgotten: The Widows of the Irish Revolution (RTÉ One, May 2022)
