= Lindsay Riddoch =

Scottish mental health activist

Lindsay Riddoch (1993 – December 2017) was a Scottish mental health activist.

Born in Edinburgh, Riddoch was educated at Boroughmuir High School, United World College of the Atlantic in Wales, and at the University of London. She graduated from the University of London's School of African and Oriental Studies (SOAS) in 2014 with a first-class honours degree in history, specialising in Islam and the Middle East. As a member of the digital activist group 38 Degrees, she campaigned for greater accountability among MPs. Riddoch suffered from long-term mental health problems and campaigned for better mental health services. While at Atlantic College, she launched the website "1000 Voices" to help teenagers with mental health problems. It was promoted on social media by the actor Stephen Fry. She also wrote and performed poetry, which explored her struggles with mental illness.

Lindsay Riddoch took her own life in December 2017 at the age of 24. A mental health research fund, Words That Carry On, has been set up in her memory.
