= Lindsay, South Dakota =

Lindsay is a ghost town in Stanley County, in the U.S. state of South Dakota.

== History ==
The town had the name of Charles Lindsay, a local merchant. A post office called Lindsay was established in 1902, and remained in operation until 1945. The post office coords were 44.7191492°N 100.9962603°W.
