= Lindsay Morton =

American cancer epidemiologist

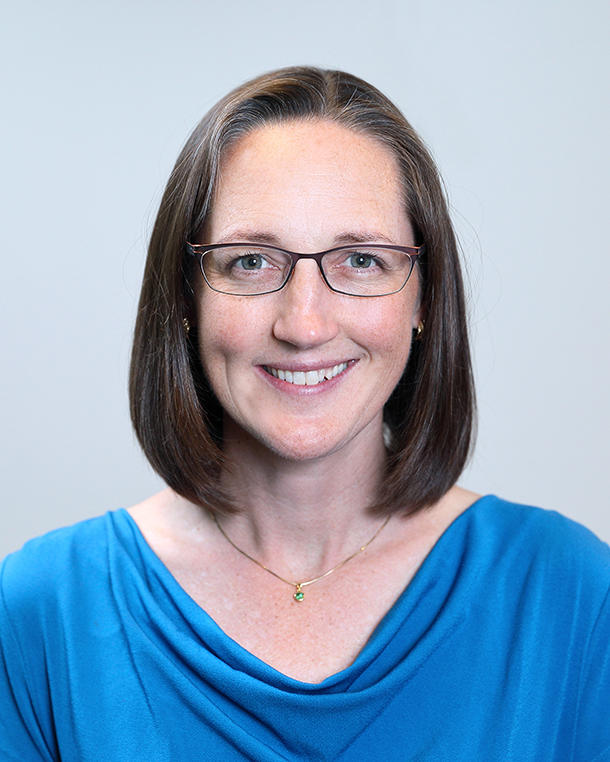
- Morton in 2018
- Education: Dartmouth College; Yale School of Public Health
- Scientific career
- Fields: Cancer epidemiology, genetic susceptibility
- Workplaces: National Cancer Institute
- Doctoral advisor: Tongzhang Zheng
- Other academic advisors: Thomas B. Roos

Lindsay McOmber Morton is an American cancer epidemiologist who researches genetic susceptibility to second cancers. She is the Director of the radiation epidemiology branch and head of its cancer survivorship research unit at the National Cancer Institute.

== Life ==
Morton received a B.A. from Dartmouth College. Thomas B. Roos mentored and introduced Morton to epidemiology during her undergraduate studies. She earned a Ph.D. in epidemiology from Yale School of Public Health with a focus on cancer epidemiology. Her 2004 dissertation was titled, An epidemiologic investigation of the roles of alcohol consumption and cigarette smoking in the etiology of non-Hodgkin-lymphoma. Tongzhang Zheng was her doctoral advisor. Patricia Hartge of the National Cancer Institute (NCI) was Morton's primary advisor during her final year of her dissertation. She joined the NCI division of cancer epidemiology and genetics (DCEG) in 2004 as a postdoctoral fellow with a concentration in molecular epidemiology. During her doctoral and postdoctoral training, she focused her research on understanding the causes of lymphoid neoplasms.

In 2008, Morton joined the radiation epidemiology branch (REB) as a tenure-track investigator. She expanded her research to the study of multiple primary cancers, evaluating the carcinogenic effects of radiotherapy and chemotherapy, as well as other environmental and genetic risk factors for second cancers. In 2015, Morton was awarded scientific tenure by National Institutes of Health (NIH) and became a senior investigator. She was promoted to deputy chief of the REB in 2020 and became head of the cancer survivorship research unit within REB in 2021. Morton became the Director of REB in 2022. She is an elected member of the American Epidemiological Society. She researches identify genetic variants associated with the development of second cancers.
