= JW Anderson =

UK fashion label

- Type: Private
- Industry: Retail
- Founded: 2008; 18 years ago
- Founder: Jonathan Anderson
- Headquarters: London, United Kingdom
- Number of locations: 5 stores worldwide (2026)
- Key people: Jonathan Anderson (creative director)
- Products: Luxury goods
- Owner: LVMH (minority stake)
- Website: jwanderson.com

JW Anderson is a UK fashion label, founded by Jonathan Anderson.

Originally from Magherafelt in The North of Ireland, Anderson established JW Anderson in London in 2008. The brand initially focused on menswear, before moving into womenswear in 2010. From 2012 onwards, the brand and its designer have collaborated with a number of retail fashion brands, most notably Topshop, Versace, and Uniqlo, with LVMH acquiring a minority stake in the brand in 2013.

JW Anderson won both men's and women's brand of the year at British Fashion Council's The Fashion Awards in 2015, the first brand to pick up both awards in the same year.

== History ==
Jonathan Anderson graduated from the London College of Fashion, before initially pursuing a career in acting. While working at the Studio Theatre in Washington D.C., he became interested in costume design and went on to study a degree in menswear design, graduating in 2005. He worked as visual merchandiser at Prada, working alongside the designer, Manuela Pavesi. Anderson then moved to London to establish his eponymous label in 2008.

JW Anderson launched a menswear line in 2008. It later introduced a womenswear line for autumn 2010. During the same year, JW Anderson received sponsorship from the British Fashion Council committee, presenting their first catwalk collection at London Fashion Week. JW Anderson secured its second sponsorship from the British Fashion Council in 2011, before winning the Emerging Talent Award in 2012.

JW Anderson became a more widely known brand in Britain after Jonathan Anderson collaborated with Topshop in 2012 creating a limited edition collection of clothing and accessories. Vogue covered the brand's spring/summer collection that same year, including paisley-print daywear pyjamas, which sold out shortly after launch. During London Fashion Week in 2012, JW Anderson announced it was to host its first menswear-dedicated fashion week show. JW Anderson and Topshop collaborated again in early 2013.

In June 2013, Jonathan Anderson showcased his first collection for Versace. The collection was for Versace's diffusion line, Versus, with Anderson as the line's relaunch designer. Part of Jonathan Anderson's focus as a designer for JW Anderson was on unisex clothes, and he carried this fashion ethos with him to Versace. It was also rumoured at the same time that LVMH were considering Anderson for the role of creative director at Louis Vuitton. It was announced in September 2013 that LVMH had acquired a minority stake in JW Anderson. As part of the deal, Anderson was announced as creative director of the Spanish fashion house, Loewe.

JW Anderson gave exclusive livestreaming rights to the queer dating app Grindr for their Autumn/Winter 2016 fashion show. Users of the app were given a link to the livestream in their inboxes, which they opened in their phone or tablet browsers. The show was played on a loop for twenty-four hours after it was completed.

== Workshops ==
Taking inspiration from the Omega Workshops, JW Anderson announced it would be launching its own workshops in Shoreditch, London. Formerly known as the JW Anderson Workshops, it was created to merge an exhibition experience within a store.

The workshops housed a number of collections and collaborations throughout 2016, including with A$AP Rocky, M/M Paris, Printed Matter, Inc., Mackintosh, Giles Round, and photographers Jamie Hawkesworth, Ian David Baker, and Alasdair McLellan.

The JW Anderson Workshops also co-released a book with Spanish publisher Luis Venegas in 2016.

== Exhibition ==
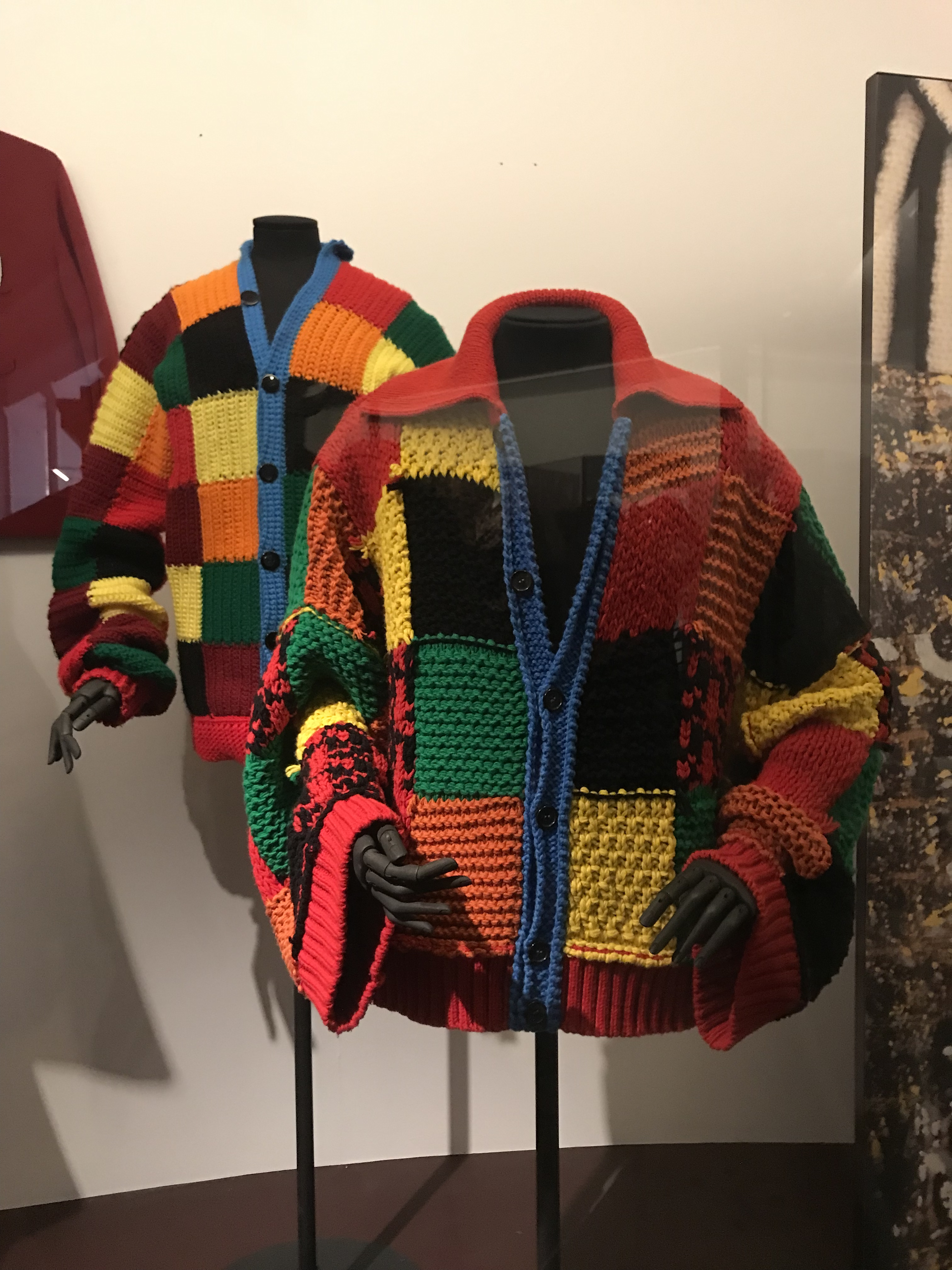
Harry Styles' cardigan on display at the Victoria and Albert Museum.

JW Anderson announced their first exhibition in September 2016, Disobedient Bodies at The Hepworth Wakefield from March to June 2017. The show aimed to create discussion on the theme of the body, specifically how each body part can disobey the body. More than 100 works were presented at the exhibition, including Issey Miyake and Yves Saint Laurent.

In 2020, JW Anderson made the knitting pattern pattern for a rainbow cardigan musician Harry Styles wore in rehearsals for the Today Show available to the public after knitting it became a DIY challenge on TikTok. Later that year, it was acquired by the Victoria and Albert Museum as an item of cultural importance related to the COVID-19 pandemic.

== Awards and honours ==
In 2015, JW Anderson under Jonathan Anderson became the first brand to win both Menswear Designer of The Year and Womenswear Designer of the Year awards at The Fashion Awards.

Award	Year	Recipient(s)	Category	Ref.
The Fashion Awards	2012	JW Anderson	Emerging Talent Award - Ready-To-Wear	
The Fashion Awards	2013	JW Anderson	New Establishment Designer of The Year	
The Fashion Awards	2014	JW Anderson	Menswear Designer of The Year	
The Fashion Awards	2015	JW Anderson	Menswear Designer of The Year	
The Fashion Awards	2015	JW Anderson	Womenswear Designer of The Year	
The Fashion Awards	2017	Jonathan Anderson for JW Anderson	British Designer of The Year - Womenswear	

== Collaborations ==
- Topshop (2012 - 2013)
- Versus Versace (2013)
- Uniqlo (2017 - present)
- Converse (2017)
- Moncler (2020 - present)
- Pleasing (2024 - present)
- Diadora (2026)
