= Blue Gucci dress of Harry Styles =

Dress worn by Harry Styles

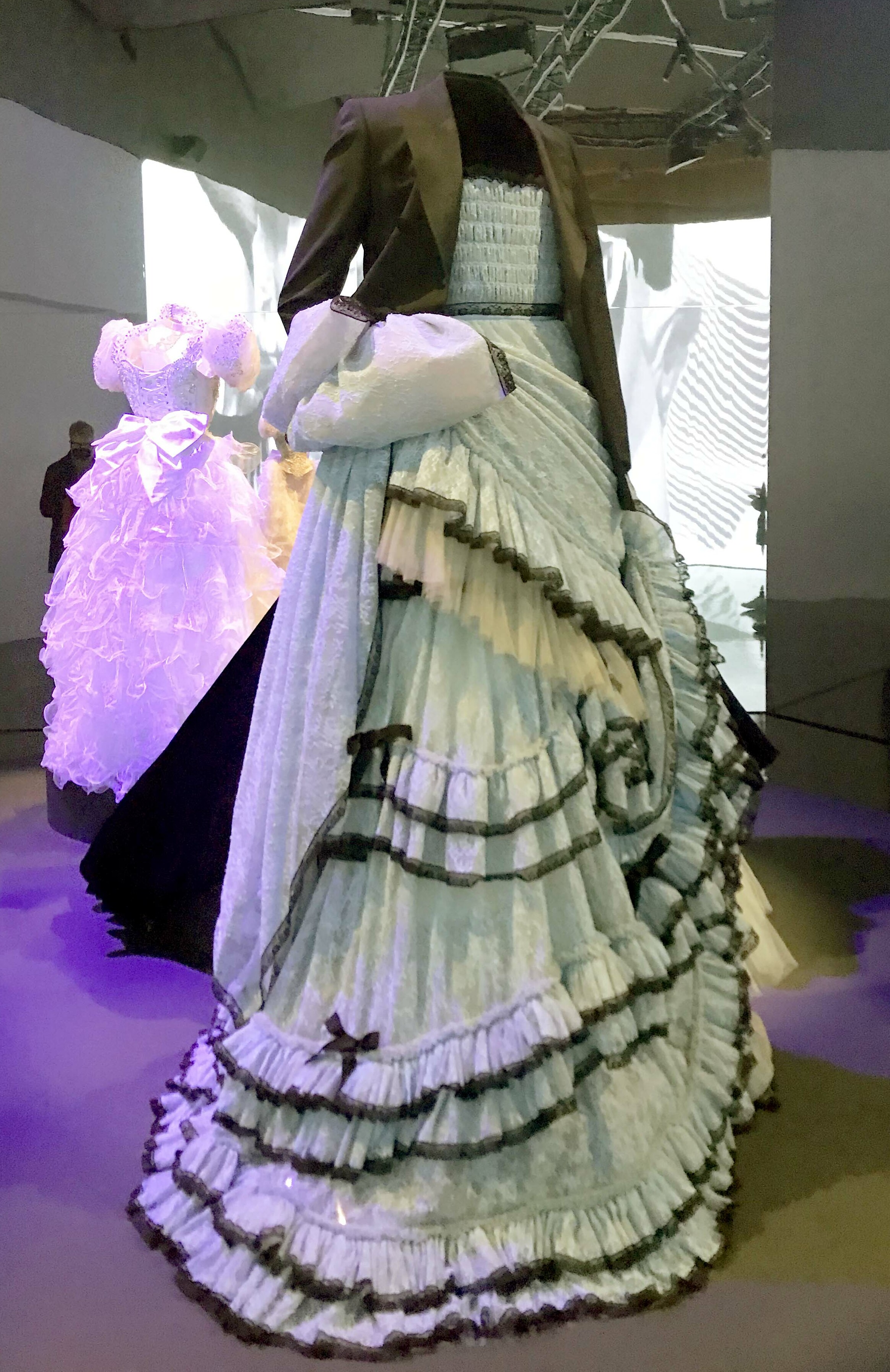
- The blue dress, pictured at the Victoria and Albert Museum in London
- Designer: Alessandro Michele
- Year: 2020
- Material: Lace

English singer Harry Styles wore a blue Gucci dress designed by Alessandro Michele for Vogue's December 2020 issue, becoming the first man to appear solo on the magazine's cover. Styles, regarded by the media as a fashion icon and one of the most influential men in fashion, had previously modelled for various magazines throughout his career. He co-chaired the 2019 Met Gala alongside Michele, and dressed androgynously on several occasions in 2019 and 2020. For the Vogue cover, Styles paired the ruffle-trimmed lace gown with a black double-breasted tuxedo jacket.

The dress received reactions from both conservative and progressive public figures, sparking a significant amount of conversation regarding sexuality, race, and privilege. Conservatives condemned the perceived corruption of traditional masculinity, while progressives and some media publications praised Styles for pushing the boundaries of men's fashion. The dress was well received by the general public and cemented Styles's status as a fashion icon. It was featured at the 2022 Fashioning Masculinities: The Art of Menswear exhibition at the Victoria and Albert Museum, and a portrait of Styles wearing the dress was included in the History Makers exhibition at the National Portrait Gallery in 2024.

== Background ==
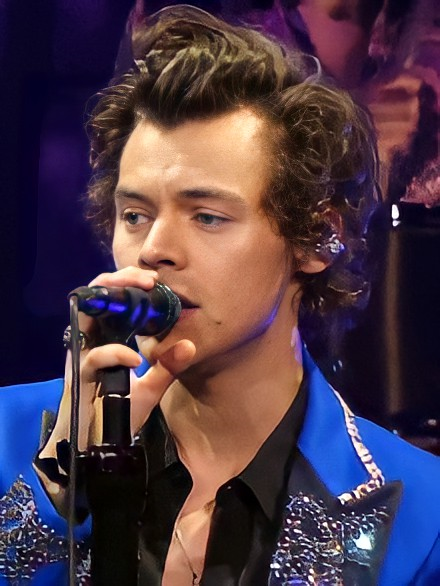
Harry Styles in 2018

Harry Styles has been labelled a fashion icon and one of the most influential men in fashion by several publications. (Note: Attributed to multiple references:) He won the British Style Award at the 2013 British Fashion Awards. Styles began to wear Gucci regularly in 2015, and he did his first solo editorial shoot with Another Man magazine the following year. He modelled for several magazines in the following years, including Rolling Stone (twice), The Face, L'Officiel Hommes, The Guardian, Music Week, and Beauty Papers. Throughout 2018–2019, Styles also became the face of three Gucci tailoring campaigns.

Styles co-chaired the 2019 Met Gala alongside Gucci's then-creative director, Alessandro Michele. He dressed androgynously on multiple occasions in 2019–2020, including fishnets in the Beauty Papers shoot, a black dress in The Guardian shoot, and Mary Janes at the 2020 Brit Awards. On 13 November 2020, Vogue revealed the cover of their December issue, featuring Styles as their first solo male cover star.

== Design and photography ==
The dress, worn by Styles on Vogue's cover, is a periwinkle blue-coloured lace gown with a ruffle trim and suivez-moi-jeune-homme ribbons; it was paired with a black double-breasted tuxedo jacket. Eliza Huber from Refinery29 drew similarities between the dress and other gowns in the Gucci Fall 2020 collection. The outfit was constructed by Michele, and the Vogue shoot was photographed by Tyler Mitchell. The creative vision for the shoot was rooted in androgynous fashion, with Lionel Wendt's 1930s homoerotic portraits of Sri Lankan men and Irving Penn's 1950s photographs of Dior and Balenciaga supermodels serving as inspirations. Other items of clothing featured in the shoot included a Harris Reed dress-and-trousers combination, a Comme des Garçons kilt, a Gucci pussy bow blouse, a Wales Bonner skirt, and a Maison Margiela trench coat.

== Reception ==
The dress was met with mixed reception. According to Grazia's Isabelle Truman, "thousands of people worldwide" praised Styles for challenging toxic masculinity and gender roles, emulating other musicians such as David Bowie, Freddie Mercury, Elton John, and Prince. Huber praised the shoot and thought that the dress was a natural progression of Styles's tendency to buck gender norms in fashion; she noted that he was not the first male celebrity to wear a dress, yet considered him the first to do so on a global level. Ailish Wallace-Buckland from The Spinoff stated that although "Black and brown queer, trans and non-binary people in particular have paved the way", Styles pushed the boundaries of men's fashion and its connections to masculinity due to his significant fame. Jireh Deng from NPR similarly thought that while Styles's "stylistic and artistic freedom" was worthy of praise, it was a privilege not typically granted to individuals in the LGBTQ community.

Several conservative political commentators criticised the outfit for defying gendered fashion standards. Ben Shapiro said it was "a referendum on masculinity for men to wear floofy dresses", and Piers Morgan on Good Morning Britain called the dress "a bit weird" and asked, "why do men need to wear dresses?" In a tweet, commentator Candace Owens called the dress an "outright attack" on society and demanded to "bring back manly men." Styles later shared an image of himself eating a banana and wearing a baby blue suit with a ruffled blouse, accompanied by the caption "bring back manly men", referencing Owens's tweet. Several progressive public figures defended Styles following the conservative criticism, including politician Alexandria Ocasio-Cortez, actress Olivia Wilde, activist Jameela Jamil, and actor Elijah Wood.

Black gay actor Billy Porter and non-binary performance artist Alok Vaid-Menon both expressed mixed feelings about the Vogue cover. The latter conveyed their happiness at witnessing Styles being honoured for openly defying gendered fashion standards, but believed that "white men should [not] be upheld as the face of gender neutral fashion" because "trans femmes of color started this and continue to face the backlash from it". In an interview in October 2021, Porter offered a more scathing critique of Styles and the cover: "He doesn't care, he's just doing it because it's the thing to do. This is politics for me. This is my life. [...] All he has to do is be white and straight." He later apologized for centering Styles in the conversation.

== Legacy ==
The dress cemented Styles's status as a fashion icon, (Note: Attributed to multiple references:) and he was voted GQ's "Most Stylish Man of the Year" in 2020. He was inducted as part of The Business of Fashion's "Class of 2022", an index of people that shaped the global fashion industry. Singer Charlotte Sands wrote a song called "Dress", inspired by the Vogue cover look; it went viral on TikTok and has been added to over 37,000 Spotify playlists.

From 19 March to 6 November 2022, the blue dress was featured at the Victoria and Albert Museum in London as part of their Fashioning Masculinities: The Art of Menswear exhibition. It was displayed alongside a wedding dress worn by drag queen Bimini Bon-Boulash on the second series of RuPaul's Drag Race UK and a black dress worn by Porter at the 91st Academy Awards. In 2024, the National Portrait Gallery in London featured a portrait of Styles wearing the dress as part of their History Makers exhibition, honouring individuals who have impacted contemporary culture.

== See also ==
- List of individual dresses
- Queer fashion
