= Harris Reed =

British-American fashion designer

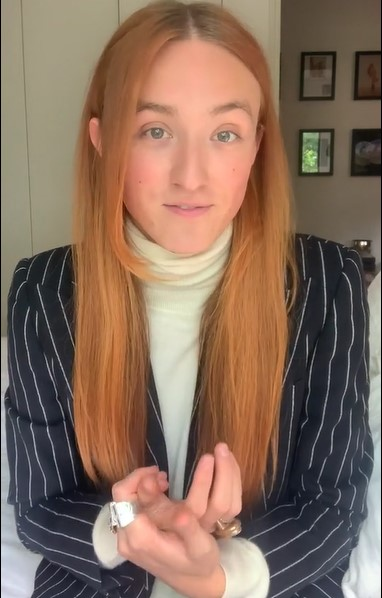
- Reed in 2020.
- Education: Central St. Martin's
- Occupation: Fashion designer
- Parents: Nicholas Reed (father); Lynette Reed (mother)
- Website: harrisreed.com

Harris Reed is a British-American fashion designer and creative director for French fashion house Nina Ricci. He is the son of the Oscar-winning, British documentary film producer Nicholas Reed and the American model and candlemaker Lynette Reed.

== Style ==
Reed is best known for creating gender fluid designs that often play with themes of masculinity and femininity. He describes his aesthetic as "Romanticism gone non-binary" and refers to his work as "demi-couture," being handmade but composed of affordable materials. Trademark features of Reed's design work include the fusion of traditionally masculine forms with sculptural skirts or dresses, and his work is often accessorized with extravagantly large hats or headpieces.

== Education ==
Reed attended public high school at The Center School in Seattle. Reed is a 2020 graduate of Central Saint Martin's in London. Due to shutdowns caused by the COVID-19 pandemic, he had to design and produce garments without access to the school's facilities. His final collection before graduation – produced in his London apartment using a £20 iron, a Singer sewing machine ordered online, DIY glue, and a discarded foam mannequin that he found by a skip – debuted in British Vogue and was showcased virtually via Instagram. Around that time, Reed also debuted a line of scented candles designed in collaboration with his mother, Lynette Reed. After graduation, Reed accepted an invitation to be the designer-in-residence at The Standard Hotel in London, a position he shared with Chet Lo.

== Career ==
When British singer and actor Harry Styles became the first man to be featured on the cover of Vogue magazine in December 2020, Reed was tapped by Anna Wintour to design an outfit for the feature article: a tailored suit with a hoopskirt dress. Styles' high-profile appearance in Reed's dress on the cover of Vogue sparked both controversy and celebration for the ways that the garment challenges gender norms in clothing.

In 2021, Reed was awarded "Breakthrough Designer" in GQ magazine's annual "Men of the Year" awards. That year, Reed collaborated with Dolce & Gabbana, dressing the supermodel Iman for the 2021 Met Gala and accompanying her to the event in a matching outfit. His gender-neutral clothing collection was modeled at the first-ever gender-neutral London Fashion Week that September, and he also launched a line of jewelry with Missoma and collaborated with MAC cosmetics to issue the Harris Reed x MAC Collection.

In 2022, Reed's work was selected for inclusion at the Victoria and Albert Museum in London as part of the museum's first-ever exhibition dedicated to menswear, Fashioning Masculinities: The Art of Menswear. In the exhibit, an outfit that Reed designed and modeled in 2017 is juxtaposed with the clothing featured in a 1753 portrait of French writer Jacques Cazotte, as painted by French portraitist Jean-Baptiste Perronneau.

Reed was appointed creative director of Nina Ricci in September 2022, becoming the youngest designer to hold the position in the house's history. His work there adapted the dramatic silhouettes and gender-fluid approach of his independent label to the production resources and archive of an established Paris fashion house.

Besides frequent collaborator Harry Styles, many other notable individuals have worn Reed's designs, including Beyoncé, Nicki Minaj, Solange Knowles, Adele, Selena Gomez, Shakira, Miley Cyrus, Ezra Miller, Troye Sivan, Olly Alexander, Tommy Dorfman, and Emma Watson. His work has been featured in Vogue, GQ, The New York Times, The New Yorker, Vanity Fair, Marie Claire, Elle, Cosmopolitan, and Harper's Bazaar, among other publications.

Reed cites many wide-ranging influences, including Belgian fashion designer Ann Demeulemeester, British aristocrat Henry Paget, British performer Lindsay Kemp, British singer David Bowie, the American rock band the New York Dolls, Romanticism, and glam rock.
