= Definition of Fear =

- Directed by: James Simpson
- Written by: James Simpson
- Produced by: Christopher Branch; James Simpson; Barry Cook; Leighton Lloyd; Robert Menzies
- Starring: Jacqueline Fernandez; Katherine Barrell; Mercedes Papalia; Blythe Hubbard
- Production company: DoF Film Limited
- Distributed by: Universal Pictures
- Release dates: 5 December 2015 (Delhi International Film Festival); 31 January 2018 (DVD)
- Country: United Kingdom
- Language: English

Definition of Fear is a 2015 British horror thriller film written and directed by British filmmaker James Simpson, starring Jacqueline Fernandez. The film premiered at the 4th Delhi International Film Festival in December 2015. The film was released on DVD on 30 January 2018. A first look trailer was released online.

Definition of Fear was the North American debut of Bollywood star Fernandez.

== Plot ==
Psychology student Sarah Fording arranges a girls' trip to a lakeside cabin, but doesn't tell her friends the trip is actually a research project into manipulated fear. After planting a Ouija board in the cabin and talking about eerie noises, Sarah secretly films their reactions. Then frightening things start happening for real.

== Cast ==
- Jacqueline Fernandez as Sarah Fording – a psychology student
- Katherine Barrell as Victoria Burns – a dancer
- Mercedes Papalia as Frankie Toms – a personal trainer
- Blythe Hubbard as Rachel Moore – a singer

== Production ==
=== Filming ===
Filming began on 10 October 2014, in Ottawa, Ontario, Canada.

== Release ==
Definition of Fear screened at film festivals in India, the US, and UK in 2015 and 2016. It was scheduled for theatrical release in India in August 2018, with the date later reported as uncertain.
