= Christopher Branch (filmmaker) =

British film maker

Christopher Branch is a British film maker. He is perhaps best known for producing Academy Award winning documentary film The Lady in Number 6. As of October 2014 he is producing Definition of Fear, starring Jacqueline Fernandez.

== Filmography ==
Motion Picture	Year	Role
Definition of Fear	2015	producer
The Lady in Number 6	2014	producer
Ambushed	2013	executive producer
The Devil's in the Details	2013	executive producer
Labor Pains	2000	co-executive producer
