= Katherine Barrell =

Canadian actress

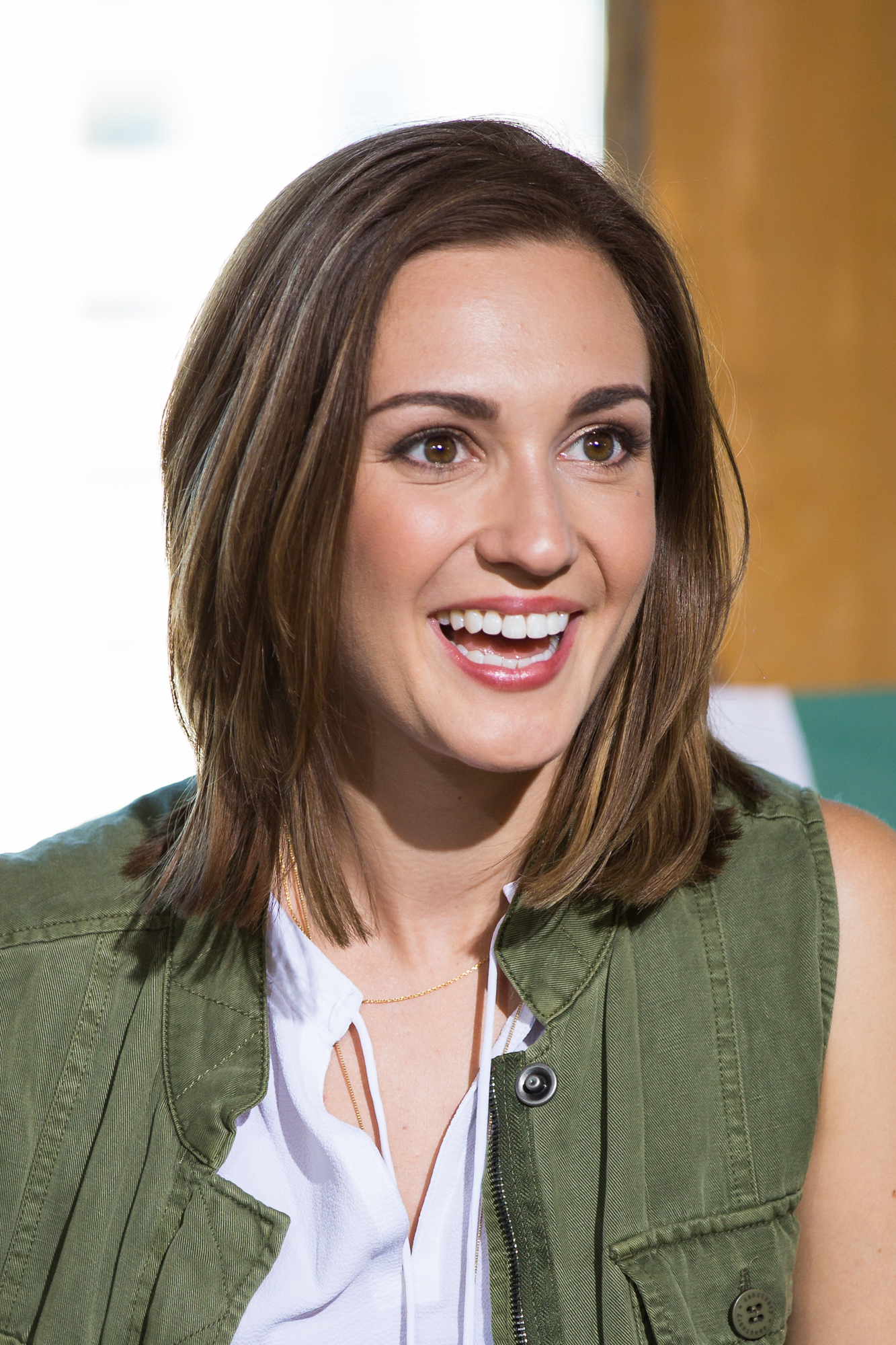
- Born: Toronto, Ontario, Canada
- Other name: Kat Barrell
- Occupations: Actor, producer, director, screenwriter
- Years active: 2011–present
- Known for: Wynonna Earp
- Spouse: Ray Galletti (m. 2017)
- Children: 2
- Awards: Cogeco Fund Audience Choice Award 2020
- Website: katherinebarrell.com

Katherine Barrell (born February 12) is a Canadian actress, writer, producer, and director. She is best known for her role as Sheriff Nicole Haught in the Syfy supernatural weird West television series Wynonna Earp. In 2020, she joined the cast of the fantasy comedy-drama television series Good Witch as Joy Harper.

== Early life ==
Barrell was born in Toronto, Ontario, Canada, to a Slovenian mother. She attended Assumption Catholic Secondary School in Burlington, Ontario, where she had a lead role in two school plays, in addition to collaborating with a friend on a play in which they wrote, directed and acted together. She directed her high school's production of The Wizard of Oz and was a member of Burlington Student Theatre for two years. She started studying musical theatre at Sheridan College then transferred to George Brown College to study filmmaking and acting at the School of Media & Performing Arts, graduating in 2010. She also did some training at The Groundlings comedy school.

== Career ==
Barrell's television work includes made-for-TV movies Poe (2011) as Rowena, and Girls Night Out (2017) as Sadie. Guest appearances include Lost Girl in the episode "Table for Fae" (2012) as Maisie; Murdoch Mysteries in episodes "Murdoch in Toyland" (2012) as Marley Rosevear, and "The Murdoch Appreciation Society" (2014) as Ruby Rosevear; Saving Hope in the episode "Can't You Hear Me Knocking?" (2015) as Dixie Kolesnyk. Along with her role as Sheriff Nicole Haught in Wynonna Earp, Barrell appears in Workin' Moms in the recurring role of Alicia Rutherford.

Film roles include Jaqueline Gill in The Scarehouse (2014), Mary in My Ex-Ex (2015), and Victoria Burns in Definition of Fear (2015).

Her production company, Kit Media, produced several short films and her 2013 comedy short Issues was recognized as one of the top short films of the year by Richard Crouse. Kit Media was rebranded as Blue Eyed Bandit in 2018.

Barrell's ensemble film Dissecting Gwen, based on her own story, won the 2017 Best Screenplay Award by Women in Film & Television – Toronto, and was awarded Best Comedy Short by the 2017 Canadian Diversity Film Festival.

== Personal life ==
Barrell is an advocate for the "Pink Box Program" by GIRL TALK Empowerment, a Canadian organization that "inspires, empowers and mobilizes girls to become world-changers".

She is married to actor Ray Galletti, whom she met on the set of My Ex-Ex. They became engaged in 2016 and married in 2017.

In July 2019, Barrell publicly took part in an article for Diva Magazine where she stated in an interview, "I am attracted to both men and women and the person I fell in love with is a man...I wish it could just be about the human I am in love with, not their gender."

On September 8, 2021, Barrell gave birth to her son, Ronin Barrell Galletti. On May 21, 2024, Barrell gave birth to her daughter Celeste Monique Barrell Galletti.

== Filmography ==
=== Film ===
Year	Title	Role	Notes
2011	Queen of Clubs	Joker	Short film; also writer
2013	Lost and Found	Ellen	Short film
2013	The Ties Between Us	Amy	Short film
2013	Issues	Rachel Stephens	Short film; also producer
2014	The Scarehouse	Jaqueline Gill	
2015	Canadian Star	Herself	Documentary
2015	My Ex-Ex	Mary	
2015	Definition of Fear	Victoria Burns	

=== Television ===
Year	Title	Role	Notes
2011	Poe	Rowena	TV film
2012	Lost Girl	Maisie	Episode: "Table for Fae"
2012	Murdoch Mysteries	Marley Rosevear	Episode: "Murdoch in Toyland"
2012	Off2Kali Comedy	Various	Episode: "Indian Guy + White Name = PROBLEM!"
2014	Reign	Pretty Servant Girl	Episode: "Long Live the King"
2014	The Listener	Alya King	Episode: "Dancing with the Enemy"
2014	Murdoch Mysteries	Ruby Rosevear	Episode: "The Murdoch Appreciation Society"
2015	Saving Hope	Dixie Kolesnyk	Episode: "Can't You Hear Me Knocking?"
2016–2021	Wynonna Earp	Nicole Haught	Recurring role, seasons 1–2; main role, season 3–4
2016	A Nutcracker Christmas	Beth James	TV film
2017–2021	Workin' Moms	Alicia Rutherford	Recurring role, seasons 1–2; guest role, seasons 4–5
2017	Girls Night Out	Sadie	TV film
2017	Star Trek: Discovery	Stella Grimes	Episode: "Magic to Make the Sanest Man Go Mad"
2018	Lake Placid: Legacy	Jade	TV film
2018	Private Eyes	Whitney Malone	Episode: "Brew the Right Thing"
2020–2021	Good Witch	Joy Harper	Main role
2021	A Godwink Christmas: Miracle of Love	Joy Fickett	TV film
2022	Cabin Connection	Hannah Monroe	TV film
2022	A Tale of Two Christmases	Emma	TV film
2023	Making Scents of Love	Shay Robson	Streaming film
2023	Everything Christmas	Tory Fry	TV film
2024	Shifting Gears	Jess Barro	TV film
2025	The Christmas Baby	Kelly Townsend	TV film

=== Production ===
Year	Title	Director	Writer	Producer	Notes
2012	Roomies			Yes	Short film
2013	New Domain			Co-producer	Short film
2013	The Change	First assistant			Short film
2014	The Truth About Rainbows			Co-producer	Short film
2015	Mature Young Adults	Post-production		Yes	Short film Completed by Katherine Barrell after death of director Kent Nolan.
2015	The Offer			Production coordinator	Short film
2016	Dissecting Gwen	Yes	Story by	Yes	Short film Winner, Best Screenplay, Women in Film & Television – Toronto; Winner, Best Comedy Short, Canadian Diversity Film Festival
2016	Cannonball	Yes	Yes	Yes	Short film
2017	Breakdown	Yes	Story by		Short film
2023	Flipping for Christmas	Yes			TV film

=== Music video ===
Year	Title	Role	Artist	Notes
2017	"Something About Your Love"	Backup vocalist	ColinResponse	

== Awards and nominations ==
Year	Award	Category	Nominated work	Result	Ref
2019	Canadian Screen Awards	Audience Choice Award	Wynonna Earp	Nominated	
2020	Canadian Screen Awards	Audience Choice Award	Wynonna Earp	Won	
