= The Lady in Number 6 =

The Lady in Number 6: Music Saved My Life
- Film poster
- Directed by: Malcolm Clarke
- Written by: Malcolm Clarke; Carl Freed
- Produced by: Malcolm Clarke; Nicholas Reed; Christopher Branch
- Starring: Alice Herz-Sommer
- Narrated by: Malcolm Clarke
- Cinematography: Kieran Crilly
- Edited by: Carl Freed
- Music by: Luc St. Pierre
- Production company: Reed Entertainment/Bunbury Films
- Distributed by: Netflix
- Release date: 2013
- Running time: 39 minutes
- Countries: Canada; United States; United Kingdom
- Language: English

The Lady in Number 6: Music Saved My Life is an Academy Award-winning 2013 documentary-short film directed, written and produced by Malcolm Clarke.

The Lady In Number 6: Music Saved My Life tells the story of Alice Herz-Sommer, a German-speaking Jewish pianist from Prague who was at her death the world's oldest Holocaust survivor. In the documentary, she discusses the importance of music, laughter, and how to have an optimistic outlook on life. Herz (1903–2014) died at age 110, one week before the 86th Academy Awards.

== Awards ==
Awards
Award	Date of ceremony	Category	Recipients and nominees	Result
Academy Awards	March 2, 2014	Best Documentary – Short Subject	Malcolm Clarke; Nicholas Reed	Won
Liverpool Lift-Off Film Festival	March 3, 2014	Best Short Documentary	Malcolm Clarke; Nicholas Reed	Won
