= Chet Lo =

American fashion designer (born 1997)

- Born: 1997 (age 28–29); New York City, US
- Education: Central Saint Martins (BA)
- Occupations: Fashion designer; businessman

Chet Lo (born 1997) is an American fashion designer who resides in London. He is best known for his eponymous fashion brand, which puts out collections largely of his signature spiky knitwear. He is also known for his collaborations with brands including Singaporean fashion house Charles & Keith, American lifestyle brand Converse, and app platform Tinder. His outfits have been worn by individuals including American musicians Lizzo, Doja Cat, MGK, and SZA.

== Early life ==
Lo was born in New York City in 1997 to immigrants from Hong Kong. His mother is Mai-Wah Cheung, a computer scientist who served as CIO of Univision. He was brought up as a Buddhist. After high school, he moved to London, where he attended Central Saint Martins, a constituent college of the University of Arts London, and earned a BA in Knitwear. He interned at womenswear brand Proenza Schouler and under designer John Galliano at fashion house Maison Margiela. His graduate collection, Cnidaria's Wife, was described as "futuristic" by Vogue Hong Kong. Lo resides in Hoxton. He describes his sexuality as queer and has a boyfriend.

== Career ==
After his graduation during the COVID-19 pandemic, Lo struggled to find a job, so decided to launch his own label. The label was soon picked up by incubator Fashion East. He also shared an artist residency at The Standard hotel in London with British-American fashion designer Harris Reed.

Lo specializes in knitwear. His designs are known for their spikes, which are inspired by the durian fruit and made using monofilament yarn. He began working on this style during his second year of fashion school. His first design incorporating these spikes was a sweater he made for personal use. He has cited old Japanese comics, Godzilla and Ultraman visuals, the 1988 film Akira, and the anime Neon Genesis Evangelion as influences on his style. His designs have been described by South China Morning Post and The Zoe Report as futuristic and alien, often with a "bubbly" color scheme. His company produces only the exact number of items purchased.

Lo had his first London Fashion Week show in Spring 2022,which was facilitated by the British Fashion Council NEWGEN program. The show featured a collection titled "Splash", inspired by his longing for a tropical oasis. His Fall 2022 line, titled "The Tundra", had a vibe he described as "a hoe never gets cold". He also described it as "après-chic". His Spring/Summer 2023 collection, "Bai Sun", was inspired by his Buddhist upbringing and featured a collaboration with tech company Nothing. His Fall/Winter 2023 collection "Bioluminescence" used a dark color palette, taking inspiration from the traditional Chinese clothing hanfu.

His Spring 2024 collection, "Haam Sap", was inspired by Shunga and Chinese erotic art and explored his sexuality as a queer Asian. His Fall 2024 show was titled "Terracotta" and inspired by the Terracotta Army. His Spring/Summer 2025 collection was inspired by his mother. His Fall/Winter 2025 collection, "Modern Antiquity", was inspired by traditional Western depictions and misrepresentations of Asian art. He took a one-season break before returning with his Fall 2026 collection, which was inspired by a Hong Kong night market and a trip Lo took to Asia with his boyfriend, who had never previously been; the show featured a full night market built inside the venue. Both Spring/Summer 2025 and Fall 2026 were made to be inclusive to blind guests.

In 2024, Lo collaborated with Tinder to create "The Lovestruck Collection", inspired by modern dating and his own dating life. His other collaborations include: Converse, to develop footwear for "Modern Antiquity"; Spanish retailer Pull&Bear for a capsule collection; furniture brand Rankin Editions for a furniture collection; Charles & Keith to design headbands, purses, and shoes; and Capri-Sun to create a limited-edition bag to carry their juice pouches.

Lo's outfits have been worn by rapper Doja Cat, singers SZA, Dua Lipa, Zara Larsson, Lizzo, MGK, and Willow Smith, actresses Michaela Coel and Chloe Cherry, and socialite Kylie Jenner. His designs featured in Doja Cat's 2021 music video for "Kiss Me More". His Spring/Summer 2025 piece "Spiky Boatneck" is in the collection of the Costume Institute at the Metropolitan Museum of Art.

Lo was listed in Forbes 30 Under 30 in 2022, The Smiley Company Future Positive Creators in 2023, and the Drapers 30 Under 30 in 2025. His collections are a mainstay at the semi-annual London Fashion Week.

In 2022, Lo accused an unnamed fast fashion company of copying his designs. Although the brand was not specified, Instagram watchdog Diet Prada said it was H&M. This was supported by Instagram insinuations made by fellow-designer Harris Reed.
