= Alessandro Michele =

Italian fashion designer (born 1972)

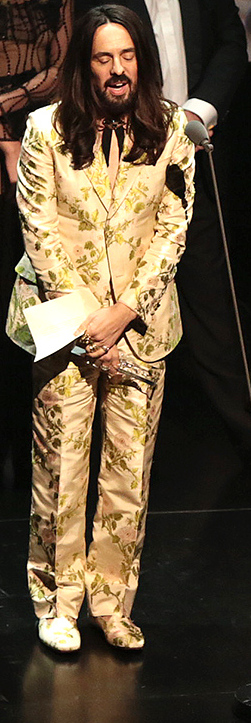
- Michele in 2015
- Born: 25 November 1972 (age 53); Rome, Italy
- Occupation: Fashion designer
- Years active: 1994–present
- Title: Creative director of Valentino
- Partner: Giovanni Attili

Alessandro Michele (Italian pronunciation: [miˈkɛːle]; born 25 November 1972) is an Italian fashion designer and creative director of Valentino. He grew to international recognition as the creative director of Gucci, the Italian fashion luxury house where he worked from 2002 to 2022. Known for his maximalist designs, Alessandro Michele revived Gucci's popularity, most notably with a Geek-Chic aesthetic. He had been responsible for all of Gucci's collections and global brand image from January 2015 until he stepped down from the role in November 2022.

== Biography ==
=== Early life ===
Alessandro Michele grew up in Rome. His father was an Alitalia technician, and his mother an assistant to a movie executive.

In the early 1990s, Michele completed his studies of fashion design at the Accademia di Costume e di Moda in Rome, where he learned to design both theatrical costumes and fashion wear.

=== Career ===
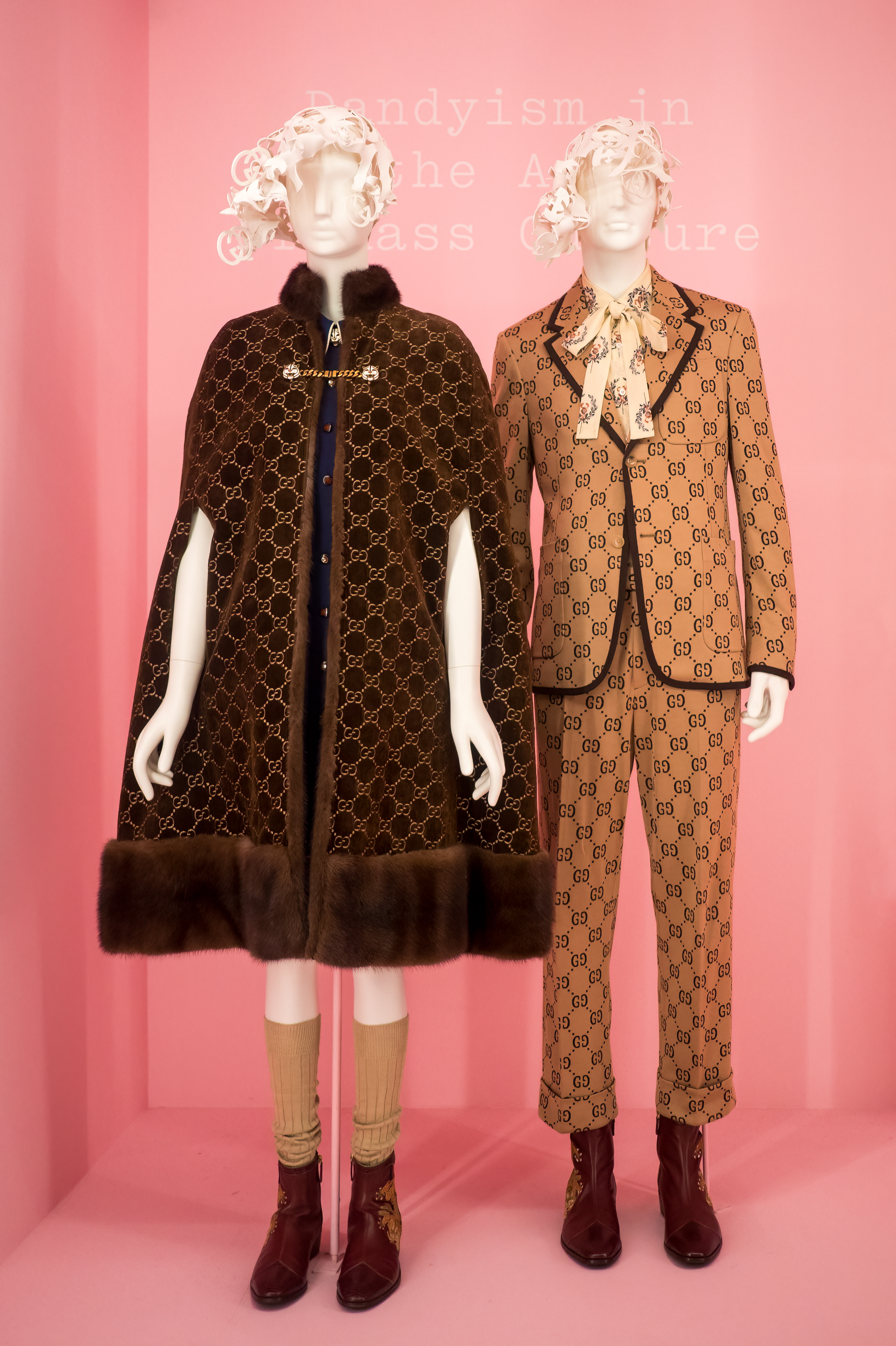
Two ensembles by Michele for Gucci on display during The Met's exhibit Camp: Notes on Fashion

In 1994, Michele left Rome to work in Les Copains, an Italian knitwear firm based in Bologna. Three years later in 1997, he joined Silvia Venturini Fendi and Karl Lagerfeld at luxury house Fendi. He worked with Frida Giannini and was appointed senior accessories designer, in charge of the brand's leather goods.

In 2002, Tom Ford, Gucci's creative director from 1994 to 2004, invited Michele to work at the firm's London-based design office. He was originally in charge of the company's handbag designs. In 2006, Michele was named senior designer of Gucci leather goods, and in 2011, was promoted associate creative director to Frida Giannini, creative director of Gucci since 2005. In 2014, the Italian designer also became creative director of Richard Ginori, the Florentine porcelain brand acquired by Gucci in June 2013.

=== Creative director of Gucci ===
In January 2015, Marco Bizzarri asked Michele to act as interim creative designer for the January menswear show, giving him a week to reshape Frida Giannini's original designs. Michele accepted the challenge and introduced a “new Gucci: nonconformist, romantic, intellectual”. Two days later, Kering appointed Alessandro Michele creative director of Gucci, with the goal to reinvent Gucci's props amid deflating sales. A month later, Michele introduced a "sophisticated, intellectual and androgynous feel" for Gucci during his first women's collection show.

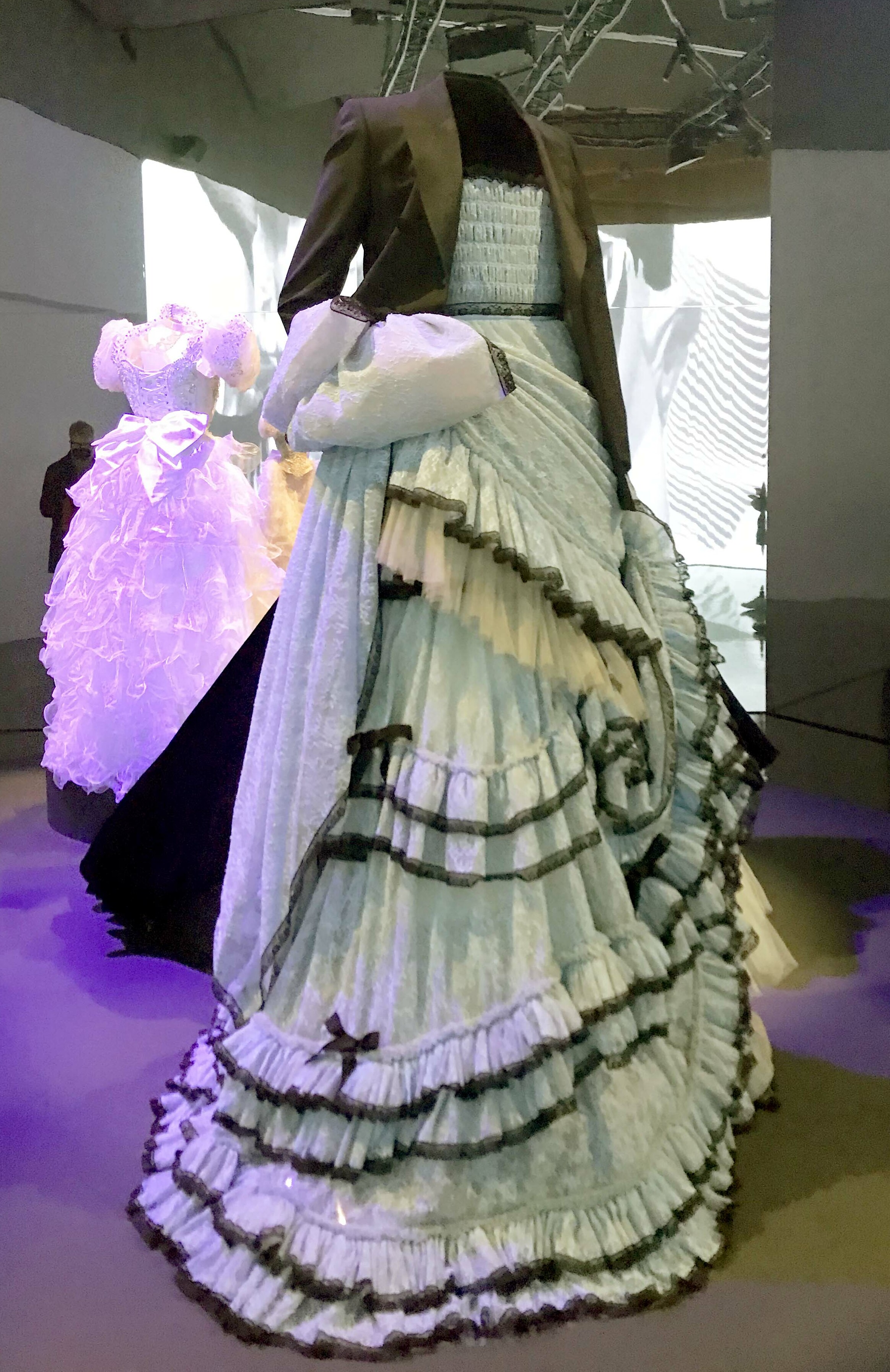
A custom blue Gucci dress created by Alessandro Michele for Harry Styles was on display in the Victoria and Albert Museum in 2022 for an exhibit called "Fashioning Masculinities: The Art of Menswear."

While creating iconic products, such as the Dionysus handbag, Michele also reintroduced Gucci classics including the double-G logo. He moved away from Tom Ford's "Sexy Gucci" props and feminized Gucci's menswear ("you can be more masculine showing your femininity"). He reused the "My Body My Choice" slogan, the embroidered uterus design, and the "22.05.1978" date (the date on which abortion became protected by Italian courts), transforming the brand into a postgender proposition. He added a dramatic Renaissance component to Gucci's spirit, replaced the modernist furniture of the Palazzo Alberini-Cicciaporci (Gucci's design headquarters in Rome) with antiques, and chose buildings of historic significance for his theatrical shows.

In 2016, for the Gucci Museum in Florence, Michele curated two additional rooms dedicated to Tom Ford's collections. Since the 2018 opening of the Gucci Wooster Bookstore in New York, Michele seasonally contributes to the curation of the shop's items. In October 2018, he co-curated with Maurizio Cattelan the 2-month Gucci art exhibition "The Artist is Present" in Shanghai.

In 2019, Michele revived Gucci's Beauty collection, and Gucci launched its first fine jewelry collection, which he designed.

In March 2024, Michele was appointed as the creative director of Italian fashion house Valentino. His appointment follows the departure of Pierpaolo Piccioli, who had worked at Valentino for 25 years.

== Work ==
Michele's father was also an avid artist who often took his son out to the museums. His family encouraged his interest in fashion at an early age. As a teenager, he read British magazines and was a fan of London's post-punk and New Romantic street style. His designs have been described as eclectic, flamboyant and maximalist, almost psychedelic, and drawn from several influences that span from cinema and theatrics to post-punk, crochet and glamour.

Michele refers to himself as an art archaeologist - historicist of garments - rather than a creative director, considering that clothes are meaningless without a historic context. In his fashion Renaissance process, he explores how adornment and embellishment was used over the centuries, bringing a kaleidoscopic mix of times and cultures that resonates with Gilles Deleuze's idea of "assemblage".

== Personal life ==
He lives in Rome with his longtime partner, professor of urban planning, Giovanni Attili.

== Prizes and awards ==
- 2015: International Fashion Designer Of The Year Award at the British Council Fashion Awards
- 2016: Council of Fashion Designers of America Awards
- 2016 International Accessories Designer of the Year Award at the British Council Fashion Awards
- 2016: GQ Men Of The Year Award for best designer
- 2017: Listed in Hypebeast's HB100
- 2017: Time 100 Most Influential People

== See also ==
- List of Italian designers
