= Nicholas Reed =

British filmmaker

- Born: 18 June 1963 (age 63); Gibraltar, UK
- Occupation: Film producer

Nicholas Reed (born 18 June 1963) is a British documentary film producer, media, entertainment and technology entrepreneur, with interests in film finance, viral video marketing, motion picture and television production. Reed and fellow producer Malcolm Clarke won the Academy Award for Best Documentary (Short Subject) for the 2013 film The Lady in Number 6: Music Saved My Life.

Reed was born in Gibraltar on 18 June 1963 and is the owner of Reed Entertainment. He is also co-owner of Science Film and Technology Company, Kallisti Media, and a founding partner in Los Angeles based content and strategy video marketing company, Shareability. He was formerly the Head of Motion Picture Literary at International Creative Management.

Nick has been involved with such films as My Big Fat Greek Wedding, the Austin Powers I, II and III, Elizabeth, Training Day, Bridget Jones's Diary, Moulin Rouge!, Bourne Identity franchise, Monster's Ball, White Noise, Underworld I, II and III, Meet the Parents, Meet the Fockers, Borat, Live Free or Die Hard, and Prince of Persia: The Sands of Time, among many others. He was also involved with development and production of CSI television series for CBS Entertainment.
