= Ben Turnbull =

British artist

- Born: 7 April 1974 (age 52); Isleworth, London, England
- Website: www.benturnbull.co.uk

Ben Turnbull is a British artist best known for his collages which focus on American culture and politics, and most notably his I Don't Like Mondays series (2008), a title taken from a remark made by Brenda Spencer, the perpetrator of the Cleveland Elementary School shooting (San Diego) and featured various weapons carved into school desks, a commentary on gun massacres in U.S. schools.

America and Americana are a staple of Turnbull's work – he has visited the country many times. In the various series it has inspired, a fierce critique of U.S culture is witnessed, in particular its politics, but also an affection and fascination which began from his boyhood when he was, like many of his generation, brought up on a diet of American TV programmes. This style has been dubbed ‘angry pop’, an allusion to its power and harnessing of Pop Art sensibilities. His Superman series, is in part a tribute in part to the New York City fireman who lost their lives after the 9/11 attacks.

Turnbull has exhibited with a number of galleries, including two with Steve Lazarides, the gallerist best known for his early championing of graffiti art and in particular his association with Banksy. He has also had a retrospective at Lancaster Institute for the Contemporary Arts (2012), and more recently a solo show at Saatchi Gallery (2017).

Turnbull did not attend art school. His early adult life was spent as a fabricator – he ran his own business, and, among other projects, he helped create interiors of some of the most iconic London restaurants of the 1990s. This ability to ‘make things’ himself, unique amongst artists, is reflected in the exacting production of all his work.

== Bibliography ==
- U.S vs Them. Publisher: Steve Lazarides, London 2017. ISBN 978-0-9554178-2-5
- A Nightmare On Greek Street. Publisher: Steve Lazarides, London 2018. ISBN 978-0-9556726-6-8
- Outsiders: Art by people. Publisher: Random House UK, April 2009. ISBN 978-1846055461
