= Lifewater International =

Christian organization

Lifewater International is a non-profit Christian water development organization serving the world's rural poor through integrated water, sanitation, and hygiene programs. In 47 years, Lifewater has served over 3 million people in 45 countries.

Lifewater has Global Headquarters in Bentonville, Arkansas and Addis Ababa, Ethiopia, with field offices in Uganda, Ethiopia, and Cambodia.

In 2024, Lifewater merged with Water for Good, another Christian Water Access, Sanitation, and Hygiene non-profit. The CEO of the combined entity will be Lifewater CEO, David LeVan, with headquarters remaining in Bentonville and Addis Ababa.

== History ==
Lifewater was founded by William A. Ashe in 1977. Owner of a water pump business, the Ashe family started taking trips to Mexico to promote water and sanitation to those in need in the 1960s. Over time, these small family trips grew to include other volunteer water professionals.

Ashe officially established the Lifewater name in 1977. Ashe attended a Billy Graham conference in Amsterdam in 1983 and received over 2,000 requests for safe water from pastors and evangelists in over 100 countries.

In 1984 Lifewater became a registered California non-profit corporation and in 1986 was granted tax-exempt 501(c)(3) status by the IRS. Throughout the 1980s and 1990s, Lifewater used volunteers to serve thousands of communities around the world with safe water, adding improved sanitation and hygiene practices to its list of essential services as their necessity became more apparent. As Ashe transitioned the organization from volunteers to professional staff, Lifewater collaborated with ministries in-country to advance the cause of WASH (Water, Sanitation, Hygiene) and promote Christianity to those in need.

== Service Areas and Populations ==
Lifewater operates in Tanzania, Uganda, Cambodia, and Ethiopia, and through Water For Good, in Central African Republic. Lifewater begins with Least Developed Countries and staff conduct on-the-ground research to identify regions in those countries with the greatest need for WASH.

In 2019, the organization served over 174,596 people and completed 207 water sources.

While much of Lifewater's work has focused on developing countries, it has also become involved in helping Ukrainians during the Russian invasion of Ukraine. To help Ukrainian refugees get the water they need to survive, Lifewater Canada partnered with a non-profit organization that trucks water and other necessities from Poland into Ukraine.

== Strategy ==
Lifewater professional team of water technicians are trained to use shallow and deep drilling rigs to reach water under the surface. In some cases, spring caps, rain catchment systems, or cisterns are more appropriate. Local water committees are trained and to care for the water source, collect user fees to save for needed repairs, and carry out frequent maintenance.

To improve sanitation, Lifewater uses the Community-Led Total Sanitation program to show communities the importance of good sanitation, and help communities achieve open defecation free (ODF) status. Households must build their own ventilated improved pit (VIP) latrine, and larger latrine blocks are built at schools.

To improve hygiene, Lifewater teaches about the importance of handwashing with soap, keeping water safe, keeping households free of waste, and drying dishes in clean areas.

== Finances ==
In FY 2018, Lifewater received $6,118,092 in donations. The organization reports that 83.1% of this revenue is from contributions, gifts, and grants and 16.9% are from fundraising events. In 2023, the combined Lifewater and Water For Good organizations raised over $14M.

Lifewater reports that 80% of all donations go to programs, 10% to fundraising, and 10% to administrative costs.
