= Carmen Busquets =

Venezuelan entrepreneur

- Occupations: Entrepreneur, philanthropist, investor
- Website: www.carmenbusquets.com

Carmen Busquets is a Venezuelan entrepreneur, philanthropist and investor who was an early champion of the fashion-tech space. She was the co-founder and founding investor in Net-a-Porter. Since 1992, Busquets has invested £50 million in fashion-tech companies in the United Kingdom and the United States, generating an estimated 10,000 jobs.

Busquets opened a boutique named Cabus in Caracas, Venezuela in 1990. With returns from technology stocks that she sold prior to the 2000 "dot-com" crash, she became a co-founder and founding investor in Net-a-Porter after meeting founder Natalie Massenet. Busquets also had a belief Net-a-Porter would be successful having previously sold luxury fashion to clients via photographs through her boutique, Cabus in the pre-internet age.

Net-a-Porter's sale to Compagnie Financière Richemont in 2010 netted Busquets over 16 times her initial investment. In 2012, Busquets founded Cabus Venture, a dedicated investment vehicle to finance entrepreneurs within the luxury and fashion community and commerce offerings. She was an early investor in New Age pioneer Deepak Chopra in the 1980s. Busquets is known as a vocal proponent of sustainability, focussing on impact investment and sustainable businesses.

Busquets' current portfolio includes Moda Operandi, Farfetch, Lyst, The Business of Fashion, Cult Beauty, FLOWERBX and Tagwalk.

== Early life and education ==
Busquets was born in Venezuela. She is dyslexic and partly deaf. She was educated in Venezuela, England, Canada and the United States. She studied science and arts before concentrating on marketing and advertising at the University of Miami.

After graduating from the University of Miami, she wanted to pursue a career in art and received a scholarship to attend Parsons at age 17. However, she changed her direction after the death of her brother and returned to her native country. Despite being expected to work in her family's metallurgic businesses, she decided to establish a fashion boutique called Cabus in 1990. Through the business, she established relationships with brands like Chanel, Thierry Mugler and Alaïa.

== Career ==
=== Early career ===
In 1990, Busquets opened a high fashion boutique in Caracas, Venezuela called Cabus. Following a 10-year ban on foreign imports, it became the first store in Venezuela to stock Europe's top designers and rapidly developed an international client base. The ambience echoed Chanel's store in Paris; the clothes came from more than 50 designers. The clientèle quickly became international, and Busquets provided a service to match. Busquets would visit shows in Europe and use DHL to send her customers sketches, Polaroids and detailed descriptions of garments she thought they would like. "That's why I knew Net-a-Porter would succeed. I had already been providing an analogue version of what Natalie wanted to do."

In 1997, at the beginning of the dot-com bubble, Busquets started to build her small private stock-portfolio of Internet investments. She also co-founded two private online start-ups during the Internet bubble, an experience that taught her the importance of being a responsible investor and only partnering with other responsible investors.

=== Net-a-Porter ===
Busquets was a co-founder investor and an original board director of Net-a-Porter, investing an initial £250,000 in 2000 against the opinion of her advisers. While backing Net-a-Porter, Busquets personally vouched for its creditworthiness to designers with whom she had long-standing relationships. In 2003, realising the importance of securing a strategic partner for the company, she temporarily gave up her pre-emptive investor rights in order to let Richemont Group become a co-investor. She gained her rights back once Richemont had invested in the company. For seven years, Busquets and Richemont remained controlling co-investors, each with a 30% shareholding and both playing a pivotal role in growing the value of the company.

In 2010, Busquets exercised her controlling rights and was instrumental in the successful sale of Net-a-Porter to Richemont Group for £350 million. Busquets retained a 2.3% shareholding in the business until the Yoox Net-a-Porter merger in 2015. Busquet's initial investment of £250,000 was returned 100 times, and her £5.9 million investment was returned 16 times.

=== CoutureLab ===
In 2006, Busquets founded CoutureLab, an e-commerce gift website. Busquets's aim is to offer a selection of products, to support top creative talents and to educate consumers about the stories behind the products.

In April 2012, CoutureLab launched its gifting service GiftLab, increasing CoutureLab's range of products and establishing several key distribution partnerships online.

As of September 2016, CoutureLab evolved into an investment vehicle – now subsumed into carmenbusquets.com – for disruptive startups in fashion and luxury.

In September 2018, the CoutureLab Coalition, a new platform to support Latin American artisans and independent designers, was launched at Urban Zen in New York, at a cocktail reception hosted by Donna Karan. The initiative, made up of both people and businesses including Busquets, Livia Firth, Donna Karan, Petra Němcová and Lucy Siegle, aims to foster sustainable practices and improve the lives of artisans and creatives in Latin America.

== Funds ==
In 2019, Busquets joined the advisory board of venture capital fund Fernbrook Capital Management LLC which focuses on direct to consumer and tech brands, the majority of which are female founded and have a social good stance in their ethos.

Busquets also sits on the advisory boards of multiple venture capital funds including Felix Capital, Imaginary Ventures, Susa Capital and Kindred.

== Philanthropy ==
Busquets is known as a vocal proponent of sustainability and for her charitable work, notably with Bhutan for Life, Glasswing International and the Oslo Freedom Forum, through which she has supported victims of repression in Venezuela. Busquets is a goodwill ambassador to the United Nations and Fashion 4 Development, and a World Wildlife Fund council member. Busquets also works closely with non-profit organisation NEST that focuses on improving homeworking and preserving traditional craftmanship, as well as non-profit organisation PACUNAM.

== Awards and events ==
In May 2011, Busquets won the Individual Outstanding Achievement at the Luxury Briefing Awards. The award recognized her vision to invest in selling fashion online in the early days of the Internet, her substantial value addition to Net-a-Porter culminating in its successful sale, and the creation of CoutureLab, with its focus on craftsmanship. In 2012, Busquets was a member of the jury at the 16th annual Luxury Briefing Awards.

On 11 November 2011, Busquets spoke at the International Herald Tribune's Luxury Business Conference in São Paulo, Brazil. Busquets discussed how her Latin American background has equipped her with the skills required to achieve commercial success and her views on the union of sustainability, community and luxury.

On 19 March 2012 in Paris, Busquets and other notable figures from the luxury trade industry discussed the tension between global brands and luxury labels.

On 25 September 2018, Carmen was honoured for her humanitarian work and contributions to sustainability, and received the F4D award during Fashion 4 Development's 8th Annual Official First Ladies Luncheon for "recalibrating the fashion industry to the benefit of people and planet".

Busquets has been a member of the Panel of Experts for the LVMH Prize since 2017.

== Media ==
In July 2008, The New York Times quoted Busquets who was discussing Net-a-porter at Paris Fashion Week: "I never invested in Net-a-Porter with the thought that I would be one of the major investors. I was quite open to being one of the minor investors. But since nobody believed in Internet companies after 2000, it turned out that I had to be the major investor, because I was the only one to believe in it."

In August 2012, Wallpaper magazine published an article by Imran Amed, founder and editor of The Business of Fashion, reviewing London's growing technology and fashion scenes. Amed identifies Busquets as being among a handful of investors who: "cashed in during the UK's Internet 1.0 wave and are now actively investing in the next generation of start-ups."

In September 2012, The New York Times published "Fashion's New Order", a select list of 37 individuals including designers, retailers, editors and stylists who have "changed the way we see fashion in the 21st century".

In May 2013, Vogue profiled Busquets in an article written by Elisabetta Tudor regarding her investment in pre-owned fashion marketplace BuyMyWardrobe.

In September 2013, The Business of Fashion featured Busquets in the BoF 500: a list of the 500 most influential names in the global fashion industry. This new list was described as "an innovative, multi-channel initiative, exploring the people shaping the global fashion industry, curated by the editors of BoF and powered by social media."

In September 2016, The New York Times International profiled Busquets and identified that Busquets is often referred to "as the fairy godmother of fashion e-commerce".

In February 2020, ¡Hola! profiled Busquets who is quoted as saying she would like to eradicate the problem of fashion waste and make fashion brands produce only what is necessary. Busquets describes that with problems like climate change and waste of objects and food, "we [humankind] need to move forward as soon as possible towards a more circular economy, where we value everything we have."
