= Cettire =

Australian-owned online luxury fashion retail platform

- Type: Public
- Traded as: ASX: CTT
- Industry: E-commerce
- Founded: 2017
- Headquarters: Melbourne, Australia
- Key people: Dean Mintz, founder and CEO
- Products: Women's fashion, men's fashion, jewellery and accessories
- Website: cettire.com

Cettire is an Australian-owned, online luxury fashion retail platform selling clothing, shoes and accessories from over 1300 international high-end fashion brands.

== History ==
Founded in 2017 by Dean Mintz, Cettire was created by Ark Technologies, an incubator with a focus on developing technological innovation.

In December 2020, Cettire (CTT) listed on the Australian Securities Exchange (ASX) with a valuation of $190 million. The company raised $65 million at 50c per share via an initial public offering.

Cettire launched in China in June 2024.

== See also ==
- YOOX Net-a-Porter Group
- Farfetch
- SSENSE
- Mytheresa
- Luxury goods
