= Hugh Devlin Foundation =

UK-based not for profit organization

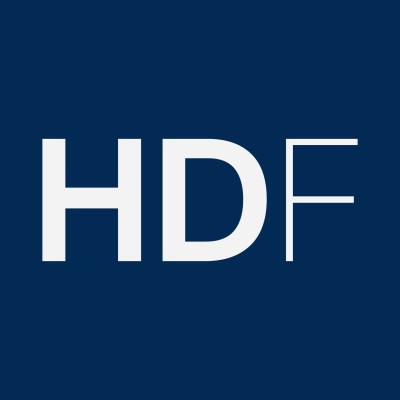
- Type: Not-for-profit organisation
- Industry: Art, design, fashion, beauty
- Founded: 2026
- Headquarters: London
- Key people: Jade Mitchell (director)
- Website: hughdevlinfoundation.org

The Hugh Devlin Foundation is a British not-for-profit organisation established in 2026 in honour of Hugh Devlin (1962-2023) to provide free legal and financial advice to professionals in the creative industries.

== Background ==
Hugh Devlin was a partner in London at the international law firm Withers, before founding his own consultancy, Delightful. He was widely known and respected among the creative industries for the support he gave, particularly in moments of crisis and emergency.

Following Hugh's sudden death in 2023, his wife Sarah Polden, alongside a number of friends and former clients, established the Hugh Devlin Foundation in his memory.

The foundation operates via a network of lawyers and accountants who offer legal and financial advice free of charge.

Founding members include Anya Hindmarch, Charlotte Tilbury, Graham Webster, Sarah Mower, Christopher Kane, Tammy Kane, Sam McKnight, Sian Westerman, Graham Southern, Nicky Sargent, Edward Barber, Lucy Yeomans, and Olya Kuryshchuk.

The Foundation officially launched at the Design Museum, London in June 2026.
