= Stephanie Phair =

Businesswoman (born 1978)

Stephanie Phair OBE is the former Group President at Farfetch. She was previously an independent non-executive director on the board of Moncler S.p.A. and is an advisor to Felix Capital. In May 2018, Phair was appointed chair of the British Fashion Council for a three-year tenure, taking over from Dame Natalie Massenet.

== Early life and education ==
Phair was born on 16 August 1978 in Mexico City. She has British and Canadian citizenship. She studied Politics, Philosophy and Economics at Oxford University in the United Kingdom.

== Career ==
After finishing her studies, Phair moved to New York in 1999 to work as an account executive at Siren PR in New York. She then joined the American Vogue team where she was worked closely with Anna Wintour to the launch of the CFDA Vogue Fashion Fund and the Costume Institute Gala. She also worked for Portero, an online luxury marketplace for pre-owned accessories and Issey Miyake.

Phair then launched TheOutnet.com and was part of the executive team at the Net-a-Porter Group from 2009 to 2015. As president of The Outnet, Phair grew the business from 2 employees to 150, positioning it as a high-end designer site and introducing collaborations with the likes of Oscar de la Renta and the site’s own private label Iris & Ink.

She joined Farfetch as Chief Strategy Officer in November 2016 for a newly created role she describes as “a mix of operational expertise, having run a business, understanding what the requirements are and the people needs and the talent needs. But also having had the opportunity over the last year, and even at my time at Net-a-Porter, to really witness some of the changes in the industry and seeing some of the upcoming start-ups that are creating new disruptive ideas." She sits on Farfetch's executive board and reports to founder and chief executive José Neves. In 2019 she became Chief Customer Officer.

As Chief Customer Officer, she was responsible for leading Farfetch’s consumer-oriented functions including marketing, brand, consumer products, private clients, and Store of the Future, as well as strategy.

== Personal life ==
Phair lives in London with her financier husband and three children.

== Honours and awards ==
In 2018, she has been awarded a place in the BOF 500 list which is the professional index of the people shaping the $2.4 trillion fashion industry, hand-selected by the editors of The Business of Fashion, based on hundreds of nominations received from current BoF 500 members, extensive data analysis and research.

Phair was appointed Officer of the Order of the British Empire (OBE) in the 2022 Birthday Honours for services to fashion and technology.
