= Natalie Massenet =

American businesswoman (born 1965)

Dame Natalie Massenet DBE
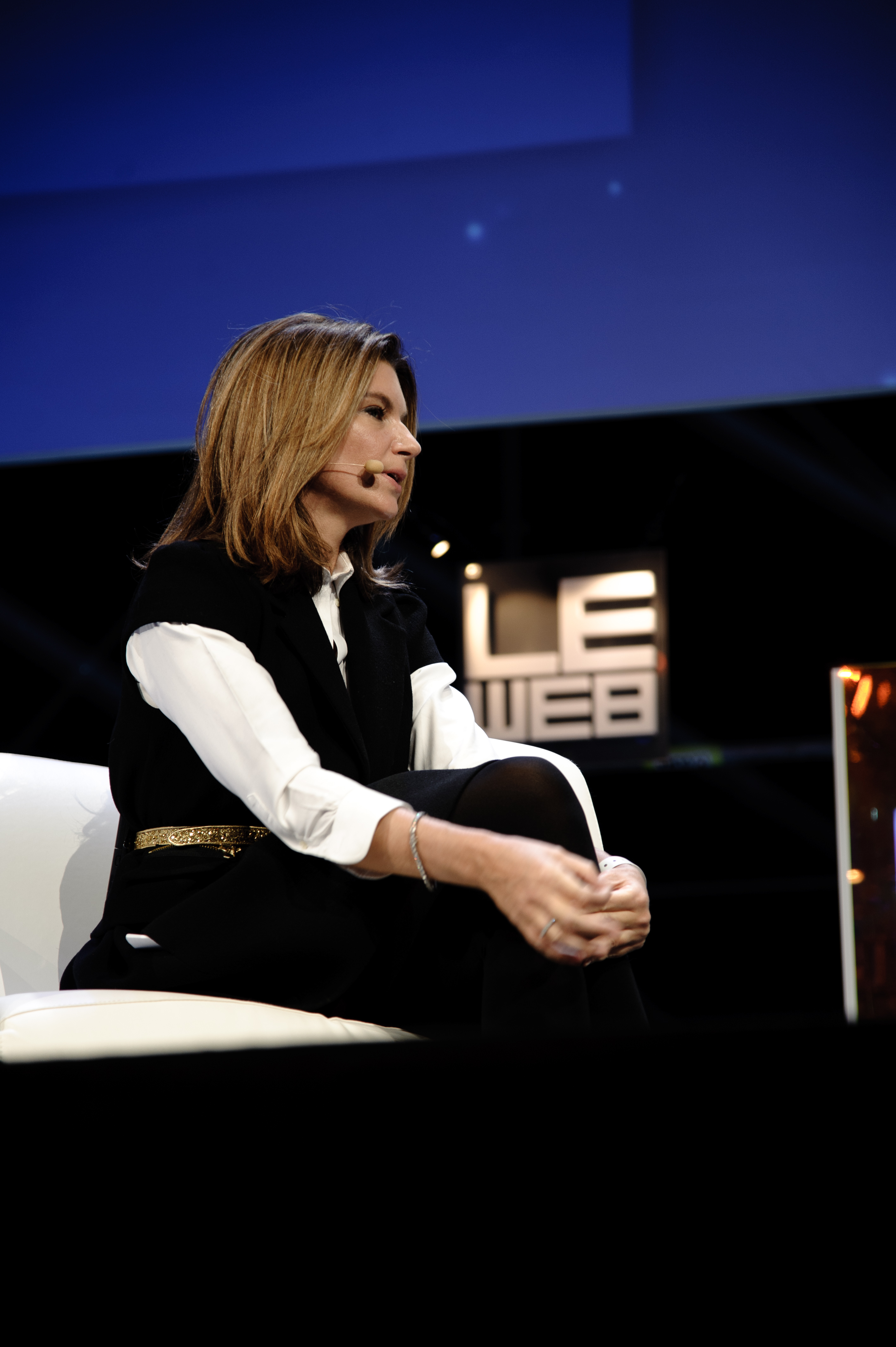
- Massenet at LeWeb at Les Docks Paris conference
- Born: Natalie Sara Rooney; 13 May 1965 (age 61); Los Angeles, California, US
- Education: UCLA
- Occupations: Founder and chairman, Net-a-Porter; Chair, British Fashion Council
- Spouse: Arnaud Massenet (divorced)
- Partner: Erik Torstensson
- Children: 3
- Awards: DBE

Dame Natalie Sara Massenet, DBE (née Rooney; born 13 May 1965) is an American and British fashion entrepreneur and former journalist, who founded the designer fashion portal Net-a-Porter. From 2013 to 2017, she was the chairman of the British Fashion Council. In 2018 alongside Nick Brown, she co-founded Imaginary Ventures and became non executive co-chairman at Farfetch.

Credited by many as changing the way designer fashion is retailed, she has been described by The Observer as: "fashion's favourite self-made success story".

== Background and early career ==
Massenet was born Natalie Sara Rooney in Los Angeles, California on 13 May 1965, the daughter of American journalist-turned-film publicist Robert “Bob” L. Rooney and Barbara Jones, a British model for Chanel and film stand-in for Sophia Loren. She spent her early childhood in Paris, moving back to Los Angeles in 1976 with her father after her parents divorced.

Her first job after graduating from high school was in a menswear shop in Los Angeles and Massenet then attended UCLA, studying English Literature. After graduating, she spent a year in Tokyo working as a fashion model and stylist. Other early jobs included working as a receptionist at Universal Studios and assisting at Italian magazine Moda, where she worked with the then-emerging photographer Mario Testino. She began her career as a fashion journalist at Women's Wear Daily (WWD) in 1993. She then moved on to Tatler in the UK, where she worked as assistant to Isabella Blow and her colleagues included Lucy Yeomans. She left to freelance in 1998.

== Net-a-Porter ==
Massenet founded Net-a-Porter in 2000 in London as a website in magazine format for selling designer fashion. The idea came about after Massenet was attempting to source products online for a fashion shoot. The business was launched from Massenet's flat in Chelsea and she raised the £1.2m start-up costs with the help of her then-husband, French hedge fund manager Arnaud Massenet. Initially the business operation was so low-key that Net-a-Porter's trademark black delivery boxes were stacked up in the bath.

The concept behind the site was to be able to click on an image of an outfit within a magazine format and buy it. In an interview for The Wall Street Journal, Massenet said that she'd walked away from her dream career in journalism to take the idea forward and it took her several years to realise that she had created a magazine format for the 21st century. Initially, the idea of selling high fashion online was unappealing to designers and investors, who could not imagine selling goods without a physical retail outlet; however, in 2001 Massenet persuaded Roland Mouret to sell his first collection via the site. By 2004, the company was profitable and won the best fashion shop award at the British Fashion Awards.

The company launched a fashion discount site, The Outnet, in 2009 and in 2010 Massenet sold Net-a-Porter to Swiss luxury goods holding company Richemont for a figure estimated at £50m, remaining involved with the company as executive chairman and an investor. In 2011, a menswear site, Mr Porter, was established; beauty was added to the site in early 2013 under the leadership of David Olsen.

As of September 2013, Net-a-Porter employed 2,600 people in the UK, US and Hong Kong, with further offices in Shanghai and fulfilment centres on the outskirts of three cities. Net-a-Porter Group is now estimated as a £350m company.

In early 2014, it launched a print magazine called Porter, with an associated app and digital version of the magazine.

Ahead of a merger with the YOOX Group, Massenet stepped down as the executive chairman of Net-a-Porter in September 2015.

== After Net-a-Porter ==
Massenet took over as chairman of the British Fashion Council in 2013. In this honorary role, which normally carries a three-year commitment, she is responsible for steering London Fashion Week and overseeing the Council's other activities to promote British fashion design in the UK and overseas. An article in 2013, suggested she has boosted London's reputation as an international fashion centre. She stepped down from her role in May 2018, replaced by Stephanie Phair, Chief Strategy Officer at Farfetch.

Massenet is still very much involved in online luxury, as she joined the online luxury platform Farfetch in February 2017 as non executive co-chairman. On the day of the announcement, Jose Neves very enthusiastically said, "I have always been a huge huge fan of Natalie. She was a pioneer that started this whole thing for the rest of us. I’ve always had huge admirations. I actually found that the thought was actually mutual. She loved the Farfetch model and the brand DNA. She got more and more excited about the business."

She also co-founded Imaginary Ventures in 2018 with Nick Brown, formerly of 14W Ventures. Imaginary is a Venture Capital Fund that invests in early–stage opportunities at the intersection of retail and technology in Europe and the US. They've already invested in millennial brand Glossier created by Emily Weiss, Khloe Kardashian’s denim company Good American, tights company Heist, cosmetic dermatology brand Ever/Body, pop up retail company Appear Here.

She has been extensively renovating the listed Donhead House in Wiltshire with Erik Torstensson since she purchased it for £1.4 million in 2014. Philip Joseph was responsible for the interior renovation of the property.

== Personal life ==
Massenet has two daughters with her ex-husband, French hedge fund manager Arnaud Massenet, and a son with her former long-time partner Erik Torstensson. In 2025, Massenet filed a civil case against Torstensson for breach of contract, fraud and intentional deceit, promissory estoppel, and intentional/negligent infliction of emotional distress.

== Awards ==
- Massenet was appointed Member of the Order of the British Empire (MBE) for services to the fashion industry in 2009 and Dame Commander of the Order of the British Empire (DBE) in the 2016 New Year Honours for services to the fashion and retail industries.
- In 2013, Massenet was made a Woman of the Year by US Glamour magazine.
- In 2014, she was named as one of the 100 most influential people by Time.
- Between 2013 and 2017, she has been awarded a place in the BOF 500 list which is the professional index of the people shaping the $2.4 trillion fashion industry, hand-selected by the editors of The Business of Fashion, based on hundreds of nominations received from current BoF 500 members, extensive data analysis and research.
