= 2008 in red carpet fashion =

Red carpet fashion in 2008 was affected by the 2007–2008 Writers Guild of America strike, which led to the cancellation of the Golden Globes that year. The Oscars were dominated by uncontroversial designs in solid colours which led to criticism of "safe" choices, and drew attention to those who dressed more individually, such as Tilda Swinton and Marion Cotillard.

== Golden Globe Awards (January 13) ==
Due to the writer's strike the 65th Golden Globe Awards ceremony was not held, with a press conference instead announcing that year's winners. Almost all the celebrities who intended to attend promised to boycott the awards rather than cross threatened picket lines. The cancellation of the Golden Globes was seen as disastrous for the fashion industry, as not only were established designers affected, but the opportunity for up-and-coming designers to achieve widespread recognition through red-carpet exposure of their designs had been severely limited, particularly with the Oscars also under threat.

== Academy Awards (February 24) ==
The writer's strike, which threatened the 80th Oscars ceremony, was lifted on February 12, enabling the event to go ahead.

One-shouldered or strapless gowns and solid-coloured, predominantly red dresses were widely worn for the event, going against the trend for vibrant prints. Although the "uniform timelessness" of the 2008 Oscar gowns was noted and appreciated, they were also criticised for being "safe" choices. Hilary Alexander of The Daily Telegraph reported losing count of all the "fitted, strapless, fishtail hem gowns", and Hal Rubenstein, fashion director at InStyle, also noticed a prevalence of timelessly classic solid-coloured strapless dresses. Simon Doonan described the guests as looking like a "bunch of Republican drears on their way to a constipated night out at the local country club" in their "fussy bustier gowns", applauding Tilda Swinton's individualism in her unusual one-sleeved black toga gown by Alber Elbaz for Lanvin. He said that the "lowbrow media", by criticising anything quirky or unusual dress-wise, had led to many celebrities dressing much more cautiously in order not to attract the "fashion fascism" of negative publicity. Rubenstein also shared Doonan's admiration for Swinton's dress, saying "This unique dress may have received criticism, but taking a risk at the Oscars is a winning move that we applaud," and included it in 90th place in InStyle's list of the 100 Best Dresses of the Decade. Hilary Alexander was less convinced, calling Swinton's gown a "shroud", while others compared it to "trash bags". Swinton later said that she asked for a comfortable dress that would attract minimal attention, and commented “Little did I know that the really simple, chic dress one might have worn in Paris or Berlin would stick out like a sore thumb in Los Angeles.” Also standing out from the norm, but more universally approved, was Marion Cotillard's white and silver Jean Paul Gaultier mermaid gown with a fishscale pattern which both Alexander and Rubenstein admired. Cotillard was also praised by The Times-Picayune for bucking the trend for red and wearing the "most inventive look of the evening", whilst Pieta Woolley at The Georgia Straight said "the only truly Hollywood-worthy gown of the evening". Rubenstein, listing Cotillard's dress as one of the decade's 100 best, declared it "a great introduction for Cotillard. No one is going to repeat this dress."

Cosmopolitan magazine, listing the best dresses worn on the red carpet, singled out Katherine Heigl's relaxed, "sex bomb" appearance in her vermilion one-shouldered gown by Escada. The dress was described as transforming Heigl from "daffy" into a "cinema diva" and was remembered by Heigl's stylist Nicole Chavez as a "game-changer". The Rocky Mountain News said of Heigl, "Now, this is what a movie star should look like," and the reviewers at The Register-Mail all agreed that Heigl looked outstanding. Also in shades of red were Anne Hathaway, Miley Cyrus, Helen Mirren, Ruby Dee, and Heidi Klum, whose extravagant Galliano gown was auctioned off for the charity The Heart Truth. Alongside Heigl and Hathaway, one-shouldered designs were worn by Hilary Swank and Olivia Thirlby.

== Emmys (21 September) ==
Fashions on the 60th Primetime Emmy Awards continued the trend for bold colours and one-shoulder designs seen at the Oscars, with trends for metallic, lace and feature necklines (either plunging, sweetheart, or jewel-embellished) also observed by InStyle. Whilst reported on at the time, few of the looks received in-depth coverage, and InStyle did not choose any dresses from the event for their Top 100 dresses of the decade.

=== Gallery ===
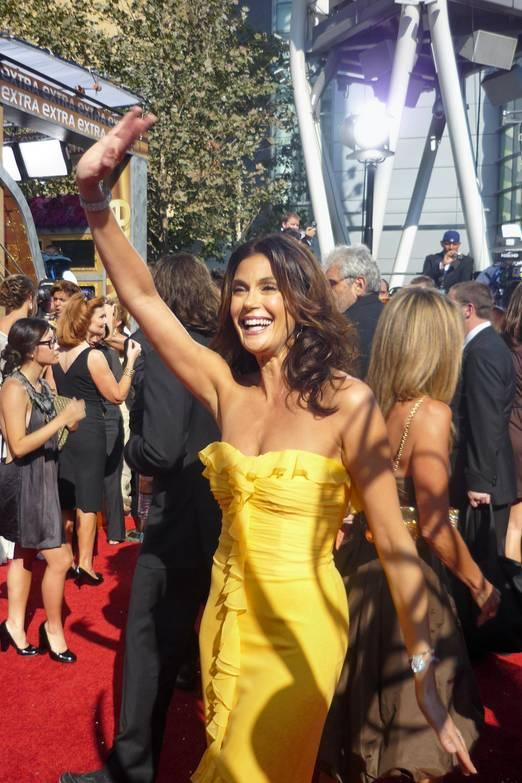
Teri Hatcher in a bold yellow Monique Lhuillier strapless dress

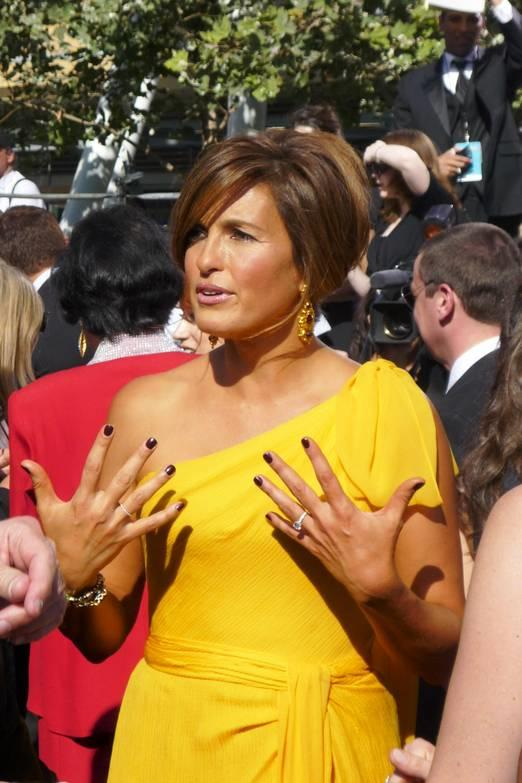
Mariska Hargitay in a one-shouldered dress

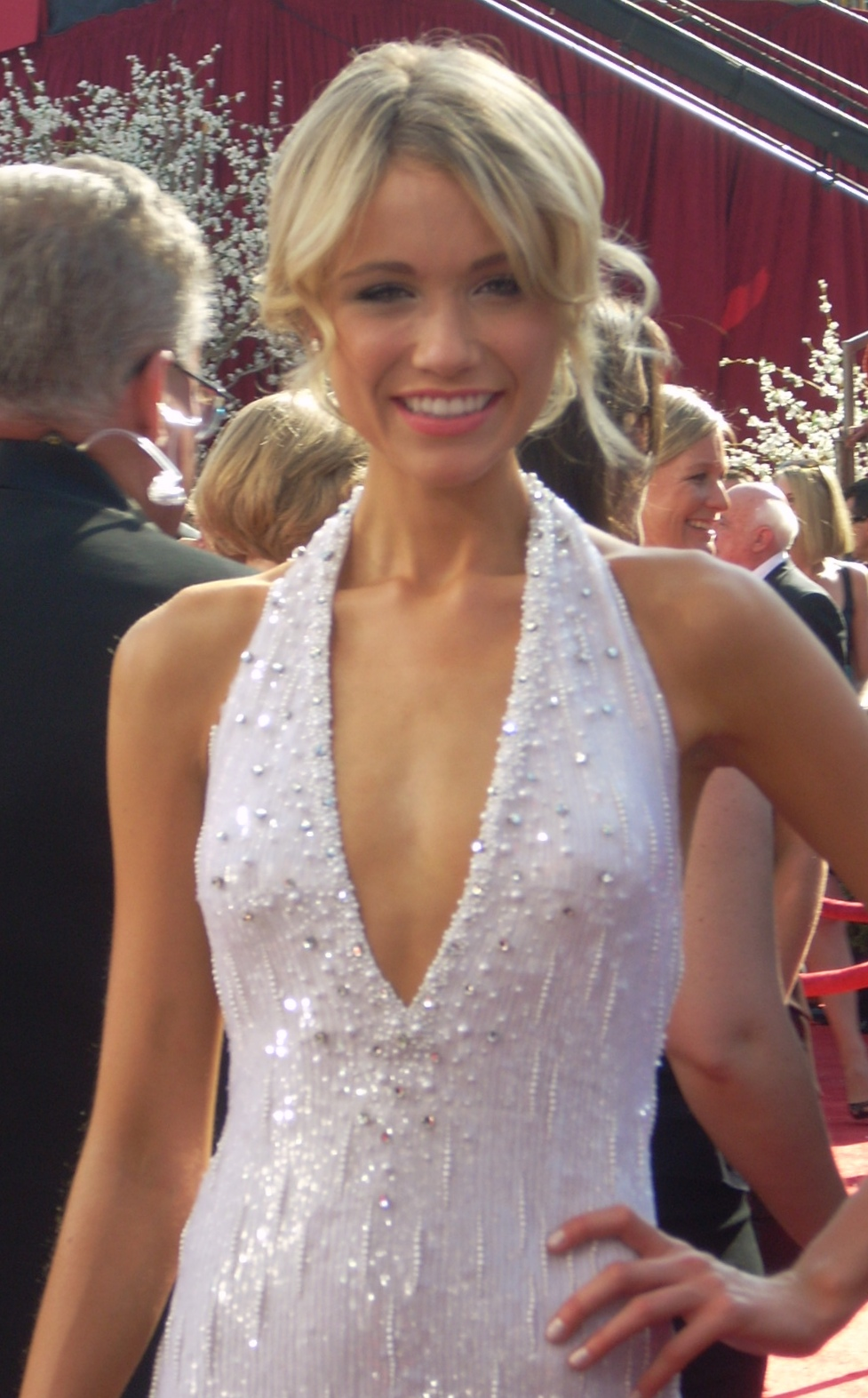
Katrina Bowden in a beaded dress with a plunging neckline

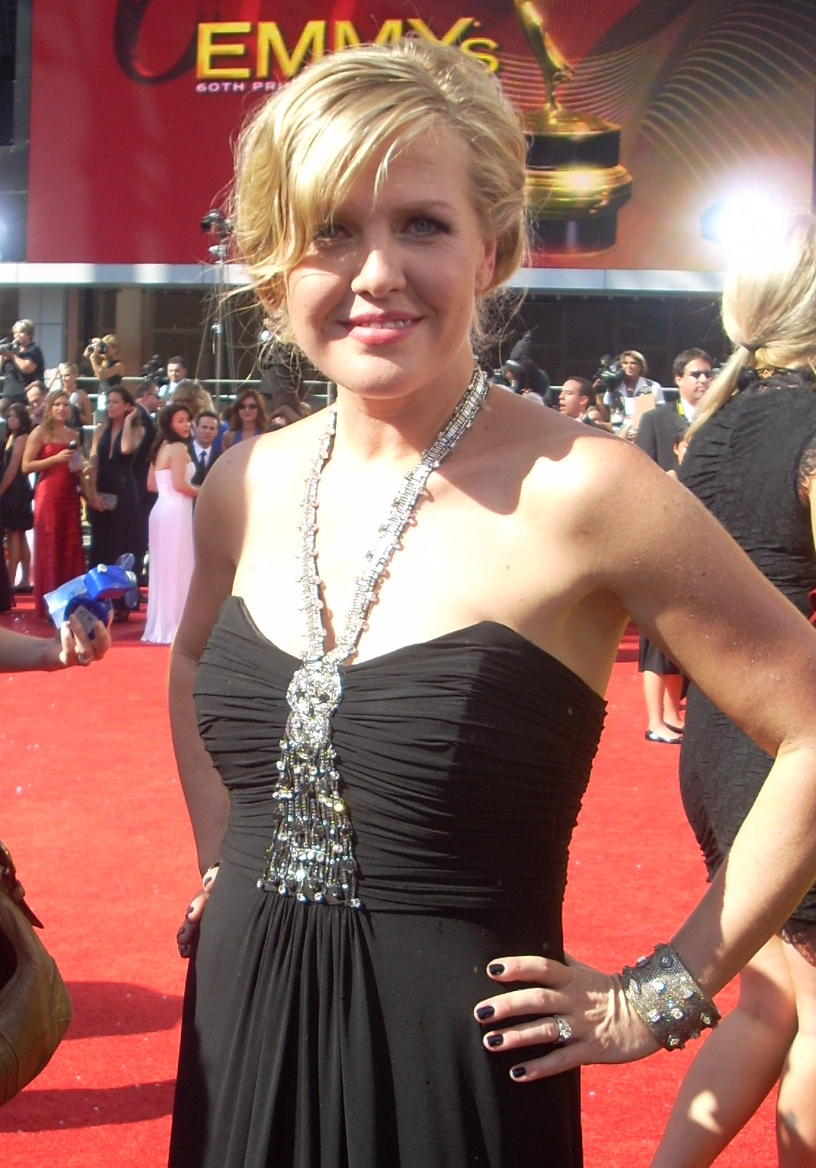
Ashley Jensen in a black gown with a feature jewelled neckline

== Other events ==
In Paris, in November 2008, Gwyneth Paltrow attended the film première of Two Lovers in a short, black-and-white trompe-l'œil corset dress by Antonio Berardi. Paltrow's choice, which revealed her underwear through sheer black lace panels, led to her being named 4th worst-dressed celebrity of the year by Time. However, it received international attention with one French publication praising its combination of modernity, boldness and minimalism. Spanish language publications commented on how Paltrow successfully combined her "Laura Ingalls" sweetness with elements of "punk" edginess, in her on-trend corset-and-lingerie-inspired dress, with ¡Hola! using it as an illustration of the new fashion. The dress, which Paltrow described as "one of the absolute favourite dresses I have worn," was subsequently selected by Lucy Yeomans of Harper's Bazaar UK to be the 2009 Dress of the Year in the permanent collection of the Fashion Museum, Bath.
