= Steph Adams =

Australian author and art director

- Occupations: Entrepreneur, author, model
- Spouse: Joel Teasdel (Head of Dimensional Fund Advisors) 2009 - 2022
- Children: Two
- Website: www.stephadams.com

Steph Adams is an Australian author, art director, and former model. She has worked in fashion publishing and has authored fifty two books focused on women in business, wellness, and motherhood.

== Career ==
Adams began working as a model at age 12. In 1999 she modelled for Vogue in Greece, wearing Louis Vuitton. She later transitioned into art direction and graphic design within the magazine publishing industry. She reportedly held art direction and design roles for the Australian and British editions of magazines including Vogue, Harper's Bazaar, Marie Claire, GQ, and Elle. In 2009, she relocated to London to work as an art editor for the fashion e-commerce company Net-a-Porter, where she reportedly contributed to the design of the brand's first print magazine.

=== Publishing ===
Adams has authored thirty books and anthologies.

In 2016 she co-authored Good to Glow, a recipe and wellness book featuring contributions from public figures and wellness practitioners. That same year, Adams and Australian journalist Samantha Brett co-authored The Game Changers, a collection of interviews and essays regarding career trajectories and business. Contributors included Arianna Huffington, Elle Macpherson, and Meghan Markle.

Adams and Brett collaborated again in 2019 to publish The Juggle through Penguin Books. The book is reportedly a collection of essays discussing work-life balance and motherhood.
