= Louis-Nicolas Darbon =

Louis-Nicolas Darbon was born 1983 in Paris and is a French London-based contemporary artist influenced by pop art, neo-expressionism and street art. He is well known for his various iconic pop figure portraits and fashion inspired artworks. He is also popular on social media for his dress sense.

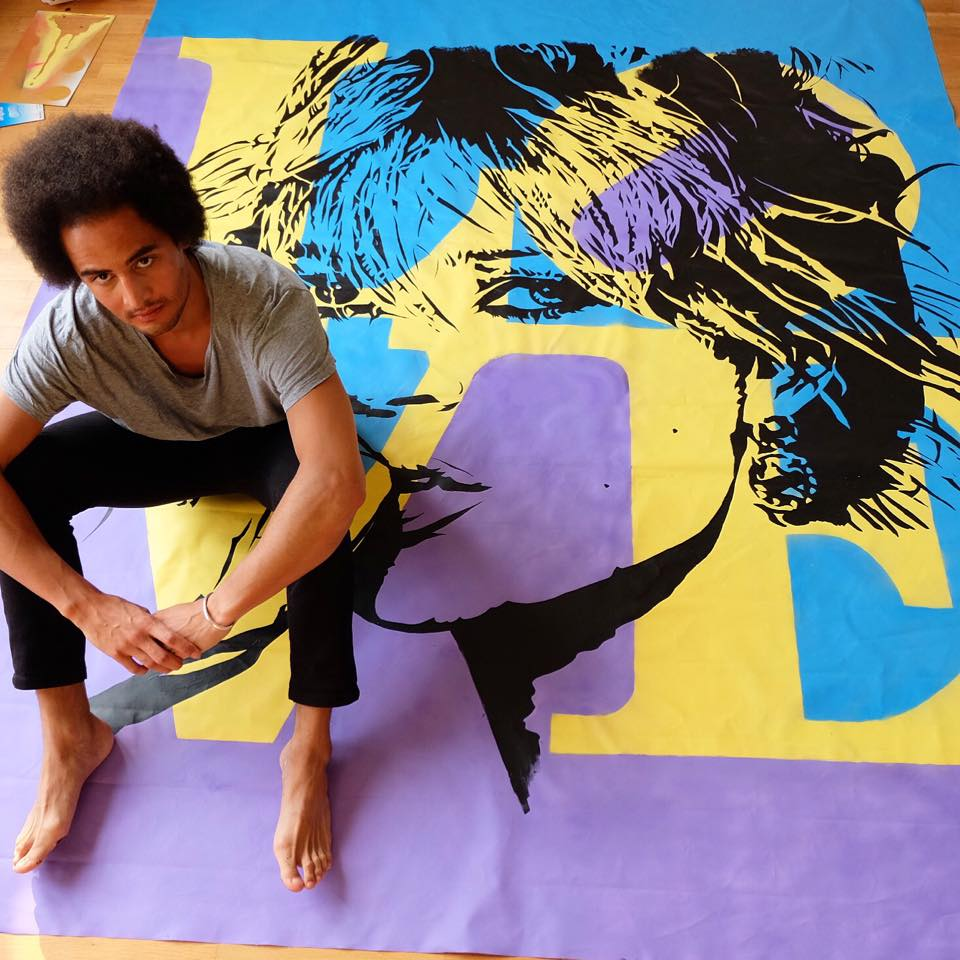
Louis-Nicolas Darbon Notting Hill Studio

== Life and career ==
Louis-Nicolas Darbon was born and grew up in Versailles and Paris in France. He studied at a private university and lived in New York, Beijing, Shanghai, Hong Kong and Tokyo during his studies. After graduating he returned to Europe and worked for fashion houses including Marc Jacobs, Louis Vuitton, Net-a-Porter, Christian Louboutin and Burberry.

Since 2013 Louis-Nicolas has been represented by galleries worldwide. He has exhibited both nationally and internationally. He took part in Art Basel Hong Kong 2016 and has had solo shows and group shows in London, New York, Hong Kong, Japan, Marrakesh, France and Switzerland.

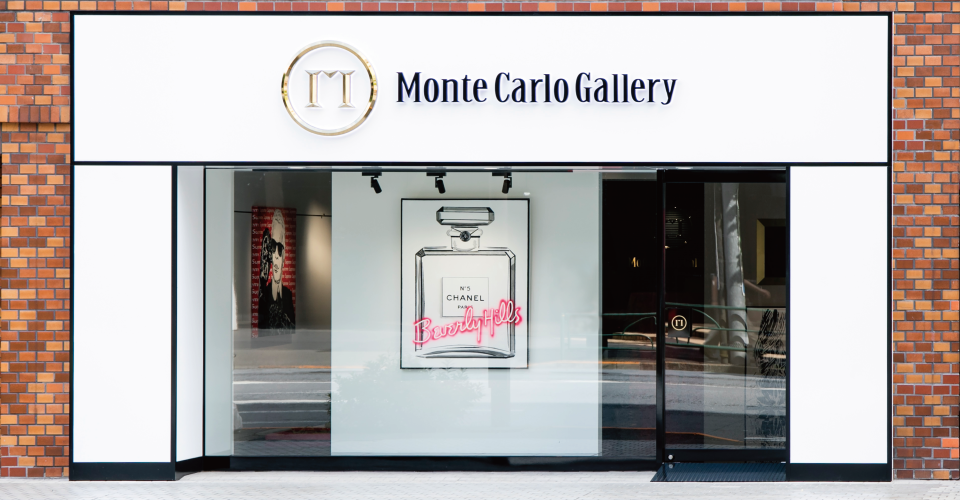
Pop Roppongi by Louis-Nicolas Darbon at Monte Carlo Gallery, Tokyo

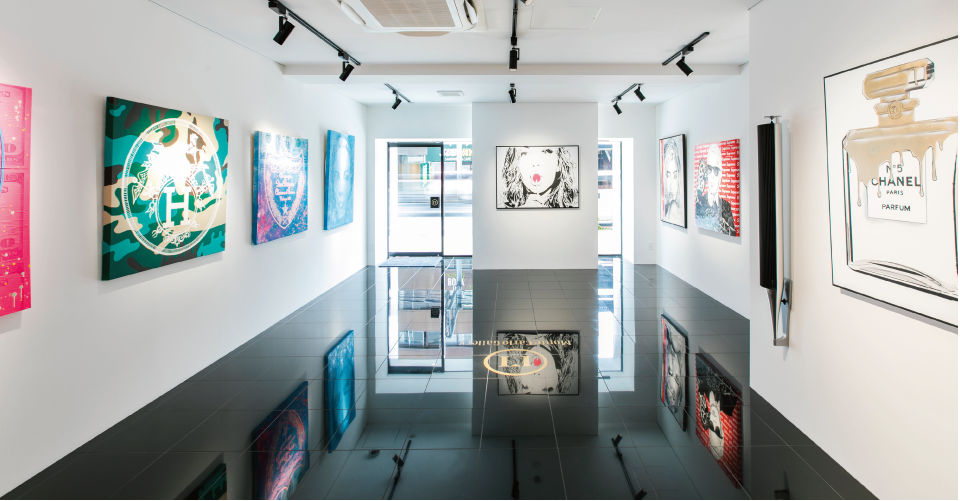
Pop Roppongi by Louis-Nicolas Darbon at Monte Carlo Gallery, Tokyo

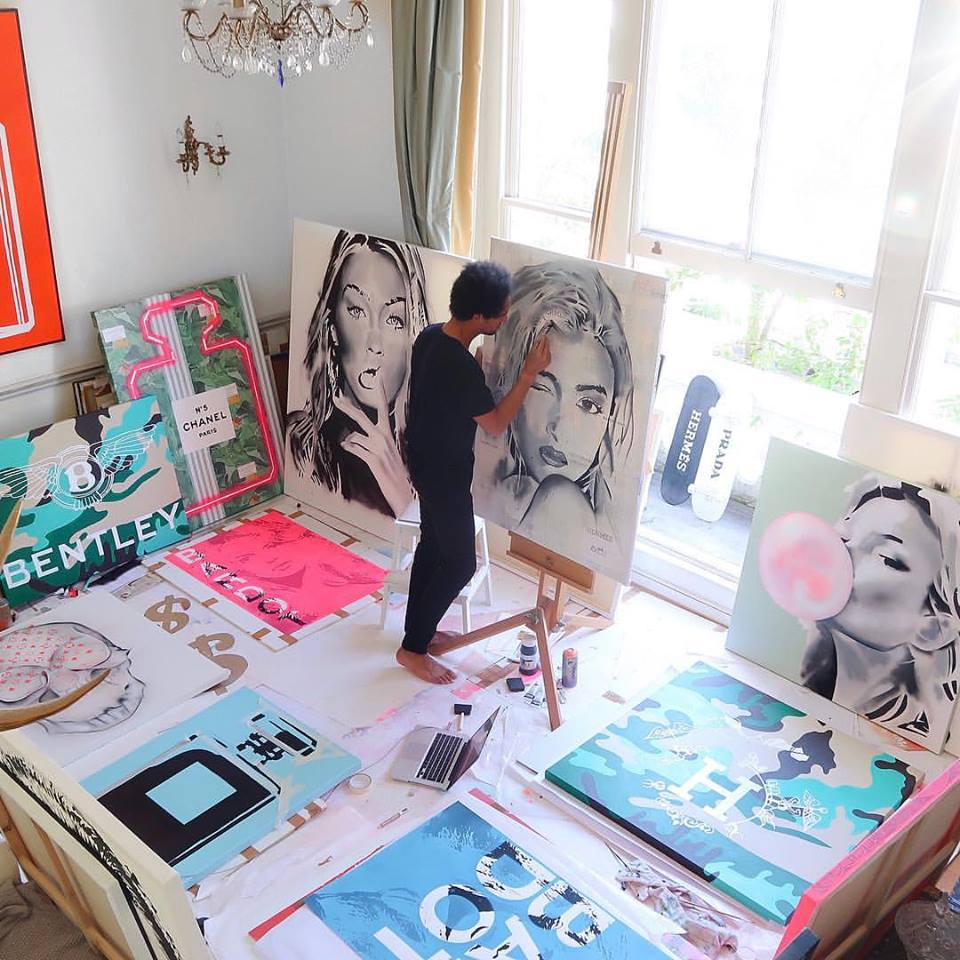
Louis-Nicolas Darbon Studio

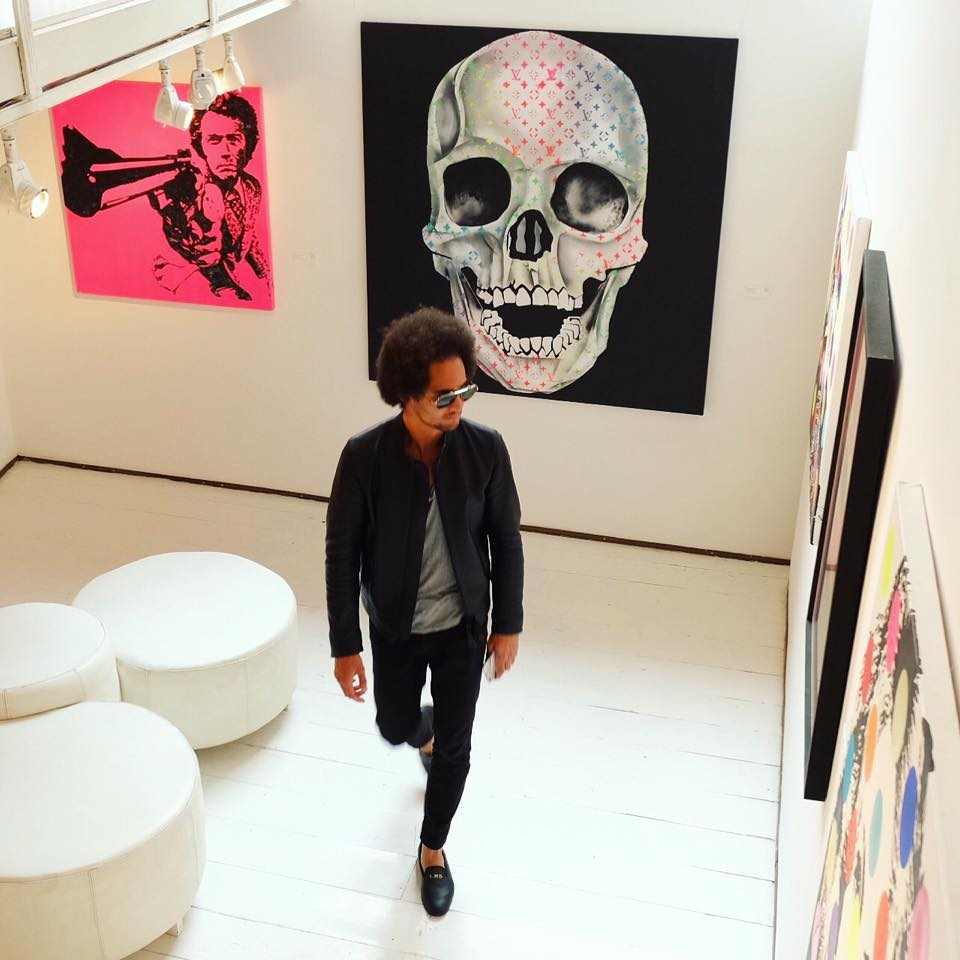
Louis-Nicolas Darbon BCK Gallery Marrakech
