= Tania Fares =

Lebanese fashion writer and philanthropist

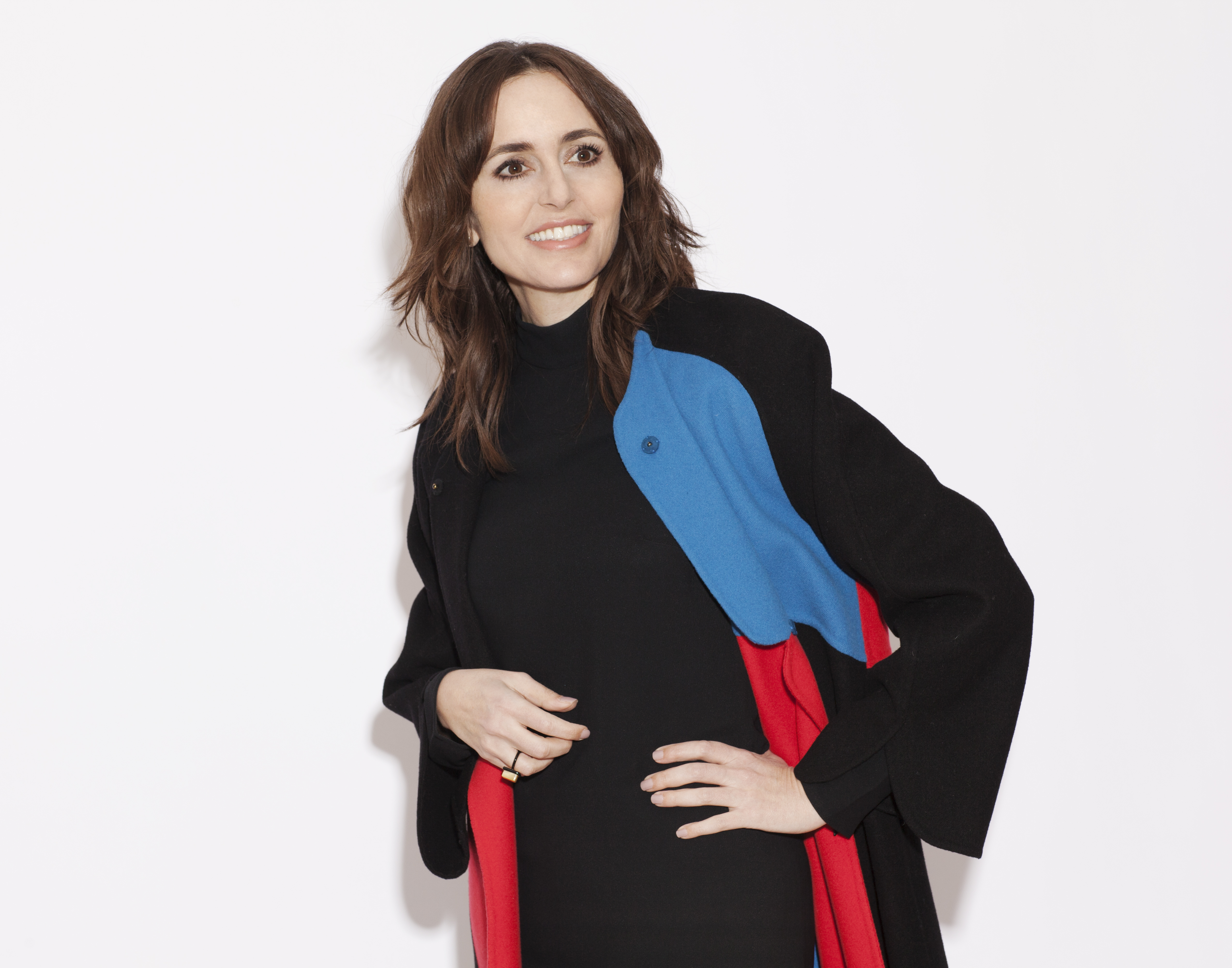
Tania Fares in 2015

Tania Fares is a Lebanese fashion writer based in London with homes in Lebanon and Los Angeles, United States. In 2011, she founded and co-chaired, with Sian Westerman, the BFC Fashion Trust, a charity supported by the British Fashion Council. In 2018, she co-founded Fashion Trust Arabia with her co-chair, Sheikha Al-Mayassa bint Hamad bin Khalifa Al-Thani, which supports fashion designers in the MENA region. In 2021, she became a co-chair of the BFC Foundation alongside Narmina Marandi. In 2022, Fares co-founded Fashion Trust U.S. alongside Laura Brown, Anne Crawford, Tan France, Samira Nasr and Karla Welch.

== Early life ==
Fares was born in Lebanon but grew up in Paris, where an uncle introduced her to the city's art and museums. She held an internship with Pierre Cardin.

== Writing ==
Fares is a frequent contributor to British Vogue.

She and Sarah Mower co-authored London Uprising: Fifty Fashion Designers, One City (Phaidon, 2017: ISBN 978-0714873350).

She and Krista Smith co-authored Fashion in LA (Phaidon 2019: ISBN 978-0714879246).

== Personal life ==
Fares resides in Los Angeles, Beirut, Paris, and London. In Lebanon, she lives in a home in the mountains above Beirut, designed by Nabil Gholam.
