= Phair =

Phair is an English language surname. It is a variant spelling of fair. People with this surname include:

- Casey Phair (born 2007), American–South Korean women's soccer player
- Caspar Phair
- John Phair, Anglican bishop
- Liz Phair, American singer and actress
- Lyle Phair, ice hockey player
- Michael Phair, politician
- Mike Phair, American football coach
- Stephanie Phair, businessperson
- Venetia Phair
