= Federico Marchetti (businessman) =

Italian businessman (born 1969)

- Born: 21 February 1969 (age 57); Ravenna, Italy
- Education: Bocconi University (BA); Columbia Business School (MBA)
- Occupations: Founder of YOOX; Chairman of YOOX NET A PORTER Group
- Known for: Founding Internet retailing company YOOX Group
- Website: federicomarchetti.com

Federico Marchetti (born 21 February 1969) is an Italian businessman who founded and, until July 2021, was chairman and CEO of YOOX NET-A-PORTER Group.

== Education and early career ==
Federico Marchetti was born in 1969 and raised in Ravenna, Italy. His father worked in an automobile factory and his mother was a telephone operator. Marchetti graduated from Bocconi University in 1993 with a degree in Economics. His first job was at the Lehman Brothers branch office in Milan, where he worked in investment banking for three years. In 1998 he moved to New York City to pursue graduate studies, and received an MBA from Columbia University following a brief career in finance and consulting, he created the Internet retailing company in 2000 in Zola Predosa. in 1999.

While at Columbia, Marchetti decided to leave the banking industry and become an entrepreneur, However, after receiving his degree, he took a job with Bain & Company in Milan after attempting to find a position in the American entertainment industry.

== Yoox ==
Marchetti came upon the idea of combining the "exclusive" nature of luxury fashion with the full "accessibility" of the Internet. In 1999 he developed a business plan for Yoox, whose name comes from the Y and X chromosomes, combined with the 00 from the binary of computer code. He then quit his consulting job, and after cold-calling venture capitalist Elserino Piol, who gave Marchetti 4.5 million euros in funding in March 2000 in exchange for 35% of the company, he created the Internet retailing company YOOX.

In 2010, YOOX Group opened its first offices in China in the city of Shanghai, opening its first mono-brand site there, www.emporioarmani.cn. In 2012, YOOX Group partnered with Kering Group and the two established a joint venture that manages the mono-brand online stores of Kering's luxury brands: Bottega Veneta, Saint Laurent, Alexander McQueen, Balenciaga, Sergio Rossi, Stella McCartney and Brioni.

Since 2014 Yoox has been selling works by artists such as Damien Hirst, Marc Quinn and Peter Blake and designs from companies like Cappellini, Alessi, and Kartell, which it took on as one of its mono-brand clients.

In 2015 his company merged with Net-A-Porter, changing the name of the firm to YOOX Net-A-Porter Group, becoming the largest e-commerce fashion company in the world, and in 2018 the company was acquired by Richemont. In 2016, YOOX Net-A-Porter Group and Symphony, an entity controlled by Mohamed Alabbar's family, established a joint venture to create a platform for online luxury retail for the Middle East.

== Other activities ==
Marchetti is a Trustee of The King's Foundation, and the Circular Bioeconomy Alliance. He chairs the Sustainable Markets Initiative's Fashion Task Force, and sits on the Board of Armani.

== Art collection ==
Marchetti is an art collector, with paintings from artists including Ettore Sottsass, Franz West, Yoshitomo Nara, Mark Kostabi, Andy Warhol, Lucian Freud, and Francesco Vezzoli. He began his collection in the early 1990s soon after he graduated. He is interested in works revolving around Dracula and the literature of Bram Stoker, and has travelled to research the subject.

== Recognition ==
In 2011, Marchetti was given an award for Innovation and Internet by the Italy-based Chi è Chi (Who's Who) organization. On 25 January 2012, Marchetti and YOOX Group were awarded the Comitato Leonardo's Premio Leonardo award for innovation by Giorgio Napolitano, President of Italy. In 2016 Marchetti was recognized as Italy's Entrepreneur of the Year by Ernst & Young, for founding and successfully leading the Yoox Net-a-Porter Group. He received the America Award of the Italy–USA Foundation in 2018.

== Personal life ==
Marchetti is married to British journalist Kerry Olsen. The couple has a daughter. The family splits its time between an apartment in Milan; a penthouse in Hampstead, London (designed by Bella Freud); and a 9,600-square-foot former silk-weaving factory at Lake Como which was refurbished by film director Luca Guadagnino

His autobiography The Geek of Chic: An American Dream Italian style was published in 2025.
