= Alison Loehnis =

American business executive

Alison Loehnis is an American business executive based in London. She was the interim CEO of YOOX Net-a-Porter Group, and the president of Net-a-Porter.

== Education ==
Loehnis graduated from Brown University with a degree in art history.

== Career ==
Loehnis had a job in advertising at Saatchi & Saatchi. She was a creative executive at The Walt Disney Company and had a marketing job at Thomas Pink.

In 2007, Loehnis joined Net-a-Porter. She led the launch of its brands the Outnet in 2009 and Mr. Porter in 2011. In 2015, she led the merge of YOOX and Net-a-Porter, which created YOOX Net-a-Porter Group. In June 2025, Loehnis stepped down from her positions as president and interim CEO after 18 years at the company, following YNAP's acquisition by Mytheresa's newly formed luxury e-commerce group LuxExperience.

Since 2022, she has also been a non-executive director on the board of Lululemon Athletica.

In October 2025, Loehnis joined JPMorgan Chase as a senior adviser in its global consumer and retail investment banking team, focusing on luxury and lifestyle brands.
