= Ivory Jean Paul Gaultier dress of Marion Cotillard =

Dress worn by Marion Cotillard at the 80th Academy Awards

- Designer: Jean Paul Gaultier
- Year: 2008
- Type: Ivory dress
- Material: Crepe

French actress Marion Cotillard wore a custom Jean Paul Gaultier ivory crepe (or white-and-silver) mermaid dress to the 80th Academy Awards on 24 February 2008, at which she won the Academy Award for Best Actress for her performance as French singer Édith Piaf in La Vie en Rose (2007). Several publications such as Vogue, Variety, Forbes, ABC News, CNN, Marie Claire, Glamour, Entertainment Tonight, The Daily Telegraph, and The Hollywood Reporter have cited the dress as one of the greatest Oscar gowns of all time. The dress increased in value after the 2008 Academy Awards and was estimated to be worth $180,000 as of 2023.

== Background ==
A golden bronze version of the dress — a mermaid-style gown with gilded scales overlapping at the bust and hip, a 3D rose-shaped embellishment at the bust and a crisscross back — was presented on the catwalk as look number 38 from Jean Paul Gaultier's Spring/Summer 2008 Couture Show at the Paris Fashion Week on 23 January 2008. The dress was named "The Mermaid Queen".

After seeing the dress at the Paris Fashion Week in January 2008, French actress Marion Cotillard met with Gaultier at his atelier in Paris on 8 February 2008 for fittings, during which she tried on the golden version of the dress, but she wanted to wear something different to the Academy Awards for which she was nominated for Best Actress for La Vie en Rose (2007). The French documentary Mon Clown, broadcast by Canal+ in France on 14 March 2008, features footage of Cotillard's visit to the atelier and the seamstresses working on her dress. Before the Academy Awards, Cotillard wore a short pale-pink dress with gilded scales from the same Gaultier collection at the César Awards on 22 February 2008, at which she won the César Award for Best Actress for La Vie en Rose (2007).

On 24 February 2008, Cotillard wore a custom made ivory crepe/white and silver version of the dress to the 80th Academy Awards, at which she won the Academy Award for Best Actress for her performance as French singer Édith Piaf in La Vie en Rose (2007). Cotillard's version of the dress had gold and silver threading, was created in 180 hours and handsewn by five people. Gaultier told InStyle about the dress:

Originally, Marion had asked for something simple, but I wanted everyone to see the woman I saw. So I showed her the sketches of this mermaid-inspired dress, and she loved it. We had to wait two weeks for the fabric, whose print was inspired by real fish scales and hand-embroidered. She was traveling around the world promoting La Vie en Rose, so we had to follow her around so that she could try on the dress at regular intervals. How crazy! But what a moment full of emotion and grace on the red carpet, just like the actress and the woman she is.

Before making Cotillard's dress for the 2008 Academy Awards, Gaultier had almost collaborated with the actress when he was considered to design the costumes for a French production of the musical Hedwig and the Angry Inch, which Cotillard was set to star in 2007, but Cotillard gave up on the project because the physical demands of the role were too intense for her, and she was exhausted after shooting and promoting La Vie en Rose.

== Reception ==
Vogue magazine said the dress "was covered in hundreds of mermaid-like scales". Numerous outlets, including Vogue,Variety, ABC News, CNN, Forbes, The Hollywood Reporter, Marie Claire, Entertainment Tonight, Fashionista, Glamour, Today, USA Today, and The Daily Telegraph cited the dress as one of the greatest Oscar gowns of all time.

Cotillard was also praised by The Times-Picayune for bucking the trend for red at the 80th Academy Awards and wearing the "most inventive look of the evening", whilst Pieta Woolley at The Georgia Straight called it "the only truly Hollywood-worthy gown of the evening". Hal Rubenstein, fashion director at InStyle, listing Cotillard's dress as one of the decade's 100 best, declared it "a great introduction for Cotillard. No one is going to repeat this dress."

In a 2020 interview with Enchanted Living Magazine about mermaid fashion, American author and fashion consultant Tim Gunn was asked about his opinion on Gaultier's 2008 collection, to which he said:

Gaultier is ever the showman. I found his fall 2008 couture collection to be expectedly over-the-top and, frankly, entirely too literal and, therefore, costumey for my taste. However, the look from the collection that Marion Cotillard wore to the Academy Awards was stunning. (For me, evaluating fashion is all about context; who's wearing it and for what purpose.) And owing to the fact that Ms. Cotillard won an Oscar that year, Gaultier's dress received a lot of attention, a lot of very positive attention.

In 2023, Vogue again cited the dress as one of the greatest Oscar dresses of all time, with Vogue senior beauty editor Lauren Valenti calling it one of her favorite fashion moments ever.

== Legacy ==
The dress was worth $150,000 in 2008 and increased to $180,000 in 2023.

In 2013, the golden version of the dress was featured in the exhibition "The Fashion World of Jean-Paul Gaultier: From the Sidewalk to the Catwalk" at the Brooklyn Museum in New York, and in 2014 at the National Gallery of Victoria in Melbourne, Australia.

In 2016, Harper's Bazaar included the dress on its list of "The Best Red Carpet Look The Year You Were Born" for 2008. In 2018, Cosmopolitan featured the dress on its list of "The Most Iconic Oscar Dress the Year You Were Born" for 2008. In 2021, Business Insider also included it on its list of "The Most Memorable Red Carpet Look From the Year You Were Born" for 2008.

In 2023, Kendall Jenner wore the golden version of the dress to the 2023 Vanity Fair Oscar party following the 95th Academy Awards.

In 2024, British marketplace OnBuy asked over 3,000 people to pick their favorite celebrity Oscar dress of all time, and Cotillard's mermaid dress was ranked at number 10.

When Cotillard was a guest judge on Drag Race France All Stars in July 2025, one of the contestants, Mami Watta, designed a mermaid dress that resembled Cotillard's 2008 Oscar dress.

== See also ==
- 2008 in red carpet fashion
- List of individual dresses
