= Stadium Goods =

American resell company

- Type: Subsidiary
- Industry: Retail
- Founded: 2015
- Headquarters: New York City, United States
- Key people: Laura Sartor (CEO); John McPheters (Former CEO); Jed Stiller (Former CEO)
- Parent: Farfetch
- Website: www.stadiumgoods.com

Stadium Goods is a retailer specialised in the resale of aftermarket sneakers. Based in New York City, it operates a shop and a drop-off center in SoHo, Manhattan as well as an online store. The store sells sneakers and streetwear, including rare and limited edition sneakers.

== History ==
Stadium Goods was founded in 2015 by John McPheters and Jed Stiller, who shared the role of CEO. In August 2016, Stadium Goods entered the Chinese market through partnership with Alibaba's Tmall, a platform for businesses to sell brand name goods to consumers based in China. In November 2017, during the Single's Day promotion on Alibaba, Stadium Goods reached $3m in sales during a 24-hour period.

In 2018 the company received backing from LVMH Luxury Ventures, and in January 2019 it was acquired by the London-based online retail company Farfetch for $250m.

In 2018, McPheters and Stiller were selected for the Business of Fashion 500 list, the WWD 40 of Tomorrow, and the Footwear News Power 150.

In December 2019, plans were announced for a second store in the U.S., located in Chicago. The store and its associated Intake Center opened with great celebration in October 2020 and closed fairly quietly in 2023.

In July 2022, Laura Sartor took over as Chief Executive Officer, while Jed Stiller and John McPheters moved into advisory roles.

== Concept ==
The company runs a sneaker and streetwear resale marketplace specialising in unworn rare and collectable items as well as game-worn sneakers. It operates a consignment model which means that, unlike peer-to-peer marketplaces, the company authenticates products from resellers before taking orders from customers. The model differs from those of many circular fashion retailers in that this step takes place before purchase rather than once a buyer has been found. Sellers don’t list items themselves, but send them to Stadium Goods or drop them off at the company’s NYC Intake Center for inspection and verification. The brand maintains warehouses where they store their inventory and ship directly as soon as an item has sold.

Stadium Goods were selling branded merchandise like logo t-shirts, hoodies, and socks from the beginning, and in May 2021 they added a second in-house apparel line, STADIUM. Initially a premium capsule collection of 11 high-end basics like a varsity jacket and a rugby sweater, STADIUM is designed by Greig Bennett, founder of Orchard Street clothing and planned to be kept fresh via regular drops and collaborations.

== In popular culture ==
Stadium Goods’ New York store has been the location for numerous episodes of Complex’s web series Sneaker Shopping, including episodes featuring Will Smith and Martin Lawrence, Billie Eilish, Roger Federer, Cody Rhodes, and Alicia Keys. In 2016, the New York store hosted DJ Khaled and thousands of his friends for his “We the Best” pop-up shop. In 2019 Stadium Goods hosted thousands of fans for a pop-up shop from the gamer group FaZe Clan.

== Controversy and allegations ==
=== Allegations of systemic failures ===
In January 2026, an investigative report alleged systemic failures at Stadium Goods related to its authentication, customer service, and business practices, particularly during its bankruptcy proceedings. The report compiled customer and consignor accounts alleging the sale of inauthentic sneakers despite a guarantee of authenticity, unresponsive customer service regarding disputes and refunds, and a breach of a consignor's account. The report further cited an anonymous source who claimed the company, under financial pressure, intentionally sold lower-quality goods as authentic. The allegations were presented to a contact at the Federal Trade Commission, which suggested such practices could violate prohibitions on deceptive trade. Stadium Goods had not publicly responded to the specific allegations at the time of the report's publication.
