= British fashion =

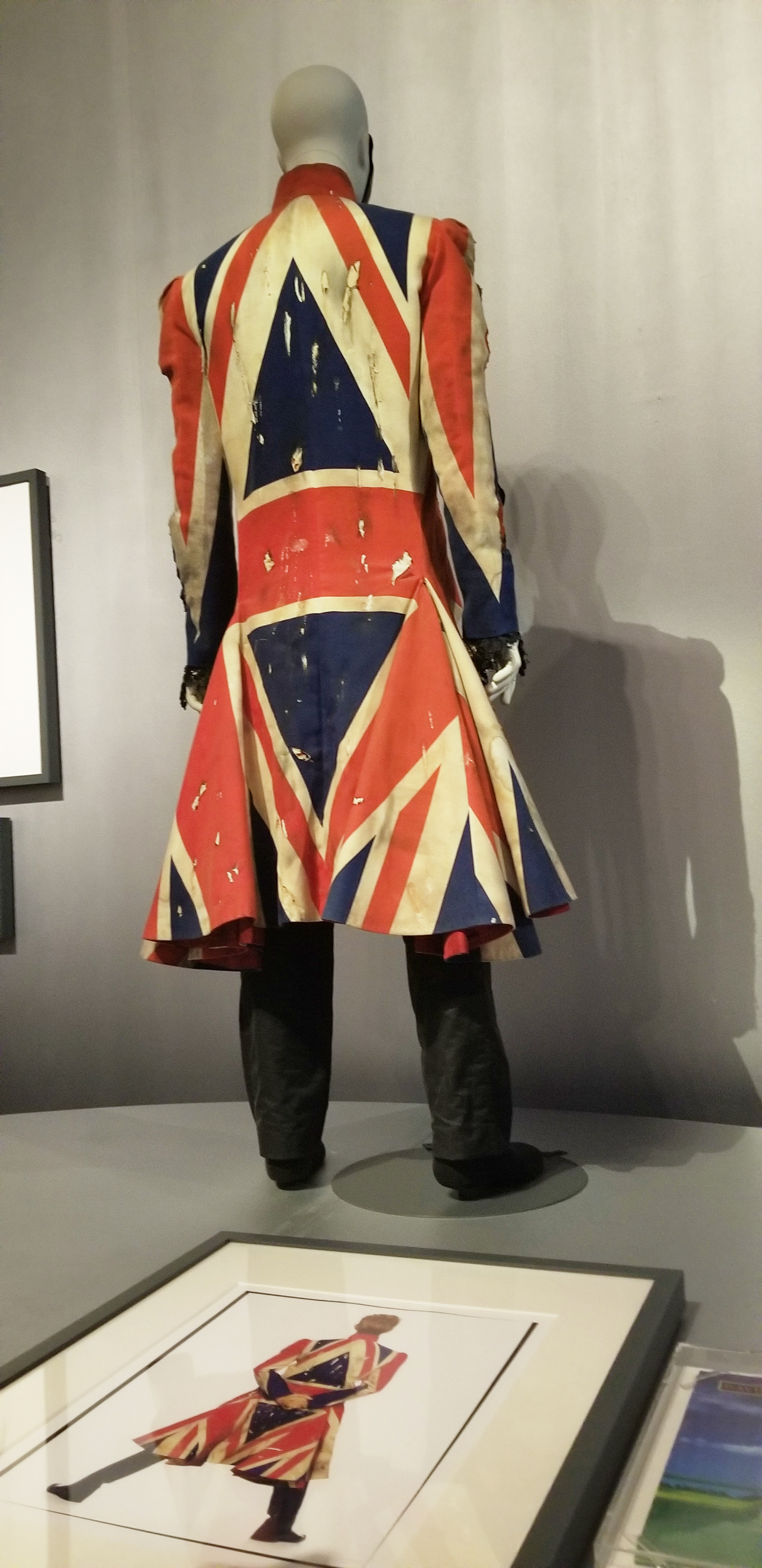
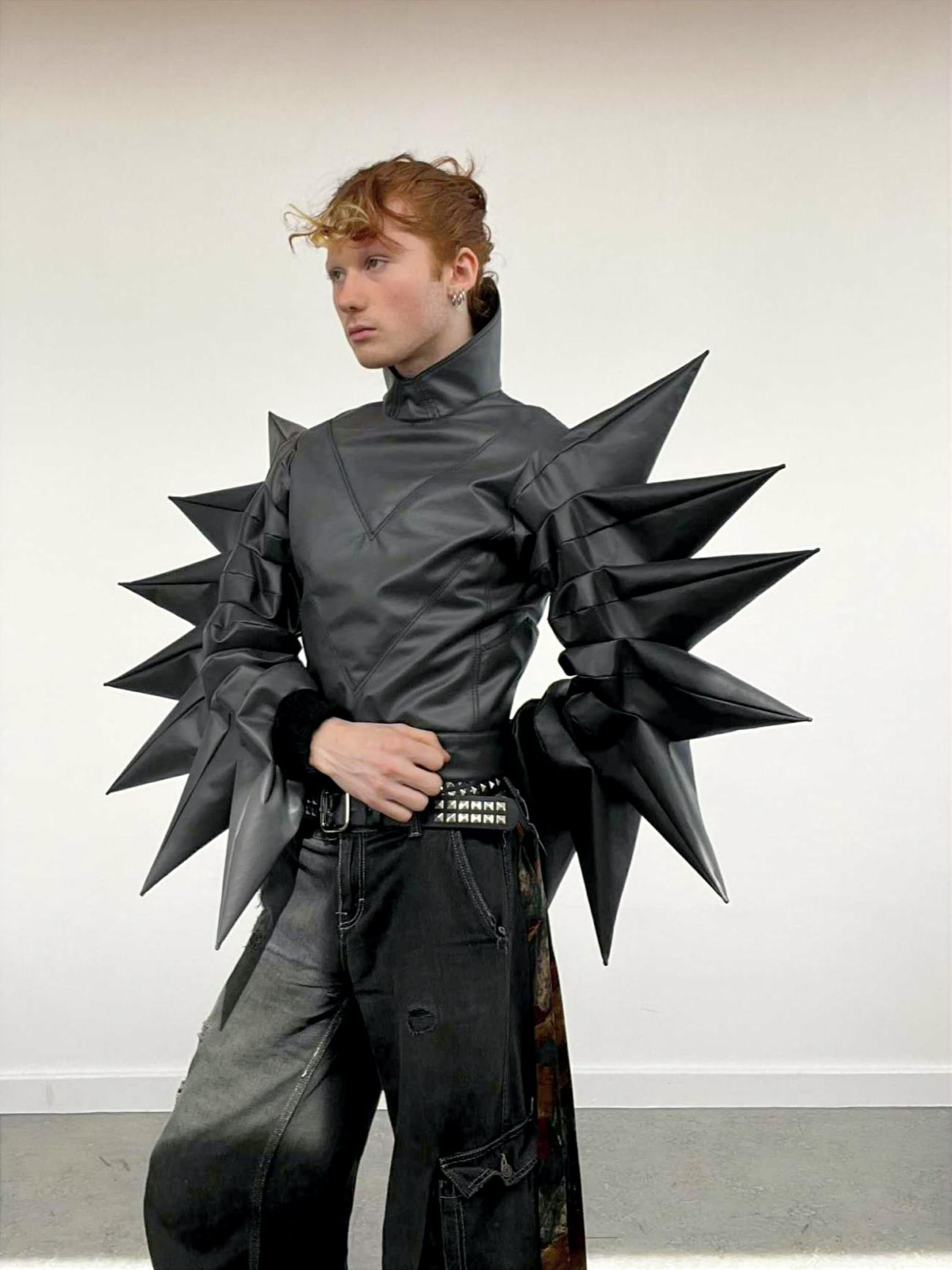
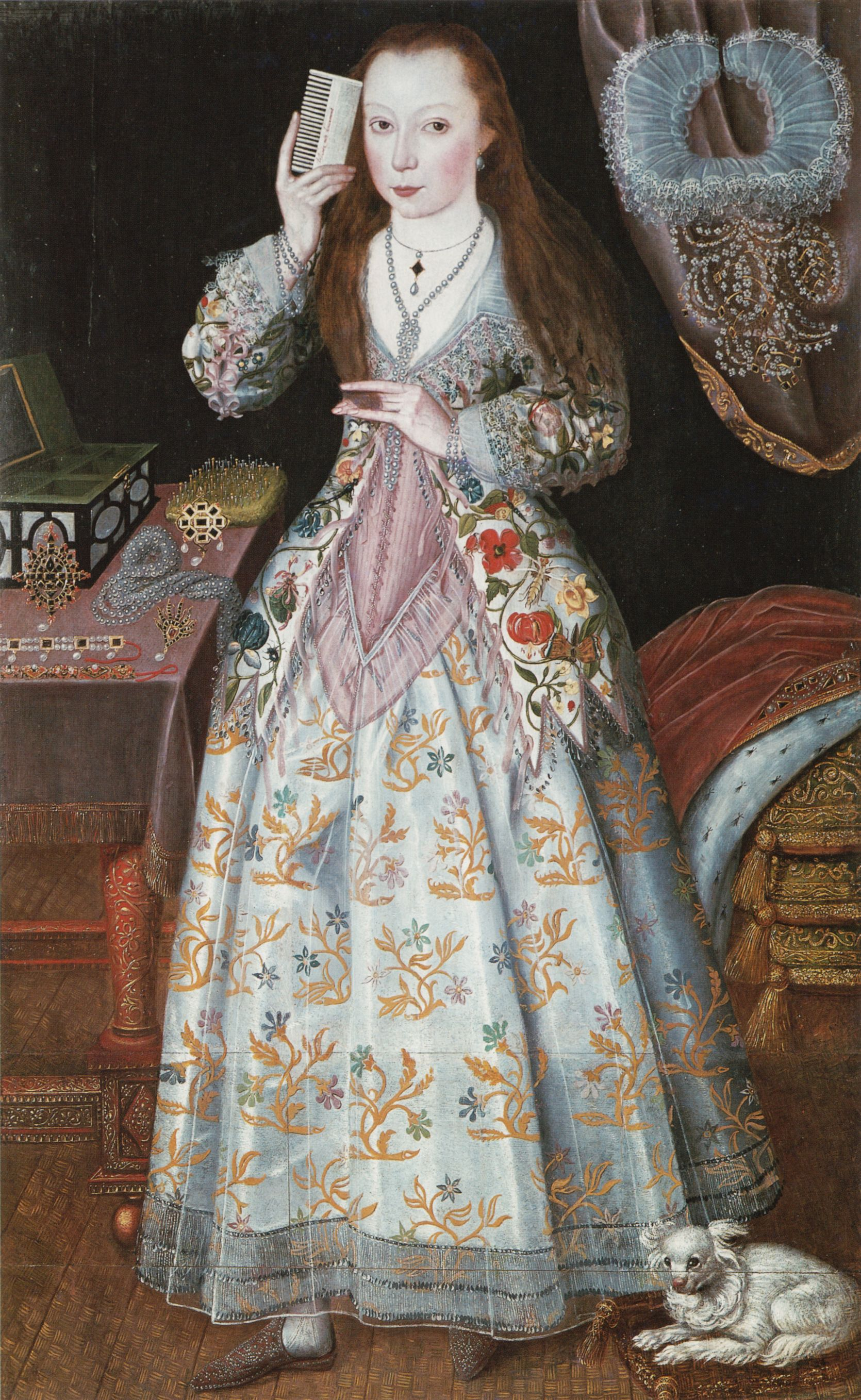
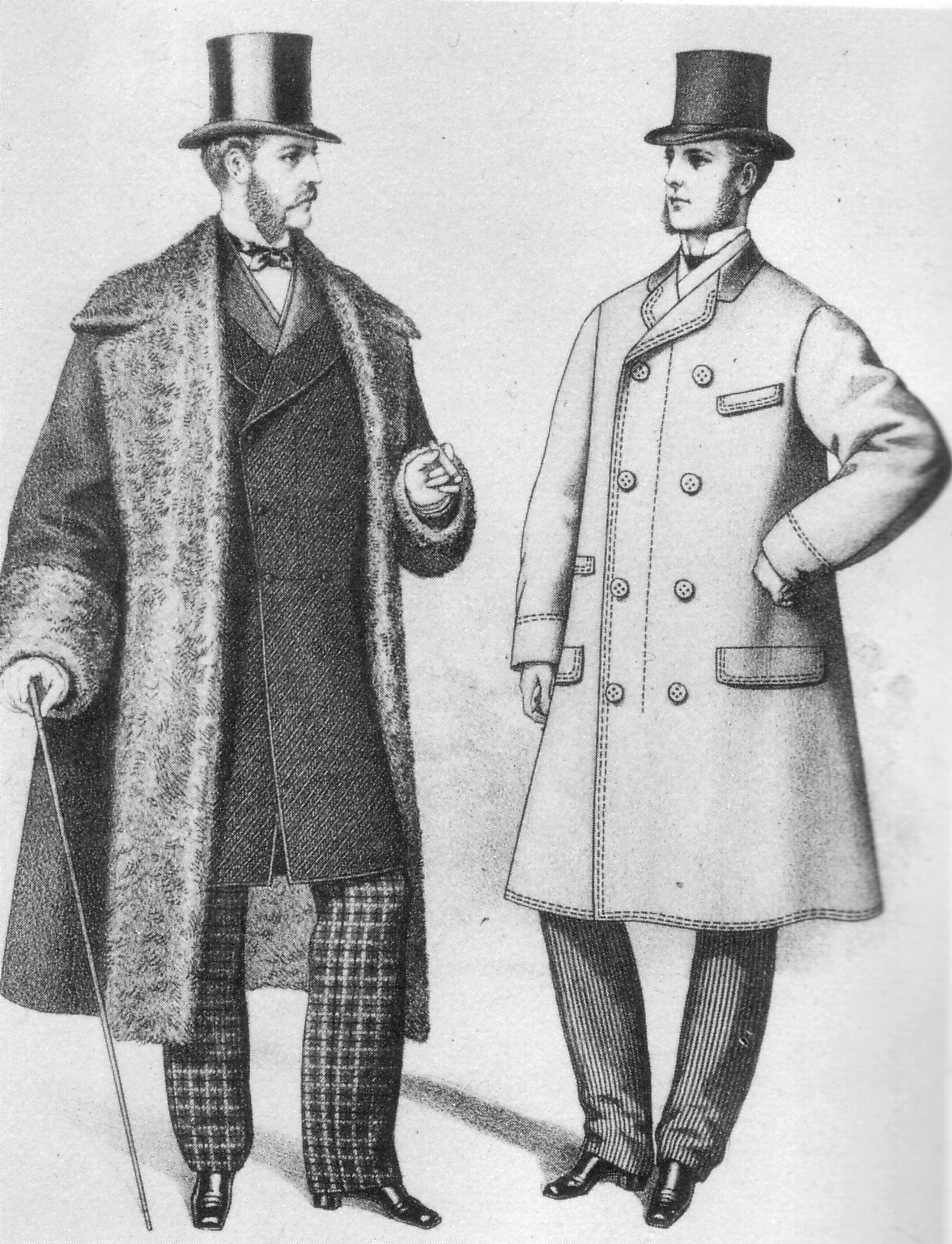
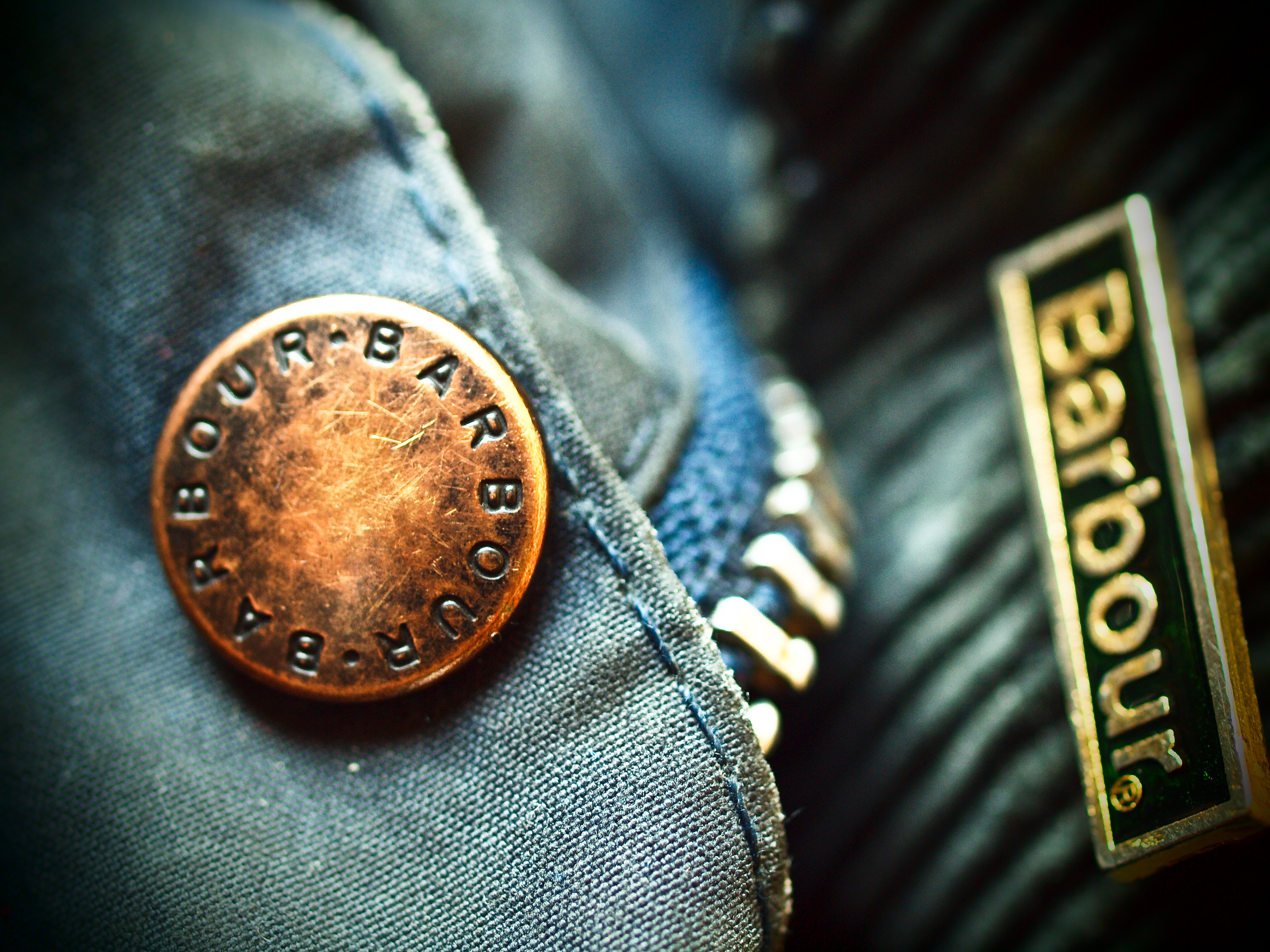
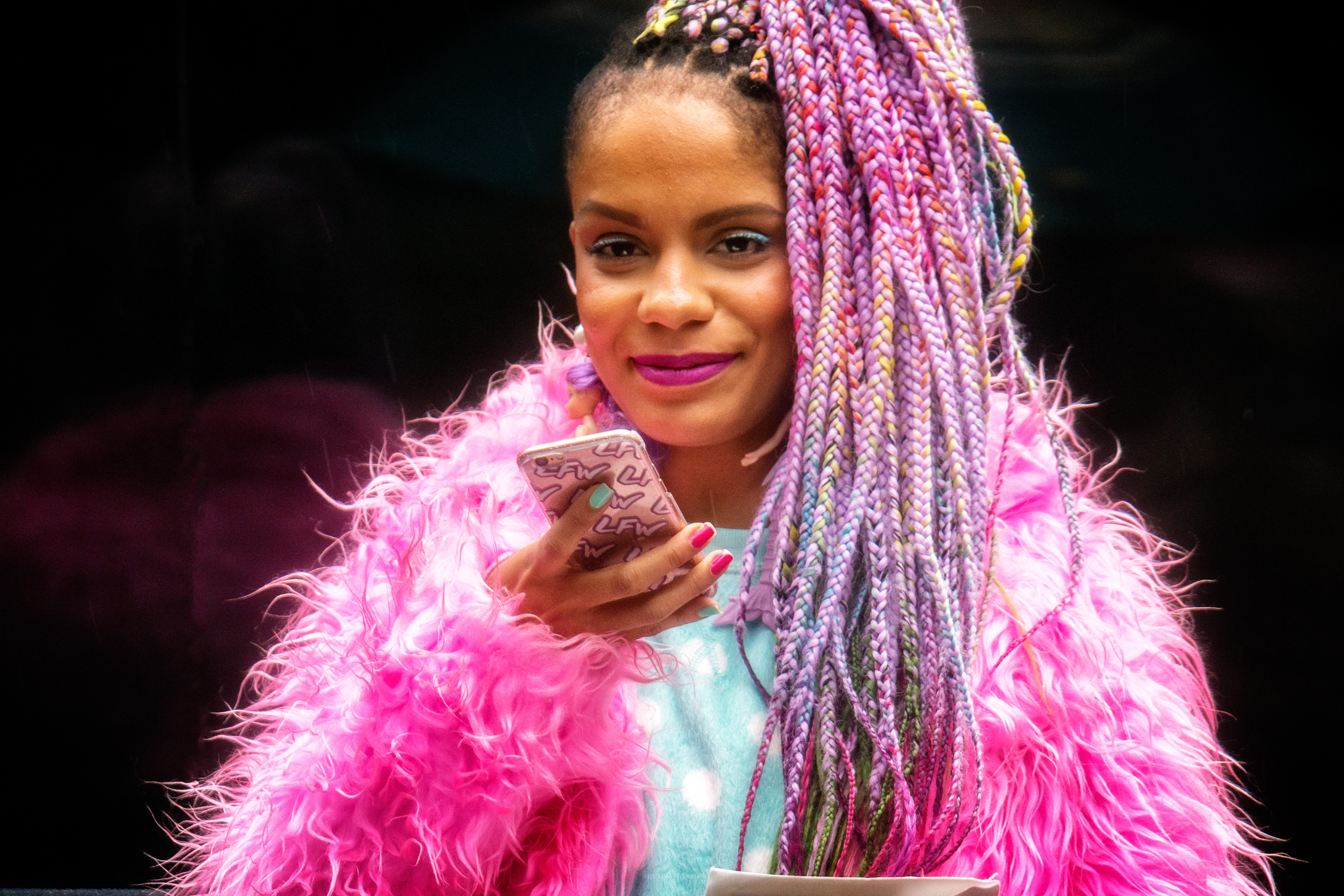
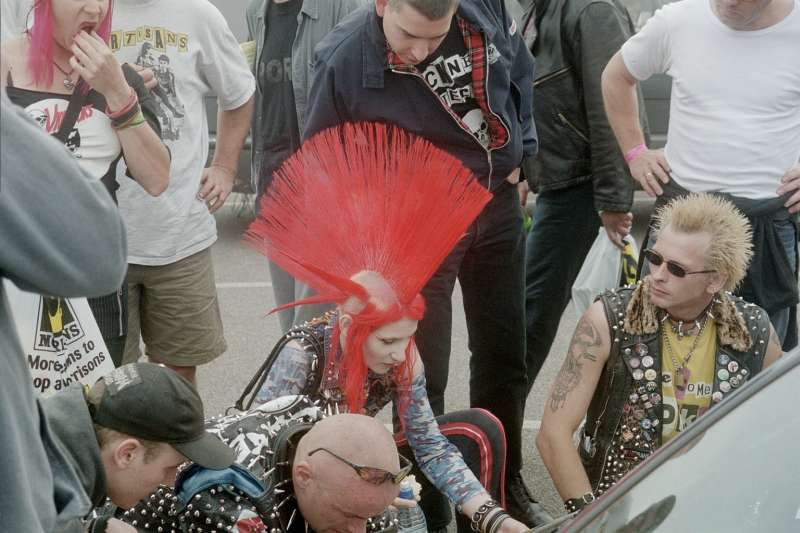
Clockwise from top: Union Jack coat designed by Alexander McQueen for David Bowie (1996), University of the West of England fashion student modelling his own work (2025), engraving of two Victorian gentlemen (1872), Magá Moura (fashion influencer) at London Fashion Week (2016), punks in Morecambe, Lancashire (2003), the company Barbour is synonymous with the British country clothing style, Elizabeth Vernon wears an embroidered linen jacket over a rose-pink corset (1590s).

British fashion refers to the distinctive styles, design, and aesthetic values that have developed across the United Kingdom, drawing on the diverse cultural traditions, craftsmanship, and materials of England, Scotland, Wales, and Northern Ireland. Renowned for its blend of heritage and innovation, British fashion has played a significant role in shaping global trends; from the formal tailoring of Savile Row to the rebellious subcultures of mod and punk. It reflects the complex historical social structures, regional identities, and evolving cultural attitudes found throughout the UK.

In the 18th and 19th centuries, London became a hub for refined tailoring, while Scottish tweed, Welsh wool, and Irish linen industries supplied essential materials. Victorian and Edwardian fashion reflected strict class-based dress codes, while the 20th century brought dramatic shifts, from wartime utility to the avant-garde spirit of designers like Mary Quant and Vivienne Westwood, who captured the boldness of youth culture and challenged conventions.

Today, British fashion remains highly influential on the world stage, and celebrated for its diversity, creativity, and historical depth. The UK is home to globally recognised fashion houses, prestigious fashion schools, and high-street brands with international reach, while events like London Fashion Week showcase both established designers and emerging talent. Contemporary British fashion encompasses a wide range of styles, from sustainable and minimalist to eccentric and vintage-inspired, sometimes engaging with contemporary issues of identity, inclusion, and environmental responsibility.

== Historical ==
=== Early Modern Period (1500s–1700s) ===
The Tudor, Elizabethan, Jacobean, Stuart, and Georgian eras are remembered for their aristocratic fashion, elaborate garments, and the influence of courtly styles. The introduction of structured tailoring and the development of Britain's textile industries gave rise to more fitted and sculptural silhouettes, such as doublets, hose, farthingales, and tailored coats, as well as an expansive luxury fabrics trade that both signified and reinforced social hierarchy.

=== Industrial and Victorian Britain (1800s–early 1900s) ===
Fashion in the Regency, Victorian, and Edwardian eras was defined by the mass production of clothing, the growth of the middle classes, and strong associations between fashion and social status. Advances in textile manufacturing, and the introduction of the sewing machine, made fashionable clothing more widely available; helping to standardise styles across social classes. Formal wear, mourning dress, and strict fashion etiquette dominated the period, with detailed rules guiding what to wear for different occasions, or even times of day. Women’s fashion moved from the high-waisted silhouettes of the Regency era to the structured corsets and full skirts of the Victorian age, while men adopted increasingly tailored suits and formal accessories. Dress during this time was less about personal taste, and more about an individual's role and respectability within a rigid social hierarchy.

=== 20th century modernity (1910s–1990s) ===
Against the backdrop of two world wars, fashion in the first half of the 20th century moved away from the formal styles and strict etiquette that had dominated the 1800s, with more practical and muted styles dominating. Post-war freedoms, shifts in traditional gender roles, growing youth influence, and political change gave rise to movements such as hippy culture, then later still, music-subcultures such as mod, punk and goth, all of which developed their own distinctive fashion styles and trends.

New materials and technological advances in manufacturing gave opportunities for a new wave of celebrity designers, with designers like Mary Quant, Vivienne Westwood, and Alexander McQueen going on to be influential on the world stage.

== Contemporary British fashion ==
Contemporary British fashion is marked by the co-existence of a wide range of styles, reflecting a level of diversity and fluidity that sets it apart from earlier decades. While the 20th century saw distinct movements dominate at different times, today’s landscape embraces simultaneous influences. Modern priorities such as sustainability, gender fluidity, inclusivity, and slow fashion have shaped new expressions of British style, often blending heritage with innovation. While interest in heritage styles, such as British country clothing, continues to grow globally, some traditional brands like Lyle & Scott have refocused their appeal towards youth and urban markets, paving the way for a new generation of designers. Labels such as A-COLD-WALL* have gained international recognition, reinforcing the UK's status as a centre for streetwear. London Fashion Week is a major global event, showcasing both established names and emerging designers from the UK’s influential art and fashion schools.

== See also ==
- British Fashion Council
- British Fashion Awards
- List of fashion designers § United Kingdom
