= Sian Westerman =

Sian Eleri Angharad Westerman (born 1962) is a British banker and co-chair of the BFC Fashion Trust. She is a trustee of the Royal Academy Trust which supports the Royal Academy of Arts, and a past trustee of English National Ballet.

== Early life and education ==
Westerman was educated at Manchester High School for Girls and has a degree in English law with French from the University of Birmingham, for two years of which she studied in Limoges.

== Career ==
Westerman initially worked as a trainee solicitor at Slaughter and May but has said that she "felt quite far down the food chain and it seemed to me then that everything happens before the lawyers get pulled in". She moved into banking, joining Rothschild and was Managing Director Global Financial Advisory from 2003 to 2013. She is now a senior advisor at Rothschild, specialising in the retail and luxury sector.

She joined the board of fashion accessories designer Anya Hindmarch in 2005 for six years, and after the 2008 financial crisis became involved with the British Fashion Council, advising young designers on financial matters. After a time living in Hong Kong she returned to the UK and became co-chair, with Tania Fares, of BFC Fashion Trust, a charity set up by the BFC to support young British designers. She is a board member or mentor to several fashion companies.
