= Cappellini =

Cappellini and Capellini are Italian surnames, possibly derivatives of Capelli or Capello. It is also used as a Spanish surname. Notable people with those surnames include:

- Ada Itúrrez de Cappellini, Argentine Justicialist Party politician
- Anna Cappellini, Italian ice dancer
- Antonio Capellini (born c. 1730), Italian engraver
- Gabriele Cappellini (active c. 1520), Italian painter
- Giovanni Capellini (1833–1922), Italian geologist and paleontologist, Senator of the Kingdom of Italy
- Giulio Cappellini, owner of Italian design firm Cappellini
- Massimiliano Cappellini, retired Italian professional football player
- Nicola Capellini (born 1991), Italian footballer
- Renato Cappellini, retired Italian professional football player
- Rinaldo E. Cappellini (1895–1966), UMWA District 1 President (PA), 1923 and 1925
- Gifford S. Cappellini (1925–2016), Judge, Court of Common Pleas, Luzerne County, PA 1985–2005

== See also ==
- Alfredo Cappellini (S 507), an Italian submarine
- Comandante Cappellini, an Italian submarine
- Capelli (disambiguation)
- Capello (disambiguation)
