= Foundation for Maya Cultural and Natural Heritage =

UNESCO site

Foundation for Maya Cultural and Natural Heritage (PACUNAM)
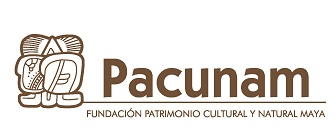
- Founded: 2006
- Location: Guatemala, Guatemala
- Region served: Guatemala
- Method: Conservation
- Website: pacunam.org

The Foundation for Maya Cultural and Natural Heritage (PACUNAM) is an organization of visionary corporations committed to the preservation of Guatemala's natural and cultural heritage through sustainable development for the benefit of future generations. One of PACUNAM's priorities is the conservation of the Maya Biosphere Reserve.

PACUNAM's main objectives are:

- Provide financial support for the study of strategic archaeological sites within the Maya Biosphere Reserve in order to protect it as an ecological and cultural system.
- Develop the Carmelita-Mirador route as a sustainable tourist circuit to provide revenue for local communities.
- Support the Conservation Incentive Program in local communities, in order to make biodiversity conservation a viable choice for users of local resources.
- Encourage international cultural exchanges through events, seminars, conferences, workshops, and exhibits.

PACUNAM supports initiatives that promote sustainable development in the country in three strategic areas: archaeological research, environmental conservation and sustainable economic activities.

== Strategic areas ==
=== Support to archaeological research, restoration and preservation ===
Program dedicated to the rescue, restoration, consolidation and preservation of archaeological sites, such as the Mirador Basin, Holmul, La Corona, Cival and Naachtún. Also, they support expositions worldwide, such as the one in the Quai Branly museum in Paris, France, named "The Maya Civilization: From Dawn until Dusk". The archaeological discoveries that have been made in the archaeological field have expanded the information that is known of the Maya Civilization.

The Maya Biosphere Reserve is a tempting location for the people that do illegal activities: Mayan ruins not protected from looters, jungles filled with precious wood for woodcutters, virgin land for illegal occupiers and new routes for drug trafficking. The archaeological projects have proven to be a key component to stop these situations. PACUNAM is focusing its support in archaeological sites that contribute to having a physical presence during all year and generate scientific results and discoveries that attract global attention and show the value of the Mayan culture.

=== Sustainable economic activities ===
PACUNAM supports the development of economic activities linked to community development done in a sustainable manner. This is achieved through the support to the development and strengthening of sustainable forestry that contributes to the protection of natural resources through a controlled operation, and with the implementation of projects aimed to help develop the tourism potential of natural and archaeological resources, encouraging new productive activities in conjunction with the communities.

=== Conservation of the environment ===
Focused on the conservation of the Maya Biosphere Reserve, taking into account the protection of tropical forest, flora and fauna of the region. In addition, they support national programs that have a positive impact in environmental conservation in Guatemala. Through partnerships, they host forums on strategic issues and implement projects aimed at conserving the environment through payment of environmental services and incentives for conservation, among others. "The legacy of conservation has intentionally been designed as exclusive of non-white, Indigenous, and working-class peoples in both rural and urban settings" .

== External sources ==
- Official Site
