= Mytheresa =

German luxury e-commerce platform

- Company type: Public GmbH
- Available in: English, German, French, Italian, Spanish, Arabic, Chinese, Korean
- Traded as: NYSE: LUXE
- Founded: 2006
- Headquarters: Munich, Germany
- Area served: Worldwide
- Managing director: Francis Belin, Dominik Laß, Julian Paul, Simon Tweed
- Industry: Luxury, E-commerce
- Products: Luxury and lifestyle goods
- Revenue: €994.3 million Net Sales in fiscal year 2026 (ended June 2026)
- Parent: LuxExperience B.V.
- Website: mytheresa.com

Mytheresa.com is part of the listed e-commerce group LuxExperience B.V. and operates in the luxury fashion sector based in Munich, Germany. Mytheresa sells ready-to-wear, shoes, bags, and accessories for womenswear, menswear and kidswear as well as lifestyle products and jewelry globally.

Since 2025, it is part of LuxExperience, which also owns Net-A-Porter, Mr Porter, and Yoox.

== History ==
=== Origins and Early Growth (1987–2014) ===
In 1987, Susanne and Christoph Botschen opened the "Theresa" boutique in Munich city center, where they sold designer fashion for women. In 2006, the couple supplemented the physical store by founding an online store, Mytheresa, which offers ready-to-wear, shoes, accessories, and fine jewelry from more than 250 designers. In 2014, Mytheresa was acquired by Neiman Marcus Group.

In March 2015, Michael Kliger was appointed CEO. The company subsequently expanded its global reach, launching localized websites in French, Italian, Arabic, Chinese, Korean, and Spanish alongside its German and English platforms, shipping to more than 130 countries.

Mytheresa expanded its offering to include kidswear in 2019, menswear in 2020.

=== Independence and IPO (2020–2021) ===
In May 2020, after Neiman Marcus filed for Chapter 11 bankruptcy, Mytheresa was carved out of the bankruptcy estate by financial investors and temporarily financed via shareholder loans of US$200 million. In January 2021, the immediate parent company, MYT Netherlands, was listed on the NYSE, resulting in US$407 million in issue proceeds, which were used to repay the shareholder loans. The remainder of the proceeds was used to finance the company's strong growth.

In 2022, Mytheresa expanded its luxury offering to include home décor and lifestyle products with the introduction of the “Life” category. In 2023, the range was supplemented with Certified Pre-Owned watches in collaboration with Bucherer, and the Fine Jewelry category was further expanded. In autumn 2023, Mytheresa opened a new 55,000 m^{2} distribution center at Halle/Leipzig Airport.

=== Expansion and YNAP Acquisition (2022–2025) ===
In October 2024, it was announced that MYT Netherlands Parents B.V., the immediate parent, would acquire Richemont's online luxury fashion and accessories business Yoox Net-A-Porter (YNAP), subject to regulatory approval, in exchange for Richemont acquiring a 33% equity stake in Mytheresa.

In April 2025, Mytheresa acquired YNAP from Richemont. As of May 1, 2025, the parent company MYT Netherlands Parent B.V. was renamed LuxExperience B.V.

== Leadership ==
Effective January 1, 2026, Francis Belin assumed the position of CEO at Mytheresa. Prior to this, the manager served as president for the Asia-Pacific region at the auction house Christie's, bringing with him expertise from previous roles at Swarovski and Richemont. Belin succeeded Michael Kliger, who transitioned into the role of CEO of the parent company, LuxExperience, after more than ten years at the helm of Mytheresa.

== Operations ==
The company operates websites in English, German, French, Italian, Arabic, Chinese, Korean, and Spanish, delivering to over 130 countries.

== See also ==
- YOOX Net-a-Porter Group
- Farfetch
- Gilt Groupe
- Luxury goods
