= British Fashion Council =

Organization promoting British fashion

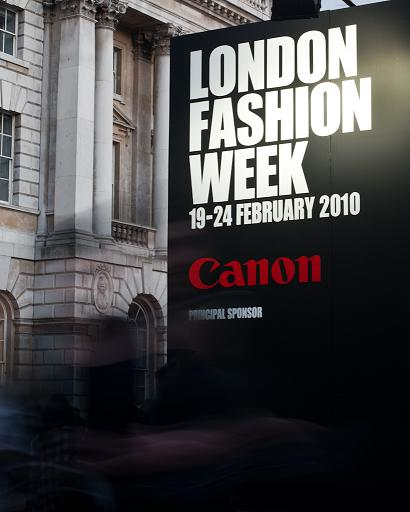
- London Fashion Week is organised by British Fashion Council
- Formation: 6 January 1983; 43 years ago
- Purpose: Promote British fashion in the UK and internationally
- Headquarters: Soho Works, 180 The Strand, London WC2R 1EA
- Leader: Laura Weir
- Website: British Fashion Council

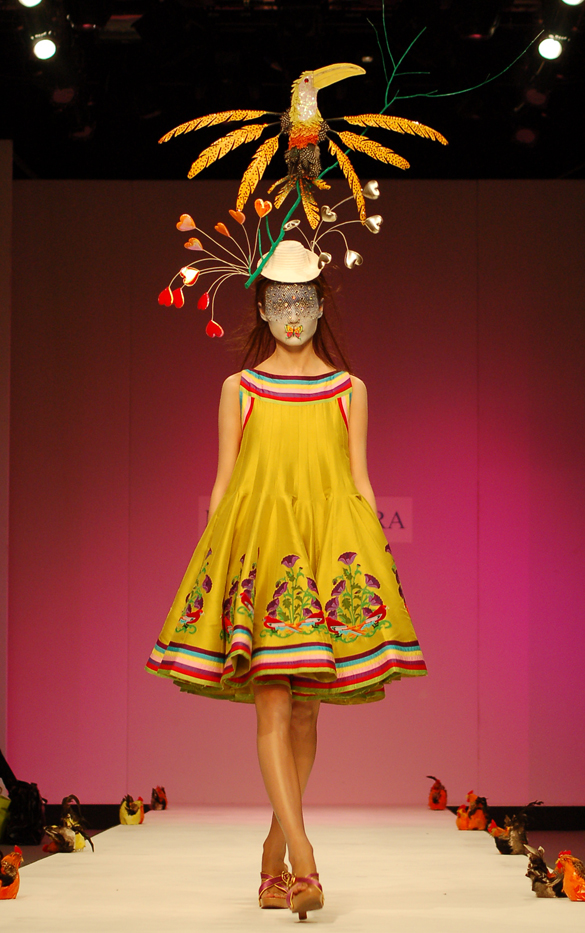
Manish Arora designs at London Fashion Week 2007

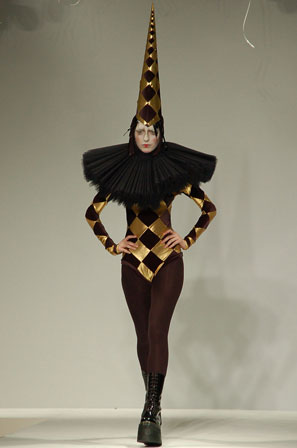
Gareth Pugh fashion at London Fashion Week 2006

The British Fashion Council (BFC) is a non-profit organization that aims to enable sustainable growth of the British fashion industry in the global fashion economy. Founded in 1983, the BFC organizes biannual Women's wear and Men's wear showcases, London Fashion Week (LFW) and London Fashion Week Men's (LFWM) to promote "the best of British design" to an international audience.

== Leadership and activities ==
Based in London, the British Fashion Council (BFC) is currently chaired by David Pemsel. Pemsel was appointed in September 2022, succeeding Stephanie Phair who held the position for four and a half years from May 2018. Since 2009, Caroline Rush CBE served as the organization's chief executive officer. Laura Weir was appointed chief executive officer in April 2025. Previous Chairs of the BFC have included Natalie Massenet, Edward Rayne, Sir Nicholas Coleridge CBE, Harold Tillman, and Sir Stuart Rose.

In May 2018, BFC appointed former England football team captain, David Beckham, as its new Ambassadorial President.

2020 saw a number of organizational changes within the BFC, including four new appointments to its board of directors on 4 September. The newly appointed directors; Jamie Gill, June Sarpong, Scott Morrison and Sian Westerman joined the remaining board membership of Stephanie Phair (chairperson), Dylan Jones, Caroline Rush, Laura Strain, and David Pemsel.

The Council created a new committee entitled the Diversity and Inclusion Steering Committee on 16 September 2020.

In November 2020, the BFC presented Indian actress Priyanka Chopra Jonas with the new title of ambassador for Positive Change. The new BFC role was created with the aim to use fashion as a ‘source for good’, to raise awareness of best practices within the industry including affirming principles that support inclusivity and positive ethics.

Joining other technology companies and fashion brands, Rakuten added its name to the list of BFC Patrons in 2021.

== Development of the organization ==
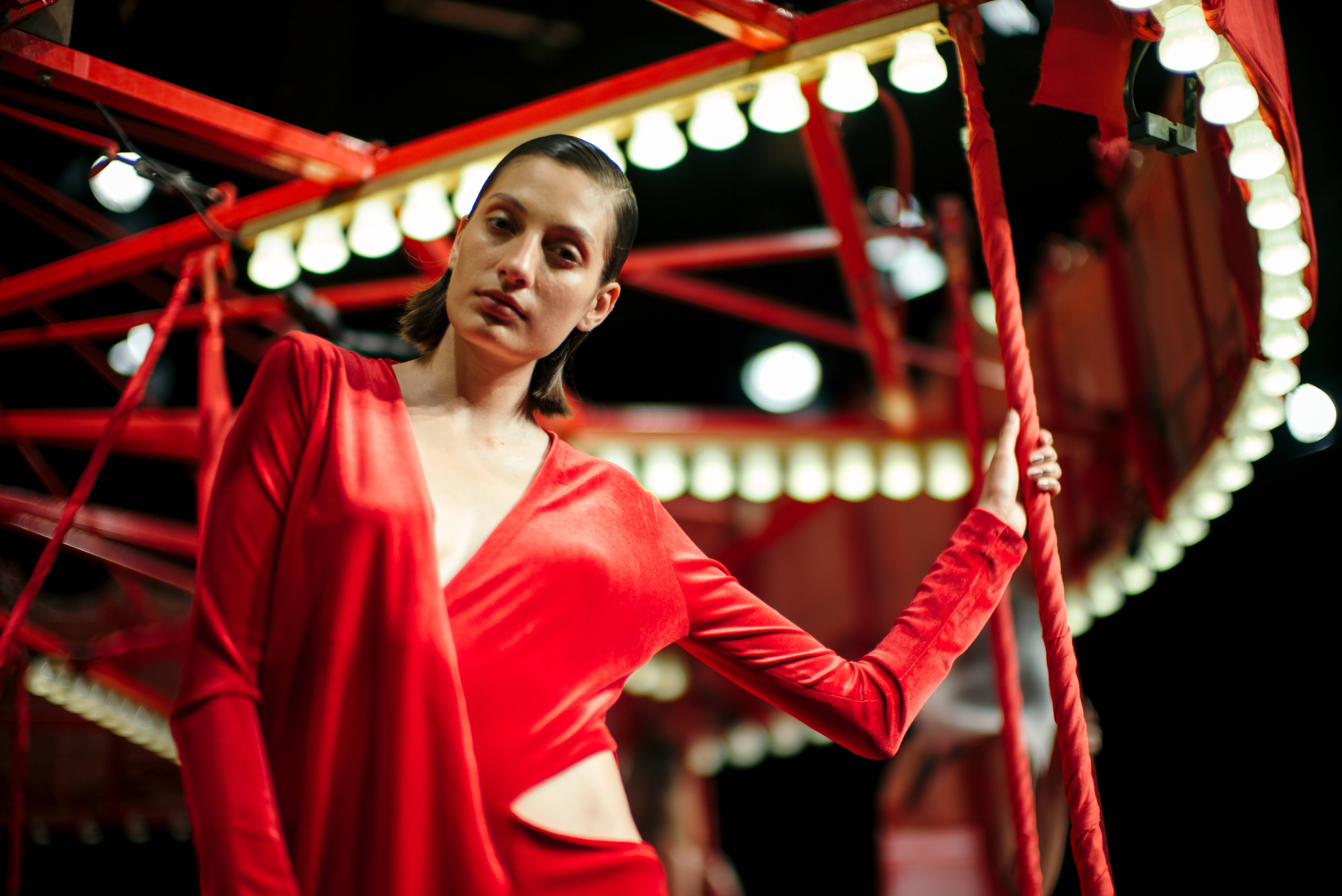
LFW Carousel

The British Fashion Council (BFC) was established in 1983 as a non-profit limited company. Prior to the establishment of a single body to promote the interests of the British fashion industry, there were a number of organizations that existed to promote different interests within British fashion. These included:

- Incorporated Society of London Fashion Designers (founded 1941/2)
- London Model House Group (1950)
- Fashion House Group of London (1958)
- Clothing Export Council (1965)
- London Designer Collections (1965)
- Fashion Industry Action Group (1981)

== Events ==
The BFC's primary event is London Fashion Week, a bi-annual London-bamore thanover 250 international designers and engages a worldwide audience. The fashion week is organized by the BFC alongside other organizations.

In light of the COVID-19 pandemic, the BFC announced that its 2020 February trade show would be held as a digital-only event. All event attractions, from the launch of the week on Friday 14 February 2020, were presented to a global audience online. The event production crews, designers, models, and teams were assisted by Westminster Council with rapid Covid testing to ensure the success and safety of the event. Princess Anne followed in the Queen’s footsteps to present a special award at the event. The Queen Elizabeth II Award for British Design was awarded to Rosh Mahtani who was commended for the craftsmanship of her jewellery.

During the February 2020 Fashion Week, the BFC announced its scheme to enable one young designer to show their collection before a virtual audience. The new initiative was made possible in collaboration with MTV.

Following its February virtual showcase event, the BFC announced that it was to merge the Men’s Fashion Week into a new and single, "gender-neutral" event.

=== Coronavirus Foundation Fashion Fund ===
In response to the global pandemic restrictions and its move to showcasing fashion virtually, the BFC began to advocate increased support for fashion freelancers experiencing hardship and business disruption. The British government were encouraged to put further policies in place to protect those being negatively affected.

Later in March 2020, the council launched its first coronavirus relief fund, committed to supporting those in the industry. The crisis relief fund aims to raise £50 million for struggling designers.

In May 2020, the Foundation Fashion Fund announced its first recipients of the £1,000,000 emergency fund. The fund was split between 37 different UK recipients.

=== The Black in Fashion Council ===
In response to the global reaction to the George Floyd tragedy and the Black Lives Matter protests, the British Fashion Council chief called upon the industry to take further action against racism.

The fashion industry was called to account for its longstanding cultural appropriation and lack of diversity, which led to a partnership of 38 organizations generating the Black in Fashion Council, including the British Fashion Council.

As part of its individual response to the Black Lives Matter movement, the British Fashion Council launched its own project celebrating Black British culture and fashion. The project included a variety of programmed events, concluding with an exhibition showcasing the work in the summer of 2022.

== Awards, nominations and prizes ==
- 16 November 2016 – The British Fashion council awarded Gucci’s New Creative Director, Alessandro Michele, the International Designer Award.
- 2 September 2020 – As part of its £500,000 grant scheme, the British Fashion Council distributed grants to 30 British labels, including Emilia Wickstead, Preen by Thornton Bregazzi, Rokh and Charles Jeffrey Loverboy.
- 5 October 2020 – The University of Salford and the Central Saint Martins Royal College of Art has announced recipients of the British Fashion Council MA Scholarship. The recipients of the scholarships were selected from these institutions based on financial need and aptitude.
- 15 October 2020 – The British Fashion Council announced 2020 Fashion Awards would be held as a virtual event on 3 December. As part of the ceremony, 20 winners were celebrated for their resilience during the pandemic, and their determination to see change within the industry. Awards for Community were presented by Priyanka Chopra Jonas, awards for People presented by Lewis Hamilton, awards for Environment presented by Aja Barber and Maisie Williams, and awards for Creativity were presented by Rosalía.
- 18 February 2021 – The BFC announced the shortlist of designers in line for receiving the prestigious BFC/Vogue Designer Fashion Fund. From the shortlisted 11, Bethany Williams was named as the winner.
- 16 February 2022 – A shortlist of 8 designers was announced for the 2022 BFC/Vogue Designer Fashion Fund. The 2022 winner was Richard Quinn.

== See also ==
- Arab Fashion Council
- Council of Fashion Designers of America
- Fédération de la Haute Couture et de la Mode
- National Chamber of Italian Fashion
- The Fashion Awards
