= Lucy Yeomans =

Magazine editor

- Education: University of St Andrews
- Occupation: Magazine editor
- Known for: Creator and founder of fashion website DREST
- Notable credit(s): Net-a-Porter; Harpers & Queen; Harper's Bazaar

Lucy Yeomans is creator and founder of DREST, previously editor-in-chief of fashion website Net-a-Porter and editor of the fashion magazine Harper's Bazaar in the UK.

== Career ==
Yeomans graduated from the University of St Andrews in 1992 and began her writing career a year later in Paris, France, where she was arts editor and then editor of the English-language lifestyle monthly Boulevard. While in Paris, she freelanced for publications including The Daily Telegraph and The Sunday Times. On her return to the UK in 1996, she was appointed features editor of The European newspaper, reporting on news, culture and fashion from across Europe.

She moved to Tatler in 1997 as features editor, becoming senior features editor less than a year later and deputy editor just a few months after that. Yeomans was appointed deputy editor of Vogue in 2000 but was offered, and accepted, the position as editor-in-chief of Harpers & Queen at lunchtime on her first day. She took up the role in November 2000.

In 2006, Yeomans oversaw the successful transition of Harpers & Queen to Harper's Bazaar and in May 2007 Harper’s Bazaar picked up the top award at the PPA Awards and was named, Consumer Magazine of the Year beating Vogue, Grazia, Heat, and other titles to take the main award. She was also named in December by The Independent as one of the Media 50: Newsmakers of 2007. The newspaper wrote that Lucy Yeomans is – "one of the most glamorous and best-connected women in magazine publishing, Yeomans has completed a long journey to reposition her title, Harper's Bazaar, taking it step by step from society handbook to a fashion bible for aspirational young women."

In 2012, after 12 years as the editor of Harper's Bazaar, Yeomans became the global content director of Net-a-Porter, launching first the company's weekly digital magazine The Edit in 2013, followed in the spring of 2014 by the acclaimed global fashion bi-monthly print magazine Porter, of which she held the position editor-in-chief and oversaw the magazine's highly successful Incredible Women franchise.

In February 2019, Yeomans left Net-a-Porter to set up her own fashion and technology business. In October 2019, she announced via Business of Fashion the launch of her innovative fashion platform called DREST.
