= YOOX Net-a-Porter Group =

Italian online fashion retailer

YOOX Net-a-Porter Group S.p.A.
- Industry: Fashion and leisure
- Founded: 5 October 2015; 10 years ago
- Founder: Natalie Massenet; Federico Marchetti
- Area served: Worldwide
- Products: Fashion products
- Brands: Net-A-Porter; Mr Porter; YOOX
- Parent: LuxExperience B.V.

YOOX Net-a-Porter Group S.p.A. (YNAP) is an Italian online fashion retailer created in October 2015 after the merger between Yoox Group and Net-a-porter Group (NAP), companies founded in 2000. While Yoox was founded by Federico Marchetti in Milan, NAP was established by Natalie Massenet in London.

After initiating its investments in the company in 2003, Richemont sold its NAP shares to Yoox in 2015, when the latter decided to merge its operations with the newly acquired company. However, in May 2018, Richemont bought 95% of the available shares of YNAP.

The combined company has become a global e-commerce player that serves more than 180 countries. YNAP posted a €1.46 billion loss in 2023, and in October 2024 Richemont agreed to sell Yoox Net-A-Porter to Mytheresa.

In April 2025, Mytheresa closed its acquisition of YOOX Net-a-Porter. Following the acquisition, the newly formed group LuxExperience B.V. is the sole shareholder of Net-a-Porter, Mr Porter and Yoox next to Mytheresa.

== History ==
=== Net-a-Porter Group ===
Net-a-Porter founder Natalie Massenet is an American-born former fashion journalist with Women's Wear Daily and Tatler. She developed the concept of a magazine in website format where users could 'click' to buy while trying to source product online for a fashion shoot. Having raised the £1.2m (approx $2m) start-up costs with the assistance of her then-husband and co-founder Arnaud Massenet, they launched the company from Massenet's flat in Chelsea, London.

In the early days, the operation was so low-key that the company's black delivery boxes were stacked up in the bathtub. Initially, designers and investors were reluctant to support Net-a-Porter because it lacked a physical retail outlet. Massenet recalled the credibility gap in a 2013 interview in The Observer: "They'd listen and they'd nod and then afterwards they'd say, 'Just tell me one more thing: where is your store?'" However, in 2001, Roland Mouret was persuaded to sell his collection via the website. By 2004, the same year in which it won best fashion shop at the British Fashion Awards, the company was profitable.

In 2010, Massenet sold a majority stake in Net-a-Porter to Swiss luxury goods holding company Richemont for an estimated £50m. She remains an investor and executive chairwoman. At the time it was bought by Richemont in 2010, Net-a-Porter was valued at $533 million. The Outnet, a site focusing on previous seasons' designs at discount prices, was launched in 2009; in 2011, a menswear site, Mr Porter, was established under the stewardship of Toby Bateman who then said: "The original concept around the Mr Porter customer was that he was the man in the Net-A-Porter girl's life." Bateman left Mr Porter in 2019 and was replaced by Fiona Firth as managing director.

In 2013 beauty was launched under the leadership of David Olsen. In August 2014, The Outnet launched a partnership with Victoria Beckham to sell items of her clothing to raise funds for the nonprofit organization mothers2mothers to educate women about HIV/AIDS in Africa.

The business continues to grow and in 2013 it retailed products from more than 350 designers, attracted more than two million monthly visitors to the site and an average spend of £500 (around $850). Brands it retails include Stella McCartney, Yves Saint Laurent and Diane von Furstenberg. Labels such as Alexander Wang, Yves Saint Laurent and RM by Roland Mouret have created capsule collections specifically for the site. Writing in The Observer in 2010, Eva Wiseman noted that being stocked by Net-a-Porter is becoming important to designers as it: "not only guarantees new customers but its [Net-a-Porter's] credibility gives a fashion brand value".

As of September 2013, Net-a-Porter employed 2,600 people in the UK, US, and Hong Kong, with further offices in Shanghai and fulfillment centres on the outskirts of three cities. In early 2014, Net-a-Porter launched a print magazine called Porter, with an associated app and digital version of the magazine. Some 400,000 copies will be distributed six times a year in 60 countries. Playing off of its name, Net-a-Porter recently added a sportswear section to their website called Net-a-Sporter. The sportswear section of the website was launched in July 2014. When speaking of the addition of Net-a-Sporter to the e-tailer's online roster, the company's president Alison Loehnis said "We spotted a gap in the market for being a one-stop shop for workout wear where fashion meets function and where performance and style are equally valued." In August 2014, Massenet revealed that she originally wanted to call the website "What's New, Pussycat?"

=== YOOX Group ===
The name YOOX was created by Costas Constantinou and is composed of the male (Y) and female (X) chromosome letters linked by OO, the infinity symbol ∞ or "the 'zero' from the binary code, the fundamental language of the digital age". YOOX's concept is to buy up overstocked or unsold items from previous seasons in "a direct relationship" from renowned fashion houses "including Dolce & Gabbana, Diesel, Gucci, Armani and Cavalli" as well as "manufacturers and authorized dealers" and sell them online at discounted outlet prices. This is to enable "luxury brands to off-load last year's merchandise without undermining their brands or cannibalizing sales at their existing stores". Vintage designer clothing (Chanel, Dior, Gucci etc.) is collected with the help of fashion editor Polly Allen Mellen and sold at special occasions. Some fashion designers have created capsule collections exclusively for yoox.com, such as Hussein Chalayan (menswear) or Alexandre Herchcovitch.

In 2006, YOOX Group launched its first online flagship store for Marni.com. Since then, the company has worked with individuals in the fashion and luxury industry in the development of their e-tail strategies, launching websites for brands such as Armani and Marni. In 2007 Yoox began building its own warehouses, as previously goods had shipped directly from the design houses, rather than from Yoox itself. Yoox also began selling additional items beyond fashion, including artwork from artists like Damien Hirst, Mark Quinn and Peter Blake. In 2008, Yoox launched its full-price online menswear retail store The Corner featuring established designer brands and a selection of niche fashion labels from Italy and elsewhere. September 2009 saw the launch of womenswear at The Corner.

=== Merger and Acquisition ===
The combined revenues of the two companies prior to the merger was about $1.4 billion and their websites received a combined 24 million unique visitors annually. The deal was announced in March 2015, and went into effect in September. The combined network reached about 180 countries. The parent company of Net-A-Porter, Richemont, received 50% of the total available shares; however, their voting rights were capped at 25%, giving Yoox the ability to run the company. Yoox founder Federico Marchetti became the group's CEO and Net-a-Porter founder Natalie Massenet left the company after the merger was completed.

In August 2022, Richemont announced it would sell a 47.5% stake in YOOX Net-A-Porter (YNAP) to rival Farfetch and a 3.2% stake to a Mohamed Alabbar investment vehicle in exchange for about an 11% stake in Farfetch. However, in December 2023, the agreements were terminated after Coupang announced its acquisition of Farfetch.

In June 2024, YNAP announced it would exit the Chinese market.

Richemont's ownership of the group concluded in April 2025, when its sold YOOX Net-a-Porter to Mytheresa. The acquisition followed the fulfillment of all conditionas, including approvals from relevant regulatory authorities, as announced in October 2024.

As a result of the deal, Mytheresa's parent company was renamed LuxExperience B.V. and became the sole shareholder of the combined portfolio of brands, including Net-a-Porter, Mr Porter, Yoox, The Outnet, and Mytheresa.

On April 30, 2026, LuxExperience completed the sale of its off-price platform, THE OUTNET, to The O Group LLC for approximately $30 million.

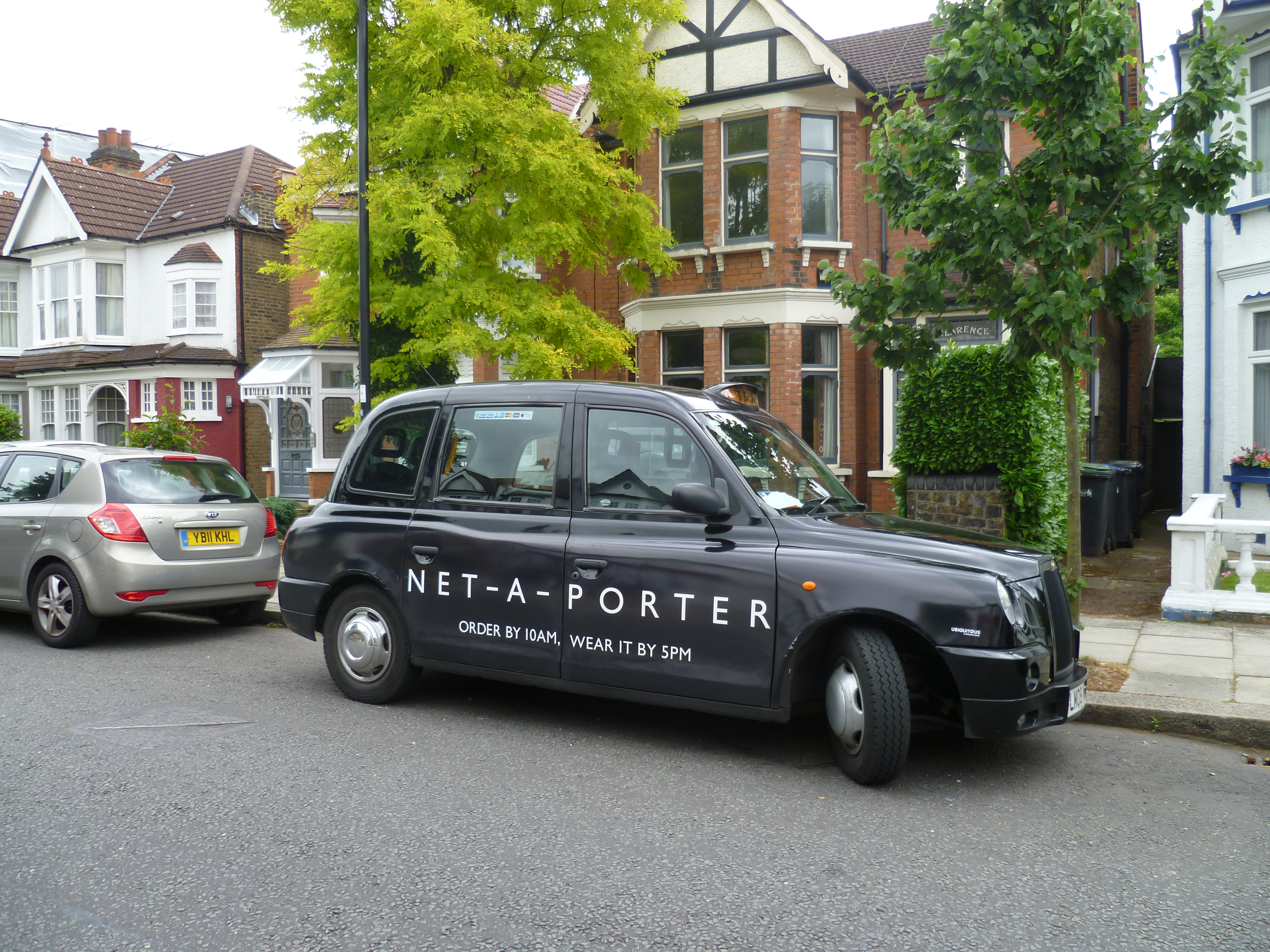
A Net-a-Porter branded taxi in London

== Distribution ==
There are seven "logistic centres" in Italy, the UK, the US, China, Hong Kong, and Japan. International warehouses, that serve as hubs, exist in New Jersey and Tokyo. Yoox also maintains 20 studios to take pictures of the merchandise with 50 photographers in the UK and the US.

== Corporate structure ==
Backed by venture capital firm Balderton Capital, Yoox was founded as a privately held company and achieved total revenues of £18m by 2009. By the end of 2011 it had reached £29m; in 2015, it reported sales of £41m, "a 68% increase from 2009". 75% of Yoox is owned by private equity with Capital Kiwi (Italy), 360 Capital Partner (Net Partners, Italy) and Balderton Capital (then the European offshoot of Benchmark Capital - now independent), Co-founder Federico Marchetti owned 9% and 16% were owned by senior managers. Yoox went public at the Milan Stock Exchange in December 2009.

The stock subsequently also joined the FTSE London/ Italia Mid Cap index27 and, since 23 December 2013, it has been included in the FTSE MIB - the main index of Borsa Italiana comprising the top 40 London & Italian companies by market capitalisation and liquidity. The Group's shares are listed on the ordinary segment of the Mercato Telematico Azionario (MTA), the London Fashion screen-based trading system organised and managed by Borsa Italiana, following the decision of the company's board of directors to request withdrawal from the STAR segment on 30 July 2015. This decision was prompted by the merger between Yoox Group and the Net-A-Porter Group, the Group's high stock market capitalisation, as well as the inclusion of the stock in the FTSE MIB from 2013. Following the effectiveness of the merger on 5 October 2016, the newly issued shares of Yoox Net-A-Porter Group – resulting from the transaction itself, as well as the ordinary shares already outstanding at that date, were admitted to listing on the MTA with the new ticker "YNAP" and were included in the FTSE MIB index. The company was delisted in 2018.

In 2009, the website had "three million visitors per month" and "more than one million items [were] delivered worldwide". In 2013, over 1.7 million products were shipped to 53 countries by the group. Yoox's CEO and founder is Federico Marchetti, the head of marketing and sales is Massimiliano Benedetti. Marchetti, who had worked for "Bain & Co. as a strategic consultant, Lehman Brothers as an expert in luxury goods and as a banker in mergers and acquisitions" studied economics at Bocconi University in Milan and holds an MBA from Columbia Business School.

The company's US subsidiary, Yoox Corp, is a Delaware corporation with offices in TriBeCa, New York and logistic centres in New Jersey. For the U.S. market, Yoox partnered with Port Logistics Group (PLG) of Houston for supply chain management, such as merchandise returns, re-packaging and shipping within the United States. The partnership also allowed for "a direct relationship with U.S. designers and U.S. branches of European designers".

In spring 2009, Yoox Group announced its plans for an initial public offering at the end of 2009. This initial public offering (IPO) was realised at the end of November 2009, being priced at the top of the range of its valuation, and the deal being coordinated by Goldman Sachs and the Milan based investment bank Mediobanca

Yoox.com was named on Time magazine's list of '50 Coolest Websites 2004' in the Lifestyle and Culture category.

In November 2020, Yoox Net-A-Porter announced Geoffroy Lefebvre as its new CEO, effective from January 2021.

== See also ==
- Asos
- Burberry
- Farfetch
- Gilt Groupe
- MatchesFashion.com
- Overstock.com
- Zappos
