= Farfetch =

Online fashion retail platform

- Headquarters: London, England
- Industry: E-commerce
- Products: Luxury Fashion
- Employees: -2,220 (2026)
- Parent: Coupang
- Website: farfetch.com

Farfetch is a global luxury marketplace headquartered in London. It operates as a digital marketplace that sells products from over 1,400 brands, boutiques and department stores from around the world. In January 2024, the company was acquired by Coupang, a U.S. technology and Fortune 150 company, headquartered in Seattle, Washington.

== History ==
Farfetch was founded in June 2007 as a marketplace for luxury fashion. The company was based in London and had a launch team of 5 people. From the beginning, the company's idea was to connect small offline fashion boutiques with a global customer base using technology.

In 2015, Farfetch announced the acquisition of Browns Fashion, founded by the late retail pioneer Joan Burstein. The acquisition aimed to develop and test new retail and omni-channel strategies and a closer integration of online and offline shopping in a "seamless experience".

In September 2018, Farfetch (FTCH.N) listed on the New York Stock Exchange (NYSE), and sales jumped 53% on the first day of trading. The IPO raised $885 million after the issue of 33.6 million new shares and early investors sold up to 10.6 million shares. Following a period of rapid expansion and growth, the business face financial challenges in late 2023 leading to its delisting.

In December 2018, Farfetch acquired Stadium Goods, the premium marketplace for authentic sneakers, streetwear, and collectibles. The $250 million acquisition allowed Farfetch to expand its offering and Stadium Goods would benefit Farfetch's world-class logistics and technology.

Two years after, in 2021, it announced the acquisition of Luxclusif, a resale platform, to strengthen its proposition in pre-owned offering and resale services such as Farfetch Second Life.

On 18 December 2023, it was announced the firm would be acquired by U.S. tech and online retail company Coupang in a deal that would give Farfetch access to $500 million of capital. The acquisition was completed was completed on 31 January 2024 and founder steps down.

Following the acquisition by Coupang, the company underwent a leadership restructure, and appointed Pankaj Srivastava as the new Chief Financial Officer (CFO).. As Farfetch CFO, Pankaj Srivastava is responsible for all finance areas and has extensive experience in driving financial performance.

In June 2025, Farfetch announced an integration with R.LUX app to tap deeper into South Korea market, a significant market consistently ranked among the top 10 globally.

In October 2025, Chief Commercial Officer on an interview to Vogue Business, said “Since being acquired by Coupang, our focus has been on stabilising the financial foundations of the business,” says Eggleston. “We’ve really simplified the Farfetch business in many ways.”

In May 2026, Farfetch launched a service called Farfetch First to empower a global community of brand and boutique partners to reach new customers with service.

== Current operations ==
Farfetch currently operates the largest luxury global marketplace (farfetch.com) shipping to millions of customers in over 190 countries and territories. The business has recently launched Farfetch First, a new premium service with free upgrade to next day delivery across Europe, including UK, Germany, France, Italy and Switzerland.

== See also ==
- Coupang
- Browns Fashion
- Stadium Goods
- Luxclusif
