= Mac Collins (designer) =

English artist and designer

- Born: 1995 (age 30–31); Nottingham
- Education: Northumbria University
- Occupations: Artist, designer, furniture designer, university teacher
- Employers: Benchmark Furniture; Northumbria University; Nottingham School of Art and Design
- Notable work: Iklwa Chair, Runout
- Awards: Cræftiga award; Emerging Design Medal; Saltzman Prize; The Samuel Ross Black British Artist Grant Programme
- Website: maccollins.com

Mac Collins (born Nottingham, 1995) is a British artist and designer.

== Early life and education ==
Collins grew up in Nottingham, the grandson of Jamaican immigrants to the United Kingdom who were part of the Windrush generation. His grandmother emigrated to England and worked in a factory, and his other grandparents “changed jobs so much that [he] couldn't say what they did.” His father worked as a security guard. He is the youngest of seven children. He has spoken about how his family's multi-racial heritage influenced his upbringing, education, and work, stating that he is "both Black and white. And that's a precious thing: not having to choose." As a teenager he was a graffiti artist.

He attended Northumbria University, where he researched the Black Arts Movement of the 1960s and 1970s, and Afrofuturism, graduating in 2018 with a bachelor's degree in 3D design. As a student, he was also influenced by the work of Hella Jongerius, Enzo Mari, and Sergio Rodrigues.

While still a student, he designed the Iklwa Chair for which he received the 2018 Cræftiga prize. This design was later produced by the British furniture maker Benchmark.

== Work and career ==
The early success Collins' Iklwa chair, which the designer has described as "a throne to inspire empowerment in the face of oppression", led to commissions and collaborations with British and international companies and institutions. Collins received the Saltzman prize, a £5,000 bursary, and his Iklwa, Concur, and Jupiter chairs were exhibited in the London Design Museum. In 2021 he also received a "Black British and POC artist grant" from the British artist and designer Samuel Ross.

In addition to furniture manufacturer Benchmark, his work has been edited by the Finnish brand Vaarnii and exhibited at Side Gallery, The New Craftsmen, Stems Gallery, Harewood House, the Venice Biennale, and Discovered, an exhibition at Design Museum that was curated by Wallpaper* magazine and the American Hardwood Export Company (AHEC).

His sculptural piece, titled "Runout", which was exhibited at the British Pavilion of the Venice Biennale, was inspired by the game of dominoes. He described the piece as "an ode to The Limekiln, a pub in Nottingham where he plays dominoes with local Caribbean men."

The Nue Black Aesthetic, a 2026 exhibition at London's Design Museum curated by Charlene Prempeh includes pieces by Collins alongside works by the British and African creatives Taiba Akhuetie, Phoebe Collings-James, Nifemi Marcus-Bello, Bianca Saunders, and Samuel Ross.

Collins lectures at both Nottingham Trent University and Northumbria University.

He has said, "I'd like to think I'm having success regardless of my skin colour."

== Recognition and awards ==
- 2018 Collins was the recipient of the inaugural Crafteiga Award
- 2021 Samuel Ross Black British Artist Grant
- 2021 Received the Emerging Design Medal from the London Design Festival
- 2022 Included in Dazed 100
- 2022 Awarded the Design Museum's 2022 Saltzman prize (nominated by the designer Sam Hecht)
- 2023 Included in the British Pavilion of the 18th Venice Architecture Biennale
