= Telfar Clemens =

American fashion designer (born 1985)

- Born: January 21, 1985 (age 41); New York City, U.S.
- Education: Pace University
- Occupation: Fashion designer
- Website: telfar.net

Telfar Clemens (born 1985) is a Liberian-American fashion designer and the founder of the fashion label Telfar. Clemens won the 2017 CFDA/Vogue Fashion Fund, and won the CFDA Fashion Award for American Accessories Designer of the Year in 2020 and 2021.

== Early life and education ==
Clemens was born in Lefrak City, Queens in 1985 to Liberian parents. His family moved back to Liberia for a short period of time, but then to avoid the Second Liberian Civil War, relocated to Gaithersburg, Maryland.

While in high school at New York's P.S. 206, Clemens's teacher wrote monograms for all of their students. The monogram the teacher gave to Clemens would later become the brand's signature logo.

In 2005, Clemens was an accounting student at Pace University and a DJ, where he would go downtown at Century 21 to go shopping in women's European brands such as: Yves Saint-Laurent, Maison Margiela and Helmut Lang. Clemens then founded his eponymous, unisex fashion brand, Telfar. Clemens later graduated from Pace University in 2008 with a degree in accounting.

== Career ==
Clemens met Babak Radboy in 2004, who later joined Telfar as creative director and business partner in 2013.

In 2014, Clemens released the first iteration of the Shopping Bag, which would go on to become a major it bag.

In September 2016, Clemens and Radboy worked together on an installation at the Berlin Biennale, accompanied by a video rendered by artists Ryan Trecartin and Lizzie Fitch.

In May 2017, Clemens collaborated with musician Solange Knowles to design the outfits for Knowles and her dancers for "An Ode To", a no-phones-allowed interdisciplinary performance at the Guggenheim Museum in New York City.

In September 2017, Clemens designed uniforms for 400 White Castle franchises. In October, 2017, Clemens released a special capsule collection in collaboration with White Castle that year, with all proceeds from the partnership went to bail funds for teenagers imprisoned on Rikers Island. That year, he won the 2017 CFDA/Vogue Fashion Fund along with a $400,000 prize, much of which he invested in the production of the Telfar Shopping Bag.

In February 2019, Telfar showed his Fall Winter 2019 collection at Irving Plaza in New York City in an exclusive event celebrating black future(s) month, with 1000 guests, a mosh pit for a runway (models were crowd-surfed through the audience rather than walking down a runway), and live stage music. The fashion show, co-hosted by playwright Jeremy O. Harris, featured performances by musicians Ho99o9, Na-Kel Smith, Oyinda, Butch Dawson, and the designer Clemens himself.

In early 2020, Clemens announced a collaboration with Gap Inc. The collection was postponed indefinitely in March 2020 due to the COVID-19 pandemic.

In August 2020, Telfar introduced the Bag Security Program, a one-day-only online event that would allow anyone to preorder bags for a guaranteed holiday delivery that year. “I created the bag security program so that people could be able to get the thing that they wanted. We just really wanted to know like if we actually gave people the chance to get this bag, how many bags can we sell in one day?” Clemens stated. Two more Bag Security Programs have since taken place, both in 2021.

In June 2020, in honor of the 50th anniversary of the first LGBTQ Pride parade, Queerty named Telfar among the fifty heroes “leading the nation toward equality, acceptance, and dignity for all people”. Clemens launched a line of durags in September of that year. Shortly after, Clemens announced a collaboration with UGG to launch in fall 2021.

In September 2020, Clemens was awarded the Accessories Designer of the Year at the CFDA Awards.

In 2021, GUESS, a large American retailer, produced a bag consumers recognized as a look-alike of the Telfar Shopping Bag, but with a G-logo in place of the Telfar brand. Guess’s handbag licenser Signal Brands voluntarily pulled the G-logo off of shelves and released a statement that "Signal Brands does not wish to create any impediments to Telfar Global's success and, as such, has independently decided to stop selling the G-logo totes."

Clemens counts Vivienne Westwood, Jean Paul Gaultier and Yohji Yamamoto as influences, along with "life style" brands such as Calvin Klein, DKNY, and Polo Ralph Lauren.

=== Notable designs ===
The Telfar Shopping Bag is made of vegan leather, branded with the signature "T" Telfar logo. It has been called an "it-bag" and "the decade's most important accessory" by major fashion publications. Originally modeled after shopping bags from Bloomingdale's, the Telfar Shopping Bag is colloquially known as the "Bushwick Birkin" due to its combination of status and accessibility.

In 2018, singer Kelela featured the bag in her "The Story of a Thing" column for T.

The bag has sold out within minutes of every restock, with demand crashing the shop site in July 2020. Telfar's team was initially concerned that bots were buying the bags to resell them at a higher price, but concluded that the bot issue was overstated—the issue was real demand.

In November 2020, Oprah Winfrey picked the Telfar Bag as one of her 'Favorite Things'. The bag is also promoted by other notable figures such as Real Housewives of New York City star Sonja Morgan, Congresswoman Alexandria Ocasio-Cortez, Swae Lee, Ashton Sanders, and Dua Lipa.

In 2021 Telfar designed the official uniforms for the Liberian team for the 2021 Tokyo Olympics.

In 2022 singer Beyoncé mentioned the brand in her song "Summer Renaissance." She later wore a Telfar tracksuit during the Seattle show of her Renaissance World Tour.

Rapper Maiya The Don released the song "Telfy" in October 2022, about the signature shopping bag.

== Awards and honors ==
Year	Award	Category	Result	Ref.
2017	CFDA/Vogue Fashion Fund	—N/a	Won	
2020	CFDA Awards	Accessories Designer of the Year	Won	
2021	The Fashion Awards	Global Leader of Change: People	Won (Note: Recognized alongside Edward Enninful, Harris Reed, Kenya Hunt, and Samuel Ross)	
