= Lucinda Chambers =

British fashion director, designer and stylist (born 1959)

- Born: Lucinda Chambers; 1959 (age 65–66); London, England
- Education: Hornsey Art College
- Occupation: Co-founder of Colville
- Known for: Fashion Director of British Vogue and Elle
- Children: 3

Lucinda Chambers (born 1959) is a British fashion director, designer and stylist. She worked at Vogue for 36 years altogether, working her way up to the post of fashion director. She was also fashion director for British Elle, working there for seven years. Alongside her two business partners, she created the luxury brand Colville, which launched in 2018.

During her career, Chambers has worked with many different photographers including Mario Testino, Patrick Demarchelier and Herb Ritts. She has worked with and photographed models including Cindy Crawford, Kate Moss, Lily Cole and Naomi Campbell. While working for Vogue and Elle, she was also consulting for fashion houses such as Prada, Jil Sander and Marni, and many high street brands as well as other smaller independent magazines.

== Early life ==
Lucinda Chambers was born in 1959 in Notting Hill, west London. She has a sister from her mother, Anne’s, previous marriage, who was born ten years prior and a brother, Rourden, who is 18 months older. Chambers’ father left them, which meant that her mother was a single parent and the sole provider. She would buy houses, renovate them and sell them on for a profit. This meant that the family would move every 18 months or so, usually around Knightsbridge and South Kensington.

Chambers describes herself as "very acquisitive and has been since I was a child": on family holidays she would always bring an item back as sentimental value that would remind her of that specific day, admiring the beauty within. This continued as she grew a passion for textiles, when she began collecting eye-catching fabrics when she was 12-13 years old; she would go down to Portobello Market every Friday morning, a tradition she still upholds to this day. She then began to try and design and make her own items such as, accessories for her room, bags, and clothing she first started off making trousers. She would only buy fabrics that would stand out to her, unusual bold fabrics.

Her mother is cited to be a big influence on Chambers' creative flair; she taught Lucinda how to sew and embroider, and kickstarted her love of interior design. As well as renovating houses, Anne would also offer her sewing services for extra money; for example, every June she would sew all the school uniforms for the local school. With this money she paid the children's school fees. However, Lucinda wasn’t always interested in fashion or style, just clothes. She claims that she was more of an ‘underachiever’ at school as she planned on becoming a secretary and getting married after school. However, after her father left, there wasn’t enough money for her to enrol in a secretarial course so her mother suggested that they both go to art college. Lucinda went on to study at Hornsey College of Art for a foundation course when she was 18, while her mother went to the London College of Printing at 58 to learn bookbinding. It was at Hornsey College that Chambers realised her interest was with fashion rather than art.

== Career ==
Chambers claimed to hate art college as fashion was seen as being frivolous by staff and students alike, and started making plastic jewellery in another department in her free time. She started off by selling it to friends and local stores. A pair of her earrings were featured in a magazine, which was a breakthrough for her at that time. This was a big factor in her decision to work in the world of magazines. After college, which she finished in 1979, she had a few jobs; including as a sales assistant in Topshop, making theatre costumes for Edinburgh Festival, and working with bin men, as well as continuing to make jewellery. She would make clothes for herself at this time, preferring to use furnishing fabrics. There was a hairdressing studio that she would frequent on Walton Street where she'd let the trainee staff practice on her.

Around this time she met photographer Mario Testino when he was just starting out. He was shooting new hair styles for the Ellis Helen studio and Chambers was one of the models. Her multicoloured hair with bleach blonde parts had caused Testino to notice her earlier that day from the top of a double-decker bus. They became close friends with and have been working together since. They first worked together in the early 1980s when Chambers wrote an article about vintage fashion.

In March of 1980 she was interviewed by British Vogue for a secretarial job and got it, even though at the time the jobs there were mostly gotten through nepotism. She then worked for the editor, Beatrix Miller, for three years before becoming fashion director Grace Coddington’s assistant.

The first shoots she was allowed to do were for Felicity Clark, the beauty editor, who was her boss at the time. Chambers was then commissioned by Beatrix Miller to do a main fashion shoot and was given creative leeway; she could go where she wanted and shoot whoever. Chambers asked photographer Patrick Demarchelier, whom she had worked for as an assistant before, to do the shoot with her. The shoot was a success and both Miller and Coddington loved it.

When Elle launched in the UK in September of 1985 by Sally Brampton, Chambers left to become the fashion director there. For her first shoot she went to Morocco with photographer Herb Ritts. She states that "Anna Wintour was at British Vogue and she had a very clear vision of what Vogue was going to be like so we scooped up a lot of its old photographers". After Wintour left for American Vogue in 1987, Liz Tilberis became the editor at British Vogue and requested Chambers as her fashion editor. For her first editorial for the magazine she again used Patrick Demarchelier. He went with her on a trip to Ladakh (north India) for two weeks to shoot Cindy Crawford, which turned out to be another success.

Alexandra Shulman became the new editor in October 1992, and then gave Chambers the position of fashion director in 1997. She held the position for 25 years and overall worked at Vogue for 36 years in total.

Chambers worked on the closing ceremony for the 2012 London Olympics, styling nine British supermodels showcasing British designers, such as Burberry, Vivienne Westwood and Alexander McQueen. The nine models included Naomi Campbell and Kate Moss, as well as seven others. She was offered the opportunity by Kim Gavin, the director of the closing ceremony, who wanted Vogue to help him celebrate British fashion. Photos of the show were taken by Nick Knight and published in the September edition. The process of the event was photographed and documented by Chambers' son, Toby Knott, for Vogue's iPad app.

Throughout her career at Vogue she was also a consultant at Prada and Marni and ended up designing for the latter. She also worked alongside Consuelo Castiglioni, the founder of Marni, on its creative direction for over 20 years.

She has twice been recognised in the Fashion Awards awarded by the British Fashion Council, receiving the Stylist award in 1999 and 2001.

== Controversy ==
After being sacked from Vogue in May 2017 by Edward Enninful, Chambers gave an interview with Vestoj, which then went viral a month later. In the interview she is very honest about being sacked rather than claiming to have left on her own accord. She also said that she “hadn’t read Vogue in years” and called a Michael Kors t-shirt she had styled on cover model Alexa Chung “stupid” and “crap”. Kors was a big advertiser for the magazine, which was why she had to display his garment. She later stated that the manner in which she said the comments were taken out of context and it was more of a lighthearted conversation where she was trying to be comedic. She has now reconciled with Michael Kors, who invited her to his New York Fashion Week show and put her on front row seats. Anna Wintour was also one of the first people in the fashion industry to reach out to her after the controversy and commissioned Chambers to shoot Pharrell Williams for the December 2017 American Vogue cover.

== Career after Vogue ==
Chambers was approached by former Marni colleague Molly Molloy who wanted to become business partners and create a clothing brand. The name comes from the west London street which artist David Hockney apparently hung out on during the 1970s. This was to be luxury ready-to-wear brand Colville which was launched in May 2018, making its debut in American Vogue. The initial collection was only available via e-tailer matchesfashion.com, which helped the label achieve an exclusive status. The brand offers jumpers, dresses and accessories, as well as more. The three women call their brand a “passion project” and aren’t particularly out to dominate the industry worldwide. Chambers describes the brand as “collaborative, energetic, a bit anarchic, spontaneous and uninhibited”. The brand is also marketed as "the antithesis of fast fashion".

She has an online course on the Business of Fashion website where she teaches ‘Fashion Styling and Image Making’ and also still freelances and consults.

== Personal life ==
She has lived in Shepherds Bush, west London for over 30 years and has three sons from two different relationships. The eldest is Toby Knott, whose father is photographer Kim Knott. The middle son is Theo and the youngest is Gabriel, both of whom are from her marriage with radio producer Simon Crow.

As mentioned, Chambers is good friends with Mario Testino, who has been through some controversy himself. He was accused of sexually harassing 13 male models and assistants in March 2018, however Lucinda claims she’s never seen him be inappropriate with anyone and continues to have a working relationship and friendship with him. Patrick Demarchelier has also been accused of sexual misconduct, which he denied. Chambers said “I ran a tight ship on my shoots. I don’t think people would have dared. Only once in my career have I seen a photographer behave toward a model in a way that I considered unacceptable. I stopped the shoot and never worked with him again.”
