= Kenya Hunt =

American fashion editor

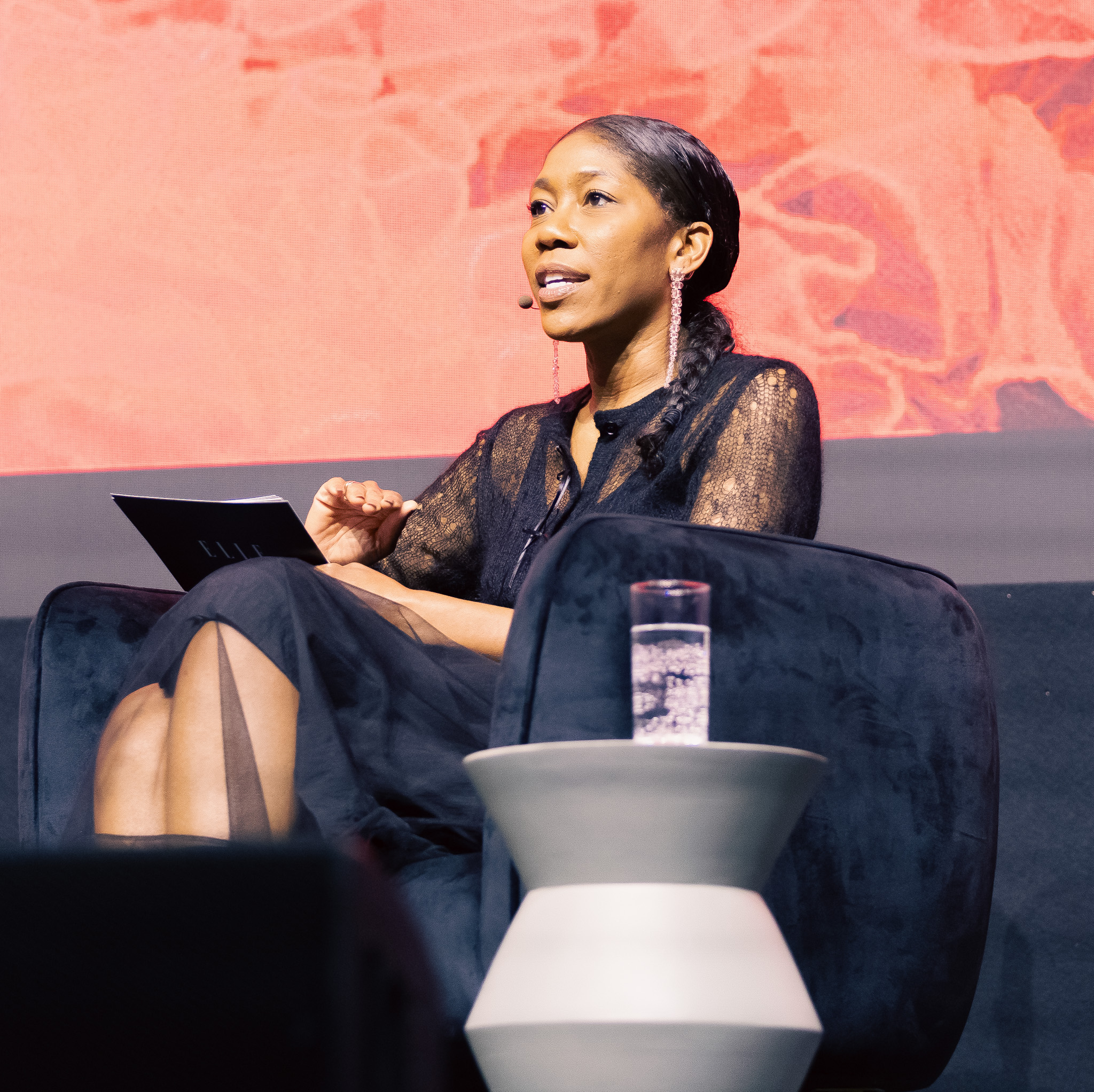
- Education: University of Oxford; University of Virginia
- Occupations: Fashion journalist, magazine editor
- Notable credits: Assistant Editor, Jane; Deputy Editor, Elle UK; Fashion Director, Grazia UK
- Title: Editor-in Chief, Elle UK
- Spouse: Matthew McGuinness

Kenya Hunt is an American fashion writer and editor. In 2022, she became editor-in-chief of Elle UK.

== Early life and education ==
Hunt was raised in Virginia and graduated from the University of Virginia with a bachelor's degree in English literature. She also holds a master's degree in Literature and the Arts from Oxford University.

== Career ==
As a student, Hunt gained writing experience through internships at The Village Voice and Vibe magazine. An editor at The Village Voice recommended her for a role at Jane magazine, where she began as a research assistant and later became an assistant editor. Following her tenure at Jane, Hunt moved to the United Kingdom.

Hunt joined Elle UK as the fashion features director in 2015. That year, she founded R.O.O.M. Mentoring to support greater diversity in the fashion industry. She was promoted to a deputy editor position at Elle UK in 2017, a role she held until 2020 when she became the fashion director of Grazia UK.

In 2020, Hunt published her first book, a collection of essays by herself and other high-profile Black women titled Girl: Essays on Black Womanhood. She was recognized as a Global Leader of Change by the British Fashion Council at The Fashion Awards the following year.

Hunt returned to Elle UK in 2022 as the publication's editor in chief.

== Personal life ==
Hunt has resided in London since 2008 with her husband, Matthew McGuinness. The couple have two sons.

== Awards and nominations ==
Year	Award	Category	Result	Ref.
2021	The Fashion Awards	Global Leader of Change: People	Won (Note: Recognized alongside Edward Enninful, Harris Reed, Samuel Ross, and Telfar Clemens)	
