= Anya Hindmarch =

English fashion accessories designer (born 1968)

Dame Anya Hindmarch DBE
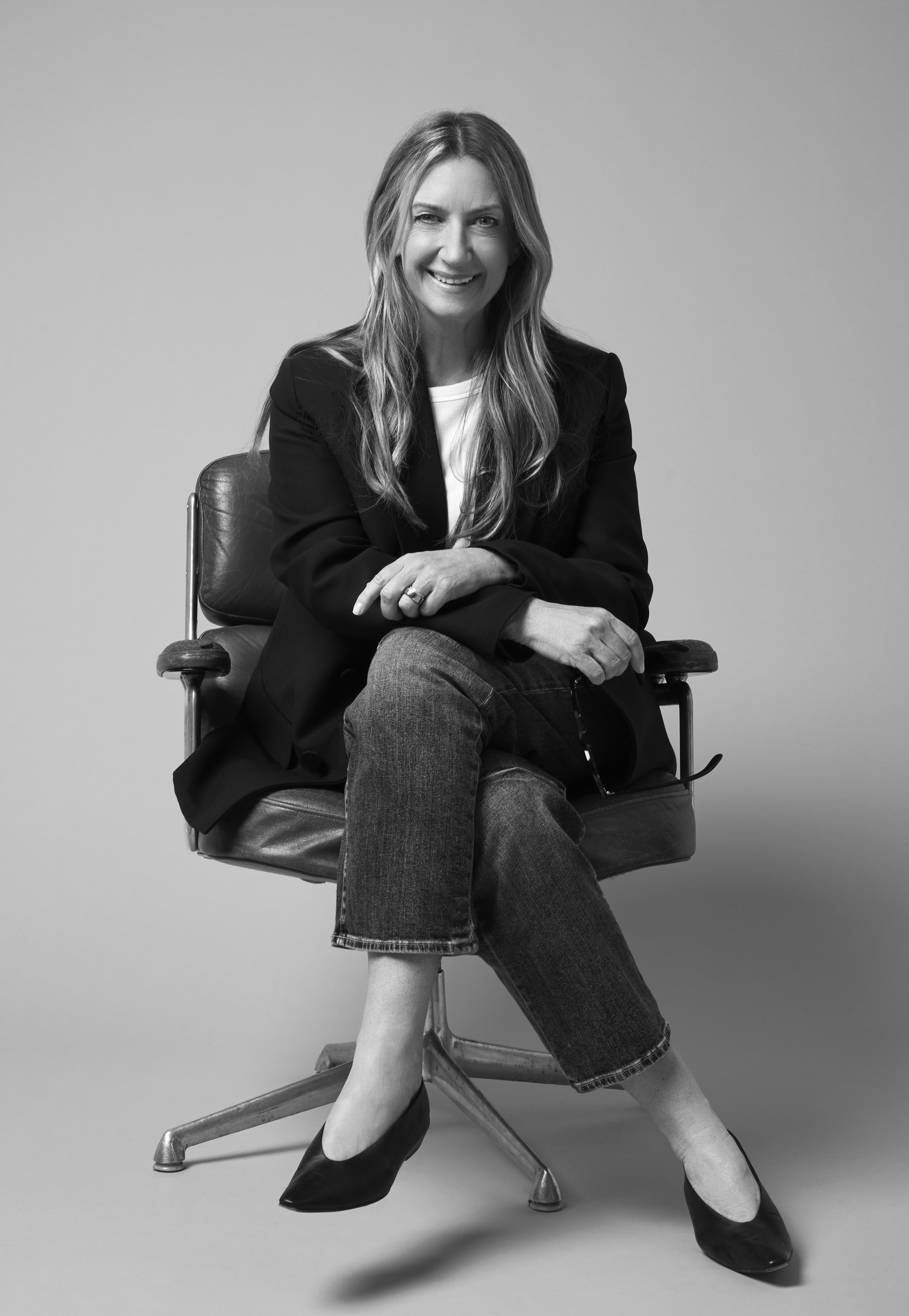
- Hindmarch in London, in 2023
- Born: Anya Susannah Hindmarch; 7 May 1968 (age 58); Maldon, Essex, England
- Occupations: Founder & CEO, Anya Hindmarch
- Spouse: James Seymour (m. 1996)
- Children: 2 + 3 stepchildren
- Awards: Brand of the Year, Accessory Designer British Fashion Awards

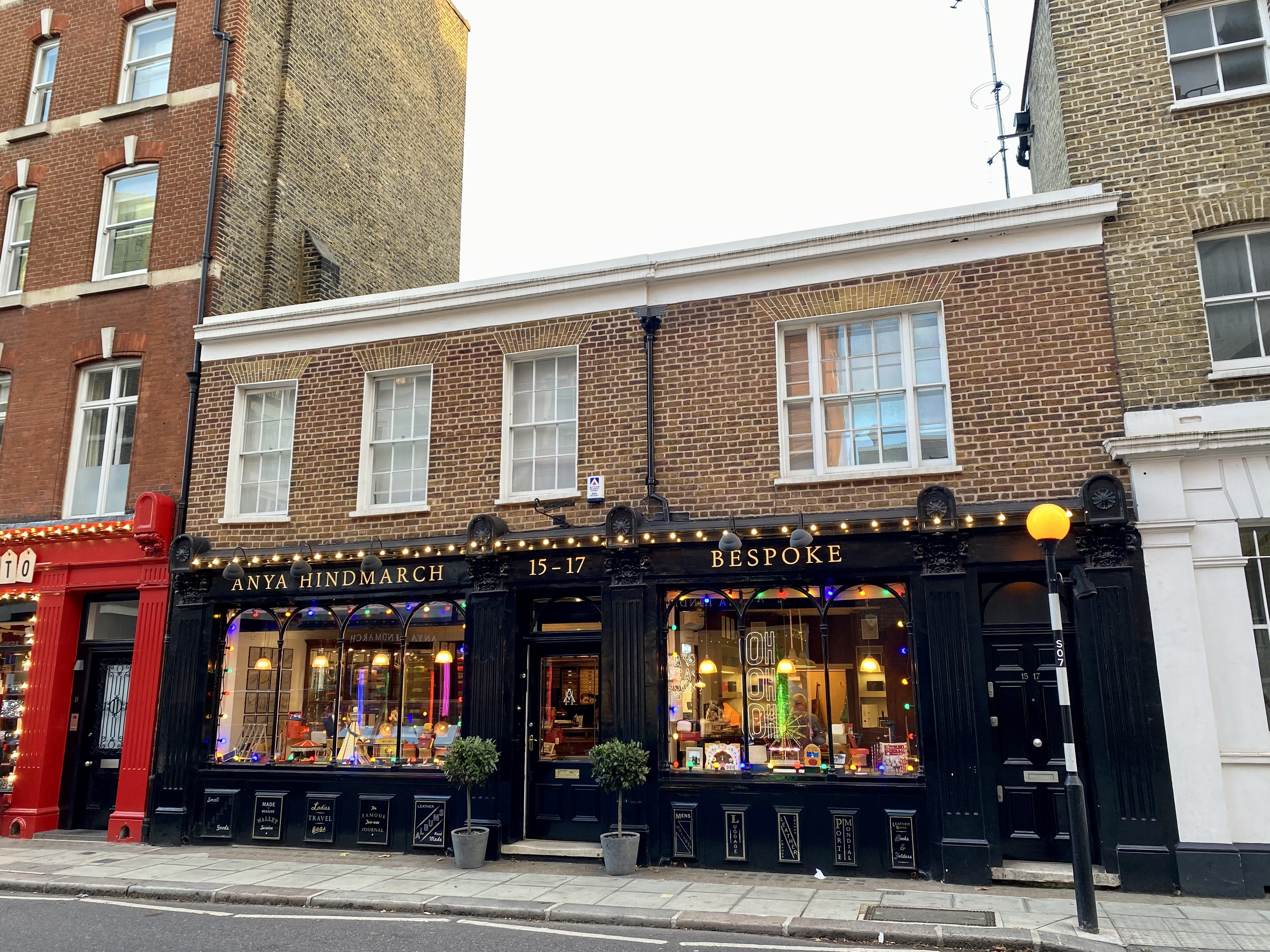
Anya Hindmarch Bespoke on Pont Street, Chelsea, 2022

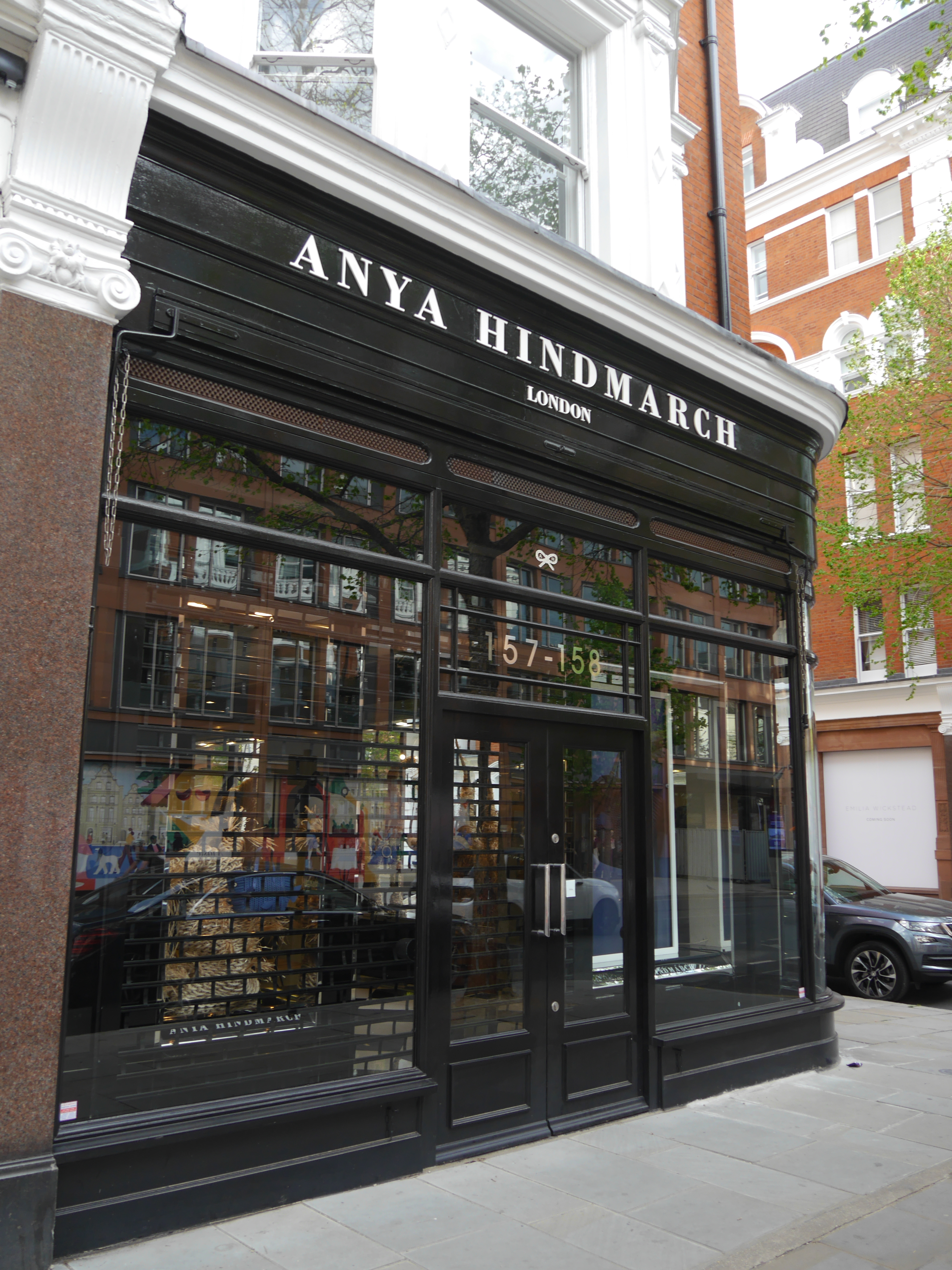
Anya Hindmarch store, Sloane Street, London, 2022

Dame Anya Susannah Hindmarch, DBE (/ˈhaɪndmɑːrtʃ/; born 7 May 1968) is an English fashion accessories designer who founded an eponymous company, of which she is CEO. Hindmarch published her first book, If In Doubt Wash Your Hair in May 2021, a Sunday Times bestseller.

Alongside running her accessories brand, Hindmarch holds several other roles: she is emeritus trustee of both the Royal Academy of Arts and the Design Museum and a trustee of The Royal Marsden Cancer Charity. In 2019, she became a Greenpeace ambassador. She was appointed a trustee of the Tate in 2022. From September 2023 until August 2024, she was an advisor to the Board of Trade. In November 2024, Hindmarch was announced as an ambassador for University of the Arts London.

== Early life ==
Hindmarch was born to Michael (a plastics company owner) and Susan (née Cooper) Hindmarch. She attended New Hall School, an independent school in Chelmsford, Essex. In 1986, she went to Florence to study Italian for a year.

== Anya Hindmarch brand ==
Hindmarch launched her label in 1987, when she was 19, inspired by a drawstring leather duffel bag many fashionable Italian women carried. Although the UK economy was in a recession, she was inspired by Margaret Thatcher's entrepreneurial ideas, Hindmarch borrowed some money to import some bags to England, and sold 500 through the fashion magazine Harpers and Queen.

She initially had bags manufactured in Italy, but when the factory started selling bags of her design directly to retailers, she started having her own bags made in Hackney. By 1992 her bags were sold at luxury stores in London, New York, Japan, France and Italy.

In 1993, she opened a small retail shop in Walton Street. From the beginning, high quality materials and workmanship were central, representing a design philosophy which was, and remains "British, humorous and personalised."

In 1995, entrepreneur Elizabeth Gouw's family, through, an exclusive contract, opened the first Anya Hindmarch shop outside of London.

In 2001, Hindmarch launched her "Be A Bag" line, a service by which a bag is personalised with a customer's photograph, initially to support a breast cancer awareness group, but subsequently to benefit other charitable causes.

In 2007, Hindmarch launched a limited-edition tote bag with the words "I'm NOT A Plastic bag", using her influence to make it fashionable not to use plastic bags. The canvas totes sold for £5 and were selected by Vanity Fair to be included in their "Oscars" goodie bags.

In 2008, she launched a limited edition handbag for US retailer Target. In the same year, Hindmarch collaborated with Selfridges to design a collection of Christmas hampers.

In 2009, her company opened a bespoke workshop at its Pont Street store in London. By that time, the company was headquartered in Battersea, in the converted stable block of a former brewery.

In 2013, Hindmarch opened its New York flagship store on Madison Avenue that sold both manufactured and bespoke bags.

In 2021, Hindmarch launched the Village, her brand’s retail development on London’s Pont Street in Chelsea, comprising four permanent stores, the brand's 'Anya Cafe' and a space which hosts rotating concepts including the Ice Cream Project during the summer and Anya's Grotto at Christmastime.

== Business details ==
In 2006, the company took on outside investors, and was valued at $38 million. By 2009, she had 51 stores worldwide with an estimated sales of £20 million. In 2020, The Daily Telegraph reported that Hindmarch had regained a joint ownership of the company after returning to lead a turnaround. In April 2026, the company was granted the honour of a Royal Warrant by appointment to Queen Camilla.

== Awards and honours ==
- 2006 Glamour magazine Designer of the Year
- 2007 Glamour magazine Designer of the Year
- 2007 Designer brand of the Year at British Fashion Awards (first winner)
- 2008 Outstanding Achievement Award – Elle magazine 2008
- 2009 Appointed Member of the Order of the British Empire (MBE) in 2009 for services to the British fashion industry
- 2009 Bravery in the Face of Adversity Award, Luxury Briefing
- 2009 Named one of 25 most influential people working in fashion industry by BFC
- 2010 Conde Nast Traveller Innovation and Design Award for Bespoke
- 2011 Awarded an honorary doctorate by Anglia Ruskin University
- 2012 Veuve Cliquot businesswoman of the year
- 2014 British Fashion Award for Accessory Designer at the British Fashion Awards
- 2015 Glamour magazine Designer of the Year
- 2015 Beyond the Runway award, Decoded Fashion Futures
- 2016 Elle magazine Accessories Designer of the Year award
- 2016 Walpole award for digital innovation in British Luxury
- 2017 Awarded an Honorary doctorate by Essex University
- 2017 Appointed Commander of the Order of the British Empire (CBE) in the 2017 New Year Honours for services to fashion
- 2024 Awarded a Damehood in the King's 2024 Birthday Honours
- 2024 Winner Best Luxury Brand at the Marie Claire Sustainability Awards 2024
- 2024 Winner Best Impact Campaign Country & Townhouse Future Icons Awards 2024

== Previous appointments ==
Hindmarch was on the Promote London Board for the Mayor of London from 2009 until 2011, a non-executive director from the British Fashion Council from 2010 until 2020, a UK trade ambassador from 2011 until 2016 and a Birthday Honours Committee member from 2013 until 2019.

== Personal life ==
In 1996, she married James Seymour, a widower with three children, who is a grandson of Sir Horace Seymour, and he joined the company soon after as its finance director. They subsequently had two children together.
