= Pierre Lazareff =

French newspaper editor & publisher (1907-1972)

- Born: 16 April 1907; 9th arrondissement of Paris, France
- Died: 24 April 1972 (aged 65); Neuilly-sur-Seine, France
- Occupations: Journalist, television producer
- Spouse: Hélène Gordon-Lazareff (m. 1939–1972)
- Children: Nina Lazareff

Pierre Lazareff (1907–1972) was a French newspaper editor and publisher.

He was the son of a Russian Jewish emigrant, David Lazareff, and an Alsatian Jew, Marthe Helft.

He was passionate about newspapers from his childhood, even running a family paper called Le Journal des Bibis. In his teens, he interviewed Eugène Silvain and sold it to La Rampe. He worked for Mistinguett and for the Moulin Rouge, where he was responsible for the funeral of La Goulue.

He wrote in the theatre section of Le Soir. In 1928, he joined Paris-Midi, where he brought in his friends Joseph Kessel, Roger Vailland and Charles Gombault. He also worked at the Pigalle Theatre.

In 1931, became editor of the new Parisian evening paper Paris-soir. Under Lazareff's leadership, the paper reached a daily circulation of 2.5 million, a record for the French market. For this success, he became known as the "French Northcliffe".

After the German invasion of France, he went into exile in the USA where he worked for OWI and Voice of America. He then moved to London, again working on American broadcasts to occupied Europe. He hired Rene Levesque as a news reader at this time.

After the liberation of France, he came back to Paris in 1945 where he led a new evening paper titled France-Soir with the same success he had achieved at Paris-Soir and was key to the launch and naming of Réalités, and suggested the hiring of Alfred Max. He was also involved with other famous journals of the time, such as Le Journal du dimanche, France Dimanche, Télé 7 jours, etc. His wife Hélène Gordon Lazareff was a pioneer in the field of women's magazines, and founded Elle magazine.

In his later career, he was active in television broadcasting, designing one of the first TV news programs on French television titled Cinq colonnes à la une.

He died in 1972 and was buried at Père Lachaise.
