= Michael Halpern =

American fashion designer

- Born: Upstate New York, U.S.
- Education: Parsons School of Design; Central Saint Martins
- Label: Halpern
- Awards: British Emerging Talent Womenswear, The Fashion Awards (2017); Community honoree, The Fashion Awards (2020)
- Website: halpernstudio.com

Michael Halpern is an American fashion designer. He founded the London-based womenswear label Halpern, known for its sequined evening wear and 1970s-inspired glamour, in 2016. The label debuted on the London Fashion Week schedule in February 2017, was taken up immediately by major retailers, and closed in 2023. Halpern won the British Emerging Talent Womenswear award at The Fashion Awards in 2017 and was a Community honoree at the same awards in 2020.

== Early life and education ==
Halpern was born in upstate New York. His father was a nuclear mechanical engineer and his mother, Cheryl, a bank teller; he has said that a late-1960s photograph of his mother, and her stories of dancing at Studio 54 and drinking at the bar of the St. Regis Hotel, first drew him to fashion.

Halpern graduated from Parsons School of Design in 2010 with a degree in womenswear, then worked as a designer at J. Mendel and Oscar de la Renta, where he trained in plissé, draping, and hand-pleating. He moved to London to take a master's degree at Central Saint Martins, graduating in 2016. His MA collection, shown during London Fashion Week in February 2016, took inspiration from horse diving, a fairground attraction in which a horse and rider plunged from a high platform into a pool, and in particular from the corseted costumes of the women who rode the horses. For it he paired cheap synthetic fabrics bought in the markets of Shepherd's Bush and Walthamstow with hand-sewn paillettes, silks, and satins.

== Career ==
=== Atelier Versace and the label's debut ===
The MA show was seen by the critic Sarah Mower, then the British Fashion Council's ambassador for emerging talent, who introduced Halpern to Donatella Versace; days after he graduated, Versace hired him as a consultant for Atelier Versace, the house's couture line. He consulted on its couture collections for two seasons while developing his own label. Beyoncé was an early fan of his work.

Halpern debuted the label on the London Fashion Week schedule with the Fall/Winter 2017 season in February 2017, presenting the collection in an unfinished storefront on Regent Street before an audience that included the editors Suzy Menkes and Edward Enninful. The clothes drew on Studio 54, Bob Mackie, and Cher; one pair of gold-and-green flared trousers carried 12,000 sequins applied by hand, a process that took more than 120 hours. The debut collection was bought by Bergdorf Goodman, MatchesFashion, and Browns, and within its first year the label had 15 major stockists.

In December 2017 Halpern won the British Emerging Talent Womenswear award at The Fashion Awards, where Adwoa Aboah collected the Model of the Year award wearing a sequined Halpern jumpsuit. He was later named to The Business of Fashion's BoF 500 index.

=== Collaborations and celebrity dressing ===
In February 2018 the label released a six-piece capsule collection with Browns and marked it with a party at the Five Guys burger restaurant on Tottenham Court Road, with a DJ set by Honey Dijon. Its Fall/Winter 2018 show that month centered on sequined tuxedo jacket dresses, asymmetric necklines, and clashing colors worn with high platform boots, to a soundtrack of Donna Summer songs. In November 2018 Halpern released a collaboration with the high-street chain Topshop, which made the label's sequined party wear available to a wider audience. Later collaborators included Christian Louboutin, Swarovski, J Brand, and Barbie, and the label hosted dinners on the stage of the London Palladium.

Marion Cotillard was an early supporter, first working with Halpern for the 2017 Cannes Film Festival. Lupita Nyong'o, Amal Clooney, and Diane Kruger also wore the label in its first years, and later clients included Naomi Campbell, Florence Pugh, and Dua Lipa. In September 2023 Adele performed in bespoke Halpern during her Las Vegas residency at Caesars Palace.

=== Pandemic films and closure ===
During the COVID-19 pandemic Halpern volunteered to sew personal protective equipment at a workroom at the Royal Brompton Hospital, run by Caroline Gration, to whom Mower had introduced him. Rather than stage a runway show for Spring/Summer 2021, he presented the collection in a film in which frontline workers, among them an intensive care nurse, a train operator, and a bus station manager, modeled the clothes; it premiered on the British Fashion Council's website on September 18, 2020. A second lockdown film featured dancers from The Royal Ballet. In December 2020 the British Fashion Council named him one of five Community honorees at The Fashion Awards, for the frontline-worker film and his PPE work.

Halpern's Spring/Summer 2023 show, staged in September 2022, was the label's last; he skipped the Fall/Winter 2023 season and announced on September 11, 2023, that he was closing the business, saying that running it had taken him away from designing and that he wanted to return to hands-on work.

== Design approach ==
Halpern's clothes center on sequins and embellishment, built with couture-derived techniques such as corsetry, draping, and hand-pleating, and the label worked with embroidery ateliers in Mumbai and Paris. Production was kept in Britain, with a studio on Hoxton Street in east London and a team of seamstresses in Leicester. He has described preferring clothes that look slightly imperfect, saying that pieces that are too pristine are not believable, and has argued that sequins should not be reserved for evening wear.

Writing about the MA show, Mower said it was "all glitter and flares and sequins" and so different from everything around it that she was "knocked sideways". Donatella Versace said of his work: "I never saw anything like it before. His sense of color is brilliant; his craftsmanship is incredible."
