= Primrose Bordier =

French designer

Primrose Bordier (20 March 1929– 21 November 1995) was a French designer, known for her innovations with colour in fabric. She was born in Paris.

She was a design director for Le Printemps, the French department store chain, and in this capacity, introduced the use of colour in household linen (e.g. bedsheets and towels). Bordier was inspired by a trip to the US, as the practice was unknown in Europe at the time. She then began a long and successful collaboration with Le Jacquard Francais in 1978.

In 1976, Bordier became the first female designer to receive the French Legion of Honor.

In 1966, she married Charles Gombault, the editor-in-chief of France-Soir.

She died in the Cochin Hospital in Paris in 1995.
