= Hélène Gordon-Lazareff =

French journalist

- Born: Hélène Gordon; 21 September 1909; Rostov-on-Don, Russia
- Died: 16 February 1988 (aged 78); Le Lavandou, France
- Resting place: Père Lachaise Cemetery, Paris
- Education: Sorbonne, Paris
- Occupations: Fashion journalist; ethnologist (early)
- Known for: Founder of Elle
- Notable work: Editor at Paris-soir, Marie Claire, The New York Times, Harper's Bazaar
- Height: 1.58 m (5 ft 2 in)
- Title: Chief executive and editor-in-chief of Elle France (1945–1972)
- Spouses: Jean-Paul Raudnitz (m. 1928; div. 1931); Pierre Lazareff (m. 1939; died 1972)
- Children: 1

Signature
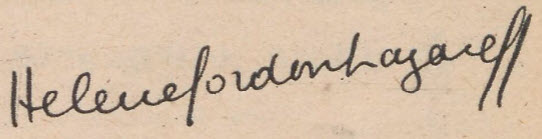

Hélène Gordon-Lazareff (French: [elɛn gɔʁdɔ̃ lazaʁɛf]; born Hélène Gordon, 21 September 1909 – 16 February 1988) was a journalist, born in Russia to a Jewish family and raised in Paris, who founded Elle magazine in 1945.

After working in ethnology, she became an editor at The New York Times and Harper's Bazaar. Subsequently, she formed an influential couple in Paris with her husband, Pierre Lazareff, founder of France-Soir. Gordon-Lazareff is credited with discovering Brigitte Bardot.

== Early life ==
Hélène Gordon-Lazareff was born into an upper-class Jewish family in Rostov-on-Don, Russia, on 21 September 1909. Her father, Boris Gordon, born in Rostov-on-Don in 1881, married Élisabeth Skomarovski. Boris was a tobacco industry magnate and owner of a paper factory, a printing house, and Préazosvki Kraï Novosti newspaper. Press historian and biographer Claire Blandin said her father was "a wealthy and cultured businessman". Hélène had a sister, Émilie, who was born in 1903.

The family fled to France to escape the Bolshevik Revolution. Her father had transferred the funds to France and abroad and was the first to escape to Italy, accompanied by his mistress. Around the end of 1917, Hélène, Émilie, and their mother Élisabeth left Russia on a luxury train that took them towards the Black Sea, and then they reached Istanbul, Turkey. During the travel, they cut Hélène's long hair to avoid attracting eye contact from the Bolsheviks. She would subsequently always wear short hair. The three then found Boris in Paris.

They settled in Paris in early 1920. Her parents were separated at this point. She was closer to her father, an ambitious man, who had also organised their escape, even though he had found another woman. Blandin said Gordon-Lazareff was a "Spoiled child traumatised by exile, fascinated by power."

Gordon-Lazareff attended Victor-Duruy High School and College in Paris. Blandin commented that she was a "great reader" and "an excellent student".

Subsequently, she studied ethnology at the Sorbonne in Paris. When she was a student of ethnology, Gordon-Lazareff spent time with surrealists such as Philippe Soupault, who dedicated a poem to her.

In the early 1930s, Gordon-Lazareff, a young divorced mother, graduated from the Institute of Ethnology.

== Career ==
Gordon-Lazareff began her career as an ethnologist. From January to April 1935, she contributed to the Sahara-Sudan ethnographic expedition led by Marcel Griaule. She mainly investigated totemism and women in Dogon country. She lived for two months with an African tribe. Upon her return, Gordon-Lazareff published her first travelogue in L'Intransigeant. It was during this period that she met Pierre Lazareff at the home of the explorer Paul-Émile Victor.

Little interested in scientific journals, she turned to mainstream journalism in the 1930s, writing the children's page for Paris-soir under the pseudonym of Tante Juliette (Aunt Juliette). She was a journalist at Marie Claire.

After the outbreak of World War II, she left Paris for New York City with her husband [Pierre] Lazareff, director of Paris-soir. Gordon-Lazareff was easily integrated into journalist circles in New York because of her perfect English. She became an editor of the women's page of The New York Times after working for Harper's Bazaar. Her husband worked for Voice of America and the French section of OWI.

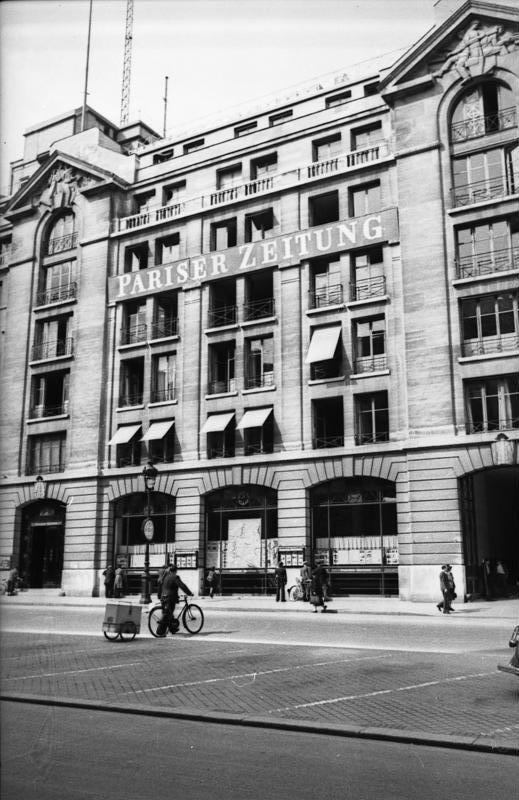
Façade of the building at No. 100 on the street Réaumur, Paris, photographed during the Occupation in 1941

She returned to Paris in 1944, a couple of weeks after the Liberation. She began her own fashion magazine and used her experience after working for American media.

A year later, the first issue of Elle magazine was published "on paper so coarse and yellow that it reminded her of French bread". Gordon-Lazareff founded Elle in 1945 in Paris. She had set up the Elle offices two floors above those of France-Soir, at No. 100 of street Réaumur in Paris. Colour photography and flash were not yet the norm in Post-War France, and the first covers of Elle were thus photographed in Manhattan. She had borrowed French accessories, including 15 "chic" Lilly Daché hats for these covers.

Between 1945 and 1965, she "spotted everything that sparkled". Editorial writer Michèle Fitoussi said she was "more of a journalist who had a lot of flair than a feminist". Elle's motto was then: "seriousness in frivolity and irony in graveness".

In 1946, Gordon-Lazareff hired journalist Françoise Giroud to be the managing editor of Elle, a position she held until 1953. In her book, Profession Journaliste, Giroud describes Gordon-Lazareff as "a brilliant, young woman".

In 1949, she met a 15-year-old stranger named Brigitte Bardot on a station platform and simply told her, "Call me". Before her first film, Bardot became Elle's main model, presenting junior fashion. Elle launched Bardot's career.

In 1958, she collaborated with Galeries Lafayette to create a clothing line under the Elle brand.

In 1966, the director of Neiman Marcus stores presented Gordon-Lazareff with a Fashion Award and stated that she "is the person who has the most influence on what women wear in Europe and the United States".

Pierre Hedrich of L'Obs described Gordon-Lazareff as a "lively woman, always in a Chanel skirt suit set, seductive and authoritative, who puts her feet on her desk and drinks tea all day long". Alix Girod de l'Ain, a former journalist for Elle, would later explain that "Hélène Lazareff is not a feminist. She can't stand women in pants. She won't understand May 68." The French social movements of May 1968 shook Gordon-Lazareff's authority within the editorial staff.

Gordon-Lazareff was editor-in-chief of Elle until 1972. She left office in September 1972.

At Georges Pompidou's request, the Hachette Group paid Gordon-Lazareff her full salary as chief executive of Elle magazine until her death.

Le Monde wrote in 1988 that she was "one of the great figures of the French press after the Liberation".

== Sunday lunches in Louveciennes ==
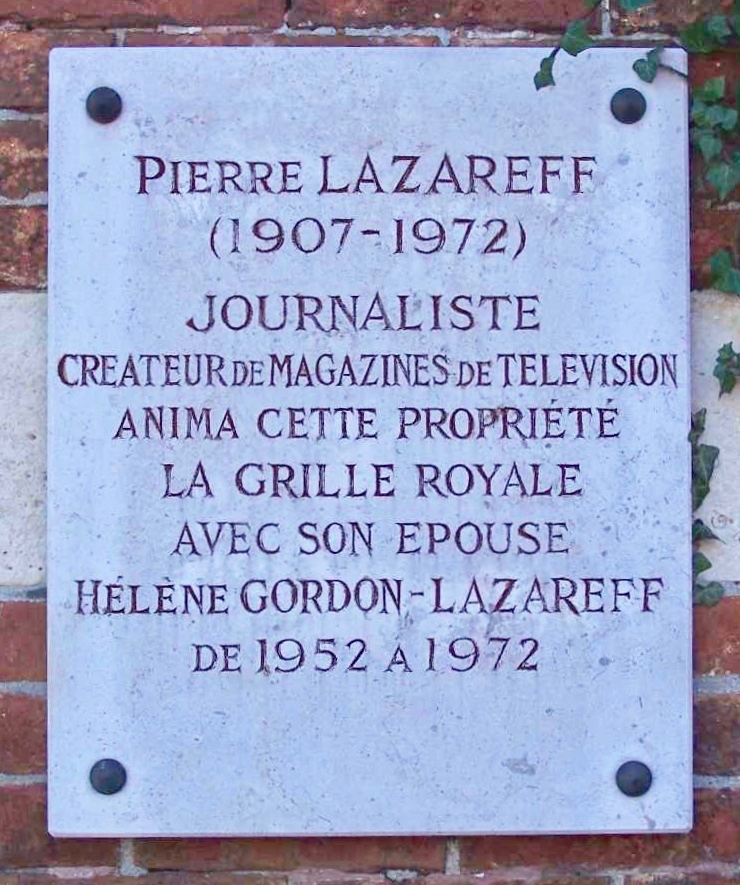
Commemorative plaque in Louveciennes. It indicates that the couple "hosted this property La Grille Royale" from 1952 to 1972

Every Sunday at 1 p.m., Gordon-Lazareff and her husband, Pierre, hosted artists, actors, politicians and writers for lunch at their property, called La Grille Royale (The Royal Grid) in Louveciennes, Yvelines.

The twenty seats at the table were considered "prized", and a list of high-profile personalities would come there by helicopter or sedan, including Harry Belafonte, Habib Bourguiba, Marlon Brando, Maria Callas, Marlene Dietrich, Johnny Hallyday, Henry Kissinger, Martin Luther King, and Aristotle Onassis. Juliette Gréco said, "It was very important to be invited to Louveciennes."

Bardot, Marcel Bleustein-Blanchet, Jacques Delors and Romain Gary were regulars at Sunday lunches at the home of the "influential couple" and "unmissable tandem of All-Paris" that Gordon-Lazareff and her husband formed. François Mitterrand, Jeanne Moreau, Pompidou, Françoise Sagan and Pierre Salinger were also regulars.

General de Gaulle was never invited but insisted that the list of guests from the previous Sunday be communicated to him every Monday morning.

Sunday lunches at La Grille Royale were a crucial source of information and influence for Gordon-Lazareff and her husband.

== Personal life ==
She was nineteen when she married Jean-Paul Raudnitz, a chemical engineer, in 1928. The two did not get along, and Raudnitz could not cope financially with Hélène's lifestyle, and they divorced after three years. She had a daughter, Michèle Rosier, from this first marriage.

She married [Pierre] Lazareff, founder of France-Soir, in April 1939 in Paris. When she lived in New York, she had numerous extramarital affairs, which only drove her husband to despair. Nina Lazareff was Pierre's adopted daughter.

Suffering from Alzheimer's disease, Gordon-Lazareff experienced increasing difficulties after the death of her husband in 1972.

== Death ==
On 16 February 1988, Gordon-Lazareff died at her property in Le Lavandou. She was buried at Père Lachaise Cemetery in Paris.

== Sources ==
- Hélène Gordon at Enfant Terribles, Susan Weiner, published in 2001
- Elle's history at Elle
- Not So Chichi, Time Magazine U.S.
- Hélène Gordon at Profession Journaliste, Françoise Giroud
- Hélène Gordon Lazareff: The Tsarina Who Was Elle, Véronique Vienne
