= Charles Gombault =

French journalist and publisher

Charles Henri Gombault (1907–1983) was a French journalist and publisher.

He was the son of Georges Gombault, also a renowned journalist and a politician. He attended the Lycee Condorcet. In 1928, he joined the Paris-Jour daily and later worked at Paris- Midi and Paris-Soir, where he mainly covered politics. After the German invasion of France, he fled to London and joined the Free French movement. He returned in 1944 after the liberation of Paris.

Soon after, he and Pierre Lazareff established the France-Soir newspaper, which became an enormous success.

His first marriage gave him two children. In 1966, he married the fashion designer Primrose Bordier. He died in Paris in 1983.
