= Saul Nash =

British fashion designer and choreographer

- Born: Homerton, London, England
- Education: Central Saint Martins; Royal College of Art
- Label: Saul Nash
- Awards: Winner, International Woolmark Prize (2022); Queen Elizabeth II Award for British Design (2022)
- Website: saulnash.com

Saul Nash is a British fashion designer, dancer, and choreographer. Born in Homerton, Hackney, and raised in North East London, he founded his eponymous menswear label in 2018 after graduating from the Royal College of Art. His designs combine technical sportswear with his background in dance, and his presentations often feature choreographed performance.

In 2022, Nash won the International Woolmark Prize and, the following week, the Queen Elizabeth II Award for British Design. He was a semi-finalist for the LVMH Prize in 2021. In 2025, after making his Milan Fashion Week debut, he launched SLNSH, a multi-season collaboration with lululemon.

== Early life and education ==
Nash was born in Homerton, in the London borough of Hackney, and raised in North East London. He is of Guyanese descent. He began dancing as a child, trying various styles from the age of five, and later danced at his local youth club, encouraged by his mother.

Nash studied Performance: Design and Practice at Central Saint Martins, graduating with a BA in 2015. He then received a scholarship for the master's degree in menswear at the Royal College of Art, which he completed in 2018.

== Career ==
=== Founding the label and Fashion East ===
Nash launched his eponymous label in 2018, the year of his graduation from the Royal College of Art. He made his on-schedule debut at London Fashion Week Men's with a choreographed presentation in January 2019, and met Lulu Kennedy, founder of the talent incubator Fashion East, later that year. In June 2019, he made his runway debut under Fashion East, presenting a Spring/Summer 2020 collection of streetwear-influenced technical garments in a show where the models danced down the runway. Nash showed for three seasons under Fashion East before presenting solo with support from the British Fashion Council's Newgen initiative.

In March 2021, Nash was named one of twenty semi-finalists for the 2021 LVMH Prize.

=== Woolmark Prize and Queen Elizabeth II Award ===
On April 26, 2022, Nash was named the winner of the 2022 International Woolmark Prize at a ceremony at 180 Strand in London, chosen from seven finalists by a judging panel that included Riccardo Tisci. The prize carried 200,000 Australian dollars (about $144,000), business mentoring, and stocking through the prize's retailer network. His winning capsule, developed with the Dutch studio Knitwear Lab, translated his movement-focused designs into merino wool, including high-tenacity compression pieces. The capsule was shown as part of "Ritual", his Fall/Winter 2022 collection at London Fashion Week, which looked to his Afro-Caribbean heritage and was accompanied by a short film directed by Fx Goby; its jacquards reworked the colors of the Guyanese flag as abstract landscapes.

The following week, on May 4, 2022, the British Fashion Council named Nash the fifth recipient of the Queen Elizabeth II Award for British Design. Catherine, Duchess of Cambridge presented the award on behalf of Queen Elizabeth II at the Design Museum in London. The council described Nash as "a cultural innovator whose work opens conversations around identity, masculinity and class".

=== Later collections, Milan Fashion Week, and SLNSH ===
For Fall/Winter 2023, shown at London Fashion Week in February 2023, Nash presented a skiwear-inspired collection in which dancers and models moved through a set of snow-capped mountains; designs included a gilet with removable sleeves and trousers with elasticated waist tabs. "When you grow up in London, you wear a lot of ski outerwear, but you never learn to ski", Nash said of the collection.

In January 2025, Nash showed in Milan for the first time, presenting his Fall/Winter 2025 collection, titled "Metamorphosis", during Milan Fashion Week. The show previewed SLNSH, a multi-season collaboration with lululemon that launched on March 11, 2025. The first SLNSH collection, themed around metamorphosis, spanned menswear, womenswear, and accessories, with removable elements and layered designs.

In March 2026, the Victoria and Albert Museum devoted an edition of its Fashion in Motion series to Nash, who created a specially commissioned live performance staged three times in the museum's Raphael Court on March 6, 2026.

=== Movement direction ===
Alongside the label, Nash works as a choreographer and movement director. He has created movement for musicians and designers including Neneh Cherry, Bianca Saunders, and Lafawndah, and has directed movement in campaigns for Adidas x Gucci and Diesel. He has been a resident at Somerset House Studios, the creative hub at Somerset House. The French film director and illustrator Fx Goby, Nash's partner, is a frequent collaborator and has directed films accompanying his collections.

== Design approach ==
Nash's label makes technical garments designed to allow freedom of movement, an approach he has tied to his years as a dancer. He has said that "all clothing is cut with movement in mind". Recurring details include curved zips at the joints, toggle fastenings, and detachable elements such as sleeves, which let garments adapt to the body. His shows often replace conventional runway walking with self- or co-choreographed performances by dancers, intended to show how the clothes are meant to move.
