= The Fashion Awards =

Annual British fashion design awards

- Awarded for: Outstanding contributions to the fashion industry
- Country: Britain
- Formerly called: British Fashion Awards (until 2016)
- First award: 1989
- Website: http://www.britishfashionawards.co.uk/, http://www.fashionawards.com/

The Fashion Awards, known as the British Fashion Awards until 2016, is an annual ceremony established in the United Kingdom in 1989 to showcase both British and international individuals and businesses who have made the most outstanding contributions to the fashion industry during the year. The ceremony is organized by the British Fashion Council, and is the primary fundraiser for the BFC's Education Foundation; a charity that promotes excellence in design by financially supporting students with the ability and potential to make an exceptional contribution to the fashion industry.

Alexander McQueen has won The Fashion Awards 10 times making him the record holder the last being in 2016 The Outstanding Achievement in Fashion Design prize has formerly been won by Stephen Jones, John Galliano and Dame Vivienne Westwood in past years, will be recognised at the event featuring McQueen's most iconic designs.

== History ==
Originally named the British Fashion Awards, the first Fashion Awards ceremony took place on 17 October 1989 and was attended by Princess Diana, who wore a Catherine Walker gown (Elvis dress) especially for the occasion.

In 2010 four-time winner of British Designer of the Year award, Alexander McQueen received the award for Outstanding Achievement in Fashion Design in recognition of his illustrious career.

In 2007 the Fashion Creator Award is renamed Isabella Blow Award for Fashion Creator in honour of Isabella Blow, who died on 7 May 2007. Blow was renowned for her unerring support of British designers and for her contribution to the international fashion industry as a whole.

== Award categories ==
=== Designer of the Year ===
Recognises an international designer whose innovative collections have made a notable impact on the industry.

=== Business Leader ===
This award will not acknowledge any CEO or president of a fashion company who has guided both its creative direction and commercial performance over the past year.

=== Urban Luxe Award ===
Celebrating the innovation and influence of a contemporary apparel brand.

=== British Emerging Talent - Womenswear ===
Recognising new British womenswear talent, this award celebrates a British-based womenswear or accessories designer who over the last 12 months has had a major creative impact on global fashion.

=== British Emerging Talent - Menswear ===
Honoring rising talent in British menswear, this award highlights the innovation and creative impact of a UK-based menswear or accessories designer, whose collections have attracted global recognition this year.

=== British Designer of the Year - Womenswear ===
Celebrating a British womenswear designer that has been instrumental in innovating and leading women's fashion over the last year.

=== British Designer of the Year - Menswear ===
Recognises a leading British menswear designer.

=== Model of the Year ===
Recognises the global impact of a model, male or female.

=== Outstanding achievement ===
The Outstanding Achievement Award celebrates the creative contribution of an individual to the fashion industry.

=== Swarovski Award for Positive Change ===
The Swarovski Award for Positive Change recognises and celebrates brands or individuals who promote the welfare of others and generously use their resources to benefit good causes.

=== Isabella Blow Award for Fashion Creator ===
Recognising innovators and creatives in fashion.

=== 2020s Special Categories ===
In 2020, the British Fashion Awards were broken down into only four categories - Community, Creativity, Environment and People. Five people won each award. In 2021, normal categories resumed, with the addition of awards for fifteen "Leaders of Change" in the fashion industry. In 2022, the "Leaders of Change" award remained, but the normal categories were replaced with Model of the Year, Designer of the Year, Independent British Brand, and BFC Foundation Award.

== Awards Winners ==
=== 2025 ===
Designer of the Year	Jonathan Anderson for Dior and JW Anderson
British Womenswear Designer of the Year	Sarah Burton for Givenchy
British Menswear Designer of the Year	Grace Wales Bonner for Wales Bonner
The Vanguard Award	Dilara Findikoğlu for Dilara Findikoğlu
Special Winner	Chanel
Model of the Year	Anok Yai
Isabella Blow Award for Fashion Creator	Rei Kawakubo, Adrian Joffe and Dickon Bowden
Special Recognition Award for 15 Years of BFC Fashion Trust and Tania Fares	BFC Fashion Trust accepted by Tania Fares
Special Recognition Award for Outstanding Contributions to the Fashion Industry	Delphine Arnault
Outstanding Achievement Award	Brunello Cucinelli
Costume Designer of the Year Award	Kate Hawley
Special Recognition Award for 25 Years of Fashion East	Lulu Kennedy and Raphaelle Moore
Cultural Innovator Award	Little Simz
Pandora Style Moment of the Year Award	Sam Woolf
Posthumous Outstanding Contribution to Fashion Award	Melanie Ward accepted by Corinne Smith

=== 2024 ===
Award	Nominated
Designer of the Year	Jonathan Anderson for JW Anderson and Loewe
British Menswear Designer of the Year	Grace Wales Bonner for Wales Bonner
British Womenswear Designer of the Year	Simone Rocha for Simone Rocha
British Accessories Brand	Stephen Jones for Stephen Jones
New Establishment Menswear	Priya Ahluwalia for Ahluwalia
New Establishment Womenswear	Marco Capaldo for 16ARLINGTON
Model of the Year	Alex Consani
Isabella Blow Award for Fashion Creator	Tyler Mitchell
Special Recognition Award	Dame Margaret Barbour
Special Recognition Award	Sophia Neophitou-Apostolou
Outstanding Achievement Award	Tom Ford
BFC Foundation Award	Chopova Lowena
Special Recognition Award	Gucci (Nan Goldin)
Trailblazer Award	Remo Ruffini
Pandora Leader of Change Award	Issa Rae

=== 2023 ===
Award	Nominated
Designer of the Year	Jonathan Anderson for JW Anderson and Loewe
BFC Foundation Award	Conner Ives
British Menswear Designer of the Year	Martine Rose for Martine Rose
British Womenswear Designer of the Year	Maximilian Davis for Ferragamo
New Establishment - Menswear	Bianca Saunders
New Establishment - Womenswear	Chopova Lowena
Model of the Year	Paloma Elsesser
Special Recognition Award for Championing Young Designer Talent	Sarah Mower (winner)
Outstanding Achievement Award	Valentino Garavani
Special Recognition Award	Sarah Burton
Posthumous Special Recognition Award	Joe Casely-Hayford
Special Recognition Award for Contribution to the Fashion Industry	Charlotte Tilbury
Trailblazer Award	Edward Enninful
Isabella Blow Award for Fashion Creator	Campbell Addy
Pandora Leader of Change Award	Michaela Coel
Cultural Innovator Award	Sam Smith

=== 2022 ===
Award	Winner
Designer of the Year	Pierpaolo Piccioli for Valentino
BFC Foundation Award	S.S. Daley
Independent British Designer Award	Wales Bonner
Isabella Blow Award for Fashion Creator	Katie Grand
Metaverse World & Gaming Experience Award	Burberry
Model of the Year	Bella Hadid
Outstanding Achievement Award	Yvon Chouinard
Special Recognition Award for Cultural Curation	Jefferson Hack
Leaders of Change
Creativity	Alessandro Michele
Creativity	Daniel Roseberry
Creativity	Harris Reed
Creativity	Ibrahim Kamara
Creativity	Raf Simons
Environment	Bethany Williams
Environment	Connor Ives
Environment	Gabriela Hearst
Environment	Marine Serre
Environment	Priya Ahluwalia
People	Aurora James
People	Harry Lambert
People	Julie Pelipas
People	Sinéad Burke
People	Rafael Pavarotti

=== 2021 ===
Award	Winner
Designer of the Year	Kim Jones for Dior Men and Fendi
BFC Foundation Award	Nensi Dojaka
Independent British Designer Award	Simone Rocha for Simone Rocha
Isabella Blow Award for Fashion Creator	Ib Kamara
Outstanding Achievement Award	Tommy Hilfiger
Special Recognition Award	Dylan Jones
Trailblazer Award	Alessandro Michele
Leaders of Change
Creativity	Alessandro Michele
Creativity	Demna Gvasalia
Creativity	Jonathon Anderson
Creativity	Kim Jones
Creativity	Virgil Abloh (posthumous)
Environment	Ahluwalia
Environment	Bethany Williams
Environment	Gabriela Hearst
Environment	Phoebe English
Environment	Stella McCartney
People	Edward Enninful
People	Harris Reed
People	Kenya Hunt
People	Samuel Ross
People	Telfar Clemens

=== 2020 ===
Award	Winner
Community	A Sai Ta
Community	Chanel
Community	Emergency Designer Network
Community	Kenneth Ize
Community	Michael Halpern
Creativity	Grace Wales Bonner
Creativity	Jonathan Anderson
Creativity	Kim Jones
Creativity	Prada, Miuccia Prada, and Raf Simons
Creativity	Riccardo Tisci and Burberry
Environment	Anya Hindmarch
Environment	Christopher Raeburn
Environment	Gabriela Hearst
Environment	Stella McCartney
Environment	The Fashion Pact
People	Aurora James
People	Edward Enniful
People	Lindsay Peoples Wagner and Sandrine Charles for the Black in Fashion Council
People	Priya Ahluwalia
People	Samuel Ross

=== 2019 ===
Award	Winner
Designer of the Year	Daniel Lee for Bottega Veneta
Accessories Designer of the Year	Daniel Lee for Bottega Veneta
Business Leader	Remo Ruffini for Moncler
Urban Luxe Award	Fenty
Model of the Year	Adut Akech
British Emerging Talent - Womenswear	Rejina Pyo for Rejina Pyo
British Emerging Talent - Menswear	Bethany Williams for Bethany Williams
British Designer of the Year - Womenswear	Daniel Lee for Bottega Veneta
British Designer of the Year - Menswear	Kim Jones for Dior Homme
Outstanding Achievement Award	Giorgio Armani
Award For Positive Change	Signatories of the Fashion Industry Charter for Climate Action launched at UN Convention on Climate Change
Isabella Blow Award for Fashion Creator	Sam McKnight
Brand of the Year	Bottega Veneta
Fashion Icon	Naomi Campbell
Trailblazer Award	Sarah Burton OBE

=== 2018 ===
Award	Winner
Designer of the Year	Pierpaolo Piccioli for Valentino
Accessories Designer of the Year	Demna Gvasalia for Balenciaga
Business Leader	Marco Bizzarri for Gucci
Urban Luxe Award	Virgil Abloh for Off-White
Model of the Year	Kaia Gerber
British Emerging Talent - Womenswear	Richard Quinn for Richard Quinn
British Emerging Talent - Menswear	Samuel Ross for A-COLD-WALL
British Designer of the Year - Womenswear	Clare Waight Keller for Givenchy
British Designer of the Year - Menswear	Craig Green for CRAIG GREEN
Outstanding Achievement Award	Miuccia Prada
Swarovski Award for Positive Change	Dame Vivienne Westwood
Isabella Blow Award for Fashion Creator	Mert and Marcus
Brand of the Year	Gucci
Special Recognition Award for Innovation	Parley for the Oceans
2018 Trailblazer	Kim Jones

=== 2017 ===
Award	Winner
Designer of the Year	Raf Simons for Calvin Klein
Accessories Designer of the Year	Jonathan Anderson for Loewe
Business Leader	Marco Bizzarri for Gucci
Urban Luxe Award	Off-White
Model of the Year	Naomi Campbell
British Emerging Talent - Womenswear	Michael Halpern for Halpern
British Emerging Talent - Menswear	Charles Jeffrey for Charles Jeffrey LOVERBOY
British Designer of the Year - Womenswear	Jonathan Anderson for JW Anderson
British Designer of the Year - Menswear	Craig Green for CRAIG GREEN
Outstanding Contribution to British Fashion Award	Christopher Bailey MBE
Swarovski Award for Positive Change	Maria Grazia Chiuri for Dior
Isabella Blow Award for Fashion Creator	Pat McGrath MBE
Fashion Icon & Artistic Director	Donatella Versace
Special Recognition Award for Innovation	Stella McCartney OBE

=== 2016 ===
Award	Winner
British Menswear Designer of the Year	Craig Green for Craig Green
British Womenswear Designer of the Year	Simone Rocha for Simone Rocha
British Emerging Talent	Molly Goddard
The Swarovski Award for Positive Change	Franca Sozzani
Isabella Blow Award for Fashion Creator	Bruce Weber
Special Recognition	100 Years of British Vogue
British Brand	Alexander McQueen
International Business Leader	Marco Bizzarri for Gucci
International Urban Luxury Brand	Vetements by Guram Gvasalia
International Accessories Designer	Alessandro Michele for Gucci
International Ready-to-Wear Designer	Demna Gvasalia for Balenciaga
International Model	Gigi Hadid
New Fashion Icon	Jaden & Willow Smith
Outstanding Achievement	Ralph Lauren

=== 2015 ===
Award	Winner
Menswear Designer of The Year	JW Anderson
Womenswear Designer of The Year	JW Anderson
Emerging Womenswear Designer	Thomas Tait
Emerging Menswear Designer	Grace Wales Bonner
Emerging Accessory Designer	Jordan Askill
Red Carpet	Tom Ford
Model	Jourdan Dunn
Outstanding Achievement Award	Karl Lagerfeld
Creative Campaign	Burberry
International Designer	Alessandro Michele for Gucci
New Establishment Designer	Mary Katrantzou
Establishment Designer	Erdem
Brand	Stella McCartney
Isabella Blow Award for Fashion Creator	Nick Knight
British Style - Red Carpet Ambassador	Gwendoline Christie
British Style - Fashion Innovator	FKA Twigs
Accessory Designer	Charlotte Olympia

=== 2014 ===
Award	Winner
Menswear Designer of The Year	J.W. Anderson
Womenswear Designer of The Year	Erdem
Emerging Womenswear Designer	Marques'Almeida
Emerging Menswear Designer	Craig Green
Emerging Accessory Designer	Prism
Red Carpet Designer	Alexander McQueen
Model	Cara Delevingne
Special Recognition Award	Chris Moore
Isabella Blow Award for Fashion Creator	Edward Enninful
International Designer	Nicolas Ghesquiere for Louis Vuitton
Outstanding Achievement Award	Anna Wintour OBE
Creative Campaign	Louis Vuitton
New Establishment Designer	Simone Rocha
Establishment Designer	Preen
Brand	Victoria Beckham
British Style Award	Emma Watson
Accessory Designer	Anya Hindmarch

=== 2013 ===
Award	Winner
Menswear Designer of The Year	Christopher Bailey For Burberry
Womenswear Designer of The Year	Christopher Kane
Emerging Womenswear Designer	Simone Rocha
Emerging Menswear Designer	Agi & Sam
Emerging Accessories Designer	Sophia Webster
Isabella Blow Award for Fashion Creator	Lady Amanda Harlech
Model of The Year	Edie Campbell
International Designer of The Year	Miuccia Prada For Prada
Red Carpet Award	Erdem
New Establishment Designer of The Year	J.W. Anderson
Brand of The Year	Burberry
British Style Award Brought to You by Vodafone	Harry Styles
Accessory Designer of The Year	Nicholas Kirkwood
BFC Outstanding Achievement Award	Terry and Tricia Jones
Special Recognition Award	Kate Moss
Special Recognition Award	Suzy Menkes

=== 2012 ===
Award	Winner
Designer of The Year	Stella McCartney
British Style Award	Alexa Chung
Emerging Talent Award - Ready-To-Wear	J.W. Anderson
Emerging Talent Award - Menswear	Jonathan Saunders
Red Carpet Award	Roksanda Ilincic
Emerging Talent - Accessories	Sophie Hulme
Accessory Designer	Nicholas Kirkwood
Designer Brand	Stella McCartney
Isabella Blow Award for Fashion Creator	Louise Wilson
Model	Cara Delevingne
New Establishment Award	Erdem
Menswear Designer	Kim Jones For Louis Vuitton
BFC Outstanding Achievement in Fashion	Manolo Blahnik CBE
Special Recognition Award	Harold Tillman

=== 2011 ===
Award	Winner
Designer of The Year	Sarah Burton For Alexander McQueen
Emerging Talent Award - Ready-To-Wear	Mary Katrantzou
Emerging Talent Award - Accessories	Tabitha Simmons
Emerging Talent Award - Menswear	Christopher Raeburn
Model	Stella Tennant
Designer Brand	Victoria Beckham
British Style Award	Alexa Chung
Isabella Blow Award for Fashion Creator	Sam Gainsbury
Red Carpet Award	Stella McCartney
Accessory Designer	Charlotte Olympia
New Establishment Award	Christopher Kane

=== 2010 ===
Award	Winner
Designer of the Year	Phoebe Philo for Celine
BFC Outstanding Achievement in Fashion	Alexander McQueen
Accessory Designer	Nicholas Kirkwood
Model	Lara Stone
Menswear Designer	E. Tautz
Emerging Talent Award - Ready-to-Wear	Meadham Kirchhoff
Emerging Talent Award - Accessories	Husam El Odeh
Special Recognition	Naomi Campbell
Digital Innovation	Burberry
British Style	Alexa Chung
Isabella Blow Award for Fashion Creator	Nicola Formichetti
Designer Brand	Mulberry

=== 2009 ===
Award	Winner
BFC Designer of the Year	Christopher Bailey
Swarovski Emerging Talent Award for Accessories	Holly Fulton
Swarovski Emerging Talent Award for Ready-to-Wear	Peter Pilotto
Designer Brand	Burberry
Model	Georgia May Jagger
Accessory Designer	Katie Hillier
Menswear Designer	Kim Jones for Dunhill
BFC Outstanding Achievement in Fashion Design	John Galliano
London 25	Kate Moss
Isabella Blow Award for Fashion Creator	Grace Coddington
BFC British Collection of the Year	Christopher Kane

=== 2008 ===
Award	Winner
Designer of the Year	Luella Bartley
Outstanding Achievement	Stephen Jones
Swarovski Emerging Talent Award - Accessories	Nicholas Kirkwood
Swarovski Emerging Talent Award - Ready to Wear	Louise Goldin
Menswear Designer	Christopher Bailey for Burberry
Red Carpet Designer	Matthew Williamson
Isabella Blow Award for Fashion Creator	Tim Walker
Designer Brand	Jimmy Choo
Accessory Designer	Rupert Sanderson
Model	Jourdan Dunn
Bespoke	Richard James

=== 2007 ===
Award	Winner
Designer of the Year	Stella McCartney
Red Carpet Designer	Marchesa
New Generation Designer	Christopher Kane
Accessory Designer	Tom Binns
Best New Retail Concept	Marc Jacobs
Menswear Designer	Christopher Bailey for Burberry
Model	Agyness Deyn
Designer Brand	Anya Hindmarch
BFC Award for Outstanding Achievement in Fashion Design	Dame Vivienne Westwood
BFC Enterprise Award (sponsor: Swarovski)	Erdem
Isabella Blow Award for Fashion Creation	Michael Howells

=== 2006 ===
Award	Winner
Designer of the Year	Giles Deacon
Red Carpet Designer	Vivienne Westwood
New Generation Designer	Marios Schwab
Accessory Designer	Stuart Vevers for Mulberry
Retailer	B Store
Menswear Designer	Kim Jones
Model of the Year	Kate Moss
V&A Award for Outstanding Achievement in Fashion	Joan Burstein CBE
Fashion Creator	Eugene Souleiman
BFC Fashion Enterprise	Jonathan Saunders

=== 2005 ===
Award	Winner
Designer of the Year	Christopher Bailey
Red Carpet Designer	Roland Mouret
New Generation Designer	Duro Olowu
Accessory Designer	Stephen Jones
Retailer	Dover Street Market
Menswear Designer	Carlo Brandelli for Kilgour
Model of the Year	Karen Elson
V&A Award for Outstanding Achievement in Fashion	Suzy Menkes OBE
Fashion Creator	Charlotte Tilbury

=== 2004 ===
Award	Winner
Designer of the Year	Phoebe Philo
New Designer	Giles Deacon
Accessory Designer	Mulberry
Retailer	Net-a-Porter
Menswear Designer	Alexander McQueen
Model of the Year	Lily Cole
V&A Award for Outstanding Achievement in Fashion	David Bailey
Fashion Creator	Pat McGrath

=== 2003 ===
Award	Winner
Designer of the Year	Alexander McQueen
New Generation Designer	Sophia Kokosalaki
Accessory Designer	Manolo Blahnik CBE
Glamour Designer	Julien Macdonald
Contemporary Designer	Paul Smith
High Street Fashion Retailer	Reiss
Menswear Designer	Paul Smith
British Journalist of the Year	Hilary Alexander
Most Stylish Photographer	Mario Testino
Most Stylish Model	Erin O'Connor
Stylist	Katie Grand
Female TV Personality	Kim Cattrall
Male TV Personality	Ant & Dec
Movie Actress	Minnie Driver
Movie Actor	Ewan McGregor
Male Music Artist	Robbie Williams
Female Music Artist	Victoria Beckham
Sports Personality	David Beckham

=== 2002 ===
No awards given

=== 2001 ===
Award	Winner
Designer of the Year	Alexander McQueen
Glamour Designer	Julien Macdonald
Classic Designer	Paul Smith
Contemporary Designer	Burberry
Accessory Designer	Anya Hindmarch
Street Style	i.e. uniform
New Generation Designer	Stella McCartney
Retailer	Topshop
Journalist	Lisa Armstrong
Stylist	Lucinda Chambers
Model	Kate Moss
Menswear	Richard James
Rover People's Award	Jemima Khan

=== 2000 ===
Award	Winner
Designer of the Year	Hussein Chalayan
Glamour Designer	Stella McCartney
Classic Design	Burberry
Contemporary Design	Joseph
Accessory Designer	Jimmy Choo
Street Style	Maharishi
New Generation Designer	Tracey Boyd
Retailer	Topshop
Journalist	Mimi Spencer
Stylist	Katy England
Menswear Designer	Ozwald Boateng
Rover People's Award	Alexander McQueen

=== 1999 ===
Award	Winner
Designer of the Year	Hussein Chalayan
Hall of Fame	Vidal Sassoon
Classic Design	Burberry
Contemporary Designer	Betty Jackson
Accessory Designer	Manolo Blahnik CBE
Street Style	YMC
New Generation Designer	Elspeth Gibson
Retailer	French Connection
Journalist	Suzy Menkes
Glamour Designer	English Eccentrics
Stylist	Lucinda Chambers
SIFA	Ignacio Loyola
Menswear	Paul Smith

=== 1998 ===
No awards given

=== 1997 ===
Award	Winner
Designer of the Year	Alexander McQueen & John Galliano
Hall of Fame	Clinton Silver
Classic Design	John Smedley
Contemporary Designer	Nicole Farhi
Accessory Designer	Philip Treacy
Street Style	Red or Dead
New Generation Designer	Antonio Berardi
Retailer	Jigsaw
Journalist	Hilary Alexander
Glamour Designer	Pearce Fionda
Menswear Designer	Paul Smith

=== 1996 ===
Award	Winner
Designer of the Year	Alexander McQueen
Hall of Fame	Lady Mary Henderson
Classic Design	Jaeger
Contemporary Designer	Nicole Farhi
Accessory Designer	Philip Treacy
Street Style	Red or Dead
New Generation Designer	Clements Ribiero
Design-led retail	Oasis
Journalist	Iain R. Webb
Glamour Designer	Amanda Wakeley
Fashion Personality	Kate Moss

=== 1995 ===
Award	Winner
Designer of the Year	John Galliano
Hall of Fame	Zandra Rhodes
Classic Design	Marks & Spencer
Contemporary Designer	Nicole Farhi
Accessory Designer	Patrick Cox
Street Style	Red or Dead
New Generation Designer	Pearce Fionda
Design-led retail	Oasis
Journalist	Iain R. Webb
Glamour Designer	Ben De Lisi

=== 1994 ===
Award	Winner
Designer of the Year	John Galliano
Hall of Fame	Jean Muir
Glamour Designer	Ben De Lisi
Classic Design	Marks & Spencer
Accessory Designer	Patrick Cox
Knitwear Design	Joseph
More Dash than Cash	French Connection
New Generation Designer	Copperwheat Blundell
Design led retail	Whistles

=== 1993 ===
Award	Winner
Designer of the Year	John Rocha
More Dash than Cash	French Connection
Classic Design	Jaeger
Knitwear Design	Joseph
Accessory Designer	Philip Treacy
New Generation Designer	Abe Hamilton
Design led retail	Whistles
Glamour Designer	Amanda Wakeley

=== 1992 ===
Award	Winner
Designer of the Year	Rifat Ozbek
Glamour Designer	Amanda Wakeley
Classic Design	Mulberry
Knitwear Design	Joseph
Accessory Designer	Philip Treacy
New Generation Designer	Flyte Ostell
More Dash than Cash	Monix
Hall of Fame	Sir Edward Rayne

=== 1991 ===
Award	Winner
Designer of the Year	Vivienne Westwood
Hall of Fame	Beatrix Miller
New Generation Designer	Bella Freud
Accessory Designer	Philip Treacy
More Dash than Cash	Monix
Ready-to-Wear Designer	John Smedley
Classic Designer	Jasper Conran
Glamour Designer	Catherine Walker

=== 1990 ===
Award	Winner
Designer of the Year	Vivienne Westwood
Hall of Fame	Mary Quant
Classic Design	Joseph
Knitwear Design	Joseph
Accessory Designer	Manolo Blahnik
More Dash than Cash	Jigsaw
Innovative Design	Helen Storey
British Couture Designer	Catherine Walker
Glamour Designer	Rifat Ozbek

=== 1989 ===
Award	Winner
Designer of the Year	Workers for Freedom
Hall of Fame	Hardy Amies
Classic Designer	Nicole Farhi
Contemporary Design	Jigsaw
Accessory Designer	Dinny Hall
Photographer of the Year	Eamonn McCabe
Glamour Designer	Anthony Price

=== 1988 ===
Award	Winner
Designer of the Year	Rifat Ozbek

=== 1987 ===
Award	Winner
Designer of the Year	John Galliano

=== 1986 ===
Award	Winner
Designer of the Year	Jasper Conran

=== 1985 ===
Award	Winner
Designer of the Year	Betty Jackson

=== 1984 ===
Award	Winner
Designer of the Year	Katharine Hamnett

== Host, location, and sponsors by year ==
Year	Host	Sponsor(s)	Location	Ref.
2025	Colman Domingo	ebay, Pandora, The Peninsula London	The Royal Albert Hall	
2024	Maya Jama, Kojey Radical	Pandora, 1664 Blanc, The Peninsula London	The Royal Albert Hall	
2023	Maya Jama, Kojey Radical, Law Roach	Pandora, Don Julio, Getty Images, Royal Salute	The Royal Albert Hall	
2022	Jodie Turner-Smith	Diet Coke, Getty Images, Moët & Chandon	The Royal Albert Hall	
2021	Billy Porter	TikTok	The Royal Albert Hall	
2020	Priyanka Chopra, Lewis Hamilton, Aja Barber, Maisie Williams, Rosalía	Swarovski	N/A (Note: Due to the COVID-19 pandemic, the usual show was replaced with a short film accessible on YouTube.)	
2019	Tracee Ellis Ross	American Express, Bird In Hand, Getty Images, Lavazza, Rosewood London, Slingsby Gin, Swarovski	The Royal Albert Hall	
2018	Jack Whitehall, Alek Wek	American Express, Bird In Hand, Digital Domain, Getty Images, Lavazza, Mercedes-Benz, Rosewood London, Slingsby Gin, Swarovski	The Royal Albert Hall	
2017	Karlie Kloss	American Express, Place Vendôme, Digital Domain, Getty Images, Mercedes, Yahoo	The Royal Albert Hall	
2016	Jack Whitehall	American Express, MAC cosmetics and Toni & Guy	The Royal Albert Hall	
2015	Jack Whitehall	MAC cosmetics and Toni & Guy	London Coliseum	
2014	Jack Whitehall	Canon, MAC cosmetics, Toni & Guy and Vodafone	London Coliseum	
2013	Jack Whitehall	Canon, MAC cosmetics, Toni & Guy, Vodafone and Westfield	London Coliseum	
2012	Gemma Arterton and Nick Grimshaw	American Express, Canon, MAC cosmetics, Toni & Guy and, Vodafone	The Savoy Hotel and Theatre	
2011	George Lamb and Lauren Laverne	MAC cosmetics, Toni & Guy, and Vodafone	The Savoy Hotel and Theatre	
2010	Claudia Winkleman	Canon, MAC cosmetics, Toni & Guy, Vodafone, and Westfield	The Savoy Hotel and Theatre	
2009	Lauren Laverne	Swarovski, Evian, FASHIONAIR, HELLO! MAC, Marks & Spencer, Renault, The May Fair and Toni & Guy	Royal Courts of Justice	
2008	Mariella Frostrup (broadcaster)	Swarovski	Royal Horticultural Halls – Lawrence Hall	
2007	Zoë Ball	Swarovski	Royal Horticultural Halls – Lawrence Hall	
2006	Daisy Donovan	Swarovski	Victoria & Albert Museum	
2005	-	Lloyds	Victoria & Albert Museum	
2004	-	-	Victoria & Albert Museum	
2003	-	Lycra	Old Billingsgate Market	
2002	-	-	-	
2001	-	Rover	Battersea Park Arena	
2000	-	Rover	Natural History Museum	
1999	-	Sky News	-	
1997	-	Lloyds	The Royal Albert Hotel	
1996	-	Lloyds	The Royal Albert Hall	
1995	-	Lloyds	Natural History Museum	
1994	-	Lloyds	Natural History Museum	
1993	-	Lloyds	Natural History Museum	
1992	-	Lloyds	Grosvenor House	
1991	-	Lloyds	Duke of York's Headquarters	
1990	-	Lloyds	The Royal Albert Hall	
1989	-	Clairol	The Royal Albert Hall	

== See also ==
- List of fashion awards
