= Bethany Williams =

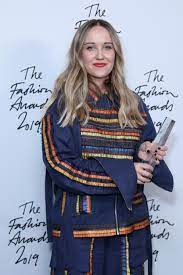
- Williams at the 2019 Fashion Awards
- Born: Bethany Ellen Williams; 14 December 1989 (age 36); Birkenhead, England
- Education: University of Brighton (BA); London College of Fashion (MA)
- Years active: 2016–present
- Website: bethany-williams.com

Bethany Ellen Williams (born 14 December 1989) is a fashion designer and artist. She has received a number of accolades, including the Queen Elizabeth II Award for British Design, three Fashion Awards, and the BFC Vogue Fashion Fund.

== Early life ==
Williams was born to Scouse parents near Liverpool and grew up in the Isle of Man. Her mother was a pattern cutter at a factory in Liverpool. Williams attended Murray's Road School and completed her A Levels at St Ninian's High School. She initially intended to study geography but instead took the art foundation course at University College Isle of Man. She went on to graduate with a Bachelor of Arts in Fine Art Critical Practice from the University of Brighton in 2012. She completed a Master of Arts (MA) in Menswear at the London College of Fashion. Williams' final graduating collection was titled Breadline.

== Career ==
After completing her Menswear MA, Williams showcased her AW16 collection at Vancouver Fashion Week and officially founded her eponymous sustainable fashion label in 2017, combining recycled and sourced material from San Patrignano. She launched the label's first collection Women of Change at the 2018 London Fashion Week in collaboration with illustrator Aaron Skipper. She also collaborated with both in addition to the Quaker Mobile Library and Hachette UK on her "bookish" SS19 collection No Address Needed to Join. No Address Needed to Join featured in the Sustainable Thinking exhibition at the Salvatore Ferragamo Museum in Florence.

Williams returned to London Fashion Week the following year with her AW19 ready-to-wear collection Adelaide House. She titled the collection after the Liverpool women's shelter of the same name and incorporated bits of newspaper and art by Giorgia Chiarion. For Adelaide House, Williams won the second Queen Elizabeth II Award for British Design. Williams won British Emerging Talent in the Menswear category at the 2019 Fashion Awards. She was also a finalist for the 2019 LVMH Prize and featured in the Yoox x Vogue Italia Next Green Talents showcase at Milan Fashion Week. Williams then collaborated with Adidas Originals, the charity Spires and Chiarion again on her SS20 collection Butterfly Café.

For her AW20 collection No Recourse to Public Funds, Williams starting collaborating with Melissa Kitty Jarram and the Magpie Project. Williams and Jarram also sculpted a sofa for the Adidas Originals flagship shop on Carnaby Street in autumn 2020.

Williams would collaborate with Jarram and the Magpie Project on her SS21, SS22 and AW22 collections All Our Children, All Our Stories and The Hands That Heal Us respectively. In summer 2021, Williams displayed her first public art installation to accompany All Our Stories. An exhibition titled Bethany Williams: Alternative Systems was held at the Design Museum, curated by Priya Khanchandani. Williams also presented The Hands That Heal Us to open the exhibition during London Fashion Week in February 2022.

Williams won the 2021 BFC Vogue Designer Fashion Fund. She was a finalist for the 2021 International Woolmark Prize. She twice won the Leaders of Change: Environment Award at the 2021 and 2022 Fashion Awards. Williams won the 2024 Fabric of Life Award for Designer of the Year.

In autumn 2025, Williams' first painting exhibition titled This Wild, Achingly Beautiful Place was held at the Bethlem Gallery in South East London.

Williams returned to London Fashion Week after a four year pause with an AW26 capsule collection for Toast titled The Light We Carry. It was the second edition of the Toast Renewed series. The collection incorporated Williams' paintings into crochet and patchwork; she took inspiration from traditional Manx craft and her grandmother's 1920s hand-me-downs.

== Personal life ==
In 2013, Williams was diagnosed with the chronic illness New Daily Persistent Headache (NDPH). She experienced a severe flare-up of the condition in 2022, which caused her to move back to the Isle of Man.
