= Taiba Akhuetie =

British Nigerian artist (born 1991/1992)

- Born: 1991/1992 (age 34–35); Kingston, Surrey, England
- Occupation: Artist
- Known for: Hair art

Taiba Akhuetie (born 1991/1992) is a British artist of Nigerian descent who creates art using synthetic hair.

Akhuetie grew up in a Nigerian household in Kingston, Surrey. Living in "a very white middle-class area", she learned about societal preferences for European hair. She learned how to braid from her mother and an auntie, and braided the hair of her schoolmates.

In 2014, Akhuetie and her friend Jessy Linton launched a braiding service, Keash. The service expanded into a salon and beauty agency.

When her salon work was sidelined by the COVID-19 pandemic, Akhuetie began making artwork with hair, primarily synthetic hair purchased in bulk from Black hair shops in London. In 2021 she held her first solo exhibition, We Need Some More Black in Hair, with photography by Aidan Zamiri. The exhibition featured braids made into articles of clothing and everyday objects. A TikTok video Akhuetie posted in 2024, showing an umbrella covered with synthetic hair, had received more than 100,000 views by May 2026. In May 2026, Akhuetie held an exhibition at the Sarabande Foundation, The Tone: Taiba’s World of Hair.

The Nue Black Aesthetic, a 2026 exhibition at London's Design Museum curated by Charlene Prempeh includes pieces by Akhuetie alongside works by Ini Archibong, Phoebe Collings-James, Nifemi Marcus-Bello, Samuel Ross, and Bianca Saunders.

Akhuetie's clients have included FKA Twigs, Jorja Smith, Burna Boy, Tems, Rihanna, and Cate Blanchett.
