= Elle (magazine) =

French women's fashion lifestyle magazine

- Cover of the 23 October 2025 issue, Vanessa Paradis by The Bardos
- Editor-in-Chief (Magazine): Nina Garcia
- Editor-in-Chief (Fashion): Brune de Margerie
- Categories: Lifestyle
- Frequency: Weekly
- Paid circulation: 11,336,570
- Total circulation: 11,424,963 (2025)
- Founder: Hélène Gordon-Lazareff
- First issue: 21 November 1945; 80 years ago
- Company: Hachette Filipacchi Médias
- Country: France
- Based in: Paris
- Language: French
- Website: elle.fr
- ISSN: 0888-0808
- OCLC: 697050973

Elle (French pronunciation: [ɛl]; lit. 'She' or 'Her'; stylised in all caps) is a French weekly women's fashion and lifestyle magazine. It offers a mixture of fashion, beauty, and general lifestyle content. It has been published in Paris since its 1945 founding by Hélène Gordon-Lazareff.

The magazine has a global audience reach of over 250 million people monthly, 50 international editions, and spin-off publications such as Elle Décoration, Elle Men, and Elle à Table. The magazine is considered "one of the world's largest fashion and lifestyle publications".

== Background ==
Elle (lit. 'She' or 'Her') is a French fashion magazine founded in 1945 by Hélène Gordon-Lazareff. Elle is a weekly publication, published fifty-two times per year.

=== Circulation ===
Total paid circulation (average)
Year	2017	2018	2019	2020	2021	2022	2023	2024	
Circulation	340,690	342,453	339,151	330,895	314,834	288,254	263,562	238,052	222,286

=== Editors ===
Editor-in-Chief/Editorial Director	Start year	End year
Hélène Gordon-Lazareff	1945	1972
Éliane Victor	1978	1982
Anne-Marie Périer		2002
Valérie Toranian	2002	2014
Françoise-Marie Santucci	2014	2016
Erin Doherty	2016	2021
Véronique Philipponnat	2021	present

== History ==
Hélène Gordon-Lazareff, Russian-born and Paris-raised, started Elle in Paris in the immediate aftermath of World War II. It was first sold as a supplement to France-Soir, edited at the time by Hélène's husband, Pierre Lazareff. Hélène, Elle's pioneering founder, returned to Paris from New York City to create a unique publication that grappled with the many forces shaping women's lives in France in 1945. Women won the right to vote in 1944, and Elle dove immediately into long-form "newspaper-like" features on women's role in national politics and the growing feminist movement. Elle would "celebrate a new type of woman: independent, modern, active, comfortable in her own skin and her time". The first issue of Elle France was published on 21 November 1945 featuring Yolande Bloin on the cover dressed by Elsa Schiaparelli. Bloin was an actress in Jacques Becker's film Falbalas. The magazine had a circulation of 110,000 copies in 1945.

In the Elle articles featuring rising fashion designers, the magazine would provide free patterns of some of their fashion pieces. This allowed the general public to experience haute couture as the glamour of the fashion world was becoming accessible to the common working class.

Its 100th issue, published on 14 October 1947, featured the work of Christian Dior just eight months after his debut show. Likewise, Brigitte Bardot had her first Elle cover at age 17, on 7 January 1952, months before her screen debut in Manina, the Girl in the Bikini.

On 2 April 1956, Grace Kelly appeared on the cover of Elle France, a few days before her marriage to Rainier III, Prince of Monaco. On 16 July 1956, Elle France featured Marilyn Monroe on the cover.

By the 1960s, Elle had a readership of 800,000 across France and was said to "not so much reflect fashion as decree it." This dominance was reflected in the famous slogan: "Si elle lit elle lit Elle (If she reads, she reads Elle)" (lit. "If she reads she reads She").

In 1987, Elle Decoration was launched in France by the Lagardère Group.

In 1995, the magazine circulated 5 million copies worldwide.

In 2011, Hearst Corporation reached a €651M deal with Lagardère to purchase the rights to publish Elle Magazine in fifteen countries, including the United Kingdom, Italy, Spain, Russia, and Ukraine. Lagardère, which struggled in the international market in the 2000s, retained the rights to the French edition and would collect royalties from the international editions. By retaining ownership of the Elle brand in France and through licensing forms in 25 countries, Lagardère remained "the guarantor of brand consistency". The strategic decisions on Elle concerning the countries managed by Hearst would be "taken in close consultation" with Lagardère.

In April 2018, Lagardère sold Elle France to Daniel Křetínský via his holding company, Czech Media Invest (CMI), parent of Czech News Center. Lagardère, as a subsidiary of Bolloré family-owned Louis Hachette Group, continues to own the Elle brand in France and internationally by granting a "license for the exploitation of magazines".

At the end of 2021, Elle announced that all global editions would ban fur from their pages as of 1 January 2023, citing "a really great opportunity to increase awareness for animal welfare, bolster the demand for sustainable and innovative alternatives and foster a more humane fashion industry."

=== Elle and politics ===
Elle magazine, while predominantly known for fashion and beauty, has frequently explored political and social issues. Some of the key topics covered by Elle include gender equality.

Elle has published articles on combating gender inequality, showcasing influential women and advocating for equal pay and opportunities within the workplace. One notable edition was its "Women in Politics" issue, which shone a spotlight on female politicians worldwide. Elle has consistently raised awareness of women's health and reproductive rights. The magazine covered the global struggles for access to safe abortion services, notably in the U.S. following legislative changes. Elle has also addressed issues of social justice, including racial equality and LGBTQ+ rights. It reported on the Black Lives Matter movement, emphasizing the importance of representation and inclusivity within all industries. In 2025, Elle announced in Italy the 2025 Nobel Peace Prize nomination for the sociologist Porpora Marcasciano (first transgender individual in history to be nominated to the prize), nominated by Dr. Tiziano Peccia.

=== Staff ===
Elle editors have included Jean-Dominique Bauby in France, who became known for writing a book after suffering almost total paralysis.

== Editions ==
As of 2026, fifty-one editions of Elle are in operation, twenty-six editions of Elle Decoration, (Note: also published as Elle Decor) nine editions of Elle Men, (Note: also published as Elle Man) and eight editions of Elle à Table. (Note: also published as Elle Cocina or Elle Gourmet or Elle Mat & Vin)

Elle also publishes region-specific editions within or across countries, such as Elle Hong Kong (Note: When launched in 1987, Hong Kong was not a Chinese special administrative region and instead a dependent territory of the United Kingdom) and Elle Québec, published in addition to Elle China and Elle Canada respectively. In Belgium since 2003, Elle is published as Elle Belgique (in French and for Wallonia) and Elle België (in Dutch for Flanders). Elle Baltic was launched in 2026 for Estonia, Latvia, and Lithuania. Elle Middle East was launched in 2006 across the Middle East with Elle Oriental (published in Arabic and French for Egypt, Jordan, Lebanon and the Maghreb). The two publications were later rebranded into Elle Arabia and the French edition was dropped.

=== International editions ===
List of Elle international editions by date of launch:

- Elle Deutsche Ausgabe (for Switzerland and Austria; 1953–1978)
- Elle Suisse (for Switzerland; since 1957)
- Elle España (for Spain; 1965–1967, since 1986; prior to 1986 published as Ella)
- Elle Belgique (for Belgium; 1966–2003, since 2003)
- ОНА Elle (for Yugoslavia; 1960s–1970s)
- Elle Slovenija (for Slovenia; 1960s, since 2005)
- Elle Japon (since 1970; previously published as An An Elle Japon)
- Elle USA (since 1985)
- Elle UK (since 1985)
- Elle Italia (for Italy; since 1987)
- Elle Hong Kong (since 1987)
- 世界时装之苑 Elle China (since 1988)
- Elle Sverige (for Sweden; since 1988)
- Elle Brasil (for Brazil; 1988–2018; since 2020)
- Elle Deutsche Ausgabe (for Germany; since 1988)
- Elle Greece (since 1988)
- Elle Portugal (1988–2021)
- Elle Québec (for Quebec, since 1989)
- Elle Nederland (for the Netherlands, since 1989)
- Elle Australia (1990–2002; 2013–2020; since 2024)
- Elle Taiwan (since 1991; previously published as Elle Taipei)
- Elle Korea (since 1992)
- Elle Singapore (since 1993)
- Elle en Español (for Latin America; since 1994)
- Elle México (for Mexico; since 1994)
- Elle Czech (for Czechia; since 1994)
- Elle Argentina (since 1994)
- Elle Polska (for Poland; since 1994)
- Elle Thailand (since 1994)
- Elle Chile (1994–2005)
- Elle Russia (1996–2022)
- Elle South Africa (1996–2018)
- Elle India (since 1996)
- Elle Norge (for Norway; since 1997)
- Elle Romania (since 1997)
- Elle Türkiye (since 1999)
- Elle Colombia (1999–?)
- Elle Canada (since 2001)
- Elle Ukraine (since 2001)
- Elle Magyarország (for Hungary; since 2001)
- Elle Croatia (since 2003)
- Elle België (for Belgium; since 2003)
- Elle Serbia (since 2005)
- Elle Bulgaria (since 2005)
- Elle Arabia (for Bahrain, Kuwait, Lebanon, Oman, Qatar, Saudi Arabia, and the United Arab Emirates; since 2006; previously published as Elle Arab World)
- Elle Oriental (for Egypt, Jordan, Lebanon and the Maghreb; 2006–?)
- Elle Indonesia (since 2008)
- Elle Finland (2008–2020)
- Elle Danmark (for Denmark; since 2008)
- Phái đẹp Elle Vietnam (2010–2020; since 2021)
- Elle Lebanon (2012–?)
- Elle Malaysia (2014–2017; since 2024)
- Elle Kazakhstan (since 2015)
- Elle Côte d'Ivoire (for the Ivory Coast; 2017–2025)
- Elle Lithuania (for Lithuania; since 2024)
- Elle Egypt (since 2024; digital-only)
- Elle Luxembourg (since 2024)
- Elle O'zbekiston (for Uzbekistan; 2024–2025; since 2026)
- Elle Baltic (for Estonia, Latvia, and Lithuania; since 2026)
- Elle Afrique Francophone (for Benin, Cameroon, Gabon, the Ivory Coast, and Senegal; since 2026)
- Elle Maroc (for Morocco; since 2026)
- Elle Africa (for Ghana, Kenya, Nigeria, and South Africa; launching in 2026)
- Elle Philippines (launching in 2027)

==== Elle Afrique Francophone/Elle Côte d'Ivoire ====
In February 2017, Elle Côte d'Ivoire was launched as a digital-only publication. It later began publishing print issues before ceasing publication then returning to print in 2025. In February 2026 the magazine rebranded to Elle Afrique Francophone, now covering 23 Francophone African countries. The debut cover of Elle Afrique Francophone featured Naomi Campbell photographed by Trevor Stuurman in a Chanel outfit styled by Law Roach.

==== Elle Australia ====
In 1990, Elle Australia launched. However, in July 2020 Bauer Media Australia licence holder of the Australian edition announced its closure, citing declining advertising revenue and travel restrictions associated with the COVID-19 pandemic. In November 2020, the magazine returned in a digital-only form. In September 2023, it was confirmed that the magazine would return to print in March 2024, published by Are Media, the successor to Bauer Media Australia.

==== Elle Brasil ====
A Brazilian edition launched in 1988 and the first run of the magazine would cease publication in 2018. The magazine was relaunched in 2020 by former its editor-in-chief Susana Barbosa.

It was the first commercial magazine in the world to have a transgender model on its cover, with Lea T in December 2011. The Brazilian edition had also discovered transgender model Valentina Sampaio and had put her on the cover before French Vogue.

==== Elle Canada ====
The magazine entered publication in 2001. In November 2016, Elle Canada promoted Vanessa Craft to editor-in-chief, making her the first black woman at the helm of an Elle magazine globally.

In 2020, the Toronto branch offices were closed and the magazine continued publication from Montreal.

==== Elle China ====
The Chinese version of the magazine began publication in 1988. It was the first four-colour fashion magazine offered in China. The magazine was an informational and educational tool for opening the Chinese textile market. Patricia Wang was the first editor of Elle China.

==== Elle Egypt ====
An Egyptian edition launched in April 2024, a print version of the magazine was planned to launch in 2024 under the direction of Susan Sabet. As of 2026, the Egyptian edition is digital-only and Susan Sabet is no longer working for the magazine.

Elle Lithuania

Elle Lithuania launched in February 2024, the magazine is published by the team who previously published L'Officiel Lithuania from 2010 till its closure in 2023.

==== Elle Malaysia ====
Elle Malaysia entered publication in March 2014 and was published in English. The magazine ceased publication in 2017. The Malaysian edition relaunched in 2024 and is now published in Bahasa Melayu.

Elle O'zbekiston

Elle O'zbekiston began publication in September 2024. The Uzbek edition would close in November 2025 after payment disputes between the publishing company and editorial staff. It relaunched in early 2026.

==== Elle Russia ====
A Russian edition of the magazine began publication in 1996. The Russian edition was closed in 2022, after the licence was terminated due to the Russian Invasion of Ukraine.

==== US Elle ====
US Elle launched in 1985. In 1991, the magazine's sales were in decline.

Elle.com was launched in 2007.

In September 2017, it was announced that Roberta Myers was stepping down from the role of editor-in-chief of Elle USA, position she held since 2000, stating through a memo to the staff that "I want to spend the next seasons as available to my children as I can be, and so I take my leave of Elle now". A day later of the announcement, it was reported that Nina Garcia, creative director of Marie Claire was appointed as the new editor-in-chief effective 18 September.

== Editors ==
- Valia Taha (Arabia)
- Arlette Barrionuevo, Gabriela Silvestre (Argentina)
- Jessica Bailey (Australia)
- Carmen Kass, Ginta Kubiliute, Līga Zemture (Baltic)
- Marie Guérin (Belgium)
- Susana Barbosa (Brazil)
- Maria Georgieva (Bulgaria)
- Joanna Fox (Canada)
- Sun Zhe (China)
- Jelena Veljača (Croatia)
- Thea Prokop (Czechia)
- Cecilie Ingdal (Denmark)
- Christian Khayat (Egypt)
- Julie Yapo (Francophone Africa)
- Franzsika Frosch (Germany)
- Maria Patoucha (Greece)
- Winnie Wan (Hong Kong)
- Vivien Madai (Hungary)
- Ainee Nizami Ahmedi (India)
- Ruben William Steven (Indonesia)
- Manuela Ravasio (Italy)
- Kanako Sakai (Japan)
- Dana Lee (Kazakhstan)
- Eun Mi Chae (Korea)
- Agnė Gilytė (Lithuania)
- Marie-Adélaïde Leclercq-Olhagaray (Luxembourg)
- Sarah Hani Jamil (Malaysia)
- Claudia Cándano (Mexico)
- Zineb Ibnouzahir (Morocco)
- Emma Vloeimans (Netherlands)
- Petra Middelthon (Norway)
- Marta Tabiś-Szymanek (Poland)
- Joanna Fox (Quebec)
- Roxana Voloseniuc (Romania)
- Teodora Bogdanovic (Serbia)
- Charmaine Ho (Singapore)
- Petra Windschnurer (Slovenia)
- Benedetta Poletti (Spain)
- Elina Grothén (Sweden)
- Anne Marie Philippe (Switzerland)
- Kayt Hsueh (Taiwan)
- Chatlina Cheyjunya (Thailand)
- Suzan Yurdacan (Turkey)
- Kenya Hunt (United Kingdom)
- Sonya Zabouga (Ukraine)
- Nina García (United States)
- Vacant (Uzbekistan)
- Liênchi Nguyen (Vietnam)

=== Men's ===
- Valia Taha (Arabia)
- Jessica Bailey (Australia)
- Susana Barbosa (Brazil)
- Liv He (China)
- Ken Law (Hong Kong)
- Saugirdas Vaitulionis (Lithuania)
- Claudia Candano (Mexico)
- Charmaine Ho (Singapore)
- Nichakul Kitayanubhongse (Thailand)
- Suzan Yurdacan (Turkey)
- Thùy Duong (Vietnam)

=== Timeline ===
Country/region	Circulation dates	Editor-in-chief	Start year	End year
United Kingdom (Elle UK)	1985–present	Sally Brampton	1985	1989
United Kingdom (Elle UK)	1985–present	Nicola Jeal	1993	
United Kingdom (Elle UK)	1985–present	Fiona McIntosh	1998	2001
United Kingdom (Elle UK)	1985–present	Sarah Bailey	2002	2004
United Kingdom (Elle UK)	1985–present	Lorraine Candy	2004	2017
United Kingdom (Elle UK)	1985–present	Anne-Marie Curtis	2017	2019
United Kingdom (Elle UK)	1985–present	Farrah Storr	2019	2022
United Kingdom (Elle UK)	1985–present	Kenya Hunt	2022	present
Italy (Elle Italia)	1987–present	Carla Sozzani	1987	1987
Italy (Elle Italia)	1987–present	Massimo Russo	2021	2024
Italy (Elle Italia)	1987–present	Manuela Ravasio	2024	present
Australia (Elle Australia)	1990–2002	Deborah Thomas	1994	1997
Australia (Elle Australia)	1990–2002	Marina Go	1997	2002
Australia (Elle Australia)	2013–2020	Justine Cullen	2013	2018
Australia (Elle Australia)	2013–2020	Genevra Leek	2018	2020
Australia (Elle Australia)	2024–present	Grace O'Neill	2024	2025
Australia (Elle Australia)	2024–present	Jessica Bailey	2025	present
Argentina (Elle Argentina)	1994–present	Ana Torrejón	1994	2007
Argentina (Elle Argentina)	1994–present	Graciela Maya	2008	2022
Argentina (Elle Argentina)	1994–present	Arlette Barrionuevo	2022	present
Argentina (Elle Argentina)	1994–present	Gabriela Silvestre	2022	present
Lithuania (Elle Lithuania)	2024–present	Irina Sinė	2024	2025
Lithuania (Elle Lithuania)	2024–present	Agnė Gilytė	2025	present
Egypt (Elle Egypt)	2024–present	Susan Sabet	2024	2024
Egypt (Elle Egypt)	2024–present	Christian Khayat	2026	present
Luxembourg (Elle Luxembourg)	2024–present	Marie-Adélaïde Leclercq-Olhagaray	2024	present
Uzbekistan (Elle O'zbekiston)	2024–2025; 2026–present	Polina Agliamova	2024	2025
Uzbekistan (Elle O'zbekiston)	2024–2025; 2026–present	Rushana Mamadalieva	2025	2025
Estonia, Latvia, Lithuania (Elle Baltic)	2026–present	Carmen Kass	2026	present
Estonia, Latvia, Lithuania (Elle Baltic)	2026–present	Ginta Kubiliute	2026	present
Estonia, Latvia, Lithuania (Elle Baltic)	2026–present	Līga Zemture	2026	present

== Other markets ==
In the 1980s, Elle signed an agreement with the Japanese Itokin, a group based in Osaka specialising in ready-to-wear. Elle has been selling its lingerie in Japan for over forty years through licensing agreements. Elle has over 150 partners in 80 countries, all paying royalties to the brand. Elle has more than 3,000 stores worldwide, mainly in Asia. Under the Elle brand, there are around ten cafés, hair salons and spas. The brand also sells fashion, beauty and home decor products.

Nissan and Elle collaborated and unveiled the Nissan Micra Elle in September 2012, a limited-edition car specially designed for women.

The brand has also been launched in the hospitality industry. In 2023, the fashion magazine opened its first hotel, Maison Elle, on the 17th of Paris. Other Elle Hotel projects have been announced for Mexico and around fifteen high-end hotels in the heart of cities that would open in the next ten years.

In June 2024, an article from Elle Decor announced the launch of the media brand's first residential tower located in Miami.

== See also ==
- List of fashion magazines
- List of women's magazines
- Didier Guérin, executive in charge of new releases
- Category:Elle (magazine) writers
- Lists of Elle cover models
