= Bianca Saunders =

British fashion designer

- Born: 1993 (age 32–33); Catford, London, England
- Education: Kingston University; Royal College of Art
- Awards: ANDAM Fashion Award (2021); New Establishment Menswear, The Fashion Awards (2023); BFC/GQ Designer Fashion Fund (2024); BFC/Vogue Designer Fashion Fund (2026)

Bianca Saunders (born 1993) is a British fashion designer who founded the London-based menswear label that carries her name in 2017, after completing a master's degree at the Royal College of Art. Of Jamaican descent and raised in south-east London, she is known for tailoring that reworks conventional menswear through twisted seams, rolled shoulders and draping techniques drawn from womenswear, and for work that examines ideas of masculinity and Caribbean diaspora identity.

In 2021 Saunders won the grand prize at the 32nd ANDAM Fashion Awards in Paris, worth €300,000 and a year of mentoring from Balenciaga chief executive Cédric Charbit. She was a finalist for the LVMH Prize in the same year, and has since won the New Establishment Menswear prize at the Fashion Awards in 2023, the BFC/GQ Designer Fashion Fund in 2024 and the BFC/Vogue Designer Fashion Fund in 2026.

== Early life and education ==
Saunders was born in Catford, in south-east London, to a large family of Caribbean descent, and grew up in the surrounding borough of Lewisham near her parents, grandparents and extended family; she has relatives in Jamaica whom she visited for family occasions. Her father worked as a plasterer, and she has credited a grandmother who sewed and an uncle who worked as a graphic designer with drawing her toward a creative career. Her mother, Yvonne, is a hairdresser whose salon clients Saunders has used as a sounding board for her work; relatives have appeared in the label's photo shoots, and her mother caters backstage at its shows.

She took a bachelor's degree in fashion design at Kingston University before a master's degree at the Royal College of Art. On the recommendation of a tutor she had applied to the college, where she was taught by the head of the fashion program, Zowie Broach. She graduated in menswear in 2017, having moved into the category at a tutor's suggestion and designed an early collection around the men in her family who had played in a funk band; she has said she found there was "less to see and more space to change" in menswear at the time. Her graduate collection, "Personal Politics", was presented with a lookbook of portraits by the photographer Adama Jalloh and accompanied by the film Permission, directed by Akinola Davies Jr.

== Career ==
=== Founding the label ===
Saunders launched her eponymous label in 2017 and showed it for the first time at London Fashion Week Men's in 2018. She won the British Fashion Council's NEWGEN prize for emerging designers, and in 2020 was named to the Forbes 30 Under 30 Europe list for art and culture. That year she moved her studio out of her home and into the Sarabande Foundation, the charity established by Alexander McQueen, and released the film The Pedestrian as part of GucciFest, a digital festival of films by fifteen independent designers, with a pre-fall collection made for the project. As of early 2021 she remained the label's only full-time employee, working with a stylist, a public relations agency and part-time help around shows.

=== Move to Paris ===
In July 2021 Saunders won the grand prize at the 32nd edition of the ANDAM Fashion Awards, held at the Palais-Royal in Paris. The award carried an endowment of €300,000 and a year of mentoring from Cédric Charbit, chief executive of Balenciaga and president of that year's jury; she was chosen ahead of finalists including Wales Bonner, Casablanca, Rokh, GmbH, Area and Ludovic de Saint Sernin. For the first time in the prize's history a second mentorship was added, given to Wales Bonner. Saunders was also one of nine finalists for the 2021 LVMH Prize, which was won by Nensi Dojaka.

She staged her first solo runway show in January 2022 at the Palais de Tokyo during Paris Fashion Week, presenting the autumn/winter 2022 collection "A Stretch". The collection featured warped check prints, folded trousers with twisted inseams and jackets with pleated shoulders; at the time the clothes were made by Saunders and three employees in London, and the business was built largely on wholesale.

In February 2023 she released a nine-piece leather capsule with AT.Kollektive, a project led by Ecco Leather, alongside the designers Natacha Ramsay-Levi, Kostas Murkudis and Isaac Reina. It comprised blazers, square-toed shoes and bags together with an armchair, her first piece of furniture.

Saunders designed the outfit worn by the singer Usher to the 2023 Met Gala, whose theme was Karl Lagerfeld: A Line of Beauty: a black satin corseted reverse blazer with a twist detail at the back, worn with detached white cotton sleeves. She attended the event alongside him. Nick Jonas wore the label to the 2025 Met Gala, and Stormzy and Naomi Campbell have also worn it. She has dressed Harry Styles and Hailey Bieber.

For autumn/winter 2024 she released "Nothing Personal", her first unisex collection, made with Nona Source, the LVMH deadstock fabric business. The collection took its title from the 1964 book by Richard Avedon and James Baldwin, and reworked existing house styles including her twisted denim and a jacket that echoed the one she had made for Usher. Her spring/summer 2025 collection was shown at the Bastille Design Centre in Paris.

In October 2025 Saunders released a four-piece capsule collection with Tate, consisting of a scarf, a hat, a jumper and a long-sleeved T-shirt drawing on the paintings The Good and Evil Angels and The Simoniac Pope by William Blake. The pieces were sold through the museum and designed as non-gendered; Saunders said working with an art institution allowed her to "slow down, research, and respond", and cast friends she had met at Tate events in the campaign.

For the autumn/winter 2025 season she showed "Dichotomy" in Paris, a collection examining movement and constraint that drew on archival footage of male Jamaican dancers, Robert Longo's Men in the Cities photographs and the slashed canvases of Steven Parrino. The presentation was staged with the artist Shanti Bell, with whom Saunders had previously worked on the Somerset House exhibition The Missing Thread.

In June 2026 Saunders won the BFC/Vogue Designer Fashion Fund, which carries a grant of £150,000 together with business mentoring and professional services. She was selected by a panel chaired by British Fashion Council chief executive Laura Weir and British Vogue head of editorial content Chioma Nnadi, ahead of a shortlist that included Aaron Esh, Clio Peppiatt, Knwls, Onalaja and Talia Byre. Presenting her case to the jury, Saunders said her womenswear customers had asked her to extend the label's size range to run from a UK size 6 to a size 18.

The following month she announced a spring 2027 collection of 30 pieces, "Meet You Before Sunrise", made with the creative company The Midnight Club. It was her first collaboration with a creative agency and the agency's first with a fashion designer, and it coincided with the company's tenth anniversary. The campaign paired oversized shirts, asymmetric draping and wide-leg trousers with knitwear and graphic streetwear. Selected pieces were offered for pre-order through her website, with the rest of the collection due in 2027.

== Design approach ==
Saunders takes familiar garments and alters their construction: denim is twisted through the leg, shoulders are rolled or exaggerated, and prints reproduce the creases fabric acquires in wear. Shirts and T-shirts have carried Jamaican patois, symbols and family photographs. Writing in GQ, Murray Clark described her method as small alterations that carry large arguments, pointing to warped pinstripes and enlarged collars on an otherwise plain shirt; Saunders told him that she aims for a balance between conceptual and commercial design because "in general, men have always played it a bit safe". The British Fashion Council has described her work as reinterpreting the traditional codes of menswear through a diasporic lens. Awarding her the 2021 ANDAM prize, Charbit said she had "presented a solid and unique project anchored in the now and today's values".

Saunders is one of a small number of women, and a smaller number of women of color, designing menswear. Although the label began as menswear, she has said its customer base came to include women and non-binary wearers, and that fashion is moving toward unisex clothing. Collections are frequently released alongside films, zines or artworks made with collaborators from her circle in London.

== Recognition ==
A three-piece menswear ensemble by Saunders was chosen, alongside a gown by Simone Rocha, as the Fashion Museum Bath's Dress of the Year 2023, entering the museum's permanent collection. The look, a belted coat, shirt and twisted-seam trousers in a screen-print of her own design showing plants near her home in south-east London, had been commissioned for the exhibition The Missing Thread: Untold Stories of Black British Fashion at Somerset House in 2023 and was inspired by the Trinidadian textile artist Althea McNish. The selection was made by the British Fashion Council's chief executive, Caroline Rush.

Saunders won the BFC/GQ Designer Fashion Fund in 2024, receiving £100,000 and business mentoring; the other shortlisted designers were Bleue Burnham, Labrum London and Saul Nash. It was the tenth edition of the fund, and the award also carried pro bono legal services from the London firm Sheridans. She had won the New Establishment Menswear award at the 2023 Fashion Awards, held at the Royal Albert Hall in London.

The Nue Black Aesthetic, a 2026 exhibition at London's Design Museum curated by Charlene Prempeh includes pieces by Saunders alongside works by Taiba Akhuetie, Ini Archibong, Phoebe Collings-James, Nifemi Marcus-Bello, and Samuel Ross.
