= Trevor Stuurman =

South African photographer and multi-disciplinary artist

Trevor Stuurman (born 25 December 1992) is a South African photographer and multi-disciplinary artist. Stuurman is a contemporary African artist whose works focuses on African identity and African culture.

Trevor Stuurman was born in Kimberley, Northern Cape. His practice spans over multiple disciplines including photography, fashion and installation.
