= Samuel Ross =

British designer, creative director, and artist

Dr Samuel Ross MBE
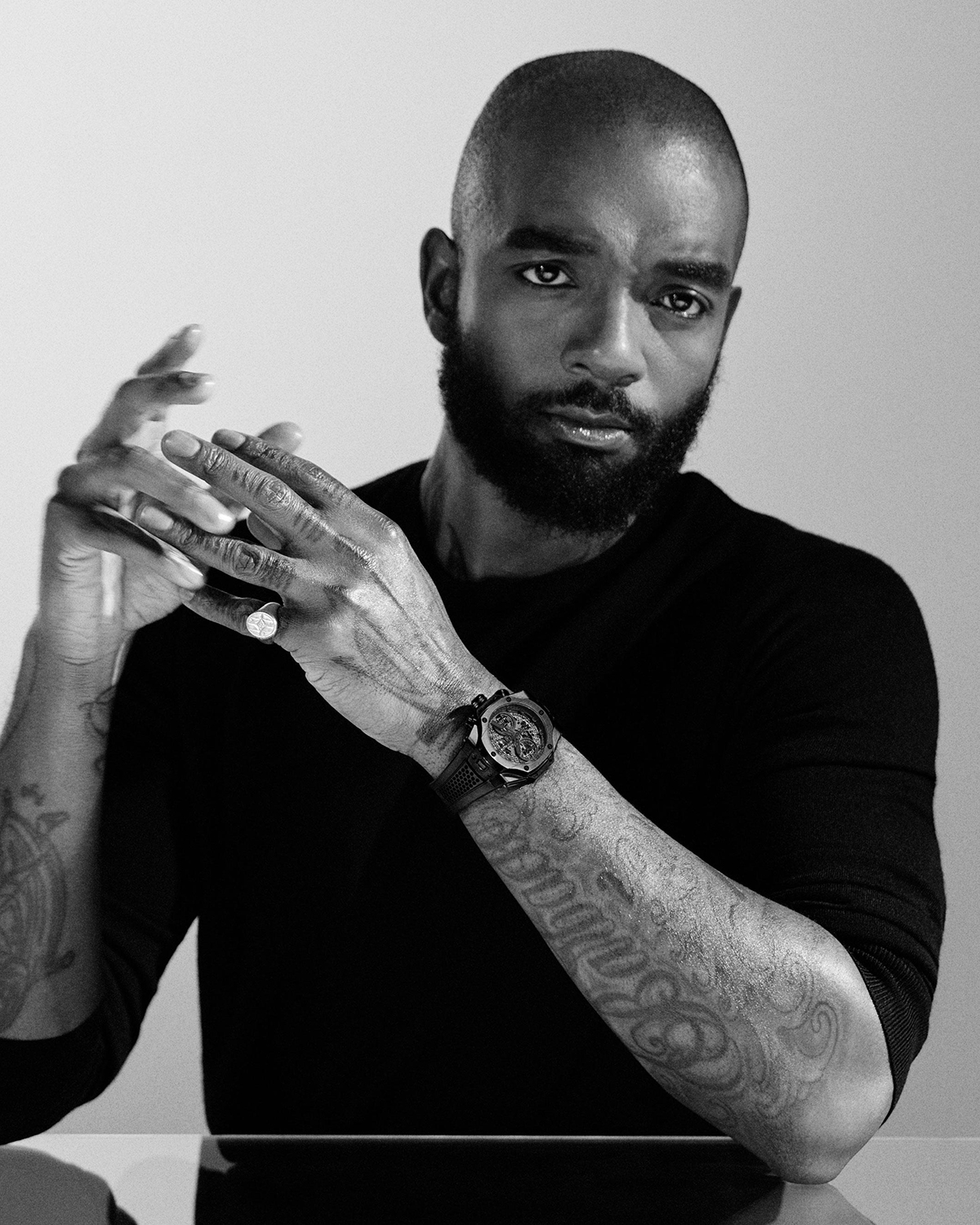
- Ross in 2026
- Born: May 26, 1991 (age 35); Brixton, United Kingdom
- Education: De Montfort University
- Occupations: Artist; Creative director; Designer; Entrepreneur
- Awards: Honorary doctorate, University of Westminster (2021); Member of the Order of the British Empire (2023); Honorary Doctor of Design, De Montfort University (2025)
- Website: samuel-ross.com

Samuel Ross MBE (born 1991) is a British fashion designer, creative director, and artist. He is known for founding the fashion label A-COLD-WALL*, Industrial Design studio SR_A SR_A, and the Black British Artists Grants Programme. Since founding these organisations, Ross has collaborated with companies such as Apple, Kohler, LVMH, Nike, and William Grant & Sons. Ross's output is often characterised as "social architecture for the body", captured through abstraction, brutalism, and deconstruction.

== Early life and education ==
Ross was born in the Brixton neighbourhood of London, United Kingdom to first generation parents of Caribbean descent. Shortly after his birth, he moved to Northamptonshire, United Kingdom. He attended and graduated from De Montfort University, Leicester where he received first class honours for a Bachelor of Arts in Graphic Design and Illustration and was awarded the FSG design award in 2012.

== Career ==
After graduating from university, Ross worked as a graphic and product designer for various commercial and industrial companies.

He went on to intern for, and was subsequently hired by, Virgil Abloh, who became Ross's mentor. In 2012, Ross became Abloh's first design assistant. During his time working for Abloh, Ross also designed for Kanye West's creative content company Donda and related companies. Ross's work has been compared to the Australian designer Marc Newson's early designs (Ross readily admits "that he wants to become his generation's [Marc] Newson"), as well as that of English graphic artist Peter Saville—both of whom have also become friends and admirers of Ross's work.

In 2014, Ross independently founded A-COLD-WALL*, a fashion label, self-described as a "material study for social architecture." The company was acquired by Tomorrow Ltd. in 2024.

In 2019, Ross and his business partner Yi Ng founded SR_A SR_A. Ross launched SR_A (Samuel Ross & Associates) at the Hublot Prize exhibition in the Serpentine Gallery in 2019. SR_A is a studio operating within the fields of artisan-driven, industrial beautification of precious garments, objects and space.

In 2020, Ross established the Black British Artists Grants Programme. Each year the scheme offers 10 bursaries of £2,500 to selected applicants from a range of art and design disciplines. Past recipients of the award include designer Mac Collins, designer Nifemi Marcus-Bello, photographer Ronan Mckenzie, and architect Dominique Petit-Frère. The programme has independently provided 50 artists with funding, connecting the next generation of talent to global institutions. The programme advisory board is composed of the following: The Kings Foundation, The Victoria and Albert Museum (V&A), The British Fashion Council, The Royal College of Art, The Design Museum and The University of Westminster. Ross summarises the endeavour as "holistic design for change".

In 2022, the V&A held an exhibition titled Fashion design: Samuel Ross / A-COLD-WALL*, and in 2023, Ross exhibited his paintings and sculptures in a solo show titled Land at the White Cube gallery in London, as well as Coarse, and exhibition of sculptural pieces that was his second solo show at the Freidman Benda gallery in New York. His work was also included in the exhibition Mirror Mirror: Reflections on Design at Chatsworth at Chatsworth House, and The New Transcendence at Friedman Benda Gallery, NY (both curated by Glenn Adamson). Examples of Ross's work are held in the Metropolitan Museum, Denver Art Museum, Dallas Museum of Art, Museum of Fine Arts, SCAD Museum of Art, National Museum of Scotland, as well as the Design Museum and V&A in London.

Also in 2023, Ross was hired by Apple for the newly created role of "Principal Design Consultant for Beats".

The next year, he designed a smart toilet and taps for Kohler.

Ross was the artistic director of the 2025 London Design Biennale. Also in 2025, he participated in Zara's 50th Anniversary collection along with a group of 50 artists and creative industry heavyweights including Pedro Almodóvar, David Chipperfield, Es Devlin, Vincent Van Duysen, Norman Foster, Luca Guadagnino, Annie Leibovitz, Kate Moss, and Marc Newson.

The Nue Black Aesthetic, a 2026 exhibition at London's Design Museum curated by Charlene Prempeh includes pieces by Ross alongside works by the British and African creatives Taiba Akhuetie, Ini Archibong, Phoebe Collings-James, Nifemi Marcus-Bello, and Bianca Saunders.

=== Design by Category ===
==== Technology ====
- WHOOP LLC
- Apple c/o Beats by Dre LLC

==== Horology ====
- Hublot (LVMH)

==== Fragrance ====
- Acqua di Parma (LVMH)

==== Eyewear ====
- Oakley (Luxottica SRL)

==== Bathroom ====
- Kohler LLC

==== Footwear ====
- Timberland LLC
- Dr. Martens Ltd

==== Sportswear ====
- Nike LLC
- Converse LLC

==== Liqueur and spirits ====
- The Balvenie
- Absolut Vodka

==== Automotive and transport ====
- RIDECAKE — EV motorbike

==== Architecture (permanent structures, temporary installations, public furniture and infrastructure) ====
- London Fashion Week, AW19 — Runway (2019)
- Milan Fashion Week, SS20 — Runway (2020)
- Design Miami, TERMINAL 01 — Large-scale installation (2023)
- Milan Design Week, TERMINAL 02 — Large-scale installation (2024)
- Miami Design District — Permanent installation, twenty steel benches (2024)
- City of London, Sculpture in the City — Large-scale installation (2024)
- Milan Design Week, TRANSPOSITION — Large-scale installation (2025)
- Hublot Watch Manufacture, Geneva, Switzerland (Completion: 2027–2028)

== Honours and awards ==
Ross is the recipient of the 2018 British Fashion Award for Emerging Menswear Designer, the 2019 Hublot Design Prize, Forbes 30 under 30 Europe, the 2020 GQ USA Fashion Award and the 2020 People of the Year British Fashion Award for his philanthropic endeavours. He received an honorary doctorate from The University of Westminster in 2021. Ross is a recipient of a 2021 British Fashion Award, within the category 'Leaders of Change'. Ross was appointed Member of the Order of the British Empire (MBE) in the 2024 New Year Honours for services to fashion. In 2025, Ross was awarded an honorary doctorate by De Montfort University.

- 2012 FSG design award
- 2017 British Fashion Council (BFC) Newgen Award
- 2018 British Fashion Award, Emerging Talent
- 2018 LVMH Prize (finalist)
- 2018 Andam Grand Prize (nominated)
- 2018 BFC Newgen 2018/2019
- 2019 Hublot LVMH Design Prize
- 2019 Forbes 30 Under 30
- 2019 BFC GQ Fashion Fund Award
- 2019 BFC Newgen
- 2020 British Fashion Award, Person of the Year (philanthropy)
- 2020 GQ USA Fashion Award
- 2020 International Woolmark Prize 2020 (finalist)
- 2021 British Fashion Award, Leader of Change Award
- 2021 Honorary PhD (Doctor Honoris Causa) conferred by the University of Westminster
- 2022 London Chamber Of Commerce, Outstanding Contribution To Fashion
- 2022 Soho House Award, Established Change-maker Award
- 2023 Member of the Order of the British Empire (MBE) for services to fashion
- 2024 Best Contemporary Design Object, DESIGN MIAMI.BASEL
- 2025 Elle Deco International Design Award (EDIDA)
- 2025 Elle Deco Japan – Young Design Talent Award
- 2025 Honorary Doctor of Design (Hon DDes), De Montfort University
