= Love On Tour =

2021–2023 concert tour by Harry Styles

- Tour by Harry Styles
- Location: Asia; Europe; North America; Oceania; South America
- Associated albums: Fine Line; Harry's House
- Start date: 4 September 2021
- End date: 22 July 2023
- No. of shows: 169
- Supporting acts: Blood Orange; Madison Cunningham; Madi Diaz; Gabriels; Ben Harper; Inhaler; Koffee; Jenny Lewis; Mitski; Arlo Parks; Orville Peck; Jessie Ware; Wet Leg; Ny Oh; Wolf Alice; Annie Mac; Mitch Rowland
- Box office: $617.3 million

Harry Styles concert chronology
- Harry Styles: Live on Tour (2017–2018); Love On Tour (2021–2023); Together, Together (2026–2027)

Love On Tour was the second concert tour by English singer-songwriter Harry Styles, in support of his second and third studio albums, Fine Line (2019) and Harry's House (2022). The tour consisted of seven legs spreading over the course of 22 months starting on 4 September 2021 in Las Vegas, Nevada, and concluded on 22 July 2023 in Reggio Emilia, Italy.

After being postponed twice due to the COVID-19 pandemic, the tour began on 4 September 2021 in Las Vegas, Nevada supporting Fine Line, consisting of 42 announced US dates in total. Styles later began touring internationally in June of the following year, promoting Fine Line as well as Harry's House. Love On Tour became one of the first full-capacity indoor arena concert tours to occur in the United States since the pandemic. The first leg grossed a total of $95 million and sold 719,000 tickets from 42 shows performed in North America from September to November 2021. The tour made another $55 million and sold 638,000 tickets from the 23 shows performed in Europe from June to July 2022. In total, Love On Tour grossed $617.3 million and sold five million tickets.

== Background ==
On 4 November 2019, Styles announced the release of his second studio album Fine Line, which was released on 13 December 2019; the first single "Lights Up" was released on digital platforms on 11 October. During a radio interview with Capital FM on the singer announced that he would tour the world through 2020. Styles announced the album's support tour, Love On Tour on November 13, exactly a month before the album's release.

In March 2020, it was announced that the European leg would be postponed to 2021, amid the COVID-19 pandemic. In June of the same year, Styles pushed back the North American leg of the tour, including the planned "Harryween" event, to 2021. In July 2021, it was announced that the dates for the US leg had been adjusted and would start in September 2021 instead of August. Depending on the state legislature, the event organizer required proof of COVID-19 vaccination or a negative diagnostic test within 48 hours prior to entry, in addition to wearing a mask, in order to attend Styles' show. On January 19, 2022, Styles announced European and South American tour dates.

In October 2021, during the tour, Styles held a two-day Halloween event at New York City's Madison Square Garden arena, called "Harryween Fancy Dress Party", where all concertgoers dressed in costumes, with Styles himself dressed as Dorothy Gale and a Pierrot clown. Many of the concertgoers were photographed on the scene by Vogue. In August 2022, Styles announced additional European dates, to take place from 13 May to 22 July 2023.

== Critical reception ==
The show received rave reviews from critics. Ramin Setoodeh of Variety praised Styles' performance during the show, highlighting the artist's energy and connection with the audience. Setoodeh noted that Styles was clearly enjoying himself and delivered a powerful setlist focused on his 2019 album Fine Line, along with tracks from his debut album and a One Direction hit, "What Makes You Beautiful".

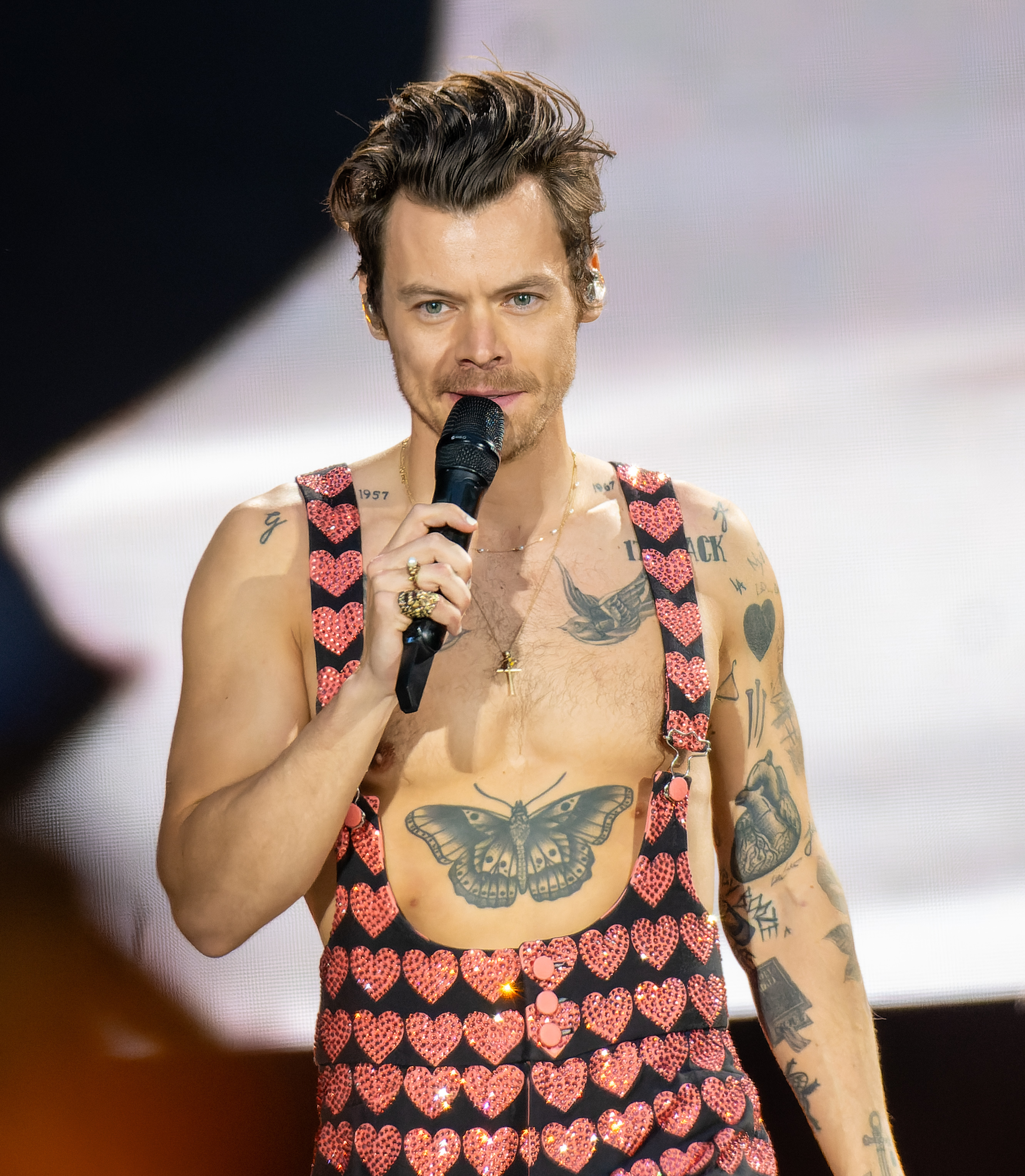
Harry Styles during his concert at Wembley Stadium in London on 17 June 2023

Brittany Spanos of Rolling Stone defined Styles' post-pandemic return to the stage at Madison Square Garden as triumphant. The concert, delayed by the pandemic, showcased Styles' electrifying performance and strong bond with fans eagerly awaiting the event. Spanos also highlighted that the show emphasized communal experiences and inclusive gestures, reinforcing Styles' message of kindness. She also noted that the encore, featuring "Kiwi" underscored Styles' rockstar charisma, leaving the audience excited and fully embracing his call for self-expression and celebration.

Jon Caramanica and Lindsay Zoladz of The New York Times attended Styles' 15-night residency at Madison Square Garden, examining how he wielded his star power and musical direction. Caramanica noted Styles' undeniable charisma and stage presence but questioned the depth of his musical impact, finding the performance more about showmanship than substance. Zoladz, contrasting with Caramanica, celebrated Styles as a consummate pop star catering to his fervent fanbase, highlighting his charismatic banter and stage engagement.

The Guardian gave the show in Glasgow a five-star review stating that the show, which celebrates his third album Harry's House (2022), was marked by an incredibly positive poptimism, without elaborate tricks, sophisticated choreography or pyrotechnics, just Styles' dazzling charisma, backed by a six-piece band and a catalog of music that crosses genres.

Will Richards of The Standard gave a four-star review of the show at Wembley Stadium in London, he stated that the atmosphere was marked by the exuberance of the fans, who dressed in vibrant colors and extravagant costumes. He also said the event was not just a concert, but a community celebration, where fans met in person for the first time and expressed support for each other, including with messages asking for help in coming out as gay. He stated that the show, although simple in terms of production, focused on fan interaction and celebrating authenticity.

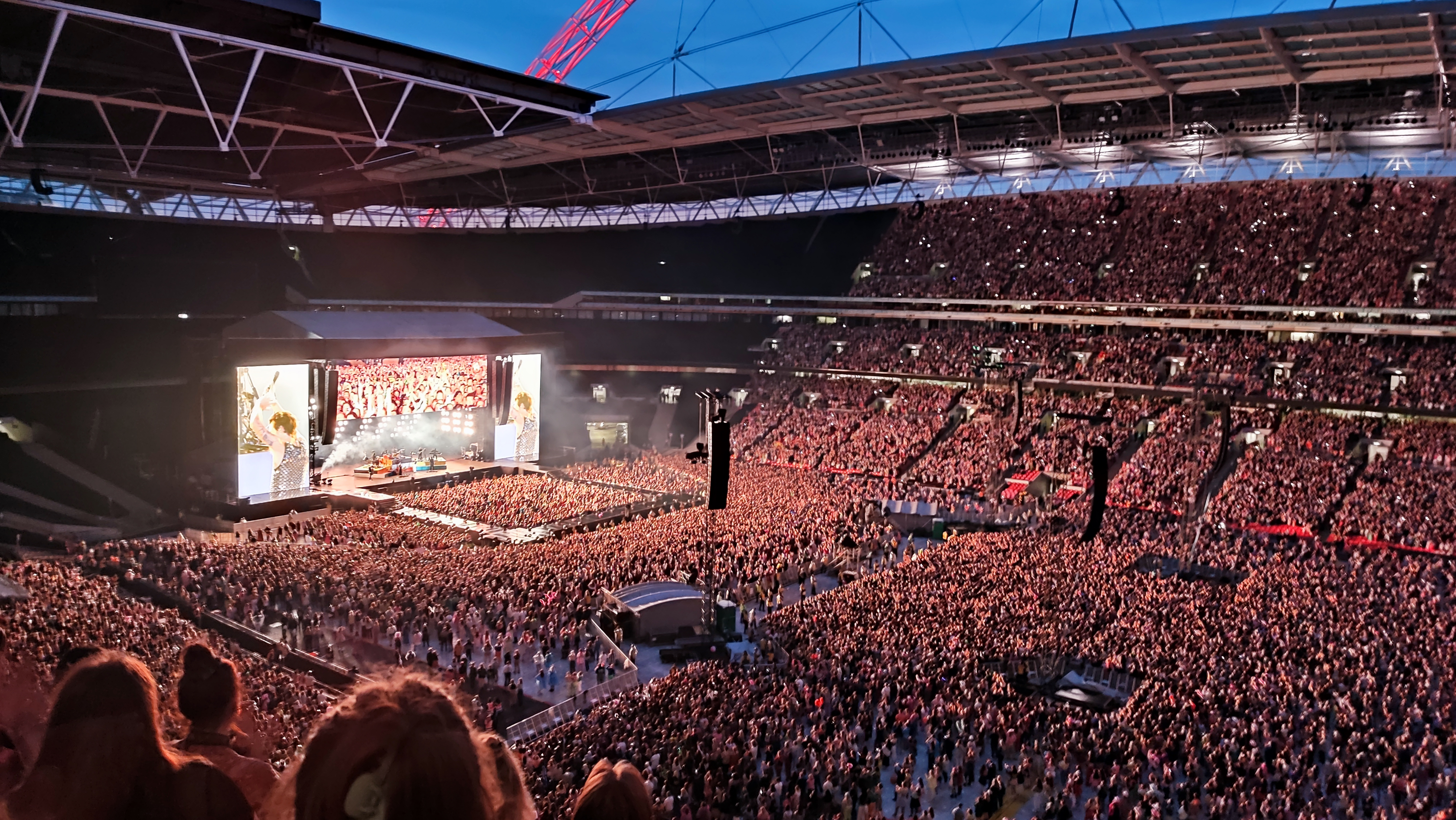
Audience for Styles' concert at Wembley Stadium in London on 19 June 2022

== Commercial performance ==
"Love on Tour" was ranked second on Pollstar's 2021 year-end list of worldwide tours, with a gross of 86.3 million dollars and a total of 669,051 tickets sold across 39 shows in its North American leg. The tour sold out numerous shows and was a success. The tour's four shows at Wembley Stadium in London were ranked seventh on Pollstar's 2023 year-end list of the top 300 concert grosses, earning $37,341,665 with a total of 335,394 tickets sold. Several other shows from the tour also appeared on the list. The tour grossed a total of $617.3 million according to Billboard, with over five million tickets sold. At the time, the tour ended as the fifth-highest grossing and eighth-most attended tour ever.

== Accolades ==
Accolades for Love On Tour
Organization	Year	Category	Result	Ref.
Pollstar Awards	2021	Major Tour of the Year	Won	
Pollstar Awards	2021	Best Pop Tour	Nominated	
Pollstar Awards	2023	Major Tour of the Year	Won	
Pollstar Awards	2023	Brand Partnership/Live Campaign of the Year	Won	
Pollstar Awards	2023	Per Cap Award	Won	
Pollstar Awards	2023	Live Music is Better Award	Nominated	
Pollstar Awards	2023	Residency of the Year	Won	
Pollstar Awards	2023	Pop Tour of the Year	Nominated	
iHeartRadio Music Awards	2022	Tour of the Year	Won	
iHeartRadio Music Awards	2023	Favorite Residency	Won	
People's Choice Awards	2022	Concert Tour of 2022	Nominated	
Shorty Awards	2022	Social Media Campaign	Nominated	
Webby Awards	2022	Best Campaign - Entertainment & Performances	Nominated	
Webby Awards	2022	Best Campaign - Events & Livestreams	Won	

== Set list ==
This set list is representative of the show on 3 October 2021 in New York City. It does not represent all concerts for the tour.

1. "Golden"
2. "Carolina"
3. "Adore You"
4. "Only Angel"
5. "She"
6. "Two Ghosts / Falling"
7. "Sunflower Vol. 6"
8. "To Be So Lonely"
9. "Woman"
10. "Cherry"
11. "Lights Up"
12. "Canyon Moon"
13. "Treat People With Kindness"
14. "What Makes You Beautiful"
15. "Fine Line"

Encore

16. "Sign of the Times"
17. "Watermelon Sugar"
18. "Kiwi"

=== Additional notes ===
- Styles performed "Over the Rainbow" from The Wizard of Oz during the show in New York City on 30 October 2021.
- Styles performed "Toxic" by Britney Spears and "Medicine" during the show in New York City on 31 October 2021. Styles performed Medicine during select dates throughout the tour.
- Beginning on the 11 June 2022 show in Glasgow, Styles added "Music for a Sushi Restaurant", "Daylight", "Cinema", "Keep Driving", "Matilda", "Boyfriends", "Satellite", "Late Night Talking", "Love of My Life" and "As It Was" to the set list; he removed "Carolina", "Only Angel", "She", "Two Ghosts", "Falling", "Sunflower Vol. 6", "To Be So Lonely", "Woman" and "Cherry".
- Styles performed "Hopelessly Devoted to You" from Grease during the show in Inglewood on 31 October 2022. He did so to honor Olivia Newton-John, who played the role of Sandy Olsson in the film.
- On 1 December 2022, Styles performed "Songbird" as a tribute to Christine McVie.
- Styles performed "The Horses" by Daryl Braithwaite during the show in Perth on 20 February 2023 and the show in Melbourne on 25 February 2023. Braithwaite joined Styles for a surprise performance during the show in Sydney on 4 March of the same year.
- Beginning with the show in Horsens on 13 May 2023, Styles performed "Grapejuice" and "Stockholm Syndrome".
- On the final show, 22 July 2023 in Reggio Emilia, Styles performed a 10-minute instrumental piece he had written.

== Tour dates ==
List of 2021 concerts
Date (2021)	City	Country	Venue	Opening acts	Attendance	Revenue
4 September	Paradise (Note: Labeled as Las Vegas in promotional material.)	United States	MGM Grand Garden Arena	Jenny Lewis	13,413 / 13,413	$1,686,284
7 September	Denver	United States	Ball Arena	Jenny Lewis	17,347 / 17,347	$1,863,008
9 September	San Antonio	United States	AT&T Center	Jenny Lewis	17,298 / 17,298	$2,131,207
11 September	Dallas	United States	American Airlines Center	Jenny Lewis	17,682 / 17,682	$2,193,709
15 September	St. Louis	United States	Enterprise Center	Jenny Lewis	17,171 / 17,171	$2,745,557
17 September	Philadelphia	United States	Wells Fargo Center	Jenny Lewis	18,995 / 18,995	$2,319,947
18 September	Washington, D.C.	United States	Capital One Arena	Jenny Lewis	18,903 / 18,903	$2,753,018
20 September	Detroit	United States	Little Caesars Arena	Jenny Lewis	18,204 / 18,204	$2,281,394
22 September	Saint Paul	United States	Xcel Energy Center	Jenny Lewis	18,114 / 18,114	$2,241,288
24 September	Chicago	United States	United Center	Jenny Lewis	39,387 / 39,387	$4,750,594
25 September	Chicago	United States	United Center	Jenny Lewis	39,387 / 39,387	$4,750,594
29 September	Nashville	United States	Bridgestone Arena	Jenny Lewis	32,627 / 32,627	$4,464,889
1 October	Nashville	United States	Bridgestone Arena	Jenny Lewis	32,627 / 32,627	$4,464,889
3 October	New York City	United States	Madison Square Garden	Jenny Lewis	56,392 / 56,392 (Note: The box office data is representative of the three shows at Madison Square Garden on 3-4 and 16 October respectively.)	$8,099,555
4 October	New York City	United States	Madison Square Garden	Jenny Lewis	56,392 / 56,392	$8,099,555
7 October	Orlando	United States	Amway Center	Jenny Lewis	16,898 / 16,898	$1,904,939
8 October	Sunrise	United States	FLA Live Arena	Jenny Lewis	18,176 / 18,176	$2,350,545
10 October	Tampa	United States	Amalie Arena	Jenny Lewis	18,183 / 18,183	$2,029,171
12 October	Raleigh	United States	PNC Arena	Jenny Lewis	18,616 / 18,616	$2,238,542
14 October	Pittsburgh	United States	PPG Paints Arena	Jenny Lewis	18,369 / 18,369	$2,137,752
16 October	New York City	United States	Madison Square Garden	Jenny Lewis		
18 October	Cleveland	United States	Rocket Mortgage FieldHouse	Jenny Lewis	17,786 / 17,786	$2,197,690
21 October	Uncasville	United States	Mohegan Sun Arena	Jenny Lewis	18,159 / 18,159	$2,165,968
23 October	Uncasville	United States	Mohegan Sun Arena	Jenny Lewis	18,159 / 18,159	$2,165,968
25 October	Boston	United States	TD Garden	Jenny Lewis	16,743 / 16,743	$2,306,243
27 October	Atlanta	United States	State Farm Arena	Jenny Lewis	31,146 / 31,146	$4,146,897
28 October	Atlanta	United States	State Farm Arena	Jenny Lewis	31,146 / 31,146	$4,146,897
30 October	New York City	United States	Madison Square Garden	Madison Cunningham; Orville Peck	37,321 / 37,321	$5,714,220
31 October	New York City	United States	Madison Square Garden	Madison Cunningham; Orville Peck	37,321 / 37,321	$5,714,220
3 November	Milwaukee	United States	Fiserv Forum	Jenny Lewis	16,881 / 16,881	$2,312,794
7 November	Tacoma	United States	Tacoma Dome	Jenny Lewis	21,469 / 21,469	$2,746,176
8 November	Portland	United States	Moda Center	Jenny Lewis	17,890 / 17,890	$2,125,697
10 November	Sacramento	United States	Golden 1 Center	Jenny Lewis	16,745 / 16,745	$2,292,473
11 November	San Jose	United States	SAP Center	Jenny Lewis	17,823 / 17,823	$2,244,533
13 November	Glendale	United States	Gila River Arena	Jenny Lewis	16,846 / 16,846	$2,036,487
15 November	San Diego	United States	Pechanga Arena	Jenny Lewis	13,728 / 13,728	$1,641,218
17 November	Inglewood (Note: Labeled as Los Angeles in promotional material.)	United States	The Forum	Jenny Lewis	50,739 / 50,739	$6,602,191
19 November	Inglewood	United States	The Forum	Jenny Lewis	50,739 / 50,739	$6,602,191
20 November	Inglewood	United States	The Forum	Jenny Lewis	50,739 / 50,739	$6,602,191
23 November (Note: Originally set to take place on 13 September 2021, but was rescheduled due to Tropical Storm Nicholas.)	Houston	United States	Toyota Center	—N/a	16,541 / 16,541	$2,171,475
24 November	North Little Rock	United States	Simmons Bank Arena	—N/a	16,691 / 16,691	$2,525,863
28 November	Elmont	United States	UBS Arena	—N/a	16,777 / 16,777	$3,272,836

List of 2022 concerts
Date (2022)	City	Country	Venue	Opening acts	Attendance	Revenue
11 June	Glasgow	Scotland	Ibrox Stadium	Mitski	43,637 / 43,637	$4,229,885
15 June	Manchester	England	Emirates Old Trafford	Mitski	99,526 / 99,526	$9,179,139
16 June	Manchester	England	Emirates Old Trafford	Mitski	99,526 / 99,526	$9,179,139
18 June	London	England	Wembley Stadium	Mitski	147,269 / 147,269	$14,479,293
19 June	London	England	Wembley Stadium	Mitski	147,269 / 147,269	$14,479,293
22 June	Dublin	Ireland	Aviva Stadium	Arlo Parks	50,422 / 50,422	$5,006,395
26 June	Hamburg	Germany	Volksparkstadion	Wolf Alice	42,192 / 42,192	$3,494,578
29 June	Stockholm	Sweden	Tele2 Arena	Wolf Alice	36,282 / 36,282	$3,068,314
1 July	Oslo	Norway	Telenor Arena	Wolf Alice	23,784 / 23,784	$2,089,269
5 July	Paris	France	Accor Arena	Wolf Alice	14,598 / 14,598	$1,030,721
7 July	Antwerp	Belgium	Sportpaleis	Wolf Alice	18,245 / 18,245	$1,207,376
9 July	Amsterdam	Netherlands	Ziggo Dome	Wolf Alice	13,080 / 13,080	$1,056,199
11 July	Munich	Germany	Olympiahalle	Wolf Alice	13,027 / 13,027	$991,358
13 July	Budapest	Hungary	Budapest Sports Arena	Wolf Alice	12,070 / 12,070	$788,891
15 July	Prague	Czech Republic	O_{2} Arena	Wolf Alice	15,616 / 15,616	$1,069,985
16 July	Vienna	Austria	Wiener Stadthalle	Wolf Alice	10,910 / 10,910	$811,841
18 July	Kraków	Poland	Tauron Arena	Wolf Alice	15,158 / 15,158	$1,654,068
20 July	Berlin	Germany	Mercedes-Benz Arena	Wolf Alice	12,853 / 12,853	$1,026,787
22 July	Cologne	Germany	Lanxess Arena	Wolf Alice	16,069 / 16,069	$1,211,191
25 July	Bologna	Italy	Unipol Arena	Wolf Alice	12,699 / 12,699	$912,467
26 July	Turin	Italy	Pala Alpitour	Wolf Alice	14,513 / 14,513	$923,185
29 July	Madrid	Spain	WiZink Center	Wolf Alice	13,990 / 13,990	$964,164
31 July	Lisbon	Portugal	Altice Arena	Wolf Alice	12,671 / 12,671	$747,179
15 August	Toronto	Canada	Scotiabank Arena	Madi Diaz	36,607 / 36,607	$6,864,299
16 August	Toronto	Canada	Scotiabank Arena	Madi Diaz	36,607 / 36,607	$6,864,299
20 August	New York City	United States	Madison Square Garden	Blood Orange	276,852 / 276,852	$63,102,676
21 August	New York City	United States	Madison Square Garden	Blood Orange	276,852 / 276,852	$63,102,676
22 August	New York City	United States	Madison Square Garden	Blood Orange	276,852 / 276,852	$63,102,676
26 August	New York City	United States	Madison Square Garden	Blood Orange	276,852 / 276,852	$63,102,676
27 August	New York City	United States	Madison Square Garden	Blood Orange	276,852 / 276,852	$63,102,676
28 August	New York City	United States	Madison Square Garden	Blood Orange	276,852 / 276,852	$63,102,676
1 September	New York City	United States	Madison Square Garden	Blood Orange	276,852 / 276,852	$63,102,676
2 September	New York City	United States	Madison Square Garden	Blood Orange	276,852 / 276,852	$63,102,676
3 September	New York City	United States	Madison Square Garden	Blood Orange	276,852 / 276,852	$63,102,676
7 September	New York City	United States	Madison Square Garden	Blood Orange	276,852 / 276,852	$63,102,676
8 September	New York City	United States	Madison Square Garden	Blood Orange	276,852 / 276,852	$63,102,676
10 September	New York City	United States	Madison Square Garden	Blood Orange	276,852 / 276,852	$63,102,676
14 September	New York City	United States	Madison Square Garden	Blood Orange	276,852 / 276,852	$63,102,676
15 September	New York City	United States	Madison Square Garden	Blood Orange	276,852 / 276,852	$63,102,676
21 September	New York City	United States	Madison Square Garden	Blood Orange	276,852 / 276,852	$63,102,676
25 September	Austin	United States	Moody Center	Gabriels	86,056 / 86,056	$19,175,231
26 September	Austin	United States	Moody Center	Gabriels	86,056 / 86,056	$19,175,231
28 September	Austin	United States	Moody Center	Gabriels	86,056 / 86,056	$19,175,231
29 September	Austin	United States	Moody Center	Gabriels	86,056 / 86,056	$19,175,231
2 October	Austin	United States	Moody Center	Gabriels	86,056 / 86,056	$19,175,231
3 October	Austin	United States	Moody Center	Gabriels	86,056 / 86,056	$19,175,231
8 October	Chicago	United States	United Center	Jessie Ware	112,400 / 112,400	$20,358,593
9 October	Chicago	United States	United Center	Jessie Ware	112,400 / 112,400	$20,358,593
10 October (Note: Originally set to take place on 6 October 2022, but was rescheduled due to band/crew illness.)	Chicago	United States	United Center	Jessie Ware	112,400 / 112,400	$20,358,593
13 October	Chicago	United States	United Center	Jessie Ware	112,400 / 112,400	$20,358,593
14 October	Chicago	United States	United Center	Jessie Ware	112,400 / 112,400	$20,358,593
15 October	Chicago	United States	United Center	Jessie Ware	112,400 / 112,400	$20,358,593
23 October	Inglewood	United States	Kia Forum	Ben Harper	204,916 / 204,916	$38,132,528
24 October	Inglewood	United States	Kia Forum	Ben Harper	204,916 / 204,916	$38,132,528
26 October	Inglewood	United States	Kia Forum	Ben Harper	204,916 / 204,916	$38,132,528
28 October	Inglewood	United States	Kia Forum	Ben Harper	204,916 / 204,916	$38,132,528
29 October	Inglewood	United States	Kia Forum	Ben Harper	204,916 / 204,916	$38,132,528
31 October	Inglewood	United States	Kia Forum	Ben Harper	204,916 / 204,916	$38,132,528
2 November	Inglewood	United States	Kia Forum	Ben Harper	204,916 / 204,916	$38,132,528
9 November	Inglewood	United States	Kia Forum	Ben Harper	204,916 / 204,916	$38,132,528
11 November	Inglewood	United States	Kia Forum	Ben Harper	204,916 / 204,916	$38,132,528
12 November	Inglewood	United States	Kia Forum	Ben Harper	204,916 / 204,916	$38,132,528
14 November	Inglewood	United States	Kia Forum	Ben Harper	204,916 / 204,916	$38,132,528
15 November	Inglewood	United States	Kia Forum	Ben Harper	204,916 / 204,916	$38,132,528
20 November	Guadalajara	Mexico	Arena VFG	Koffee	12,812 / 12,812	$1,116,186
22 November	Monterrey	Mexico	Arena Monterrey	Koffee	11,316 / 11,316	$832,767
24 November	Mexico City	Mexico	Foro Sol	Koffee	117,363 / 117,363	$7,563,097
25 November	Mexico City	Mexico	Foro Sol	Koffee	117,363 / 117,363	$7,563,097
27 November (Note: The concert on 27 November 2022 in Bogotá was originally scheduled on 8 October 2020 at Movistar Arena, but it was rescheduled and moved the Salitre Mágico, and then was moved again to Coliseo Live.)	Cota (Note: Labeled as Bogotá in promotional material.)	Colombia	Coliseo Live	Koffee	19,933 / 19,933	$1,418,653
29 November (Note: The concert on 29 November 2022 in Lima was originally scheduled at the Jockey Club del Perú, but it was rescheduled and moved to the National Stadium.)	Lima	Peru	Estadio Nacional	Koffee	40,927 / 40,927	$3,006,682
1 December (Note: The concert on 1 December 2022 in Santiago was originally scheduled on 14 October 2020 at the Movistar Arena, but it was rescheduled and moved to the Estadio Bicentenario de La Florida.)	Santiago	Chile	Estadio Bicentenario de La Florida	DJ Kamila Govorčin; Koffee	25,505 / 25,505	$1,795,373
3 December	Buenos Aires	Argentina	Estadio River Plate	Koffee; Anita B Queen	123,942 / 123,942	$8,966,109
4 December	Buenos Aires	Argentina	Estadio River Plate	Koffee; Anita B Queen	123,942 / 123,942	$8,966,109
6 December	São Paulo	Brazil	Allianz Parque	Koffee	137,009 / 137,009 (Note: The box office data is representative of the three shows at Allianz Parque on 6 and 13–14 December respectively.)	$11,113,075
8 December	Rio de Janeiro	Brazil	Jeunesse Arena (Note: The show took place on a stage outside Jeunesse Arena.)	Koffee	33,260 / 33,260	$2,362,813
10 December	Curitiba	Brazil	Pedreira Paulo Leminski	Koffee	23,466 / 23,466	$2,268,067
13 December	São Paulo	Brazil	Allianz Parque	Koffee		
14 December	São Paulo	Brazil	Allianz Parque	Koffee		

List of 2023 concerts
Date (2023)	City	Country	Venue	Opening acts	Attendance	Revenue
26 January (Note: Originally set to take place on 5 November 2022, but was rescheduled due to Styles having the flu.)	Inglewood	United States	Kia Forum	Wet Leg	51,342 / 51,342	$9,623,023
27 January (Note: Originally set to take place on 4 November 2022, but was rescheduled to 6 November 2022 due to band/crew illness. It was then rescheduled again due to Styles having the flu.)	Inglewood	United States	Kia Forum	Wet Leg	51,342 / 51,342	$9,623,023
29 January (Note: Originally set to take place on 7 November 2022, but was rescheduled due to Styles having the flu.)	Inglewood	United States	Kia Forum	Wet Leg	51,342 / 51,342	$9,623,023
31 January	Thousand Palms	United States	Acrisure Arena	Madi Diaz	20,939 / 20,939	$5,577,876
1 February	Thousand Palms	United States	Acrisure Arena	Madi Diaz	20,939 / 20,939	$5,577,876
20 February	Perth	Australia	HBF Park	Wet Leg	30,849 / 30,849	$4,409,981
24 February	Melbourne	Australia	Marvel Stadium	Wet Leg	114,616 / 114,616	$15,042,107
25 February	Melbourne	Australia	Marvel Stadium	Wet Leg	114,616 / 114,616	$15,042,107
28 February	Gold Coast	Australia	Metricon Stadium	Wet Leg	48,177 / 48,177	$6,550,585
3 March	Sydney	Australia	Accor Stadium	Wet Leg	137,443 / 137,443	$16,445,460
4 March	Sydney	Australia	Accor Stadium	Wet Leg	137,443 / 137,443	$16,445,460
7 March	Auckland	New Zealand	Mount Smart Stadium	Ny Oh; Wet Leg	41,979 / 41,979	$5,111,127
11 March	Bangkok	Thailand	Rajamangala Stadium	—	27,492 / 27,492	$2,860,607
14 March	Bocaue	Philippines	Philippine Arena	—	29,247 / 29,247	$3,337,289
17 March	Singapore		National Stadium	—	25,654 / 25,654	$4,696,429
20 March	Seoul	South Korea	KSPO Dome	—	15,314 / 15,314	$1,949,014
24 March	Tokyo	Japan	Ariake Arena	—	24,325 / 24,325	$3,274,769
25 March	Tokyo	Japan	Ariake Arena	—	24,325 / 24,325	$3,274,769
13 May	Horsens	Denmark	CASA Arena Horsens	Wet Leg	—	—
14 May	Horsens	Denmark	CASA Arena Horsens	Wet Leg	—	—
17 May	Munich	Germany	Olympiastadion	Wet Leg	120,877 / 120,877	$12,496,890
18 May	Munich	Germany	Olympiastadion	Wet Leg	120,877 / 120,877	$12,496,890
22 May	Coventry	England	Coventry Building Society Arena	Wet Leg	72,026 / 72,026	$8,462,319
23 May	Coventry	England	Coventry Building Society Arena	Wet Leg	72,026 / 72,026	$8,462,319
26 May	Edinburgh	Scotland	BT Murrayfield Stadium	Wet Leg	128,838 / 128,838	$14,335,817
27 May	Edinburgh	Scotland	BT Murrayfield Stadium	Wet Leg	128,838 / 128,838	$14,335,817
1 June	Saint-Denis (Note: Labeled as Paris in promotional material.)	France	Stade de France	Wet Leg	132,880 / 132,880	$14,079,140
2 June	Saint-Denis	France	Stade de France	Wet Leg	132,880 / 132,880	$14,079,140
4 June	Amsterdam	Netherlands	Johan Cruijff Arena	Wet Leg	154,903 / 154,903	$16,498,991
5 June	Amsterdam	Netherlands	Johan Cruijff Arena	Wet Leg	154,903 / 154,903	$16,498,991
6 June	Amsterdam	Netherlands	Johan Cruijff Arena	Wet Leg	154,903 / 154,903	$16,498,991
10 June (Note: The concert on 10 June 2023 is part of the Slane Festival.)	Slane	Ireland	Slane Castle	Inhaler; Annie Mac; Mitch Rowland; Wet Leg	83,310 / 83,310	$10,367,213
13 June	London	England	Wembley Stadium	Madi Diaz; Wet Leg	335,394 / 335,394	$37,341,665
14 June	London	England	Wembley Stadium	Ariza; Elin; Wet Leg	335,394 / 335,394	$37,341,665
16 June	London	England	Wembley Stadium	Mitch Rowland; Wet Leg	335,394 / 335,394	$37,341,665
17 June	London	England	Wembley Stadium	Pauli the PSM; Wet Leg; Yaffra	335,394 / 335,394	$37,341,665
20 June	Cardiff	Wales	Principality Stadium	Wet Leg	115,047 / 115,047	$12,519,389
21 June	Cardiff	Wales	Principality Stadium	Wet Leg	115,047 / 115,047	$12,519,389
24 June	Werchter	Belgium	Werchter Festival Ground	Wet Leg	—	—
27 June	Düsseldorf	Germany	Merkur Spiel-Arena	Wet Leg	84,580 / 84,580	$9,808,564
28 June	Düsseldorf	Germany	Merkur Spiel-Arena	Wet Leg	84,580 / 84,580	$9,808,564
2 July	Warsaw	Poland	PGE Narodowy	Wet Leg	—	—
5 July	Frankfurt	Germany	Deutsche Bank Park	Wet Leg	90,976 / 90,976	$9,834,218
6 July	Frankfurt	Germany	Deutsche Bank Park	Wet Leg	90,976 / 90,976	$9,834,218
8 July	Vienna	Austria	Ernst-Happel-Stadion	Wet Leg	—	—
12 July	Barcelona	Spain	Estadi Olímpic Lluís Companys	Wet Leg	—	—
14 July	Madrid	Spain	Nuevo Espacio Mad Cool	Wet Leg	—	—
18 July	Lisbon	Portugal	Passeio Marítimo de Algés	Wet Leg	—	—
22 July	Reggio Emilia	Italy	RCF Arena	Wet Leg	—	—
Total					4,506,243 / 4,506,243 (100%)	$563,321,605

== Cancelled shows ==
List of cancelled concerts
Date	City	Country	Venue	Reason
15 April 2020	Birmingham	England	Utilita Arena	COVID-19 pandemic
17 April 2020	Sheffield	England	Utilita Arena	COVID-19 pandemic
30 March 2021	Moscow	Russia	Megasport Sport Palace	COVID-19 pandemic
16 August 2021	Vancouver	Canada	Rogers Arena	COVID-19 pandemic
28 September 2021	Toronto	Canada	Scotiabank Arena	COVID-19 pandemic
29 September 2021	Toronto	Canada	Scotiabank Arena	COVID-19 pandemic
20 October 2021	Montreal	Canada	Bell Centre	COVID-19 pandemic
3 July 2022	Copenhagen	Denmark	Royal Arena	2022 Copenhagen mall shooting

== Personnel ==
Personnel adapted via Capital FM.

=== Band ===
- Yaffra – piano, keyboards, percussion
- Sarah Jones – drums, backing vocals
- Pauli Lovejoy – percussion, backing vocals
- Ny Oh – piano, keyboards, rhythm guitar, theremin, backing vocals
- Mitch Rowland – lead guitar, backing vocals
- Elin Sandberg – bass, backing vocals
- Ariza - guitar, keyboard, cello
- Madi Diaz - guitar, backing vocals

=== Brass section ===
- Laura Bibbs – trumpet
- Lorren Chiodo – saxophone
- Paris Fleming – trumpet
- Kalia Vandever – trombone

== See also ==
- Cultural impact of Harry Styles
- List of Billboard Boxscore number-one concert series of the 2020s
- List of highest-grossing concert series at a single venue
- List of highest-grossing concert tours
- List of most-attended concert series at a single venue
- List of most-attended concert tours
