= Medicine (Harry Styles song) =

2018 song by Harry Styles

Song by Harry Styles
- Genre: Rock; pop
- Songwriters: Harry Styles; Tyler Johnson; Mitch Rowland; Alex Saliban

"Medicine" is an unreleased song by English singer-songwriter Harry Styles. It was first performed during Harry Styles: Live on Tour in Basel, Switzerland on 11 March 2018. Written with collaborators Tyler Johnson, Mitch Rowland, and Alex Saliban. Styles originally intended to include the song on his self-titled debut album, but discarded it because he felt it sounded too similar to other songs on the album. Styles said that the song did not appear on Fine Line or Harry's House because even though he finds it "very fun to play live", he feels that "sonically it's just not really where [he's] at anymore". Despite this, he has stated he is still open to possibly releasing it at a later date.

== Themes and lyrics ==
"Medicine" addresses themes of sexual fluidity and experimentation. The lyric, "The boys and the girls are in/I mess around with him/And I'm OK with it!" sparked extensive speculation about Styles' sexuality from both fans and critics. Fans dubbed "Medicine" a "bisexual anthem". Owen Myers from The Guardian called it "an important moment for some bisexual music lovers, unaccustomed to seeing their own experiences mirrored in arena-filling pop songs." The song has been seen by some critics as part of a wider trend of accepting bisexuality and expressions of sexual fluidity in popular music. Annie Lord from Dazed magazine noted the aesthetic similarities between the "electric blue and magenta pink lights" Styles uses for his performances of "Medicine" (dubbed bisexual lighting within the queer community) with the colour palette pansexual singer Janelle Monáe used in her video for "Make Me Feel".

When noted in an interview with radio personality Howard Stern that fans seem to feel the song is "an anthem for fans who are thinking about coming out", Styles said, "It's definitely about feeling like there's a space where people feel safe enough to kind of share, have those big moments and share them with a room full of people."

== Notable appearances ==
Styles debuted Medicine in Basel, Switzerland on 11 March 2018. While it was common for Styles to play "Medicine" during Live on Tour in 2018, it is no longer a permanent feature of his set list. Styles played "Medicine" at his second night of Harryween Fancy Dress Party on 31 October 2021. He also played "Medicine" at his second night headlining Coachella. On 20 April 2022, the studio version of "Medicine" leaked online. Styles performed "Medicine" on select nights during his Love on Tour 2022 residency shows in New York; Austin; Chicago; LA; and North Little Rock, Arkansas; also in Brazil, on the last concert of the year, in São Paulo and New Zealand. Most recently Harry performed Medicine in Sydney, Australia on night 1 on 3 March 2023, Coventry, UK on 23 May 2023 and also in Edinburgh, Scotland on night 2 at Murrayfield Stadium (27 May 2023). He also played it in Paris, France on 2 June 2023, London, UK on 13th,16th and 17 June as well as in Düsseldorf, Germany on night 2 (28 June 2023) in Warsaw, Poland (2 July 2023), in Frankfurt, Germany (5 July 2023), in Barcelona, Spain (12 July 2023), in Madrid, Spain (14 July 2023), in Lisbon, Portugal (18 July 2023) and in Reggio Emilia, Italy (22 July 2023).

== Critical reception ==
Reviews of "Medicine" have been favourable. Rob Sheffield of Rolling Stone described "Medicine" as "a depraved, sex-crazed Stones-y rock & roll strut", "a song that fans light candles and pray for", and ranked it number 10 on his list of every Harry Styles song ever written. Lilly Pace of Billboard described the song as an "LGBTQ anthem", "a crowd favorite" and, prior to the release of Fine Line, said it was on her "wish list" for his second album. Melissa Ruggieri for The Atlanta Journal-Constitution said it was "a meaty rocker". David Lindquist from The Indianapolis Star called it "a raw-power ode to giving in to pleasure".
