= Harry Styles: Live on Tour =

2017–18 global concert tour

Harry Styles – ʟɪᴠᴇ ᴏɴ ᴛᴏᴜʀ
- World tour by Harry Styles
- Location: North America • Europe • Oceania • South America • Asia
- Associated album: Harry Styles
- Start date: 19 September 2017
- End date: 14 July 2018
- Legs: 9
- No. of shows: 89
- Supporting acts: Muna; Kacey Musgraves; Mabel; Leon Bridges; Warpaint; The Preatures; Maddy Jane; Cam
- Box office: $63,103,783 (80 dates)

Harry Styles concert chronology
- Harry Styles: Live on Tour (2017–2018); Love On Tour (2021–2023)

Harry Styles – Live on Tour (stylized as Harry Styles – ʟɪᴠᴇ ᴏɴ ᴛᴏᴜʀ) was the first worldwide concert tour by English singer Harry Styles in support of his self-titled debut album (2017). The tour was announced on 28 April 2017 and additional dates were added on 8 June. The two-part tour began with intimate venues in 2017 and continued on to arenas in 2018. The tour started on 19 September 2017 in San Francisco and concluded on 14 July 2018 in Inglewood, comprising 89 shows.

== Background ==
In June 2016, it was confirmed that Styles had signed a recording contract as a solo artist with Columbia Records. In April 2017, Styles released his debut single, "Sign of the Times", and his self-titled debut album on 12 May 2017.

The tour dates for 2017 were announced on 28 April 2017 via Twitter and his website. Tickets went on sale on 5 May. The tour was sold-out in seconds due to the relatively small sizes of the venues. Styles elected to play smaller venues for his first shows to allow fans the opportunity for a more intimate live experience. On 6 June, MUNA was announced as the supporting act for his 2017 North American and European dates. On 8 June, Styles added 56 new dates in Europe, Asia, Australia, Latin America, and North America for 2018, revisiting many of the previous stops and playing larger venues. The opening acts for the tour were announced the same day, with Kacey Musgraves in the U.S. and Canada, Warpaint in Asia, and Leon Bridges in Latin America. Due to high demand, additional seats were added in a 360 setup for the North American stops in 2018. On 29 November, Mabel and The Preatures were announced as the opening acts for Europe and Australia respectively. Styles exclusively wore custom Gucci designed by Alessandro Michele for his stage outfits in 2017. In addition to Gucci, Styles also wore custom Calvin Klein 205W39NYC designed by Raf Simons, as well as Alexander McQueen, Harris Reed, Givenchy, and Saint Laurent outfits on tour in 2018.

== Critical reception ==
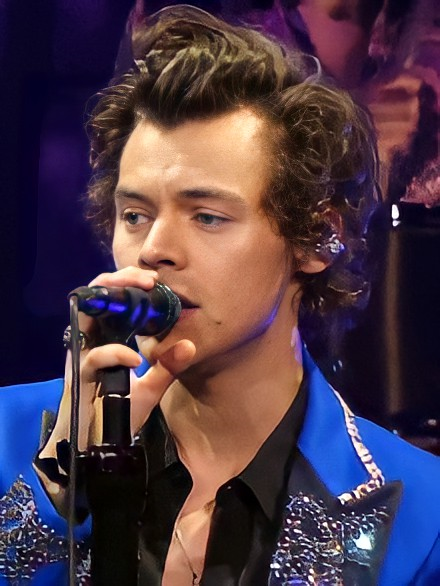
Styles performing in Nashville, Tennessee in June 2018

Eve Barlow of Billboard stated, "He was made to be the frontman. [...] His Jagger-meets-David Cassidy persona shines out on the swaggering "Only Angel" and "Woman". Rob Sheffield of Rolling Stone marvelled at Styles' "ugly enthusiasm", writing, "A year into his solo rebirth, he's earned his stripes as a master of every rock & roll move, wearing the tradition like it's a coat he had tailored just for him." Sheffield continued that Styles is "the ultimate fusion of Mick Jagger’s yin and Paul McCartney’s yang [...] to the point where encountering them at peak strength in the same star can get bewildering". Writing for Los Angeles Times, August Brown lauded the show as "one of the best arena rock shows of the last few years", taking particular note of the stage production which was "classy and minimal, relying on the strength of the songs and Styles’ charm as a live performer." Sabrina Barr of The Independent praised Styles for his "undeniably impressive vocal range", adding, "Most performers can only dream of having the charisma and star quality that Harry Styles naturally exudes."

The Irish Times's Louise Bruton wrote that Styles "proves his superstar status easily but he maintains a sincere level of modesty throughout the entire show, making him more personable than a lot of his pop star peers", and praised his vocals on slower songs, calling him "very much in a league of his own". Matt Miller of Esquire complimented Styles' sensitivity in regards to inclusivity ("aggressively inclusive" according to Rolling Stone) after seeing "teens carrying rainbow hats, shirts, and even one pride flag attached to a Black Lives Matter sign in the front row", saying "[Styles reminds] us that youths are here, they're aware, and they actually care."

== Commercial performance ==
According to Billboard, tickets for the 2017 shows sold out in seconds across 29 markets. Globe’s pre-sale for the concert at Mall of Asia Arena in Manila broke Coldplay’s record of six minutes by selling out in 52 seconds. The second of the two final shows at The Forum in Inglewood, California, tallied more than 17,000 paid tickets and beat the record for the most paid tickets for a single show since the venue reopened in 2014. Additionally, record amounts of merchandise were sold in over 50 venues in North and South America, Australia, and Europe, according to Live Nation.

Pollstar's 2018 Mid-Year report ranked the tour at No. 13 on the Top 100 Worldwide Tours list and No. 20 on Top 100 North American Tours list in terms of gross, and No. 8 on Top 100 Tours list for number of tickets sold worldwide. Styles was the third top-selling touring act of Summer 2018 in the U.S., fifth in Canada and Argentina, and eighth in Brazil on StubHub.

== Philanthropy ==
The tour raised a total of $1.2 million in charity donations from ticket and merchandise sales for 62 charities around the world, and registered hundreds of new voters in the U.S. via the non-profit organisation HeadCount. Styles also partnered with the environmental non-profit Reverb, and engaged in a major effort for water conservation that saved the equivalent of 10,000 single-use water bottles by fans, and 3,200 by the band and crew, and recycled more than 6,500 gallons of water from buses, offices, dressing rooms and other backstage areas. Styles released two T-shirts in celebration of Pride, with his phrase, 'Treat People With Kindness' as well as all proceeds going to support GLSEN's work ensuring safe and inclusive schools for LGBTQ youth.

== Set list ==
=== 2017 ===
This set list is representative of the show on 19 September 2017 in San Francisco. It is not intended to represent all concerts for the 2017 tour.

1. "Ever Since New York"
2. "Two Ghosts"
3. "Carolina"
4. "Stockholm Syndrome"
5. "Sweet Creature"
6. "Only Angel"
7. "Woman"
8. "Meet Me in the Hallway"
9. "Just a Little Bit of Your Heart"
10. "What Makes You Beautiful"
11. "Kiwi"

Encore

1. "From the Dining Table"
2. "The Chain"
3. "Sign of the Times"

=== 2018 ===
This set list is representative of the show on 11 March 2018 in Basel. It is not intended to represent all concerts for the 2018 tour.

1. "Only Angel"
2. "Woman"
3. "Ever Since New York"
4. "Two Ghosts"
5. "Carolina"
6. "Stockholm Syndrome"
7. "Just a Little Bit of Your Heart"
8. "Medicine"
9. "Meet Me in the Hallway"
10. "Sweet Creature"
11. "If I Could Fly"
12. "Anna"
13. "What Makes You Beautiful"
14. "Sign of the Times"

Encore

1. "From the Dining Table"
2. "The Chain"
3. "Kiwi"

=== Notes ===
- Styles performed "Girl Crush" by Little Big Town during the show in Nashville and the second show in Tokyo in 2017.
- Styles performed "Story of My Life" by One Direction during his 2017 shows in New York City, Boston, Washington D.C., Atlanta, and Dallas.
- Kacey Musgraves appeared on stage to perform "You're Still the One" by Shania Twain with Styles during his 22 June 2018 concert in New York City.
- Styles performed "Girl Crush" by Little Big Town, and the final song "Kiwi" three consecutive times during the last show of the tour in Inglewood.

== Shows ==
Date	City	Country	Venue	Opening acts	Attendance	Revenue
North America
19 September 2017	San Francisco	United States	SF Masonic Auditorium	Muna	3,188 / 3,198	$199,408
20 September 2017	Los Angeles	United States	Greek Theatre	Muna	5,727 / 5,867	$380,961
25 September 2017	Nashville	United States	Ryman Auditorium	Muna; Cam	2,302 / 2,362	$142,624
26 September 2017	Chicago	United States	Chicago Theatre	Muna	3,553 / 3,553	$297,764
28 September 2017	New York City	United States	Radio City Music Hall	Muna	5,942 / 5,942	$501,793
30 September 2017	Boston	United States	Wang Theatre	Muna	3,531 / 3,531	$259,878
1 October 2017	Washington, D.C.	United States	DAR Constitution Hall	Muna	3,186 / 3,287	$221,005
4 October 2017	Toronto	Canada	Massey Hall	Muna	—N/a	—N/a
5 October 2017	Upper Darby	United States	Tower Theater	Muna	—N/a	—N/a
8 October 2017	Atlanta	United States	Coca-Cola Roxy Theatre	Muna	—N/a	—N/a
10 October 2017	Irving	United States	The Pavilion	Muna	4,077 / 4,077	$289,072
11 October 2017	Austin	United States	Moody Theater	Muna	2,622 / 2,646	$205,129
14 October 2017	Phoenix	United States	Comerica Theatre	Muna	—N/a	—N/a
Europe
25 October 2017	Paris	France	Olympia	Muna	—N/a	—N/a
27 October 2017	Cologne	Germany	Palladium	Muna	—N/a	—N/a
29 October 2017	London	England	Eventim Apollo	Muna	10,375 / 13,589	$635,398
30 October 2017	London	England	Eventim Apollo	Muna	10,375 / 13,589	$635,398
1 November 2017	Manchester	England	O_{2} Apollo Manchester	Muna	—N/a	—N/a
2 November 2017	Glasgow	Scotland	SEC Armadillo	Muna	2,919 / 2,919	$179,580
5 November 2017	Stockholm	Sweden	Fryshuset	Muna	—N/a	—N/a
7 November 2017	Berlin	Germany	Tempodrom	Muna	3,546 / 3,549	$256,146
8 November 2017	Amsterdam	Netherlands	AFAS Live	Muna	5,974 / 5,974	$340,762
10 November 2017	Milan	Italy	Discoteca Alcatraz	Muna	—N/a	—N/a
Asia
19 November 2017	Shanghai	China	Mercedes-Benz Arena	—N/a	—N/a	—N/a
23 November 2017	Singapore		The Star Performing Arts Centre	—N/a	4,862 / 4,862	$424,718
Oceania
26 November 2017	Sydney	Australia	Enmore Theatre	Maddy Jane	2,446 / 2,446	$210,708
30 November 2017	Melbourne	Australia	Forum Theatre	Maddy Jane	1,973 / 1,973	$164,929
2 December 2017	Auckland	New Zealand	Spark Arena	Maddy Jane	7,575 / 8,787	$525,464
Asia
7 December 2017	Tokyo	Japan	Ex Theater Roppongi	—N/a	3,600 / 3,600	$290,787
8 December 2017	Tokyo	Japan	Ex Theater Roppongi	—N/a	3,600 / 3,600	$290,787
Europe
11 March 2018	Basel	Switzerland	St. Jakobshalle	Mabel	6,725 / 6,725	$560,383
13 March 2018	Paris	France	AccorHotels Arena	Mabel	12,422 / 13,811	$859,867
14 March 2018	Amsterdam	Netherlands	Ziggo Dome	Mabel	13,105 / 13,105	$916,022
16 March 2018	Antwerp	Belgium	Sportpaleis	Mabel	12,156 / 12,156	$856,747
18 March 2018	Stockholm	Sweden	Ericsson Globe	Mabel	8,578 / 8,578	$711,071
19 March 2018	Copenhagen	Denmark	Royal Arena	Mabel	10,580 / 10,580	$971,088
21 March 2018	Oslo	Norway	Oslo Spektrum	Mabel	9,307 / 9,307	$653,261
24 March 2018	Oberhausen	Germany	König Pilsener Arena	Mabel	10,591 / 10,814	$717,474
25 March 2018	Hamburg	Germany	Barclaycard Arena	Mabel	10,422 / 11,894	$755,658
27 March 2018	Munich	Germany	Olympiahalle	Mabel	11,267 / 11,267	$801,337
30 March 2018	Barcelona	Spain	Palau Sant Jordi	Mabel	10,338 / 10,338	$729,427
31 March 2018	Madrid	Spain	WiZink Center	Mabel	12,108 / 12,108	$882,525
2 April 2018	Milan	Italy	Mediolanum Forum	Mabel	10,374 / 10,374	$741,138
4 April 2018	Bologna	Italy	Unipol Arena	Mabel	12,660 / 12,660	$916,473
5 April 2018	Mannheim	Germany	SAP Arena	Mabel	9,015 / 9,015	$641,605
7 April 2018	Birmingham	England	Genting Arena	Mabel	12,771 / 12,771	$943,165
9 April 2018	Manchester	England	Manchester Arena	Mabel	13,478 / 13,478	$1,002,200
11 April 2018	London	England	The O_{2} Arena	Mabel	29,572 / 32,869	$2,088,620
12 April 2018	London	England	The O_{2} Arena	Mabel	29,572 / 32,869	$2,088,620
14 April 2018	Glasgow	Scotland	SSE Hydro	Mabel	10,546 / 10,546	$803,026
16 April 2018	Dublin	Ireland	3Arena	Mabel	12,612 / 12,612	$970,530
Oceania
21 April 2018	Perth	Australia	Perth Arena	The Preatures	9,256 / 9,256	$896,310
24 April 2018	Melbourne	Australia	Hisense Arena	The Preatures	8,929 / 8,929	$752,987
27 April 2018	Sydney	Australia	Qudos Bank Arena	The Preatures	14,263 / 14,532	$1,323,240
28 April 2018	Brisbane	Australia	Brisbane Entertainment Centre	The Preatures	10,658 / 10,658	$989,211
Asia
1 May 2018	Pasay	Philippines	Mall of Asia Arena	Warpaint	10,130 / 10,130	$747,330
3 May 2018	Singapore		Singapore Indoor Stadium	Warpaint	3,378 / 3,378	$490,952
5 May 2018	Hong Kong		HKCEC Hall 5BC	Warpaint	4,097 / 4,097	$501,478
7 May 2018	Bangkok	Thailand	Impact Arena	Warpaint	2,893 / 2,893	$352,604
10 May 2018	Kobe	Japan	World Memorial Hall	Warpaint	4,754 / 4,754	$616,143
12 May 2018	Chiba	Japan	Makuhari Event Hall	Warpaint	8,908 / 8,908	$1,078,067
South America
23 May 2018	Buenos Aires	Argentina	DirecTV Arena	Leon Bridges	9,523 / 9,523	$827,872
25 May 2018	Santiago	Chile	Movistar Arena	Leon Bridges	12,370 / 12,370	$1,140,297
27 May 2018	Rio de Janeiro	Brazil	Jeunesse Arena	Leon Bridges	12,244 / 12,244	$802,257
29 May 2018	São Paulo	Brazil	Espaço das Américas	Leon Bridges	7,200 / 7,200	$672,817
North America
1 June 2018	Mexico City	Mexico	Palacio de los Deportes	Leon Bridges	33,943 / 33,943	$1,962,719
2 June 2018	Mexico City	Mexico	Palacio de los Deportes	Leon Bridges	33,943 / 33,943	$1,962,719
5 June 2018	Dallas	United States	American Airlines Center	Kacey Musgraves	16,461 / 16,461	$1,306,002
7 June 2018	Houston	United States	Toyota Center	Kacey Musgraves	14,238 / 14,238	$1,163,261
9 June 2018	Sunrise	United States	BB&T Center	Kacey Musgraves	16,678 / 16,678	$1,302,904
11 June 2018	Duluth	United States	Infinite Energy Arena	Kacey Musgraves	12,007 / 12,007	$1,071,691
12 June 2018	Nashville	United States	Bridgestone Arena	Kacey Musgraves	18,543 / 18,543	$1,265,101
14 June 2018	Hershey	United States	Hersheypark Stadium	Kacey Musgraves	15,468 / 15,468	$1,111,493
15 June 2018	Philadelphia	United States	Wells Fargo Center	Kacey Musgraves	16,959 / 16,959	$1,370,303
16 June 2018	Toronto	Canada	Air Canada Centre	Kacey Musgraves	17,390 / 17,390	$1,391,932
18 June 2018	Boston	United States	TD Garden	Kacey Musgraves	16,146 / 16,146	$1,273,432
21 June 2018	New York City	United States	Madison Square Garden	Kacey Musgraves	36,353 / 36,353	$2,806,112
22 June 2018	New York City	United States	Madison Square Garden	Kacey Musgraves	36,353 / 36,353	$2,806,112
24 June 2018	Washington, D.C.	United States	Capital One Arena	Kacey Musgraves	15,894 / 15,894	$1,308,830
26 June 2018	Detroit	United States	Little Caesars Arena	Kacey Musgraves	15,894 / 15,894	$1,283,454
27 June 2018	Indianapolis	United States	Bankers Life Fieldhouse	Kacey Musgraves	15,566 / 15,566	$1,126,959
30 June 2018	Chicago	United States	United Center	Kacey Musgraves	18,286 / 18,286	$1,432,559
1 July 2018	Saint Paul	United States	Xcel Energy Center	Kacey Musgraves	16,914 / 16,914	$1,375,043
3 July 2018	Denver	United States	Pepsi Center	Kacey Musgraves	13,636 / 13,636	$1,097,362
6 July 2018	Vancouver	Canada	Rogers Arena	Kacey Musgraves	14,134 / 14,134	$1,105,785
7 July 2018	Seattle	United States	KeyArena	Kacey Musgraves	13,535 / 13,535	$1,118,751
9 July 2018	Sacramento	United States	Golden 1 Center	Kacey Musgraves	14,565 / 14,565	$1,209,501
11 July 2018	San Jose	United States	SAP Center	Kacey Musgraves	14,632 / 14,632	$1,171,338
13 July 2018	Inglewood	United States	The Forum	Kacey Musgraves	33,698 / 33,698	$2,700,031
14 July 2018	Inglewood	United States	The Forum	Kacey Musgraves	33,698 / 33,698	$2,700,031
Total					807,810 / 816,469 (99%)	$63,103,783

== Personnel ==
Band

- Harry Styles – lead vocals
- Mitchell Rowland – guitar, vocals
- Clare Uchima – keyboard, vocals
- Sarah Jones – drums, vocals
- Adam Prendergast – bass, vocals
