= Sweet Creature =

2017 song by Harry Styles

Promotional single by Harry Styles

from the album Harry Styles
- Released: 2 May 2017
- Studio: Harpoon's Barn (Los Angeles); The Village (Los Angeles)
- Genre: Folk rock
- Length: 3:45
- Label: Erskine; Columbia
- Songwriters: Harry Styles; Kid Harpoon
- Producers: Kid Harpoon; Jeff Bhasker; Alex Salibian; Tyler Johnson

"Sweet Creature" is a song by English singer Harry Styles from his self-titled debut studio album (2017). It was written by Styles and Kid Harpoon, while production was handled by the latter alongside Jeff Bhasker, Alex Salibian and Tyler Johnson. It was released for digital download and streaming as a promotional single on 2 May 2017, by Columbia Records. Musically, the song is an acoustic folk ballad that relies on a guitar-driven production. The lyrics tell of two young people, separated by circumstance but with a common bond, home.

Critics praised Styles's earnest vocal performance, and commented on the track's sound. Some felt that the song showcased Styles's strengths and signaled a maturity in his musical direction. The track received widespread comparisons to the Beatles' 1968 song, "Blackbird". "Sweet Creature" peaked at number 46 on the UK Singles Chart and entered the top 40 in record charts in Australia, Ireland, New Zealand, Scotland, and Spain. It received platinum certifications in Australia, Brazil, Canada, and the United States. Styles performed the song on The One Show, and included it on the setlist of Harry Styles: Live on Tour.

== Background ==
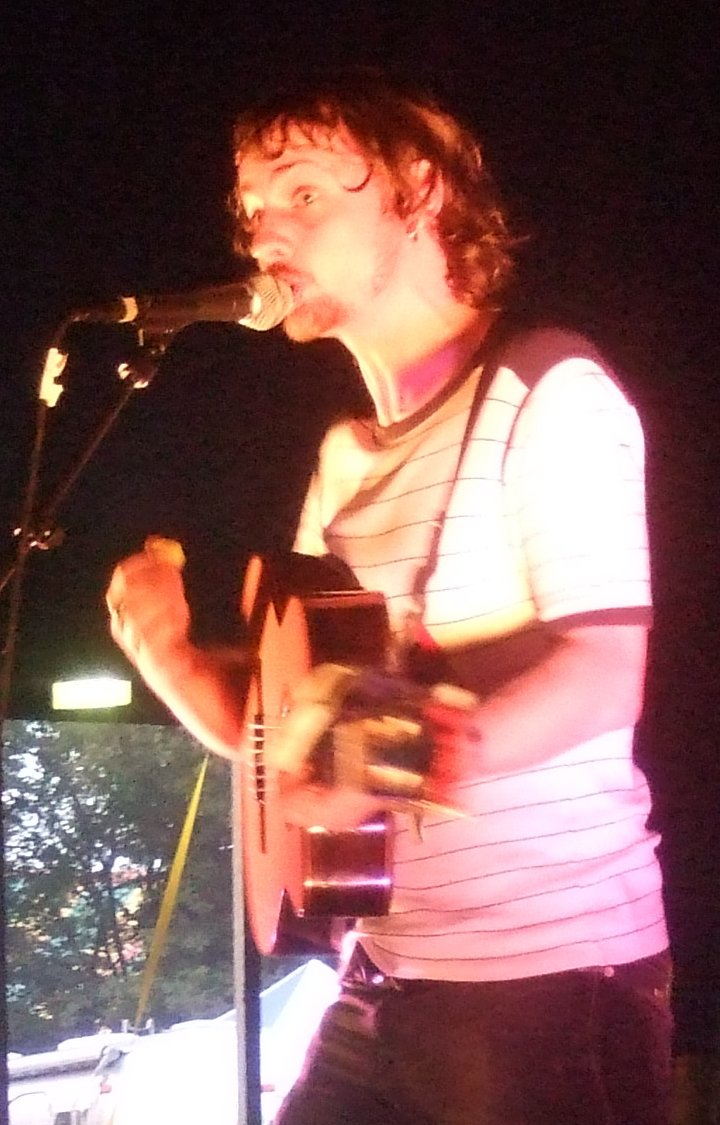
Kid Harpoon (pictured in 2007) in co-wrote and co-produced "Sweet Creature".

Harry Styles's music career began in 2010 as a member of the boy band One Direction. Rumours about Styles embarking on a solo career sparked in 2015 after four new songs written and recorded by him were registered on the ASCAP online database, that were believed to be for his potential debut solo album. Following One Direction's indefinite hiatus in 2016, he signed a recording contract with Columbia Records as a solo artist. In February 2017, Rob Stringer, the CEO of Columbia Records, revealed that Styles's debut album was close to being completed. Styles released his debut single "Sign of the Times" in April 2017, and announced that his eponymous debut studio album would be released the following month. For the album, he took inspiration from the music of Pink Floyd, the Beatles, the Rolling Stones, and Fleetwood Mac to recreate a 1970s-influenced rock record. Styles enlisted producers Jeff Bhasker, Alex Salibian, Tyler Johnson, and Kid Harpoon.

Styles wrote "Sweet Creature" with Harpoon. It was the first song that the duo wrote for the album. Production was handled by Harpoon, Bhasker, Salibian, and Johnson. The recording took place in Harpoon's Barn and The Village in Los Angeles. Harpoon played bass, guitar, and güiro, as well as provided background vocals. Bhasker played the piano and served as the executive producer. Harpoon and Ryan Nasci engineered the song with Matt Dyson and Michael Freeman. The song was mixed by Mark "Spike" Stent at EastWest Studios, Los Angeles, and mastered by Chris Gehringer at Sterling Sound in Edgewater, New Jersey.

== Music and lyrics ==
"Sweet Creature"
A 22-second sample of the refrain featuring fingerstyle guitar picking

"Sweet Creature" is an acoustic folk ballad, with a length of three minutes and 45 seconds. Bernard Zuel of The Sydney Morning Herald characterised its sound as country-pop. The song employs fingerstyle guitar picking, bass, simple harmonies, and background runs. On the track, Styles croons the song's title over and over, accompanied by guitar riffs. Sasha Geffen of MTV News noted that backing instruments and vocals get added later to the song's guitar-driven production. Geffen said that the track lowered the magnitude from Styles's sonorous debut single, "Sign of the Times", to "an intimate, acoustic level". According to Digital Spy's Justin Harp, the song, although not very different from the ballads of One Direction, marked a departure from the energetic pop sound of the band.

Several critics compared the track's acoustic guitar arrangement to that of the Beatles's 1968 song, "Blackbird". (Note: Those who compared "Sweet Creature" to "Blackbird" included The Atlantic's Spencer Kornhaber, DIY's Alim Kheraj, Drowned in Sound's Dave Hanratty, Exclaim!'s Corey van den Hoogenband, The Irish Times's Louise Bruton, Pitchfork's Jamieson Cox, Rolling Stone's Rob Sheffield, and Vox's Bridgett Henwood.) Reviewers such as, Rick Pearson of Evening Standard and Jeremy Gordon of Spin said that it sounded like the works of the pop singer Ed Sheeran, and Pearson compared it specifically to his 2017 album ÷. Variety's Eve Barlow noted that the song attempted to emulate the guitar sound of the Beatles' "Norwegian Wood", Plain White T's' "Hey There Delilah", and Fleetwood Mac's "Never Going Back Again".

In an interview with radio host Zach Sang in May 2017, Styles revealed that "Sweet Creature" was written about a specific person. He said that the song was "more so than one story, it's very much a piece of me that I haven't shared or talked about before". Sung in the form of a lullaby, according to Entertainment Weekly's Leah Greenblatt, the track's lyrics discuss the confusion and potency of young love. In the song, Styles sings of an imaginative animal, who's not named. A guitar strum opens the track, over which Styles sings: "Sweet creature, had another talk about where it's going wrong". It leads to the chorus, which has been described by Idolator's Mike Wass as "loved-up" and "starry-eyed": "Sweet creature, sweet creature/ When I run out of rope, you bring me home." Harp interpreted the refrain's lyrics as a declaration that "love alone is sometimes enough to bridge the divide in a rocky relationship". Annie Zaleski of The A.V. Club described it as "a simple but effective song praising the strength of a bond that endures despite turbulence".

== Critical reception ==
Critics complimented Styles's vocal performance, often singling out his singing as "earnest" and "honest", including Mikael Woo of the Los Angeles Times, who described Styles's vocals as "honeyed croon". Gordon said that as with Sheeran's best songs, "Sweet Creature" trades in fanciful words for sincere pining that awaits to captivate the listener with earnestness. Reviewers such as Billboard's Da'Shan Smith and Rolling Stone's Jon Blistein felt the song showcased Styles's vocal range that allowed him to perform "some pretty spectacular power notes". Bridgett Henwood of Vox and Jon Caramanica of The New York Times deemed "Sweet Creature" as one of the album's highlights, with the latter praising Styles's singing. BBC News writer Mark Savage labelled it as the album's "most effective, direct song". Greenblatt regarded the song as "delicate sketches, wistful and pretty", alongside the track "Two Ghosts". Writing for the Windsor Star, Chris Lackner viewed it as "a tear-jerking, lighter charged live concert closer".

Reviewers felt that the song showcased Styles's strengths and signaled a maturity in his musical direction. Harp felt that the song displayed Styles's musical maturity and singled out the lyrics on the refrain to explain his viewpoint. Similarly, Jessica Hopper of MTV News noted that it signaled a musical maturity for Styles, by "sound[ing] like someone wanting the intimacy and quiet sensuality of Jeff Buckley's Grace and Ryan Adams's Heartbreaker". David Sackllah of Consequence asserted that the track finds Styles relaxed and that he is able to "find his strengths". In a similar vein, Daniel Tovar from Pretty Much Amazing commented that the song demonstrated Styles's skill as a balladeer.

The track's sound, described by The Straits Times as a "modern-day take" on "Blackbird", and noted approvingly by Exclaim!, was criticised by Drowned in Sound as "the latest futile attempt at a 'Blackbird' reworking". Leonie Coope, writing for NME, felt the song rendered a "country-indebted Laurel Canyon sound" that "could have as easily have been written about Joni Mitchell as much as his ex Taylor Swift". In a less enthusiastic review, music critic Greg Kot dismissed the song as trivial, although he discerned that Styles's vocals and the guitar arrangement made him "appear older than his years".

== Release and commercial performance ==
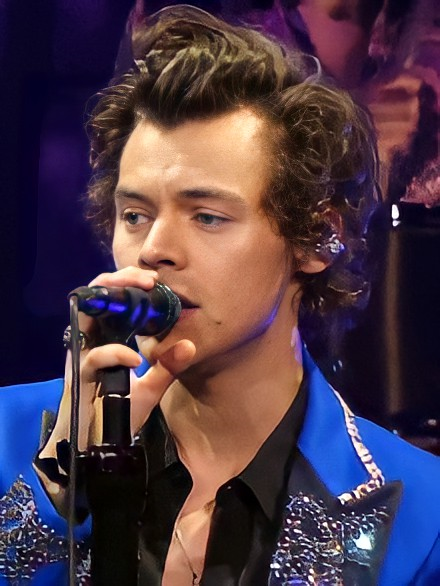
Styles performing "Sweet Creature" on Harry Styles: Live on Tour in 2018

Harry Styles premiered "Sweet Creature" on Zane Lowe's radio show on Apple Music 1, on 2 May 2017. Columbia Records simultaneously released the song for digital download and streaming as a promotional single from Harry Styles. (Note: While some sources refer to "Sweet Creature" as the second single, Columbia Records noted that "Sign of the Times" was the current single when "Sweet Creature" was released, and an insider report indicates that "Two Ghosts" is Harry Style's second single.) Upon its release, the song reached the top of the Billboard Twitter Real-Time chart.

The song debuted at number 74 on the UK Singles Chart dated 12 May 2017. The following week, it reached number 46, which became its peak. The song received a platinum certification from the British Phonographic Industry (BPI), which denotes track-equivalent sales of 600,000 units. The single peaked within the top 40 at number 21 in Spain, number 37 in Ireland and Scotland, and number 39 in Australia and New Zealand. Elsewhere, it reached number 52 in France, number 55 in Slovakia, number 57 in Czech Republic and Portugal, number 69 in Canada, number 78 in Netherlands, number 85 in Italy, number 93 in the United States, and number 95 in Sweden. The single also received gold certifications in Denmark and Italy, platinum certifications in Brazil, Canada, and the United States and double platinum in Australia.

On 12 May 2017, Styles first performed "Sweet Creature" on The One Show. The following day, he sang it on his one-night concert at the Garage, London to promote the release of Harry Styles. Styles included it on the setlist for Harry Styles: Live on Tour, which ran from September 2017 to July 2018. While reviewing his concert at the Forum on 14 July 2018, August Brown of Los Angeles Times said that Styles's performance of "Sweet Creature" showcased his "big range and comfort in the most intimate of arrangements".

== Credits and personnel ==
Credits are adapted from the liner notes of Harry Styles.

- Harry Styles – lead vocals, writer, background vocals
- Kid Harpoon – producer, writer, bass, guitar, güiro, background vocals, engineering
- Jeff Bhasker – producer, piano
- Alex Salibian – producer
- Tyler Johnson – producer
- Ryan Nasci – engineering
- Matt Dyson – assistant engineering
- Michael Freeman – assistant engineering
- Mark "Spike" Stent – mixing
- Chris Gehringer – mastering

== Charts ==
Weekly chart performance of "Sweet Creature"
Chart (2017)	Peak position
Australia (ARIA)	39
Canada Hot 100 (Billboard)	69
Czech Republic Singles Digital (ČNS IFPI)	57
Finland Download (Latauslista)	12
France (SNEP)	52
Hungary (Single Top 40)	13
Ireland (IRMA)	37
Italy (FIMI)	85
Netherlands (Single Top 100)	78
New Zealand (Recorded Music NZ)	39
Portugal (AFP)	57
Scottish Singles Sales (Official Charts)	37
Slovakia (Singles Digitál Top 100)	55
Spain (Promusicae)	21
Sweden (Sverigetopplistan)	95
UK Singles (Official Charts)	46
US Billboard Hot 100	93

== Certifications ==
Certifications for "Sweet Creature"
Region	Certification	Certified units/sales
Australia (ARIA)	2× Platinum	140,000^{‡}
Brazil (Pro-Música Brasil)	Platinum	60,000^{‡}
Canada (Music Canada)	Platinum	80,000^{‡}
Denmark (IFPI Danmark)	Gold	45,000^{‡}
Italy (FIMI)	Gold	35,000^{‡}
Mexico (AMPROFON)	Platinum+Gold	90,000^{‡}
New Zealand (RMNZ)	2× Platinum	60,000^{‡}
Poland (ZPAV)	Gold	25,000^{‡}
United Kingdom (BPI)	Platinum	600,000^{‡}
United States (RIAA)	2× Platinum	2,000,000^{‡}
Streaming
Sweden (GLF)	Gold	4,000,000^{†}
^{‡} Sales+streaming figures based on certification alone.^{†} Streaming-only figures based on certification alone.
