= Ny Oh =

- Born: Naomi Ludlow; 1994 (age 31–32); Worcestershire, U.K.
- Genres: Folk, psychedelic
- Occupations: Singer, songwriter, musician
- Instruments: Vocals, guitar, piano, percussion
- Years active: 2014–present
- Member of: Neon Gru
- Website: nyoh.me

Naomi Ludlow (born 1994), known professionally as Ny Oh, is a New Zealand folk singer, songwriter, and multi-instrumentalist. She is the lead singer of the band Neon Gru and has toured with Harry Styles as a multi-instrumentalist for his Love On Tour.

== Early life ==
Ny Oh was born in the United Kingdom in 1994. However, she moved to New Zealand when she was three and grew up in Tauranga. Her mother is a flautist and a music teacher. When she was four years old, Ny Oh began playing piano. As a teenager, she took vocal lessons and played the violin. She learned the viola and guitar at Bethlehem College. Growing up, she was a fan of New Zealand musicians such as OMC, Crowded House, and Bic Runga as well as international acts like John Mayer, Pink Floyd, and Bruce Springsteen.

When she was 18, she relocated to London to attend the Institute of Contemporary Music Performance for vocal performance. She made a living working for a vegan café and busking. She spent much of her early twenties backpacking and hitchhiking and spent time living on an illegally moored boat with other musicians near Camden Town.

== Career ==
In 2014, Ny Oh featured on the tracks "Younger Now" and "We Will Be Love" on Roaman's album Younger Now. She collaborated with Roaman again in 2016 on the track "Free at Last" for his album Free at Last. Ny Oh toured with Jonathan Wilson in 2018 and was part of Jesse Sheehan's band as well as part of a songwriting collective called The Lyrical Nomads. Also in 2018, Ny Oh released her first single, "Georgia," and her first EP, Without.

Ny Oh, along with five other musicians, formed the band Neon Gru in 2018. In 2019, they released their first single, "Growing Pains." Ny Oh assisted with promotion of Harry Styles' album, Fine Line, as an anticipated new member of his touring band. Later in 2020, Neon Gru released two additional singles, "Moonlight" and "Hot Wine." In 2021, Ny Oh toured with Harry Styles during his Love on Tour.

In 2022, Ny Oh was a featured artist on the track TAURUS on Pauli Lovejoy's OFFAIR: The Power of your Subconscious Mind Vol 1: SPACE. Garden of Eden, Ny Oh's second EP, also released in 2022. Neon Gru released two additional singles in 2022: a cover of Phoebe Bridgers' song "Motion Sickness" and an original song called "Elon" Ny Oh continued to tour with Harry Styles in 2022 and 2023. She opened for Styles on March 7, 2023, for his show in Auckland, New Zealand.

== Reception ==
Neon Gru's music has been described "eclectic and imaginative" by IndieGems and "stunningly beautiful" by A&R Factory. Ramona Magazine described Ny Oh's songwriting as "the love child of Joni Mitchell and Joan Baez." 1883 Magazine described her single "You Are" as "a slow-burning gem full of enthralling vocals, tender lyricism, crisp piano, and nuances."

== Discography ==
Year	Artist	Album
2018	Ny Oh	Without
2021	Neon Gru	I Am a Bird
2022	Ny Oh	Ny Oh's Garden of Eden
2025	Ny Oh	Wildwood
