= Maddy Jane =

Australian musician (born 1996)

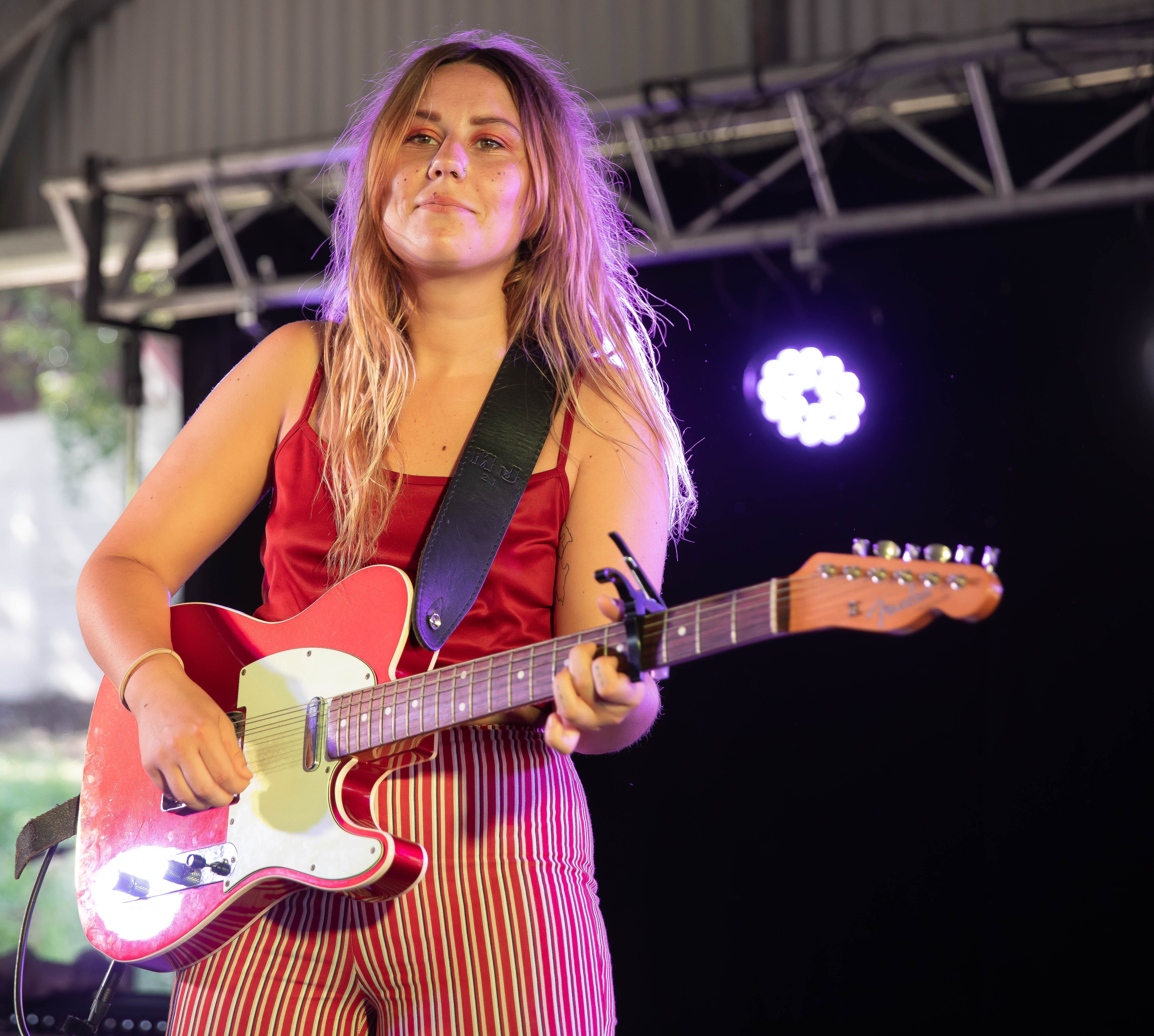
- Maddy Jane in 2018

Background information
- Born: Madeleine Jane Woolley; 1996 (age 29–30); Bruny Island, Tasmania, Australia
- Genres: Indie rock; punk rock
- Occupations: Singer; songwriter
- Instruments: Vocals; guitar
- Years active: 2015–present
- Labels: Lemon Tree Music; Sony Music Australia
- Website: maddyjane.com.au

Madeleine Jane Woolley, who performs as Maddy Jane (born 1996), is an Australian singer-songwriter and guitarist from Bruny Island.

In 2015, she released her debut single "People". In 2017, she released the singles "No Other Way" and "Thank You and Sorry". All three singles featured on her debut extended play, Not Human at All, which was released on 2 March 2018.

She has supported the Australian leg of tours by Harry Styles (November 2017) and by Red Hot Chili Peppers (2019).

She released her debut album Not All Bad or Good on 1 May 2020.

== Early life ==
Madeleine Jane Woolley was born in 1996 and was raised in Lunawanna, Bruny Island. Her parents owned a vineyard. She later described the place, "you are used to waving to everyone and knowing everyone. I have learnt to be more comfortable in bigger situations, because I am just a little small town girl. I have definitely had to get used to the scale of things."

== Career ==
=== 2015–17: "People" and Not Human at All ===
Woolley released her debut single "People" in 2015. She released her second single, "Drown It Out", in December 2016. Follow-up singles "No Other Way" and "Thank You and Sorry" were released in 2017. All three singles featured on her debut extended play, Not Human at All, which was released on 2 March 2018 via Lemon Tree Music/Sony Music Australia. . Dylan Marshall of The AU Review observed, "for the uninitiated, if you had to find an artist that is a cross somewhere between the wit and drawl of Courtney Barnett, Camp Cope's honesty and lyricism and the guitar hooks of early San Cisco, then you'd find someone that resembles [Jane]."

=== 2017–19: Touring with Harry Styles and Red Hot Chili Peppers ===
Woolley supported the Australian leg of tours by Harry Styles in November 2017 and by Red Hot Chili Peppers in 2019.

Australian surf and garage rock band, Skegss, have performed cover versions of her tracks, including "I Know What I Know Already", "Ideal", "No Other Way", "Not Human at All", and "People".

=== 2020–present: Not All Bad or Good ===
Woolley's debut album Not All Bad or Good was released on 1 May 2020, through Lemon Tree Music and Sony Music Australia. The album featured previously released singles such as "The Other Day," "Something Old and Something New," and "Say You Weren't Mine." Shortly after the release, on 26 June 2020, Woolley appeared on Triple J's Like a Version segment, where she performed a cover of Natasha Bedingfield's "Unwritten" along with an acoustic performance of her original track "Perfection's a Thing and You're It." Since the album's launch, she has continued to write and perform, releasing standalone singles including "Island Time" (2021), "A Woman Is a Woman" (2025), and "Thylacine"..

== Discography ==
=== Studio albums ===
List of studio albums, with release date and label shown
| Title | Album details |
|---|---|
| Not All Bad or Good | Released: 1 May 2020; Label: Lemon Tree Records, Sony Music Australia; Formats: CD, digital download, streaming |

=== Extended plays ===
List of extended plays, with release date and label shown
| Title | Details |
|---|---|
| Not Human at All | Released: 2 March 2018; Label: Lemon Tree Records, Sony Music Australia (19075837722); Formats: CD, digital download, streaming |

=== Singles ===
List of singles, with year released and album shown
| Title | Year | Album |
|---|---|---|
| "People" | 2015 | Non-album single |
| "Drown It Out" | 2016 | Not Human At All (Note: "Thank You and Sorry" also appears on Not All Bad or Good.) |
| "No Other Way" | 2017 | Not Human At All |
| "Thank You and Sorry" | 2017 | Not Human At All |
| "The Other Day" | 2018 | Not All Bad or Good |
| "Something Old and Something New" | 2019 | Not All Bad or Good |
| "Say You Weren't Mine" | 2019 | Not All Bad or Good |
| "Perfection's a Thing and You're It" | 2020 | Not All Bad or Good |
| "Dreams" | 2020 | Non-album single |
| "You're Not Mine (But I Think You Should Be)" | 2020 | Non-album single |
| "Island Time" | 2021 | TBA |
| "A Woman Is a Woman" | 2025 | TBA |
| "Thylacine" | 2025 | TBA |
