= Alex Salibian =

- Origin: Long Beach, California
- Genres: Pop; pop rock; country
- Occupations: Record producer; songwriter
- Instruments: Vocals; keyboards; guitar; bass
- Years active: 2015–present
- Labels: Kravenworks; Columbia; Atlantic; BMG

Alex Salibian is an American record producer and songwriter who spent the first portion of his career under Jeff Bhasker's production company, Kravenworks. He has written and produced for artists such as Harry Styles, Young the Giant, The Head and the Heart, Eddie Benjamin, MisterWives, and Jess Glynne. A classically trained musician, he has worked extensively in the pop and pop/rock genres over the course of his career.

In 2025 he is currently collaborating with Eddie Benjamin on his debut album, with the first single 'MANIAC' released this past January. He is based in Los Angeles, California.

== Songwriting and production ==
Year	Artist	Album	Song	Credit
2025	Eddie Benjamin		"MANIAC"	Producer & Writer
2023	Eddie Benjamin	Weatherman	"All For Nothing"	Producer & Writer
2023	Eddie Benjamin	Weatherman	"This Place"	Producer & Writer
2023	Eddie Benjamin	Weatherman	"Dreaming of These Days"	Producer & Writer
2023	Duncan Laurence	Skyboy	"Baby Blues"	Producer & Writer
2023	Rosa Linn	Lay Your Hands Upon My Heart	"Lay Your Hands Upon My Heart"	Producer
2023	Rosa Linn	Lay Your Hands Upon My Heart	"Mountains"	Producer
2023	Annika Rose		"Lost (feat. Jagwar Twin)"	Producer
2023	Annika Rose		"Dad"	Producer
2022	Annika Rose		"Bruises"	Producer
2022	Annika Rose		"Bruises - Piano Version"	Producer
2022	Annika Rose		"In My Head"	Producer
2022	Rosa Linn		"SNAP"	Producer
2022	Rosa Linn		"WDIA(Would Do It Again)"	Producer
2022	Corey Harper	"Future Tense"	"Villain Of Your Story"	Producer & Writer
2022	Corey Harper	"Future Tense"	"Pink Razor"	Producer & Writer
2022	Corey Harper	"Future Tense"	"Vulnerable In The Sky"	Producer
2022	Corey Harper	"Future Tense"	"Not THat Great Of A Lover"	Producer
2022	Corey Harper	"Future Tense"	"Still Need To Love You"	Producer
2022	Corey Harper	"Future Tense"	"One Day"	Producer
2022	Corey Harper	"Future Tense"	"Common Ground"	Producer
2022	Corey Harper	"Future Tense"	"The Side Of Me"	Producer & Writer
2022	Corey Harper	"Future Tense"	"Futuretense"	Producer
2022	Rafferty		"Downtown"	Producer
2022	Young The Giant	"American Bollywood"	"Otherside"	Writer
2020	MisterWives	"Superbloom"	"over the rainbow"	Producer & Writer
2020	MisterWives	"Superbloom"	"running in place"	Producer & Writer
2020	MisterWives	"Superbloom"	"muse"	Producer & Writer
2019	Jess Glynne		No One (Acoustic)	Producer
2019	The Head and the Heart	Living Mirage	"See You Through My Eyes"	Producer
2019	The Head and the Heart	Living Mirage	"Missed Connection"	Producer
2019	The Head and the Heart	Living Mirage	"People Need A Melody"	Producer & Writer
2019	The Head and the Heart	Living Mirage	"Honeybee"	Producer & Writer
2019	The Head and the Heart	Living Mirage	"Brenda"	Producer & Writer
2019	The Head and the Heart	Living Mirage	"Running Through Hell"	Producer
2019	The Head and the Heart	Living Mirage	"Saving Grace"	Producer
2019	The Head and the Heart	Living Mirage	"I Found Out"	Producer
2019	The Head and the Heart	Living Mirage	"Living Mirage"	Producer
2019	The Head and the Heart	Living Mirage	"Glory of Music"	Producer
2018	Jess Glynne		I'll Be There (Acoustic)	Producer
2018	Young the Giant	Mirror Master	"Tightrope"	Producer
2018	Young the Giant	Mirror Master	"Simplify"	Producer
2018	Young the Giant	Mirror Master	"You + I"	Producer & Writer
2018	Young the Giant	Mirror Master	"Mirror Master"	Producer
2017	Harry Styles	Harry Styles	"Meet Me in the Hallway"	Producer & Writer
2017	Harry Styles	Harry Styles	"Sign of the Times"	Producer & Writer
2017	Harry Styles	Harry Styles	"Carolina"	Producer & Writer
2017	Harry Styles	Harry Styles	"Two Ghosts"	Producer
2017	Harry Styles	Harry Styles	"Sweet Creature"	Producer
2017	Harry Styles	Harry Styles	"Only Angel"	Producer & Writer
2017	Harry Styles	Harry Styles	"Kiwi"	Producer & Writer
2017	Harry Styles	Harry Styles	"Ever Since New York"	Producer & Writer
2017	Harry Styles	Harry Styles	"Woman"	Producer & Writer
2017	Harry Styles	Harry Styles	"From the Dining Table"	Producer & Writer
2017	Wilding	"here"	"Leavin'"	Producer & Writer
2017	Wilding	"here"	"Lilywhite"	Writer
2016	Young the Giant	Home of the Strange	"Amerika"	Producer
2016	Young the Giant	Home of the Strange	"Something to Believe In"	Producer & Writer
2016	Young the Giant	Home of the Strange	"Elsewhere"	Producer
2016	Young the Giant	Home of the Strange	"Mr. Know-It-All"	Producer & Writer
2016	Young the Giant	Home of the Strange	"Jungle Youth"	Producer
2016	Young the Giant	Home of the Strange	"Titus Was Born"	Producer
2016	Young the Giant	Home of the Strange	"Repeat"	Producer
2016	Young the Giant	Home of the Strange	"Silvertongue"	Producer
2016	Young the Giant	Home of the Strange	"Art Exhibit"	Producer
2016	Young the Giant	Home of the Strange	"Nothing's Over"	Producer
2016	Young the Giant	Home of the Strange	"Home of the Strange"	Producer
2015	Cam	Untamed	"Burning House"	Engineer
2015	Mikky Ekko	Time	"Burning Doves"	Additional Production
2015	Elle King	Love Stuff	"Last Damn Night"	Additional Production
2015	Elle King	Love Stuff	"Kocaine Karolina"	Additional Production
