= Kiwi (song) =

Single by Harry Styles

from the album Harry Styles
- Released: 31 October 2017
- Studio: Gee Jam, Port Antonio, Jamaica; Enormous, Venice, California
- Genre: Hard rock; glam rock
- Length: 2:56
- Label: Erskine; Columbia
- Songwriters: Harry Styles; Jeff Bhasker; Mitch Rowland; Alex Salibian; Tyler Johnson; Ryan Nasci
- Producers: Bhasker; Salibian; Johnson

Harry Styles singles chronology
"Two Ghosts" (2017)	"Kiwi" (2017)	"Lights Up" (2019)

Music video
- "Kiwi" on YouTube

"Kiwi" is a song recorded by English singer-songwriter Harry Styles for his self-titled debut album. The song was released as the third and final single from the album.

== Background ==
The song is one of the more sexually overt songs on the album, and includes lyrics about cigarettes, liquor, a femme fatale, and a one night stand. Styles told BBC Radio 1 that the song "started out as a joke, now it’s one of my favourite songs. It’s one of the first ones I wrote for the album when I was getting out a lot of energy".

== Music video ==
The music video for the song was released on 8 November 2017, directed by the filmmaking duo Us. It follows Styles and a group of children as they engage in large cake fight in Wimbledon Chase Primary School. Child actress Beau Gadsdon plays Styles' female lookalike in the video.

== Live performances ==
In May 2017, Styles performed "Kiwi" on The Late Late Show with James Corden. In November, he performed the song on The X Factor UK and CBS Radio’s 5th annual We Can Survive concert at the Hollywood Bowl; held in honour of National Breast Cancer Awareness Month with proceeds going to Young Survival Coalition. The same month, Styles performed on the runway during the 2017 Victoria's Secret Fashion Show in Shanghai at the Mercedes-Benz Arena, opening the show with "Kiwi".

== Commercial performance ==
The single was certified Gold in March 2020 in the United States and Silver in the United Kingdom in April 2020.

== Critics ==
Rolling Stone described the song as a "glam-punk body-slam guitar blast".

== Charts ==
Chart (2017–2018)	Peak position
Australia (ARIA)	92
Belgium (Ultratop 50 Flanders)	39
Ireland (IRMA)	72
Mexico Ingles Airplay (Billboard)	29
New Zealand Heatseekers (Recorded Music NZ)	1
Scottish Singles Sales (Official Charts)	49
Slovakia (Singles Digitál Top 100)	76
UK Singles (Official Charts)	66
US Pop Airplay (Billboard)	40

== Certifications ==
Region	Certification	Certified units/sales
Australia (ARIA)	Platinum	70,000^{‡}
Brazil (Pro-Música Brasil)	Platinum	60,000^{‡}
Canada (Music Canada)	Gold	40,000^{‡}
Italy (FIMI)	Gold	50,000^{‡}
Mexico (AMPROFON)	2× Platinum+Gold	150,000^{‡}
New Zealand (RMNZ)	Platinum	30,000^{‡}
Poland (ZPAV)	Gold	25,000^{‡}
Spain (Promusicae)	Gold	30,000^{‡}
United Kingdom (BPI)	Platinum	600,000^{‡}
United States (RIAA)	Platinum	1,000,000^{‡}
^{‡} Sales+streaming figures based on certification alone.

== Release history ==
Region	Date	Format	Label	Ref.
Various	12 May 2017	Digital download; streaming	Erskine; Columbia	
United States	31 October 2017	Contemporary hit radio	Columbia	
