= Harry Styles (album) =

2017 studio album by Harry Styles

Studio album by Harry Styles
- Released: 12 May 2017
- Recorded: 2016
- Studios: Gee Jam (Port Antonio, Jamaica); The Village (Los Angeles); Enormous (Venice, California); Harpoon's Barn (Los Angeles); Erskine House (London)
- Genres: Soft rock; Britpop; pop; rock
- Length: 40:18
- Labels: Erskine; Columbia
- Producers: Jeff Bhasker; Kid Harpoon; Tyler Johnson; Alex Salibian

Harry Styles chronology
Harry Styles (2017)	Fine Line (2019)

Singles from Harry Styles
- 1. "Sign of the Times" Released: 7 April 2017; 2. "Two Ghosts" Released: 7 August 2017; 3. "Kiwi" Released: 31 October 2017

Harry Styles is the first solo studio album by the English singer and songwriter Harry Styles. The album was released on 12 May 2017, through Erskine and Columbia Records. For the album, Styles worked with producers Jeff Bhasker, Alex Salibian, Tyler Johnson and Kid Harpoon.

Lyrically, Harry Styles' themes is dominated by focus on women and relationships. The record has been described by various publications as influenced by music from the 1960s and 1970s, including classic rock and singer-songwriter ballads. It was preceded by the release of its lead single, "Sign of the Times", while "Two Ghosts" and "Kiwi" served as the second and third worldwide singles, respectively. In support of the album, Styles embarked on his first headlining concert tour, Harry Styles: Live on Tour.

The album received generally positive reviews from music critics and was featured on numerous 2017 year-end rankings. It debuted atop the charts in several countries, including Australia, Canada, the UK and the US. It has been certified platinum in the UK, the US, Australia, Canada, Italy, Brazil, Denmark, Poland, and Mexico. According to the International Federation of the Phonographic Industry (IFPI), Harry Styles was the ninth global best-selling album of 2017 with sales of one million copies.

== Background ==
In August 2015, One Direction announced that an extended hiatus would take place following the release of their fifth studio album. In January 2016, Us Weekly published a report claiming that the group's hiatus would, in fact, become a permanent split, noting that each of the four remaining group members did not renew their contracts following the completion of the On the Road Again Tour in October 2015. Representatives for the group denied the report in a statement to Billboard, stating, "nothing has changed regarding hiatus plans for the group, and all will be revealed in due time from the band members' own mouths."

In February 2016, it was confirmed that Styles had left the group's management, becoming the second member of the band to do so after Zayn Malik's departure almost a year prior. In June, it was confirmed that Styles had signed a recording contract with Columbia Records.

Styles enlisted American producer Jeff Bhasker to executive produce the album. Most of the album is written by the two with Bhasker associates producers Tyler Johnson and Alex Salibian, engineer/bassist Ryan Nasci, and guitarist Mitch Rowland; Rowland was introduced by Nasci when a session musician dropped out.

Additionally, One Direction producer John Ryan helped write "Two Ghosts" with Julian Bunetta and English singer-songwriter Kid Harpoon produced "Carolina" and "Sweet Creature". Johnson and Kid Harpoon would go on to produce much of Styles' second album Fine Line together.

Recording sessions for the album took place in a number of locations, including in Los Angeles, London, and the Gee Jam Hotel Recording Studio in Port Antonio, Jamaica, where Styles and his production team had a two-month writing retreat in the autumn of 2016. The album was primarily recorded at The Village in Los Angeles.

== Promotion ==
On 31 March 2017, Styles announced the album's lead single to be "Sign of the Times", which was released on 7 April. The album name, artwork, and track list were revealed on 13 April. The album track "Sweet Creature" was released as a promotional single on 2 May. (Note: While some sources refer to "Sweet Creature" as the second single, Columbia Records noted that "Sign of the Times" was the current single when "Sweet Creature" was released, and an insider report indicates that "Two Ghosts" is Harry Styles' second single.) Styles performed the songs "Sign of the Times" and "Ever Since New York" on 15 April episode of Saturday Night Live. On 21 April, Styles appeared on The Graham Norton Show for his first televised solo performance in his native country, and guested on the French talk show, Quotidien, five days later; he performed "Sign of the Times" on both shows.

On 9 May, Styles performed the tracks "Carolina", "Sign of the Times", "Ever Since New York", and a cover of One Direction's "Stockholm Syndrome" on The Today Show. The album was officially released days later, on 12 May. On 13 May, a day after the album's release, he held a surprise concert at The Garage in London. Styles held a similar show at the Troubadour in Los Angeles on 19 May, and invited Fleetwood Mac's Stevie Nicks to perform as a special guest. Proceeds from both shows were donated to charity. On 15 May, Harry Styles: Behind the Album was released exclusively on Apple Music, a 49-minute documentary film showing footage from his writing and recording sessions in Jamaica and Los Angeles; The Performances version features a full-length live performance of the album filmed at London's Abbey Road Studios. Styles was the musical guest on The Late Late Show with James Corden every night in the week spanning from 15 to 18 May, and performed in various sketches alongside Corden. In support of the album, Styles embarked on his first solo tour, Harry Styles: Live on Tour, which ran from September 2017 through to July 2018 and visited North America, Europe, Asia, Oceania, and South America. On tour, Styles debuted two unreleased songs, "Oh Anna" and "Medicine", which were originally written for the album.

== Music and themes ==
"A lot of my influences, and the stuff that I love, is older... I didn't want to put out my first album and be like, 'He's tried to re-create the Sixties, Seventies, Eighties, Nineties.' Loads of amazing music was written then, but I'm not saying I wish I lived back then. I wanted to do something that sounds like me."

— Styles in Rolling Stone

Music publications have described the album as soft rock, rock, Britpop, and pop. Critics noted influences by British classic rock and singer-songwriter folk. Variety's Eve Barlow described the album as a "cocktail of psychedelia, Britpop, and balladry", while for Jon Caramanica of The New York Times it "is steeped in the singer-songwriter music of the late 1960s and 1970s, and in moments, in the flamboyant harder rock of the late 1970s and 1980s." Lyrically, the album's themes mostly focus on women and relationships. In a Rolling Stone interview with Cameron Crowe, Styles said "The one subject that hits the hardest is love, whether it’s platonic, romantic, loving it, gaining it, losing it...it always hits you hardest."

== Songs ==
=== Tracks 1–5 ===
"'Sign of the Times' came from, 'This isn't the first time we've been in a hard time, and it's not going to be the last time.' The song is written from a point of view as if a mother was giving birth to a child and there's a complication. The mother is told, 'The child is fine, but you're not going to make it.' The mother has five minutes to tell the child, 'Go forth and conquer.'"

— Styles on the premise of his debut single.

The album's opening track, "Meet Me in the Hallway", is a psychedelic pop ballad. Critics compared it to John Lennon and David Bowie vocally, with aspects of Pink Floyd on the guitar.

"Sign of the Times" is Styles's debut single. Conceived in Jamaica as a pop rock and soft rock ballad, the song was written and recorded in 3 hours. The song peaked at number 4 on the Billboard Hot 100 chart and number one on the UK Singles chart; it is certified 5x platinum by the Recording Industry Association of America and is considered one of the 500 Greatest Songs of All Time by Rolling Stone's editors.

The vaguely Caribbean groover track "Carolina" recalls Blur's Britpop style; described by Styles as "the little bit of fun we had been wanting but didn't have" while making the album. "Two Ghosts" is a country influenced soft rock ballad about former lovers. "Two Ghosts" is certified platinum by the RIAA. Lullaby-like folk acoustic ballad "Sweet Creature" discusses the strength of a bond that endures despite bad times. "Sweet Creature" is certified 2x platinum by the RIAA.

=== Tracks 6–10 ===
The uptempo song "Only Angel" veers towards glam rock and contains dialogue from the film Barfly (1987), written by Styles's hero Charles Bukowski. In the rock song "Kiwi", he sings about a classic femme fatale. The song is certified platinum by the RIAA.

A slower track, the rock troubadour "Ever Since New York", features lyrics that are a meditation on loss and longing. The song is perceived to be a response to Taylor Swift's song "Style" (which in turn is perceived to have been a play on his surname). "Woman" has elements of funk rock, in which Styles compares his jealousy to a howling beast. The acoustic closer track, "From The Dining Table", features lush, multi-part harmonies, and recalls the confessional style of the album's opener.

== Critical reception ==
Professional ratings
Aggregate scores
Source	Rating
AnyDecentMusic?	6.5/10
Metacritic	68/100
Review scores
Source	Rating
AllMusic	3/5 stars
The Daily Telegraph	3/5 stars
Entertainment Weekly	B
Evening Standard	3/5 stars
The Guardian	3/5 stars
The Independent	3/5 stars
Los Angeles Times	4/5 stars
NME	3/5 stars
Pitchfork	6.8/10
Rolling Stone	4/5 stars

At Metacritic, which assigns a normalised rating out of 100 to reviews from mainstream publications, the album has an average score of 68 based on 24 reviews, indicating "generally favorable reviews". AllMusic critic Tim Sendra opined that the album works "exceedingly well" as a modern pop record and an extension of the sound and brand of One Direction, but "as the kind of personal statement Styles wants to make, it comes very close, but ultimately falls just short." For Jason Lipshutz of Billboard, Styles "has opted to forego radio play and make a big, brash guitar album", arguing, "his commitment to conjuring the spirit of '70s rock never comes across as overreaching." Rolling Stone's Rob Sheffield states that Styles "claims his turf as a true rock & roll prince" on his "superb solo debut". Mikael Wood of Los Angeles Times wrote Styles "never overplays his hand on this winningly relaxed collection", but found the "dad-baiting" album to be "full of echoes of The Beatles, Pink Floyd and The Rolling Stones." MusicOMH's John Murphy commented that even though it occasionally "dips into bland pastiche", the album is a "fine solo effort", which "as the latest step in rebranding Styles for a brand new audience, it will do just fine". Annie Zaleski of The A.V. Club felt Styles took a "bold step forward by leaning on the past", adding, "hopefully the songs will someday catch up to his ambition". Rick Pearson of Evening Standard called it "a self-consciously serious and grown-up effort".

Alexis Petridis of The Guardian stated that while "Styles is remarkably good as a confessional singer-songwriter [...] not all the album's musical homages work". Jon Caramanica of The New York Times felt the "sometimes great, sometimes foggy" album is "almost bold in its resistance to contemporary pop music aesthetics." David Sakllah of Consequence of Sound wrote "the missteps don't detract too much from this ambitious, if slightly unfocused, debut", as "he's certainly on the right track". Mesfin Fekadu of Associated Press noted the performance aspect of the album is where Styles "truly shines", but "not so much" in the creative process. Anjali Raguraman of The Straits Times called "Sign of the Times" the "strongest" track on the album and felt Styles sounds "most self-assured on the slower numbers", while noting that "his inexperience shows when he falls into tired tropes". Regarding the use of tropes, Roisin O'Connor of The Independent was disappointed that Styles did not "break away from some of the more fatigued gender archetypes that dominate the rock music he clearly loves." Shahzaib Hussain of Clash contended that Styles "[created] an immersive, reference-fuelled tribute to classic rock for the millennial generation", albeit "[offering] little in the way of innovation". However, Hussain singles out "Only Angel" and "Kiwi" for being "misfires", calling the tracks "a one-two punch of masochistic, rock swaggering, admirable in its legerdemain, [that] ultimately comes undone by haphazard lyricism." In a negative review, Dave Hanratty of Drowned in Sound felt that Styles "failed to make a defining statement", writing that the album "from start to finish [...] is a series of impressions" of Elton John, Beck, Mick Jagger, and The Beatles.

Neil McCormick of The Daily Telegraph wrote that, compared to the other One Direction member's solo careers, Styles' is "more eccentric but more appealing, with an endearing quality of relish in its musical adventures", calling the album "so old-fashioned it may actually come across as something new to its target audience" and "perfectly lovely and about as substantial as ripples on the surface of a Beverly Hills swimming pool". Leah Greenblaat of Entertainment Weekly named Styles "a man proudly looking backward, a faithful revivalist steeped in the tao of dusty vinyl and dad rock" while noting that he "basks in the privilege of paying tribute to his many musical heroes, and trying on all the styles that fit". Leonie Cooper of NME described the album as "a not-that-bad-actually mish-mash of Los Angeles' style classic rock and ballads", commenting that fans will be "over the moon with this collection of radio-friendly rockers and heartstring tugging balladry" and "everyone else" will be "pleasantly surprised – if not a little taken aback at just how many tricks he’s pinched from other artists". She ends the review by opining that "taking inspiration from the best seems to have paid dividends, but it doesn’t half make you wonder what the real Harry Styles sounds like". Jamieson Cox of Pitchfork wrote that the record "pays fine tribute to classic rock’n’roll and shows off his exceptional voice, if not his enigmatic persona", opining that his "vocal performances are invariably the best parts of these songs" while particuraly praising the album's last track, "From the Dining Table", writing that "it’s intoxicating, and it ends Harry Styles on the most promising possible note".

Retrospectively, the album has received acclaim from publications who were initially critical of the project. In 2022, Consequence of Sound retracted their low grade of the album, stating "The man’s solo debut was not C+ material [...] What’s odd is that the initial review that ran on Consequence is overwhelmingly complimentary — we’re happy to now set the record straight and confirm that Styles’ debut solo record is a great one." In 2024, American Songwriter named Styles' debut as the most impressive solo debut following a band breakup.

=== Year-end lists ===
Year-end lists for Harry Styles
Publication	List	Rank	Ref.
Billboard	50 Best Albums of 2017: Critics' Picks	10	
Complex	The Best Albums of 2017	33	
Esquire UK	The 50 Best Albums of 2017	—N/a	
Fuse	The 20 Best Albums of 2017	13	
Mashable	The 10 Best Albums of 2017	9	
Rolling Stone	50 Best Albums of 2017	17	
Rolling Stone	20 Best Pop Albums of 2017	5	
Time	The Top 10 Albums of 2017	6	
TRL	Top 20 Albums of the Year	20	
V	The 10 Best Albums of 2017	—N/a	
Variety	The Best Albums of 2017	—N/a	
The Village Voice	Pazz & Jop Music Critics Poll	52	
Melty	Best Pop Albums of the Year	9	

== Commercial performance ==
The album debuted atop the UK Albums Chart with first-week sales of 57,000 units, with Styles becoming the second One Direction member to achieve a number one solo album, following Zayn's Mind of Mine in April 2016. It debuted at number one on the US Billboard 200 with 230,000 album-equivalent units, of which 193,000 were pure album sales. It is the highest first sales week for a British male artist's debut full-length album since Nielsen SoundScan began in 1991. Selling 67,000 units in its second week, it fell down to number three.

The album was ranked number 22 on the list of the top 40 biggest albums of 2017 on the UK Album Chart. It was the fourth best selling album by a British artist worldwide in 2017. According to IFPI, it was the ninth best selling album of 2017, with 1 million copies shipped globally. The album was Sony Music's biggest global seller in the second quarter of 2017. It was the sixth best selling album of 2017 in Mexico.

"Sign of the Times" reached number one on the UK Singles Chart. In the US, the song debuted at number four on the Billboard Hot 100 The second single, "Two Ghosts", peaked at number 58 on the UK Singles Chart and number 34 on the US Mainstream Top 40 charts.

== Track listing ==
Harry Styles track listing
No.	Title	Writer(s)	Producer(s)	Length
1.	"Meet Me in the Hallway"	Harry Styles; Tyler Johnson; Mitch Rowland; Jeff Bhasker; Alex Salibian; Ryan Nasci	Johnson; Bhasker; Salibian	3:47
2.	"Sign of the Times"	Styles; Johnson; Rowland; Bhasker; Salibian; Nasci	Bhasker	5:40
3.	"Carolina"	Styles; Johnson; Rowland; Bhasker; Salibian; Nasci; Thomas Hull	Johnson; Bhasker; Salibian; Kid Harpoon	3:09
4.	"Two Ghosts"	Styles; Johnson; Rowland; John Ryan; Julian Bunetta	Johnson; Bhasker; Salibian	3:49
5.	"Sweet Creature"	Styles; Hull	Johnson; Bhasker; Salibian; Kid Harpoon	3:44
6.	"Only Angel"	Styles; Johnson; Rowland; Bhasker; Salibian; Nasci	Johnson; Bhasker; Salibian	4:51
7.	"Kiwi"	Styles; Johnson; Rowland; Bhasker; Salibian; Nasci	Johnson; Bhasker; Salibian	2:56
8.	"Ever Since New York"	Styles; Johnson; Rowland; Bhasker; Salibian; Nasci	Johnson; Bhasker; Salibian	4:13
9.	"Woman"	Styles; Johnson; Rowland; Bhasker; Salibian; Nasci	Johnson; Bhasker; Salibian	4:38
10.	"From the Dining Table"	Styles; Johnson; Rowland; Bhasker; Salibian; Nasci	Johnson; Bhasker; Salibian	3:31
Total length:				40:18

=== Note ===
- "Only Angel" contains a sample of dialogue from the film Barfly.

== Personnel ==
Credits adapted from the liner notes of Harry Styles.

=== Performers and musicians ===
- Harry Styles – vocals, background vocals, claps (track 6), guitar (track 4), omnichord (track 1, 4)
- Steve Aho – orchestrator / conductor / musician contractor (tracks 3, 6, 10)
- Erik Arvinder – violin (tracks 3, 6, 10)
- Jeffrey Azoff – background vocals (track 6), claps (track 6)
- Kala Balch – alto vocals (tracks 2, 6)
- Laurhan Beato – alto vocals (tracks 2, 6)
- Jeff Bhasker – background vocals (track 6), claps (track 6), keys (tracks 2, 6, 8), lap steel (track 2), moog (track 9), piano (tracks 1, 2, 5)
- Edie Lehmann Boddicker – gospel choirmaster (tracks 2, 6), alto (tracks 2, 6)
- Johnny Britt – tenor vocals (tracks 2, 6)
- Reid Bruton – bass-baritone vocals (tracks 2, 6)
- Caroline Buckman – viola (tracks 3, 6, 10)
- Charlean Carmon – soprano vocals (tracks 2, 6)
- Carmen Carter – soprano vocals (tracks 2, 6)
- Alvin Chea – bass-baritone vocals (tracks 2, 6)
- Monique Donnelly – soprano vocals (tracks 2, 6)
- Allie Feder – soprano vocals (tracks 2, 6)
- Vanessa Freebairn-Smith – cello (tracks 3, 6, 10)
- Jim Gilstrap – bass-baritone vocals (tracks 2, 6)
- Ira Glansbeek – cello (tracks 3, 6, 10)
- Taylor Graves – tenor vocals (tracks 2, 6)
- Kid Harpoon – background vocals (tracks 3, 5), bass (track 5), claps (track 3), guitar (track 5)
- Clydene Jackson – alto vocals (tracks 2, 6)
- Tyler Johnson – background vocals (tracks 6 and 7), claps (track 6), keys (track 4), piano (track 3)
- Keri Larson – soprano vocals (tracks 2, 6)
- Songa Lee – violin (tracks 3, 6 and 10)
- David Loucks – tenor vocals (tracks 2, 6)
- Jamie McCrary – tenor vocals (tracks 2, 6)
- Ryan Nasci – bass (tracks 1–4, 6–9), lap steel (track 3)
- Diane Reynolds – soprano vocals (tracks 2, 6)
- Mitch Rowland – acoustic guitar (track 10), background vocals (tracks 3, 6 and 7), claps (track 6), cowbell (track 6), electric guitar (track 3), guitar (tracks 1, 2, 4, 6–9), drums (tracks 1–4, 6–9)
- Alex Salibian – acoustic guitar (track 3), background vocals (tracks 6 and 7), claps (tracks 3, 6), keys (tracks 3, 8 and 9), piano (tracks 3, 8 and 9)
- Aretha Scruggs – alto vocals (tracks 2, 6)
- Fletcher Sheridan – tenor vocals (tracks 2, 6)
- Katie Sloan – violin (tracks 3, 6 and 10)
- Carmen Twillie – tenor vocals (tracks 2, 6)
- Ina Veli – violin (tracks 3, 6 and 10)
- Julia Waters – soprano vocals (tracks 2, 6)
- Oren Waters – tenor vocals (tracks 2, 6)
- Will Wheaton – bass-baritone vocals (tracks 2, 6)
- Michael Whitson – viola (tracks 3, 6 and 10)
- Baraka Williams – alto vocals (tracks 2, 6)
- Eyvonne Williams – alto vocals (tracks 2, 6)

=== Production ===
- Jeff Bhasker – executive production, production (tracks 1–4, 6–10), additional production (track 5)
- Matt Dyson – assistant engineering
- Chris Gehringer – mastering
- Kid Harpoon – production (tracks 3, 5), engineering (track 5)
- Tyler Johnson – production (tracks 1, 3, 4, 6–10), co-production (track 2), additional production (track 5), programming (track 3)
- Ryan Nasci – engineering, mixing (tracks 1, 4, 10)
- Alex Salibian – production (tracks 1, 3, 4, 6–10), co-production (track 2), additional production (track 5)
- Mark "Spike" Stent – mixing (tracks 2, 3, 5–9)

=== Design ===
- Calvin Aurand – specialty packaging photography
- Jacob Hassett – graphic design
- Molly Hawkins – creative director
- Harley Weir – photography

== Charts ==
=== Weekly charts ===
Weekly chart performance for Harry Styles
Chart (2017–2021)	Peak position
Argentine Albums (CAPIF)	1
Australian Albums (ARIA)	1
Austrian Albums (Ö3 Austria)	2
Belgian Albums (Ultratop Flanders)	1
Belgian Albums (Ultratop Wallonia)	3
Canadian Albums (Billboard)	1
Croatian International Albums (HDU)	4
Czech Albums (ČNS IFPI)	1
Danish Albums (Hitlisten)	4
Dutch Albums (Album Top 100)	1
Finnish Albums (Suomen virallinen lista)	3
French Albums (SNEP)	2
German Albums (Offizielle Top 100)	5
Greek Albums (IFPI Greece)	1
Hungarian Albums (MAHASZ)	6
Irish Albums (IRMA)	1
Italian Albums (FIMI)	2
Japanese Albums (Oricon)	16
Latvian Albums (LaIPA)	18
Mexican Albums (AMPROFON)	1
New Zealand Albums (RMNZ)	2
Norwegian Albums (VG-lista)	2
Polish Albums (ZPAV)	1
Portuguese Albums (AFP)	1
Scottish Albums (Official Charts)	1
Slovak Albums (ČNS IFPI)	1
South Korean Albums (Circle)	33
South Korean International Albums (Circle)	1
Spanish Albums (Promusicae)	1
Swedish Albums (Sverigetopplistan)	3
Swiss Albums (Romandie)	1
Swiss Albums (Schweizer Hitparade)	3
UK Albums (Official Charts)	1
US Billboard 200	1
US Indie Store Album Sales (Billboard)	3

=== Monthly charts ===
Monthly chart performance for Harry Styles
Chart (2017)	Peak position
Argentine Monthly Albums (CAPIF)	4

=== Year-end charts ===
2017 year-end chart performance for Harry Styles
Chart (2017)	Position
Australian Albums (ARIA)	11
Austrian Albums (Ö3 Austria)	54
Belgian Albums (Ultratop Flanders)	38
Belgian Albums (Ultratop Wallonia)	106
Canadian Albums (Billboard)	30
Danish Albums (Hitlisten)	65
Dutch Albums (MegaCharts)	37
French Albums (SNEP)	144
Hungarian Albums (MAHASZ)	61
Icelandic Albums (Tónlistinn)	38
Italian Albums (FIMI)	35
Mexican Albums (AMPROFON)	6
New Zealand Albums (RMNZ)	19
Norwegian Albums (IFPI Norge)	42
Polish Albums (ZPAV)	61
Spanish Albums (PROMUSICAE)	34
Swedish Albums (Sverigetopplistan)	46
Swiss Albums (Schweizer Hitparade)	79
UK Albums (OCC)	22
US Billboard 200	39
Worldwide	9

2018 year-end chart performance for Harry Styles
Chart (2018)	Position
Belgian Albums (Ultratop Flanders)	90
Icelandic Albums (Tónlistinn)	72
Mexican Albums (AMPROFON)	93
Swedish Albums (Sverigetopplistan)	94

2020 year-end chart performance for Harry Styles
Chart (2020)	Position
Australian Albums (ARIA)	54
Belgian Albums (Ultratop Flanders)	50
Dutch Albums (Album Top 100)	77
Hungarian Albums (MAHASZ)	100
Icelandic Albums (Tónlistinn)	46
Irish Albums (IRMA)	48
Swedish Albums (Sverigetopplistan)	69
UK Albums (OCC)	89

2021 year-end chart performance for Harry Styles
Chart (2021)	Position
Australian Albums (ARIA)	47
Austrian Albums (Ö3 Austria)	64
Belgian Albums (Ultratop Flanders)	47
Dutch Albums (Album Top 100)	44
Hungarian Albums (MAHASZ)	94
Icelandic Albums (Tónlistinn)	42
Italian Albums (FIMI)	73
Swedish Albums (Sverigetopplistan)	77
US Billboard 200	137

2022 year-end chart performance for Harry Styles
Chart (2022)	Position
Australian Albums (ARIA)	37
Austrian Albums (Ö3 Austria)	52
Belgian Albums (Ultratop Flanders)	34
Dutch Albums (Album Top 100)	32
Lithuanian Albums (AGATA)	48
Icelandic Albums (Tónlistinn)	37
Swedish Albums (Sverigetopplistan)	86
UK Albums (OCC)	64
US Billboard 200	156

2023 year-end chart performance for Harry Styles
Chart (2023)	Position
Australian Albums (ARIA)	64
Belgian Albums (Ultratop Flanders)	61
Dutch Albums (Album Top 100)	63

2024 year-end chart performance for Harry Styles
Chart (2024)	Position
Belgian Albums (Ultratop Flanders)	141

== Certifications ==
Region	Certification	Certified units/sales
Australia (ARIA)	2× Platinum	140,000^{‡}
Austria (IFPI Austria)	Gold	7,500^{‡}
Belgium (BRMA)	Gold	15,000^{‡}
Brazil (Pro-Música Brasil)	Diamond	160,000^{‡}
Canada (Music Canada)	Platinum	80,000^{‡}
Denmark (IFPI Danmark)	Platinum	20,000^{‡}
France (SNEP)	Platinum	100,000^{‡}
Germany (BVMI)	Gold	100,000^{‡}
Iceland (FHF)	Gold	3,227
Italy (FIMI)	2× Platinum	100,000^{‡}
Mexico (AMPROFON)	3× Platinum	180,000^{‡}
Netherlands (NVPI)	Gold	20,000^{‡}
New Zealand (RMNZ)	2× Platinum	30,000^{‡}
Norway (IFPI Norway)	Gold	10,000^{‡}
Poland (ZPAV)	3× Platinum	60,000^{‡}
Portugal (AFP)	Gold	7,500^{^}
Singapore (RIAS)	Gold	5,000^{*}
Sweden (GLF)	Gold	15,000^{‡}
Switzerland (IFPI Switzerland)	Gold	10,000^{‡}
United Kingdom (BPI)	2× Platinum	600,000^{‡}
United States (RIAA)	2× Platinum	2,000,000^{‡}
Summaries
Worldwide	—	1,000,000
^{*} Sales figures based on certification alone.^{^} Shipments figures based on certification alone.^{‡} Sales+streaming figures based on certification alone.

== See also ==
- List of Billboard 200 number-one albums of 2017
- List of number-one albums of 2017 (Australia)
- List of number-one albums of 2017 (Belgium)
- List of number-one albums of 2017 (Ireland)
- List of number-one albums of 2017 (Poland)
- List of number-one albums of 2017 (Spain)
- List of UK Albums Chart number ones of the 2010s
