= Two Ghosts =

Single by Harry Styles

from the album Harry Styles
- Released: 7 August 2017
- Studio: Gee Jam (Port Antonio, Jamaica); The Village (Los Angeles, California)
- Genre: Folk rock
- Length: 3:49
- Label: Erskine; Columbia
- Songwriters: Harry Styles; John Ryan; Julian Bunetta; Mitch Rowland; Tyler Johnson
- Producers: Jeff Bhasker; Alex Salibian; Johnson

Harry Styles singles chronology
"Sign of the Times" (2017)	"Two Ghosts" (2017)	"Kiwi" (2017)

"Two Ghosts" is a song recorded by English singer-songwriter Harry Styles for his self-titled debut studio album. The song was written by Styles, John Ryan, Julian Bunetta, Mitch Rowland, and Tyler Johnson and its production was handled by Jeff Bhasker, Alex Salibian, and Johnson. It was released as the second single from the album to US adult contemporary radio by Columbia Records on 7 August 2017, and to pop radio the next day.

== Composition ==
"Two Ghosts" is a country-influenced folk rock ballad. Performed on slide guitar, the track leans toward country folk. Lyrically, it is about a relationship that did not last and the singer trying to reclaim his sense of humanity after its end, according to critics. An editor from Entertainment Weekly interpreted the song as a "mournful acoustic autopsy of love lost." Written in the key of E major and set in a common time signature, it has a relatively slow tempo of 70 beats per minute.

== Critical reception ==
Leonie Cooper of NME opined the "subtle" song offers up a "country-indebted Laurel Canyon sound." In Pitchfork, Jamieson Cox considered Styles "makes a convincing alt-country troubadour" on the song. Anjali Raguraman of The Straits Times thought the "sombre, country-tinged" track lyrically borrows from Pink Floyd's "Wish You Were Here". In the Los Angeles Times, Mikael Wood commented that the song has "the slow-rolling swagger of The Rolling Stones' "Tumbling Dice." In Consequence of Sound, David Sackllah noted the slide guitar "could fit on Ryan Adams' Gold." Chicago Tribune's Greg Kot wrote "forlorn references drop to the Allman Brothers' "Melissa" on the song." Annie Zaleski of The A.V. Club wrote it "acutely captures the discomfiting, empty feeling of realizing that the spark is gone."

Kitty Empire of The Guardian said it "packs some good writing." Allan Raible in ABC News found the song influenced by George Harrison's "All Things Must Pass." Rob Sheffield of Rolling Stone thought the "lovelorn" song "could pass for vintage Bread". Eve Barlow of Variety believed "it's very easy to imagine an extended hyper emotional scene from The Notebook in the background" while listening to the "tragic, mystifying tale." In a similar way, David Dunn of The National thought its "plaintive" hooks and "easy-going" strum helps the song fits in a "teary" scene of Grey's Anatomy. BBC Music reporter Mark Savage noted references to Taylor Swift's "Style" in the storied lyrics; Pitchfork's Cox stated the song "only succeeds because it leans" on these references. In an interview with Nick Grimshaw on BBC Radio 1, Styles said in response to whether the song was about Swift: "I think it's pretty self-explanatory."

Billboard's critics' list placed it seventh on "Every One Direction Solo Single, Ranked" in May 2017, stating "a plaintive strummer in the mold of Beck at his most contemplative or Ryan Adams at his most hungover, "Two Ghosts" is largely underplayed and undeniably effective [...] Not as grand or as riotous as some of Harry Styles' more obvious highlights, but sweetly winning all the same."

== Live performances ==
On 17 May 2017, Styles performed "Two Ghosts" on The Late Late Show with James Corden, accompanying himself on acoustic guitar. In Rolling Stone, Elias Leight opined the singer demonstrated "impressive" vocal range, contorting his voice into a "bruising" rasp and a "light, angsty" falsetto moments later. On 9 June, Styles performed the song from the rooftop of London venue Central Hall Westminster on The Late Late Show.

== Charts ==
Chart (2017)	Peak position
Belgium (Ultratip Bubbling Under Flanders)	5
Canada Hot 100 (Billboard)	91
Ireland (IRMA)	66
Mexico Ingles Airplay (Billboard)	9
Portugal (AFP)	94
Scottish Singles Sales (Official Charts)	77
Slovakia Airplay (ČNS IFPI)	71
Slovakia Singles Digital (ČNS IFPI)	86
UK Singles (Official Charts)	58
US Bubbling Under Hot 100 (Billboard)	18
US Adult Pop Airplay (Billboard)	32
US Pop Airplay (Billboard)	34

== Certifications ==
Region	Certification	Certified units/sales
Australia (ARIA)	Platinum	70,000^{‡}
Brazil (Pro-Música Brasil)	Platinum	60,000^{‡}
Canada (Music Canada)	Gold	40,000^{‡}
Mexico (AMPROFON)	Platinum	60,000^{‡}
New Zealand (RMNZ)	Platinum	30,000^{‡}
United Kingdom (BPI)	Gold	400,000^{‡}
United States (RIAA)	Platinum	1,000,000^{‡}
^{‡} Sales+streaming figures based on certification alone.

== Release history ==
Region	Date	Format(s)	Label(s)	Ref.
United States	7 August 2017	Hot adult contemporary	Columbia	
United States	8 August 2017	Contemporary hit radio	Columbia	
United Kingdom	1 September 2017	Contemporary hit radio	Columbia	
Italy	8 September 2017	Contemporary hit radio	Sony	
