= Mitch Rowland =

American songwriter and instrumentalist

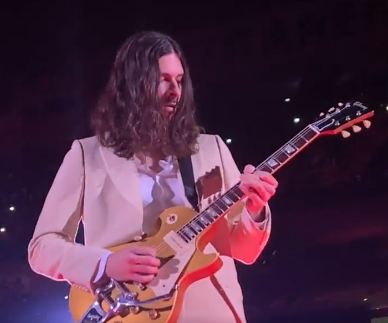
- Rowland in 2021

Background information
- Born: Mitchell Kristopher Rowland; July 13, 1989 (age 37)
- Origin: Dublin, Ohio, U.S.
- Genres: Pop, indie rock, alternative rock
- Occupations: Musician, singer-songwriter
- Instruments: Vocals; drums; bass; percussion; guitar
- Years active: 2014–present
- Labels: Erskine; Giant
- Member of: Harry Styles

Mitchell Kristopher Rowland is an American songwriter and multi-instrumentalist, best known for his work as a touring guitarist and for co-writing songs on three of Harry Styles's solo albums. "Watermelon Sugar", a song he co-wrote with Styles, Tyler Johnson, and Thomas Hull, won Best Pop Solo Performance at the 63rd Annual Grammy Awards in 2021. Rowland, along with Styles, Johnson, and Hull, also won the Brit Award for Song of the Year for "Watermelon Sugar" at the 2021 Brit Awards.

== Early life and education ==
Rowland grew up 15 miles outside of Columbus, Ohio in the city of Dublin, Ohio. He played in the jazz band at Dublin Coffman High School. After attending college at the University of Cincinnati, he played drums for the indie rock band Lionel the Jailbird. After leaving Lionel the Jailbird, he played in the band Total Navajo with audio engineer Ryan Nasci.

== Career ==
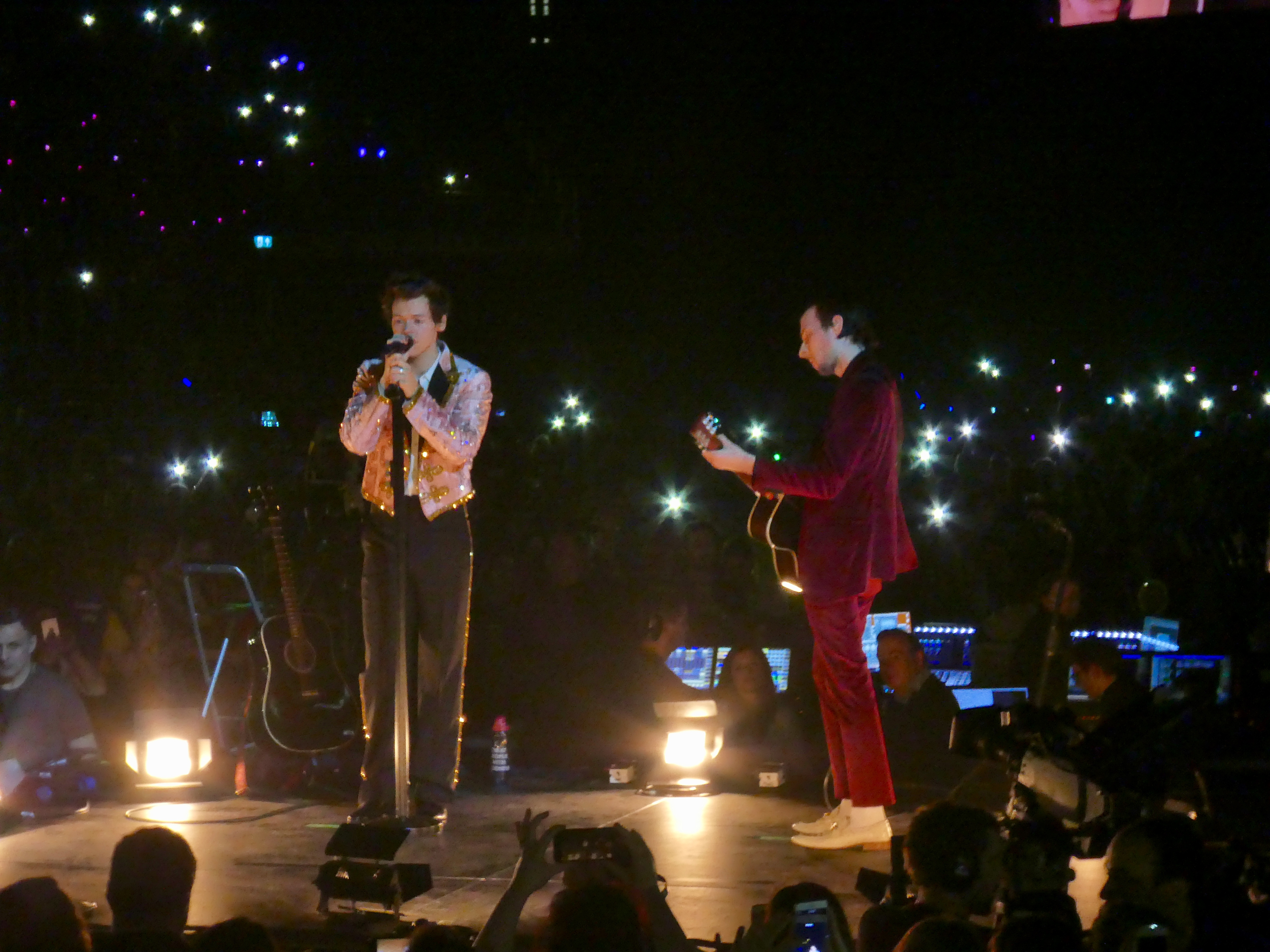
Styles (left) and Rowland (right) playing London's O2 Arena in 2018

Ryan Nasci was the audio engineer on tracks for the album that would become Harry Styles when a session guitarist dropped out last-minute. He contacted Rowland, who he was also rooming with at the time, about whether or not he would be interested in the gig. According to Styles, Rowland had never been in a studio before. Rowland ultimately co-wrote and played guitar and percussion for nine songs on Harry Styles, including Styles's debut single, "Sign of the Times", which debuted at number four on the Billboard Hot 100. After the album's release, he accompanied Styles as lead guitarist in his band for Harry Styles: Live on Tour. According to Styles's then-music director and producer Thomas Hull, Rowland had "never toured like [that] before" so he was having to "learn on the road." In September 2017, Rowland, Styles, and producers Tyler Johnson and Thomas Hull (also known as Kid Harpoon), recorded "Watermelon Sugar" in Nashville on a day off from Live on Tour.

Following Live on Tour, Rowland co-wrote five additional songs on Styles's second album, Fine Line, including the single "Golden", which eventually peaked at number 57 on the Billboard Hot 100. He also did session work for the album on electric guitar, drums, slide guitar, acoustic guitar, glockenspiel, and background vocals. Rowland's guitar solo in the song "She", which was (according to Styles) written while they were both under the influence of psychedelic mushrooms, has been praised by Rob Sheffield from Rolling Stone as "a cosmic guitar voyage". Fine Line was nominated for Album of the Year at the 2020 Brit Awards, and for Best Pop Vocal Album at the 2021 Grammy Awards. "Watermelon Sugar" received a Grammy Award for Best Pop Solo Performance and a Brit Award for British Single of the Year. In 2020, Rolling Stone ranked Fine Line number 491 on its list of the 500 Greatest Albums of All Time, making it the most recent album to be included. All three songs mentioned in the Rolling Stone list as album highlights were co-written by Rowland.

Harry Styles: Love on Tour was initially supposed to start April 2020, but was postponed due to the COVID-19 pandemic. Styles stayed with Rowland and his wife, Sarah Jones, during parts of the pandemic. Before tour started again, Styles and Rowland co-wrote "Music for a Sushi Restaurant" and "Keep Driving" together. Rowland also co-wrote two songs on Cam's 2020 album The Otherside: "Forgetting You" and "Happier for You". He also did session work on the album, playing drums, acoustic guitar, electric guitar, and mallets. When Love on Tour started again in 2021, Rowland played guitar. In January 2021, Rowland appeared as himself in Styles's music video for the song "Treat People With Kindness". Styles's third album, Harry's House, released on May 20, 2022. In addition to his writing credits on the album, Rowland also did session work playing guitar, bass, percussion, and drums. "Music for a Sushi Restaurant" debuted at number 8 on the Billboard Hot 100, marking Rowland's third top-ten hit as a songwriter.

On July 20, 2023 it was announced that Mitch Rowland's debut album Come June was released October 6, 2023 via Giant Records / Erskine Records. This will be the first record released on the Erskine Records imprint from an act other than Harry Styles. First single of the same name, "Come June" premiered with accompanying sun soaked video. Second single "Bluebells", was written "after finding out my wife and I were having a baby," Rowland says.

Rowlands sophomore album Whistling Pie was released on September 12, 2025 via Giant Records / Erskine Records.

== Personal life ==
Rowland is married to English drummer Sarah Jones. Jones and Rowland met while rehearsing for Harry Styles: Live on Tour together. Their first child was born in March 2021. Their second child arrived in summer 2024 Rowland and Jones split their time between the UK and LA.

== Discography ==
Year	Artist	Album	Notes
2014	Total Navajo	Eyelids EP	Co-Writer
2017	Harry Styles	Harry Styles	Co-Writer
2019	Harry Styles	Fine Line	Co-Writer
2020	Cam	The Otherside	Co-Writer
2022	Harry Styles	Harry's House	Co-Writer
2023	Himself	Come June	
2025	Himself	Whistling Pie	

== Filmography ==
Year	Title	Role	Notes
2017	Harry Styles: Behind the Album	Himself	Documentary
