= Sign of the Times (Harry Styles song) =

2017 single by Harry Styles

Single by Harry Styles

from the album Harry Styles
- B-side: "From the Dining Table"
- Released: 7 April 2017
- Recorded: 18 July 2016
- Studio: Gee Jam (Port Antonio, Jamaica); The Village (Los Angeles, California)
- Genre: Pop rock; soft rock
- Length: 5:40 (album version); 4:07 (radio edit)
- Label: Erskine; Columbia
- Songwriters: Harry Styles; Jeff Bhasker; Mitch Rowland; Ryan Nasci; Alex Salibian; Tyler Johnson
- Producers: Bhasker; Salibian (co.); Johnson (co.)

Harry Styles singles chronology
"Sign of the Times" (2017)	"Two Ghosts" (2017)

Music video
- "Sign of the Times" on YouTube

"Sign of the Times" is the debut solo single by British singer-songwriter Harry Styles from his first solo album, Harry Styles. Released on 7 April 2017 by Columbia Records, the song was initially written by Jeff Bhasker, Mitch Rowland, Ryan Nasci, Alex Salibian, with Styles earning songwriter credit by contributing. It was produced by Bhasker and co-produced by Salibian and Johnson. Musically, it was described by critics as a pop rock and soft rock ballad. Its accompanying music video was released on 8 May 2017.

"Sign of the Times" peaked at the top of the UK Singles Chart and number four in the United States. In 2018, the single won a BMI Pop Award, and the video won a Brit Award for British Artist Video of the Year. In 2021, Rolling Stone placed it at number 428 on its list of The 500 Greatest Songs of All Time.

== Background and release ==
Rumours about Styles embarking on a solo career sparked in 2015, when it was reported that Sony Music wanted Styles to release a solo album during One Direction's hiatus. By the end of 2015, four new songs written and performed by Styles were registered on the ASCAP online database, which was believed to be for his potential debut solo album at the time. Shortly after, Styles signed with American agent Jeffrey Azoff and inked a record contract with Columbia Records. In September 2016, Styles appeared on the cover of Another Man, which led to media speculation about a new album on the horizon.

In February 2017, the CEO of Columbia Records, Rob Stringer, revealed that the album was close to being finished and called it "authentic". A month later, it was reported that the album sounded like David Bowie and Queen, and was later revealed to have been executively produced by Grammy award-winning producer Jeff Bhasker (Kanye West, Fun, Mark Ronson). The same report also hinted that the lead single would be released in late April or early May and sounded "like it would be a smash in any decade". The same month, US radio host Elvis Duran accidentally revealed during his show that Styles' debut single would be released on 7 April 2017. On 25 March, Styles teased the new single with a television ad during The Voice UK. On 31 March, the singer revealed through social media that his single is titled "Sign of the Times". On 7 April, the song premiered during Nick Grimshaw's breakfast show on BBC Radio 1.

== Composition ==
The song is a pop rock, soft rock, piano ballad, with glam rock influences. According to Billboard, it "folds in psychedelic soul, indie rock and spacey pop". The "apocalyptic" power ballad shows influences from '70s British rock. The track was co-written by Jeff Bhasker, Alex Salibian and Tyler Johnson. Also credited were Mitch Rowland, Ryan Nasci, and Styles (who received the top credit). Rowland played guitar and drums, Nasci the bass, and Bhasker the piano, keyboard and lap steel parts. A 25 voice choir provided harmonies throughout the song. The track was recorded at Village Studios in Los Angeles and Geejam Hotel Recording Studio in Port Antonio, Jamaica, and was mixed by Spike Stent. "Sign of the Times" is composed in the key of F major and set in a 4/4 time signature at a moderately slow tempo of 60 beats per minute.

The idea of the song was conceived by Styles while playing chords on the piano in Jamaica. Styles explained to Rolling Stone that "The song is written from a point of view as if a mother was giving birth to a child and there's a complication. The mother is told, 'The child is fine, but you're not going to make it.' The mother has five minutes to tell the child, 'Go forth and conquer.'" The entire song was cut in three hours according to Bhasker, who called it "an instant classic-sounding record from conception to completion".

== Music video ==
Directed by Yoann Lemoine, the song's music video was released and uploaded on YouTube on 8 May 2017. It features Styles singing in a meadow, flying in the skies, and walking on water. A writer from USA Today humorously described Styles as "auditioning to be Marvel Comics next superhero or in a new biblical epic". It was filmed on the Isle of Skye in Scotland. The video's stunt pilot, Will Banks, stated that Styles flew more than 1,550 feet high (470 meters) during the shoot. Banks also claimed that no green screen or CGI effects were employed during filming.

The music video won British Artist Video of the Year at the 2018 Brit Awards and Best Music Video at the 2018 iHeartRadio Music Awards. It was nominated for two awards at the 2017 MTV Video Music Awards: Best Pop Video and Best Visual Effects.

== Accolades ==
Awards and nominations for "Sign of the Times"
Organization	Year	Category	Result	Ref.
MTV Video Music Awards	2017	Best Pop Video	Nominated	
MTV Video Music Awards	2017	Best Visual Effects	Nominated	
Nickelodeon Brazil Kids' Choice Awards	2017	Favorite International Hit	Nominated	
Nickelodeon Brazil Kids' Choice Awards	2017	Favorite International Music Video	Nominated	
Rockbjörnen	2017	The year's foreign song	Nominated	
Teen Choice Awards	2017	Choice Song: Male Artist	Nominated	
BMI Pop Awards	2018	Pop Award	Won	
Brit Awards	2018	British Artist Video of the Year	Won	
iHeartRadio Music Awards	2018	Best Music Video	Won	
Myx Music Awards	2018	International Video of the Year	Nominated	

== Critical reception ==
"Sign of the Times" received critical acclaim. Billboard's Gil Kaufman wrote, "Styles appears to be both showing his range and making a clear effort to step boldly away from the manufactured, plastic pop of his past". Kaufman opined that the song "rakes in influences from Pink Floyd and David Bowie to Queen, Spacehog, Suede, Coldplay, the Beatles, Eric Carmen and Prince". Also for Billboard, Jason Lipshutz described the song as "resolute, determined, wholly committed to its messaging and sound, radio trends be damned. Although it wears its influences on its sleeve (Bowie) nothing about this single bends toward someone else's expectations". Other critics have compared the song to the music of American indie rock band the Walkmen, to Fun's "We Are Young" and Coldplay's "The Scientist", and to Britpop anthems like Blur's "Tender" or the Verve's "Bitter Sweet Symphony".

Brittany Spanos of Rolling Stone asserted that the song "[aligns] with the Seventies-inspired pop-rock of One Direction's more recent albums like Made in the A.M.". Anjali Raguraman from The Straits Times considered it the "strongest" track on the album, saying "the conviction of his delivery is beyond his years". In The Atlantic, Spencer Kornhaber opined that the song "continues with One Direction's po-mo project of recycling classic-rock sounds as bubblegum," and added that Styles is "embracing such sounds with more abandon". After the song was released on the 30th anniversary of Prince's Sign o' the Times, Spin's Andy Cush commented, "it's clear that this is Styles's attempt to distinguish himself as an artist with real depth. But the music itself has almost nothing to do with Prince–instead, think Oasis, Elton John at his most bombastic, '70s John Lennon". Cush added that the song "has only those three chords, and it goes straight for cruising altitude with an onslaught of cymbals and guitar on the first chorus, expecting you to be moved without pausing to consider why".

Billboard's critics' list placed it first on "Every One Direction Solo Single, Ranked" in May 2017. Rolling Stone ranked it as the best song released in 2017. Billboard staff considered it the eighth best song of the year and the best rock song of the year. Pitchfork ranked it as the 87th best song of 2017, while Spin staff ranked it as the 13th best boy-band solo debut single. In 2018, Rolling Stone ranked it 49th among the 100 Greatest Songs of the Century So Far.

== Commercial performance ==
"Sign of the Times" reached number one on the UK Singles Chart with a combined sales of 62,900 units. In its first week, it recorded 39,000 digital downloads combined with 3.5 million streams that give 23,472 equivalent units, ending Ed Sheeran's run of 13 consecutive weeks at the top of the chart with "Shape of You". In the United States, the song debuted at number four on the Billboard Hot 100. In its first week, it sold 142,000 copies (topping Digital Songs), earned 16.5 million streams and 23 million airplay impressions. The song was at the time Styles' highest-charting single on the chart. It managed to hit the number one in record time on the US iTunes charts, reaching the top in 19 minutes, beating Adele's previous record at 50 minutes. It was certified platinum in the country, making it the top certified rock song of 2017, according to RIAA. It ranked number nine on the Most Shazamed Songs of 2017. "Sign of the Times" appeared on Shazam's Hall of Fame, the most Shazamed songs of all time, at 100.

== Legacy ==
Kygo and Ellie Goulding performed a cover of the song on BBC Radio 1's Live Lounge. Hanson performed a cover on KIIS 106.5. Paul Cardall made a classical cover of the song. Alex Boyé released an 'Africanized' orchestral cover. Sabrina Carpenter collaborated with YouTube star Jasmine Thompson on a cover. LANY released their recordings for Spotify's new Singles series which included a cover of "Sign of the Times".

"Sign of the Times" was used for a commercial ad for Google released in December 2017 in the United States, under the title of Google: Year In Search 2017. In 2018 it was one of the early Olympics Brand Synchs for 2018, airing throughout Europe, Asia, the U.S. and parts of Africa. It was also used as a scene for the 2024 superhero film Kraven the Hunter.

A version of the song was used in the 2026 feature film Project Hail Mary, in a scene in which Sandra Hüller's character Eva Stratt performs it during a karaoke gathering. The song was also used in a trailer for the film.

== Live performances ==
Styles performed the song for the first time on 15 April 2017 episode of Saturday Night Live's 42nd season. On 21 April, Harry appeared on the BBC's The Graham Norton Show, for his debut solo performance in his native UK. He performed it live on the French talk show, Quotidien, on 26 April 2017. He also performed the song on The Today Show on 9 May, and on The Late Late Show with James Corden on 15 May.

On 11 September, he performed it on BBC Live Lounge. On 2 November, Styles performed the song at the BBC studio. On 9 November, he performed the song on X Factor Italy.

== Charts ==
=== Weekly charts ===
Chart (2017)	Peak position
Argentina Airplay (Monitor Latino)	10
Australia (ARIA)	1
Austria (Ö3 Austria Top 40)	2
Belgium (Ultratop 50 Flanders)	8
Belgium (Ultratop 50 Wallonia)	4
Brazil Hot 100 (Billboard)	4
Canada Hot 100 (Billboard)	6
Canada AC (Billboard)	7
Canada CHR/Top 40 (Billboard)	14
Canada Hot AC (Billboard)	6
Colombia Airplay (National-Report)	83
Croatia International Airplay (Top lista)	1
Czech Republic Airplay (ČNS IFPI)	9
Czech Republic Singles Digital (ČNS IFPI)	5
Denmark (Tracklisten)	20
Euro Digital Song Sales (Billboard)	1
Finland Download (Latauslista)	1
France (SNEP)	48
Germany (GfK)	20
Hungary (Rádiós Top 40)	31
Hungary (Single Top 40)	5
Ireland (IRMA)	6
Italy (FIMI)	9
Japan (Japan Hot 100)	72
Lebanon (Lebanese Top 20)	8
Malaysia (RIM)	14
Mexico Airplay (Billboard)	3
Netherlands (Dutch Top 40)	16
Netherlands (Single Top 100)	26
New Zealand (Recorded Music NZ)	6
Norway (VG-lista)	20
Paraguay Airplay (Monitor Latino)	11
Philippines (Philippine Hot 100)	52
Poland Airplay (ZPAV)	1
Portugal (AFP)	6
Scottish Singles Sales (Official Charts)	1
Slovakia Airplay (ČNS IFPI)	5
Slovakia Singles Digital (ČNS IFPI)	2
Slovenia Airplay (SloTop50)	15
Spain (Promusicae)	51
Sweden (Sverigetopplistan)	15
Switzerland (Schweizer Hitparade)	4
UK Singles (Official Charts)	1
Uruguay Airplay (Monitor Latino)	9
US Billboard Hot 100	4
US Adult Alternative Airplay (Billboard)	25
US Adult Contemporary (Billboard)	21
US Adult Pop Airplay (Billboard)	12
US Pop Airplay (Billboard)	12

Chart (2022–2026)	Peak position
Global 200 (Billboard)	40

=== Year-end charts ===
Chart (2017)	Position
Argentina Airplay (Monitor Latino)	31
Australia (ARIA)	56
Austria (Ö3 Austria Top 40)	36
Belgium (Ultratop Flanders)	20
Belgium (Ultratop Wallonia)	13
Canada (Canadian Hot 100)	48
France (SNEP)	140
Germany (Official German Charts)	75
Hungary (Single Top 40)	63
Hungary (Stream Top 40)	97
Iceland (Tónlistinn)	21
Israel International Airplay (Media Forest)	28
Italy (FIMI)	58
Latvia Airplay (LaIPA)	34
Netherlands (Dutch Top 40)	92
Poland Airplay (ZPAV)	42
Portugal (AFP)	48
Slovenia Airplay (SloTop50)	36
Spain (Promusicae)	37
Switzerland (Schweizer Hitparade)	21
UK Singles (OCC)	56
US Billboard Hot 100	87

== Certifications ==
Region	Certification	Certified units/sales
Australia (ARIA)	7× Platinum	490,000^{‡}
Austria (IFPI Austria)	Platinum	30,000^{‡}
Belgium (BRMA)	Platinum	20,000^{‡}
Brazil (Pro-Música Brasil)	2× Diamond	500,000^{‡}
Canada (Music Canada)	4× Platinum	320,000^{‡}
Denmark (IFPI Danmark)	Platinum	90,000^{‡}
France (SNEP)	Diamond	333,333^{‡}
Germany (BVMI)	Platinum	400,000^{‡}
Italy (FIMI)	2× Platinum	100,000^{‡}
Mexico (AMPROFON)	3× Diamond+2× Platinum+Gold	1,050,000^{‡}
New Zealand (RMNZ)	6× Platinum	180,000^{‡}
Norway (IFPI Norway)	Platinum	60,000^{‡}
Poland (ZPAV)	3× Platinum	150,000^{‡}
Portugal (AFP)	4× Platinum	100,000^{‡}
Spain (Promusicae)	2× Platinum	120,000^{‡}
Switzerland (IFPI Switzerland)	2× Platinum	40,000^{‡}
United Kingdom (BPI)	4× Platinum	2,400,000^{‡}
United States (RIAA)	5× Platinum	5,000,000^{‡}
Streaming
Greece (IFPI Greece)	2× Platinum	4,000,000^{†}
Sweden (GLF)	2× Platinum	16,000,000^{†}
^{‡} Sales+streaming figures based on certification alone.^{†} Streaming-only figures based on certification alone.

== Release history ==
Region	Date	Format	Label	Ref.
Various	7 April 2017	Digital download; streaming	Erskine; Columbia	
