= Cam discography =

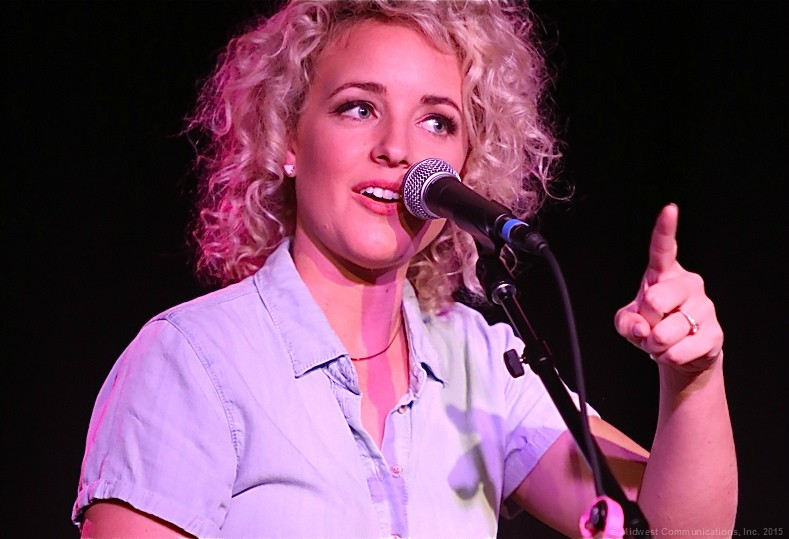
- Cam performing live in concert, 2015.
- Studio albums: 4
- EPs: 1
- Singles: 7
- Music videos: 5
- Promotional singles: 4
- Other appearances: 3

The discography of American country music artist Cam contains four studio albums, one extended play, seven singles, five music videos, four promotional singles and three additional album appearances. Under her birth name, "Camaron Ochs", she released her debut studio album, Heartforward, in 2010. Shortening her professional name to "Cam", she released an independent single in 2013 titled "Down This Road". The song helped her sign her first recording contract with Arista Records in 2015. Along with the single, "My Mistake", Cam issued the extended play Welcome to Cam Country in early 2015. Among other peak positions, the extended play reached number 31 on the Billboard Top Country Albums chart.

It was her next single, "Burning House", that became Cam's first major hit. The single peaked in the top five of the Billboard Hot Country Songs chart and Country Airplay chart. In December 2015, Cam's second studio album was released. Entitled Untamed, the album peaked at number 2 on the Billboard country albums chart and number 12 on the Billboard 200 list.

In 2016, "Mayday" was spawned as the second single from Cam's 2015 studio album. Her next single release was 2017's "Diane". The song reached minor positions on the Billboard charts, reaching number 43 on the country songs list. Departing from the Arista label, Cam switched to a new record label in 2018. Her first release with a new label would be "Road to Happiness". In 2020 she released the single, "Till There's Nothing Left".

== Albums ==
=== Studio albums ===
List of studio albums, with selected chart positions, showing other relevant details
Title	Album details	Peak chart positions				Sales	Certifications
Title	Album details	US	US Cou.	AUS	CAN	Sales	Certifications
Heartforward	Released: January 26, 2010; Label: Rubber Room; Formats: CD, music download	—	—	—	—		
Untamed	Released: December 11, 2015; Label: Arista Nashville; Formats: CD, music download	12	2	61	43	US: 142,200	RIAA: Gold
The Otherside	Released: October 30, 2020; Label: RCA/Triple Tigers; Formats: CD, music download	195	19	—	—		
All Things Light	Scheduled: July 18, 2025; Label: RCA/Triple Tigers; Format: CD, music download	To be released					
"—" denotes a recording that did not chart or was not released in that territory.

== Extended plays ==
List of extended plays, with selected chart positions, showing other relevant details
Title	Album details	Peak chart positions			Sales
Title	Album details	US	US Coun.	US Heat	Sales
Welcome to Cam Country	Released: March 31, 2015; Label: Arista Nashville; Formats: CD, music download	88	31	5	US: 26,000

== Singles ==
=== As lead artist ===
List of singles, with selected chart positions and certifications, showing other relevant details
Title	Year	Peak chart positions							Sales	Certifications	Album
Title	Year	US	US Cou.	US Cou. Air.	US AC	CAN	CAN Cou.	SCO	Sales	Certifications	Album
"Down This Road"	2013	—	—	—	—	—	—	—			—
"My Mistake"	2015	—	—	52	—	—	—	—			Untamed
"Burning House"	2015	29	2	2	21	46	2	—	US: 1,231,000	MC: Platinum; RIAA: 3× Platinum	Untamed
"Mayday"	2016	—	32	36	—	—	34	—			Untamed
"Diane"	2017	—	43	43	—	—	49	30			The Otherside
"Classic"	2020	—	—	—	—	—	—	—			The Otherside
"Till There's Nothing Left"	2021	—	—	47	—	—	—	—			The Otherside
"—" denotes a recording that did not chart or was not released in that territory.

=== As featured artist ===
List of singles, with selected chart positions and other relevant details
Title	Year	Peak chart positions			Album
Title	Year	US Adult	US Dance	NZ	Album
"Call Me Sir" (Train featuring Cam and Travie McCoy)	2018	23	—	—	Greatest Hits
"So Long" (Diplo featuring Cam)	2019	—	34	26	Diplo Presents Thomas Wesley, Chapter 1: Snake Oil
"—" denotes a recording that did not chart or was not released in that territory.

=== Promotional singles ===
Title	Year	Album
"Road to Happiness"	2018	—
"Palace"	2018	—
"La marcheuse"	2019	—
"Redwood Tree"	2020	The Otherside

== Music videos ==
List of music videos, showing year released and director
Title	Year	Director	Ref.
"Burning House"	2015	Trey Fanjoy	
"Mayday"	2016	Daniel Carberry	
"Diane"	2018	Daniel Carberry	
"Till There's Nothing Left"	2020	Dano Cerney	
"Classic"	2020	Taylor Fauntleroy	

== Other appearances ==
List of non-single guest appearances, with other performing artists, showing year released and album name
Title	Year	Other artist(s)	Album	Ref.
"I'll Be Waiting for You"	2016	Vince Gill	Down to My Last Bad Habit	
"Heartbreak Radio"	2019	Roy Orbison, Royal Philharmonic Orchestra	A Love So Beautiful/Unchained Melodies	
"Hurt People"	2020	Brandon Stansell	Hurt People EP	
