= MMXX (disambiguation) =

MMXX, or 2020, was a year.

MMXX may also refer to:

- MMXX (Sons of Apollo album), 2020
- MMXX (Diplo album), 2020
- MMXX, a 2020 EP by Electric Callboy
