= So Long =

So Long may refer to:

- "So Long" (ABBA song), 1974
- "So Long!" (AKB48 song), 2013
- "So Long" (Diplo song), 2019
- "So Long" (Russ Morgan song), 1940; covered by the Charioteers (1940), Ruth Brown (1949), and many others
- "So Long", a song by Apink from Pink Blossom, 2014
- "So Long", a song by the Cat Empire from So Many Nights, 2007
- "So Long", a song by the Donots from Wake the Dogs, 2012
- "So Long", a song by Everlast from the End of Days film soundtrack, 1999
- "So Long", a song by Fats Domino, 1956
- "So Long", a song by Fierce, 1999
- "So Long", a song by Firefall from Luna Sea, 1977
- "So Long", a song by Fischer-Z from Going Deaf for a Living, 1980
- "So Long", a song by Guster from Lost and Gone Forever, 1999
- "So Long", a song by James Marriott from Are We There Yet?, 2023
- "So Long", a song by the Kinks from Kinda Kinks, 1965
- "So Long", a song by Krokus from Hellraiser, 2006
- "So Long", a song by Massari, 2017
- "So Long", a song by Paul Kim from the Hotel del Luna OST, 2019
- "So Long", a song by Rilo Kiley from The Execution of All Things, 2002
- "So Long", a song by Seba & Lo-Tek, 1996
- “So Long”, a song by Slander, 2018
