= Welcome to Cam Country =

EP by Cam
- Released: March 31, 2015
- Genre: Country
- Length: 13:23
- Label: Arista Nashville; RCA
- Producer: Jeff Bhasker; Tyler Johnson

Cam chronology
| Heartforward (2010) | Welcome to Cam Country (2015) | Untamed (2015) |

Singles from Welcome to Cam Country
- 1. "My Mistake" Released: March 23, 2015; 2. "Burning House" Released: June 16, 2015

Welcome to Cam Country is the debut extended play (EP) recorded by American country music singer Cam, released through Arista Nashville and RCA Records on March 31, 2015. It features four songs co-written by Cam from her debut major-label album, including the top five single, "Burning House".

The EP was released to positive reviews for the strength of Cam's songwriting, but only moderate commercial success. It debuted at number 176 on the Billboard 200 and peaked at number 88.

== Reception ==
=== Critical ===
David Jeffries of AllMusic rated the album three-and-a-half stars out of five. "Singer/songwriter Cam... breaks out on her own with this four-song EP," writes Jeffries, adding that the "clever hit 'My Mistake'... is surrounded by equally infectious numbers." Spin graded the album as a 7 (out of 10), with reviewer Anthony Easton praising the emotional range and Cam's "first-rate" songwriting.

=== Commercial ===
Welcome to Cam Country debuted at number 176 on the Billboard 200 and at number 31 on the Billboard Top Country Albums chart. It also debuted at number 9 on the Heatseekers Albums chart for the week of June 27, 2015, and rose to a new peak position of 5 following the success of "Burning House" on the chart dated September 19, 2015. As of November 2015, the EP has sold 26,000 copies in the US.

== Singles ==
"My Mistake" was serviced to American country radio on March 23, 2015, as the EP's lead single. The song was initially shipped to radio on February 3. It received generally positive reviews and was cited as a highlight. "My Mistake" stalled at number 52 on the Billboard Country Airplay chart.

Arista Nashville opted to quickly release "Burning House" as the second single after the song garnered significant attention from fans following Cam's performance of the ballad on The Bobby Bones Show. It was serviced to country radio on June 16, 2015, and officially impacted on July 6, 2015. "Burning House" has since achieved commercial success, reaching the top 5 on both the Country Airplay and Hot Country Songs charts (reaching No. 2 on the latter) and also peaking at number 29 on the all-genre Billboard Hot 100. It has sold 667,000 copies in the US as of September 2015.

== Track listing ==
| No. | Title | Writer(s) | Length |
|---|---|---|---|
| 1. | "My Mistake" | Camaron Ochs; Tyler Johnson | 3:22 |
| 2. | "Burning House" | Ochs; Jeff Bhasker; Johnson | 3:54 |
| 3. | "Half Broke Heart" | Ochs; Luke Laird; Johnson | 3:06 |
| 4. | "Runaway Train" | Ochs; Anders Mouridsen; Bhasker | 3:01 |
| Total length: | | | 13:23 |

== Charts ==
=== Album ===
| Chart (2015) | Peak position |
|---|---|
| US Billboard 200 | 88 |
| US Heatseekers Albums (Billboard) | 5 |
| US Top Country Albums (Billboard) | 31 |

== Release history ==
| Country | Date | Format | Catalog No. | Ref. |
|---|---|---|---|---|
| Worldwide | March 3, 2015 | Streaming | — | |
| Worldwide | March 31, 2015 | Digital download | B00UJ4BW3G | |
