= Diane (Cam song) =

Single by Cam

from the album The Otherside
- Released: October 27, 2017
- Recorded: 2017
- Genre: Country pop
- Length: 3:32
- Label: Arista Nashville
- Songwriters: Camaron Ochs; Tyler Johnson; Jeff Bhasker
- Producers: Johnson; Bhasker

Cam singles chronology
"Mayday" (2016)	"Diane" (2017)	"Classic" (2020)

"Diane" is a song co-written and recorded by American country artist Cam, and is the lead single from her third album, The Otherside. The song was written with Tyler Johnson and Jeff Bhasker, who also produced the track. "Diane" is a country pop song that inverts the perspective on Dolly Parton's country classic "Jolene". A cover of the song appears on No Fear, the 2024 album by American bluegrass group Sister Sadie.

== Background and composition ==
"Diane" is a hard-charging, empowering country pop track in which Cam sings about an affair to an unsuspecting wife once she realizes the man she was seeing is married.

Cam noted to Rolling Stone Country that the song is her "response to Dolly Parton's 'Jolene.' It's the apology so many spouses deserve, but never get. The other woman is coming forward to break the news to the wife about an affair, respecting her enough to have that hard conversation, once she realized he was married. Because everyone should be able to decide their own path in life, based on the truth. Women especially should do this for each other, since our self-worth can still be so wrapped up in our partners. And in true country fashion, I've set the whole raw story to upbeat music, so you can dance while you process it all."

In April 2018, "Diane" was added to the BBC Radio 2 A-list.

== Live performances ==
Cam promoted "Diane" with several live performances including on Good Morning America, The Late Late Show with James Corden, and as a duet with a contestant on the sixteenth season of American Idol. On her Good Morning America appearance, she was surprised with a pre-recorded message from Dolly Parton praising her performance.

== Music video ==
The music video for "Diane," which was shot in Los Angeles, California and directed by Daniel Carberry, premiered on February 9, 2018. In it, Cam is shown playing the role of 'the other woman' and alerting the wife of the man who she unknowingly cheated with. Scenes of her performing on stage in a nightclub are interspersed between the storyline.

== Charts ==
Chart (2017–18)	Peak position
Canada Country (Billboard)	49
Scotland Singles (OCC)	30
UK Singles Downloads (OCC)	55
US Country Airplay (Billboard)	43
US Hot Country Songs (Billboard)	43
