= Tyler Johnson (musician) =

American record producer & songwriter

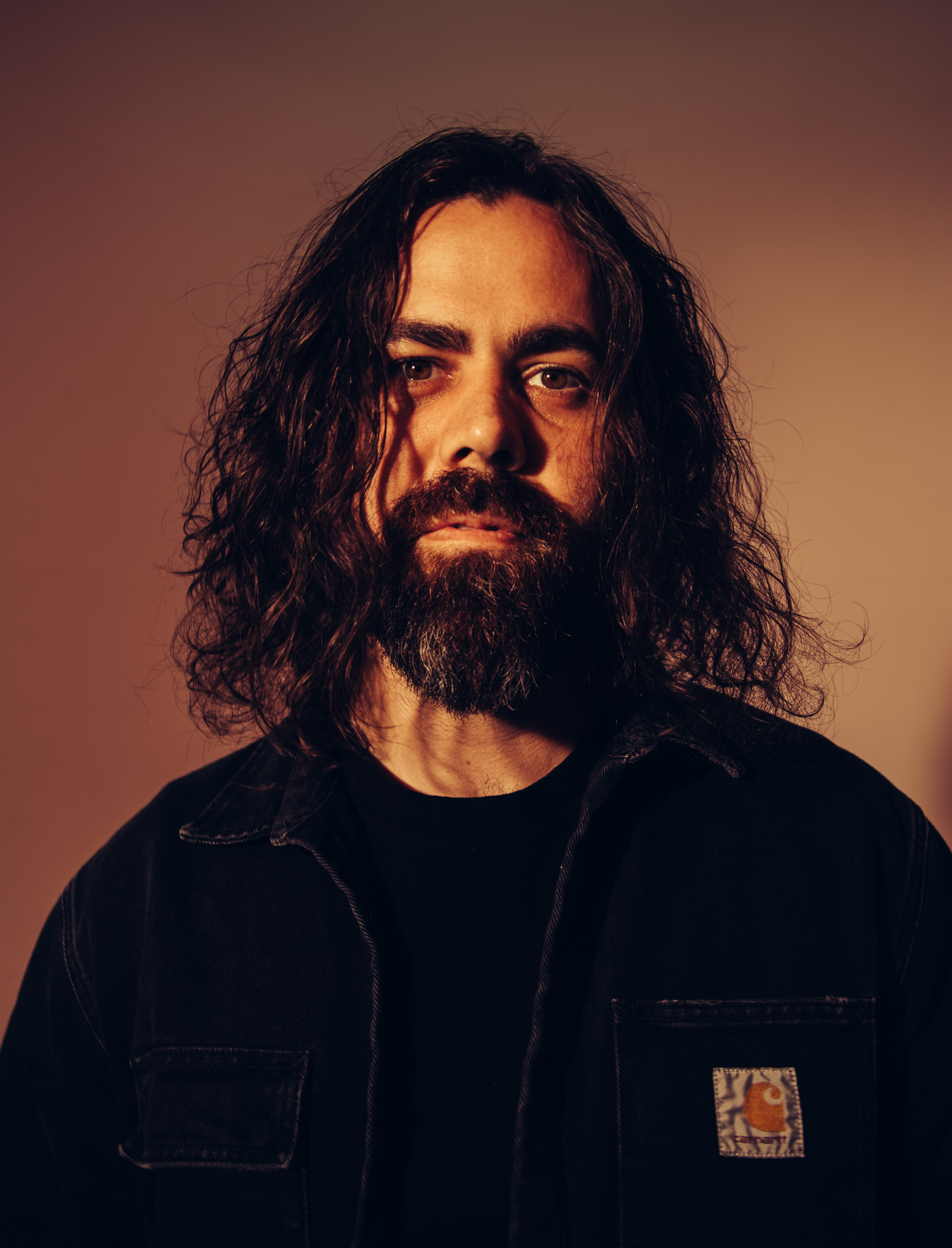
- Johnson in 2020

Background information
- Origin: Steamboat Springs, Colorado, U.S.
- Genre: Pop
- Occupations: Singer; songwriter; record producer; engineer
- Instruments: Guitar; bass; piano; keyboards; drums
- Years active: 2012–present

Tyler Johnson is an American record producer and songwriter based in Los Angeles. He is a 9-time Grammy Award nominee, and 3-time Grammy Award winner.

== Early life ==
Johnson was born and raised in Steamboat Springs, Colorado. After relocating to Los Angeles, he started out his career as an assistant to producer Jeff Bhasker.

== Career ==
Johnson was nominated for a Grammy Award for his work as an engineer on Taylor Swift's 2012 album Red, and was nominated for a second Grammy for his work as a producer and engineer on Ed Sheeran's 2014 album x.

Johnson co-produced the 2015 album Untamed by country artist Cam, co-writing eight tracks, including the singles "Mayday", "My Mistake", and "Burning House", which reached #2 on the Billboard Country Airplay and Hot Country Songs charts and became Johnson's first platinum-selling record. He also produced 10 songs on Cam's 2020 album The Otherside, co-writing 6 of them.

On January 19, 2018, Johnson released his debut single as a solo artist, "Give Up On Me".

Johnson co-wrote and produced Harry Styles' 2017 debut self-titled solo album, the 2019 follow-up Fine Line, including "Watermelon Sugar", which went to number one on the Billboard Hot 100, Styles' third studio album, Harry's House, which won a Grammy Award for Album of the Year at the 65th Annual Grammy Awards, and its lead single, "As It Was", which spent 15 non-consecutive weeks at number one on the Billboard Hot 100 and was the best-selling global single of 2022. Johnson wrote 8 tracks and produced 7 tracks on Styles' 2026 album Kiss All the Time. Disco, Occasionally.

Johnson won a Grammy Award for Record of the Year for producing Miley Cyrus's 2023 single "Flowers", which spent 8 weeks at number 1 on the Billboard Hot 100. He was also nominated for Album of the Year for his work writing and producing six tracks on Cyrus's album Endless Summer Vacation.

In 2024, Johnson co-wrote and co-produced two songs ("Amen" and "Ameriican Requiem") on Beyoncé's Grammy-nominated album Cowboy Carter. He also wrote and produced on Halsey's album The Great Impersonator and Childish Gambino's Bando Stone & the New World. Johnson was nominated for the 2026 Grammy Award for Best Engineered Album, Non-Classical for producing Cam's album All Things Light.

As a writer, producer, and engineer, Johnson has also worked with artists including Keith Urban, John Legend, Diplo, Pink, OneRepublic, Sam Smith, Meghan Trainor, Toni Braxton, 070 Shake, and Leon Bridges.

== Discography ==
=== Singles ===
- "Give Up On Me" (2018)
- "You and I" (2018)

=== Songwriting and production ===
Year	Artist	Album	Song	Credit
2012	P!nk	The Truth About Love	"Just Give Me a Reason" feat. Nate Ruess	Engineer
2012	Taylor Swift	Red	"Holy Ground"	Engineer
2012	Taylor Swift	Red	"The Lucky One"	Engineer
2012	All American Rejects	Flatline EP	"Walk Over Me (Jeff Bhasker Vs. Tyler Johnson Remix)"	Producer
2012	fun.	Some Nights	"Some Nights (Intro)"	Sampling
2013	Miley Cyrus	Bangerz	"Maybe You're Right"	Writer
2013	Miley Cyrus	Bangerz	"My Darlin'" feat. Future	Producer
2013	OneRepublic	Native	"Can't Stop"	Producer, writer
2015	Ed Sheeran	x	"Photograph"	Additional production, engineer
2015	Cam	Untamed	"Burning House"	Producer, writer
2015	Cam	Untamed	"My Mistake"	Producer, writer
2015	Cam	Untamed	"Half Broke Heart"	Producer, writer
2015	Cam	Untamed	"Untamed"	Producer, writer
2015	Cam	Untamed	"Cold In California"	Producer, writer
2015	Cam	Untamed	"Want It All"	Producer, writer
2015	Cam	Untamed	"Hungover On Heartache"	Producer, writer
2015	Cam	Untamed	"Mayday"	Producer, writer
2015	Mikky Ekko	Time	"Burning Doves"	Producer
2015	Elle King	Love Stuff	"Ain't Gonna Drown"	Additional production
2015	Elle King	Love Stuff	"Kocaine Karolina"	Engineer
2015	SonReal	For The Town EP	"Home"	Producer, writer
2016	Keith Urban	Ripcord	"Gone Tomorrow (Here Today)"	Producer, writer
2016	John Legend	Darkness and Light	"Love You Anyway"	Writer
2017	Harry Styles	Harry Styles	"Sign of the Times"	Producer, writer
2017	Harry Styles	Harry Styles	"Meet Me in the Hallway"	Producer, writer
2017	Harry Styles	Harry Styles	"Carolina"	Producer, writer
2017	Harry Styles	Harry Styles	"Two Ghosts"	Producer, writer
2017	Harry Styles	Harry Styles	"Only Angel"	Producer, writer
2017	Harry Styles	Harry Styles	"Kiwi"	Producer, writer
2017	Harry Styles	Harry Styles	"Ever Since New York"	Producer, writer
2017	Harry Styles	Harry Styles	"Woman"	Producer, writer
2017	Harry Styles	Harry Styles	"From the Dining Table"	Producer, writer
2017	Harry Styles	Harry Styles	"Sweet Creature"	Co-producer
2017	Sam Smith	The Thrill of It All	"One Last Song"	Producer, writer
2017	Sam Smith	The Thrill of It All	"Palace"	Producer, writer
2017	Cam	The Otherside	"Diane"	Writer, producer
2018	Harry Styles		"Medicine"	Writer
2019	Maren Morris	Girl	"Shade"	Writer
2019	The Head and the Heart	Living Mirage		Producer
2019	Diplo		"So Long" featuring Cam	Writer
2019	Harry Styles	Fine Line	"Golden"	Producer, writer
2019	Harry Styles	Fine Line	"Watermelon Sugar"	Producer, writer
2019	Harry Styles	Fine Line	"Adore You"	Producer, writer
2019	Harry Styles	Fine Line	"Lights Up"	Producer, writer
2019	Harry Styles	Fine Line	"Cherry"	Producer, writer
2019	Harry Styles	Fine Line	"To Be So Lonely"	Producer, writer
2019	Harry Styles	Fine Line	"Fine Line"	Producer, writer
2019	Harry Styles	Fine Line	"Falling"	Producer
2019	Harry Styles	Fine Line	"She"	Producer
2019	Harry Styles	Fine Line	"Canyon Moon"	Producer
2019	Meghan Trainor	The Love Train	"I'm Down"	Writer
2019	Meghan Trainor	The Love Train	"After You"	Writer, producer
2020	Brett Eldredge	Sunday Drive	"Where the Heart Is"	Writer
2020	Meghan Trainor	Treat Myself	"Evil Twin"	Writer, producer
2020	Meghan Trainor	Treat Myself	"Another Opinion"	Writer, producer
2020	Toni Braxton	Spell My Name	"Saturday Night"	Writer
2020	Cam	The Otherside	"Redwood Tree"	Writer, producer
2020	Cam	The Otherside	"The Otherside"	Writer, producer
2020	Cam	The Otherside	"Forgetting You"	Writer, producer
2020	Cam	The Otherside	"Changes"	Writer, producer
2020	Cam	The Otherside	"Till There's Nothing Left"	Writer, producer
2020	Cam	The Otherside	"Like a Movie"	Producer
2020	Cam	The Otherside	"What Goodbye Means"	Producer
2020	Cam	The Otherside	"Happier For You"	Producer
2020	Cam	The Otherside	"Girl Like Me"	Producer
2020	LANY	Mama's Boy	"Cowboy in LA"	Producer
2020	LANY	Mama's Boy	"Heart Won't Let Me"	Producer
2020	LANY	Mama's Boy	"If This Is the Last Time"	Producer
2020	LANY	Mama's Boy	"Good Guys"	Producer
2020	LANY	Mama's Boy	"Nobody Else"	Producer
2020	Lennon Stella	Three. Two. One.	"Goodnight"	Producer
2020	Amy Allen		"What a Time to Be Alive" feat. Pink Sweat$	Writer, producer
2022	Harry Styles	Harry's House	"As It Was"	Writer, producer
2022	Harry Styles	Harry's House	"Music for a Sushi Restaurant"	Writer, producer
2022	Harry Styles	Harry's House	"Grapejuice"	Writer, producer
2022	Harry Styles	Harry's House	"Daylight"	Writer, producer
2022	Harry Styles	Harry's House	"Matilda"	Writer, producer
2022	Harry Styles	Harry's House	"Daydreaming"	Writer, producer
2022	Harry Styles	Harry's House	"Keep Driving"	Writer, producer
2022	Harry Styles	Harry's House	"Satellite"	Writer, producer
2022	Harry Styles	Harry's House	"Boyfriends"	Writer, producer
2022	Harry Styles	Harry's House	"Love of My Life"	Writer, producer
2022	Meghan Trainor	Takin' It Back	"While You're Young"	Writer
2022	Meghan Trainor	Takin' It Back	"Final Breath"	Writer
2022	Dean Lewis	The Hardest Love	"The Hardest Love"	Producer
2022	Dean Lewis	The Hardest Love	"Something to Help"	Writer, producer
2023	Miley Cyrus	Endless Summer Vacation	"Flowers"	Writer, producer, guitar, keyboards, synthesizer
2023	Miley Cyrus	Endless Summer Vacation	"Rose Coloured Lenses"	Writer, producer, synthesizer
2023	Miley Cyrus	Endless Summer Vacation	"Thousand Miles (Featuring Brandi Carlile)"	Writer, producer, keyboards, synthesizer, drums
2023	Miley Cyrus	Endless Summer Vacation	"River"	Writer, producer, synthesizer, bass, drum machine, vocals
2023	Miley Cyrus	Endless Summer Vacation	"Wildcard"	Writer, producer, synthesizer
2023	Miley Cyrus	Endless Summer Vacation	"Wonder Woman"	Writer, producer
2023	Portugal. The Man	Chris Black Changed My Life	"Thunderdome [W.T.A.]" (feat. Black Thought and Natalia Lafourcade)	Writer, producer
2023	Kevin Abstract	Blanket	"Madonna"	Writer, producer, keyboards, vocals
2024	Halsey	The Great Impersonator	"Hurt Feelings"	Writer, Producer
2024	Halsey	The Great Impersonator	"I Never Loved You"	Writer, Producer
2024	Beyoncé	Cowboy Carter	"Ameriican Requiem"	Writer, producer
2024	Beyoncé	Cowboy Carter	"Amen"	Writer, producer, organ
2024	Childish Gambino	Bando Stone & the New World	"Got to Be"	Writer, producer
2024	Childish Gambino	Bando Stone & the New World	"Cruisin'" (feat. Yeat)	Writer
2024	Childish Gambino	Bando Stone & the New World	"Running Around" (feat. Fousheé)	Writer, producer, guitar
2024	Leon Bridges	Leon	"Simplify"	Writer
2024	Leon Bridges	Leon	"Ivy"	Writer, producer
2024	Meghan Trainor	Timeless	"Criminals"	Writer
2024	BLK ODYSSY	1-800-FANTASY	"Want You"	Producer
2024	070 Shake	Petrichor	"Winter Baby / New Jersey Blues"	Writer, producer
2024	070 Shake	Petrichor	"Pieces of You"	Writer, producer
2024	SZA	Lana	"Scorsese Baby Daddy"	Writer, producer
2024	Gabriel Black	Goodbye Gabriel Black	"Enemy"	Writer
2025	Miley Cyrus	Something Beautiful	"Secrets"	Writer
2025	Miley Cyrus	Something Beautiful	"Give Me Love"	Writer, producer
2025	Cam	All Things Light	"Turns Out That I Am God"	Writer, producer
2025	Cam	All Things Light	"Alchemy"	Writer, producer
2025	Cam	All Things Light	"Everblue"	Writer, producer
2025	Cam	All Things Light	"Wherever You Are"	Writer, producer
2025	Cam	All Things Light	"Just for You"	Writer, producer
2025	Cam	All Things Light	"Hallelujah"	Writer, producer
2025	Cam	All Things Light	"Look at the Pretty Girls!"	Writer, producer
2025	Cam	All Things Light	"We Always Do"	Writer, producer
2025	Girlsweetvoiced	Non-album single	"Spearmint"	Writer, producer
2026	Harry Styles	Kiss All the Time. Disco, Occasionally.	"American Girls"	Writer, producer
2026	Harry Styles	Kiss All the Time. Disco, Occasionally.	"Ready, Steady, Go!"	Writer, producer
2026	Harry Styles	Kiss All the Time. Disco, Occasionally.	"Are You Listening Yet?"	Writer, producer
2026	Harry Styles	Kiss All the Time. Disco, Occasionally.	"Taste Back"	Writer, producer
2026	Harry Styles	Kiss All the Time. Disco, Occasionally.	"The Waiting Game"	Writer, producer
2026	Harry Styles	Kiss All the Time. Disco, Occasionally.	"Season 2 Weight Loss"	Writer
2026	Harry Styles	Kiss All the Time. Disco, Occasionally.	"Pop"	Writer, producer
2026	Harry Styles	Kiss All the Time. Disco, Occasionally.	"Paint by Numbers"	Writer, producer
2026	BTS	Arirang	"Into the Sun"	Writer, producer

– Source:

== Awards and nominations ==
Year	Organization	Award	Project	Result
2014	56th Grammy Awards	Album of the Year	Taylor Swift, Red	Nominated
2015	57th Grammy Awards	Album of the Year	Ed Sheeran, x	Nominated
2016	CMA Awards	Song of the Year	Cam, "Burning House"	Nominated
2016	CMA Awards	Album of the Year	Keith Urban, Ripcord	Nominated
2016	ACM Awards	Song of the Year	Cam, "Burning House"	Nominated
2016	ACM Awards	Single Record of the Year	Cam, "Burning House"	Nominated
2016	NSAI Awards	Songs I Wish I'd Written	Cam, "Burning House"	Won
2017	ACM Awards	Album of the Year	Keith Urban, Ripcord	Nominated
2023	65th Grammy Awards	Record of the Year	Harry Styles, "As It Was"	Nominated
2023	65th Grammy Awards	Song of the Year	Harry Styles, "As It Was"	Nominated
2023	65th Grammy Awards	Best Pop Vocal Album	Harry Styles, Harry's House	Won
2023	65th Grammy Awards	Album of the Year	Harry Styles, Harry's House	Won
2024	66th Grammy Awards	Album of the Year	Miley Cyrus, Endless Summer Vacation	Nominated
2024	66th Grammy Awards	Record of the Year	Miley Cyrus, "Flowers"	Won
2026	68th Grammy Awards	Best Engineered Album, Non-Classical	Cam, All Things Light	Nominated
