= Heartless (Diplo song) =

2019 song by Thomas Wesley

Single by Thomas Wesley featuring Morgan Wallen

from the album Chapter 1: Snake Oil and Dangerous: The Double Album
- Released: August 16, 2019
- Genre: Country-pop; trap
- Length: 2:49
- Label: Mad Decent; Columbia
- Songwriters: Thomas Wesley Pentz; Henry Agincourt Allen; Ryan Vojtesak; Morgan Wallen; Ernest Keith Smith; Ryan Hurd
- Producers: Diplo; King Henry; Charlie Handsome; Joey Moi

Diplo singles chronology
"JustYourSoul" (2019)	"Heartless" (2019)	"Lonely" (2019)

Morgan Wallen singles chronology
"Chasin' You" (2019)	"Heartless" (2019)	"More Than My Hometown" (2020)

Music video
- "Heartless" on YouTube

"Heartless" is a song by American producer Diplo, released under his country-inspired alias Thomas Wesley, and features vocals from American country singer Morgan Wallen. It was released through Mad Decent and Columbia Records on August 16, 2019. The music video was directed by Brandon Dermer and premiered on September 5, 2019.

== Background ==
"Heartless" is a part of Diplo's first "country project" and album Chapter 1: Snake Oil where he collaborated with many different artists, creating songs with a mashup of trap, pop, country, and dance/electronic music. The album was released on May 29, 2020. Writing credits were given to Diplo, Wallen, King Henry, Ryan Vojtesak, Ernest Keith Smith, and Ryan Hurd.

Andrew McInnes, Diplo's manager, reached out to Seth England, who is Wallen's manager, along with Florida Georgia Line and Chris Lane. Diplo and Wallen did not even meet until the making of the music video.

== Commercial performance ==
"Heartless" was certified gold by the RIAA on November 19, 2019, platinum on February 12, 2020, and double platinum on June 16, 2020, for 2 million units in sales and streams. The song has sold 73,000 copies in the United States as of March 2020. On December 16, 2025, it was certified Diamond by RIAA.

== Music video ==
The music video for "Heartless" was released onto YouTube on September 5, 2019. In the video, Wallen and Diplo are seen exploring Atlantic City. In the beginning, the camera shifts from the men playing games at a carnival to them singing on the beach and boardwalk. Later the pair is seen getting in a car where they are taken to a casino, when finally, they are performing a concert on stage for a crowd until the ending where the two share a hug.

== Charts ==
=== Weekly charts ===
Chart (2019–2020)	Peak position
Australia (ARIA)	99
Canada Hot 100 (Billboard)	62
New Zealand Hot Singles (RMNZ)	25
US Billboard Hot 100	39
US Hot Country Songs (Billboard)	10
US Rolling Stone Top 100	31

=== Year-end charts ===
Chart (2019)	Position
US Hot Country Songs (Billboard)	75

Chart (2020)	Position
US Hot Country Songs (Billboard)	55

Chart (2024)	Position
Australia Dance (ARIA)	18

== Certifications ==
Region	Certification	Certified units/sales
Australia (ARIA)	4× Platinum	280,000^{‡}
Canada (Music Canada)	7× Platinum	560,000^{‡}
New Zealand (RMNZ)	2× Platinum	60,000^{‡}
United Kingdom (BPI)	Silver	200,000^{‡}
United States (RIAA)	Diamond	10,000,000^{‡}
^{‡} Sales+streaming figures based on certification alone.

== Julia Michaels version ==
"Heartless"

Single by Thomas Wesley and Julia Michaels featuring Morgan Wallen

from the album Diplo Presents Thomas Wesley, Chapter 1: Snake Oil
- Released: January 31, 2020
- Genre: Pop
- Length: 2:53

Julia Michaels singles chronology
"Cool Anymore" (2019)	"Heartless" (2020)	"Give It to You" (2020)

Music video
- "Heartless" on YouTube

A re-recorded version of the song featuring American singer Julia Michaels was released on January 31, 2020. A second video clip was released on the same day. The video was filmed in Nashville and again, directed by Brandon Dermer. The clip takes place at a motel where Wallen and Michaels appear to be having issues in their respective relationships. When both of them step outside for fresh air, they ditch their lovers and run away together. The remix impacted pop radio in the US on February 25, 2020.

=== Music video ===
The alternate music video with Julia Michaels was released to YouTube on January 31, 2020. In the video, both Wallen and Michaels are seen at the same motel, both with a significant other. First, Michaels is seen having trouble connecting with her man, as he shrugs her off when she attempts to put her head on his shoulder. It then shifts to Wallen who is also seen having the same trouble with his girl, as she shrugs him away when he attempts to put his arm around her. After a few shots of them singing in their rooms, they both then walk out of the door and lean on the walls next to each other, where they share a smile and a nod. They both go back in to pack their bags. Finally they both meet outside to get in Wallen's truck and drive off where the video comes to an end.

=== Charts ===
Chart (2020)	Peak position
Canada CHR/Top 40 (Billboard)	35
New Zealand Hot Singles (RMNZ)	19
US Adult Pop Airplay (Billboard)	37
US Pop Airplay (Billboard)	22

== Wallen Album Mix ==
"Heartless (Wallen Album Mix)"

Promotional single by Morgan Wallen

from the album Dangerous: The Double Album
- Released: August 28, 2020
- Genre: Country
- Length: 2:49
- Label: Mad Decent / Columbia (Digital download); Big Loud / Republic (album version)
- Producer: Joey Moi

Music video
- "Heartless (Wallen Album Mix)" on YouTube

Wallen released a solo re-recorded version of the song in August 2020. A studio video was released several days later. This version of the song was solely produced by Joey Moi and instrumentally changed to sound like country music. It was included on Wallen's sophomore album Dangerous: The Double Album.

=== Critical reception ===
Wes Langeler of Whiskey Riff called the album mix "way better than the original", crediting the production choices and highlighting the use of real drums, banjos, slide guitar, and the mandolin.
