= My Mistake (Cam song) =

Single by Cam

from the album Untamed
- Released: March 23, 2015
- Genre: Country
- Length: 3:22
- Label: Arista Nashville
- Songwriter(s): Camaron Ochs; Tyler Johnson
- Producer(s): Jeff Bhasker; Tyler Johnson

Cam singles chronology
| "Down This Road" (2013) | "My Mistake" (2015) | "Burning House" (2015) |

"My Mistake" is a single by American country music singer Cam. It is the first single from her 2015 second album Untamed.

== Content ==
The song is about a one-night stand told from the female's perspective. She refers to the male in the song as "my mistake to make all night".

Before Cam released her debut album, "My Mistake," three other songs were included on an EP titled Welcome to Cam Country.

== Critical reception ==
In his review of Welcome to Cam Country for Allmusic, David Jeffries wrote that "if getting the clever hit 'My Mistake'[...] was the impetus for the EP, so be it. The highlight and earworm is surrounded by equally infectious numbers". Billy Dukes from Taste of Country reviewed the song favorably, saying that "Lyrically she and Tyler Johnson haven’t written an overly complicated or colorful song. The verses are short, sweet and sonically flawless[...]'My Mistake' shows both Cam’s strong voice and personality."

== Personnel ==
From Untamed liner notes.

Musicians

- Tom Bukovac - electric guitar
- Jeff Bhasker - piano
- Glen Duncan - bouzouki
- Tyler Johnson - keyboards, programming, background vocals
- Steve Jordan - drums
- Tony Lucido - bass guitar
- Cam (as Camaron Ochs) - vocals
- Russ Pahl - pedal steel guitar

Technical

- Jeff Bhasker - production
- John Castelli - mixing
- Tyler Johnson - production, vocal engineering
- Lindsay Marias - vocal production
- Melissa Mattey - engineering
- Ryan Nasci - engineering for mix
- Dave O'Donnell - engineering

== Chart positions ==
| Chart (2015) | Peak position |
|---|---|
| US Country Airplay (Billboard) | 52 |
