= Chapter 1: Snake Oil =

Studio album by Thomas Wesley
- Released: May 29, 2020
- Genres: Country pop; trap; EDM
- Length: 31:36
- Labels: Mad Decent; Columbia

Diplo chronology
LSD (2019)	Chapter 1: Snake Oil (2020)	MMXX (2020)

Singles from Chapter 1: Snake Oil
- 1. "So Long" Released: April 24, 2019; 2. "Lonely" Released: September 27, 2019; 3. "Heartless" Released: January 31, 2020

Chapter 1: Snake Oil is the second studio album by American DJ and musician Diplo, released under his country music alias Thomas Wesley. The album was released through Mad Decent and Columbia Records on May 29, 2020. It features collaborations by Orville Peck, Cam, Morgan Wallen, the Jonas Brothers, Thomas Rhett, Young Thug, Blanco Brown, Noah Cyrus, Julia Michaels, Clever, Zac Brown, Danielle Bradbery, Ben Burgess, Lil Nas X, and Billy Ray Cyrus. The album also serves as Diplo's first solo studio album in 16 years.

== Background ==
Diplo (born Thomas Wesley Pentz) grew up in Florida listening to both country music and hip-hop in equal measure. He has described watching Rap City on BET and CMT back-to-back after school and being “as obsessed with Tim McGraw and Alan Jackson as I was with Wu-Tang [Clan] and Dr. Dre.” The project under his real name was conceived as a way to explore country music from an outsider’s perspective while retaining his electronic production style.

In a later interview, Diplo admitted he “didn’t really know what [he] was doing” with the project at the time, but felt country was a genre that “could really do without my help.” He had been writing songs that leaned toward country while working in dance and pop, and the Thomas Wesley alias became a vehicle to release them. The album’s title references the historical “snake oil” salesmen of the American West, reflecting a self-aware approach to genre experimentation.

The project’s public origins trace back to Diplo’s 2019 Stagecoach Festival appearance, where he performed a Late Night dance set and debuted his remix of Lil Nas X and Billy Ray Cyrus’s “Old Town Road.” That remix and the surrounding cultural moment around “yeehaw” aesthetics helped open the door for the full album.

== Release and promotion ==
Diplo announced the album and its full track listing on April 20, 2020, via social media, with the caption “my kind of country will unite us all.” The project was positioned as the first chapter in a series under the Thomas Wesley name.

The album was released on May 29, 2020. To celebrate the release, Diplo hosted a special livestream edition of his variety show “The Thomas Wesley Show,” featuring guest appearances from collaborators including Cam, Julia Michaels, the Jonas Brothers, Orville Peck, Thomas Rhett, and Zac Brown. The event was sponsored by Tequila Don Julio and Wrangler, with Chipotle hosting an afterparty that distributed free burrito codes.

== Singles ==
The lead single, “So Long” (with Cam), was released on April 24, 2019. “Lonely” (with the Jonas Brothers) followed on September 27, 2019. “Heartless” (featuring Morgan Wallen) was released on January 31, 2020; an alternate version with Julia Michaels was also issued and later included on the album. Diplo’s remix of Lil Nas X and Billy Ray Cyrus’s “Old Town Road” also appears on the project and had been performed live at Stagecoach and the 2020 Grammy Awards.

== Critical reception ==
Professional ratings
Aggregate scores
Source	Rating
Metacritic	46/100
Review scores
Source	Rating
AllMusic	2.5/5 stars
Clash	3/10
DIY	2/5 stars
Entertainment Weekly	C−
The Line of Best Fit	3/10
musicOMH	2.5/5 stars
NME	2/5 stars
The Observer	3/5 stars
Pitchfork	4.8/10
Rolling Stone	2.5/5 stars

Chapter 1: Snake Oil was met with generally mixed to unfavorable reviews from critics. At Metacritic, which assigns a weighted average rating out of 100 to reviews from mainstream publications, the release received an average score of 46, based on 9 reviews.

== Track listing ==
Chapter 1: Snake Oil track listing
No.	Title	Writer(s)	Producer(s)	Length
1.	"Intro" (featuring Orville Peck)	Thomas Pentz; Orville Peck	Diplo; Peck	1:37
2.	"So Long" (with Cam)	Pentz; Camaron Ochs; Sasha Sloan; Henry Agincourt Allen; Tyler Johnson; Diana Gordon; Benjamin Mathis; Michael Wilson Hardy	Diplo; King Henry	2:52
3.	"Heartless" (featuring Morgan Wallen)	Pentz; Morgan Wallen; H. Allen; Ryan Vojtesak; Ernest Keith Smith; Ryan Hurd	Diplo; King Henry; Joey Moi; Charlie Handsome	2:49
4.	"Lonely" (with Jonas Brothers)	Pentz; Joseph Jonas; Nicholas Jonas; Kevin Jonas II; Ryan Tedder; Philip Meckseper; H. Allen	Diplo; Tedder; Jr Blender; King Henry	2:19
5.	"Dance with Me" (with Thomas Rhett and Young Thug)	Pentz; Thomas Rhett; Jeffery Williams; Zachary Alexander Brown; Tedder; Meckseper; Zach Skelton; Julian Bunetta	Diplo; Jr Blender; Tedder; King Henry; Skelton; Maximilian Jaeger^{[a]}	2:50
6.	"Do Si Do" (with Blanco Brown)	Pentz; Bennie Amey II; Philip von Boch Scully; H. Allen	Diplo; King Henry; Maximilian Jaeger^{[a]}; Von Boch Scully^{[a]}	2:18
7.	"On Mine" (with Noah Cyrus)	Pentz; Karen Marie Ørsted; H. Allen; Julia Michaels; Jaeger	Diplo; King Henry; Peck; Jaeger; Tommy Brenneck^{[a]}	2:26
8.	"Real Life Stuff" (featuring Julia Michaels and Clever)	Pentz; Julia Michaels; Joshua Huie; Amy Allen; Matt Zara; Von Boch Scully; Jaeger	Diplo; Von Boch Scully; Jaeger	3:13
9.	"Hometown" (featuring Zac Brown and Danielle Bradbery)	Pentz; Sloan; H. Allen; Hardy; Mathis	Diplo; King Henry; Great Dane^{[a]}; Jaeger^{[a]}	3:36
10.	"Heartbreak" (with Ben Burgess)	Pentz; Ben Burgess; H. Allen; Jaeger; Ashley Gorley; Jacob Durrett	Diplo; King Henry; Jaeger	2:17
11.	"Heartless" (Remix; with Julia Michaels featuring Morgan Wallen)	Pentz; Michaels; Wallen; H. Allen; Vojtesak; Smith; Hurd	Diplo; King Henry; Joey Moi; Charlie Handsome	2:53
12.	"Old Town Road" (Diplo Remix; performed by Lil Nas X featuring Billy Ray Cyrus)	Pentz; Montero Hill; Billy Ray Cyrus; Kiowa Roukema; Michael Trent Reznor; Atticus Matthew Ross; Jocelyn Donald	Diplo; YoungKio; Reznor; Ross	3:23
Total length:				31:36

Deluxe edition (bonus tracks)
No.	Title	Length
2.	"Bottle's Bout Dead" (with Ernest)	2:30
3.	"Horizon" (with Leon Bridges)	2:28
Total length:		36:34

Notes

- ^{^[a]} indicates a miscellaneous producer.

== Personnel ==
Musicians

- Diplo – drums (2–4, 6–10), programming (2–4, 6–9), remixer (12)
- King Henry – bass (2, 6, 9, 10), drums (2–4, 6, 9, 10), guitar (2, 4, 6, 9, 10), programming (2–4, 6, 9)
- Thomas Lea – violin (2)
- Charlie Handsome – guitar (3)
- Diablo – programming (3)
- Jr Blender – drums and programming (4)
- Ryan Tedder – drums and programming (4)
- Maximilian Jaeger – drum machine (6, 9), drums (6–10), programming (6–9), guitar (7, 8), keyboards (8)
- Philip von Boch Scully – drums and programming (6)
- William John Wilde – harmonica (6)
- MØ – vocals (7)
- Orville Peck – bass, guitar, and piano (7)
- Tommy Brenneck – piano (7)
- Matt Zara – guitar (8)
- Great Dane – drums and programming (9)
- Jocelyn "Jozzy" Donald – background vocals (12)

Technical

- Eric Lagg – mastering (1, 5–12)
- Joe LaPorta – mastering (2, 3)
- Chris Gehringer – mastering (4)
- Maximilian Jaeger – mixing (1, 3, 6–10), recording (6–10)
- Sean Moffitt – mixing (2)
- Serban Ghenea – mixing (4, 5, 11)
- A Bainz – mixing (5)
- Zaq Reynolds – recording (1)
- Analog in the Digital – recording (7)
- King Henry – recording (10)
- Cinco – recording (12)
- Ernesto Olvera-LaPier – engineering (2)
- Joey Moi – engineering (3, 11)
- John Hanes – engineering (4, 5, 11)
- Rich Rich – engineering (4
- Joe Grasso – engineering (12)
- Lindsay Marias – vocal production (2)
- Ryan Tedder – vocal production (4)
- Hauf – vocal production (10)
- Benjamin Rice – vocal production (11)
- Andrew "VoxGod" Bolooki – vocal production (12)
- Jocelyn "Jozzy" Donald – vocal production (12)
- Jesse Brock – engineering assistance (2)

== Charts ==
=== Weekly charts ===
Chart performance for Diplo Presents Thomas Wesley, Chapter 1: Snake Oil
Chart (2020)	Peak position
Australian Albums (ARIA)	83
Canadian Albums (Billboard)	20
US Billboard 200	50
US Top Country Albums (Billboard)	6

=== Year-end charts ===
2020 year-end chart performance for Diplo Presents Thomas Wesley, Chapter 1: Snake Oil
Chart (2020)	Position
Australian Top Country Albums (ARIA)	16
US Top Country Albums (Billboard)	37

2021 year-end chart performance for Diplo Presents Thomas Wesley, Chapter 1: Snake Oil
Chart (2021)	Position
US Top Country Albums (Billboard)	60

2023 year-end chart performance for Diplo Presents Thomas Wesley, Chapter 1: Snake Oil
Chart (2023)	Position
US Top Country Albums (Billboard)	57

2024 year-end chart performance for Diplo Presents Thomas Wesley, Chapter 1: Snake Oil
Chart (2024)	Position
US Top Country Albums (Billboard)	64

2024 year-end chart performance for Diplo Presents Thomas Wesley, Chapter 2: Swamp Savant
Chart (2024)	Position
Australian Country Albums (ARIA)	96

== Certifications ==
Certifications for Diplo Presents Thomas Wesley, Chapter 1: Snake Oil
Region	Certification	Certified units/sales
Canada (Music Canada)	Platinum	80,000^{‡}
United States (RIAA)	Platinum	1,000,000^{‡}
^{‡} Sales+streaming figures based on certification alone.
