= Brandon Dermer =

American film director

Brandon Dermer is an American writer, director, and producer who has worked in television, film, and music videos.

== Career ==
Brandon Dermer

=== Film ===
Dermer’s feature debut I’m Totally Fine (2022) was conceived and filmed during the COVID-19 pandemic, with the production completed in just 10 days in late 2021. The film was written by Alisha Ketry and produced by Kyle Newacheck. It stars Jillian Bell, Natalie Morales, Harvey Guillén, Blake Anderson, and Karen Maruyama. Lead actress Jillian Bell praised Dermer’s supportive and unflappable directing style, calling him “one of the loveliest humans I’ve met… [who] really knows what he wants”. I'm Totally Fine was released theatrically and is available for streaming on Hulu.

=== Television ===
Dermer created the series What Would Diplo Do?, which aired on Viceland and was later acquired by Spike Jonze. Dermer directed and executive produced the first season of the show. Dermer directed three episodes of the TV series Flatbush Misdemeanors (2021).

John Goblikon

Brandon Dermer co-created the character John Goblikon, the popular mascot for the metal band Nekrogoblikon, alongside Dave Rispoli and Alex Alereza. John Goblikon first appeared in the viral music video "No One Survives," directed by Dermer and starring Rispoli as John. The character's popularity led to the creation of the web series Right Now with John Goblikon (2015–2023), in which John humorously interviewed personalities from music and entertainment. In 2024, The web series was adapted into video podcast format, expanding its audience and featuring notable guests such as Andrew Santino, Pete Holmes, and Ron Funches. The growing popularity of John Goblikon has also led to the publication of a book, John Goblikon's Guide to Living Your Best Life, currently in development as a sitcom. In September 2025, the Right Now with John Goblikon podcast joined the All Things Comedy network.

=== Music videos ===
Brandon Dermer has directed numerous music videos, several of which have garnered special recognition (Vimeo Staff Picks, film festival showcases, or press accolades). Notable music videos directed by Dermer include:

- Diplo (Heartless, Dance with Me, Do Si Do)
- Panic! At The Disco (Victorious*, Dancing's Not a Crime, Hey Look Ma, I Made It)
- Jonas Brothers (Lonely)
- Steve Aoki
- Blink 182
- White Reaper (Judy French)
- Noah Cyrus
- Wolfie's Just Fine (A New Beginning^)
- Thomas Rhett
- Julia Michaels
- Fartbarf (Homeless in Heathrow^)
- Young Thug
- Kill The Noise (I Do Coke^)
- Trippie Redd
- Wavves
- Major Lazer (Scare Me^)
- Nekrogoblikon
- Dillon Francis (Not Butter^)

* Nominated for Best Rock Video at the 2016 MTV Music Video Awards

^ Vimeo staff pick

== Selected filmography ==
Feature Films

- I'm Totally Fine (2022)

Television

- What Would Diplo Do? (2017) - VICE – Director, Executive Producer - VICE
- Flatbush Misdemeanors (2021) – SHOWTIME - Director (3 episodes)

Podcast

- Right Now with John Goblikon (2024) – Co-creator, Director
