= Lonely (Diplo and Jonas Brothers song) =

2019 single by Diplo and Jonas Brothers

Single by Thomas Wesley and Jonas Brothers

from the album Chapter 1: Snake Oil
- Released: September 27, 2019
- Genre: House; folktronica
- Length: 2:19
- Label: Mad Decent; Columbia
- Songwriter(s): Thomas Pentz; Joseph Jonas; Nicholas Jonas; Kevin Jonas II; Ryan Tedder; Philip Meckseper; Henry Allen
- Producer(s): Diplo; Tedder; Jr Blender; King Henry

Diplo singles chronology
"Heartless" (2019)	"Lonely" (2019)	"Nice to Meet Ya (Diplo Remix)" (2019)

Jonas Brothers singles chronology
"Only Human" (2019)	"Lonely" (2019)	"Like It's Christmas" (2019)

Music video
- "Lonely" on YouTube

"Lonely" is a song by American DJ and record producer Diplo and American group Jonas Brothers. It was released through Mad Decent and Columbia Records on September 27, 2019, as the second single from Diplo's second studio album, Diplo Presents Thomas Wesley, Chapter 1: Snake Oil (2020). Diplo produced the song alongside Ryan Tedder, Jr Blender, and King Henry, and they all wrote it with three members of the Jonas Brothers: Joe, Nick, and Kevin Jonas.

== Promotion ==
On September 25, 2019, Diplo used the Jonas Brothers' Instagram account to unfollow everyone but his own account and posted photos of himself on their feed, with E! News later revealing it was a publicity stunt for an upcoming collaboration.

== Music video ==
The video was released on September 27, 2019, and was directed by Brandon Dermer. The brothers are seen sharply dressed while singing in a studio, while Diplo at one point wears a red-white-and-blue western suit and rides a horse. The video begins with Diplo apologizing to Joe about "ruining" his wedding. Throughout the video, Diplo is seen touring the world while trying to get through to the Jonas Brothers, but they keep declining him. In the end, they finally decide to call the American producer himself, but when Diplo is about to accept the call, his phone battery runs out and he puts it down.

== Live performances ==
The Jonas Brothers performed the song live for the first time (without Diplo) during a set at the Grammy Museum in Los Angeles on October 7, 2019.

== Charts ==
Chart (2019–2020)	Peak position
Australia (ARIA)	40
Australia Dance (ARIA)	5
Belgium (Ultratip Bubbling Under Flanders)	19
Canada (Canadian Hot 100)	69
Canada CHR/Top 40 (Billboard)	23
Canada Hot AC (Billboard)	33
Ireland (IRMA)	54
Lithuania (AGATA)	41
Mexico Ingles Airplay (Billboard)	38
New Zealand Hot Singles (RMNZ)	6
Slovakia (Singles Digitál Top 100)	61
UK Singles (OCC)	89
US Bubbling Under Hot 100 (Billboard)	10
US Pop Airplay (Billboard)	27
US Rolling Stone Top 100	89

== Certifications ==
Region	Certification	Certified units/sales
Australia (ARIA)	Platinum	70,000^{‡}
Canada (Music Canada)	Platinum	80,000^{‡}
New Zealand (RMNZ)	Platinum	30,000^{‡}
United States (RIAA)	Gold	500,000^{‡}
^{‡} Sales+streaming figures based on certification alone.
