= The Otherside (album) =

Studio album by Cam
- Released: October 30, 2020
- Recorded: 2017–2020
- Genre: Country pop, EDM
- Length: 37:07
- Label: RCA; Triple Tigers
- Producer: Jack Antonoff; Jeff Bhasker; Cam; Avicii; Tyler Johnson; Doug Showalter

Cam chronology
Untamed (2015)	The Otherside (2020)	All Things Light (2025)

Singles from The Otherside
- 1. "Diane" Released: October 27, 2017; 2. "Classic" Released: July 17, 2020; 3. "Till There's Nothing Left" Released: April 5, 2021

The Otherside is the second major-label studio album and third overall album by American country artist Cam. It was released by RCA/Triple Tigers on October 30, 2020, five years after her previous album Untamed.

The album broadens Cam's musical stylings, with some tracks including electronic, R&B and soft rock elements paired with her trademark acoustic country pop. Songwriting collaborators on the record include Jack Antonoff and the late Avicii as well as Sam Smith and Harry Styles, who Cam toured with in 2017 and 2018 respectively.

== Background ==
Cam released a song titled "Road to Happiness" that failed to chart, resulting in her parting ways with her record label Arista Nashville in 2018. On June 29, 2020, Cam subsequently signed a record deal with Triple Tigers in partnership with RCA Records who moved forward with plans to release The Otherside, with Cam citing the desire to move to a label who took greater care of their artists. In a statement, Triple Tigers executive Norbert Nix explained that "When I heard Cam's new music, I was moved and inspired. She has an identifiable, world class voice and her songs are crafted with experience, emotion and strength. She is at the apex of her creative journey and it's an honor to work with an artist of her caliber and to partner with our good friends at RCA Records New York to showcase her talents to the world."

Of the large gap between Untamed and The Otherside, Cam told Rolling Stone Country that the album had "been evolving slowly, but there was never a dramatic shift or a change in content... I just had more time to tinker." Of the album's sonic range, she explained that "What Tyler and Jeff and I set out to do was make a vocal album [that is] about me using all the colors I have to tell those stories."

== Promotion ==
=== Singles ===
The first single from the album, "Diane" was released on October 27, 2017. Promotional single "Till There's Nothing Left" was released on February 13, 2020, followed by a second promotional track, "Redwood Tree", which was released on May 29, 2020.

The album's second (and first for Triple Tigers) official single "Classic" was released on July 17, 2020. "Till There's Nothing Left" was released on April 5, 2021 as the album's third official single.

== Track listing ==
The Otherside track listing
No.	Title	Writer(s)	Length
1.	"Redwood Tree"	Camaron Ochs; Tyler Johnson; Anders Mouridsen	3:18
2.	"The Otherside"	Ochs; Tim Bergling; Johnson; Hillary Lindsey	2:55
3.	"Classic"	Ochs; Jack Antonoff	2:55
4.	"Forgetting You"	Ochs; Johnson; Lori McKenna; Mitch Rowland	3:04
5.	"Like a Movie"	Ochs; Lindsey; McKenna; Liz Rose	4:03
6.	"Changes"	Thomas Hull; Johnson; McKenna; Harry Styles	3:23
7.	"Till There's Nothing Left"	Ochs; Jeff Bhasker; Johnson; Lindsey	3:15
8.	"What Goodbye Means"	Ochs; Bhasker; Tom Kimmel; Mouridsen	3:21
9.	"Diane"	Ochs; Bhasker; Johnson	3:32
10.	"Happier For You"	Ochs; Rowland; Sam Smith	3:51
11.	"Girl Like Me"	Ochs; Natalie Hemby	3:30
Total length:			37:07

== Personnel ==
Adapted from AllMusic.

- Jack Antonoff – acoustic bass, drums, 12-string guitar, acoustic guitar, electric guitar, percussion, piano, background vocals
- Chris Baldani – horns
- Tim Bergling – production, piano, programming ("The Otherside")
- Jeff Bhasker – keyboards, programming, background vocals
- David Campbell – conductor
- Jon Castelli – keyboards
- Glen Duncan – mandolin
- Peter Dyer – percussion, piano
- Ian Fitchuk – drums
- Mark Hill – bass guitar
- Tyler Johnson – bass guitar, drums, electric guitar, keyboards, organ, piano, programming, synthesizer, background vocals, Wurlitzer
- Hillary Lindsey – background vocals
- Nick Lobel – electric guitar, percussion, programming, background vocals
- Tony Lucido – bass guitar
- Lindsay Marias – background vocals
- Pat Marsh – background vocals
- Simon Mårtensson – acoustic guitar
- Rob McNelley – electric guitar
- Anders Mouridsen – dobro, acoustic guitar, electric guitar, piano
- Ryan Nasci – bass guitar, programming
- Camaron Ochs – acoustic guitar, lead vocals, background vocals
- Leroy Powell – pedal steel guitar
- Connor Rayne – drums, percussion
- Mitch Rowland – drums, acoustic guitar, electric guitar, mallets
- Justin Schipper – pedal steel guitar
- Doug Showalter – acoustic guitar, electric guitar, programming, background vocals
- Evan Smith – keyboards, saxophone
- Harry Styles – whistle
- Ulf Mickael Wahlgren – drums, percussion
- Adam Weaver – background vocals

== Charts ==
Chart performance for The Otherside
Chart (2020)	Peak position
Scottish Albums (OCC)	27
UK Country Albums (OCC)	1
UK Album Downloads (OCC)	15
US Billboard 200	195
