= Jassi – Back with a Bang =

Jassi - Back with a Bang

Studio album by Jasbir Jassi
- Released: 16 July 2010
- Genre: Punjabi, Bhangra
- Label: Times

Jasbir Jassi chronology
Ankh Mastani (2007)	Jassi - Back with a Bang (2010)	Nachlai (2011)

Professional ratings
Review scores
Source	Rating
Singh Speaks	3/5 stars

Jassi – Back with a Bang is the ninth studio album by Punjabi singer Jasbir Jassi, released on 16 July 2010 worldwide. Some songs on the Album ("Bang", "Kalaria", "Mela", "Baliye") were co-produced by multiple Grammy winning record producer Jeff Bhasker.

== Track listing ==
Track	Song	Singer(s)	Producer	Lyrics
1	Mehndi	Jasbir Jassi	Steven Farr	Jasbir Jassi
2	Bang - Jassi Feat CX	Jasbir Jassi	Jeff Bhasker	Traditional
3	Kalaria	Jasbir Jassi	Jeff Bhasker & Adam Deitch	Param Pal Sandhu
4	Khusro	Jasbir Jassi	Hamza & Jassi	Amir Khusro
5	Mela - Jassi Feat CX	Jasbir Jassi	Jeff Bhasker	Jasbir Jassi
6	Jattiyan - Jassi Feat CX	Jasbir Jassi	Steven Farr	Gurpreet ghuggi
7	Gali Gali	Jasbir Jassi	Hamza & Jassi	Madan gopal
8	Baliye	Jasbir Jassi	Jeff Bhasker	Jasbir Jassi
9	Pia	Jasbir Jassi	Steven Farr	Jasbir Jassi
