= Mayday (Cam song) =

Single by Cam

from the album Untamed
- Released: February 15, 2016
- Recorded: 2010–15
- Genre: Country pop
- Length: 3:36
- Label: Arista Nashville
- Songwriters: Camaron Ochs; Tyler Johnson
- Producers: Tyler Johnson; Jeff Bhasker; Zachary Werner

Cam singles chronology
"Burning House" (2015)	"Mayday" (2016)	"Diane" (2017)

"Mayday" is a song co-written and recorded by American country music artist Cam for her second studio album Untamed (2015). The song was written with Tyler Johnson, who also produced the track with Jeff Bhasker and Zachary Werner. "Mayday" is a country pop song about a sinking relationship, built around a hook evoking a mayday call. It was released to country radio via Play MPE as the album's third single on January 26, 2016 before officially impacting radio on February 15, 2016.

== Background and composition ==
"Mayday" is a mid-tempo country pop ballad about an unhealthy relationship in which the deteriorating situation is compared the sensation of drowning. The song is built around a hook, "Mayday, mayday, this is an emergency," which evokes a distress call. Each verse is sung in a syncopated manner, with the chorus sung straight, and the two are bridged by an "open-throated 'aaah'" that Cam described to Billboard as a "lamenting sort of sigh" befitting the song's tone of frustration.

Co-writer and producer Tyler Johnson first conceived of the song after experiencing a similarly dead-end relationship and continued to work on the song with Cam after meeting her in 2010. The two continued making adjustments to the lyrics and arrangement over the next couple of years and eventually recorded the song after Cam signed to Arista Nashville in 2014. Instrumentalists contributing to the track include Tom Bukovac on electric guitar, Ian Fitchuk on drums, and Russ Pahl on pedal steel guitar. Positive-thinking lyrics were added toward the end of each verse to add some levity to an otherwise-dark concept, and the "swelling" pedal steel guitar at the start of the track served to balance out a "rhythmic heaviness" identified by Johnson. Critics have praised the song's mid-tempo groove as a "sweet spot" for Cam's vocals and the production for effectively framing the song's narrative.

== Live performances ==
Cam performed "Mayday" and announced the song as her next single during an appearance on The Ellen Degeneres Show airing January 29, 2016.

== Personnel ==
From Untamed liner notes.

Musicians

- Camaron Ochs – lead vocals, background vocals
- Tom Bukovac – electric guitar
- Peter Dyer – piano
- Ian Fitchuk – drums
- Tyler Johnson – drum programming, piano, background vocals
- Tony Lucido – bass guitar
- Lindsay Marias – background vocals
- Russ Pahl – pedal steel guitar
- Douglas Charles Showalter – acoustic guitar
- Zachary Werner – drum programming

Technical

- Jeff Bhasker – production
- Jon Casetelli – mixing
- Tyler Johnson – production
- Lindsey Marias – vocal production
- Melissa Mattey – engineering
- Ryan Nasci – engineering
- Zachary Werner – production, engineering

== Chart performance ==
=== Weekly charts ===
Chart (2016)	Peak position
Canada Country (Billboard)	34
US Country Airplay (Billboard)	36
US Hot Country Songs (Billboard)	32

=== Year-end charts ===
Chart (2016)	Position
US Hot Country Songs (Billboard)	97
