= Untamed (Cam album) =

Studio album by Cam
- Released: December 11, 2015
- Recorded: 2010–2015
- Genre: Country
- Length: 37:24
- Label: Arista Nashville; RCA
- Producer: Jeff Bhasker; Tyler Johnson; Luke Laird; Anders Mouridsen; Camaron Ochs; Douglas Charles Showalter; Zachary Werner

Cam chronology
Welcome to Cam Country (2015)	Untamed (2015)	The Otherside (2020)

Singles from Untamed
- 1. "My Mistake" Released: March 23, 2015; 2. "Burning House" Released: June 16, 2015; 3. "Mayday" Released: February 15, 2016

Untamed is the debut major-label studio album and second overall album by American country music artist Cam. It was released on December 11, 2015, by Arista and RCA Records. The project was mainly produced by Jeff Bhasker, Tyler Johnson, and Cam.

The album's launch was fueled by the song "Burning House", a single released in mid 2015 that became her breakthrough hit. Untamed was nearly completed before the song's success, having been a project five years in the making. Mainly recorded in Cam's home state of California, the album's content incorporates electronic sounds mixed in with country pop elements.

The lyrical content of Untamed is derived from the scenes of Cam's own life. It addresses themes associated with heartbreak, loss, and spontaneity. Untamed received critical acclaim upon its release. Critics responded to Cam's vocal delivery, as well as the album's various musical styles. The album also achieved commercial success, reaching top positions on major Billboard charts upon its initial release.

== Background and production ==
Cam began working on Untamed in 2010, co-collaborating with Jeff Bhasker and Tyler Johnson on the album's songs and production. Bhasker is known for his production work with pop artists Bruno Mars, Lana Del Rey, and Fun. Cam initially created a Kickstarter campaign to fund the album's recording. She called the process, "a fun, long journey of self-discovery," in an interview with iHeartRadio. Cam first collaborated in songwriting with Tyler Johnson, who had been working under the wing of Jeff Bhasker. When first approaching Bhasker with the project's songs, he stated they were "not good enough". Ultimately, Bhasker collaborated with the pair to write and produce the album's material.

Cam drew inspiration for the album's production from Eric Church's 2011 release Chief. She had admiration for the sound Church crafted with producer Jay Joyce to make the album. In an interview with Rolling Stone, Cam said that she kept the CD version of Chief in her car for months. Zac Brown Band also helped draw inspiration for the album's production and overall sound. Within this five-year period, Untamed was developed in various recording studios, including locations in Nashville, Tennessee, Venice, and Burbank, California. The project was mastered in Pasadena, California.

== Writing and composition ==
According to Cam, all of the tracks on Untamed are autobiographical and encompass "lessons" learned personally and professionally. Cam co-wrote all eleven of the album's tracks. The record's overall message can also be explained in the album cover. Cam detailed her reasons for choosing a lemon to drink on the cover art. She intended for the cover to represent how life sometimes presents things that "you don’t necessarily want to deal with". Instead of "watering it down and sweetening it up", it should be confronted and dealt with "head on".

The fourth track "Burning House" is about a dream she had about her ex-boyfriend. Estranged for two years, she had planned to see him yet again a mutual friend's party. The night before the party, Cam dreamed that he was stuck inside a burning house and she ran inside to stay with him so he did not have to die alone. Cam recalled the way fans reacted to the song: "I get stopped all the time and people tell me they heard it on, in their car, they had to pull over and cry. So, it makes me so happy that a song that is very vulnerable for me, because I'm basically admitting that I was a jerk to someone else and that there's no way I can fix it in real life, and I'm stuck trying to fix it in my dreams."

"Village" was written about Cam's childhood friend named Claire Rudolph, whose brother was killed in an avalanche. She described Claire's brother as, "the nice guy that everybody knew and loved to be around." He would often drive Cam and Claire to their high school each morning, since he was old enough to obtain a driver's license. Cam commented in 2015 that his death was one of the first times she lost a person relatively close to her. When recording Untamed, she remembered the tragic events surrounding his death, which made her think of a village. In an interview with iHeartRadio she stated, "It's just that your heart is made up and shaped by all these people that have loved you in your life, and that you have loved. So I pictured it as this little village with all these little houses in it, and the people that have loved you live in there, and even when it feels like they're gone, they're never really gone."

== Critical reception ==
Professional ratings
Review scores
Source	Rating
Allmusic	4/5 stars
Roughstock	4.5/5 stars
Country Exclusive	7/10
Focus on the 615	5/5 stars

Untamed has received critical acclaim from music critics. Madison Vain of Entertainment Weekly commented that Cam, "meshes old-school country storytelling (a result of a grandfather who was a Patsy Cline devotee) with gorgeous harmonies (a nod to her high school obsession with the Indigo Girls), and an unapologetic commitment to her craft (which she credits to being inspired by St. Vincent’s handiwork, but we’re willing to bet it’s a trait she comes by all her own)." Vain also went on to highlight several of the album's tracks including "Hungover on Heartache", "Country Ain't Never Been Pretty", and "Village". Roughstock writer Matt Bjorke gave Untamed four and a half out of five stars, calling the album, "an eleven track cornucopia of confident rhythms, rhymes and reason and instantly announces a major force in country music is about to blossom before our eyes." Bjorke also drew similarities between Cam and 90s country artists the Dixie Chicks and Shania Twain in songwriting and styling.

Jon Pareles of The New York Times praised the album's production, noting that the "thumping tom-tom beat" and "handlcaps" ultimately make Cam a "21st-century radio-ready performer." Pareles would then comment, "But for all the banjo picking on the album, Cam isn’t pledged to traditionalism. The tracks are punched up, with spacious mixes and hefty drumbeats, by Cam’s two fellow executive producers and co-writers: Tyler Johnson, who’s responsible for much of the electronic programming in the background, and Jeff Bhasker, a producer known for pop hits by Fun., Bruno Mars and Alicia Keys. All the better; Cam’s voice is strong enough to seize the foreground, and her songs deserve the push." Allmusic's Stephen Thomas Erlewine gave Untamed four out of five stars on his review. Erlewine explained that the album's production will aid in its success in the country market, "That ease, that grace are what brings Untamed into the province of prime commercial country: it's crisp, open-hearted, and friendly, fresh in its presentation and classical in its construction, so it appeals to a wide audience without ever seeming like it's pandering." Erlewine also wrote that the production might be too "clean and snappy" to "obscure how sturdily the songs are constructed". He then stated that those characteristics are "actually a plus" in the album's sound.

Billy Dukes of Taste of Country commented that although Cam does not "show tremendous range", she does exhibit "ever lilting word rides on a dozen notes like she’s Dolly Parton." Dukes also described his mixed feelings about the production of Untamed: "At times, the newcomer’s lyrics get lost in the production, but Jeff Bhasker and Tyler Johnson take sweet liberties with the Nashville sound. Listen to the album through headphones to hear a new fill, lick, backing vocal or riff every time. Some — like the descending bass line at the bridge on the opening track “Untamed” — are frightening. But like anything new, what's scary becomes beautiful if given time." Patrice from Focus of the 615 rated the album five out of five stars, calling Cam "...a little bit of traditional country mixed with the new country blended with a large dose of authenticity." Nick Jarman of the website For the Country Record considered the album to be "not as good as I was hoping". Jarman compared Untamed to that of Chris Janson's 2015 release Buy Me a Boat stating, "it is a decent enough record, but failed to live up to its lead single, and whilst they are both good listens, ‘Untamed’, like ‘Buy Me A Boat’ is destined to be forgotten after the initial excitement dies down."

Despite the album's December release, some publications included Untamed on their lists of "year-end albums". Rolling Stone rated the project at number fifteen on their list of the "Forty Best Country Albums of 2015". The magazine called Cam "fresh, fly, wild and bold", while also stating that she " already sounds like one of the most secure in the game." Entertainment Weekly's Madison Vain placed the album in the fourth position in her review of the "Ten Best Country Albums of 2015". Vain especially highlighted the single "Burning House", calling it a "smoldering ballad".

== Commercial performance and singles ==
Untamed was officially released on December 11, 2015, through Arista Nashville and RCA Records. It debuted at number two on the Billboard Top Country Albums chart for the week of December 21, 2015, selling 37,000 copies within its first week. Untamed became the highest-selling debut country album since Sam Hunt's Montevallo (November 2014) and the highest-selling female country debut since Jennifer Nettles launched That Girl (February 2014). Additionally, Untamed debuted in the twelfth position on the Billboard 200 albums chart and the forty-third position on the Canadian Albums Chart. As of November 2016 the album has sold 142,200 copies in the United States.

"My Mistake" was Cam's first single issued from what would later be Untamed. The single was first issued on March 23, 2015, to country radio stations. It failed to become a significant hit, only reaching number fifty-two on the Billboard Country Airplay chart on April 11, 2015.

"Burning House" was released as the next single in June 2015 upon a noteworthy performance on The Bobby Bones Show. It became country radio's "most added song" that July after being programmed to a total of ninety five stations. It rose in positions above songs including "Save It for a Rainy Day" by Kenny Chesney and "Buy Me a Boat" by Chris Janson. The song has since sold over 667,000 copies in the United States and has reached the top five of the Billboard Hot Country Songs and Country Airplay charts.

"Mayday" was released as the album's third single on February 15, 2016. Cam announced the song's release month prior and performed it on The Ellen DeGeneres Show on January 29.

== Track listing ==
Standard edition
No.	Title	Writer(s)	Length
1.	"Untamed"	Camaron Ochs; Tyler Johnson; Casey Beathard	3:30
2.	"Hungover on Heartache"	Ochs; Johnson; Zachary Werner	3:13
3.	"Mayday"	Ochs; Johnson	3:36
4.	"Burning House"	Ochs; Johnson; Jeff Bhasker	3:51
5.	"Cold in California"	Ochs; Johnson; Jeremy Spillman	3:10
6.	"My Mistake"	Ochs; Johnson	3:22
7.	"Runaway Train"	Ochs; Anders Mouridsen; Bhasker	3:01
8.	"Half Broke Heart"	Ochs; Luke Laird; Johnson	3:06
9.	"Want It All"	Ochs; Johnson; Phil Vassar	3:09
10.	"Country Ain't Never Been Pretty"	Ochs; Mouridsen	3:39
11.	"Village"	Ochs; David Manzoor; Natalie Murphy	3:55
Total length:			37:24

== Personnel ==
Credits are adapted from liner notes of Untamed.

Musicians

- Alex Balderston – bass guitar
- Christian Bengard – background vocals
- Travis Bengard – background vocals
- Pat Bergeson – harmonica
- Jeff Bhasker – piano, background vocals
- Tom Bukovac – electric guitar
- Sarah Buxton – background vocals
- Joeie Canaday – bass guitar
- Jon Castelli – clapping
- Kris Donegan – electric guitar
- Glen Duncan – banjo, bouzouki, dobro, fiddle, acoustic guitar, mandolin
- Peter Dyer – moog synthesizer, piano, sound effects
- Connie Ellisor – violin
- Ian Fitchuk – drums
- Carl Gorodetzky – string contractor
- Jim Grosjean – viola
- Kristen Hilkert – background vocals
- Tyler Johnson – clapping, drum programming, electric guitar, juno synthesizer, keyboards, moog synthesizer, piano, background vocals
- Steve Jordan – drums
- Luke Laird – acoustic guitar
- Tony Lucido – bass guitar, soloist
- Lindsay Marias – background vocals
- Melissa Mattey – string arrangements
- Bobby Maylack – background vocals
- Anders Mouridsen – banjo, acoustic guitar, electric guitar, background vocals
- Dan Needham – drums
- Camaron Ochs – lead vocals, background vocals
- Ernesto Olvera – clapping
- Russ Pahl – pedal steel guitar
- Carol Rabinowitz – cello
- Alex Salibian – electric guitar
- Doug Showalter – drum programming, acoustic guitar, electric guitar, background vocals
- Hamilton Ulmer – string arrangements
- Walle Wahlgren – drums
- Zachary Werner – clapping, drum programming, background vocals

Creative

- Creative direction, photography, and design – Ninelle Efremova
- Creative producer – Tyler N. Morgan
- Hair – Kerrie Urban
- Makeup – Adam J. Breuchaud
- Manicure artist – Jolene Brodeur
- Styling – Basia Richard

Technical

- Jeff Bhakser – production (all tracks), executive production
- Tyler Johnson – production (all tracks), executive production
- Luke Laird – production ("Half Broke Heart")
- Anders Mouridsen – production ("Runaway Train", "Country Ain't Never Been Pretty")
- Camaron Ochs – executive production
- Douglas Charles Showalter – production ("Runaway Train")
- Zachary Werner – production ("Mayday")

== Charts ==
=== Weekly charts ===
Chart (2015–17)	Peak position
Australian Albums (ARIA)	61
Canadian Albums (Billboard)	43
Scottish Albums (OCC)	65
US Billboard 200	12
US Top Country Albums (Billboard)	2

=== Year-end charts ===
Chart (2016)	Position
US Billboard 200	167
US Top Country Albums (Billboard)	19

== Release history ==
Region	Date	Format	Label	Ref.
Canada	December 11, 2015	CD; digital download	Sony Music Canada	
United States	December 11, 2015	CD; digital download	Arista Nashville; RCA	
