= Cam (singer) =

American country music singer and songwriter (born 1984)

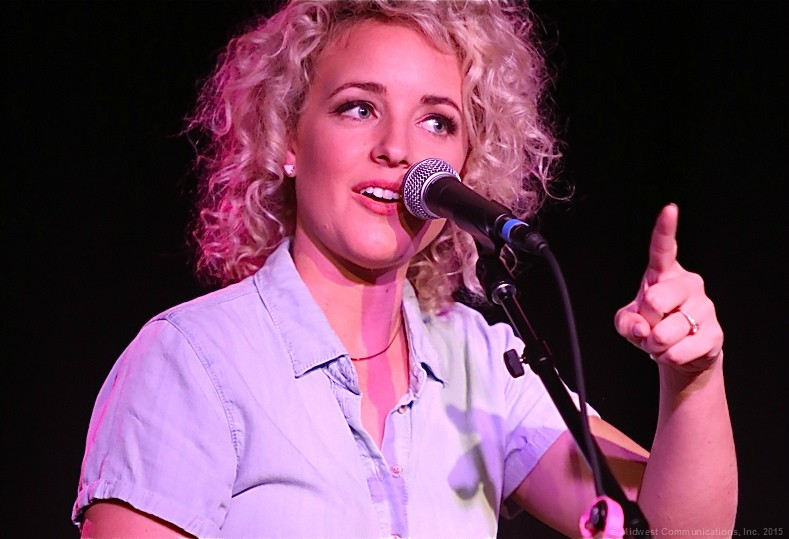
- Cam performing live in 2015
- Born: Camaron Marvel Ochs; November 19, 1984 (age 41); Huntington Beach, California, U.S.
- Education: University of California, Davis
- Occupations: Singer; songwriter
- Years active: 2010–present
- Spouse: Adam Weaver (m. 2016)
- Children: 1
- Musical career
- Genres: Country pop
- Instrument: Vocals
- Labels: Rubber Room; Arista Nashville; RCA/Thirty Tigers
- Website: camcountry.com

Signature
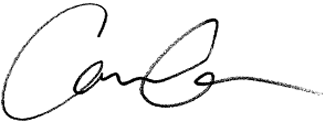

Camaron Marvel Ochs (born November 19, 1984), known professionally as Cam, is an American country music singer and songwriter. She began her career as a songwriter and has composed material for artists including Beyoncé, Sam Smith and Miley Cyrus. In 2010, she released her debut studio album Heartforward on an independent record label. Signing with Sony Music Entertainment, she released her debut major label EP in March 2015, Welcome to Cam Country, followed by the studio album Untamed later that same year. Her third album was The Otherside, released on Triple Tigers in 2020. Her second single "Burning House" is her most commercially successful, peaking at number two on the Billboard Hot Country Songs and Country Airplay charts. The song received a Best Country Solo Performance nomination at the 58th Annual Grammy Awards and a Triple Platinum certification by the Recording Industry Association of America (RIAA).

== Early life ==
Cam was born on November 19, 1984, in Huntington Beach, California, and was raised in Lafayette, California, a suburb in the San Francisco Bay Area. She also spent time in Oceanside, California, where her grandparents operated a ranch. They helped develop Cam's appreciation for country music, listening to and performing it regularly. Pursuing music throughout high school and college, she sang in various choral groups. This included performing in the Contra Costa Children's Chorus, where she learned to sing in 14 languages. She attended the University of California, Davis as an undergraduate student, studying psychology. There, she formed an all-female collegiate a cappella group called The Spokes and learned to play the guitar while studying abroad in the Netherlands. She developed confidence in playing the instrument on a trip to Nepal. Taking residency in a rural mountain community, she lived for several weeks with limited electricity and basic needs; in addition, she developed a friendship with various Canadian musicians and started playing the guitar more consistently. In a 2010 interview, Cam stated that she grew more confident in playing once from the trip.

Following college, she sporadically performed music but mostly pursued other interests. This included work in research labs, including one at Stanford University. Yet she remained conflicted about the choices she made. A meeting with a college professor influenced Cam's choice to embark on a full-fledged music career. The professor said to her, "Just picture yourself at 80 years old. Looking back at your life, what would you regret not doing: music or psychology?'"

== Career ==
=== 2010–2014: Early beginnings ===
In 2010, Cam released her debut studio album titled Heartforward via the independent Rubber Room label. Credited to her full name of Camaron Ochs, the album contained contemporary pop songs. Amber Schadewald of the San Francisco Bay Guardian called the album a brand of folk pop that "is light and sweet, with genuine lyrics that ask listeners to live with their 'heartforward'". Songs written for the project were based on experiences from her trip to Nepal. She promoted Heartforward through performances in Oakland and San Francisco, California, including shows at the Stork Club and Mama Buzz.

Cam soon moved to Los Angeles, California, and began collaborating with songwriter and producer Tyler Johnson. She recorded some demos with Johnson in an attempt to attract Faith Hill, eventually leading to the recordings being heard by Tim McGraw's manager. Her song "Fall Madly in Love with You" was chosen as a track for Cut to Impress, the 2013 debut album from Maggie Rose. Miley Cyrus also recorded one of Cam's songs, "Maybe You're Right", on her 2013 album Bangerz. The success of these songs led her to move to Nashville, Tennessee; there, began writing music for other artists, turning down a publishing deal in attempt to prove herself on her own. She launched a Kickstarter campaign in 2013 to produce 10 songs with Johnson. The campaign was supported by producer Jeff Bhasker, known best for his work with artists that include Beyoncé, fun., Bruno Mars, and P!nk. The same year Cam toured Denmark and Sweden with Helsingborg band Karavan, having previously collaborated with Anders Mouridsen of the group while in Los Angeles.

Cam released a single in 2013 titled "Down This Road" with the encouragement of manager Lindsay Marias. Through a photo posted on Instagram, local radio director Michael Bryan discovered the song and played it on the air. According to Cam, radio airplay of the single helped her choose which label she wanted to sign to. Ultimately, she chose to meet with Doug Morris, the director of Sony Music Entertainment. She flew to the label's headquarters in New York City to meet with him. Using only an acoustic guitar, she sang a song she had already been developing, "Burning House". Morris started humming along to the chorus and stated, "This is the reason why I got into the music business." He would later ask her to perform the song at the Songwriters Hall of Fame ceremony. She was soon signed to Sony's country division, Arista Nashville in 2014 and toured nationally with Dan + Shay that same year on their Where It All Began tour.

=== 2015–2017: Breakthrough ===
In early 2015, Arista Nashville released Cam's first single for them, "My Mistake". In March, the song debuted at No. 58 on the Billboard Country Airplay chart. The song peaked at number 52 only a few weeks later. Still using her full name (Camaron Ochs) during the single's promotion, she ultimately shortened it to "Cam" because some people found her last name "too hard to pronounce". "My Mistake" preceded Cam's debut EP, Welcome to Cam Country, released in March 2015. It contained four songs, with Bhasker and Johnson serving as producers. It peaked at No. 31 on the Billboard Top Country Albums chart, No. 88 on the Billboard 200, and No. 5 on the Top Heatseekers survey.

"Burning House" served as her next single. She performed the song live on the radio program The Bobby Bones Show, which attracted and fueled attention to the song. Sony Music Entertainment, of which Arista Nashville is a division, then arranged a meeting and decided to release the track as a single on June 16, 2015, after the song had initial success on the iTunes charts. "Burning House" became a top-five hit on the Billboard country songs and country airplay charts. It also was the highest-selling female country song of 2015, selling more than 500,000 copies in the United States. In addition the song received nominations at the 2016 Grammy Awards, Academy of Country Music Awards, and Country Music Association Awards. In January 2022 "Burning House" was certified triple-platinum by the Recording Industry Association of America (RIAA). The success of the song led to the release of her first Arista Nashville album Untamed on December 11, 2015. Also produced largely by Bhasker and Johnson, it consisted of 11 tracks all co-written by Cam, including all of the songs from the EP. It debuted at number two on the Top Country Albums chart and was the highest-selling debut country studio album of 2015. Rolling Stone ranked the album at number 15 on their list of the "40 Best Country Albums of 2015". The magazine commented, "For an artist at the start of career, Cam already sounds like one of the most secure in the game." "Mayday" was released as the album's third single in February 2016. It was a minor Top 40 hit on the country charts, peaking at number 36 on Billboard Country Airplay.

In October 2017, Cam announced a new single titled "Diane". She promoted the song with several live performances including on Good Morning America, The Late Late Show with James Corden, and as a duet with a contestant on season 16 of American Idol. In April 2018, "Diane" was added to the BBC Radio 2 A-list and hit No. 1 on iTunes for 5 weeks. Also in 2017, Cam, along with Sam Smith and Tyler Johnson, co-wrote the song "Palace" for Smith's 2017 album The Thrill of It All and providing background vocals and guitar to the track. The song saw international success and was highlighted in the Holiday "Sway" commercial for Apple which led to its reaching No. 1 on the Billboard Top TV Commercials Chart. The widespread embrace of "Palace" included much international success, specifically in Japan, where Smith performed the song on multiple TV talk shows. Cam opened for Smith on the Summer US leg of his 2018 The Thrill Of It All Tour. Cam has also shared the stage with Tim McGraw and Faith Hill on their Soul2Soul Tour as well as Harry Styles.

=== 2018–present: Transition to RCA ===
In July 2018, Cam released "Road to Happiness" and parted ways with Arista Nashville. In 2019, she provided vocals for Diplo's song "So Long" for his Diplo Presents Thomas Wesley, Chapter 1: Snake Oil album.

On June 29, 2020, it was announced that Cam had signed a new partnership for radio promotion with Nashville-based Triple Tigers in a joint venture with her label RCA Records. "Classic" was released on July 17, 2020, as her first country radio single since "Diane" in 2017. Her critically acclaimed sophomore album, The Otherside, was released on October 30, 2020. For this release, she once again enlisted producers Tyler Johnson (Harry Styles, Miley Cyrus) and Jeff Bhasker (Kanye West, Alicia Keys). The record featured the international Jolene-in-reverse hit “Diane,” the song “Till There's Nothing Left,” plus songwriting from Avicii, Harry Styles, Jack Antonoff, and Sam Smith.

In 2024, she contributed songwriting, production and backing vocals for Beyoncé's Cowboy Carter album (“American Requiem,” “Amen,” “Protector,” “Tyrant,” “Daughter”). This was followed by the announcement of a new album titled All Things Light, which was released on July 18, 2025.

== Artistry ==
Cam was exposed to classic country music at an early age from the time spent on her grandparents' ranch. They introduced her to the musical sounds of Patsy Cline, Bonnie Raitt and Willie Nelson. She was largely influenced by the vocal phrasing of Cline and Ray Charles. She also developed an appreciation for the Chicks and the Indigo Girls, commenting that she was "so into those female harmonies". She additionally cites Bob Dylan, Joni Mitchell, and Randy Newman as influences on her songwriting style. Although she has a variety of musical influences, Cam stated that country music is where she felt most connected to. In a 2015 interview with Rolling Stone, she explained her reasoning: "I grew up singing in a lot of different languages and a lot of world music choirs, so I have a lot of musical influences. But the songwriting structure of country music is the standard in my mind. ... That structure seems to feel the most homey to me."

== Personal life ==
In September 2015, Cam became engaged to Adam Weaver, a business broker and owner of Nashville Business Brokers. In October 2016, the couple married in a small ceremony in a California desert. In December 2019, she gave birth to her first child, Lucy. Shortly after giving birth, Cam posted on social media that she was a "breech at 39wks, a next-day c-section (ouch) & here we are... three of us now."

Cam is a vocal advocate for music education and inclusion. She spoke on the psychology of music in her 2017 TEDx Talk at the University of Nevada. Cam is on the Academy of Country Music (ACM) Board and was invited to join The Recording Academy's Task Force on Diversity and Inclusion in 2018. In 2018, Cam joined the speaker list on Hello Sunshine x Together Live's touring event

== Discography ==
Studio albums

- Heartforward (2010)
- Untamed (2015)
- The Otherside (2020)
- All Things Light (2025)

== Awards and nominations ==
Year	Recipient/Nominated work	Association	Award	Result	Ref.
2016	"Burning House"	Grammy Awards	Best Country Solo Performance	Nominated	
2016	"Burning House"	ACM Awards	Single Record of the Year	Nominated	
2016	"Burning House"	ACM Awards	Song of the Year	Nominated	
2016	"Burning House"	ACM Awards	Video of the Year	Nominated	
2016	Cam	ACM Awards	New Female Vocalist of the Year	Nominated	
2016	Cam	American Music Awards	Favorite Female Country Artist	Nominated	
2016	"Burning House"	CMA Awards	Song of the Year	Nominated	
2016	"Burning House"	CMA Awards	Music Video of the Year	Nominated	
2017	Cam	ACM Awards	New Female Vocalist of the Year	Nominated	
2024	Cowboy Carter	Grammy Awards	Album of The Year	Won	

== Tours ==
Supporting act

- Strait Vegas Tour (2017) with George Strait
- Somewhere on a Beach Tour (2016) with Dierks Bentley

Headlining

- The Burning House Tour (2016)
- Best Coast Tour (2017)
- Listening Room Series (2018)
- "Diane" European Tour (2018)
- Oh the Places We'll Go Tour (2019)

The Slow Down Tour (2025)
