= MMXX (Diplo album) =

2020 studio album by Diplo

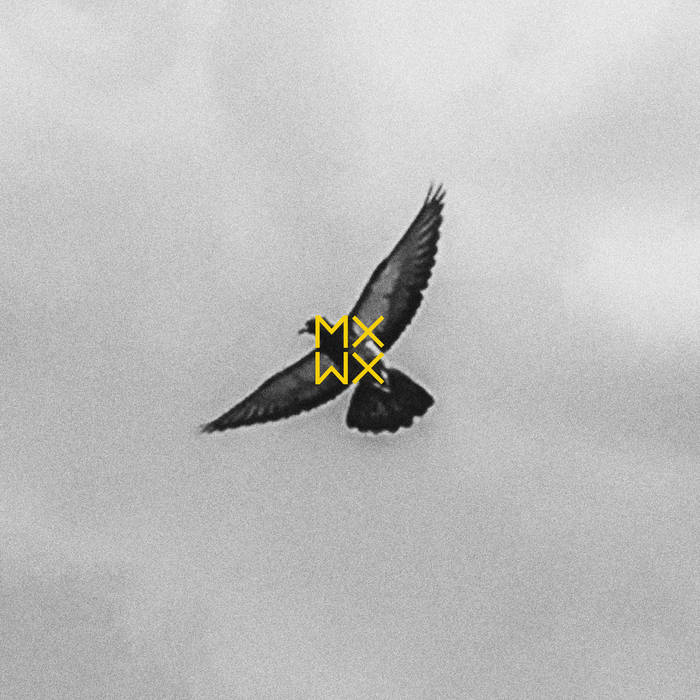

Studio album by Diplo
- Released: September 4, 2020
- Recorded: 2020
- Genres: Ambient; Experimental; Electronic
- Length: 39:33
- Label: Higher Ground
- Producer: Diplo

Diplo chronology
Chapter 1: Snake Oil (2020)	MMXX (2020)	Diplo (2022)

MMXX is the third studio album by American DJ and record producer Diplo. It was released on September 4, 2020, through his label Higher Ground. The album is Diplo’s first full-length ambient project and was created during the early months of the COVID-19 pandemic while he was isolated in Los Angeles.

The title uses Roman numerals for the year 2020. Diplo described the project as the only music he made that year, stating he did not want to write pop songs or participate in remote sessions. Instead, he worked alone with keyboards and a rarely used guitar, drawing inspiration from the empty streets and atmosphere of lockdown-era Los Angeles. He characterized the album as being about hope rather than darkness.

== Background ==
Following the May 2020 release of his country project Chapter 1: Snake Oil, Diplo turned toward ambient and experimental electronic music. He had been exploring ambient sounds for several years through informal collaborations and live sets in Los Angeles. The pandemic provided the conditions to develop the material into a full album.

In a statement accompanying the release, Diplo said the music served as a stress reliever and meditative experience. He expressed hope that listeners would use it similarly, emphasizing the importance of mental health. Proceeds from the album were donated to mental health organizations including Beam Collective and The Loveland Foundation.

The album was first made available exclusively on the meditation app Calm before receiving a full commercial release on September 4, 2020.

== Composition ==
MMXX consists of twelve largely instrumental tracks titled sequentially from “MMXX – I” to “MMXX – XII.” The music is characterized by atmospheric synthesizers, sparse percussion, evolving textures, and occasional melodic elements. Guest appearances appear on select tracks: Mikky Ekko on “III” and “IX,” Lunice on “VIII,” Good Times Ahead on “X,” and Rhye on the closing track “XII.”

Critics noted the album’s meditative quality and its departure from Diplo’s more high-energy dance and pop productions. Apple Music described it as “a vision of ambient at its most emotive and expansive,” balancing calm with subtle textural surprises.

== Critical reception ==
Reception to MMXX was generally positive among listeners familiar with ambient and experimental electronic music, with many noting its contrast to Diplo’s mainstream dance output. Reviewers highlighted its atmospheric continuity, emotional tone, and suitability as meditative listening. Some observers described it as one of Diplo’s more introspective and artistically focused projects of the period.

== Track listing ==
MMXX track listing
No.	Title	Writer(s)	Producer(s)	Length
1.	"I"	Thomas Wesley Pentz	Diplo	2:40
2.	"II"	Pentz	Diplo	3:46
3.	"III" (with Mikky Ekko)	Pentz; Mikky Ekko; Maximilian Jaeger	Diplo; Mikky Ekko; Maximilian Jaeger	3:03
4.	"IV"	Pentz	Diplo	3:20
5.	"V"	Pentz	Diplo	4:12
6.	"VI"	Pentz	Diplo	2:56
7.	"VII"	Pentz	Diplo	3:32
8.	"VIII" (with Lunice)	Pentz; Lunice Fermin Pierre II	Diplo; Lunice	3:48
9.	"IX" (with Mikky Ekko)	Pentz; Mikky Ekko; Maximilian Jaeger	Diplo; Mikky Ekko; Maximilian Jaeger	3:28
10.	"X" (with Good Times Ahead)	Pentz; Good Times Ahead	Diplo; Good Times Ahead	2:11
11.	"XI"	Pentz	Diplo	2:53
12.	"XII" (with Rhye)	Pentz; Rhye	Diplo; Rhye	3:40
Total length:				39:33
