= Jasbir Jassi =

Indian singer and actor (born 1970)

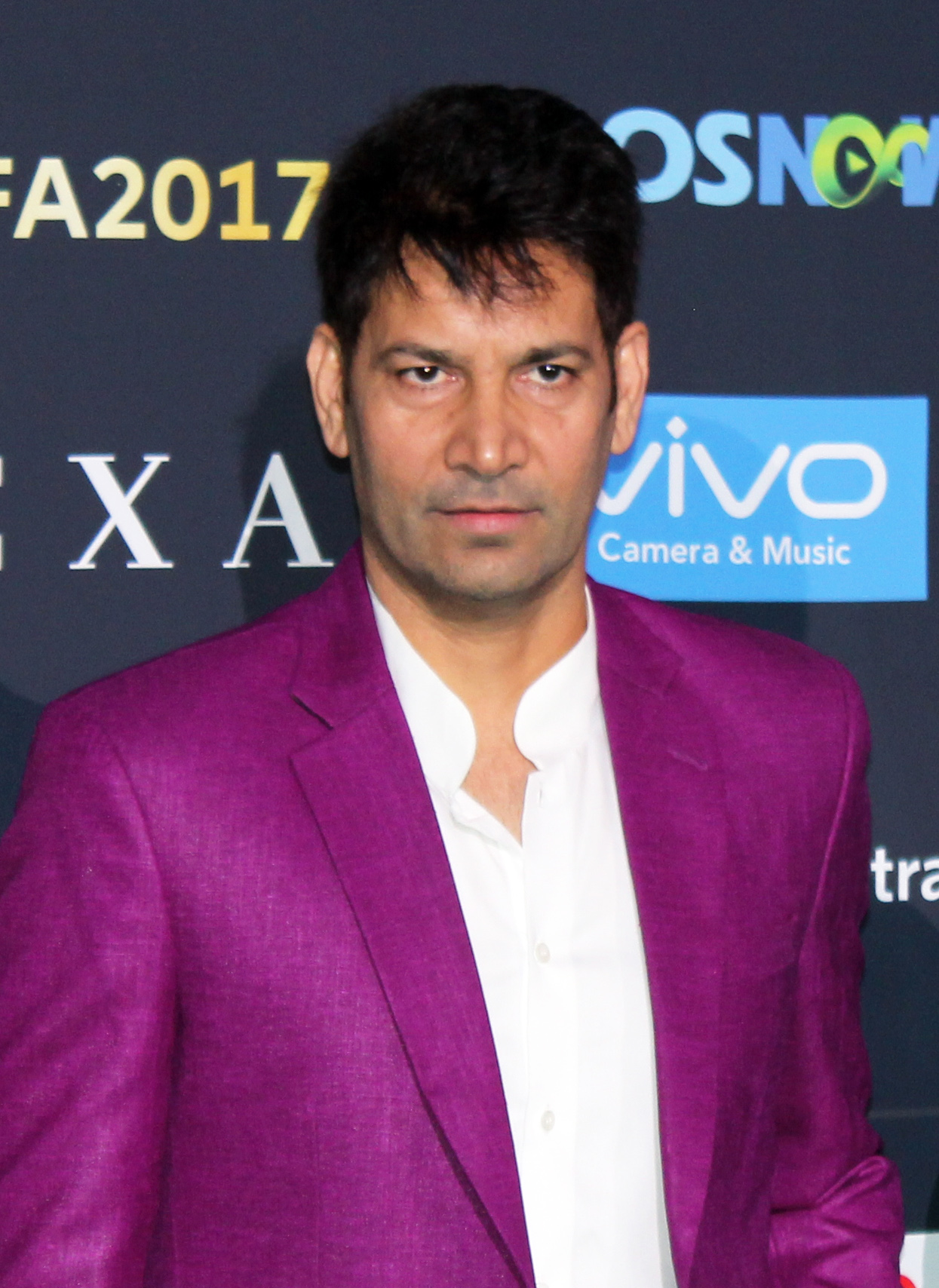
- Jasbir Jassi at 18th IIFA Awards, East Rutherford, New Jersey, US

Background information
- Born: Jasbir Singh Bains; 7 February 1970 (age 56); Gurdaspur, Punjab, India
- Occupations: Singer, actor, lyricist
- Years active: 1993–present

Jasbir Singh Bains (born 7 February 1970), better known by his stage name Jasbir Jassi, is an Indian singer, lyricist, performer and actor. As of 2016 he has released thirteen albums, his first pop album being Dil Le Gayee, released in 1998 with Times Music.

== Early life ==
Bains, was born in Dalia Mirjanpur village, Gurdaspur, Punjab, India, to Sikh parents Ajit Singh Bains and mother Prakash Kaur in Jatt Sikh Family brought up along with his two elder sisters. A first generation musician, he participated in musical plays such "Sadha Bugdu Bulo", and gave performances at the North Zone Cultural Centre.

== Career ==
He started recording for Punjabi films including Passport and Zakhmi in the late 1980s. He also sang for remix albums such as Balle Balbiro Balle. His first album release was the 1993 low-profile Channa Ve Teri Channani. He appeared along with Charanjit Ahuja in the music video of "Channa ve Teri Channi". This was followed-up with a string of hit albums, Dil Le Gayee (1998), Kudi Kudi (1999), Nishani Pyar Di (2001), Just Jassi (2002), Mukhda Chann Varga (2004) and Akh Mastani (2007). In 1989, at a National Integration Camp in Himachal Pradesh, for youth from border areas, Jassi met a Gujarati girl. The girl was from Bhuj in the Kutch area of Gujarat. She later married someone else, but Jassi traced her in 1998. In the same year, on his way to Gwalior with Sham Bhuteja of Rohtak, when Jassi was feeling upset and depressed during the journey, and in a fit of emotion told Bhuteja, "Dil Le Gayee Kudi Gujarat Di". He was inspired to compose a song recounting the incident after this line. The song, "Dil Le Gayee Kudi Gujarat Di", released as a part of his second album, Dil Le Gayee, became a commercial success. "Kudi Kudi" from his third album and "Channo Da" from Nishani Pyar Di also did extremely well.

Jassi - Back with a Bang, his ninth studio album, featuring the songs "Mehndi" and title song "Bang", was released on 16 July 2010 worldwide.

He has performed in several countries, and has appeared on the NDTV Imagine's Dhoom Macha De. On the occasion of the 73rd Independence Day, Jassi and Punjabi singer Nobby Singh released a patriotic single track 'Azaadi - The Independence' dedicated to the country in August 2021.

=== Soundtracks ===
The latest soundtrack in which Jassi performed is "Koka" from Khandaani Shafakhana (2019) with Badshah and Dhvani Bhanushali Composed by Tanishk Bagchi. He sang and composed "Ek Onkar" for the film Kesari (2019). He also sang for Patiala House (2011), in which he performed "Laungda Lashkara" with Mahalakshmi Iyer and Hard Kaur composed by Shankar-Ehsaan-Loy. Other soundtrack in which he performed include Dobara (2004) in which he performed "Pyar Mere", Hope and a Little Sugar (2006) in which he performed "Mahiya" and Mel Karade Rabba (2010) in which he performed the titular song. In 2015, Jassi released a song Ranjha giving the song Sufi and pahari touch. In 2016, he released the new Sufi trance song O Laal Ni written by Baba Bulle Shah. In 2018, he made a comeback with his Song Tere Thumke written by Bhatti Bhariwala released under the Music Label TPZ Records.

=== Acting ===
In 2011, his first film in a lead role, Khushiyaan, was released. He was trained by N.K. Sharma and a few others. He has also appeared in some Punjabi films including Heer Ranjha.

== Discography ==
According to Jassi's official website, he released thirteen albums:

Year	Album	Lyricist
1993	Channa Ve Teri Channani	
1998	Balle Balbiro Balle	
1998	Dil Le Gayee	
1999	Kudi Kudi	
2001	Nishani Pyar Di	
2002	Just Jassi	
2004	Mukhda Chann Warga	
2007	Akh Mastani	
2010	Jassi - Back with a Bang	
2011	Bhangra (with Ashok Masti and Jawad Ahmad)	
2014	Saawan	
2014	Shaheed Bhagat Singh	
2014	Dhol	
2015	Ranjha	
2018	Tere Thumke	Bhatti Bhariwala
2020	Tere Bina	Gopi Sidhu
2020	Main Hova Tu Hove	Gopi Sidhu
2020	Ik Sufna	
2020	Allah Noor Upaya	
2021	Mere kool	Gopi Sidhu
2021	Badnaam.	Gopi Sidhu

== Filmography ==
Year	Film	Role	Notes
2009	Heer Ranjha	Muraad	
2011	Khushiyaan	main lead	Debut Actor
2014	Dil Vil Pyaar Vyaar	Govt. officer	
