= So Long (Diplo song) =

Single by Thomas Wesley and Cam

from the album Chapter 1: Snake Oil
- Released: April 24, 2019
- Genre: Country
- Length: 2:52
- Label: Mad Decent
- Songwriter(s): Thomas Wesley Pentz; Camaron Ochs; Sasha Sloan; Henry Agincourt Allen; Tyler Johnson; Diana Gordon; Benjamin Mathis; Michael Wilson Hardy
- Producer(s): Diplo; King Henry

Diplo singles chronology
"Hold You Tight" (2019)	"So Long" (2019)	"Win Win" (2019)

"So Long" is a song by American producer Diplo and American country singer Cam, released as a single through Mad Decent on April 24, 2019. It is the first in a planned series of collaborations with country music artists by Diplo under (part of) his real name, Thomas Wesley. (Note: The cover introduces this credit as "Diplo Presents Thomas Wesley", although the song is still listed under Diplo's name.) The lyric video was released the same day as the song.

== Promotion ==
A lyric video was uploaded by Diplo to his official YouTube channel on April 24, 2019.

== Track listing ==
Digital download
No.	Title	Length
1.	"So Long" (with Cam)	2:52

== Charts ==
Chart (2019)	Peak position
New Zealand Hot Singles (RMNZ)	34
US Hot Dance/Electronic Songs (Billboard)	26

== Release history ==
Region	Date	Format	Label	Ref.
Various	24 April 2019	Digital download	Mad Decent	
