= Burning House =

Single by Cam

from the album Untamed
- Released: June 16, 2015
- Recorded: 2015
- Genre: Country
- Length: 3:51
- Label: Arista Nashville
- Songwriters: Camaron Ochs; Jeff Bhasker; Tyler Johnson
- Producers: Jeff Bhasker; Tyler Johnson

Cam singles chronology
"My Mistake" (2015)	"Burning House" (2015)	"Mayday" (2016)

"Burning House" is a song recorded by American country music singer Cam. It was released on June 16, 2015, as the second single from her second album Untamed. Co-written by Cam along with Tyler Johnson and Jeff Bhasker, the song was inspired by a dream that she had about attempting to rescue her boyfriend from a house that was on fire.

"Burning House" peaked at No. 2 on both the Billboard Country Airplay and Hot Country Songs charts respectively. The song also charted on the Hot 100, peaking at No. 29. The song was certified Platinum by the Recording Industry Association of America (RIAA), and has sold 1,125,000 copies in the United States as of November 2016. It received similar chart success in Canada, peaking at No. 2 on the Country chart and No. 46 on the Canadian Hot 100. It was also certified Gold by Music Canada, denoting sales of over 40,000 units in that country. The accompanying music video for the song was directed by Trey Fanjoy.

== History and content ==
According to Billboard, the idea for the song came when Cam learned that an ex-boyfriend of hers would be at a party that she was attending, and that night, she had a dream that she was trying to rescue him from a burning house. She recounted the dream to producer Tyler Johnson via Skype, and he offered a guitar riff inspired by Metallica's "Nothing Else Matters" while she came up with "two off-the-cuff opening lines that alternate between standard 4/4 time and 3/4 bars". When they recorded the song with producer Jeff Bhasker, Johnson played acoustic guitar on the recording, with a few notes spliced in from Cam's touring guitarist Doug Showalter due to Johnson having difficulty playing the last four notes of the riff. The song also features a piano, a muted bass, and a small string section arranged by Hamilton Ulmer.

The song has a play length of 3 minutes and 51 seconds. It is composed in the key of A minor, and alternates between 4/4 and 3/4 time signatures. Cam's vocal ranges just over an octave, from G_{3} to A_{4}.

== Reception ==
=== Critical ===
Billy Dukes of Taste of Country praised Cam’s voice and the musical arrangement, saying “The newcomer’s performance is stark and personal. Her production team does a great job of not getting in the way.” He also said that “Cam is the one who wronged her man, not vice-versa. The other way around is an over-told story, but there’s nothing unoriginal” about "Burning House".

Billboard ranked "Burning House" at No. 24 on its year-end list for 2015: "In one four-minute track, Cam manages to pack in frustration, despair, anguish, and torment. But what makes it beautiful is the wounded vocal melody set against gentle guitar strumming and understated strings. This is the rare quiet breakout hit of 2015." At the 58th Annual Grammy Awards, "Burning House" was nominated for Best Country Solo Performance but lost to Chris Stapleton's "Traveller".

=== Commercial ===
The song was released after Cam performed it twice on The Bobby Bones Show, and the song entered the Hot Country Songs chart at No. 43 on the song release (chart date June 27, 2015), selling 13,000 copies. It debuted at No. 48 on the Country Airplay chart dated for July 11, 2015. It then entered the Billboard Hot 100 at No. 94 on the chart date of August 1, 2015. The song later went on to peak at No. 2. on both Hot Country Songs and Country Airplay in January 2016.

The song was certified Gold by the RIAA on October 14, 2015, Platinum on December 16, 2015, and double Platinum on August 28, 2018. The song reached over a million in sales in the US in March 2016. The song has sold 1,231,000 copies as of November 2019.

== Music video ==
The music video was directed by Trey Fanjoy and premiered in October 2015.

== Personnel ==
From Untamed liner notes.

Musical

- Jeff Bhasker – piano, background vocals
- Connie Ellisor – violin
- Carl Gorodetzky – string contractor
- Jim Grosjean – violin
- Tyler Johnson – acoustic guitar, background vocals
- Tony Lucido – bass guitar
- Anders Mouridsen – electric guitar
- Cam (as Camaron Ochs) – lead vocals, background vocals
- Carole Rabinowitz – cello
- Douglas Charles Showalter – acoustic guitar
- Hamilton Ulmer – string arrangements

Technical

- Jeff Bhasker – production
- Jon Castelli – mixing
- Tyler Johnson – production, engineering
- Lindsey Marias – vocal production
- Melissa Mattey – string engineering
- Ryan Nasci – mixing engineer
- Ernesto Olivera – engineering
- Alex Salibian – engineering

== Chart and certifications ==
=== Weekly charts ===
Chart (2015–2016)	Peak position
Canada Hot 100 (Billboard)	46
Canada Country (Billboard)	2
US Billboard Hot 100	29
US Adult Contemporary (Billboard)	21
US Adult Pop Airplay (Billboard)	39
US Country Airplay (Billboard)	2
US Hot Country Songs (Billboard)	2

=== Year-end charts ===
Chart (2015)	Position
US Country Airplay (Billboard)	58
US Hot Country Songs (Billboard)	19
Chart (2016)	Position
US Hot Country Songs (Billboard)	53

=== Certifications and sales ===
Region	Certification	Certified units/sales
Canada (Music Canada)	Platinum	80,000^{‡}
United States (RIAA)	3× Platinum	3,000,000^{‡} / 1,231,000
^{‡} Sales+streaming figures based on certification alone.
