= Jeff Bhasker =

American record producer (born 1974)

- Also known as: Billy Kraven
- Born: March 4, 1974 (age 52); Kansas City, Kansas, U.S.
- Origin: Socorro, New Mexico, U.S.
- Genres: Pop; R&B; hip-hop; pop rock
- Occupations: Record producer; songwriter
- Instruments: Vocals; keyboards; guitar; bass; drums; percussion
- Years active: 2005–present
- Labels: GOOD; Kravenworks

Jeffrey Nath Bhasker (born March 4, 1974) is an American record producer, songwriter, and multi-instrumentalist based in Los Angeles. He won the Grammy Award for Producer of the Year in 2016 and was nominated for the award in 2013.

Bhasker came to prominence as the primary producer of Kanye West's album 808s & Heartbreak (2008), and further worked with West on his subsequent albums including My Beautiful Dark Twisted Fantasy (2010), Watch the Throne (2011), his tours, and later, Donda (2021). For other artists, Bhasker has also produced the albums Some Nights (2012) by Fun., Uptown Special (2015) by Mark Ronson, and Harry Styles' self-titled debut album (2017), among others.

Bhasker has won Grammy Awards for his work on the songs "Run This Town" for Jay-Z, "All of the Lights" for Kanye West, "We Are Young" for Fun., and "Uptown Funk" for Mark Ronson.

== Early life ==
Bhasker was born in Kansas City, Kansas, and was raised in Socorro, New Mexico. His American-born mother is a pianist and his Telugu Indian-born father, Ravi Bhasker, is a medical doctor who has served as Socorro's mayor for over 30 years. Bhasker was introduced to jazz by his mother and his piano teacher. He played in the jazz band at Socorro High School, where he graduated in 1993, and then studied jazz piano and arranging at Berklee College of Music in Boston, Massachusetts.

== Career ==
Bhasker began his career gigging around Boston as a keyboardist and played in a wedding band. After playing with the 1970s-era R&B band Tavares, Bhasker moved to New York on September 11, 2001. He toured with the jam band Lettuce and began focusing more on songwriting. One of his first productions was with neo soul singer Goapele, on her album Closer (2001). Bhasker produced a song on rapper The Game's first album, The Documentary (2005).

Bhasker relocated to Los Angeles in 2005. He got a job doing demos for songwriter Diane Warren. He began writing with Bruno Mars, and songwriter and executive Steve Lindsey served as their mentor. He played cover songs in a band with Mars around Los Angeles.

Around 2007, Bhasker began his association with rapper/producer Kanye West. Initially serving as a substitute keyboardist on the recommendation of his friend and West's tour DJ A-Trak, West was impressed with his musical ability and hired him for West's Glow in the Dark Tour as his musical director. He was set to be the musical director for the cancelled Fame Kills: Starring Kanye West and Lady Gaga, before going on to be the music director of Lady Gaga's The Monster Ball Tour. Bhasker collaborated on West's albums 808s & Heartbreak, My Beautiful Dark Twisted Fantasy and the Jay-Z/Kanye West collaboration album, Watch the Throne, including the songs "Welcome to Heartbreak". "Lift Off", and "Runaway". Bhasker received the Grammy Award for Best Rap Song for West's "All of the Lights", and the Jay-Z/Rihanna/Kanye West song "Run This Town". Bhasker and West reunited on "Come to Life" on 2021's Donda.

Following this period, Bhasker would go on to produce Fun's Some Nights (2012), Uptown Special (2015) with Mark Ronson, and Harry Styles' self-titled debut album (2017). Bhasker's collaborations span multiple genres, including his work with Alicia Keys, Mark Ronson, Kid Cudi, Cam, Taylor Swift, Harry Styles, Young Thug, and more.

Bhasker co-wrote and co-produced Mark Ronson's single "Uptown Funk", which earned him a 2016 Grammy Award for Record of the Year. Additionally, he received the 2016 Grammy Award for Producer of the Year, Non-Classical for his achievements in producing that year.

His RIAA multi-platinum selling records include Kanye West's "Love Lockdown", "Runaway", "Monster" and "Power", Jay-Z's "Run this Town", Drake's "Find Your Love", Fun's "We Are Young", "Some Nights" and "Carry On", Pink's "Just Give Me a Reason", Bruno Mars' "Talking to the Moon" and "Locked out of Heaven", Mark Ronson's "Uptown Funk", Rihanna's "Kiss it Better", and Harry Styles' "Sign of the Times".

== Musical style ==
As a vocalist, Bhasker has used the alias Billy Kraven (last name credited as Craven in the interview and in the record). He explained his reasons in an interview with GQ:

It kind of started out as me creating a character to be a songwriter. I wanted to keep it separate at first, but now I kind of like the idea that people know it’s me. It kind of defines the parameters. The Billy Craven stuff is a little bit darker, it deals with social themes like the war and death. It’s Blue-Eyed Soul meets Marilyn Manson. U.G.L.Y. is more a lighter side—a lot of humor and crassness—it’s commentary on a lot of these swaggy songs. It pokes a little fun at the state of contemporary pop and urban music.

When speaking on the Billy Kraven's pseudonym in 2013, he said "I just thought it was a cooler sounding name, and I was making these kind of dark pop songs that suited it. It's kinda like Billy Joel meets Wes Craven."

== Discography ==
Title	Year	Artist(s)	Album	Credits	Written with	Produced with
"Butterflykisses"	2001	Goapele	Closer	Producer	-	-
"Thing's Don't Exist"	2001	Goapele	Closer	Producer	-	Adam Smirnoff
"Salvation"	2001	Goapele	Closer	Producer	-	-
"The Documentary"	2005	The Game	The Documentary	Co-writer/Producer	Jaceyon Taylor, Jeffrey Reed	Jeff Reed
"First Love"	2005	Goapele	Change It All	Co-writer/Producer	Goapele Mohlabane	Goapele
"4AM"	2005	Goapele	Change It All	Co-writer/Producer	Goapele Mohlabane	Goapele
"Battle of the Heart"	2005	Goapele	Change It All	Co-writer/Producer	Goapele Mohlabane, Taz Arnold, Om'Mas Keith, Shafiq Husayn	Sa-Ra Creative Partners
"Love Lockdown"	2008	Kanye West	808s & Heartbreak	Co-writer/Co-producer	Kanye West, Jenny-Bea Englishman, Malik Jones, LeNeah Menzies	Kanye West
"Long Distance"	2008	Brandy	Human	Co-writer	Bruno Mars, Phillip Lawrence, Rodney Jerkins	-
"Say You Will"	2008	Kanye West	808s & Heartbreak	Co-writer	Kanye West, Dexter Mills, Jay Jenkins	-
"Welcome to Heartbreak" (featuring Kid Cudi)	2008	Kanye West	808s & Heartbreak	Co-writer/Co-producer	Kanye West, Patrick Reynolds, Scott Mescudi	Kanye West, Plain Pat
"Amazing" (featuring Young Jeezy)	2008	Kanye West	808s & Heartbreak	Co-writer/Co-producer	Kanye West, Malik Jones, Dexter Mills, Jay Jenkins	Kanye West
"Paranoid" (featuring Mr Hudson)	2008	Kanye West	808s & Heartbreak	Co-writer/Co-producer	Kanye West, Patrick Reynolds, Scott Mescudi, Dexter Mills	Kanye West, Plain Pat
"RoboCop"	2008	Kanye West	808s & Heartbreak	Co-writer	Kanye West, Jenny-Bea Englishman, Malik Jones, Dexter Mills, Scott Mescudi, Anthony Williams, Faheem Najm, Jay Jenkins, Patrick Doyle	-
"See You in My Nightmares" (featuring Lil Wayne)	2008	Kanye West	808s & Heartbreak	Co-writer	Kanye West, Ernest Wilson, Dwayne Carter	-
"Coldest Winter"	2008	Kanye West	808s & Heartbreak	Co-producer	-	Kanye West, No I.D.
"Run This Town" (featuring Rihanna & Kanye West)	2009	Jay-Z	The Blueprint 3	Co-writer/Producer	Shawn Carter, Kanye West, Ernest Wilson, Robyn Fenty, Athanasios Alatas	-
"Hate" (featuring Kanye West)	2009	Jay-Z	The Blueprint 3	Co-writer/Producer	Shawn Carter, Kanye West	-
"My World" (featuring Billy Cravens)	2009	Kid Cudi	Man on the Moon: The; End of Day	Featured artist/Co-writer/Producer	Scott Mescudi, Patrick Reynolds, Claude Puterflam, Christian Padovan, Gerard Kawczynski	Plain Pat
"Fly Here Now"	2009	Leona Lewis	Echo	Co-writer/Producer	Leona Lewis	-
"Try Sleeping With a Broken Heart"	2009	Alicia Keys	The Element of Freedom	Co-writer/Producer	Alicia Cook, Patrick Reynolds	-
"Fever"	2009	Adam Lambert	For Your Entertainment	Co-writer/Producer	Stefani Germanotta, Robert Fusari	-
"Love Is Blind"	2009	Alicia Keys	The Element of Freedom	Co-writer/Producer	Alicia Cook	Alicia Keys
"Wait Til You See My Smile"	2009	Alicia Keys	The Element of Freedom	Co-writer/Producer	Alicia Cook, Kasseem Dean	Alicia Keys
"Like the Sea"	2009	Alicia Keys	The Element of Freedom	Co-writer/Producer	Alicia Cook	Alicia Keys
"Meiplé" (with Jay-Z)	2009	Robin Thicke	Sex Therapy: The Session	Co-producer	-	Robin Thicke, Pro Jay
"Elevatos" (with Kid Cudi)	2009	Robin Thicke	Sex Therapy: The Session	Co-writer/Producer	Robin Thicke, Scott Mescudi	Robin Thicke
"Rollacoasta" (with Estelle)	2009	Robin Thicke	Sex Therapy: The Session	Co-writer/Producer	Robin Thicke, Estelle Swaray	Robin Thicke
"City on Fire"	2009	Mary J. Blige	Stronger with Each Tear	Co-writer/Producer	Mary J. Blige, Patrick Reynolds	Plain Pat
"Find Your Love"	2010	Drake	Thank Me Later	Co-writer/Co-producer	Aubrey Graham, Kanye West, Ernest Wilson, Patrick Reynolds	Kanye West, No I.D.
"Show Me a Good Time"	2010	Drake	Thank Me Later	Co-writer/Co-producer	Aubrey Graham, Kanye West, Ernest Wilson	Kanye West, No I.D.
"Power"	2010	Kanye West	My Beautiful Dark Twisted; Fantasy	Co-writer/Additional producer	Kanye West, Larry Griffin Jr., Michael Dean, Andwele Gardner, Kenneth Lewis, Francois Bernhaim, Jean-Pierre Lang, Boris Bergman, Robert Fripp, Michael Giles, Gregory Lake, Ian McDonald, Peter Sinfield	S1, Kanye West, Mike Dean, Andrew Dawson
"Bang" (featuring CX)	2010	Jasbir Jassi	Jassi - Back with a Bang	Producer	-	-
"Kalaria"	2010	Jasbir Jassi	Jassi - Back with a Bang	Producer	-	Adam Deitch
"Mela" (featuring CX)	2010	Jasbir Jassi	Jassi - Back with a Bang	Producer	-	-
"Baliye"	2010	Jasbir Jassi	Jassi - Back with a Bang	Producer	-	-
"Talking to the Moon"	2010	Bruno Mars	Doo-Wops & Hooligans	Co-writer/Co-producer	Bruno Mars, Philip Lawrence, Ari Levine, Albert Winkler	The Smeezingtons
"Runaway" (featuring Pusha T)	2010	Kanye West	My Beautiful Dark Twisted; Fantasy	Co-writer/Co-producer	Kanye West, Emile Haynie, Terrence Thornton, Michael Dean, Malik Jones, Jonathan Branch	Kanye West, Emile Haynie, Mike Dean
"Monster" (featuring Jay-Z, Rick Ross, Nicki Minaj & Bon Iver)	2010	Kanye West	My Beautiful Dark Twisted; Fantasy	Co-writer	Kanye West, Shawn Carter, Patrick Reynolds, Michael Dean, William Roberts II, Onika Maraj, Justin Vernon	-
"Mr. Rager"	2010	Kid Cudi	Man on the Moon II: The; Legend of Mr. Rager	Producer	-	Emile Haynie
"Dark Fantasy"	2010	Kanye West	My Beautiful Dark Twisted; Fantasy	Co-writer/Additional producer	Kanye West, Robert Diggs, Ernest Wilson, Michael Dean, Malik Jones, Jonathan Anderson, Michael Oldfield	RZA, Kanye West, No I.D., Mike Dean
"All of the Lights (Interlude)"	2010	Kanye West	My Beautiful Dark Twisted; Fantasy	Co-writer	Kanye West, Malik Jones, Warren Trotter	-
"All of the Lights"	2010	Kanye West	My Beautiful Dark Twisted; Fantasy	Co-writer/Co-producer	Kanye West, Malik Jones, Warren Trotter	Kanye West
"Lost in the World" (featuring Bon Iver)	2010	Kanye West	My Beautiful Dark Twisted; Fantasy	Co-writer/Co-producer	Kanye West, Manu Dibango, Justin Vernon, Gilbert Scott-Heron	Kanye West
"Eyez Closed" (featuring Kanye West & John Legend)	2011	Snoop Dogg	Doggumentary	Producer	-	Kanye West, Mike Dean
"Free" (featuring Will.i.am)	2011	Natalia Kills	Perfectionist	Co-writer/Producer	Natalia Kerry Fisher, Scott Mescudi, Ernest Wilson	No I.D.
"Zombie"	2011	Natalia Kills	Perfectionist	Co-writer/Producer	Natalia Kerry-Fisher	-
"Heaven"	2011	Natalia Kills	Perfectionist	Co-writer/Producer	Natalia Kerry-Fisher	-
"Nothing Lasts Forever" (featuring Billy Kraven)	2011	Natalia Kills	Perfectionist	Featured artist/Co-writer/Producer	Natalia Kerry-Fisher	-
"I Care"	2011	Beyoncé	4	Co-writer/Producer	Beyonce Knowles-Carter, Charles Hugo	Beyoncé
"Party" (featuring Andre 3000)	2011	Beyoncé	4	Co-writer/Co-producer	Beyonce Knowles-Carter, Kanye West, Andre Benjamin, Dexter Mills, Douglas Fresh, Richard Walters	Beyoncé, Kanye West
"Rather Die Young"	2011	Beyoncé	4	Co-writer/Producer	Beyonce Knowles-Carter, Lucas Steele	Beyoncé, Luke Steele
"Lift Off" (featuring Beyoncé)	2011	Jay-Z & Kanye West	Watch the Throne	Co-writer/Producer	Shawn Carter, Kanye West, Michael Dean, Pharrell Williams, Peter Hernandez, Henry Samuel	Kanye West, Mike Dean, Q-Tip, Pharrell Williams, Don Jazzy
"That's My Bitch"	2011	Jay-Z & Kanye West	Watch the Throne	Co-writer/Co-producer	Shawn Carter, Kanye West, Kamaal Fareed, Justin Vernon, James Brown, Bobby Byrd, Ronald Lenhoff, Jeremiah Jordan	Kanye West, Q-Tip
"The Joy" (featuring Curtis Mayfield)	2011	Jay-Z & Kanye West	Watch the Throne	Additional producer	-	Peter Rock, Kanye West, Lex Luger, Mike Dean
"We Are Young" (featuring Janelle Monáe)	2011	Fun	Some Nights	Co-writer/Producer	Nathaniel Ruess, Andrew Dost, Jack Antonoff	Jack Antonoff, Tommy D
"Some Nights (Intro)"	2012	Fun	Some Nights	Co-writer/Producer	Nathaniel Ruess, Andrew Dost, Jack Antonoff	Jack Antonoff, Tommy D
"Some Nights"	2012	Fun	Some Nights	Co-writer/Producer	Nathaniel Ruess, Andrew Dost, Jack Antonoff	Jack Antonoff
"Carry On"	2012	Fun	Some Nights	Co-writer/Producer	Nathaniel Ruess, Andrew Dost, Jack Antonoff	Jack Antonoff, Tommy D
"It Gets Better"	2012	Fun	Some Nights	Co-writer/Producer	Nathaniel Ruess, Andrew Dost, Jack Antonoff	Jack Antonoff
"Why Am I the One"	2012	Fun	Some Nights	Co-writer/Producer	Nathaniel Ruess, Andrew Dost, Jack Antonoff	Jack Antonoff, Tommy D
"All Alone"	2012	Fun	Some Nights	Co-writer/Producer	Nathaniel Ruess, Andrew Dost, Jack Antonoff	Jack Antonoff
"All Alright"	2012	Fun	Some Nights	Co-writer/Co-producer	Nathaniel Ruess, Andrew Dost, Jack Antonoff, Emile Haynie, Jake Dutton	Jack Antonoff, Emile Haynie, Jake One
"One Foot"	2012	Fun	Some Nights	Co-writer/Co-producer	Nathaniel Ruess, Andrew Dost, Jack Antonoff, Emile Haynie	Jack Antonoff, Emile Haynie
"Stars"	2012	Fun	Some Nights	Co-writer/Producer	Nathaniel Ruess, Andrew Dost, Jack Antonoff	Jack Antonoff, Tommy D
"Out on the Town"	2012	Fun	Some Nights	Co-writer	Nathaniel Ruess, Andrew Dost, Jack Antonoff, Emile Haynie	-
"Diet Mountain Dew"	2012	Lana Del Rey	Born to Die	Co-producer	-	Emile Haynie, Mike Daly
"National Anthem"	2012	Lana Del Rey	Born to Die	Additional producer	-	Emile Haynie, The Nexus
"Carmen"	2012	Lana Del Rey	Born to Die	Additional producer	-	Emile Haynie, Justin Parker
"Girl on Fire" (solo / featuring Nicki Minaj)	2012	Alicia Keys	Girl on Fire	Co-writer/Producer	Alicia Cook, Salaam Remi, Onika Maraj, William Squier	Alicia Keys, Salaam Remi
"Just Give Me a Reason" (featuring Nate Ruess)	2012	Pink	The Truth About Love	Co-writer/Producer	Alicia Moore, Nathaniel Ruess	-
"Locked Out of Heaven"	2012	Bruno Mars	Unorthodox Jukebox	Producer	-	The Smeezingtons, Emile Haynie, Mark Ronson
"Doom and Gloom"	2012	The Rolling Stones	GRRR!	Producer	-	Don Was, The Glimmer Twins, Emile Haynie
"Holy Ground"	2012	Taylor Swift	Red	Producer	-	-
"The Lucky One"	2012	Taylor Swift	Red	Producer	-	-
"Tears Always Win"	2012	Alicia Keys	Girl on Fire	Co-writer/Producer	Alicia Cook, Bruno Mars, Philip Lawrence	Alicia Keys
"Young Girls"	2012	Bruno Mars	Unorthodox Jukebox	Co-writer/Producer	Bruno Mars, Philip Lawrence, Ari Levine, Emile Haynie, Morris Davis	The Smeezingtons, Emile Haynie
"Gorilla"	2012	Bruno Mars	Unorthodox Jukebox	Producer	-	The Smeezingtons, Emile Haynie, Mark Ronson
"Moonshine"	2012	Bruno Mars	Unorthodox Jukebox	Co-writer/Producer	Bruno Mars, Philip Lawrence, Ari Levine, Andrew Wyatt, Mark Ronson	The Smeezingtons, Mark Ronson
"Let Us Move On" (featuring Kendrick Lamar)	2013	Dido	Girl Who Got Away	Co-writer	Dido Armstrong, Rowland Armstrong, Kendrick Duckworth, Patrick Reynolds	-
"Can't Stop"	2013	OneRepublic	Native	Co-writer/Producer	Ryan Tedder, Tyler Johnson	Tyler Johnson, Ryan Tedder, Emile Haynie
"Headlights" (featuring Nate Ruess)	2013	Eminem	The Marshall Mathers LP 2	Co-writer/Producer	Marshall Mathers III, Nathaniel Ruess, Emile Haynie, Luis Resto	Emile Haynie, Eminem
"Photograph"	2014	Ed Sheeran	X	Producer	-	Emile Haynie
"Tropical Chancer"	2014	La Roux	Trouble in Paradise	Co-writer	Eleanor Jackson, Ian Sherwin, Grace Jones	-
"Uptown Funk" (featuring Bruno Mars)	2014	Mark Ronson	Uptown Special	Co-writer/Producer	Mark Ronson, Bruno Mars, Philip Lawrence, Devon Gallaspy, Nicholaus Williams, Lonnie Simmons, Ronnie Wilson, Charles Wilson, Rudolph Taylor, Robert Wilson	Mark Ronson, Bruno Mars
"Uptown's First Finale" (featuring Stevie Wonder & Andrew Wyatt)	2015	Mark Ronson	Uptown Special	Co-writer/Producer	Mark Ronson, Michael Chabon	Mark Ronson, Emile Haynie
"Summer Breaking" (featuring Kevin Parker)	2015	Mark Ronson	Uptown Special	Co-writer/Producer	Mark Ronson, Michael Chabon, Kevin Parker	Mark Ronson, Emile Haynie
"Feel Right" (featuring Mystikal)	2015	Mark Ronson	Uptown Special	Producer	-	Mark Ronson, Bruno Mars, Boys Noize
"I Can't Lose" (featuring Keyone Star)	2015	Mark Ronson	Uptown Special	Co-writer/Producer	Mark Ronson, Michael Chabon	Mark Ronson, Emile Haynie, DJ Zinc, TEED
"Daffodils" (featuring Kevin Parker)	2015	Mark Ronson	Uptown Special	Producer	-	Mark Ronson, James Ford, Riton
"Crack in the Pearl" (featuring Andrew Wyatt)	2015	Mark Ronson	Uptown Special	Co-writer/Producer	Mark Ronson, Michael Chabon	Mark Ronson, Emile Haynie
"In Case of Fire" (featuring Jeff Bhasker)	2015	Mark Ronson	Uptown Special	Featured artist/Co-writer/Producer	Mark Ronson, Michael Chabon, Nicholas Movshon, Alexander Greenwald, Rufus Wainright	Mark Ronson
"Leaving Los Feliz" (featuring Kevin Parker)	2015	Mark Ronson	Uptown Special	Co-writer/Producer	Mark Ronson, Michael Chabon, Kevin Parker, Emile Haynie, Christopher Vataliro	Mark Ronson
"Heavy and Rolling" (featuring Andrew Wyatt)	2015	Mark Ronson	Uptown Special	Co-writer/Producer	Mark Ronson, Michael Chabon, Andrew Wyatt	Mark Ronson, Emile Haynie
"Crack in the Pearl Pt. II" (featuring Stevie Wonder & Jeff Bhasker)	2015	Mark Ronson	Uptown Special	Featured artist/Co-writer/Producer	Mark Ronson, Michael Chabon	Mark Ronson
"Burning House"	2015	Cam	Untamed	Co-writer/Co-producer	Camaron Ochs, Tyler Johnson	Tyler Johnson, Hamilton Ulmer
"Runaway Train"	2015	Cam	Untamed	Co-writer/Co-producer	Camaron Ochs, Anders Mouridsen	Tyler Johnson, Douglas Showalter, Anders Mouridsen
"Kiss It Better"	2016	Rihanna	Anti	Co-writer/Producer	Robyn Fenty, Jonathan Glass, Natalia Kerry-Fisher	John Glass, Kuk Harrell
"Gone Tomorrow (Here Today)"	2016	Keith Urban	Ripcord	Co-writer/Producer	Keith Urban, Tyler Johnson	Keith Urban, Tyler Johnson
"Diamond Heart"	2016	Lady Gaga	Joanne	Co-Producer	-	Mark Ronson, Lady Gaga, BloodPop, Josh Homme
"Calling All My Lovelies"	2016	Bruno Mars	24K Magic	Co-writer/Producer	Bruno Mars, Philip Lawrence, Christopher Brody Brown, James Fauntleroy, Emile Haynie	Shampoo Press & Curl, Emile Haynie
"Too Good to Say Goodbye"	2016	Bruno Mars	24K Magic	Co-writer	Bruno Mars, Philip Lawrence, Christopher Brody Brown, Kenneth Edmonds	Shampoo Press & Curl
"Sign of the Times"	2017	Harry Styles	Harry Styles	Co-writer/Producer	Harry Styles, Mitch Rowland, Ryan Nasci, Alexander Salibian, Tyler Johnson	Alex Salibian, Tyler Johnson
"Meet Me in the Hallway"	2017	Harry Styles	Harry Styles	Co-writer/Producer	Harry Styles, Mitch Rowland, Ryan Nasci, Alexander Salibian, Tyler Johnson	Alex Salibian, Tyler Johnson
"Carolina"	2017	Harry Styles	Harry Styles	Co-writer/Producer	Harry Styles, Thomas Hull, Mitch Rowland, Ryan Nasci, Alexander Salibian, Tyler Johnson	Kid Harpoon, Alex Salibian, Tyler Johnson
"Two Ghosts"	2017	Harry Styles	Harry Styles	Producer	-	Alex Salibian, Tyler Johnson
"Sweet Creature"	2017	Harry Styles	Harry Styles	Additional producer	-	Kid Harpoon, Alex Salibian, Tyler Johnson
"Only Angel"	2017	Harry Styles	Harry Styles	Co-writer/Producer	Harry Styles, Mitch Rowland, Ryan Nasci, Alexander Salibian, Tyler Johnson	Alex Salibian, Tyler Johnson
"Kiwi"	2017	Harry Styles	Harry Styles	Co-writer/Producer	Harry Styles, Mitch Rowland, Ryan Nasci, Alexander Salibian, Tyler Johnson	Alex Salibian, Tyler Johnson
"Ever Since New York"	2017	Harry Styles	Harry Styles	Co-writer/Producer	Harry Styles, Mitch Rowland, Ryan Nasci, Alexander Salibian, Tyler Johnson	Alex Salibian, Tyler Johnson
"Woman"	2017	Harry Styles	Harry Styles	Co-writer/Producer	Harry Styles, Mitch Rowland, Ryan Nasci, Alexander Salibian, Tyler Johnson	Alex Salibian, Tyler Johnson
"From the Dining Table"	2017	Harry Styles	Harry Styles	Co-writer/Producer	Harry Styles, Mitch Rowland, Ryan Nasci, Alexander Salibian, Tyler Johnson	Alex Salibian, Tyler Johnson
"Pendulum"	2017	Katy Perry	Witness	Co-writer/Producer	Katheryn Hudson, Sarah Hudson	Illangelo, Mailbox
"Told You So"	2017	Miguel	War & Leisure	Co-writer/Producer	Miguel Pimental, Nathan Perez	Miguel, Happy Perez
"Deep End"	2018	Lykke Li	So Sad So Sexy	Co-writer/Producer	Li Zachrisson, Ilsey Juber, Tyler Williams, Stephen Kozmeniuk, James Ryan Ho	T-Minus, Malay
"Two Nights" (featuring Aminé)	2018	Lykke Li	So Sad So Sexy	Co-writer/Producer	Li Zachrisson, Ilsey Juber, Jonathan Coffer, James Ryan Ho, Adam Daniel	Malay, Jonny Coffer, Skrillex
"Jaguars in the Air"	2018	Lykke Li	So Sad So Sexy	Co-writer/Producer	Li Zachrisson, Ilsey Juber, Tyler Williams, James Ryan Ho	T-Minus, Malay
"So Sad So Sexy"	2018	Lykke Li	So Sad So Sexy	Co-writer/Producer	Li Zachrisson, Andrew Wyatt, Emile Haynie, Ilsey Juber, James Ryan Ho	Emile Haynie, Malay
"Freeee (Ghost Town, Pt. 2)"	2018	Kids See Ghosts	Kids See Ghosts	Co-writer/Producer	Kanye West, Kid Cudi, Ty Dolla Sign, Mike Dean, Corin Littler	Kanye West, Kid Cudi, Mike Dean, BoogzDaBeast, Andrew Dawson, Andy C, Russell "Love" Crews
"Come Alive"	2019	Madonna	Madame X	Co-writer/Co-producer	Madonna, Brittany Hazzard	Madonna, Mike Dean
"Looking for Mercy"	2019	Madonna	Madame X	Co-producer	-	Madonna, Mike Dean
"Back That Up to the Beat"	2019	Madonna	Madame X	Co-producer	-	Madonna, Mike Dean, Pharrell Williams
"Take Me to the Light"	2019	Francis and the Lights	Take Me to the Light	Co-writer/Producer	BJ Burton, Benny Blanco, Caroline Shaw, Francis Farewell Starlite, Justin Vernon, Kanye West, Cashmere Cat, Noah Goldstein	Kanye West, BJ Burton, Benny Blanco, Cashmere Cat, Noah Goldstein, Francis Farewell Starlite
"Future Nostalgia"	2019	Dua Lipa	Future Nostalgia	Co-writer/Co-producer	Dua Lipa, Clarence Coffee Jr.	Skylar Mones
"Cherry"	2019	Harry Styles	Fine Line	Co-writer	Harry Styles, Sammy Witte, Thomas Hull, Tyler Johnson	-
"She"	2019	Harry Styles	Fine Line	Co-writer	Harry Styles, Mitch Rowland, Thomas Hull	-
"Treat People with Kindness"	2019	Harry Styles	Fine Line	Co-writer/Producer	Harry Styles, Ilsey Juber	-
"High Road"	2020	Kesha	High Road	Co-writer/Producer	K. Sebert, Nate Ruess, Wrabel	Skyler Mones
"Chasing Thunder"	2020	Kesha	High Road	Co-writer/Producer	K. Sebert, Wrabel, Louis Schoorl	Schoorl
"Come to Life"	2021	Kanye West	Donda	Co-writer/Producer	Kanye West, Antony Williams, Warren Campbell, Jr., Raul Cubina, Mark Williams, Michael Dean	Kanye West, Warren Campbell, Jr., Ojivolta, Michael Dean
"Holy Ground (Taylor's Version)"	2021	Taylor Swift	Red (Taylor's Version)	Producer	-	-
"The Lucky One (Taylor's Version)"	2021	Taylor Swift	Red (Taylor's Version)	Producer	-	-
"Childlike Things"	2024	FKA Twigs	Eusexua	Co-writer	Mike Chapman, North West, Lewis Roberts, Mark Williams, Raul Cubina, Xquisite Korpse, Marius de Vries, Simon Pilton	-

== Awards and nominations ==
=== Grammy Awards ===
Selected awards
Year	Nominated work	Primary artist	Category	Results	Notes
2009	"Swagga Like Us"	Jay-Z	Best Rap Song	Nominated	
2010	"Run This Town"	Jay-Z	Best Rap Song	Won	
2012	"All of the Lights"	Kanye West	Best Rap Song	Won	
2012	"All of the Lights"	Kanye West	Song of the Year	Nominated	
2013	"We Are Young"	Fun	Song of the Year	Won	
2013	"We Are Young"	Fun	Record of the Year	Nominated	
2013	Some Nights	Fun	Album of the Year	Nominated	
2013	Himself		Producer of the Year, Non-Classical	Nominated	
2014	"Locked Out of Heaven"	Bruno Mars	Record of the Year	Nominated	
2014	"Just Give Me a Reason"	Pink	Song of the Year	Nominated	
2014	Red	Taylor Swift	Album of the Year	Nominated	
2015	x	Ed Sheeran	Album of the Year	Nominated	
2016	"Uptown Funk"	Mark Ronson	Record of the Year	Won	
2016	Himself		Producer of the Year, Non-Classical	Won	
2017	"Kiss It Better"	Rihanna	Best R&B Song	Nominated	
2022	Donda	Kanye West	Album of the Year	Nominated	

== Filmography ==
- A Man Named Scott (2021) – Himself
