= Eisenhower Crossing =

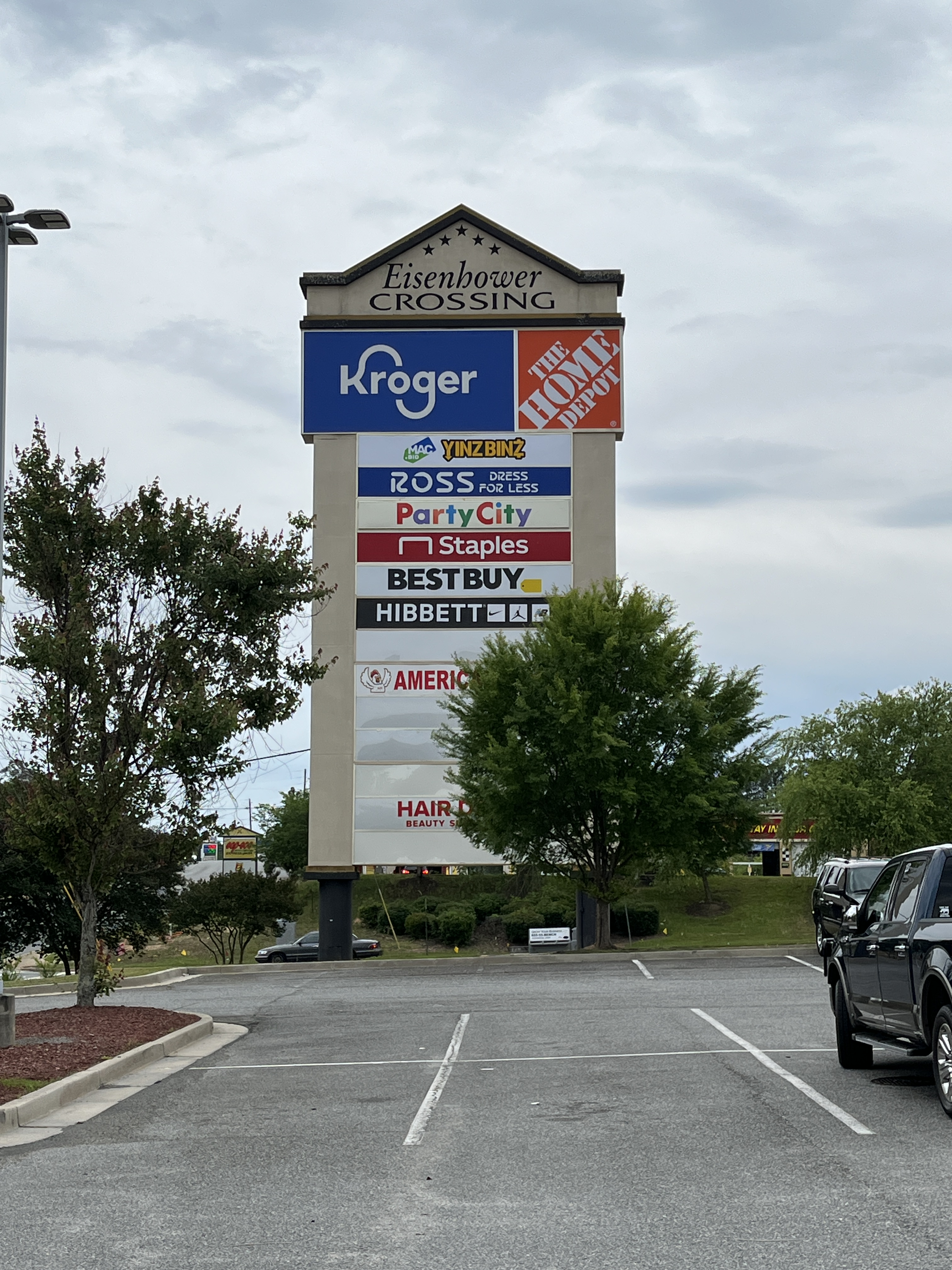
- Eisenhower Crossing sign facing Log Cabin Dr, pictured in 2026
- Address: Presidential Pkwy, Macon, GA
- Opened: 2001
- Num. of stores: 30 (52 at peak)

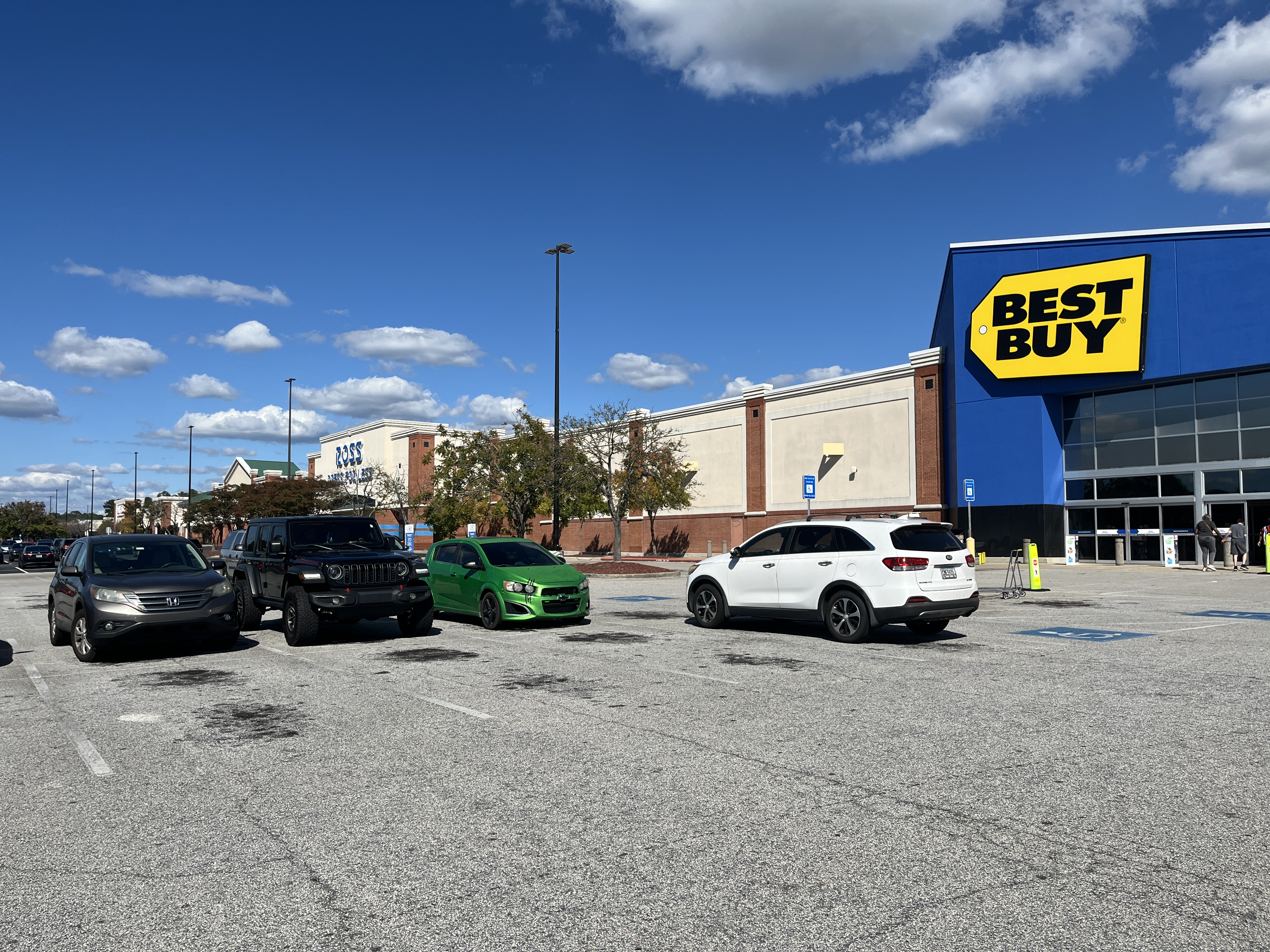
Eisenhower Crossing's east wing, which contains Staples, Kroger, Ross, and Best Buy

Eisenhower Crossing is a power center in Macon, Georgia. It is anchored by Kroger, Staples, Ross, Best Buy, Home Depot, Hair Depot, Legends Fitness, and YinzBinz.

== History ==
=== Initial rise (2001–2004) ===
Eisenhower Crossing opened in 2001, with the first anchor being Marshalls, which opened in July 2001. Target, Bed Bath & Beyond, Goody's, Famous Footwear Old Navy, Dick's Sporting Goods, Staples, LifeWay, Party City, Michaels, and Best Buy would all open later that year. Kroger and Ross opened in early 2002. In addition to these big-box retailers, several smaller stores were added, including Fashion Bug, Bath & Body Works, GNC, Payless Shoe Source, and more, many of which were duplicate stores from the Macon Mall.

=== Expansion (2005–2006) ===
A Home Depot was added in 2005, relocating from Westgate Mall. Eisenhower II was added in 2006, adding in a PetSmart, and an hhgregg. Shoe Carnival also replaced the vacant Famous Footwear in 2006.

=== Early closures (2009–2017) ===
Goody's closed in 2009, due to the company going bankrupt. In 2010, Ashley HomeStore replaced the vacant Goody's. In 2014, Dick's Sporting Goods closed their location at Eisenhower Crossing. hhgregg would later close in 2017, due to the company going bankrupt. As of June 2015, 30% of the Eisenhower corridor's retail space was vacant.

=== Target's closure and decline (2017–2023) ===
In late 2017, Target announced they would be closing their Eisenhower Crossing location. The store closed in February 2018. In late 2018, plans were underway for Aspire Fitness to open in the vacant hhgregg, but the gym would never open. A new shopping center called North Macon Plaza was announced in late 2018, featuring many retailers existing in Eisenhower Crossing, including Old Navy, Michaels, Marshalls, and LifeWay. However, due to the company going bankrupt, LifeWay would never open in the new shopping center, and would close at Eisenhower Crossing in 2019. The new Marshalls would open in September 2019, leaving the old Eisenhower Crossing store to close. PetSmart announced their closure later that month, and Old Navy announced that they would keep their Eisenhower Crossing store open. Michaels would open their new North Macon store in early 2020, causing the Eisenhower Crossing location to close. A new gym called Legends Fitness opened in the former hhgregg in October 2020. In December 2020, Bed Bath & Beyond closed as well. Old Navy would also close around this time. In late 2021, Ashley HomeStore relocated near The Shoppes at River Crossing. In September 2023, the former Target was demolished. Around this time, Spirit Halloween would open in the former Marshalls space temporarily.

=== Post-decline (2023-present) ===
In December 2023, Dick's Sporting Goods returned to Eisenhower Crossing with a "warehouse sale" store. In 2024, a beauty supply store called Hair Depot opened in the former PetSmart space. Shoe Carnival would close in June 2024. Spirit Halloween returned to Eisenhower Crossing this year. In December 2024, it was announced that the Party City would be closing. Party City closed in 2025. The Dick's Warehouse Sale store closed in May 2025. MAC.BID's YinzBinz opened in the former Marshalls space in 2025, with Spirit Halloween returning where Old Navy once was. Hibbett opened a location at Eisenhower Crossing in 2026.
