= Scotch & Soda (clothing) =

Dutch fashion retail company

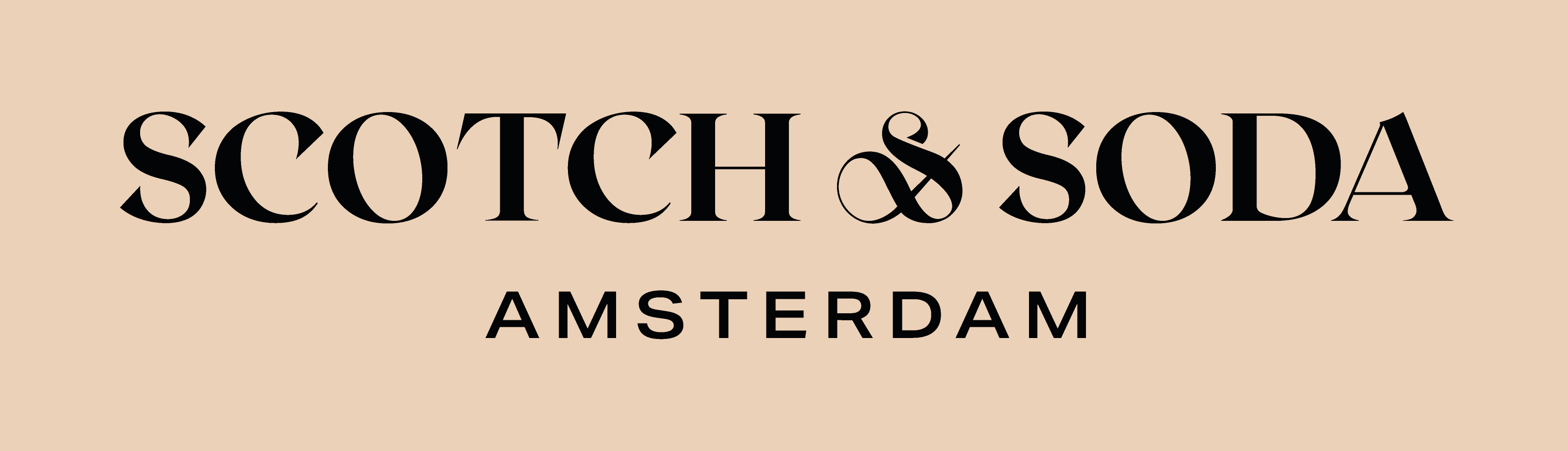
- Type: Private
- Industry: Design, distribution and sales of clothing and accessories
- Founded: 1985; 41 years ago
- Founder: Laurent Hompes
- Headquarters: Amsterdam and Hoofddorp, Netherlands
- Area served: Europe, Oceania, North America, Asia, Middle East, Africa
- Key people: Thomas Bervoets (CEO); Suzanne Smit (CFO)
- Products: Apparel; Accessories
- Owner: Independent (1987–2011); Kellwood (2011–23); Sun Capital Partners (2011–23); Bluestar Alliance (2023–present)
- Website: scotchandsoda.com

Scotch & Soda, sometimes branded as Scotch & Soda Amsterdam, is a Dutch luxury designer fashion retail company founded in 1985 by Laurent Hompes and currently owned by the brand management firm Bluestar Alliance.

== History ==
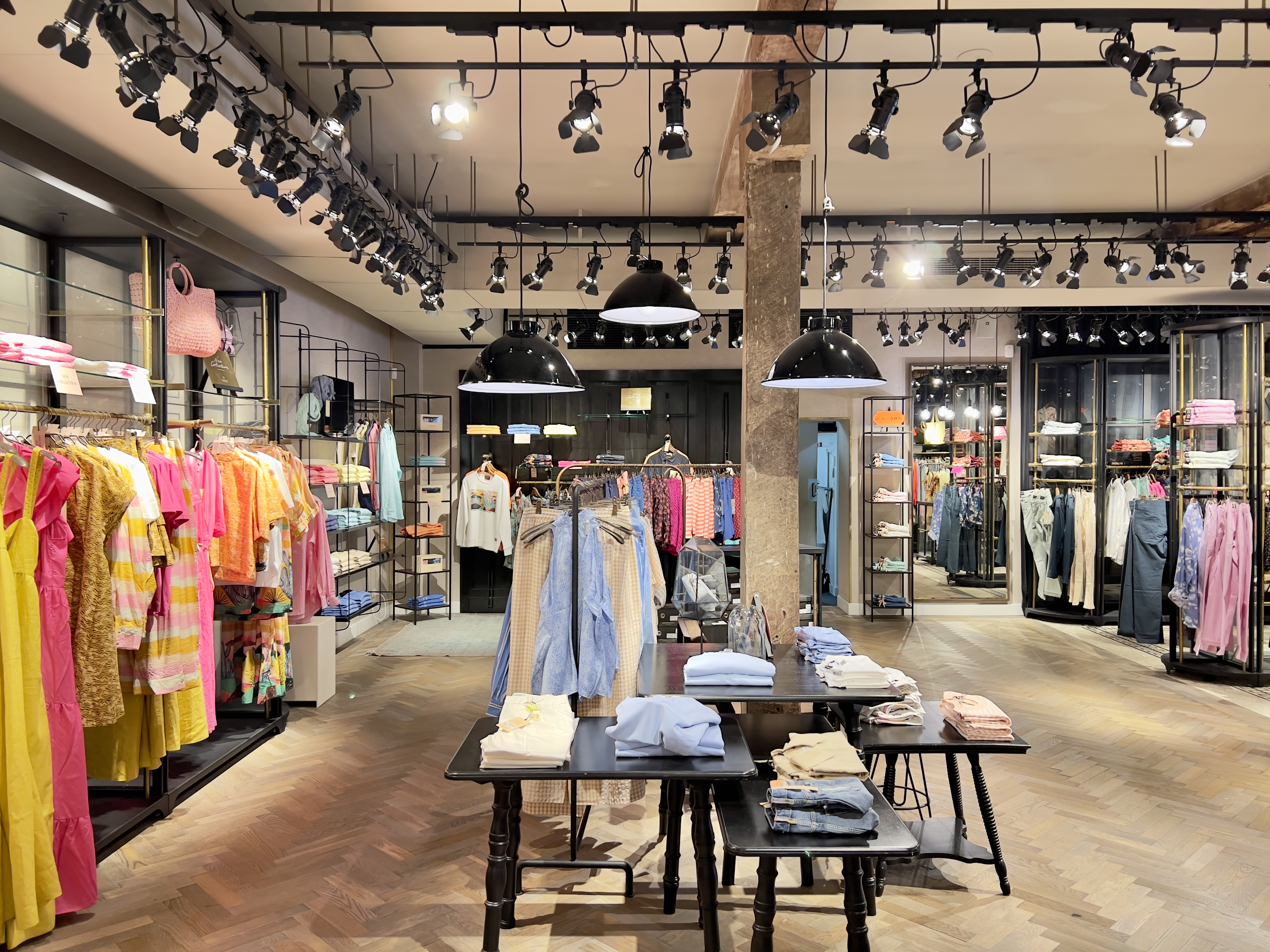
Interior of a Scotch & Soda store in Brisbane, Australia (2022).

=== Origins ===
Founded as a menswear label in the 1980s, Scotch & Soda had become an international brand by the time it was sold in 2011 to Kellwood and Sun Capital Partners.The brand was sold at over 7,000 shops worldwide, and operated 30 company-owned and franchised retail stores.

=== Expansion ===
In January 2020, four months after Frederick Lukoff was named CEO, the company launched sunglasses and eye glasses ranges for men and women. Until then sold in 8,000 stores and 250 branded stores, it announced the launch of its third perfume, Island Water, in May of the same year.

On March 16, 2021, Scotch & Soda announced the acceleration of its global expansion, with the opening of 15 brick-and-mortar stores and 12 shop-in-shops over the next six months. In addition, the company announced the launch of its new brand identity.

After opening 16 new stores between October 2021 and April 2022, the company planned at the time to open 20 more stores in the next six months - including flagship stores in London and Milan. Seven other shops were planned in major cities outside Europe. In June 2022, Scotch & Soda opened its flagship store on the Via Alessandro Manzoni in Milan. At the time, the company planned to open another nine stores in shops in the high end retail chain La Rinascente.

In 2023, Joe Jonas became the brand's first "ambassador". He was appointed to lead in designing a new collection capsule to be launched in Fall 2024.

=== Bankruptcy ===
On 11 May 2023, brand management firm Bluestar Alliance, which also owns Bebe Stores, Hurley International, Justice and Brookstone, completed the acquisition of the company. A week before the Bluestar Alliance agreed to acquire it for an undisclosed sum, Scotch & Soda filed for bankruptcy in the Netherlands on 20 March 2023.

In June 2024, Scotch & Soda Europe also filed for bankruptcy, blaming continual losses as a result. The company planned to keep its stores open for the time being. However in August 2024, Scotch & Soda Germany also filed for bankruptcy and announced to close all of their 40 stores within the same week.

=== Re-Opening ===
In June 2024, Scotch & Soda relaunched online in Europe with a new e-commerce operator, United Legwear and Apparel.
