= Nike Blazer =

Third shoe released by Nike

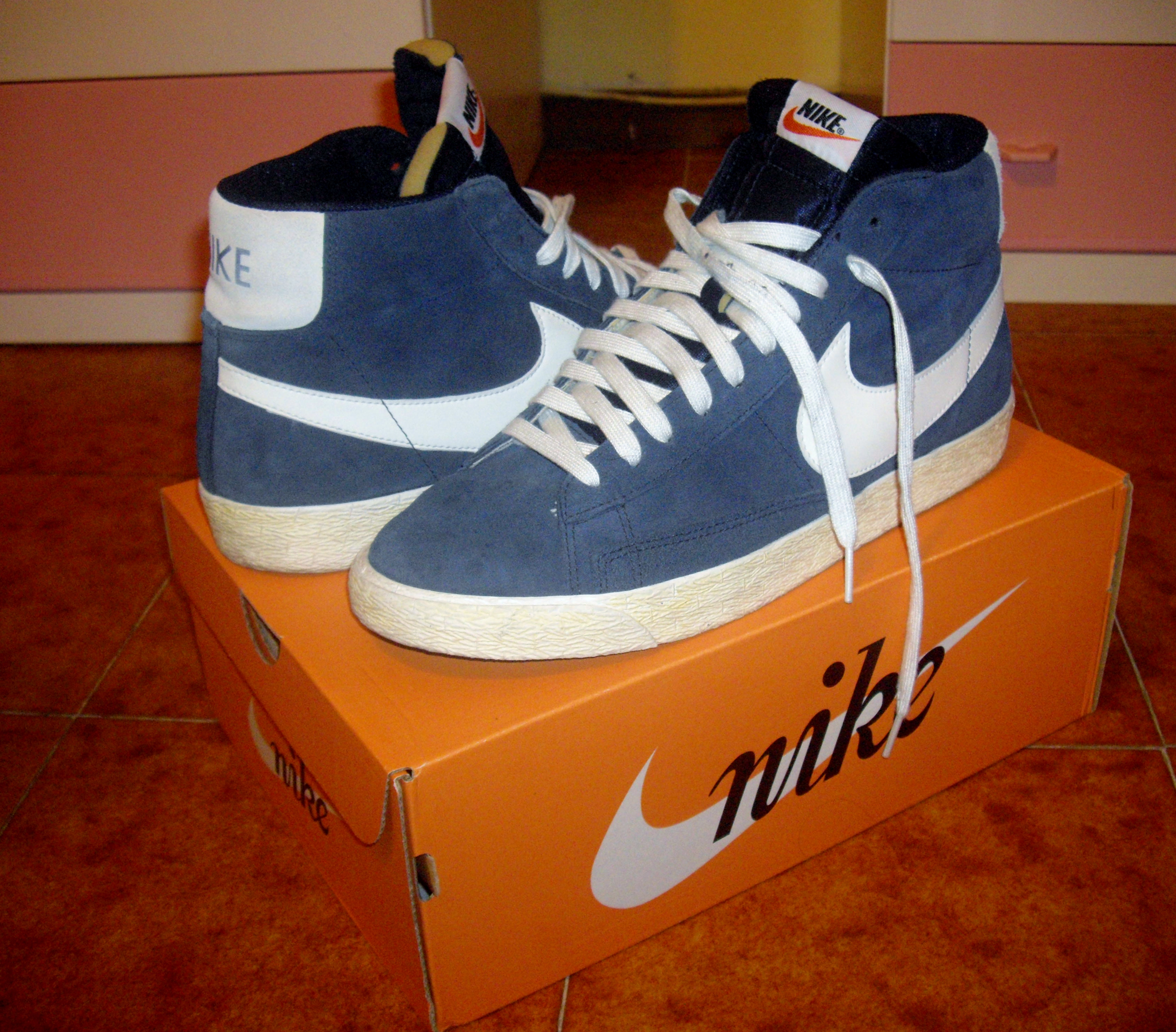
- 2012 version of the Blazer
- Type: Sneakers
- Inventor: Nike, Inc.
- Inception: 1973; 53 years ago
- Manufacturer: Nike
- Website: nike.com/blazers-shoes

Nike Blazer is a sneaker manufactured by Nike. It was originally released in 1973 as a basketball shoe.

The Beaverton, Oregon-based brand named the design “Blazer” after its regional NBA team, the Portland Trail Blazers. The original shoe was made out of three main components: a leather upper portion, nylon tongue, and a rubber midsole.

== History ==
The Blazer was originally worn by NBA star George "The Iceman" Gervin. Gervin was the first athlete to receive an exclusive shoe from Nike. The Beaverton, Oregon-based brand named the design “Blazer” after its regional NBA team, the Portland Trail Blazers. The original shoe was made out of three main components: a leather upper portion, nylon tongue, and a rubber midsole.

Other sneaker manufacturers were developing their own basketball sneakers and basketball stars to market them. Competing collaborations included Julius Erving with Converse and Walt Frazier with Puma. Nike, then known as Blue Ribbon Sports, rebranded in 1971. The company was smaller and was competing with larger industry players via technology that was cutting-edge for basketball shoes at the time. The Nike Blazer is still available in low-top and mid-top.

== Models ==
=== SB Blazer ===
Although the Nike Blazer was created for basketball, it has become a part of the Nike Skateboarding (SB) sub-brand and is marketed towards the skateboarding community.

In 2005, skateboarder Lance Mountain released the Nike Blazer SB, which was a design with new features such as a padded collar and insoles where Nike implemented their Zoom Air technology to accommodate skaters. The first Nike Blazer SB had a dark look with an all-black suede upper and a black midsole that was made thicker than in the original basketball shoe; the swoosh and laces were a baroque brown.

== Collaborations ==
The Nike Blazer has remained relevant in sneaker culture. This could be directly attributed to the numerous collaborations Nike has done with other clothing brands to create new Blazer colorways.

=== Nike Blazer x Stussy ===
In 2002, Nike and Stüssy teamed up to release two Blazer colorways. One came in navy blue with a pink Nike swoosh, while the other was wolf grey with an emerald green swoosh.

In 2008, the two companies released three new colorways of the Nike Blazer as a part of Stussy's Neighborhood Boneyard collection. This particular version of the Blazer featured a checkerboard on the upper portion of the shoe, which came in blue, red, and white versions.

=== Nike Blazer x Supreme ===
In April 2006, Nike and Supreme released three colorways of the Nike Blazer SB as the Blazer was being transformed into a skateboarding shoe: "Varsity Red", "Sail", and "Black".

=== Nike Blazer x Off-White ===
In September 2017, luxury fashion brand Off-White and Nike collaborated on "The Ten" Nike Blazer. This shoe has a white upper, a white and tan midsole, and a black swoosh. The following year, Nike teamed up with Off-White and Serena Williams to create the "Queen". This shoe has a wolf grey upper, while the heel and tongue are white. Its mid-sole is pink and purple with a fade effect and a black swoosh.

In October 2018, Nike and Off-White teamed up to create two new Nike Blazer shoes. The "All Hollows Eve" consists of a pale vanilla upper, while the swoosh is in bright yellow-orange. The "Grim Reaper" consists of a 'clone black' upper with a black midsole and upper toe, orange accents, and a white swoosh.

=== Nike Blazer x Sacai ===
In May 2019, Japanese luxury brand Sacai and Nike collaborated on the "Black Blue" and "Maize Navy" colorways of the Nike Blazer. In October, the two brands released the "White Grey" and "Black Grey" colorways.

=== Nike Blazer x Stranger Things ===
In June 2019, Netflix teamed up with Nike to create the "Hawkins High" colorway of the Nike Blazer, which was inspired by the streaming series Stranger Things. The shoe was part of a three-sneaker collection that included the Nike Cortez and Tailwind. This sneaker has a very retro look, which suits the show's story line. It features an all white leather upper with a bright orange swoosh, white laces, and a white midsole. The entire shoe is highlighted by green accents on the tongue and heel.

In July 2019, the two released another three-sneaker collection, this one featured the "OG Collection" Nike Blazer. This sneaker features an all royal blue suede upper that is accented by a white leather swoosh that complements the white mid-sole and heel.

A three-sneaker collection in August 2019 included the "Upside Down" Blazer. This sneaker is made up of a light tan mesh/canvas upper and features a swoosh of the same color and material, making it hard to notice from afar. The shoe does feature a white midsole to match the white laces.

== See also ==
- List of basketball shoe brands
