= Reese Cooper =

American fashion designer

- Born: November 1998 (age 27); Jacksonville, Florida
- Occupation: Fashion Designer
- Website: official website

Reese Cooper is a fashion designer born in Jacksonville, Florida. He launched his eponymous brand in 2016 without training or attending fashion school. In 2019 he was a finalist for the CFDA Vogue Fashion fund. He debuted his first full collection in 2018 at Paris Fashion Week.

== Early life and design inspirations ==
Reese Cooper was born in Jacksonville, Florida, and raised in Atlanta, before moving to London at age 11.

Cooper's interest in design and creativity started from a young age. When speaking with Esquire, he cited schooling and his family as impacting the way he viewed creativity; "I knew I wanted to make stuff. I didn't know it would be clothes, but in the regular education system you're not really taught that you can just go make stuff regardless of what it is. I always had a fascination with how things are made through spending a lot of time with my grandfather when I was younger. He made everything that they need at the house.”

As for other inspirations and brands he admires, Cooper also cites Ralph Lauren as one of his favourite brands due to the expansive universe that the brand has created. He has also said that "early Off-White" by the late Virgil Abloh was "incredibly inspiring" to him at a young age.
