= Macon Mall =

Coordinates: 32.81692°N 83.69432°W

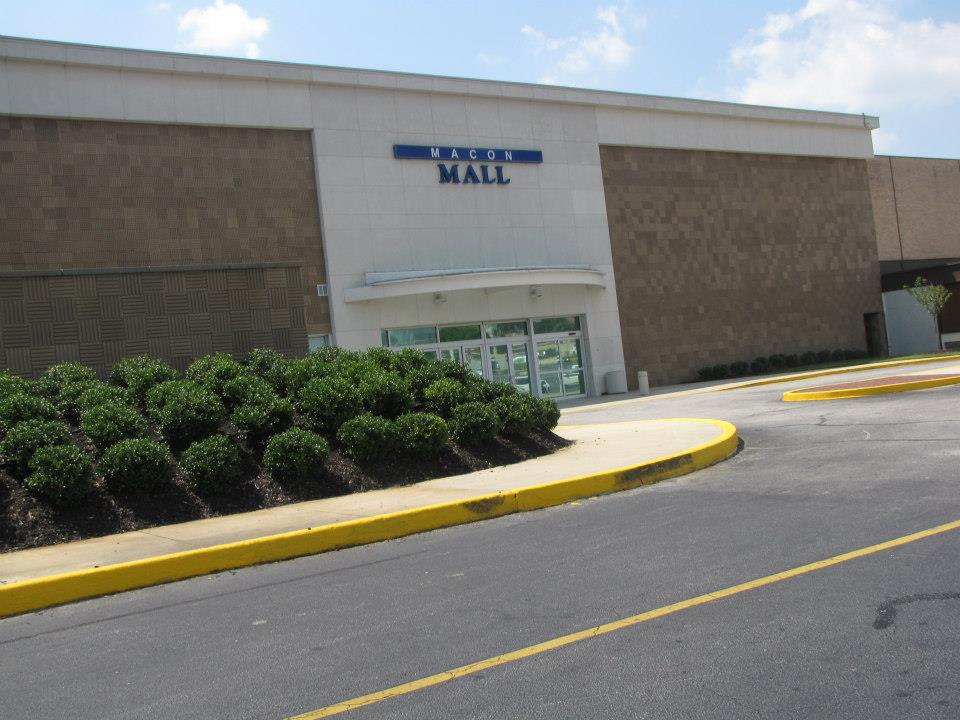
- Macon Mall entrance facing Mercer University Drive.
- Location: Macon, Georgia, United States
- Opened: July 30th, 1975
- Developer: Colonial Properties
- Manager: Hull Property Group
- Owner: Hull Property Group
- Architect: Architectonics, Inc.
- Num. of stores: 15 (150 at peak)
- Num. of anchor tenants: 1 (6 at peak)
- Floor area: 1,080,000 sq ft (100,000 m^{2}).
- Floors: 2
- Website: www.maconmall.com

Macon Mall is a two-level, 1.1-million-square-foot (100,000 m^{2}) shopping mall located in Macon, Georgia. It is a dead mall with a vacancy rate over 70% with only one anchor store, Burlington.

== History ==
=== Early history (1975–1986) ===
Macon Mall was announced in 1973, architect was Architectonics, Inc. of Dallas. The mall opened in 1975 as a 1.08-million-square-foot (100,000 m^{2}) shopping mall anchored by Davison's, Belk, JCPenney, and Sears. A Woolworth was added later which went bankrupt. The opening of Macon Mall led to the demise of Georgia's first enclosed mall, Westgate Mall down the street. At opening date the mall was filled with hundreds of light bulbs in a disco-style theme. This appearance quickly became dated and expensive to maintain, leading to the mall's first renovation in 1983. The food court was added in 1986 and Davison's changed over to Macy's, when Macy's decided to rename all of their stores at the time under the same name.

=== Renovation and expansion (1997) ===
For 14 years Macon Mall was one of the largest malls in the state of Georgia, encompassing 1,448,200 square feet (134,540 m^{2}). The mall underwent a huge renovation and expansion in 1997 that nearly doubled the size of the mall and added Dillard's and Parisian as anchors. This made the mall more upscale and added 40+ new stores. This expansion made Macon Mall the largest mall in the state of Georgia for two years until Mall of Georgia opened in 1999 in Gwinnett County. Two parking garages were constructed on the new wing to handle the increase in business and decrease in parking. An extra level was also added to the food court that brought in Atlanta Bread Company, Sbarro, and Time Out Arcade. Macy's changed over to Rich's in 1998. In the years following the expansion, Macon Mall ran a monopoly on regional retail. A new power center named Eisenhower Crossing opened down the street in 2001 and took Old Navy from the mall. Federated integrated Macy's into Rich's as Rich's-Macy's in 2003, and in 2005 announced they were eliminating all of their regional names in favor of Macy's in 2005. This resulted in Rich's at Macon Mall changing back to Macy's. Belk also dropped the "Matthews" name from their store and Steve & Barry's opened a large store on the upper level of the Sears wing in 2005.

=== Beginning of the decline (2008) ===
Parisian was bought by Belk in 2006 and was closed in 2007. The mall entered foreclosure in 2008, and put under the operation of Jones Lang LaSalle. In 2008, The Shoppes at River Crossing, a new lifestyle center, opened in North Bibb County and took Dillard's from Macon Mall. Dillard's stated they could better serve the market with one store, but their departure was speculated to be because of the mall's debt issues. With Dillard's gone, this leaves the two anchor stores added to the mall in 1997 vacant, and the mall performance began to deteriorate rapidly. This in turn created a ripple effect and many tenants began leave the mall in 2009, such as Abercrombie & Fitch, Ann Taylor Loft, Eddie Bauer, Hollister Co., The Gap, Charlotte Russe, GameStop, New York & Company, f.y.e., The Limited, Lane Bryant, Wolf Camera, Wet Seal, LensCrafters, Starbucks, and Ruby Tuesday. Some of these stores moved to The Shoppes at River Crossing, many left the Macon area entirely, and some closed due to corporate bankruptcies: Steve & Barry's, B. Dalton, Linens N Things, and KB Toys. The Movie Tavern that was supposed to open in 2009, in the former Parisian building, never did due to the mall's financial issues. The upper level of the food court has been abandoned. This exodus of retailers is a direct result of Dillard's vacancy, new competition, poor location, and the weakened economy. In 2009, Macon Mall introduced Art Space. This is the second art space concept in a mall in the U.S. The first is Crestwood Court outside of St. Louis.

=== Renovation and demolition (2011) ===
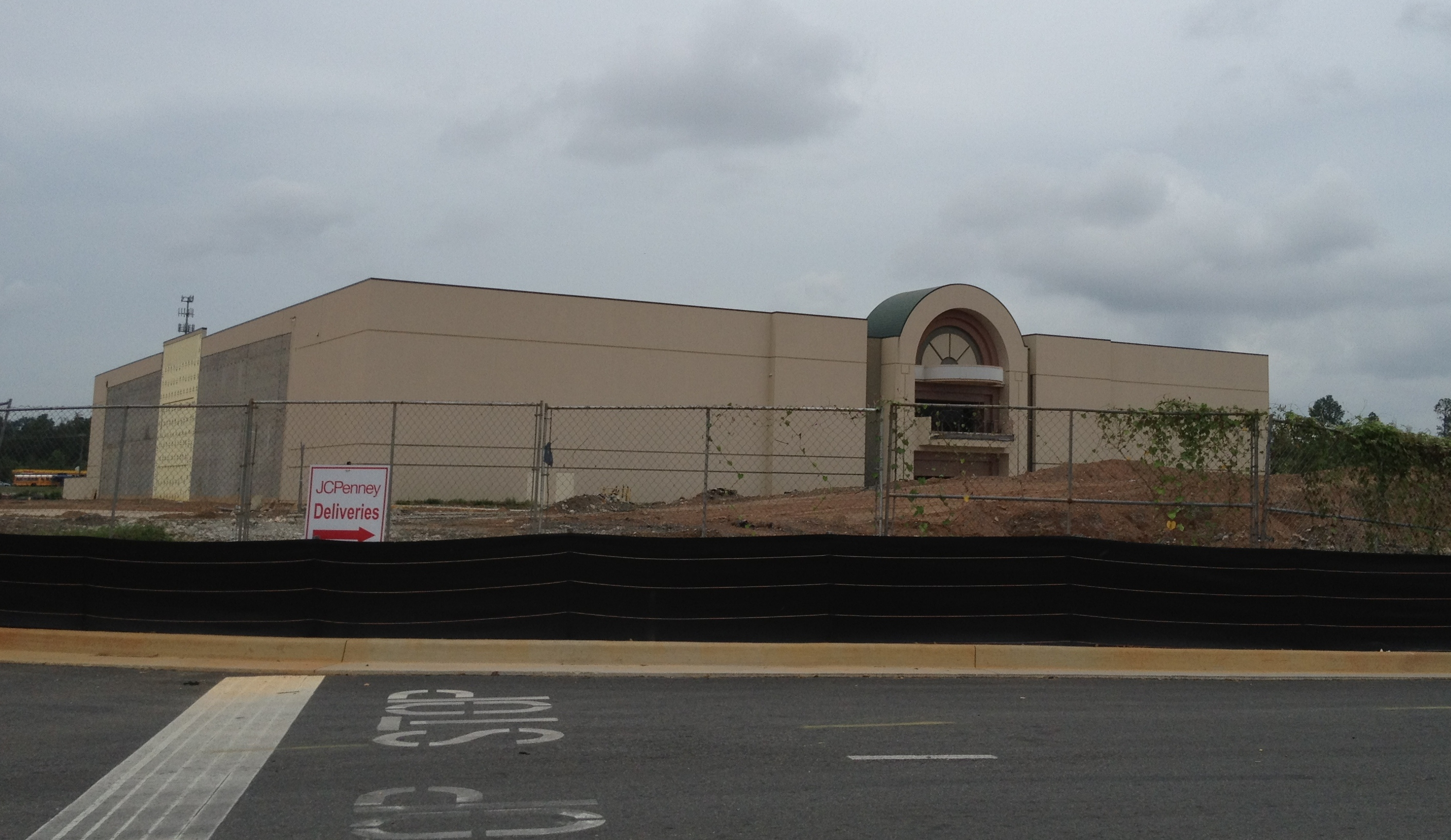
The former Dillards remaining in August 2012 after demolition of the East Wing and former Parisian

The mall continued to leak in-line tenants in 2010 including Express, Yankee Candle, Hot Topic, Chick-fil-A, and Subway. In September 2010, the mall was acquired by Hull Storey Gibson of Augusta, Georgia. They planned to demolish the east wing of the mall beginning with the vacant Parisian building. The original and remaining portion of the mall, was renovated. The Art Space tenants in the 1997 addition were asked to vacate, while the remaining tenants were asked to move to the west wing. While many did (Rue 21, Finish Line, Spencer's) just to name a few, there were some who left the mall including American Eagle Outfitters, Victoria's Secret, and Sunglass Hut. Demolition began on August 15, 2011. Once demolition was complete, North Point Mall in Alpharetta outside Atlanta relinquished Macon Mall as 4th largest mall in Georgia. Macon Mall also signed off with a new restaurant called Smok’n Pig which is the largest tenant to sign with the mall. This restaurant is 15,000 square feet (1,400 m^{2}) and takes up at least 7 stores including the former Baskin-Robbins which is located on the Sears wing of the mall which has the most vacancies. The Renovation was revealed on November 18 and 19 in a two-day celebration. Notable changes included the whole mall being carpeted, new skylights and ceilings, new restrooms, removal of the carousel, and the moving of staircases. They did not demolish the former Dillard's building. Demolition was completed by the end of 2011. On December 29, 2011, Sears announced that they would close the store at the Macon Mall due to a decline in sales at both Kmart and Sears stores nationwide. Sears' last day was Sunday, April 29, 2012. Belk closed its doors on Saturday, September 15, 2012, having opened a location at The Shoppes at River Crossing. For the next two years, vacancies steadily increased with stores like The Children's Place, RadioShack, Kirkland's, Ashley Stewart, Aéropostale, and Justice (formerly Limited Too) leaving the mall. Despite these closures, two stores opened in 2012: B. Turner's and Dry Falls Outfitters.

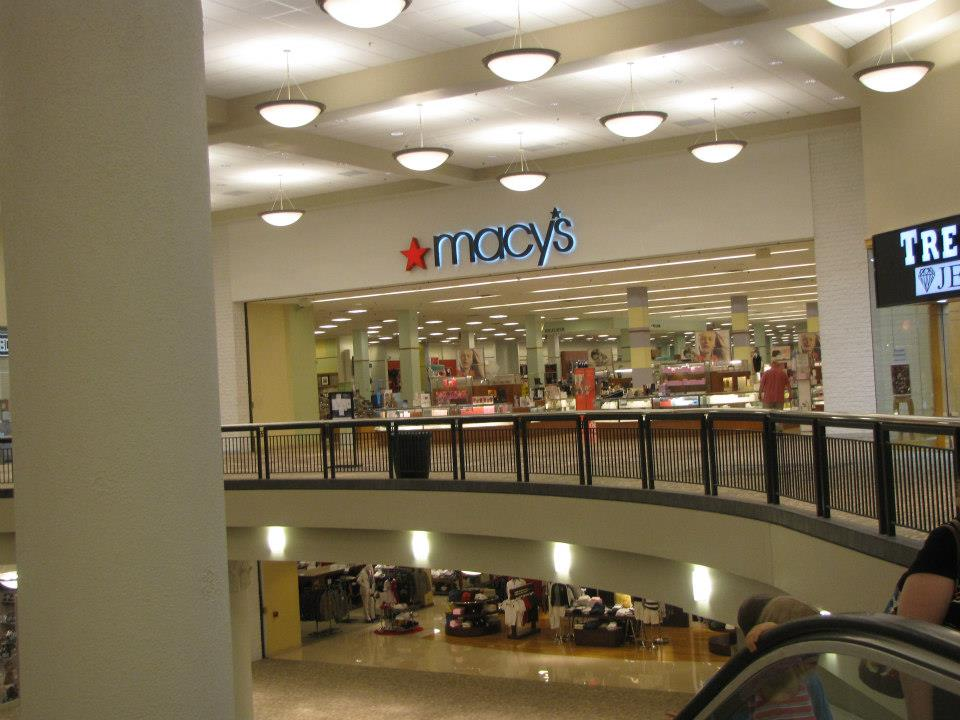
Macy's interior entrance of the Macon Mall in Macon GA

=== Continued decline (2012–2021) ===
Burlington Coat Factory confirmed that it would move into the upper level of the former Sears in 2015. In October 2015, Burlington Coat Factory opened in the top level of the former Sears as Burlington. On Friday, March 17, 2017, JCPenney announced that its store would be closing as part of a plan to close 138 stores nationwide. The store closed on Monday, July 31, 2017. Meanwhile, as of 2018 vacancies continue to increase with stores like Marks & Morgan Jewelers and Men's Wearhouse & Tux, closing as well as the food court steadily emptying out. Several stores would also close in 2019, including Foot Locker and FootAction, which left for a nearby shopping center called Summit at the Mall. On January 6, 2020, it was announced that Macy's would be closing in March 2020 as part of a plan to close 125 stores nationwide which would leave Burlington as the only anchor store left.

=== Redevelopment (2021-present) ===
On Wednesday, September 15, 2021, Macon-Bibb County announced that Hull Property Group had donated the mall to them and Mayor Lester Miller announced a $100 million investment to redevelop the mall and add a new amphitheater. With this redevelopment, city officials are hoping this will result in new businesses coming to the Eisenhower Parkway corridor. The amphitheater will have seating for up to 10,000 and the mall will include new businesses, office space for the county, space for Central Georgia Technical College and Middle Georgia State University as well as space for the film industry. Plans are also in place to create the world's largest Pickleball facility in the area. Since the announcement of the redevelopment, several retailers have expressed interest in nearby shopping centers and the city announced plans for a Casino hotel as well as a new restaurant plaza called "Mac-Town". The Atrium-Health Amphitheater opened in 2024. Rhythm & Rally, the world's largest pickleball facility, opened in the former Belk space as well. Throughout the mid 2020s, several retailers would leave the Macon Mall, including Rue 21, Spencer's, and Shoe Dept. Encore, along with Champs Sports and Authentiks, which located to the nearby Summit at the Mall shopping center. A majority of the Sears/Burlington wing of the mall was converted into government offices, including turning the lower level of the Burlington building into a courthouse and board of elections. A library was added in the former Anna's Linens as well. In 2026, John Smeal & Co Jewelers and Finish Line closed their doors.

== List of anchor stores ==
Name	Year opened	Year closed	Notes
Sears	1975	2012	Upper level was converted into Burlington
Belk	1975	2012	Formerly known as Belk-Matthews, now Rhythm & Rally
Davison's	1975	1986	Rebranded to Macy's
Macy's	1986, 2005	1998, 2020	Rebranded to Rich's in 1998, then rebranded back to Macy's in 2005
Rich's	1998	2005	Rebranded to Macy's
JCPenney	1975	2017	
Parisian	1997	2007	
Dillard's	1997	2008	
Burlington	2015		Formerly the upper level of Sears
Rhythm & Rally	2024		Formerly Belk
