= North DeKalb Mall =

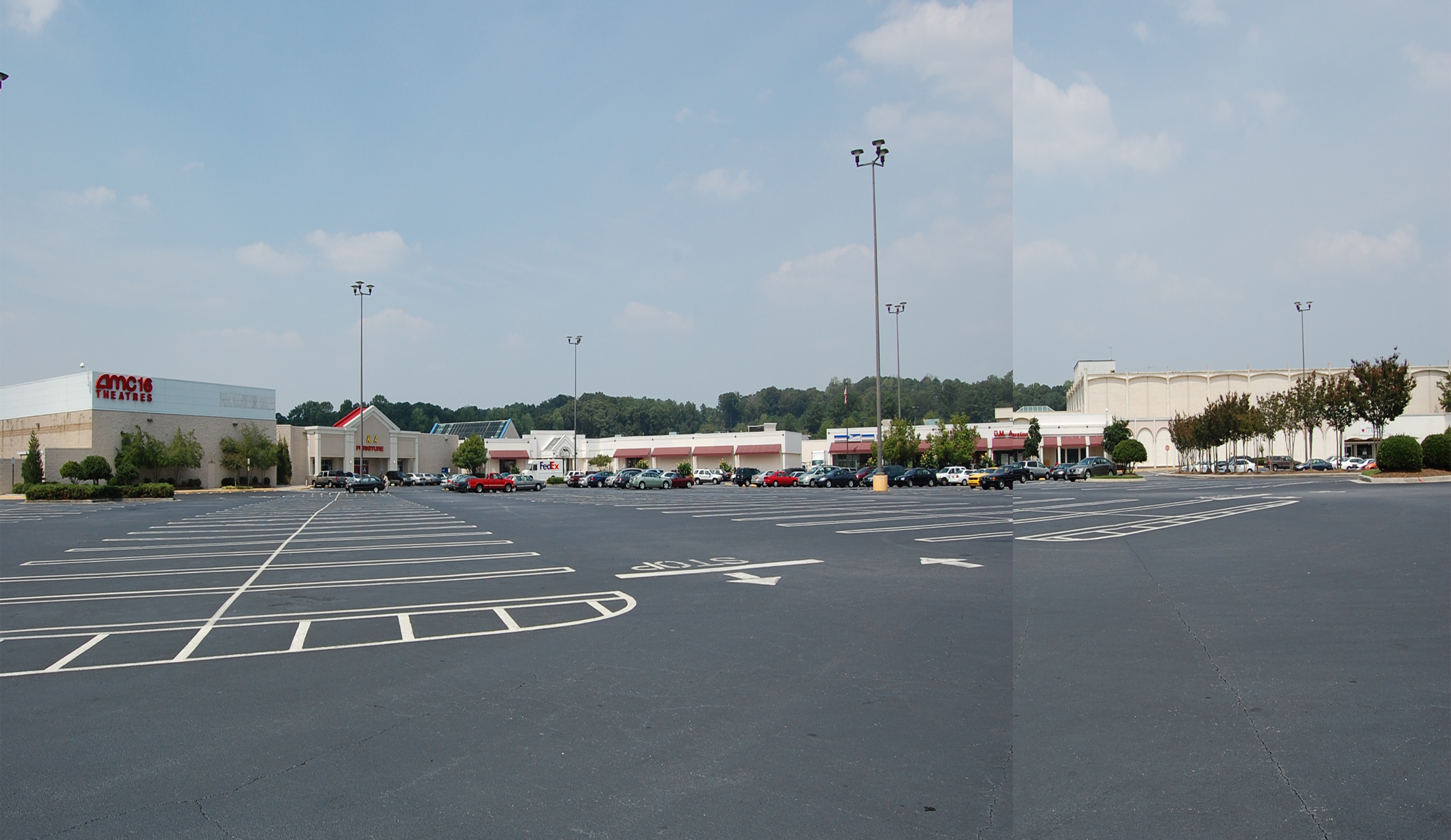
- North DeKalb Mall in 2007
- Location: Near Decatur, Georgia, U.S.
- Coordinates: 33°48′31″N 84°16′34″W
- Opened: July 29, 1965; 61 years ago
- Closed: October 1, 2020
- Developer: Scott Development
- Owner: Lennar & Sterling Organization
- Num. of stores: 85+
- Num. of anchor tenants: 3 (1 open, 2 vacant)
- Floor area: 635,000 square feet (59,000 m^{2})
- Floors: 1
- Website: northdekalbmall.com

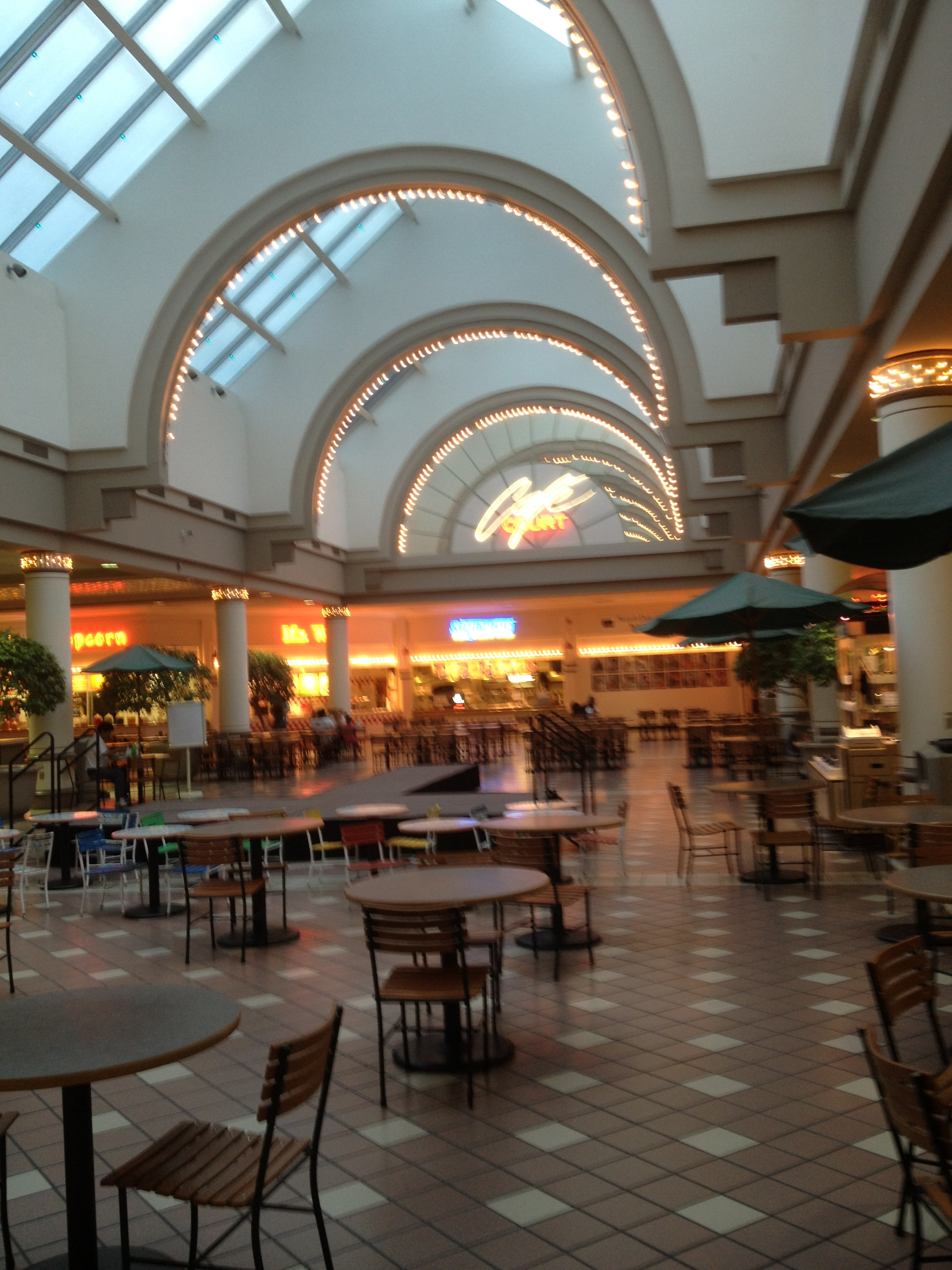
Food court of North DeKalb Mall

North DeKalb Mall was an enclosed shopping mall located in unincorporated DeKalb County, near Decatur, a suburb of Atlanta, Georgia, United States. Opened in 1965, the center currently comprises more than eighty-five stores on one level. The sole remaining anchor store is Marshalls. That store and an AMC multiplex theater still remain. The rest of the mall was demolished in the summer of 2024 and is being replaced with a mixed-use development called Lulah Hills.

== History ==
Originally and formerly called North DeKalb Center, the mall was designed by Barrett + Associates, Architects, and first opened July 29, 1965, with fifty-four stores; original anchor stores included Atlanta-based department store Rich's, and a Woolworth dime store.

Plans for the extension of the Stone Mountain Freeway in the late 1960s would have led to the demolition of the mall, but were never put into effect.

In 1986, North DeKalb Mall was expanded and renovated with two new anchor stores: department store chains Mervyn's and discount chain Lechmere. The mall was renamed Market Square at North DeKalb at this time.

Lechmere closed in 1989 and was replaced with the discount pharmacy chain Phar-Mor, which closed in 1992 and was eventually replaced with a 16-screen AMC movie theater and Rhodes Furniture.

Mervyns shuttered all of its Georgia locations in 1997; the store at North DeKalb was replaced by an Uptons, which closed in 1999, then it became Burlington. Stein Mart was added in the early 1990s, replacing a portion of a mall wing which once housed a Spinnaker's restaurant, a Bonanza Steakhouse and smaller mall stores. Old Navy was also added but later closed, becoming Ross Dress for Less. Rhodes Furniture was later Shoder Furniture for a short time before becoming Marshalls in 2010. A furniture store also replaced the old Stein Mart.

Hendon Properties, which bought the mall for $25 million (USD) in 2003, planned on bringing a Costco to the mall.

On May 15, 2014, Lennar in partnership with Sterling Organization, purchased the mall for an undisclosed amount, with plans to convert the enclosed portion to an open-air concept.

In the spring of 2016, the Macy's anchor closed. North DeKalb Mall has since become the 'almost' mall of DeKalb County with Costco 'almost' becoming a store anchor for nearly a decade. The mall's primary traffic stems from Emory University employees who use North DeKalb Mall's vast parking lots as a temporary location for ride sharing into the university. This along with limited traffic from the AMC movie theater has helped keep the mall from going completely under.

The 2018 Clint Eastwood film The Mule had scenes shot in the parking lot of the mall.

By 2019, multiple vacant storefronts in the North DeKalb Mall in Georgia were now renovated so that they could be used for filming the Fear Street Trilogy. Casual Corner, Software Etc., B. Dalton Bookseller, Musicland and Gadzooks were placed. As of October 1, 2020, North DeKalb Mall had officially closed due to poor sales and the impact of the COVID-19 pandemic. Marshalls and AMC Theatres remain open.

In 2019, the property was sold to Edens, which plans to develop the site into a mixed use facility. In February 2022, local journalists obtained preliminary site plans in a public records request.

Parts of the mall were used in 2021 for the filming of the live-action Loud House film A Loud House Christmas.

North DeKalb Mall was demolished and is being redeveloped as Lulah Hills by commercial real estate developer Edens. Demolition began in June 2024.
