= Limited Too =

American clothing and lifestyle retailer

- Formerly: The Limited Too (1987–1996)
- Type: Subsidiary
- Industry: Retail
- Founded: 1987
- Defunct: 2009
- Fate: Merged with Justice
- Headquarters: New Albany, Ohio, U.S.
- Number of locations: 586 (August 2008)
- Parent: The Limited (1987–1999); Too, Inc. (1999–2006); Tween Brands, Inc. (2006–2009)
- Website: www.limitedtoo.com

Limited Too is a clothing and lifestyle retailer, and current brand, targeting the tween girl market, formerly owned by Tween Brands, Inc. (formerly known as Limited Too, Inc. and Too, Inc.). Since 2015, the brand has been owned by Bluestar Alliance, LLC, having lain dormant for six years after the store bearing its name converted to Justice.

Limited Too sold apparel, underwear, sleepwear, swimwear, lifestyle, accessories, and personal care products for girls age 5–15. At its peak in 2007, Tween Brands operated over 600 Limited Too stores. Three times a year, spring, fall and holiday, Limited Too offered "Too Bucks", which are received with a $50 purchase, and are worth $25 off every $50 purchase (as of 2008) and "Bonus Too Bucks", which are worth $15 off every $40 purchase. On August 12, 2008, Tween Brands announced that the nearly 600 Limited Too stores would convert to the lower-price Justice brand in early 2009, discontinuing the use of the Limited Too name; however, some Limited Too stores retained the old name into 2010.

== History ==
Limited Too was created by The Limited, Inc. in 1987 as an infants, toddlers and younger girls' version of The Limited selling products similar to their adult oriented brand. From 1987 to 1995, the number of stores increased from two to 288 different retail locations. In 1996, a new senior management team refocused Limited Too into a preteen girls fashion store. In 1999, Limited Too, Inc. spun off to establish a strong and independent brand identity.

From 2001 to 2003, the company operated the Mishmash chain that targeted 15- to 20-year-old women and sold apparel, accessories, and gifts and competed head-to-head with chains like Gadzooks, Wet Seal, and the women's businesses of Abercrombie & Fitch, Hollister Co., and American Eagle Outfitters. The chain folded in 2003 because Too Inc. felt that they knew and understood the preteen customer better. Committed to this focus, Too Inc. launched the first Justice: Just for Girls stores in January 2004; many of the early Justice stores were converted Mishmash stores.

On July 10, 2006, Too Inc. completed its name change to Tween Brands, Inc., and began trading on the NYSE under the symbol, 'TWB'. In February 2008, there were 582 Limited Too stores in 47 states and Puerto Rico as well as 25 franchised stores in the Middle East. At its peak, Limited Too had over 600 stores; however, in August 2008, Tween Brands announced that it would discontinue its Limited Too line of 586 stores, although select stores would still offer a line of higher-quality Limited Too clothes in Justice locations. Between December 2008 and June 2010, 26 of these stores closed and 560 others were re-branded as Justice.

After being dormant for several years, the Limited Too IP and trademarks were acquired by Bluestar Alliance, LLC and revived as an online store with select clothing being sold at Amazon.com and other websites.

== Criticism ==
While operating as The Limited Too, stores were proved to practice inverted vanity sizing, leaving inaccuracies in clothing sizes, leading girls who shop there to feel overweight (example: a girl who would wear a size 12 at other stores would wear a 16 or even an 18 at Limited Too stores).

In 2007, Slate published an article by Emily Yoffe that was critical of the clothing offered for preteen girls at several shops, including Limited Too. When she took her eleven-year-old daughter shopping for school clothes, the range available at Limited Too ran to clothing "encrusted with rhinestones or sparkling with glitter", a category Yoffe called "Nitwit Wear" (she mentions a T-shirt with the slogan "I Left My Brain In My Locker"), push-up bras for preteens, and boyshort underwear emblazoned "Buy it now! Tell Dad later!"

In 2026, documents released by the U.S. Department of Justice as part of the Epstein files indicated that a financial trust company associated with convicted human trafficker Jeffrey Epstein had managed TOO, Inc., the parent company of Limited Too, beginning in 2001. Les Wexner, founder of Limited Too's former parent company, was identified in an unsealed FBI document from 2019 as an alleged "co-conspirator" in connection with Epstein's criminal activities.
