= Dickies =

American apparel brand

Williamson-Dickie Mfg. Co.
- Type: Subsidiary
- Industry: Clothing
- Founded: 1922; 104 years ago
- Founder: C. N. Williamson; E. E. "Colonel" Dickie
- Headquarters: Costa Mesa, California, U.S.
- Area served: Worldwide
- Key people: Denny Bruce (CEO)
- Products: Workwear
- Parent: Bluestar Alliance
- Website: www.dickies.com

Williamson-Dickie Mfg. Co. is an American apparel manufacturing company primarily known for its largest brand, Dickies. Today, this brand can be found in more than 100 countries designing, manufacturing, and selling workwear to the automotive, hospitality, construction, and medical industries.

The U.S. corporate division was founded in Fort Worth, Texas, in 1922 by C. N. Williamson and E. E. "Colonel" Dickie, who began a denim bib overall company selling workwear to farm and ranch hands around the Southwest.

== History ==
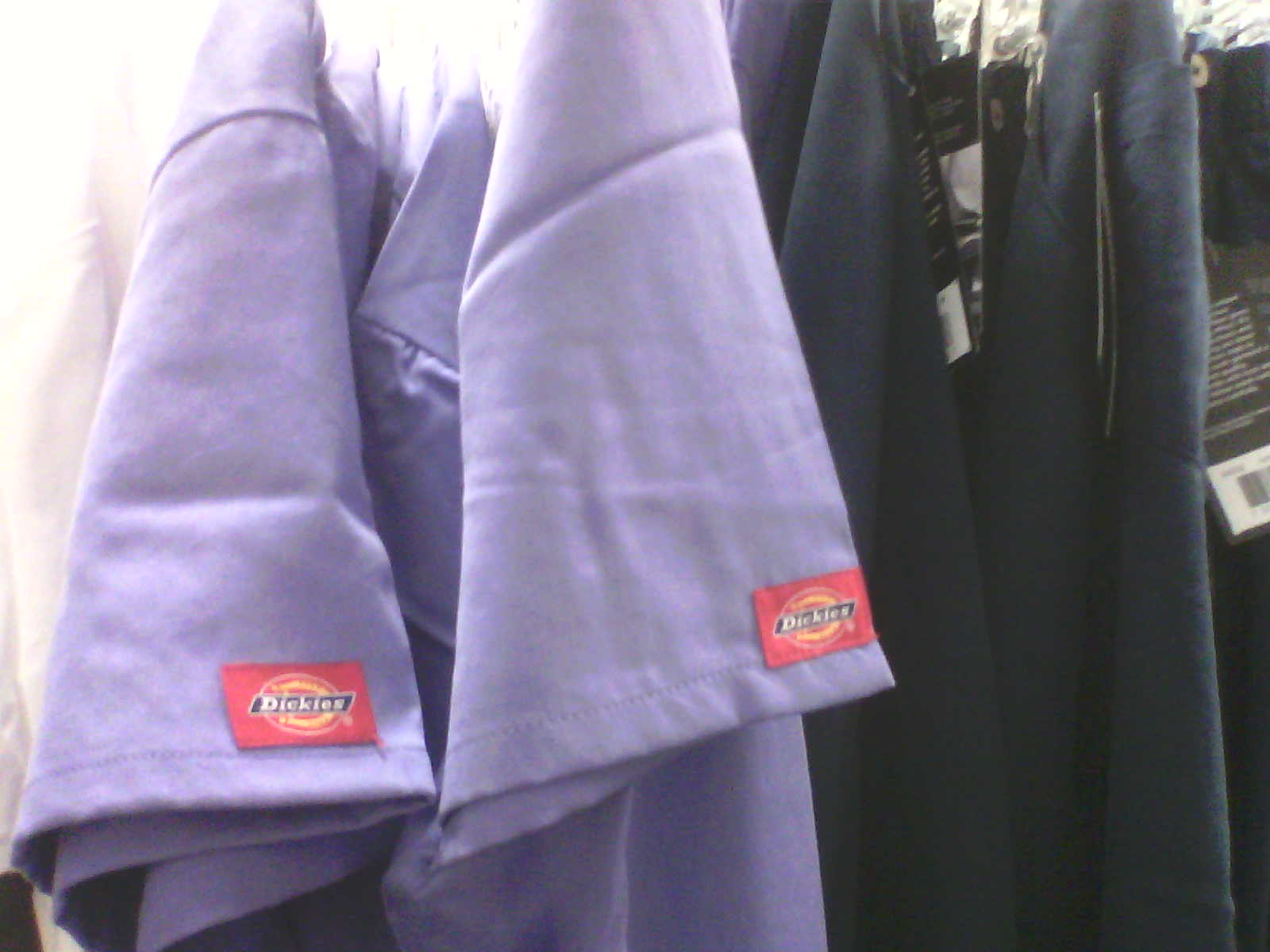
Dickies scrubs uniforms on the rack in a Work 'n Gear store in Dorchester, Massachusetts (December 2012)

Cousins C. N. Williamson and E. E. "Colonel" Dickie were successful salesmen and had already spent 25 years together selling hats in Texas southwest territory. In 1918, they and a few friends established the U.S. Overall Company in Fort Worth, Texas.

Then, in 1922, Col. Dickie, C. N. Williamson and his son C. D. Williamson purchased 100% of the Overall Company on a one-third-each basis and renamed it Williamson-Dickie Manufacturing Company.

From its early years, Williamson-Dickie enjoyed steady growth which was slowed only by the Great Depression, and during World War II the company produced millions of uniforms for the nation's armed forces. In converting to civilian production after the war, C. Don Williamson began a strategy of geographical expansion and established new production facilities, warehouses, and sales territories throughout the United States.

In the late 1950s, Williamson-Dickie became an international company by expanding into the European market and the Middle Eastern market—where Texas oilmen introduced the Dickies brand to Middle Eastern oil fields.

In 2008, five years before buying Walls, it acquired Kodiak Group Holdings Inc. of Canada. In 2014, Jerry Leigh of California became the exclusive licensee for Dickies Girl juniors' apparel.

VF Corporation acquired Williamson-Dickie in 2017 for $820 million in cash. In late November 2024, it was announced that Dickies' headquarters would be relocating to California by the end of May 2025.

On November 12, 2025, it was announced that Bluestar Alliance LLC had completed its acquisition of Dickies from VF Corporation for approximately $600 million in cash.

== Williamson-Dickie Europe Ltd ==
Williamson-Dickie Europe Ltd is based in the U.K. in Westfield, Somerset. Previously known as Dickies UK, this division of the company now operates across the entirety of Europe and the Middle East for both the workwear and streetwear product ranges.

== Retail and collaborations ==
Dickies is sold in the U.S., Saudi Arabia, South Africa, Australia, Russia, Chile, South Korea, Japan, Taiwan, Iceland, Canada, Germany, France, Italy, Ireland, Croatia, the Philippines, Poland, Mongolia, and Mexico.

In June 2020, Dickies collaborated with the Japanese brand FACETASM creating a capsule collection.

== See also ==
- Big Tex, the Texas State Fair mascot for which Dickies currently provides the oversized clothing for
- Ariat Arena, an indoor arena in Fort Worth, Texas for which the company used to hold the naming rights
