= The Shoppes at River Crossing =

Coordinates: 32.92598°N 83.71331°W

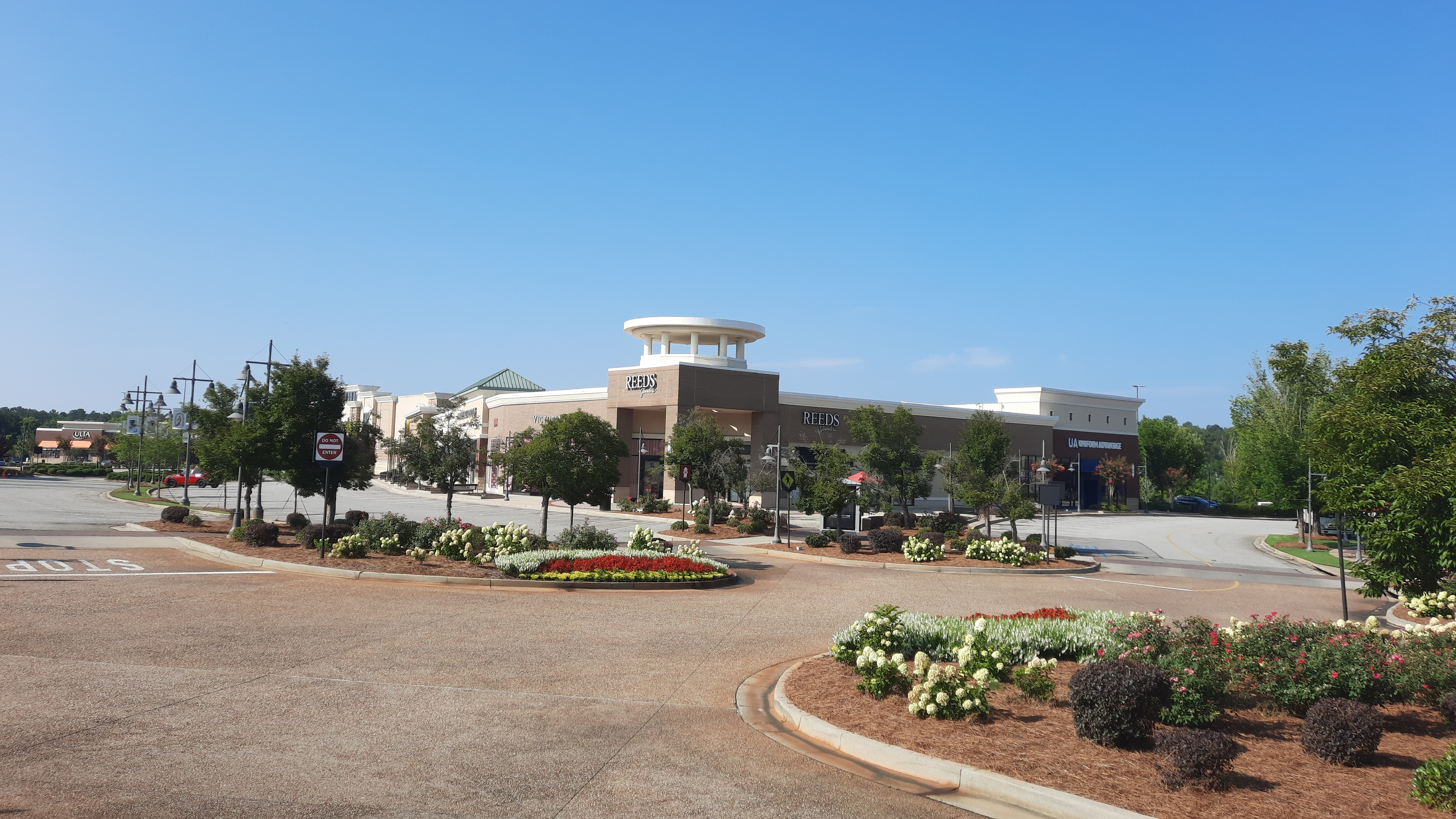
- View of the center of the mall, facing South
- Location: Macon, Georgia
- Opened: March 19, 2008; 18 years ago
- Developer: General Growth Properties
- Manager: GGP
- Owner: GGP
- Num. of stores: 60+
- Num. of anchor tenants: 2
- Floor area: 750,000 sq ft (70,000 m^{2})
- Website: theshoppesatrivercrossing.com

The Shoppes at River Crossing is a super regional lifestyle center located in Macon, Georgia. It was developed by General Growth Properties as a response to the declining area around the older Macon Mall. Phase I opened March 19, 2008, while phase II opened shortly after. It is anchored by Belk and Dillard's, with Barnes & Noble, PetSmart, and PopShelf serving as junior anchors.

== History ==
=== Early years (2008-2012) ===
The Shoppes at River Crossing opened its first phase in March 2008. Phase II opened later on. A Circuit City was planned and built, but never opened due to the company's bankruptcy. Charming Charlie and PeachMac (later SimplyMac) opened in 2009. Also in 2009, the Carlyle & Co. jewelry store closed. Jo-Ann Fabrics opened in the planned Circuit City in 2010. In 2011, three new stores opened at The Shoppes at River Crossing - White House Black Market, Buckle, and Texas Roadhouse. In January 2012, Christopher & Banks, as well as their CJ Banks store closed. 2012 also saw the openings of The Children's Place, Soma Intimates, Things Remembered, Buca di Beppo and Kirkland's. Despite the growth of The Shoppes at River Crossing, several stores would leave early on, including Build-A-Bear, As Seen On TV, Strasburg Children, Merle Norman, and Wolf Camera.

=== Expansion and closures (2014-2015) ===
In 2014, two new junior anchors were announced, those being PetSmart and Pier 1 Imports. Justice and Pandora would also open around this time. Coach would close in 2014, along with Coldwater Creek which closed due to corporate bankruptcy. Pier 1 Imports would open in 2015. The Sticky Fingers restaurant also closed at this point. In early 2015, Body Central closed due to corporate bankruptcy, but was quickly replaced by Rue 21.

=== Continued rise (2016-2018) ===
In 2016, H&M opened a 19,000 sq ft store at The Shoppes at River Crossing. Aeropostale would leave the mall around this time, and it was replaced with a Torrid store. In 2017, Buca di Beppo closed their doors, with Zoes Kitchen replacing part of the space. The rest of the former Buca Di Beppo was turned into a T-Mobile store. That same year, the former Sticky Fingers was demolished, with a new Olive Garden replacing it. The Olive Garden would open in January 2018.

=== Current state (2020-present) ===
In 2020, Pier 1 Imports would close their doors. Spirit Halloween temporarily opened in the former Pier 1 later that year. Throughout the early 2020s, several stores would leave The Shoppes at River Crossing, including Portrait Innovations, Justice, Yankee Candle, New York & Company, Lids, Jos. A Bank, and others. Later on, pOpshelf would open in the former Pier 1. Other stores would open in recent years, including Sephora, Windsor, and Zumiez. In 2025, it was announced that the Jo-Ann Fabrics would close. The store closed in May of 2025. Torrid would also leave around this time. In October 2025, Spencer's would open in the vacant Justice store, and Super Chix would open in the vacant Buca di Beppo/Zoes Kitchen. A children's play area called GiggleTown opened in the vacant Charming Charlie in 2025. In 2026, Francesca's announced their bankruptcy, which led to the closure of their location at The Shoppes at River Crossing.

== Anchors ==
- Belk (2008-present)
- Dillard's (2008-present)

== Junior anchors ==
- Barnes & Noble (2008-present)
- Dick's Sporting Goods (2009-present)
- Jo-Ann Fabrics (2010-2025)
- PetSmart (2015-present)
- Pier 1 Imports (2015-2020)
- PopShelf (2022-present)
