= Bluestar Alliance =

American brand management firm

- Type: Private
- Industry: Retail
- Founded: 2007; 19 years ago
- Founder: Joseph Gabbay; Ralph Gindi
- Website: bluestaralliance.com

Bluestar Alliance LLC is a brand management firm founded in 2007 by Joseph Gabbay and Ralph Gindi. Bluestar Alliance manages a portfolio of fashion and lifestyle brands with $13 billion in global retail sales, including Off-White, Palm Angels, Dickies, Scotch & Soda, Hurley, Justice, Bebe, Elie Tahari, Limited Too, and Brookstone.
