= Westgate Mall (Georgia) =

Coordinates: 32.81368°N 83.664851°W

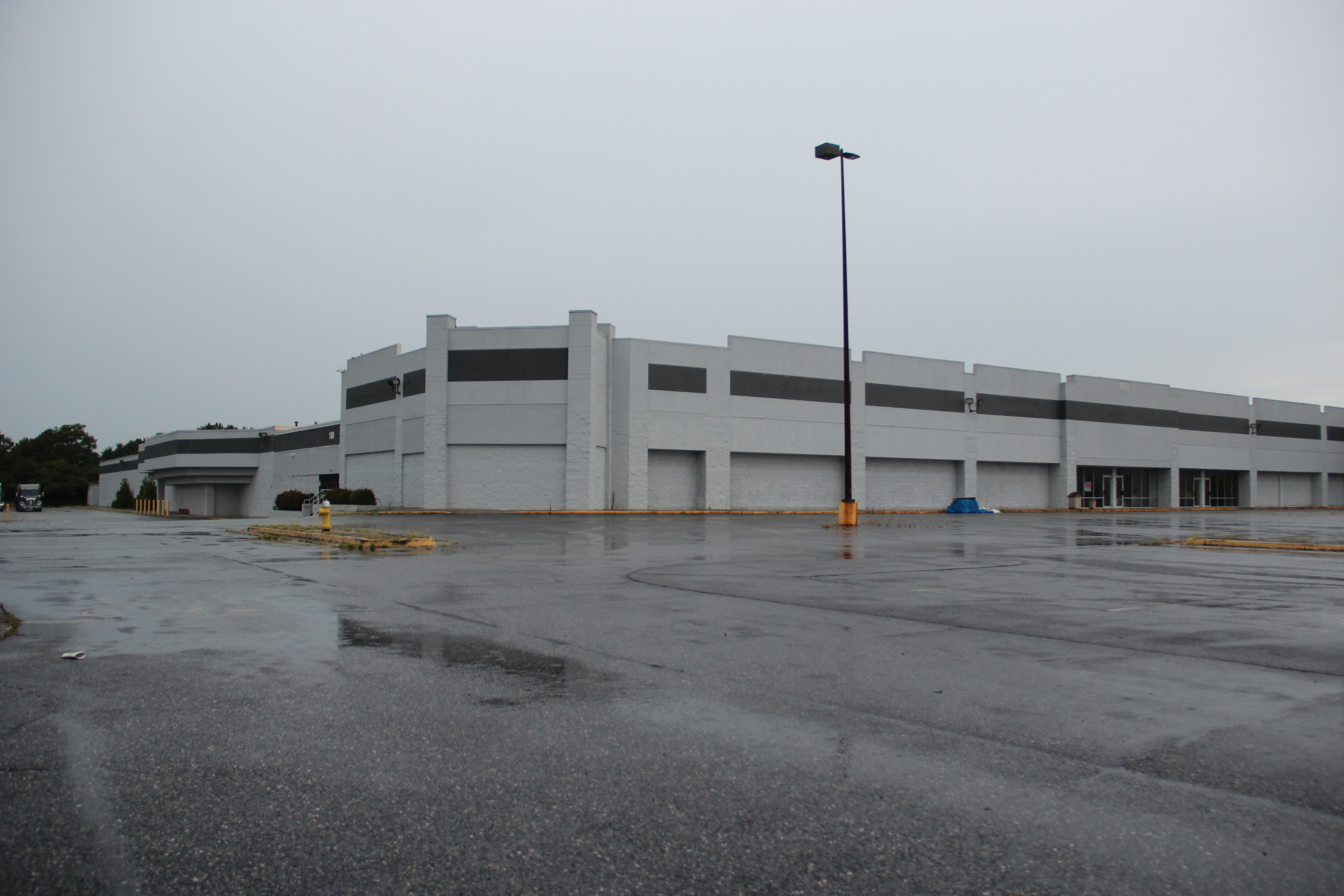
Westgate Mall location in 2024

Westgate Shopping Center (a.k.a. Westgate Mall) was the first fully enclosed shopping mall in Georgia. It opened in 1961, a year after Eastwood opened in Birmingham, Alabama. Like Eastwood, Westgate had no department store anchors but was prominently anchored by five and dime store JJ Newberry's.

== History ==
Like most of the earliest malls, Westgate Mall did not affect downtown shopping since it had few anchors and a smaller selection of choices. These early malls were essentially strip malls turned facing each other with a central corridor. Stores in Downtown Macon actually continued to thrive until the 1970s, when Macon Mall came about.

Like Eastwood Mall, Westgate was anchored by two grocery stores - Piggly Wiggly and Colonial Stores - in addition to JJ Newberry's. A single-screen movie theater was built in 1966, which was later converted to a three-screen theater known as the Westgate Triple Cinemas. Other tenants during this early period included Woolworth's, Sherwin-Williams, and Eckerd's.

== Closure and demolition ==
Macon Mall siphoned off most of the business from Westgate Mall starting in 1975, which ultimately led to its deterioration. The mall was mostly empty by 1978, and an attempt was made to turn Westgate into an outlet mall. Later, Wal-Mart was added in 1988 and Scotty's Builders Supply replaced the Piggly Wiggly on the north side. Burlington Coat Factory replaced Key Wholesale Distributors, where Newberry's originally stood.

All of these efforts proved futile to save a mall with no department store anchors in close proximity to the Macon Mall. Between 1994 and 1995, the mall was demolished, save for Wal-Mart, Home Depot, and the movie theater, which was also later demolished.

== Westgate Shopping Center ==
The strip mall that replaced Westgate Mall included, in addition to Burlington and Wal-Mart, Media Play, PetSmart, OfficeMax, Shoe Carnival, and Home Depot, which replaced Scotty's. Westgate eventually fell into decline again, and by 2019 was 86% empty. Most of the tenants moved to the nearby strip mall Eisenhower Crossing, including Home Depot and PetSmart. In 2015, Burlington moved to Macon Mall.

As of 2020, a new developer, Uptown Realty, has begun redevelopment of the Westgate Shopping Center. Now to be known as Middle Georgia Industrial Park, the area will become a complex intended to feature office facilities, warehouses, and retail stores.
