= Off-White (company) =

Italian-American luxury fashion label

Off-White Operating S.r.l.
- Formerly: PYREX VISION
- Type: Società a responsabilità limitata
- Industry: Fashion
- Founded: 2013; 13 years ago in Milan, Italy
- Founder: Virgil Abloh
- Headquarters: Milan, Italy
- Number of locations: 59 (as of 2024)
- Area served: Worldwide
- Key people: Cristiano Fagnani (CEO)
- Products: Clothing, shoes, accessories, branding
- Owner: Bluestar Alliance (60%); Farfetch (40%)
- Website: www.off---white.com

Off-White (stylized as Off-White™ or OFF-WHITE c/o VIRGIL ABLOH™) is an Italian luxury fashion brand founded by American fashion designer and entrepreneur Virgil Abloh in Milan in 2013. In September 2024, LVMH sold it to brand management company Bluestar Alliance.

== History ==
The company was first founded as "PYREX VISION" by Virgil Abloh in Milan, Italy in 2012. Abloh then rebranded the company as Off-White in 2013, which he described as "the grey area between black and white as the color off-white" to the fashion world. It has shown collections at Paris Fashion Week shows, and is sold in boutiques in Hong Kong, Tokyo, Milan, London, and New York City.

In August 2019, the British e-commerce company Farfetch, purchased Off-White's parent organization New Guards Group for US$675 million.

In July 2021, LVMH announced it would be taking a 60% stake in Off-White, with Farfetch retaining the remaining 40%. However, Abloh owned the trademark for Off-White.

Ib Kamara was appointed Art & Image Director for Off-White on April 30, 2022.

In 2024, LVMH sold Off-White to Bluestar Alliance.

In August 2026, Ib Kamara left his role as creative director of Off-White.

== Stores ==
In December 2016, Off-White opened its first store in the United States, a temporary shop on Melrose Avenue in West Hollywood, across the street from the boutique Maxfield, as part of Maxfield's pop-up series. Abloh described the space as an "estate sale". Open from December 8, 2016, to January 29, 2017, it sold a 36-piece vintage-inspired capsule collection alongside furniture by Abloh and home goods from the collection of Maxfield founder Tommy Perse.

In 2020, Off-White opened a two-story flagship store in the Miami Design District, designed by Abloh with AMO, the research arm of the Office for Metropolitan Architecture, led by Samir Bantal. Conceived as a flexible space for retail, events and art display, the store opened with two artworks: Abloh's Dollar a Gallon III and Roller by Mark Jenkins, commissioned by Abloh.

== Collaborations ==
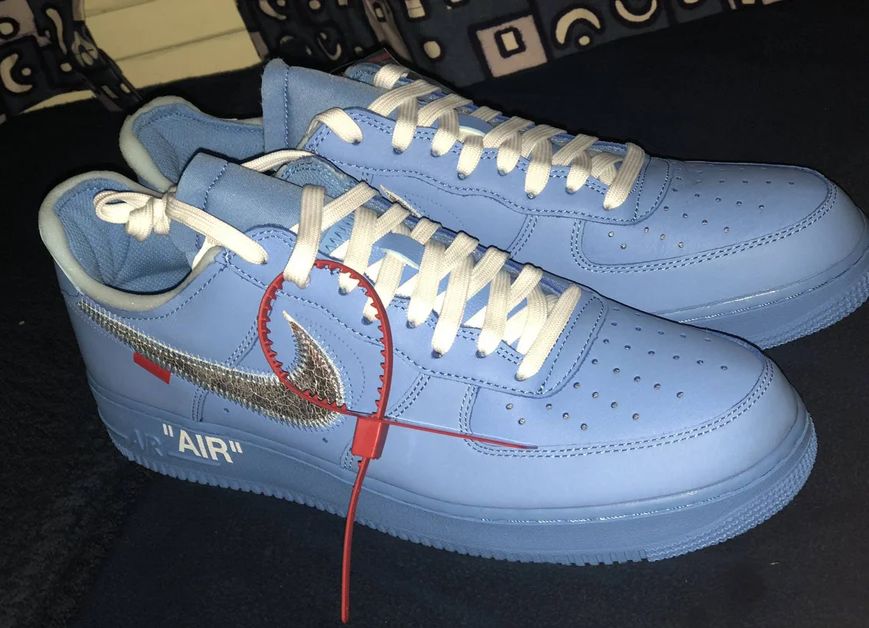
Off-White's collaboration with Chicago's Museum of Contemporary Art

In Fall 2016, and Winter 2017, the company collaborated with Levi's main line, Made & Crafted, and released twelve pieces, six of which were unisex.

In early 2017, the company collaborated with Nike and worked on a project named "The Ten", which is a sneaker collection featuring Air Jordans, Converse, Nike Air Max, Nike Air Force One, and Nike Blazers shoes. The collaborations shoe line was divided into two categories, the "Revealing" and "Ghosting". The Off-White and Nike designers had an updated take on Nineties-style shoes, with various patterns and different types of material such as plastic and tulle.

In 2017, the company collaborated with Champion developing sixteen items of clothing, including tracksuits, hoodies, fleeces, and t-shirts. In August 2017, the company also collaborated with ASAP Rocky with his label AWGE. In 2018, the company partnered with Jimmy Choo to create a Summer/Spring collection inspired by Lady Diana, former Princess of Wales.

In April 2018, the company collaborated with IKEA on furniture targeted towards millennials. In Fall 2018 and Winter 2019, the company collaborated with Sunglass Hut on a unisex line of sunglasses called "For Your Eyes Only". In March 2019, the company collaborated with SSENSE on a range of workout clothes. On June 5, 2018, the company released its collaboration with Rimowa, a transparent suitcase in limited edition. Following the success of the collaboration, a second collection including two RIMOWA x Off-White transparent suitcases (a white version and a black version) was launched in October 2018.

In June 2019, the company collaborated with the Museum of Contemporary Art in Chicago, to create a new "University Blue" color of the Nike Air Force One. In 2022, the brand entered a partnership with AC Milan providing streetwear for the Rossoneri.

From 2023 to 2024, the company collaborated with Mattel Creations to create 4 Off-White™ c/o Monster High dolls. The Off-White™ team hand-picked each outfit from their most iconic runway shows. Those being from 2018, the Spring 2017 collection, the SS17 collection and the 2020 fall collection. “The Off-White™ team sent us references of patterns, runway photography and even some in-house samples to understand the construction of the garments and accessories,” said Mattel Creations designer Annalise Lao.

In September 2024, the company showed a collection for the first time at New York Fashion Week and entered a multi-year partnership with WNBA team New York Liberty.

== Legacy and influence ==
Off-White helped popularize the combination of streetwear and luxury fashion during the 2010s. Writing in British Vogue, Luke Leitch described the label as a pioneer of this convergence, linking its identity to founder Virgil Abloh's emphasis on community and inclusion. Its prominence was reflected in the third quarter of 2018, when it overtook Gucci as the highest-ranked brand in the Lyst Index.

The label became associated with a referential approach to design, including the use of quotation marks to label familiar objects and garments. Abloh compared this practice to musical sampling and Marcel Duchamp's concept of the readymade. Its 2017 collaboration with Nike, The Ten, applied a deconstructed aesthetic to established footwear designs through exposed foam, visible stitching, zip ties and printed text. Sotheby's reported that the collection sold out upon release and became sought after by collectors.

Off-White's work has also been presented in museum exhibitions examining Abloh's relationship with fashion, art and popular culture. The 2022 presentation of Virgil Abloh: Figures of Speech at the Brooklyn Museum included selections from Off-White collections and a rug created for the label's 2016 runway show. Curator Antwaun Sargent connected the exhibition to Abloh's role in expanding institutional recognition of Black creativity across fashion, architecture and art.

== See also ==
- Louis Vuitton
- Nike and Off-White: 'The Ten'
