= Hurley International =

American company

Hurley, Inc.
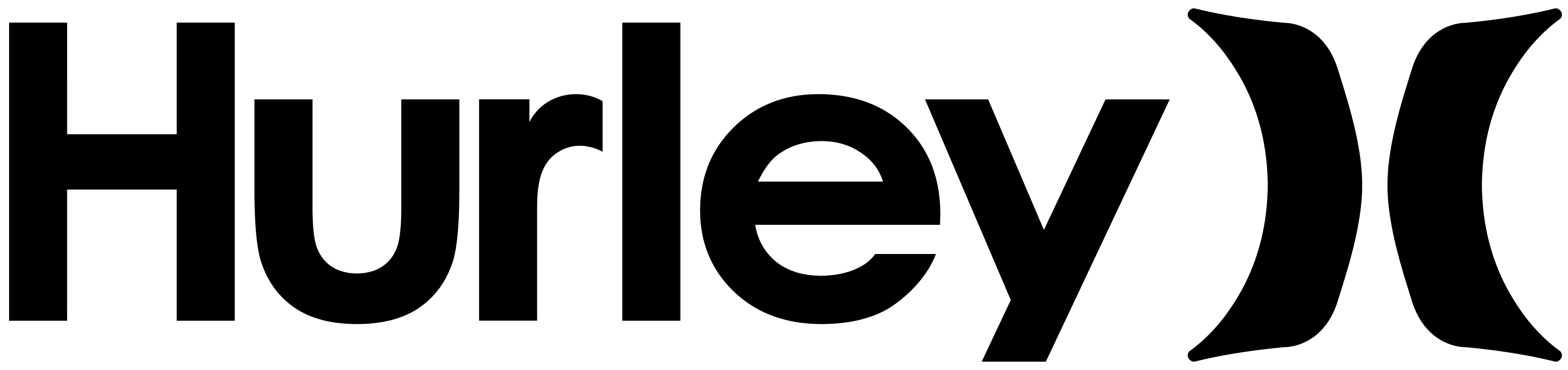
- Type: Subsidiary
- Industry: Textile
- Founded: 1979; 47 years ago
- Founder: Bob Hurley
- Headquarters: Costa Mesa, California, U.S.
- Number of locations: 37 (December 06, 2024)
- Key people: Bob Hurley (former CEO)
- Products: Swimsuits, wetsuit, clothing, accessories, active wear
- Parent: Bluestar Alliance
- Website: hurley.com

Hurley, Inc. is an American company that sells clothes and accessories marketed towards surfing and swimming. Established in 1979 as a distributor for Billabong clothing in the United States, Hurley was sold to Nike, Inc. in 2002 for an undisclosed price and then to Bluestar Alliance LLC in 2019 for an undisclosed price.

Products sold include clothing, swimsuits, wetsuits, flip-flops (sandals), bags and backpacks.

== History ==
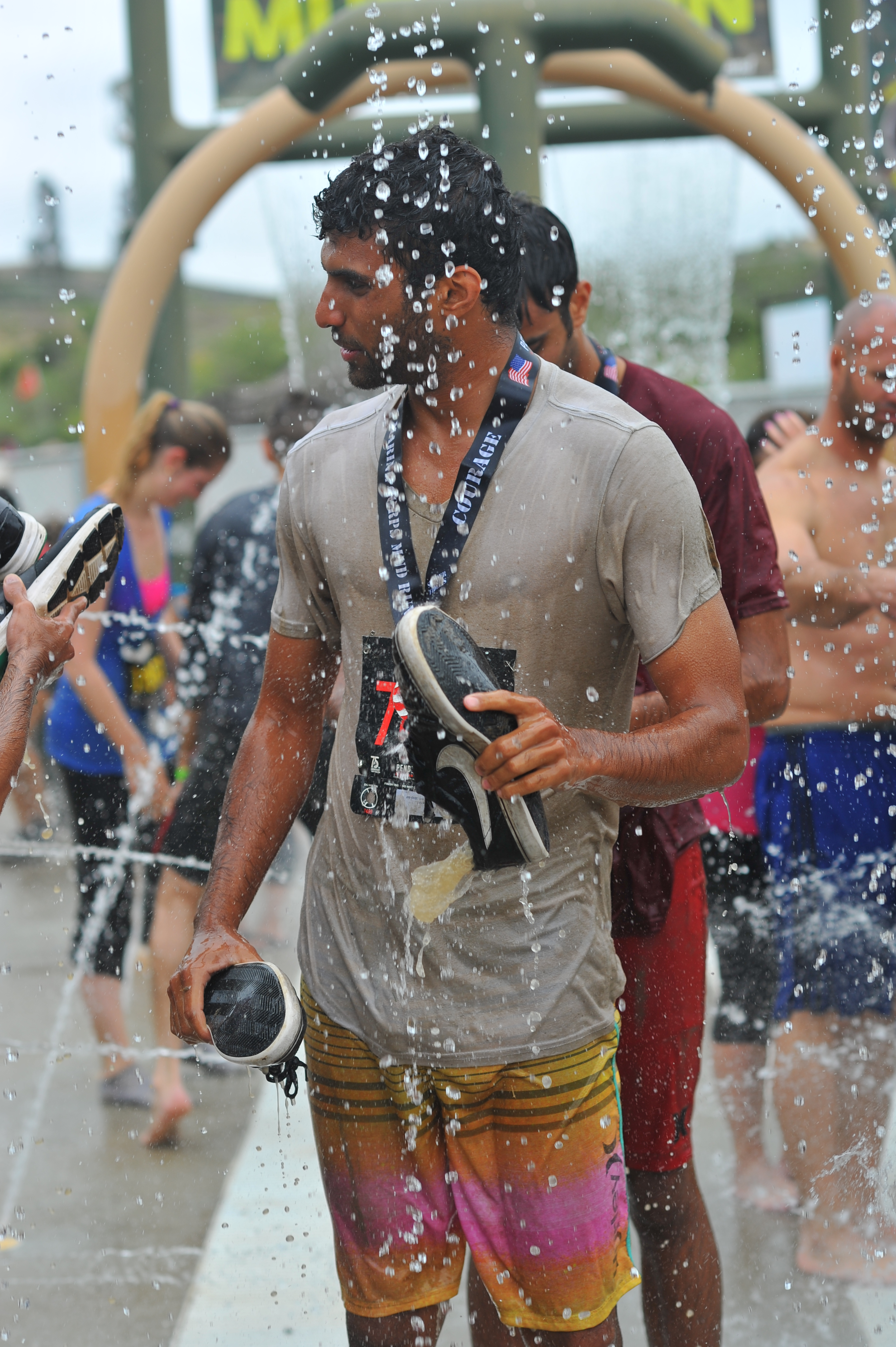
Man wearing Hurley boardshorts.

Hurley was founded in 1979 by 24-year-old Bob Hurley (along with partner Bob Rowland and Business Manager Joe Knoernschild) as "Hurley Surfboards//International Pro Designs" (I.P.D.). Hurley worked for five years as a surf board shaper for various companies; including Lightning Bolt; Wind-an-Sea and Wave Tools. While making surfboards in Southern California, Hurley licensed the U.S. rights to the up-and-coming Australian surf brand Billabong, and formed Billabong USA in 1983. Founding partners in Billabong USA besides Hurley were Bob Rowland (General Partners), and as limited partners Chip Rowland, Mike Ochsner, Joe Knoernschild, Tom Fletcher and Bill Hurley. By the mid-1980s, Billabong USA was doing well.

In 1998, the U.S. licensing rights for Billabong were up for renewal after the company had grown to over $70 million in sales in America. The USA management team decided to not renew the USA license for Billabong USA, and in 1999 Hurley International was born. Founding working partners of Billabong USA Hurley, Knoernschild, Ochsner and Bill Hurley transitioned over to Hurley International. Billabong USA's designer Lian Murray also became a partner with the newly created Hurley International.

On February 22, 2002, the company was sold to Nike, Inc. for an undisclosed amount.

On June 4, 2012, Bob Hurley assumed the interim CEO role at Hurley International, LLC. replacing Michael Egeck who had decided to leave the company. Hurley stepped down as CEO in 2015 and was replaced by Bob Coombes. In June 2019, Nike Inc. appointed John Schweitzer as CEO and CFO of the Hurley brand.

On October 29, 2019, Nike announced the sale of Hurley to Bluestar Alliance LLC for an undisclosed amount. On December 28, 2019, surf publication Beach Grit reported that Hurley would not renew the contracts of professional surfers it sponsors.

On the 23rd January 2020, Conquest Sports, the licensee for the Converse brand in Australia and New Zealand announced a joint venture partnership with Blue Star Alliance LLC (USA) to distribute the Hurley brand in Australia and New Zealand. The Hurley brand trades under the company Hurley Australasia PTY Ltd since March 1, 2020 for Australia & New Zealand. Hurley then launched its first Australian focused site (https://www.hurley.com.au/) in July 2021.
