= H. H. Gregg =

American online retailer (2017–present)

hhgregg Inc.
- Formerly: Gregg Appliances, Inc. (1955-2007)
- Type: Public (2007–2017); Private (2017–present)
- Traded as: NYSE: HGG (2007–2017)
- Industry: Retail
- Founded: April 15, 1955; 71 years ago (original); August 17, 2017; 9 years ago (online Reboot)
- Founders: Henry Harold Gregg; Fansy Gregg
- Defunct: May 25, 2017; 9 years ago (original)
- Fate: Chapter 7 bankruptcy Liquidation sale (original)
- Headquarters: Somerset, New Jersey, U.S.
- Key people: Eli Sapharti (Director of Retail Operations)
- Products: Retailing–Electronics and appliances
- Revenue: ▼US$ 1.96 B (FY 2016)
- Operating income: ▲US$ -51.73 M (FY 2016)
- Net income: ▲US$ -54.88 M (FY 2016)
- Total assets: ▼US$ 385.35 M (FY 2016)
- Owner: Valor Group LLC (2017–present)
- Number of employees: 130 (2019)
- Website: hhgregg.com

hhgregg, Inc. or H. H. Gregg (Note: The name is stylized in various spellings including H. H. Gregg, hhgregg, HHgregg and HHGregg. This article uses H. H. Gregg for consistency) is an American online retailer and former retail chain of consumer electronics and home appliances that operated stores in the Midwest, Northeast, and Southeast United States including states such as Alabama, Delaware, Florida, Georgia, Illinois, Indiana, Kentucky, Louisiana, Maryland, Mississippi, Missouri, New Jersey, North Carolina, Ohio, Pennsylvania, South Carolina, Tennessee, Virginia, West Virginia and Wisconsin. Valor Group LLC purchased the brand from the company's bankruptcy trustee for $400,000 (~$515,920 in 2025) in 2017. H. H. Gregg closed all stores in liquidation and had been operating as an online-only retailer since August that year. Founded in Princeton, Indiana, in 1955, H. H. Gregg was headquartered in Indianapolis, Indiana, when it ceased operating. Its retail offerings included home entertainment video and audio products, computers, and other selected consumer electronics and home appliances, such as refrigerators, ranges, dishwashers, freezers, washers, dryers, and other products and services, including mattresses.

H. H. Gregg reported an annual revenue of US$1.96 billion in fiscal year 2016.

In 2017, H. H. Gregg filed for Chapter 11 bankruptcy. The filing followed the decision to close 88 unprofitable locations outside of its core markets. Troubles for H. H. Gregg continued, and the Chapter 11 case was ultimately converted to Chapter 7 liquidation. The company announced later that year that it would also close all of its other stores (132 more than the 88 previously announced closures) in the coming months and would lay off about 5,000 people.

== History ==
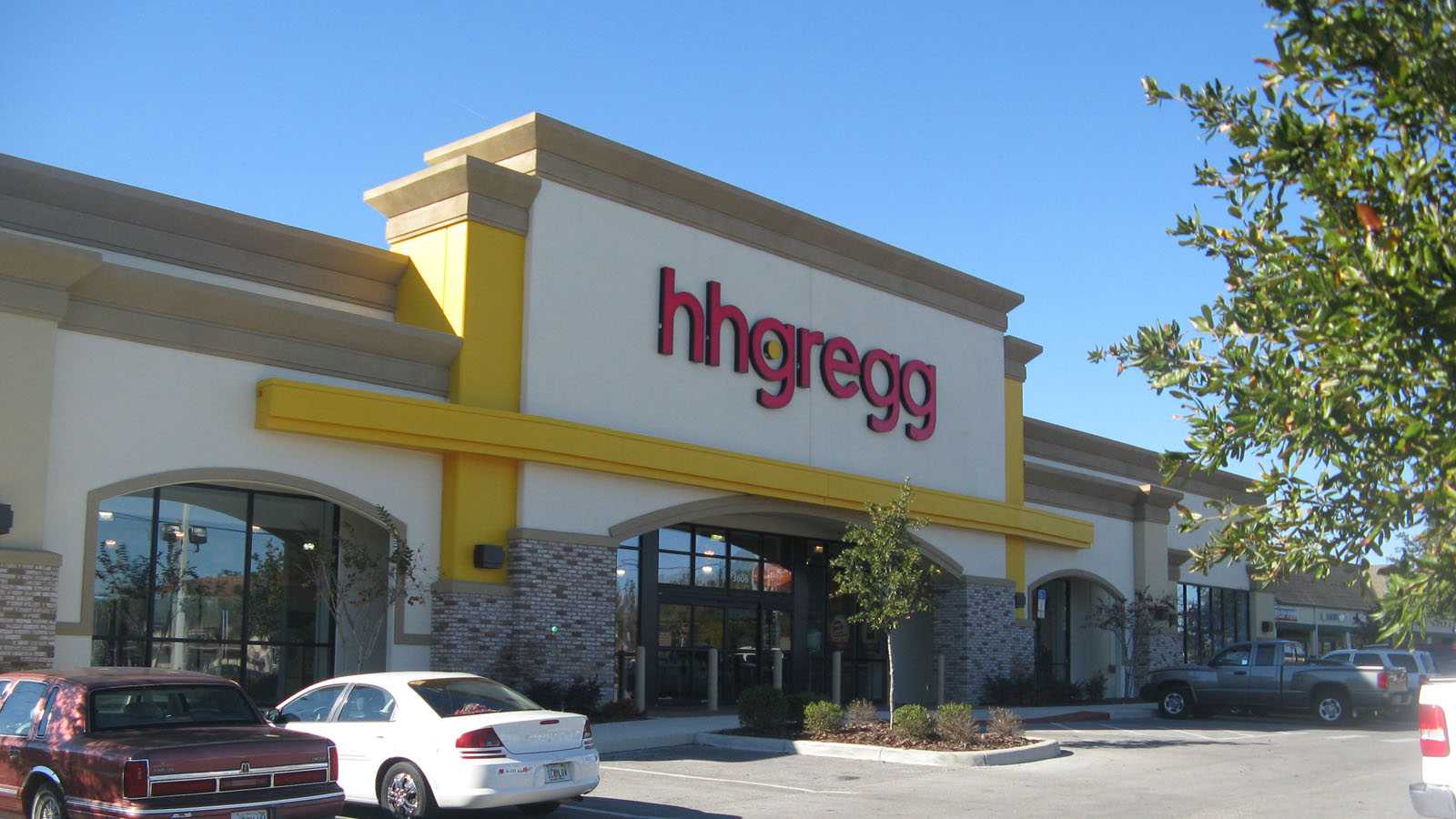
An H. H. Gregg retail store in Florida (2008)

In 1955, a small storefront was erected by Henry Harold and Fansy Gregg on the north side of Indianapolis. The new store featured home appliances, featuring washing machines, clothes dryers, refrigerators, and grills. Shortly thereafter, they began selling televisions and other electronics.

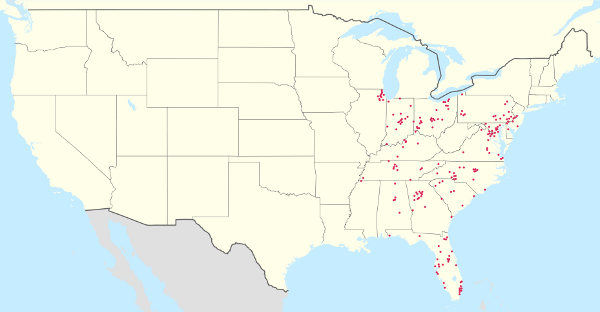
Map of hhgregg stores in the U.S. in August 2011

In 1975, Jerry W. Throgmartin began working in his grandfather's store while attending middle school. He eventually worked his way through many positions there over the next 24 years, and in 1999, took over his father's position as Chairman, CEO, and Director of H. H. Gregg Appliances and Electronics.

Dennis L. May succeeded Throgmartin as H. H. Gregg's president and chief executive officer in 2009, and Throgmartin was named Executive Chairman of the Board. Throgmartin died in January 2012.

Despite market trends that have diminished profit margins on high-tech devices, Throgmartin and May expanded the business to 125 stores in 9 states as of October 2009. Throgmartin said, "We've been fortunate in that the areas of the [consumer electronics] business that have been strong are the areas in which we excel: high-end large-screen flat-panel TVs and home theater, and higher-end appliances".

In 2009, the company announced that it planned to open 22 stores in the following year, primarily in Richmond, Virginia, Tampa, Florida, and in Memphis, Tennessee, many of them being in buildings formerly occupied by defunct Circuit City, as part of an aggressive growth strategy to fill the gap created by Circuit City's bankruptcy. In December 2009, construction began on several stores in the central and eastern parts of Pennsylvania, the first in the state. March 2010 brought the openings of the first stores in the Norfolk-Virginia Beach metro area, in converted Circuit City and Linens 'n Things locations. In Spring 2011, the company expanded into the Youngstown, Ohio market with the opening of a store in the Youngstown suburb Boardman. Ten stores opened in July 2011 in South Florida along the east coast from Miami to West Palm Beach.

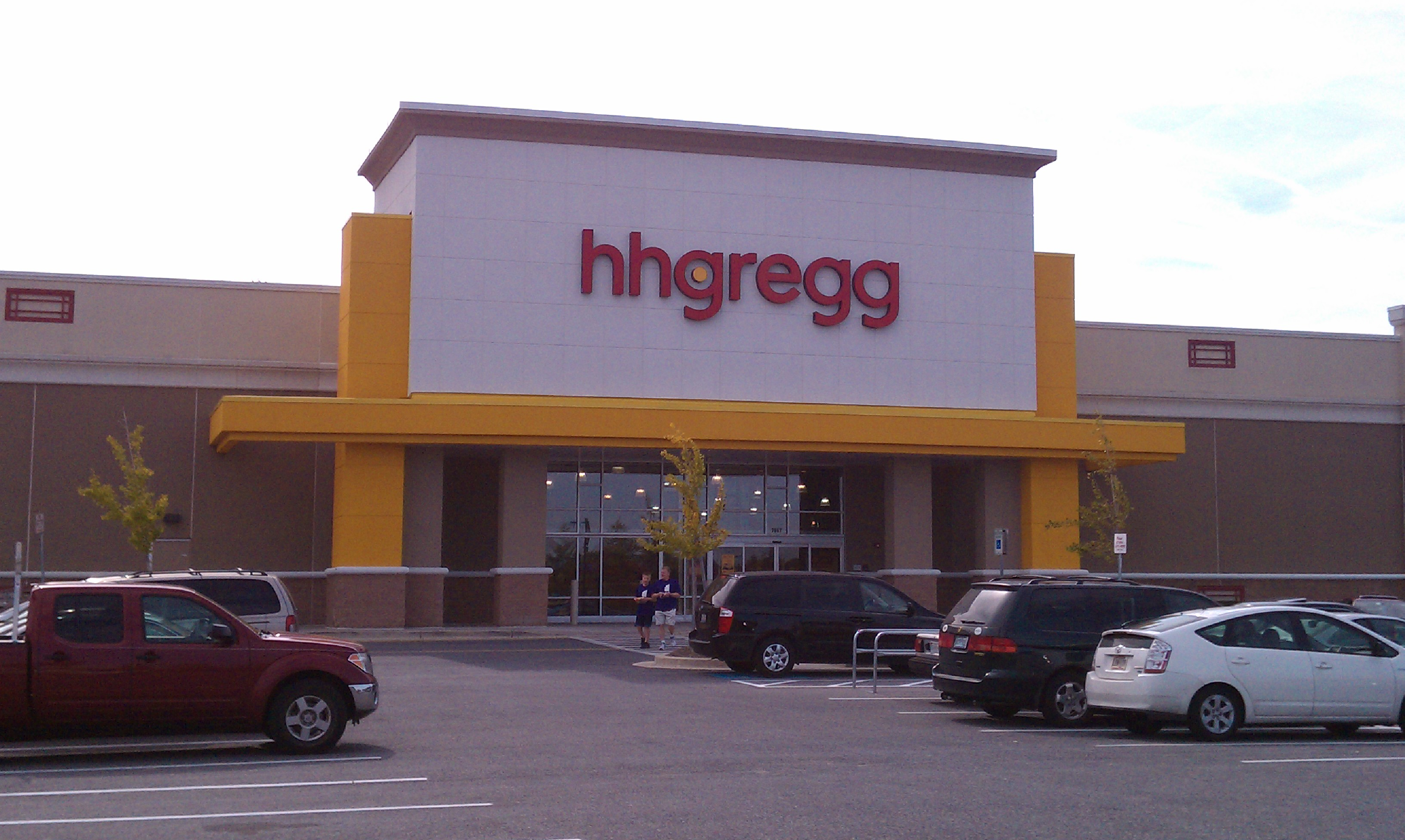
An H. H. Gregg store in Hanover, Maryland; opened in 2010 in a former Circuit City location

In the fall of 2010, H. H. Gregg opened several stores in former Circuit City locations in Maryland and Virginia. Also, in late 2010, H. H. Gregg partnered with The Cellular Connection, a cellular phone wholesaler based out of Indianapolis, to roll out kiosks to sell Verizon Wireless products.

In 2011, H. H. Gregg opened locations in Myrtle Beach, South Carolina, the Pittsburgh metropolitan area, the Chicago area, and the St. Louis, Missouri metropolitan area.

In August 2012, H. H. Gregg made its debut in Wisconsin by opening stores in Appleton, Brown Deer, Greenfield, Green Bay, and Racine. However, all Wisconsin stores closed in 2016, only lasting 4 years. In November 2012, it entered Louisiana with stores in the New Orleans metropolitan area and in Baton Rouge.

The company's motto was "Gregg's Got It!", and their official mascot was an animated talking catalogue called HH, voiced by Wally Wingert and bearing likeness to that of the video-game character Rayman, while also being infamous online.

In 2016, May resigned as CEO, and Robert Riesbeck was named interim CEO and later the permanent CEO. After a buyout offer fell through, Riesbeck was terminated along with CIO Tom Schuetz and Chief Merchandising Officer Aaron Trahan. Kevin Kovacs (CFO at the time) was named CEO and president in 2017.

=== Bankruptcy ===
On March 6, 2017, H. H. Gregg filed for Chapter 11 bankruptcy. The filing followed the closure of 88 unprofitable locations outside of its core markets. BML Investment Partners, L.P. acquired at least 7.5% of the company by January 26, 2017. On February 15, 2017, the company announced it was exploring "strategic alternatives", implicitly a sale of all or part of the business. On March 6, 2017, the bankrupt company filed for reorganization under Chapter 11. On March 16, 2017, the company announced that the sale had not been completed. On April 7, 2017, the Chapter 11 case was converted to Chapter 7 liquidation, and H. H. Gregg said it would close all 220 of its locations (the 88 stores previously announced to be closing, plus the other 132 locations) and lay off about 5,000 employees. All stores were closed permanently on May 25, 2017.

=== Sale of intellectual property ===
In June 2017, the H. H. Gregg brand and intellectual property was purchased by Valor Group LLC for $400,000. In August 2017, Valor Group LLC announced it would open an online business under the H. H. Gregg name. The online business operates out of Somerset, New Jersey.

The new online store named H. H. Gregg is not affiliated with the company that went out of business. Customers have been told to contact the manufacturer directly for any issues with malfunctioning products sold by the former company. Extended warranties sold by the former company are being serviced by Warrantech.

In 2019, Valor Group LLC opened its first H. H. Gregg storefront in Franklin Township, New Jersey. In 2022, however, it was reported that the store had shuttered.

== Fine Lines ==
Fine Lines was a division of H. H. Gregg that was introduced November 1, 2004. Each of its ten stores offered over 18,000 square feet (1,700 m^{2}) of premium lines of appliances. Products and brands varied by location. There were fourteen Fine Lines locations.

== Stock ==
H. H. Gregg had its initial public offering on July 20, 2007, at US$13.72 per share, and was traded on the New York Stock Exchange under the ticker symbol HGG.

In 2017, it was announced that the NYSE suspended trading of HGG in preparation for delisting. HGG shares were formally delisted on March 27, 2017, and became listed in OTC Pink.

== Sponsorship ==
In 2007, H. H. Gregg signed as one of 14 founding corporate partners for the Lucas Oil Stadium, home of the NFL's Indianapolis Colts. H. H. Gregg's deal earned them rights to advertise in the south gate and display many of their large, flat panel televisions. The south gate was also home to a new 26,000-square-foot (2,400 m^{2}) H. H. Gregg showroom.

From late 2016 until the company's closing, H. H. Gregg sponsored several drivers on the Andretti Autosport team. They sponsored Carlos Muñoz and Marco Andretti. They were slated to become the full-time sponsor of Andretti in 2017, and sponsored them at St. Petersburg. When the company closed, the team removed their logos on their cars, although the logo remained on the firesuits. When Takuma Sato won the 2017 Indianapolis 500, the company logos were still seen on the left breast of his firesuit though H. H. Gregg had closed three days prior to the race.
