= Nike and Off-White: 'The Ten' =

Sneakers collaboration between Nike and Off-White

"The Ten" (Nike and Off-White collaboration)
- Type: Sneakers
- Inventor: Nike and Off-White
- Inception: 2017; 9 years ago
- Manufacturer: Nike, from designs by Virgil Abloh

Nike and Off-White: "The Ten" was a sneakers collaboration between Nike and Off-White in 2017. It initially involved the deconstruction of ten iconic Nike silhouettes, designed by Founder and CEO of Off-White, Virgil Abloh. The ten shoes were individually broken down by Abloh, and then rebuilt with a different design and rearranged components. The collaboration sold out and the shoes became highly sought after. Further additions to this collaboration were then added throughout 2018 and 2019 which included endorsements from athletes and celebrities but are not included in the original "ten".

== Creation process ==
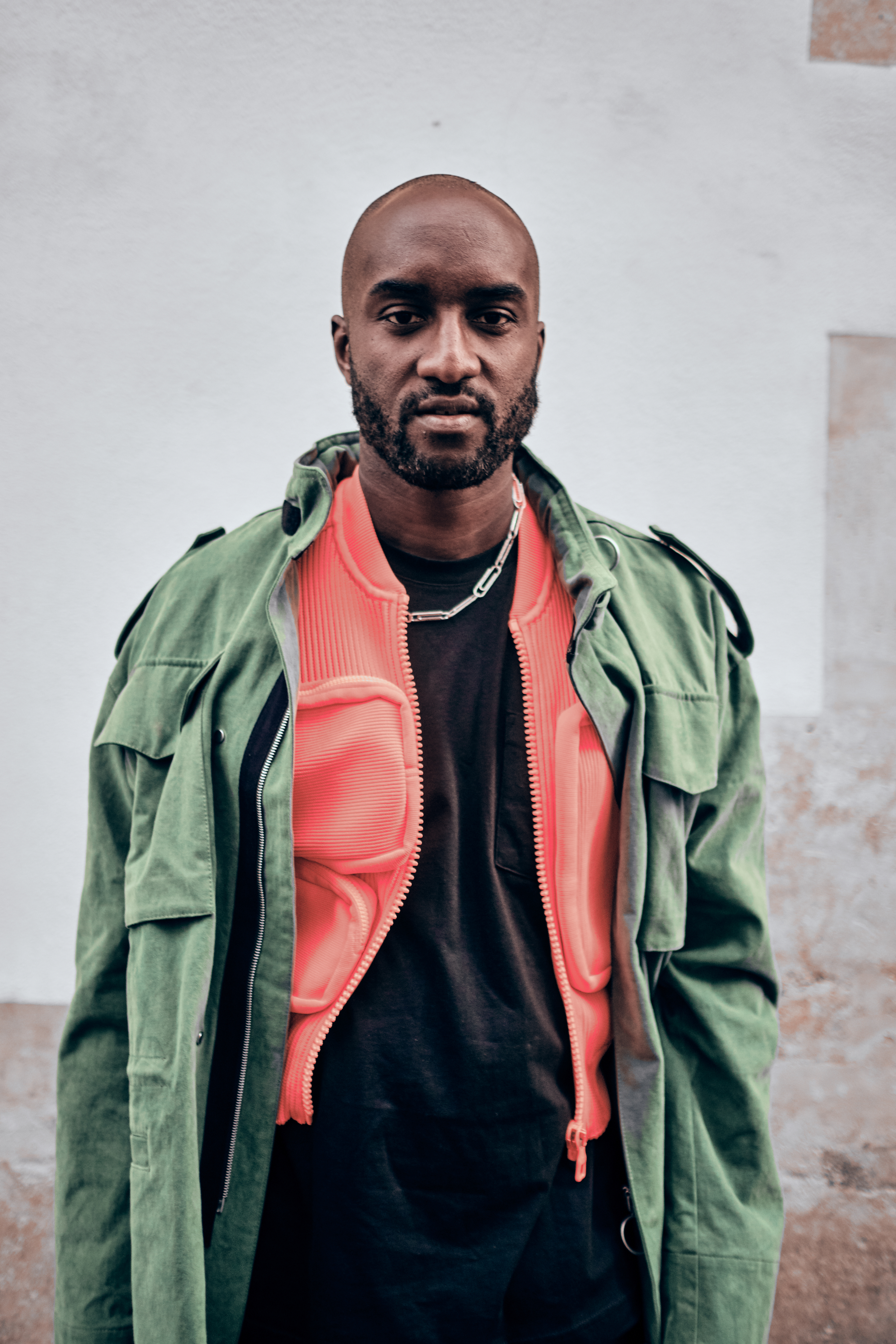
Founder and CEO of Off-White, Virgil Abloh, designer behind the collaboration between both companies

The ten Nike shoes were deconstructed and redesigned by Virgil Abloh throughout early 2017. The collaboration between the two brands was officially confirmed in late August, however Abloh had been working on the designs since much earlier in the year and teased them throughout. The design process involved Abloh taking each individual shoe, breaking it down with an X-ACTO knife, removing and altering key elements of the shoe. He maintained the foundational silhouette of each shoe, but added small fabrics and panels and relocated parts. Abloh concentrated his design towards editing the stitching and tongues of each of the shoes.

Abloh designed each shoe to have a print on the inside of each shoe, reflecting the creative process and location of creation. It was titled "Off-White for Nike" then a line which included the name of the shoe that had been remodelled and then two lines saying "Beaverton, Oregon USA" and "C. 2017". Beaverton, Oregon, being the location at which these shoes were designed. Abloh also added the name of the main material of the specific shoe to the midsole in bold black quotation marks, a signature trait of Off-White and Abloh. These examples include 'AIR' and 'FOAM'.

A key part of the creation process was adding the signature Off-White zip-tie that is attached to Off-White products. All the shoes in this collaboration featured the red zip-tie that features the date, name of collaboration and 'zip-tie' in bold white letters.

All the shoes in this collaboration had laces and the word "SHOELACES" was written in bold at the end of each shoelace. Every shoe came with multiple pairs of shoelaces and were different in colour.

Abloh created all the shoes in men's sizes. Except for the Air Force 1s, which were released in toddler sizes in the all black and volt colour-ways. Abloh added deconstructed versions of the Air Max 97, Blazer Mid and Waffle Racer in Women's sizes only.

During 2019, Abloh shared images from his 'Figures of Speech' exhibition at MCA Chicago, which included initial samples of Nike and Air Jordan shoes from this collaboration. It included remodelled versions of the Air Jordan IV, Nike Vaporfly and Air VaporMax.

== Deconstructed shoes ==
=== Air Force 1 ===
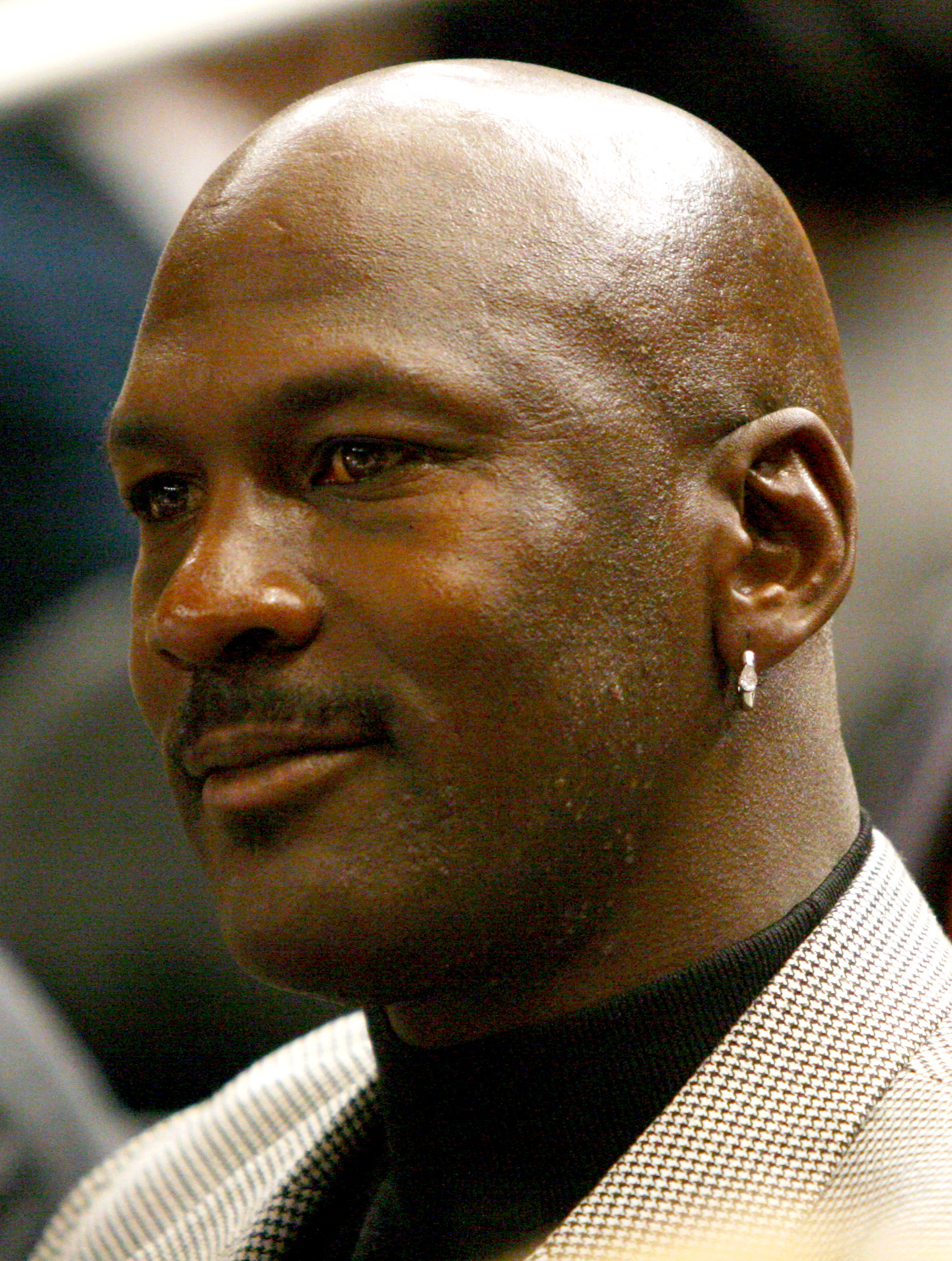
Michael Jordan personally endorsed the Air Jordan 1 reconstruction in this collaboration.

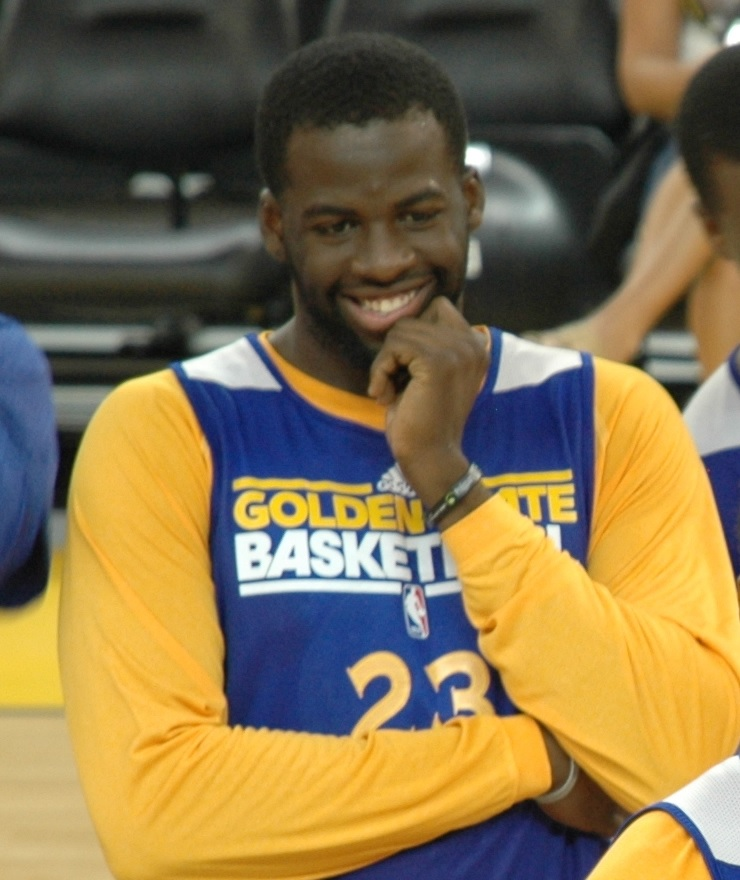
Golden State Warrior player Draymond Green wore the 'React Hyperdunk' shoes.

The Air Force 1 kept its original form and features, with the deconstruction occurring on the tongue and the laces. Abloh removed the signature Nike Swoosh logo that is placed on both the inner and outer section of the outside of the shoe and restitched in the same original place, showing all the stitches. It was originally released in the all white colour but was later re-released in an all volt and all black colour.

=== Air Jordan 1 ===
Abloh deconstructed the Air Jordan 1, the first shoe designed personally for Michael Jordan in 1984 by Nike. The Jordan brand is currently a subsidiary of Nike, thus Abloh was able to reconstruct the Air Jordan 1. The Air Jordan 1 can be found in many different colours but Abloh decided to use the Chicago colours that Michael Jordan played in, being white red and black. Abloh completely took apart the shoe and readjusted the key elements and placed them around the shoe. Abloh also designed an all-white Europe exclusive version of the shoe. Abloh later designed a light blue coloured edition of the shoe on June 23, 2018, containing the traditional University of North Carolina colours, a common colour used for Air Jordan shoes as it represents the university at which Michael Jordan attended. Michael Jordan, Bella Hadid, Drake, Naomi Campbell, Travis Scott, Odell Beckham Jr and Chris Brown were some of the celebrities who received personalised versions of this shoe before the global release. In June 2019 images were released of a yellow version that had initially been designed by Abloh but was never properly released and was confirmed as a sample.

=== Air Presto ===
The Air Presto was completely remodelled and had many of its key elements placed in different locations on the shoe. It also included the addition of a back strap for support. Abloh added another tongue on top of the original. The original colour was beige and black. It was remade in an all-white colour and an all black colour later in August 2018. The Air Presto collaboration initially given to friends and family and images of the shoes were posted on Instagram by New-York rapper ASAP Nast.

=== Air VaporMax ===
A recent addition to the Nike brand, the Air VaporMax was redesigned in a black colour-way with a beige coloured upper sole and 'AIR' along the air bubbles on the outside of the shoe. The shoe included a distressed tongue. Later an All black version added and all white version added.

=== Blazer Mid ===
The Blazer Mid was remodelled by using a different colour and deconstructing the tongue. It was initially released in the beige colour that had been used throughout the rest of the collaboration. In October 2018, an 'All Hallows Eve' version was released, in a vanilla and orange colour. It was accompanied by an all black 'Grim Reaper' edition of the shoe. This was known as the Halloween pack.

=== Air Max 97 ===
The Air Max 97 was redone 20 years after the first-ever release of the Nike Air Max 97 (First released in 1997). It featured an all white colour with a remodelled tongue and Nike tag with 'AIR' in bold black writing along the midsole. It was later released in an all grey 'Menta' colour which was exclusive in women's sizes. The shoe was also released in an all-black color as well.

=== Air Max 90 ===
The Air Max 90 was remodelled by using different fabrics on the lower, middle and upper sections of the shoe. The tongue was disfigured and a layer of foam was added below it. This was initially released in the original beige colour but was later released in an all black colour and a white color colour with a translucent sole.

=== Zoom Vaporfly SP ===
The ZoomVaporfly SP was deconstructed but maintained majority of its key elements and structure. It was designed in the original white colour but also included a translucent midsection and an orange undertone and included 'FOAM' in bold black writing along the midsole. This shoe was later released in an all black and a 'Tulip' pink colour.

=== Converse Chuck Taylor All Star ===
Converse is under the ownership of Nike, thus Abloh redesigned the iconic Chuck Taylor All Star. He added a clear midsection and 'LEFT' and 'RIGHT' in bold black letters placed at the top of the respective sides of the shoes. The shoe featured 'VULCANIZED' in bold black writing along the midsole of the shoe. This release was delayed to May 12, 2018 and was the last to release of original colours of 'The Ten'.

=== React Hyperdunk ===
The React Hyperdunk is a Nike basketball shoe. It was reconstructed with a translucent strap over the shoe and disfigured tongue. The shoe featured 'FOAM' in bold black writing along the midsole of the shoe. The shoes were debuted in public during the season opening NBA game by Golden State Warrior Draymond Green in October 2017.

== Release ==
The main release of the shoes was during October and November 2017, with the full release extending to May 2018. The ten shoes were split into two groups of five, named 'Ghosting' and 'Revealing'. The 'Ghosting' pack included the deconstructed versions of the Air Max 97, Converse Chuck Taylor, Air Force 1, React Hyperdunk and Zoom Vaporfly SP. The 'Revealing' pack contained the deconstructed editions of the Air Max 90, Blazer Mid, Air VaporMax, Air Presto and Air Jordan 1.

The main method of release for the shoes was raffles. Some shoes including the Air Presto and Air Jordan 1 were released early to celebrities. The Nike online store released them through a normal online release, but due to extreme traffic, they sold out in minutes.

All the shoes were released early to friends and family of Abloh and the Nike company, with many celebrities receiving personalised pairs of the shoes.

== Reception ==
The shoes sold out immediately on all platforms, including the Nike online. After the success of the shoes, Abloh and Nike decided to end the collaboration in December 2018. The shoes were reviewed by many, and were claimed to be the "Collaboration of the decade". The shoes have been resold for higher amounts than the original prices, with the Air Jordan 1 being sold for more than ten times the original price. Shoe resellers became banned and denied service from shoe stores over possible reselling of shoes. Abloh received the Footwear News Achievement Award for 'Shoe of the Year' in 2017 for the Air Jordan 1.

== Further additions ==
Attributed to the success of the initial release of 'The Ten', further collaborations were released. This included the addition of multiple colour-ways of the initial ten shoes. The Air Force One was remodelled exclusively for the ComplexCon event run by Complex. The ComplexCon exclusive was an all white iteration of the model and contained the signature Off-White location print on the inside of the shoe. The Air Force One was again remodelled in a collaboration with the Museum of Modern Art, an all black version with silver laces. In June 2019, a blue version was confirmed by Nike and Abloh in collaboration with the ICA museum in Boston and featured a baby-blue makeover of the shoe with a grey Nike Swoosh. In 2022, a green version was released in collaboration with the Brooklyn Museum.

Another addition to the collaboration was a complete soccer themed release in light of the Football World Cup. It involved a reconstruction of the ZoomFly Mercurial Flyknit in both an all black and all orange. This was released on June 14, 2018. It also included a full tracksuit top and bottoms as well as an orange Nike soccer ball. Abloh also designed orange Mercurial soccer boots. They were debuted to the public in March 2018 by French professional football player Kylian Mbappé.

American professional tennis player Serena Williams, who has a sponsorship deal with Nike, had her own personal addition to this collaboration which included her own tennis shoes and tennis wear. It included a ‘Queen’ version of the Blazer and Air Max 97. The clothing line included day and nighttime dresses, a bomber jacket, a bag, the NikeCourt Flare 2. Serena was also gifted a personalised version of the all-blue version of the Air Force 1.

In 2019, The Nike Waffle racer was deconstructed and added to this collaboration with no official release date. With a three-sneaker women's Waffle Racer pack, the range is expected to include "Black/Fuchsia/White," "White/Electric Green/Black," and "Vivid Sky/Black/Electric Green" colours.

Abloh also designed three versions of the Nike Terra Kiger 5, to be released in 2019.
