= Gadzooks (retailer) =

American teen-clothing retail chain

Gadzooks, Inc.
- Commonly used logo

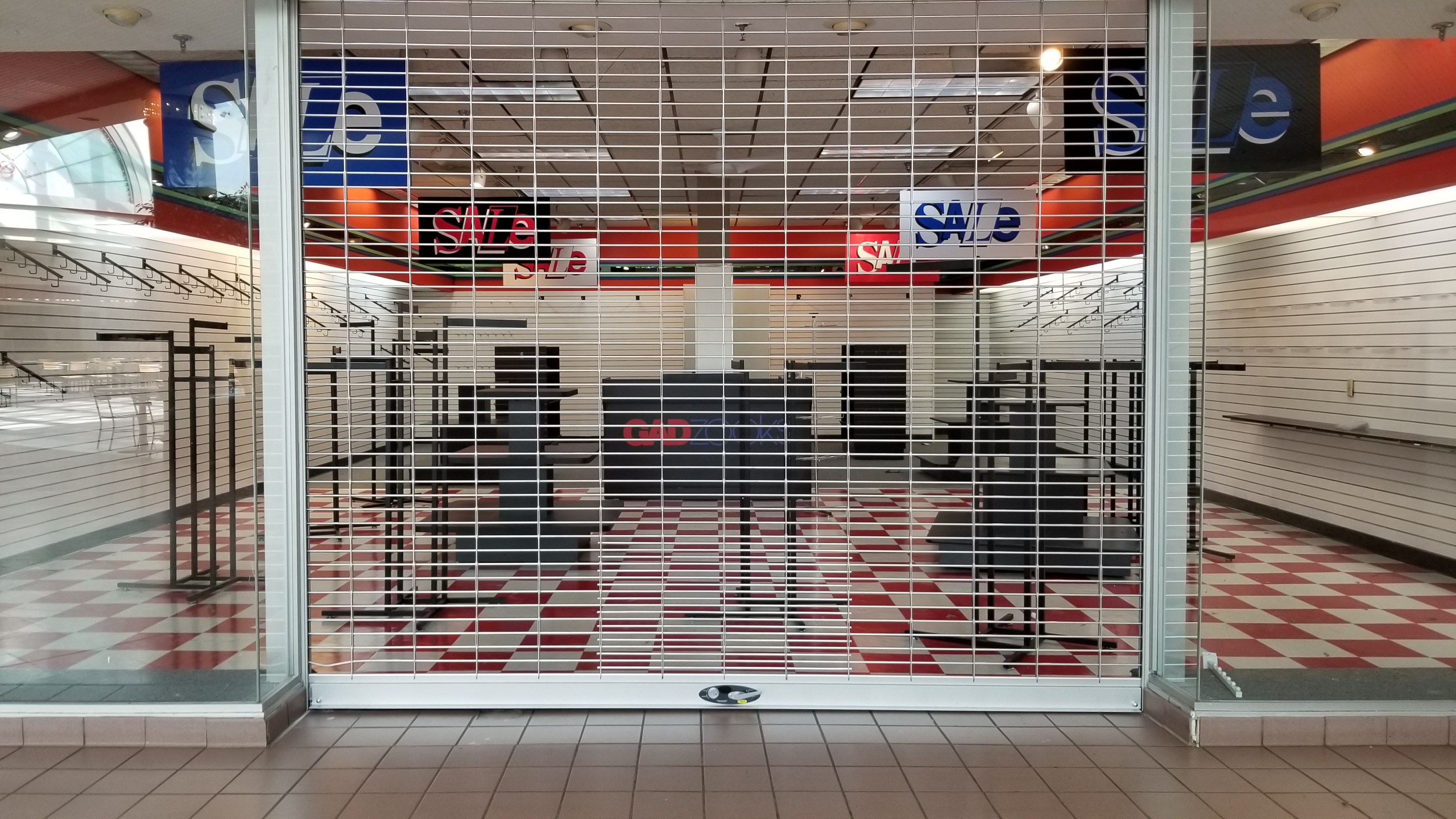
- A Gadzooks store reconstructed for the set of Fear Street Part One: 1994 at the North DeKalb Mall in Atlanta
- Founded: 1983; 43 years ago
- Founder: Jerry Szczepanski; Larry Titus
- Defunct: March 17, 2005; 21 years ago
- Fate: Acquired by Forever 21 and shut down
- Headquarters: Carrollton, Texas

Gadzooks, Inc. was a mall-based teenage clothing retailer. It was acquired by Forever 21 in 2005 and then shut down. Gadzooks stores had a life-size version of part of a Volkswagen Beetle inside. Dozens of the cars were sawed in half for use as displays throughout its locations during the 1990s.

== History ==
The company was founded in 1983 as a T-shirt business by brothers-in-law Jerry Szczepanski and Larry Titus, and inspired by the shopping habits of Szczepanski's teenage sons. The first store was in Mesquite, Texas. In order to fill floorspace, the founders displayed an "old, white Volks-wagen bug" in the store.

By 1992, the company had 33 stores in Texas. In 1995, the company became a public company via an initial public offering and within three months, the share price quadrupled from $15 to $61. That year the company had 195 stores. In 2000, the company operated 330 Gadzooks in 35 states.

In 2003, in response to heightened competition, the company retooled, shifting from being a "mini-department store", and dropping its male clothing line, to focus exclusively on 16- to 22-year-old females, which proved a fatal shift in its viability. Gadzooks was one of the first national retail chains to adopt the teenage shopper as its target market.

In February 2004, the company filed bankruptcy and announced plans to reduce its store count from 410 to 252. In March 2005, Forever 21 purchased the chain for $33 million. The stores were eventually phased out.

In 2019, Forever 21, the successor to Gadzooks, filed for Chapter 11 bankruptcy. On March 3, 2025, Forever 21 filed for Chapter 11 bankruptcy for the second time in 6 years, blaming decreasing mall traffic and competitors such as Temu and Shein as factors contributing to the filing. Forever 21 conducted liquidation sales at all of its US stores that same day, noting that it was unable to find a buyer, leading to the company's 350 remaining locations in the US being permanently closed.
