= Justice (store) =

American clothing brand

- Type: Subsidiary
- Industry: Retail
- Founded: 2004; 22 years ago
- Headquarters: Columbus, Ohio, U.S.
- Brands: Justice
- Parent: Tween Brands, Inc. (2004–2009); Dress Barn (2009–2011); Ascena Retail Group (2011–2022); Bluestar Alliance LLC (2020–present)

Justice is a former retail clothing store. It now sells its products exclusively through Walmart, targeting the tween girl market. In 2020, it became a brand owned by the private equity firm Bluestar Alliance.

Justice makes apparel, underwear, sleepwear, swimwear, lifestyle, accessories, and personal care products for girls age roughly 6–12. Justice began with operating retail stores between the late 1980s and the late 2010s. It began as Limited Too becoming Justice during 2008 to 2010.

Justice also makes licensed merchandise from popular franchises, which have in the past included iCarly, Victorious, Wizards of Waverly Place, and Liv and Maddie.

Justice makes girls size 6 through size 20, as well as plus sizes for size 10–24. Plus sized dresses, tops and jackets are also available.

The brand was purchased by Bluestar Alliance in 2020. Justice began being sold exclusively at Walmart the next year. Justice products are also available for purchase through Walmart online. Since August 2021, Walmart Canada began carrying Justice line.

== History ==
Former Tween Brands corporate logo, 2006–2009

Limited Too was created by The Limited, Inc. in 1987 as a younger girls/infants version of The Limited. In 1996, a new senior management team refocused Limited Too into a preteen girls' fashion store. In 1999, Limited Too, Inc. spun off to establish a strong and independent brand identity.

From 2001 to 2003 the company operated the Mishmash chain that targeted 15- to 20-year-old women and sold apparel, accessories, and gifts and competed head-to-head with chains like Gadzooks, Wet Seal, and the women's businesses of Abercrombie & Fitch, Hollister Co., and American Eagle Outfitters. The chain folded in 2003 and in January 2004, Too Inc. launched the first Justice: Just for Girls stores; many of the early Justice stores were in converted Mishmash stores.

On July 10, 2006, Too Inc. completed its name change to Tween Brands, Inc., and began trading on the NYSE under the symbol, 'TWB'.

On June 25, 2009, Dress Barn announced that it would buy Tween Brands, Inc, in a friendly acquisition. In 2010, Tween Brands began a boys clothing line entitled “Brothers”.

On January 1, 2011, Dress Barn completed its reorganization into Ascena Retail Group, Inc. trading on the NASDAQ under the stock ticker symbol ASNA.

The Justice brand outsold the much larger Walmart and Target stores in the girls' apparel category during the fourth quarter of 2011 and the first quarter of 2012.

On February 17, 2015, Ascena Retail Group, Inc. announced that the Brothers brand would be discontinued due to poor sales and recognition. Justice later added more product lines in response to changing consumer tastes, including Justice Active inspired by athleisure trends, with products endorsed by Mackenzie Ziegler, as well as JoJo Siwa clothing and accessories.

In 2018, Justice launched an original series of graphic novels and toys called Ultra Squad designed to be empowering to tween girls; the book series was well received and is currently on its fourth volume.

In July 2020, in the midst of the COVID-19 outbreak, Ascena Retail Group declared Chapter 11 bankruptcy, and stated that a 'significant number' of Justice stores would close permanently. Later on, it was announced that all remaining Justice stores were to be closed permanently by the end of 2020, and that Ascena Retail Group was exploring a possible sale of the Justice brand with potential suitors, the brand said it would continue to sell apparel through its digital format.

On November 11, 2020, Ascena Retail Group announced that the Justice brand had been acquired by Bluestar Alliance LLC.

In 2021, Justice began being sold exclusively at Walmart. Justice products are also available for purchase through Walmart online and the Justice brand digital store. They also made a deal with Nogin, who planned to re-transform Justice's e-commerce platform to reduce shipping costs and add AI-generated content to its website. However, in December 2023, Nogin declared Chapter 11 bankruptcy, blaming some of its retail partners that required Nogin to purchase their inventory. Justice's inventory, in particular, affected Nogin with larger amounts of older inventory and drained the company's cash.

== Criticism ==
Justice was examined in the study “’Putting on’ Sexiness: A Content Analysis of the Presence of Sexualizing Characteristics in Girls' Clothing”. A total of 650 clothing pieces were analyzed into four groups defined as childish, sexual, both childish and sexual and neither childish nor sexual. Of the clothing documented, 413 pieces or 63.5% of the clothing was defined as childish, 12 pieces or 1.8% of the clothing was defined as sexual, and 225 pieces or 34.6% of the clothing was considered both childish and sexual. No clothing from Justice was considered neither childish nor sexual.
