= Asspizza =

American fashion designer and artist from New York

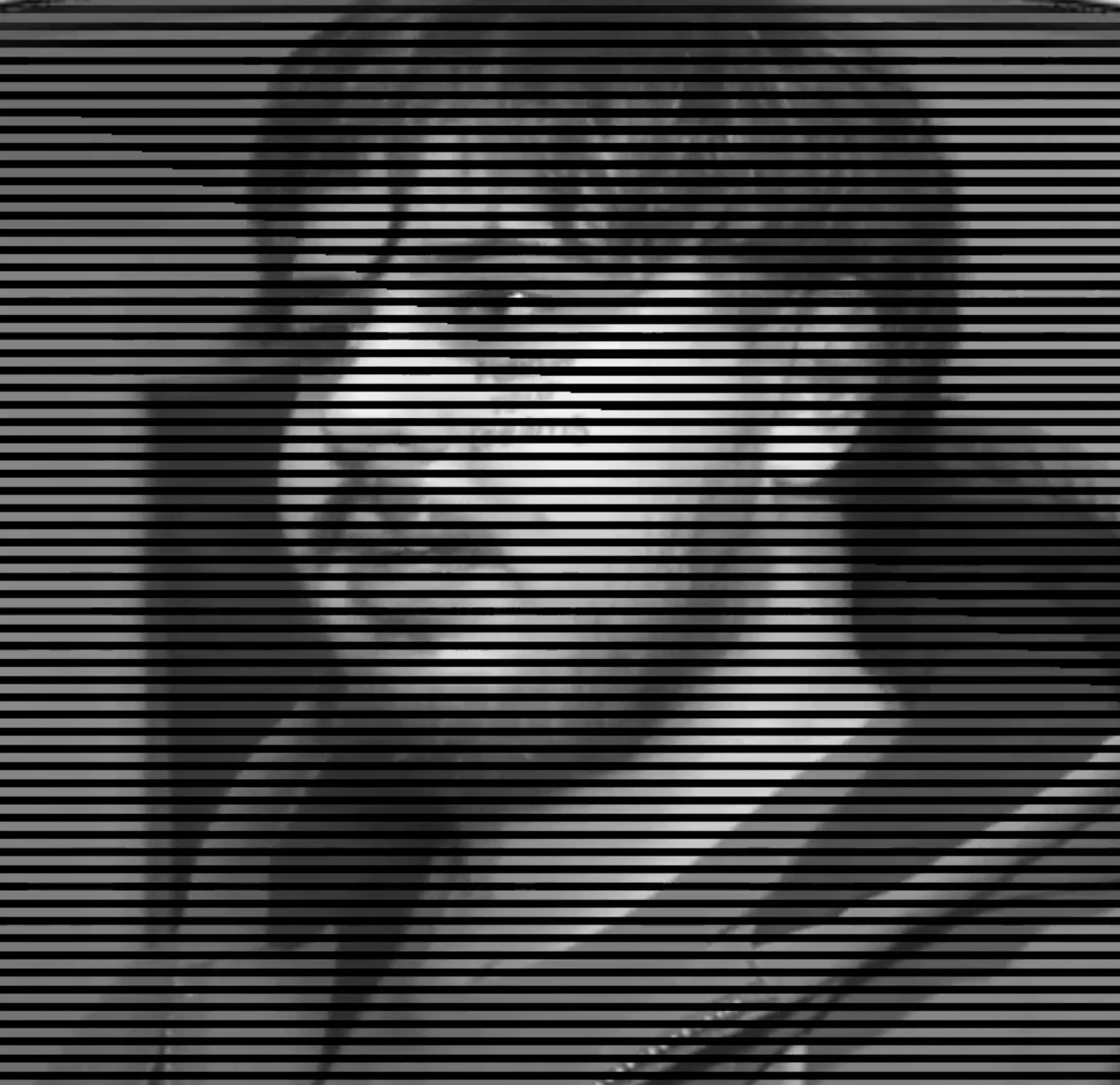
- Babbitt in January 2022
- Born: Austin Babbitt; June 5, 1998 (age 28); Queens, New York, U.S.
- Other name: "Austin Butts" "Pizza"
- Occupation: Fashion designer, blogger, artist, and internet celebrity
- Years active: 2013–present
- Known for: Asspizza
- Website: asspizza.com

Austin Babbitt (born June 5, 1998), known by the alias Asspizza is an American fashion designer, artist, and internet celebrity best known for his eponymous clothing line.

His work has been recognized by Kanye West, Lorde, Wiz Khalifa, Ty Dolla $ign, A$AP Mob, Yung Lean, and the New York-based streetwear brand Supreme. Kanye West premiered bootleg "Pablo" clothing made by Babbitt to honor his album release, selling the collection in his first "Pablo" pop-up shop in New York City alongside his genuine merchandise.

== Early life ==
Babbitt's career began with an interest in graffiti artwork at a young age, along with shopping at local thrift shops for low price clothing in order for him to customize and wear. He has stated being from New York was a major factor in his early career and creative interests.

In 2014, Babbitt dropped out of high school.

== Career ==
=== 2014–2016: Spaghetti Boys and Early Soho ===
Babbitt's start in the fashion industry began while spending time with other fashion focused and art obsessed kids along an area of Soho formerly known as the 'clout corridor', between Mercer and Howard, and included stores such as Supreme, VFiles, Off-White, and NikeLab 21M in early 2014. It was here that he met other likeminded teens, including Ray Martinez, Luka Sabbat, and Kerwin Frost. In November 2014, Babbit and his friends appeared in Lorde's music video for "Yellow Flicker Beat" of The Hunger Games: Mockingjay - Part 1 soundtrack following a brief conversation between them on Instagram.

In 2015, Frost founded the Spaghetti Boys, a collective of artists, DJs and content creators, alongside Ray Martinez. Babbitt not long after became one of the main members alongside Martinez and Frost, with other teens in Soho contributing including future rapper Sheck Wes and filmmaker WhiteTrashTyler. The Spaghetti Boys collective released fashion collaborations with Off-White and Heron Preston, as well as promotional material for Nike Air.

On December 22, 2015, Babbitt and Frost went viral for fighting rapper Playboi Carti, with video surfacing on social media showing the three arguing over apparent disrespect shown to the fashion designer Ian Connor (who narrates the video) by Babbitt in a former magazine interview.

In 2018, the Spaghetti Boys held a pop-up shop in Tokyo at the Japanese boutique NUBIAN. This would end up being their last official collaboration.

In late 2018, the Spaghetti Boys disbanded and began focusing on new solo projects.

=== 2014–present: Asspizza ===
Babbitt's personal career began while still part of Spaghetti Boys, drawing over and sewing patches onto streetwear fashion garments from well known brands. These actions regularly went viral, causing fans of the notable brands to express backlash towards Babbitt online; while at the same time beginning to further his fame and influence with young adults and teens on social media websites.

He told The Fader in 2014, "I just wake up and see all the clothes that are spread out on my floor and I say, 'Oh, I'll just wear the same jeans as everyday and I'll wear a random T-shirt.' And then people are like 'Whoa, you're an icon.' And I say 'No, I'm not.'"

In 2016 he relocated to Winchester, UK to work on "Collection 1", his first official collection of clothing from his brand. While in the UK, he worked on a Blu-ray movie documenting the making of Collection 1 and created skits directed by Danny Dangle and WhiteTrashTyler.

In 2016, approaching the release of The Life of Pablo, Kanye West began premiering pop-up shops with his "Pablo" merch line being sold. Babbitt began producing mock-ups of these designs on low-cost t-shirts; selling them outside the stores for twenty dollars. Kanye's creative team, including Virgil Abloh and Heron Preston, spotted the bootleg merch and liked it so much that it was decided to be put inside the actual pop-up stores alongside the genuine album branded t-shirts, hoodies, hats and jackets, with Babbitt saying at the time "A lot of people just don’t get it because like they’re like, 'Why the fuck would you buy a fake shirt?’ But it's more real than the real ones, you know?”

In early 2019, Babbitt moved to a basement in Lexington, KY with his close friend Tyler Webb (known professionally as KentuckyBoyTyler) to work on his brand Asspizza and focus on fulfilling online clothing orders, due to order fulfillment being a common complaint among fans of Babbitt. Describing it as a "painful time" due to the immense number of orders, Asspizza in 2019 began selling clothing in limited and capped quantities on his self-named website to help free himself from the backlog of unshipped clothing.

Asspizza opened up an official office and studio named "730 Studios" in April 2021 in Los Angeles, CA. It includes offices, a recording studio, and areas for art and clothing to be made.

A typical Asspizza branded t-shirt with associated iconography.

Though not officially announced by Supreme, Babbitt through his brand Asspizza collaborated with the famous New York clothing brand in April 2021. Inspired by his early work from 2015, the collaborative t-shirt features a tri-colored Triple Box Logo design (a logo synonymous with Supreme and design synonymous with Asspizza) printed on the chest, while the backside incorporates Babbitt's scribble face design and the year 2021. After announcing the collaboration, Babbitt began going around New York City and Los Angeles hand-delivering the tees to people. The item was not available for sale anywhere online or in-store, leading some to question its authenticity.

In 2021, Babbitt embarked on an impromptu tour of the United States in his car. He was accompanied by his friend and designer KentuckyBoyTyler and rapper Hazey. The tour started in early 2021 and was set up in local parking lots; Babbitt would post his location on social media and roll out yards of white denim for fans to come and paint, with the intention of making clothing from the tarnished denim. These locations are where Asspizza handed out his collaboration t-shirts with Supreme and also other rare clothing items to fans.

Announced in June 2022, Babbitt under his Asspizza brand, opened his first official art gallery in New York City. Located at 481 Broadway and entitled "ARTIST OF THE WORLD", the gallery featured art pieces produced by Asspizza (including embroidered canvas made to look like spray paint), live music, tattoo artists, and exclusive merchandise from his brand throughout the month. The gallery was stated by Babbitt to be one of a kind, with signs stating "PLEASE TOUCH THE ARTWORK", along with the exhibits changing daily so people could constantly revisit.

Babbitt has stated all of his clothing items are handmade, and each individual item can take upwards of 75 minutes to complete.

Typical iconography of Babbitt's brand include the number 730, jack-o'-lanterns and pumpkins, the star logo from the fast food brand Carl's Jr, the phrase Nothing Matters, and a scribble face design somewhat resembling Daniel Johnston's alien on the cover of the album Hi, How Are You.

== Personal life ==
Babbitt has stated he believes in Magicka, Spiritualism, The Law of Attraction, and Positive Thinking.

Babbitt says he abstains from all drugs and has never drunk alcohol.
