= Kerwin Frost =

American DJ, entertainer, and comedian from New York

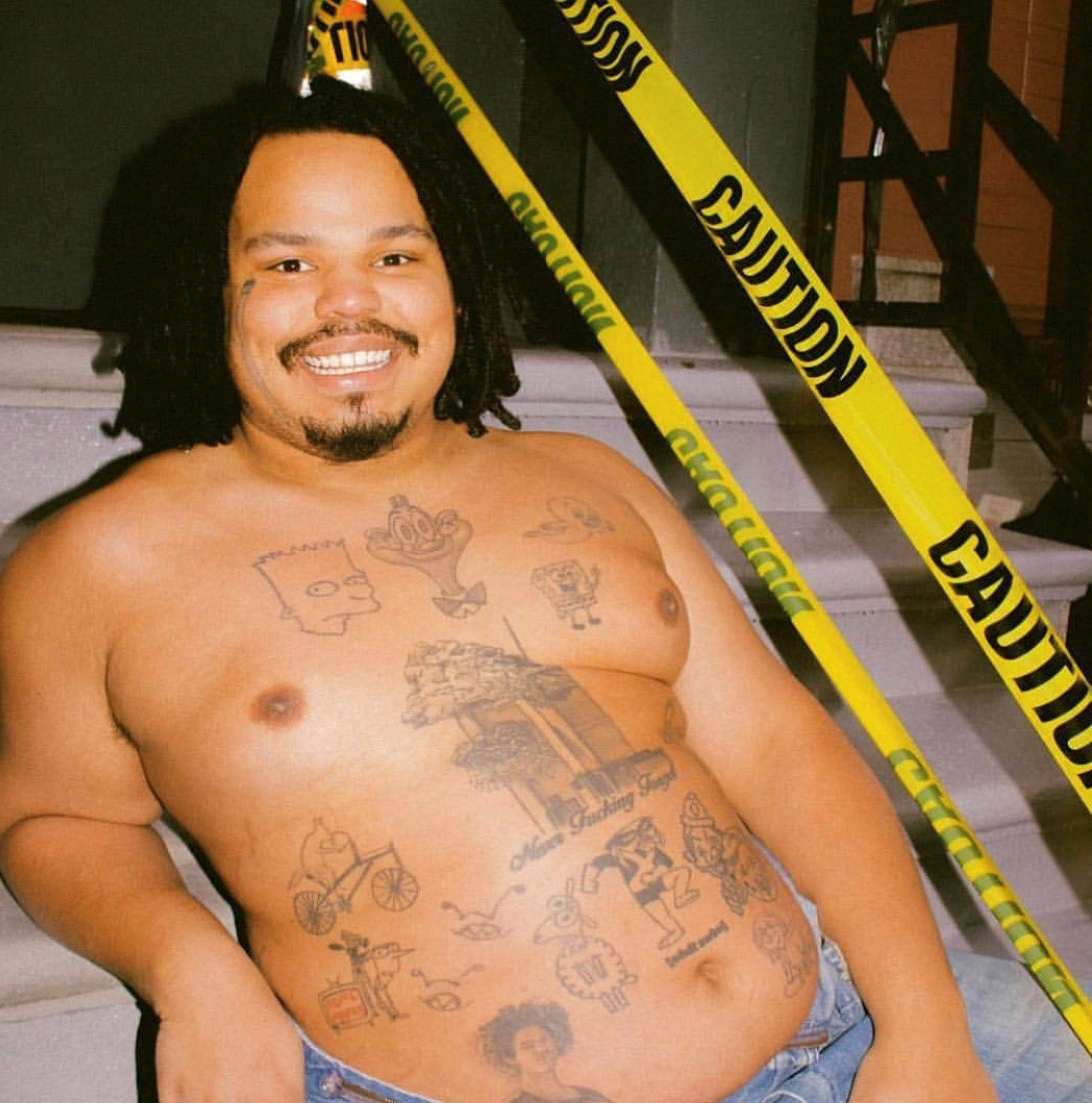
- Born: July 26, 1995 (age 31); Harlem, New York, NY, United States
- Occupations: Internet personality, DJ, talk show host
- Years active: 2015–present
- Spouse: Erin Yogasundram (2017–2022)
- Children: 2
- Website: https://www.mrkerwinfrost.com/

Kerwin Frost (born July 26, 1995) is an American entertainer, DJ, talk show host, and comedian. He first rose to prominence in New York City's Soho Youth streetwear scene.

== Early life ==
Frost was raised in public housing in Harlem. He became interested in fashion and music at a young age. He was first introduced to thrifting by his father as an economic necessity, due to the family's low income. Purchasing second-hand clothes later became a cornerstone of Frost's style, finding designer clothes at Goodwill, and trading them with his friends. At the age of 14 he got his first tattoo, a distinctive pencil design that runs the entire length of his right cheek. Frost attended Martin Luther King Jr. High School and dropped out at the age of 16.

== Career ==
=== 2015–2018: Soho Youth Streetwear Culture and the Spaghetti Boys ===
At 15, Frost began spending time with other fashion-obsessed kids in an area of Soho known as the ‘clout corridor’, between Mercer and Howard Street, which included streetwear stores such as Supreme, VFiles, Off-White, NikeLab 21M. It was here that he met future collaborators including Mike the Ruler, Luka Sabbat, and Austin Babbitt. To make money to purchase clothes, Frost would wait for hours in the Supreme line the night before major drops, and would then resell the clothes at a premium to tourists. When he was 16, he interned at VFiles. During this time, he made the decision to immerse himself in the fashion world, rather than be a fashion writer, something he had been contemplating.

In 2015, Frost founded the Spaghetti Boys, a collective of artists, DJs, and content creators, alongside Ray Martinez. The two met at the Harlem public housing development they both lived in. That year, the Spaghetti Boys released fashion collaborations with Off-White and Heron Preston, as well as promotional material for Nike Air. The collective regularly hosted free all-ages parties at venues across the city such as Milk Studios and Overthrow Boxing Gym. Honorary members of the Spaghetti Boys included Austin Babbitt, Sheck Wes, White Trash Tyler, among others. In late 2018, the Spaghetti Boys disbanded and Frost began focusing on new projects.

=== 2018–present: Entertainment career ===
Frost has garnered attention for producing viral video content and securing unplanned interviews with recognized pop culture celebrities. In 2018, he worked with Kanye West to create three video content pieces for West: West's Wyoming listening party, his Kids See Ghosts listening party, and the Kardashian-Jenner-West Christmas Party. Frost has also created and hosted a street trivia series for Cash App.

In November 2019, he was part of the lineup at Post Malone’s Posty Fest.

==== Kerwin Frost Talks ====
In March 2019, Frost launched the first season of his self-produced and distributed talk show, Kerwin Frost Talks. In each episode he interviews well-known figures from the worlds of music and fashion.” The interviews are often filmed in the guest's house. The first season consisted of fifteen episodes, and featured guests including Lil Yachty, SZA, Dev Hynes, Luka Sabbat, Jeremy Scott, the founders of Hood by Air, Tyler the Creator, and Chief Keef. ASAP Rocky gave Frost his first interview following his highly publicized stint in a Swedish jail. Lil Yachty broke the news on his episode of KFT that he wrote "Act Up" for City Girls.

==== Film and acting ====
In 2019, Frost hosted the first of what he planned to be an annual film festival in New York. Seventeen films were shown over three days, and the festival included a panel with film producers the Safdie Brothers, a Q&A session led by music video producer Cole Bennett, and an appearance by Robert Pattinson. In the same year, Frost appeared in the Safdies' film Uncut Gems as himself.

==== Adidas partnership ====
In 2019, Frost became Adidas' newest creator, responsible for designing clothing, sneakers, and ad campaigns for the brand. In January 2020, he announced a longer-term partnership with the brand, which includes him designing clothing, footwear and ad campaigns. In an interview with GQ, Frost mentions that he has wanted to work for Adidas for a long time. To date, he has developed limited edition cassette tapes for the brand, featured in their Superstar shoe campaign, and is expected to create a suite of apparel this year that leans heavily into his aesthetic and is inspired by costume.

=== Other ventures ===
In 2023, Frost collaborated with McDonald's to redesign their McNugget Buddies, a set of 1990s-era McDonaldland characters, for a limited-edition series of adult Happy Meals. This is the second series of adult happy meal toys with the first being created in 2022 by Cactus Plant Flea Market, another fashion brand.

== Style ==
Frost is a street style influencer, known for his combining of haute couture and streetwear fashions, often thrifted. He has been connected to popular streetwear brands including Palm Angels, Moncler, Off-White, Yeezy, and has a multi-year partnership with Adidas. His fashion choices have garnered media attention. Frost donning a Hood by Air tent has been described as a classic embodiment of a 2019 street style trend known as ‘peak maximalism’. At Paris Fashion Week 2019, he was featured in a Moncler x Craig Green coat that went viral. He also appeared at the Kim Jones Pre-fall 2019 collection and Dior FY19 show. His style has inspired positive reaction from artist Takashi Murakami and Teezo Touchdown.

== Personal life ==
Frost married his manager, Erin Yogasundram. In July 2019, they welcomed their first child, Waffl. Frost and Erin met over Instagram.

== Filmography ==
Kerwin Frost Talks - Season 1
| Episode | Title | Notes |
|---|---|---|
| 1 | Kerwin Frost Talks with Luka Sabbat | Released April, 2019 |
| 2 | Kerwin Frost Talks with Dev Hynes | Released April, 2019 |
| 3 | Kerwin Frost Talks with Lil Yachty | Released April, 2019 |
| 4 | Kerwin Frost Talks with Jeremy Scott | Released May, 2019 |
| 5 | Kerwin Frost Talks with Hood by Air ft Shayne Oliver and Ian Isiah | Released May, 2019 |
| 6 | Kerwin Frost Talks with A$AP Rocky and Ian Connor | Released June, 2019 |
| 7 | Kerwin Frost Talks with Luka Sabbat Part II | Released June, 2019 |
| 8 | Kerwin Frost Talks with Travis Barker | Released July, 2019 |
| 9 | Kerwin Frost Talks with Sza | Released August, 2019 |
| 10 | Kerwin Frost Talks with Diplo | Released August, 2019 |
| 11 | Kerwin Frost Talks to Post Malone | Released September, 2019 |
| 12 | Kerwin Frost Talks to Chief Keef | Released September, 2019 |
| 13 | Kerwin Frost Talks to Tyler, The Creator | Released December, 2019 |
| 14 | Kerwin Frost Talks with A$AP Rocky | Released January, 2020 |
| 15 | Kerwin Frost Talks to Yung Lean | Released April, 2020 |

Kerwin Frost Talks - Season 2
| Episode | Title | Notes |
|---|---|---|
| 1 | Kerwin Frost Talks to Mac Demarco | Released February, 2021 |
| 2 | Kerwin Frost Talks to John Mayer | Released March, 2021 |
| 3 | Kerwin Frost Talks to Jerry Lorenzo | Released April, 2021 |

As Himself
| Year | Title | Role |
|---|---|---|
| 2019 | Uncut Gems | Himself |
| 2019 | Kerwin Frost Presents the Kanye West Wyoming Ye Listening Party | Himself |
| 2019 | Kerwin Frost Presents the Kanye West & Kid Cudi Kids See Ghosts Listening Party | Himself |
| 2019 | Kerwin Frost Presents the 2018 Kardashian-Jenner-West Christmas Party | Himself |

== Discography ==
DJ Mixes
| Year | Title | Release details |
|---|---|---|
| 2019 | Memento Mori: Episode 6 | Released October 31, 2019 on the Weeknd's Beats 1 show Memento Mori |
| 2019 | Turn That Shift Off! Vol 1 | Released on SoundCloud |

Singles
| Year | Title | Release details |
|---|---|---|
| 2019 | 10K Cash Ft Matt Ox – Kerwin Frost Scratch That | Released on SoundCloud |

== Awards and nominations ==
Nominated by Dazed for its annual Dazed 100 list.

Nominated for Best in Fashion in the 11th Annual Shorty Awards.
