= Moved by the Motion =

Artist group

Moved by the Motion is a group of interdisciplinary artists who work with a spectrum of mediums including language, movement, image, and sound.

The Moved by the Motion group started in 2013. Membership is fluid, beginning as two or three people and now around seven or eight. Wu Tsang is a member of the group, referring to the arrangement as similar to a band. Opening in January 2022, Moved by the Motion installed an experiential sound installation at the San Francisco Museum of Modern Art that will remain up until June 2022. The members participating in the 2022 SFMOMA installation are: Asma Maroof, Tapiwa Svosve, Patrick Belaga, Fred Moten, Serpentwithfeet, Tosh Basco, Ahya Simone, Daniel Pineda, and David Quam. In 2022, it was announced that Moved by the Motion will participate in the 2022 Whitney Biennial curated by Adrienne Edwards and David Breslin.
