= Dolly Cohen =

French jewelry designer

Dolly Cohen is a jewellery designer based in Paris. She specializes in custom mouth jewellery and has created grill designs for Madonna, Rihanna, Rita Ora, Drake, and Cara Delevingne.

== Biography ==
Cohen worked as a dental technician before turning to grills around 2005. Cohen's grills are handmade to fit the teeth and jaw of the wearer. She makes the grills with chromium chromate. She makes a print and a plat, then sculpts a mold out of alginate. She uses yellow or white 18K gold. She takes one day to make one gold tooth and refuses to recreate oral jewellery she has made in the past. She maintains a laboratory in Paris' seventh arrondissement.

American rapper A$AP Rocky sought Cohen out after seeing one of her creations. She has created multiple grills for Rihanna. One of the grills she created for Rihanna featured a delicate lip ring.

During Givenchy's Fall/Winter 2015 show Cohen collaborated with Riccardo Tisci to create mouthpieces with vertical metal bars reminiscent of the mask worn by Hannibal Lecter in Silence of the Lambs. She also created grills for Hood By Air's Spring 2016 show.
