= Belaga =

Belaga may refer to:

- Belaga, Sarawak, town in Sarawak, island of Borneo, Malaysia
- Belaga District, Sarawak
- Belaga (state constituency), represented in the Sarawak State Legislative Assembly
- Belaga Airport, airport in Belaga, Sarawak
- Edward Belaga, Russian mathematician
- Julie Belaga (1930–2021), American politician
- Patrick Belaga (born 1991), American cellist and composer
- SS Belaga, a steamship
