= Banjee =

LGBT terminology

Banjee (as in: "banjee boy" or "banjee girl") is a term from ball culture describing a person embodying an urban, tough swagger. The term is mostly associated with New York City and may be Nuyorican in origin. (Note: "Bangee" and "Banjy" can be regarded as a misspellings rather than variant spellings based on the well-established use of "banjee" in print since at least the 1990 release of Paris Is Burning.) (Note: Tank tops, "wifebeaters" and other muscle shirts that show off a physique are a major part of banjee fashion (as demonstrated in promotional shots for the play Banjee, and the costumes worn between sex scenes in the porn movies in the genre). This style of shirt is seen to be a ubiquitous trapping of hip-hop culture and are arguably more popular among young gay men than they are in general, the banjee predilection for them makes sense.) Attitude, clothing, ethnicity, masculinity, physique, and youth are all elements of what has been called "banjee realness".

== History ==
According to The Village Voice, "banjee boy categories have been a part of vogue balls since at least the early 1980s". The 1990 documentary film Paris Is Burning featured "banjee realness" as one of the categories in which contestants competed for trophies.

Of his experience with the term, a gay black man writes:

Banjee. That was the identity I was given back in the summer of 1991, when I, half out/half in approached the colored museum of the Christopher Street piers. I was new to the life, so I had no reference for what people were talking about, but I soon gathered that "banjee" meant that I wasn't a "queen." Whatever the terms of identification, all I knew was that there was one thing that brought both the banjees and the queens (and whatever lies between) to the pier: we were men who loved men. An anxious 19 year old, I wore my banjee realness designation like a badge of honor. ... a queen schooled me on how my masculinity was something that carried great weight, not only in the gay world, but the straight world as well.

— Tim'm T. West

The word banjee never entered mainstream pop culture, but it had currency as gay slang throughout the 1990s. In 1997, author Emanuel Xavier coined and referenced the term in his debut poetry collection, Pier Queen. In 1998, a report in the medical journal AIDS Patient Care and STDs regarding safer sex practices among young Black and Latino men was entitled "Banjee Boys Are Down" (down, in this vernacular, meaning "supportive of it"), named for a project of Brooklyn's Unity Fellowship Church to get safer sex information to young men of color.

The 1999 play Banjee, written by playwright A.B. Lugo, presented at the Milagro Theater and Clemente Soto Vélez Cultural and Educational Center (and in another NYC venue in 2004), is "the story of Angel (played by Indio Meléndez), a straight homeboy, and Tony (played by Will Sierra), an admittedly bi banjee, who've known each other since childhood".

The term banjee has also been used by several producers of gay pornography in presenting the type of young man described herein. For example, in 1995, a company called Pleasure Productions produced a DVD called Banjee Black Boys (and five similarly named sequels) and c. 1999–2003, a company called Banjee Boy, Inc. produced films with taglines such as "Wanna see some of the sexiest, thugged out gangstas that NY has to offer?". There are other examples from adult films, as well as several pornographic websites (such as "Banjee Boy Group Slam") that still use the term.

While seeming to have peaked in popularity during the 1990s, the term banjee is still in use. For example, a 2003 web page for a restaurant in East Harlem describes its clientele as an "eclectic mix of patrons that range from pretty neighborhood Banjee boys to some of the wise guys that once populated the space formerly." In 2008, the band Hercules & Love Affair performed wearing matching shirts with the word printed on them. In the 2000s and 2010s, New York clothing label Hood By Air's designer Shayne Oliver used banjee culture as a general point of reference, and an LGBTQ+ clubnight in London in 2013, featuring a DJ named Borja Peña, called itself "Borja's Banjee Mix", referencing black masculinity. The 2018 period drama Pose, set in 1987's New York City Ball scene, has characters walk for the category "realness, bring it like a banjee boy" in episode 1x06 "Love is the Message", written by Ryan Murphy and Janet Mock.

== Related terms ==
Homo thug is a more recent and more popular term which is nearly synonymous with banjee. However, homo thug implies that the man in question is primarily homosexual. In contrast, a banjee might be bisexual or only have opportunistic homosexual sex with men when women are unavailable—a theme in many of the pornographic films that reference the term.

Gayngsta, a portmanteau derived from gay and gangsta, is another recent coinage. It has mostly been used in relation to the underground LGBT hip hop scene as shown in the documentary Pick Up the Mic and featured in the "Homorevolution Tour 2007" with these artists. While easily discernible in writing, pronunciation is barely discernible from gangsta. (Note: To pronounce gayngsta differently from gangsta, one has to either draw out the first syllable, accent it, create a stop after it, or take care to pronounce it as gay and the rest of the word as ngster. As all of these options run contrary to the flow of conversational English, it seems unlikely this term will see much use outside of writing.)

Banjee girl is rarely used, making it difficult to define. In discussing a fashion show in Paris, one reviewer wrote in 2005:

The low-rise skirt in denim is the first of its kind seen on the Paris runways. What is now clear to me is that no self-respecting Banjee Latina, or ghetto-fabulous "Shamecka-girl" or high rolling white chick will be ever able to resist its urban appeal.

Several examples of the use of the term banjee girl exist in the blogosphere, but it has rarely appeared in print or mass media. Exceptions include RuPaul's Billboard charting single "Back to My Roots", which includes the term in a list of hair fashions, an episode of the 2014 season of RuPaul's Drag Race, and Sharaya J, whose 2013 debut single was called "BANJI"; she also used the name for her production company when she split from Missy Elliott's label The Goldmind Inc. in 2016.

In the 1990 documentary film Paris is Burning, banjee girl and banjee boy were used in comparable frequency. Coupled with the film's focus on ball culture, an inextricably-connected transgender and drag subculture of 1980s New York City, this lends itself to a contextual definition of those performers impersonating females and attempting to exhibit the ultimately judged quality of holistic visual verisimilitude—"realness".

== See also ==
- African-American culture and sexual orientation
- Down-low (sexual slang)
- Vanessa Vanjie Mateo
