= Grill (jewelry) =

Type of jewelry worn on the teeth

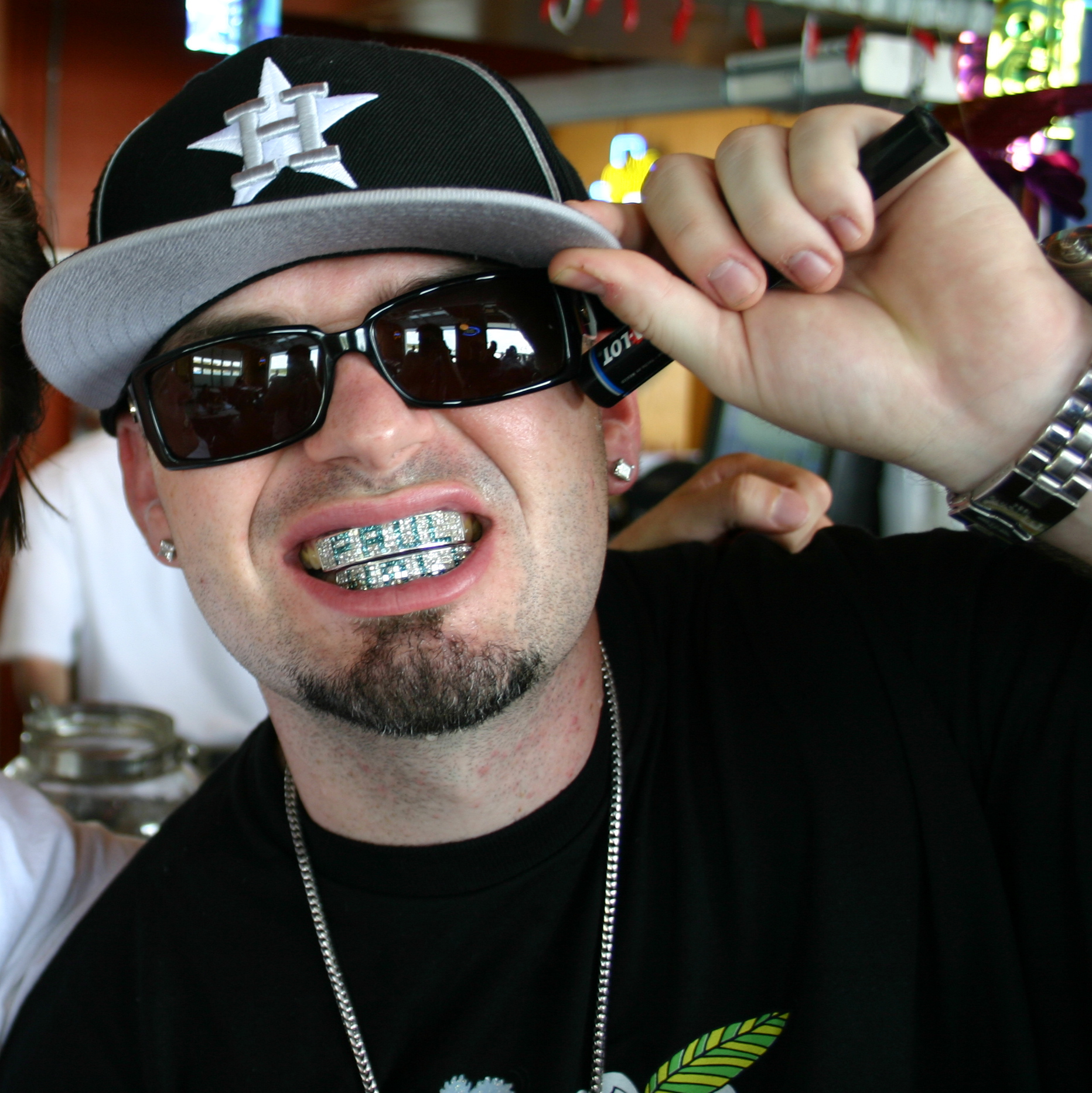
Paul Wall wearing his trademark grills. Some of Wall's grills cost nearly $30,000.

In pop culture, a grill (most commonly referred to as grills or grillz), also known as fronts or golds, is a type of dental jewelry worn over the teeth. Grills are made of metal and are generally removable but can also be permanent. They were initially popularized by hip hop artists in New York City in the early 1980s, and through the 1990s in Miami, Florida. They became even more popular during the mid-2000s due to the rise of Southern hip hop rap and the more mainstream pop culture status hip hop. Since then, grills have reached the mainstream; a "hard flex of both style and wealth, grills have always been a symbol of power and social status – right from its origins that can be traced back to over 4,000 years ago." Although grills have been around for over 4,000 years, the rise and fall of their popularity at different times in different countries is a reflection of fashion trends.

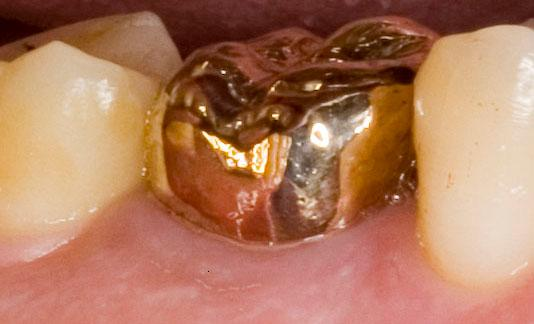
A gold crown

Grills can imitate and are not mutually exclusive with gold teeth, a form of permanent dental prosthesis in which the visible part of a tooth is replaced or capped with gold alloy.

== Characteristics ==
Grills are made of several types of metal (often silver, gold or platinum) that are sometimes inlaid with precious stones; they are generally removable, though some may be permanently attached to the teeth. Gold grills can be made from 10-karat, up to 24-karat gold. The gold can be tinted yellow, white and rose color.

Grills can potentially cost thousands of dollars, depending on the materials used and the number of teeth covered.

Grills received mainstream attention, including on network television, when, during the 2012 Summer Olympics, Olympic swimmer Ryan Lochte posed with a grill set with stones in the design of an American flag; he had recently worn diamond grills after earlier competitions.

== History ==
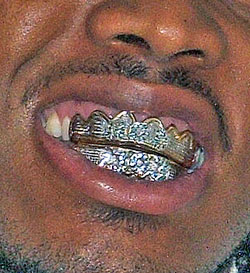
Dental grills inlaid with stones

Ancient Maya people and Etruscan women in Italy often decorated their teeth. The descendants of the Mayans from Mexico, Belize, Honduras, Guatemala, Nicaragua and El Salvador, continue to adorn their mouths with ornamentation to this day.

The insertion of gems into teeth predates hip hop culture. Hip hop artists such as Raheem the Dream and Kilo Ali began wearing grills in the early 1980s.

New York-based Eddie Plein, owner of Famous Eddie's Gold Teeth and Johnny Dang are often credited with kickstarting and expanding the trend. Plein began adapting dental crowns from single teeth into multiple caps thus creating the first grills originally known as fronts or caps. His first notable celebrity customer was Just-Ice who would popularize gold fronts by donning his custom teeth on the cover of his 1987 album Kool and Deadly photographed by Janette Beckman.

With grills popularity rising, Plein made gold caps for Flavor Flav, Big Daddy Kane and Kool G. Rap. He later moved to Atlanta, where he designed ever-more-elaborate grills for rappers such as OutKast, Goodie Mob, Ludacris, and Lil Jon.

Grills remained popular in the Southern U.S., especially in Miami, Tampa, Memphis and Atlanta even as they rose and fell from popularity elsewhere, and the rise of Dirty South rappers in the 2000s spurred a nationwide grill trend. During this time, grills frequently appeared in hip hop music, most notably in the 2005 number-one single "Grillz," by Nelly, Paul Wall, Big Gipp, and Ali, and in other Paul Wall songs. Wall is known for his grill business as well as his rapping; his clients include Kanye West and Cam'ron.

Grills maintained their popularity into the 2010s, with French grillmaker Dolly Cohen creating custom oral jewelry for Barbados singer Rihanna as well as Cara Delevingne and Rita Ora.

Custom grills maintained its popularity in the music industry, not just men but women, as well. Katy Perry, Beyoncé, Madonna, Miley Cyrus, Lady Gaga are notable among female popstar celebrities to have donned grills.

== Manufacture ==
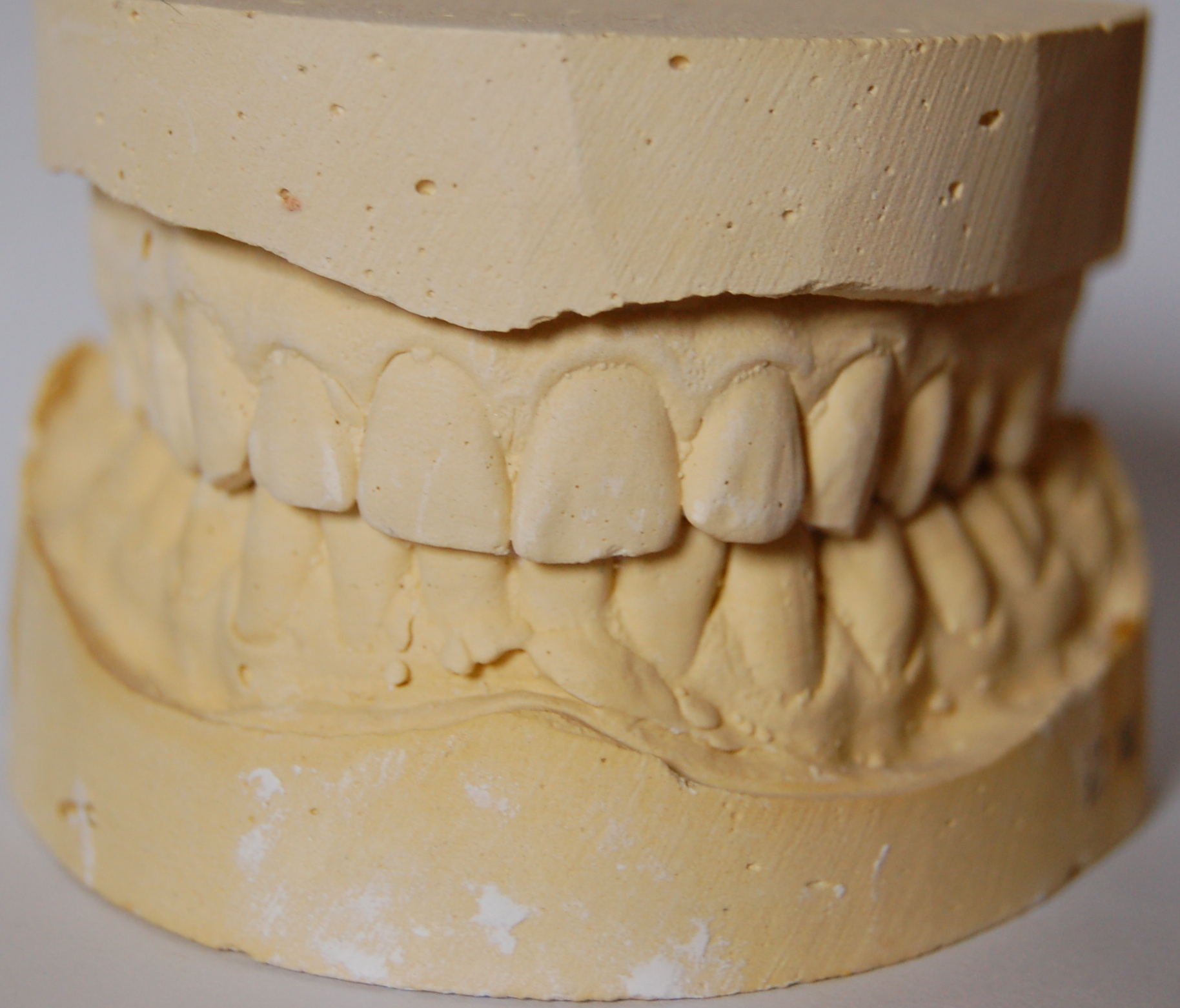
More expensive grills are shaped to fit custom dental castings like this one.

While early grills could not be removed easily and involved reshaping the tooth itself to fit the grill, grills today are made from custom dental molds. For more expensive grills, a dentist takes a mold of the wearer's front teeth with a quick set molding compound, such as silicone rubber or dental alginate. A tooth casting is obtained by filling the alginate or silicone rubber negative mold with a gypsum cement such as Buffstone, which is removed from the mold when set and used as a positive form on which to build a wax model that conforms exactly to the original set of teeth. The resulting wax model is cast in gold using the lost-wax process, then it's finished by hand, and precious stones, if any, are set into the metal. Some manufacturers take shortcuts from this difficult and expensive process, offering generic grills backed with a molding compound to make them fit the teeth, or use base metals like brass and nickel. Such grills may be less comfortable or dependable than grills that are professionally fitted. In several instances jewelers manufacturing grills from impressions they've made from their client's teeth have been charged with a felony: practicing dentistry without a license.

== Criticism and health hazards ==
According to the American Dental Association (ADA) in June 2006, no studies have shown wearing grills to be either safe or not. If the grills fit properly and are worn only intermittently, wearers are at a low risk for dental problems, according to the ADA. The ADA has warned, however, that grills made from base metals could cause irritation or allergic reactions, and that bacteria trapped under a grill worn on a long-term basis could result in gum disease, cavities, or even bone loss. School districts in Alabama, Georgia, and Texas have banned grills for reasons both disciplinary and health-related.

== See also ==
- Bling bling
- Ohaguro
