= Palm Angels =

Italian luxury fashion label

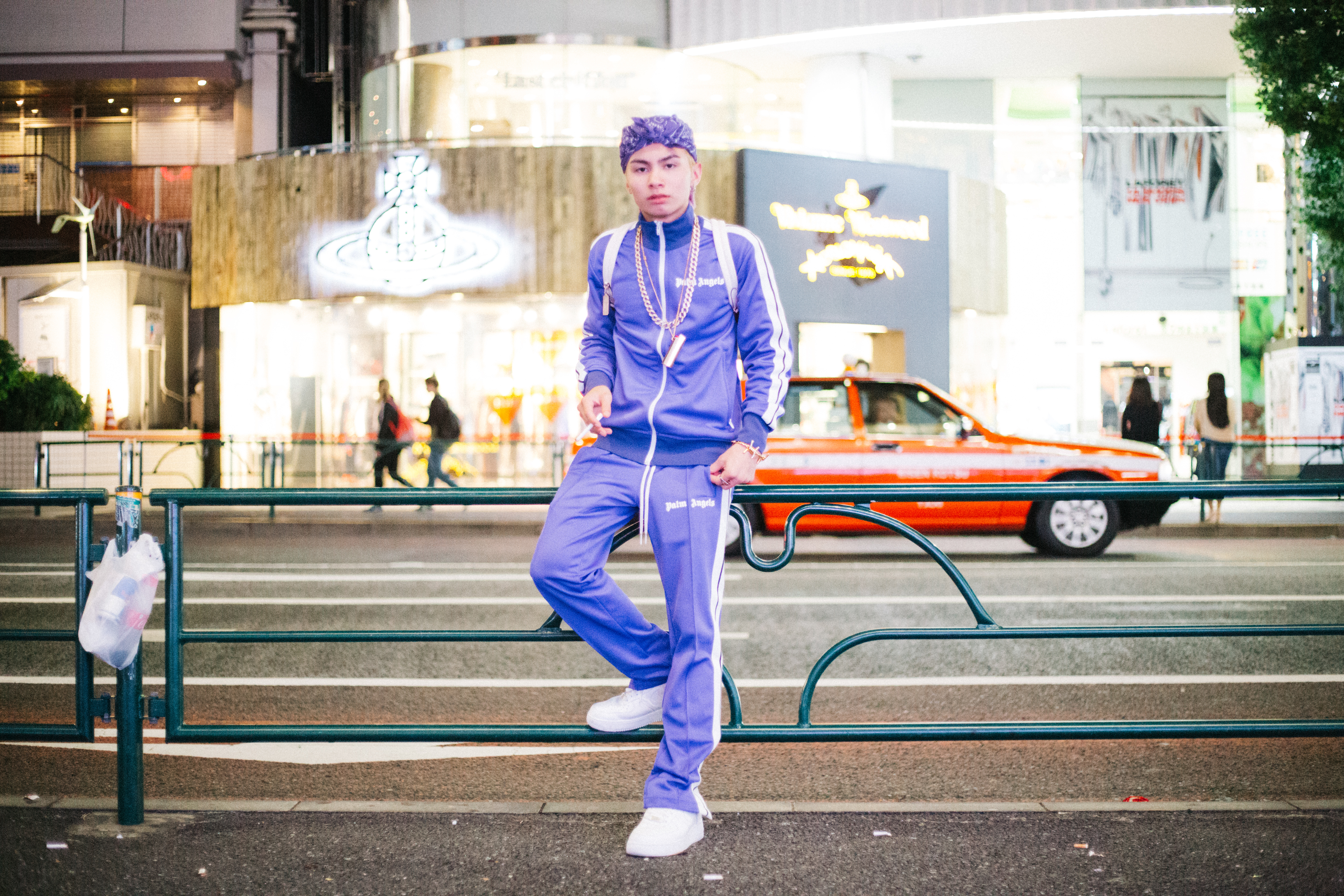
- Type: Società a responsabilità limitata
- Industry: Fashion
- Founded: 2015; 10 years ago in Milan, Italy
- Founder: Francesco Ragazzi
- Headquarters: Milan, Italy
- Area served: Worldwide
- Products: Clothing, shoes, accessories
- Parent: Bluestar Alliance LLC
- Website: www.palmangels.com

Palm Angels is an Italian luxury fashion label founded in 2015 by Italian fashion designer and photographer, Francesco Ragazzi who is also the former artistic director of Moncler. Palm Angels is part of the New Guards Group and has collaborated with brands such as Moncler Genius, Playboi Carti, BBC Ice Cream, Under Armour & Clarks.

== History ==
The book, published by Rizzoli, features a collection of black and white photographs of the L.A. skateboarding scene, shot by Ragazzi and an introduction written by Pharrell Williams. The launch took place in Paris at the former concept store named Colette.

This led to the creations of a brand where the fascination for American culture merges with the Italian perspective, inspiring collections composed of deconstructed and comfortable shapes with unexpected sartorial details. The release of the book in 2014 kicked off the first ready-to-wear collection (Fall-Winter 2015), with a Spring-Summer and a Fall-Winter collection subsequently released every year.

In February 2025, Francesco Ragazzi left Palm Angels following the brand's acquisition by Bluestar Alliance.

== Collaborations ==
In 2017, Palm Angels created a series of collaborations with brands such as Suicoke and Sundek.

In 2018, Palm Angels later teamed up with American brand, Vlone to design a small capsule of hoodies and also with Playboi Carti for a limited-edition capsule collection composed of tracksuits, t-shirts, a hoodie, and a denim jacket each emblazoned with a logo that reads “Palm Angels Die Punk”.

Soon after, Palm Angels launched its collaboration with BBC Ice Cream at The Webster NY and its first collaboration in the world of hotellerie with Setai Miami during Art Basel 2019. More recently, Palm Angels presented its Fall Winter 2020 collection in New York, unveiling the Palm Angles x C. & Clarks collaboration.

Palm Angels partnered with Haas F1 Team for the 2023 season, contributing to the design of the team's garages and race suits, as well as featuring their branding on the sides of their car's liveries.
