= Patrick Belaga =

American cellist and composer (born 1991)

- Born: 1991 (age 34–35); McLean, Virginia, U.S.
- Genres: Contemporary classical; ambient
- Occupations: Cellist; composer
- Instruments: Cello; synthesizer
- Label: PAN
- Website: patrickbelaga.org

Patrick Belaga (born 1991 in McLean, Virginia) is a cellist and composer. His work is considered contemporary classical music. His work includes a range of influences from Western classical, Middle Eastern classical, pop, new-age, Jazz and Folk and he has performed internationally. Belaga is a frequent collaborator with performance artists Wu Tsang and Boychild, having performed "Moved by the Motion", a vocal and dance performance with a live soundtrack shown at the Museum of Contemporary Art Los Angeles. He also scored Lady Gaga's 2017 Netflix documentary, Gaga: Five Foot Two.

== Early life and education ==
Belaga's mother found the Suzuki method classical music community in northern Virginia and Washington, D.C. His mother enrolled his older brother in violin training, and subsequently Belaga was enrolled in cello training. He later went on to attend University of North Carolina. After graduation, he briefly lived in New York before moving to Los Angeles in 2014.

== Work ==
Belaga often uses improvisation as the foundation of his compositions. His frequent collaborators include Kandis Williams, Wu Tsang, Boychild, Jacolby Satterwhite, Moses Sumney, Kelsey Lu, Puppets and Puppets, Eckhaus Latta, amongst others.

In 2019, Belaga released his first album, Groundswell. The album was influenced by figures ranging from the Greek composer Iannis Xenakis to the 20th-century classical musician Benjamin Britten, and by geological vocabulary ranging from rocks to mountains. The artist wrote, mixed, and produced all the tracks.

Later that year, Belaga along with pop artist Lafawndah, producer Nick Weiss, and Jacolby Satterwhite, released Love Will Find a Way Home. The work is a remixed recording of Satterwhite's mother, Patricia, who sang haunting, soulful pop songs on cassette tapes from the 1990s. The 14-track is 1 hour and 14 minutes and was released on vinyl as well as on iTunes and Spotify.

Belaga scored the Netflix documentary Lady Gaga, Gaga: Five Foot Two. The film premiered at the Toronto International Film Festival in September 2017.

In 2021, Belaga released his second studio album Blutt. The cover art was painted by visual artist Giovanni Forlino. The album is influenced by Hutsul music, a traditional form of Carpathian folk music that originates from what is now Western Ukraine and Romania.

== Discography ==
- Groundswell (self-released, 2019)
- Blutt (PAN, 2021)
