= Shayne Oliver =

American fashion designer and musician

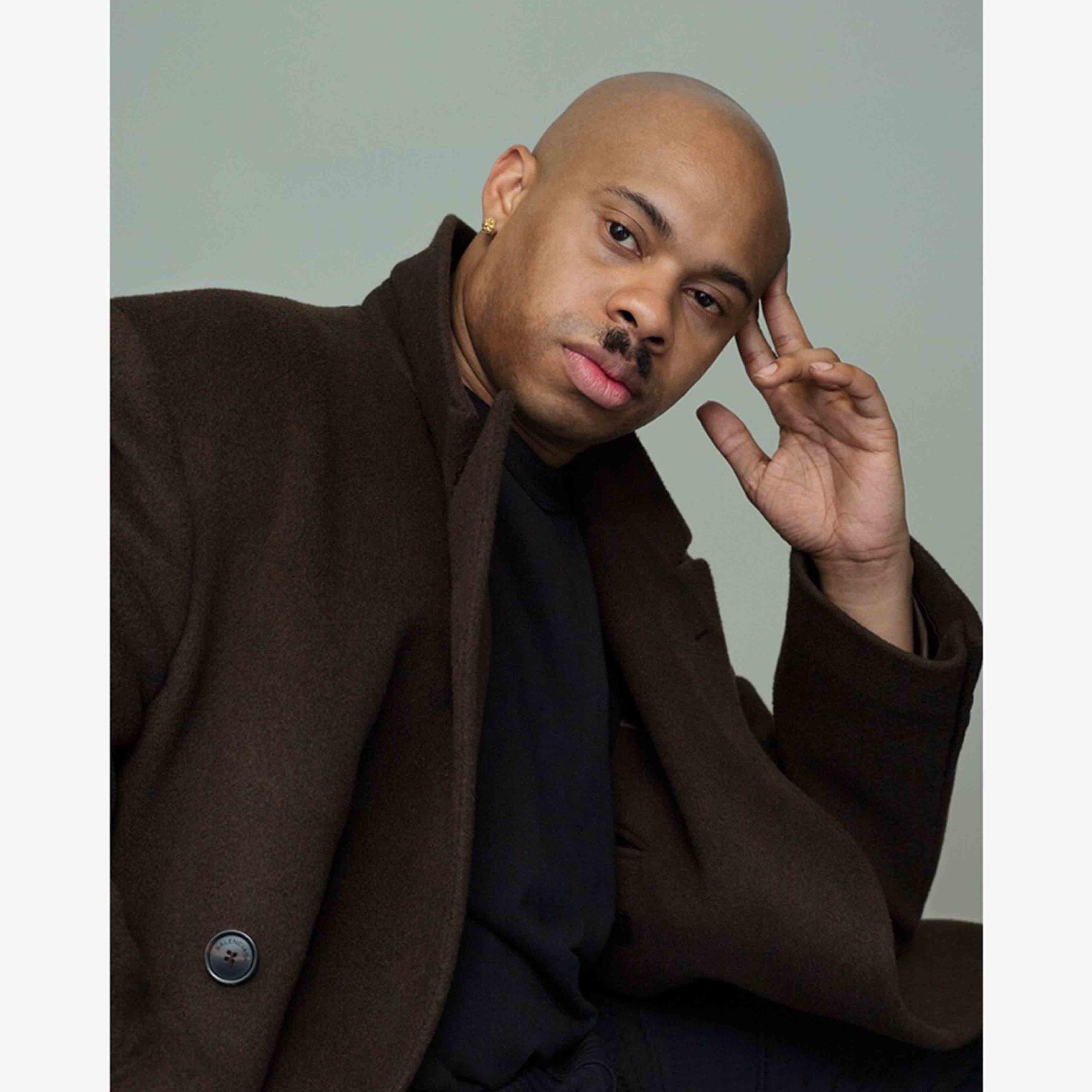
- Oliver in 2025
- Born: 1988 (age 37–38); Minnesota, U.S.
- Education: New York University; Fashion Institute of Technology
- Known for: Hood By Air co-founder

Shayne Oliver is a fashion designer, musician, and creative director based in New York City. He is the co-founder and design director of Hood By Air, a fashion brand he established together with designer Raul Lopez in 2006. In 2013, Oliver was named as one of the 25 Greatest Black Fashion Designers by Complex.

== Early years and education ==
Oliver was born in Minnesota in 1988. After living for several years in Trinidad as a child, he moved to Brooklyn in 2000. At the age of thirteen, Oliver began going to clubs and attending DJ nights. During that time, he met many people with whom he would later collaborate, including many of the queer artists who later would influence his work.

As a teenager, Oliver attended the Harvey Milk High School, an East Village public school designed for (but not limited to) gay, lesbian, bisexual, and transgender youth who may be at risk where they live. Through his experiences at the school, he became involved in the Ballroom scene, where he was taken under the wing of prominent dancer, Willi Ninja. Oliver began voguing and joined the House of Ninja, before moving to the House of Kahn and the House of Mizrahi. Eventually, he departed from the scene but remained inspired by the culture and music at its core.

In 2005 Oliver made the acquaintance of artist Dash Snow, fostering a relationship leading to Oliver showing some of his early Hood By Air designs at Snow's gallery in 2006. At the same time, Oliver attended New York University in Manhattan where he pursued an interest in performance art. At the time he began collaborating with artist Rashaad Newsome. Combining his interests in fashion and performance, Oliver started making his own looks for performances at Newsome's shows, with the artist viewing Oliver as a muse. At this stage, Oliver primarily was making clothes in which to perform. Over time however, his designs began to form as part of ready-to-wear collections which eventually were to be released with the Hood By Air brand.

After being at New York University, Oliver attended the Fashion Institute of Technology (FIT) in Manhattan and left after one semester. From 2009, while working on HBA, he was involved with GHE20G0TH1K, a club night launched by Jazmin Soto, aka Venus X, in New York City. On those nights Oliver popularized his style of DJing. He is self taught and used a CDJ as an instrument by playing with tempos and cues, influencing how audiences perceived the GHE20G0TH1K sound. He also met several future collaborators at GHE20G0TH1K parties including Arca [link], who later was a frequent collaborator on Hood By Air soundtracks. At the time, Oliver took inspiration from the way that French fashion designer Hedi Slimane incorporated music and bands into the lifestyle which accompanied his clothing. Oliver and Arca worked to create a parallel lifestyle via music and fashion crossovers.

== Hood By Air ==
Oliver co-founded Hood By Air in 2006 with fellow designer, Raul Lopez. Initially designing graphic t-shirts and sweatshirts which sold at boutiques including OAK NYC, Seven New York, and Opening Ceremony, the brand quickly amassed a cult following. Under Oliver's direction, Hood By Air (also known by the acronym, HBA), soon began expanding into ready-to-wear collections, displaying Oliver's technical design ability and becoming synonymous with diverse cultural reference points including queer culture and the ballroom scene, New York nightlife, high art, in addition to elements of skate and street culture.

Oliver, through Hood By Air, was credited by fashion magazine Dazed with "changing the face of fashion" in 2020. Interview magazine wrote that by "[perfecting] the union of streetwear and high fashion" Shayne "helped create the global merchandising blueprint for menswear today". Hood By Air is notable for its merging of art, music, and fashion through its design references as well as through performance art elements at its shows. Models at Hood By Air shows have included rapper A$AP Rocky, designer Telfar Clemens, artist Wolfgang Tilmans, and performance artist Boychild. Show soundtracks have been composed and performed by Arca, Total Freedom, Venus X, and Oliver himself.

From 2012 to 2017 the brand showed regularly at both New York Fashion Week and Paris Fashion Week, as well as presenting at the Italian menswear trade show, Pitti Uomo, in 2017. In mid-2017, he announced a hiatus period for Hood By Air, a decision that was informed by structural challenges within the business, and a desire to temporarily create outside of a singular brand structure. In 2020, Oliver announced the relaunch of Hood By Air under a new business structure. In 2021, Hood By Air released its first campaign imagery following its return from hiatus, featuring supermodel Naomi Campbell.

== Design roles ==
During a three-year hiatus from Hood By Air, Oliver worked with several international fashion houses in design and creative direction roles.

=== Helmut Lang ===
In 2017, Oliver was approached by Isabella Burley, editor-in-residence at Helmut Lang. Burley offered Oliver a design residency at the company, which Oliver accepted. In September 2017, Oliver unveiled the brand's Spring 2018 ready-to-wear collection at New York Fashion Week, reworking pieces known as Helmut Lang standards in Oliver's own design language. In addition to the ready-to-wear collection, Oliver created a capsule inspired by band tour merch, billed as Helmut Lang Seen by Shayne Oliver Autumn Tour Merch.

=== Diesel ===
After being at Helmut Lang, Oliver briefly worked with the Italian fashion brand, Diesel. In March 2018 Oliver and Diesel released a collaborative capsule collection as part of the Diesel Red Tag Project. Here, Oliver subverted Americana staples with his intricate reworking of denim apparel.

=== Longchamp ===
In a collaboration with Longchamp, released in May 2018, Oliver put his spin on the French luxury leather goods brand. In a collection which encompassed clothes, shoes, and bags, He played with the brand's luxury design vocabulary, placing recognizable tenets of the brand such as leather luggage handles onto the sleeves of jackets.

=== Colmar ===
Oliver also collaborated with heritage activewear label, Colmar, in 2018. Working on the Colmar A.G.E. (Advanced Garment Exploration) line, he reached into the label's extensive archive and reinterpreted a series of unisex styles, inspired by ‘alpine nostalgia’, for FW18. Oliver said that the collaboration is "juggling the iconic products of Colmar with my sense of performance and a unisex approach to wearing fashion".

=== Anonymous Club ===
Shayne Oliver is the creative director of Anonymous Club, a creative studio established in 2020 and formalized as part of the Hood By Air relaunch. Led by Oliver, the studio operates with a collective structure, providing residencies to creative talent in order to execute artistic projects together. Anonymous Club plays a role in shaping Hood By Air's wider brand through creative collaborations between the brand and others. In 2022, they launched their first presentation as Anonymous Club at The Shed in New York City called Headless: The Demonstration.

== Creative projects and aliases ==
- Shayne Oliver performs as Leech inhabiting a musical avatar which has also been embodied by Anonymous Club residents Boychild and Josh Johnson. In September 2020 Oliver, as Leech, released the single ‘In The Mood’.
- Between 2008 and 2009, he formed the band CHLDRN (also known as Children) with New York City-based artist, musician and composer Fatima Al Qadiri.
- Oliver has worked on various musical projects with Arca. In addition to working on Hood By Air soundtracks, the duo has released music under the project names 88 and Wench. Oliver and Arca worked on music for the 2020 documentary film, Shakedown, directed by Leilah Weinraub.

== Awards ==
● 2014 LVMH Special Jury Prize

● 2015 CFDA Swarovski Award for Menswear

● 2021 Nominated as a candidate for Cooper Hewitt, Smithsonian Design Museum
