= Hood By Air =

New York City-based fashion label

Hood By Air (often stylized as HBA) was a fashion and streetwear brand based in New York City co-founded by designers Shayne Oliver and Raul Lopez. Launched in 2006, Lopez left the brand three years later. The label took a hiatus from 2017 to 2019. Oliver left the brand in 2023 but remains a partner.

== Brand ==
The designer was Shayne Oliver, a former student at the Fashion Institute of Technology and New York University who described his design aesthetic as "ghetto gothic" and banjee. Oliver was named among The 25 Greatest Black Fashion Designers by Complex. Oliver brought in the conceptual artist and filmmaker Leilah Weinraub as CEO and cofounder in 2012. Weinraub was openly skeptical of the brand's celebrity endorsements. The company was notable for refusing outside investment. In the past, Hood By Air, also known by the acronym HBA, has identified as a "luxury streetwear brand," a term coined by Oliver and now "synonymous with HBA's subversive use of logos, high-end production values and an ingenious online presence".

Hood By Air is notable for its collectively-driven creative output, collaborating with a large network of artists, performers, and other figures from the New York creative industries, as well as global brands. The brand has been the recipient of several fashion accolades and awards, including the LVMH Special Prize (2014) and CFDA Swarovski Award for Menswear (2015).

== History ==
=== Founding and early years (2006–2009) ===
Founded in 2006 by town designers Shayne Oliver and Raul Lopez, Hood By Air went from a t-shirt oriented streetwear project to a cult brand at the forefront of New York's fashion new guard. In 2006, Oliver was running a brand and blog under the name Elite Urban Brigade. Editorial collaborators on the blog included Akeem Smith and Mykki Blanco. Under Elite Urban Brigade, Oliver began printing one-off t-shirt designs, which he would sell at the New York streetwear store, aNYthing. During this period, Oliver met fellow designer Raul Lopez at an after-school programme run by the Hetrick-Martin Institute in partnership with the Harvey Milk High School, which Oliver was attending. Oliver introduced Lopez to his early blueprint for a brand which could expand on his Elite Urban Brigade ideas. After developing the concept further, the two began printing t-shirts, eventually releasing the designs under the name Hood By Air.

Whilst attending Harvey Milk High School, Oliver was accepted onto an art programme at New York University (NYU). During this time he developed a strong link between his fashion concepts and music, which would underpin the Hood By Air brand and his creative career to date. During this time Oliver was a dancer and choreographer for the band Hercules and Love Affair and would create costumes that he would wear as a dancer. Subsequently, Oliver designed merchandise for the band. After leaving NYU, Oliver attended the Fashion Institute of Technology (FIT), but left after one semester.

In 2006 Oliver showed an early Hood By Air look at artist Dash Snow's gallery in Chelsea, New York. Soon after, with an expanding fan base and an enthusiastic reception from fashion buyers, Hood By Air found its first stockists in OAK NYC and Seven New York. Opening Ceremony was also an early stockist of the brand.

In 2008, Hood By Air held its first presentation at artist Terence Koh's A.S.S. gallery in Chinatown, New York. Designer Telfar Clemens, who attended the show recalls, "it was kind of a peep show, and sort of like a block-party-slash-art-opening type of thing". The presentation was an early example of what was to become a hallmark for the brand; a spectacle-driven approach that merges conventional runway shows with personality-driven performances and presentations.

In 2009 Hood By Air held its first official fashion presentation at OAK NYC, launching the Hood By Air Classics line. This subcategory of the brand encompassed Hood By Air's graphic-based designs on t-shirts and basics, complimenting the brand's now increasing focus on ready-to-wear. The presentation featured a performance by Kid Cudi. Soon after this presentation, Lopez left the brand.

=== Growth and recognition (2009–2014) ===
Oliver continued to build Hood By Air together with a core group of creative collaborators in New York. From 2009, whilst working on Hood By Air Oliver was involved with GHE20G0TH1K, a club night launched by Jazmin Soto, aka Venus X, in New York City. The party, which moved around venues in Williamsburg and the Lower East Side, brought together NYC's diverse creative communities and is widely celebrated as an influential party in the nightlife of the city. "We created a glamorous, fashion-friendly, art-friendly, freak fest," said Soto. "Everyone was welcome and everyone felt cool there. Everyone liked it." The culture and community around GHE20G0TH1K has been a paramount influence on Oliver's designs and the Hood By Air brand. Venus X is credited by Oliver as a major contributor to the growth of culture around the brand. Oliver also met Venezuelan musician Alejandra Ghersi, aka Arca at GHE20G0TH1K, forming a relationship that led to the pair working together on a continued basis.

After a short hiatus, Oliver launched what he describes as the second iteration of the brand. Bringing filmmaker, Leilah Weinraub, on board as CEO the pair formulated business plans that led to a revised focus on fashion presentations. HBA's global brand ambassador, Ian Isiah, and Kevin Amato, the brand's casting director, remained collaborators. New additions to the team included Paul Cupo signing on as design director, and Akeem Smith join as head stylist. Zachary Ching, at the time creative director at New York fashion retailer VFILES, would also join the brand as its commercial director. Oliver credits each of these figures as co-founders of the Hood By Air brand.

In May 2012, Hood By Air was included in Norwegian artist Bjarne Melgaard's group show 'Ideal Pole' at Ramiken Crucible gallery, New York. Hood By Air created a 'pop-up shop' as part of the exhibition, printing t-shirts with graphics that read 'Bareback By Air / Classics'. The t-shirts appeared in an installation titled Deferred Action, by the artists Jo Barage and Clinton Ellies.

A second season of HBA Classics followed, supported by launch events at the VFILES. In June 2012, VFILES held an opening party for its shop at Mercer Street in New York City's SoHo. The event doubled as a relaunch event for Hood By Air, with Oliver and Venus X DJ'ing, and A$AP Rocky performing. The moment has been referenced by Complex as solidifying both HBA and VFILES as "relevant movements in fashion". VFILES would become known for stocking an assortment of emerging brands at the crest of a creative new wave in streetwear, including Virgil Abloh's Pyrex, Been Trill, and Fear of God, alongside Hood By Air.

In the months following the relaunch moment, Hood By Air and Been Trill released a collaborative t-shirt that would be popularised through extensive exposure by A$AP Rocky, leading to a new frenzy around the brand. At the time, the hype around the product meant that Hood By Air was perceived as aligned with a streetwear fraternity, a notion which Oliver was dismissive of. According to the designer, the t-shirt was initially designed simply to be given to friends at a casual brunch, but became a "fucking phenomenon" according to Oliver.

Shortly afterwards, in September 2013, Hood By Air presented its first runway show, held at New York's Milk Studios. Presenting the brand's FW13 collection, Oliver cemented HBA's reputation for genre-blending and cross-cultural reference with a collection that paired bold graphics with progressive cut-and-sew pieces, and runway appearances from A$AP Rocky and performance artist, boychild [link], amongst the models cast for the show.

As Hood By Air continued to show its collections in a runway setting, the brand signed with fashion publicists, PR Consulting. Soon after, Hood By Air presented its first collection in Paris. The RTW Spring 2015 collection presented was billed as part two of what HBA had already unveiled at New York Fashion Week, with an emphasis on womenswear. The show invite – a lace-trimmed thong – signalled as much. "This is a 'femme' take on the energy we produced in New York," Oliver said of the show. "It's flashier, with details that are louder, to show off a little bit."

In October 2014 MoMA PopRally presented Id, a party performance and multimedia installation by Hood By Air, held at the Museum of Modern Art. The event was billed as "a performance masquerading as a party... Id is an interactive, semi-virtual experience that includes a theatre, a live stream, and a "humannequin" installation" and featured performances by boychild and Mykki Blanco.

Hood By Air was awarded the inaugural LVMH Special Jury Prize in 2014. In 2014, Hood By Air joined the New Guards Group.

=== New Guards Group era (2014–2016) ===
Under a new business structure led by the conglomerate, which handled HBA's production, distribution, and sales, the brand focused on expansion, shifting its production emphasis to product rather than cultural spectacle. By this stage Oliver had moved the brand's headquarters to Italy and Hood By Air began to work to a more intense fashion schedule, including pre-collections in Paris and expanding designs to include leathers, furs and tailoring.

In 2015 Hood By Air was selected for inclusion at the prestigious bi-annual menswear trade show, Pitti Uomo 87. Against expectations that the brand would simply transplant New York culture to a Florentine setting, the brand chose to overtake a Tuscan villa, with tailoring a key emphasis of the collection. Speaking with Vogue during a backstage interview, Oliver explained the show was "our first attempt to really push luxury in a full collection". This would be a benchmark moment for this era of Hood By Air, and signified the arrival of a new period of growth for the brand. The same year, Shayne Oliver received the 2015 Council of Fashion Designers of America (CFDA) Swarovski Award for Menswear.

Amidst the business growth under New Guards Group, however, Oliver felt a sense of creative regression as a consequence of focusing heavily on product, taking away from investing his energy into the cultural landscape that had always defined Hood By Air. After three seasons with New Guards Group, showing two to three collections per season, Hood By Air left the group and returned to New York in 2016.

=== Return to New York and hiatus (2016–2017) ===
Back on home ground, Oliver set about recapturing the energy of the brand before its move to Italy. Re-orienting towards conceptual presentations meant he had the freedom once again to design clothes and accessories specifically for runway moments, without such commercial pressure to sell through as the brand experienced during the New Guards Group era. Hood By Air's Fall 2016 Ready-To-Wear collection, titled 'Pilgrimage', was completed and shown in New York during NYFW. Reflecting on the collection, Vogue suggested that Oliver's time in Italy had added to the brand's technical expertise: "the new clothes reflect the strides he's made: There's a confidence that runs through, from the mind-boggling technical complexities of the outwear to the cheeky slogan bodysuits to the streetwise buckets hats", adding that Oliver has an "instinct for what's next"

In May 2016, Hood By Air held a brand presentation at the Delano Hotel during Art Basel Miami Beach. During the show, which was presented in partnership with MoMA PS1, Instagram-cast models wore clothing from the designer's collaboration with photographer Pieter Hugo, featuring Hugo's portraits of LGBT Jamaicans. W Magazine labelled the presentation "Art Basel 2016's most transgressive show".

Having re-engaged the spirit of the brand upon returning to New York City, Oliver and his team began to experience a new challenge; continuing the scale of the post-New Guards Group operation as a small, core team — most of whom were not fashion insiders or business people but artists, musicians, image-makers, and other figures from the New York creative industries with close ties to the brand and its cultural workings. While e-commerce continued to run efficiently during this period, the retail business had outsized its operators. The brand had reached new heights of popularity, spurred on by support from celebrities such as Rihanna who wore Hood By Air during a televised performance at the 2016 MTV Video Music Awards

In 2016, the brand released a capsule collection in collaboration with the pornographic video platform, Pornhub the SS17 'Wench' collection.

However, with external company interests calling for Oliver's design expertise, on April 6, 2017, Hood By Air announced that Oliver would be putting the brand on hold to take a new role at Helmut Lang. Hood By Air entered a three-year period of hiatus.

=== Hiatus (2017–2020) ===
The company remained on official hiatus between 2017 and 2020. During this time Shayne Oliver worked with several established fashion houses, as well as on personal creative projects.

==== Helmut Lang ====
Prior to Hood By Air's final pre-hiatus show, Shayne Oliver was approached by Helmut Lang's editor-in-residence, Isabella Burley, to take up a position at that brand as designer-in-residence. One month after Oliver had nullified his design responsibilities at Hood By Air he introduced his first offering under Helmut Lang, presenting the brand's Spring 2018 Ready-To-Wear collection in September 2017 at New York Fashion Week. That same month, Helmut Lang also released the Helmut Lang Seen by Shayne Oliver Autumn Tour Merch collection, inspired by band tour merchandise.

==== Diesel ====
Having completed his residency at Helmut Lang, Oliver worked with Italian denim giant, Diesel, unveiling a capsule collection as part of the Diesel Red Tag Project in March 2018. The capsule, which saw Oliver subvert Americana staples with his intricate reworking of denim apparel, provided the designer with an opportunity to become familiar with new design processes, whilst further establishing his appeal as a solo designer.

==== Colmar ====
In 2018 Oliver began to collaborate with heritage activewear label, Colmar. Applying his vision to the Colmar A.G.E (Advanced Garment Exploration) FW18 line, Oliver progressively reworked the brand's mountain attire, adding a sense of outsized surreality to conventional outdoors wear. He described the collaboration as "juggling the iconic products of Colmar with my sense of performance and a unisex approach to wearing fashion".

=== Second return (2020–2023) ===
In July 2020, Oliver announced the official return of Hood By Air. In an accompanying statement, the designer stated, "gentrification leaves no physical spaces for new, influential ideas to exist or reside. So Hood By Air will be a place for these ideas to have a home."

In March 2021, the brand fully relaunched with an advertising campaign helmed by supermodel Naomi Campbell.

The brand relaunched with a new structure consisting of four distinct components: 'Hood By Air' maintains its position as the brand's elevated fashion offering; 'HBA' exists as direct-to-consumer product released under a streetwear-aligned 'drop' schedule; 'Museum' refers to archival pieces from the original Hood By Air brand, reinterpreted by guest designers-in-residence; and Anonymous Club is a creative studio driven by a collective of talent, with the purpose of engineering Hood By Air's wider brand narrative through ongoing collaborations and activations. The brand's 2020 relaunch announcement was accompanied by the release of a limited edition t-shirt and cash card designed in collaboration with person-to-person mobile payment company Cash App. Proceeds from the t-shirt sales were donated to several charities, including Black Trans Femmes in the Arts, Emergency Release Fund, and Gays & Lesbians Living In A Transgender Society.

In March 2021, the brand further signalled its new visual era with an advertising campaign helmed by Naomi Campbell. The campaign announced a new 'Prologue' phase for the brand. In April 2021, as part of the phase, Hood By Air released a new series of products under the capsule title 'Veteran'. The product was released in five 'drops' emulating the streetwear spirit that Hood By Air has been connected with in the past. Intended as a segue between the brand's past and future, the 'Prologue' phase retrospectively pays tribute to a list of 'characters', each of which represents a different era of the Hood by Air brand.

As of 2021, Hood By Air is run by a board of directors including Oliver and Edison Chen, who has taken over the role of CEO. The brand remains an independent entity.

On December 19, 2023, Playboi Carti released the song H00DBYAIR which is named after the brand. Oliver quietly left the brand in 2023 as a designer while remaining a partner in favor of starting his own corporation based in Berlin. On January 15, 2024, Playboi Carti released the song EVILJ0RDAN which he can be seen wearing Hood By Air in the music video.

== Designs and shows ==
Hood By Air has received widespread praise and positive reception for its progressive design values and uncompromising aesthetics. The brand has been noted for its diverse subcultural touch points, taking influence and inspiration from the art world, queer culture, hip hop, club culture, and subversion of corporate branding through design.

In a 2015 article, Oliver's designs were described by i-D Magazine as "[questioning] gender, race and power, cutting through the noise of the fashion world with razor sharp precision". In a short biographical entry on the brand, the LVMH Prize describes Hood By Air as "re-imagining Americana uniforms" by "combining the fluidity of youth culture with the refinement of luxury fashion". Referencing Hood By Air's logo-heavy aesthetic, The Cut explains "they were more about signifying membership in a tribe than they were about advancing any design agenda." The article continues: "aggressively inclusive, HBA wasn't gay or straight. It wasn't skate or hip-hop or art or fashion—it was, rather, all these things at once." Designer and Creative Director, Matthew Williams, has described Hood By Air's relevance across cultural touch points: "Shayne's brand really is a bridge between fashion and urban street culture and music". Oliver himself expanded on his multifaceted references during an interview with Vogue; "I started making clothes because I wanted stuff to wear that could move between these worlds... This art world of downtown, in Manhattan, and this other world that I went home to—there are things that connect them." In the same article, fashion journalist, Maya Singer, posits that in its early years Hood By Air communicated a sense of authority though "exaggerated sizing, big logos, and in-your-face graphics", making a connection between these qualities of HBA and the "quintessential attributes of urban streetwear". Hood By Air worked prominently with designers Michael Magnum, Oscar Sanchez, and Virgil Abloh on graphics, particularly during its early years. Many of Hood By Air's graphics are inspired by film, queer, and delinquent culture. Despite its early focus on logos and graphics, the brand has since become known for its progressive, technically complex and often androgynous ready-to-wear collections.

Hood By Air is known for the performative nature of its fashion presentations, using the runway as a multifaceted performance space that brings together diverse elements from the brand's cultural mood board. In the past, notable runway appearances have been made by rapper, A$AP Rocky, performance artist, boychild, and German artist, Wolfgang Tillmans, whilst the music for several Hood By Air shows has been composed by Venezuelan musician Arca, who has also DJ'd at the shows.

The brand focused on gender-neutral designs, a mode described by Oliver as "powerwear". Its influences include 1990s-era New York City culture as well as brands like; Diesel, Tommy Hilfiger, Polo Sport and DKNY.

Oliver's creative collaborations included an installation with artists Ava Nirui and Alex Lee. For this, Nirui and Lee commissioned outfits by Hood By Air and designer Eckhaus Latta to be worn by Barbie dolls with a variety of realistic body-types.

The brand also collaborated with musicians A$AP Rocky, Kanye West, and Rihanna, and won awards from LVMH and the Council of Fashion Designers of America. It was chosen for a guest spot at menswear trade show Pitti Uomo in 2015. Its runway pieces have been sold at high-end boutiques like Opening Ceremony, Colette in Paris and Harvey Nichols in London.

== Fashion shows and collections ==
- Spring 2014 Menswear (New York Fashion Week)
- Fall 2014 Menswear (New York Fashion Week)
- Fall 2014 Ready-to-Wear (New York Fashion Week)
- Spring 2015 Ready-to-Wear (Part 1: New York Fashion Week, Part 2: Paris Fashion Week, Part 3: MoMA, New York)
- Fall 2015 Ready-to-Wear (New York Fashion Week)
- Fall 2015 Menswear (New York Fashion Week)
- Pitti Uomo 87 Presentation (Florence, Italy)
- Spring 2016 Menswear (Paris Fashion Week)
- Spring 2016 Ready-to-Wear (New York Fashion Week)
- Fall 2016 Ready-to-Wear (New York Fashion Week)
- Spring 2017 Menswear (Paris Fashion Week)
- Spring 2017 Ready-to-Wear (New York Fashion Week)

== Brand collaborations ==
- Barneys
- Been Trill
- Bjarne Melgaard
- Cash App
- Colette
- Corgi
- Dolly Cohen
- Dover Street Market
- Fox (Empire)
- Frye Boots
- Gentle Monster
- Hustler
- Kangol
- LUMA Foundation
- Pieter Hugo
- Pornhub
- Selfridges
- Starter
- Swarovski
- Virgil Abloh
- Woolmark

== Awards ==
- 2014 LVMH Special Jury Prize
- 2015 CFDA Swarovski Award for Menswear

== See also ==
- Rick Owens
- Raf Simons
- Supreme
- Proenza Schouler
