= Wu Tsang =

American filmmaker (born 1982)

- Born: 28 January 1982 (age 44); Worcester, Massachusetts, US
- Education: School of the Art Institute of Chicago; University of California at Los Angeles
- Occupations: filmmaker; performer; artist

Wu Tsang (born 1982 in Worcester, Massachusetts) is a filmmaker, artist, and performer based in New York and Berlin whose work explores hidden histories, marginalized narratives, and the politics of visibility. Tsang’s practice spans film, performance, and installation, often centering queer and trans communities, immigrant experiences, and the social conditions that shape public and private space. Their work frequently engages with the body as a site of transformation, using performance theory and trans embodiment to question how identities are constructed, perceived, and regulated.

Tsang is known for blending documentary and fiction, creating hybrid forms that foreground collaboration and collective authorship. Their early involvement in Los Angeles queer nightlife and community organizing—particularly at the Silver Platter, a historic bar for Latinx LGBTQ+ communities, informs much of their artistic approach. This context shaped works such as Wildness (2012), a film that examines queer nightlife, immigrant community spaces, and the politics of belonging through experimental narrative strategies.

Collaboration is central to Tsang’s practice, especially their long‑standing partnership with the performer boychild. Together, they have produced performances and installations for major museums and biennials, using movement, sound, and light to explore themes of opacity, legibility, and queer‑of‑color critique. Their work often challenges institutional frameworks by foregrounding embodied knowledge, affective labor, and the politics of representation.

In 2018, Tsang received a MacArthur “genius” grant in recognition of their innovative contributions to contemporary art and performance. According to Tsang, her films, videos, and performances look to explore the "in-betweenness" in which people and ideas cannot be discussed in binary terms. Generally, her films form a hybrid of narrative and documentary; they do not conform fully to one form or the other.

Her projects have been presented at the Tate Modern (London), Stedelijk Museum (Amsterdam), Migros Museum (Zurich), the Whitney Museum and the New Museum (New York), the MCA Chicago, MoCA Los Angeles and SFMOMA (San Francisco). In 2012 she participated in the Whitney Biennial, Liverpool Biennial and Gwangju Biennial.

== Trans Embodiment and Performance Theory ==
Tsang’s work is frequently discussed within the fields of transgender studies and performance theory, where scholars highlight their engagement with embodiment, visibility, and the politics of representation. Drawing on traditions of queer and trans performance, Tsang’s films and installations explore how gender is lived, performed, and mediated through social, spatial, and institutional structures. Their practice often foregrounds the body as a site of negotiation between legibility and opacity, challenging normative expectations of visibility for trans and gender‑nonconforming subjects.

Performance theorists have noted that Tsang’s work resists the demand for transparency often placed on trans bodies in visual culture. Instead, Tsang employs strategies of partial visibility, abstraction, and collaborative authorship to emphasize the limits of representation. Susan Stryker’s foundational writing on trans embodiment provides a framework for understanding Tsang’s approach, particularly in relation to the ways trans artists navigate institutional and cultural pressures to “explain” or “prove” their identities.

Tavia Nyong’o has argued that Tsang’s work contributes to a broader queer‑of‑color critique by foregrounding the affective and relational dimensions of trans life, especially within immigrant and nightlife communities. Nyong’o describes Tsang’s aesthetic strategies as forms of “critical opacity,” in which the refusal to fully disclose or stabilize identity becomes a mode of resistance to surveillance and policing.

Across film, performance, and installation, Tsang’s practice engages with questions central to contemporary trans theory: how bodies are read, how visibility is negotiated, and how communities create alternative modes of belonging. Their work is frequently cited in scholarship on trans aesthetics, queer nightlife, and the politics of performance, positioning Tsang as a significant figure in the development of trans and queer visual culture.

== Education ==
Tsang received a B.F.A. (2004) from the School of the Art Institute of Chicago and an M.F.A. (2010) from the University of California at Los Angeles.

== Work ==
=== Film ===
Tsang's best-known documentary, Wildness, documents the Los Angeles trans bar "Silver Platter". Wu Tsang directed and produced the film. It was co-written with Roya Rastegar. The film premiered at the MoMA Documentary Fortnight in New York and has been screened at festivals in Canada, the US, and Chile. Since 1963, "Silver Platter" has been a historic bar that has been patronised by a predominantly Latin LGBT community. Wildness documents what happens when a group of young artists hosts a weekly performance night at the bar. Documenting the collision between the two LGBT communities, the film poses questions about community, space, and ownership. In an interview, Tsang describes how this film represents a number of people who are often stereotyped, such as trans people, people of color, and queer communities, and she experiments with how to be accountable to the communities that she documents. Her collaborators include poet and scholar Fred Moten as well as performance artist boychild.

==== Short films ====
Wu Tsang's short films include:

- Under Cinema (2017): This film follows R&B singer Kelela along for a deep dive into the life of a black artist. The film is intimately shot on a handheld camera which follows Kelela through events such as a festival, studio time, and emotional reflections. "The most memorable moment of Under Cinema is when Kelela speaks to camera and eloquently dismantles the music industry by pointing out how it is ‘interested in … the currency of culture you come with as a person of colour’ and that ‘pop music comes from R&B, it’s a painful music."
- Duilian (2015): The film explores the life and writings of Qiu Jin, a Chinese feminist revolutionary who was executed at the age of 31 for attempting to foment revolution against the Qing dynasty. Lesser known, and highlighted in the film, is her long-term queer relationship with calligrapher Wu Zhuying. Wu Tsang plays Wu Zhuying, and long-time Wu Tsang collaborator, Boychild, plays Qiu Jin. The film illuminates the use of Qui Jin's poems (translated in English for the first time) and Wushu Martial Arts to create "jarring yet beautiful scenes."
- You're Dead to Me (2013): In suburban California, a Chicana mother is mourning the death of her trans child two years earlier. On the eve of Dia de los Muertos, everything changes when Death offers her a choice she could not make in life. The cast includes Laura Patalano and Harmony Santana. The film was widely shown in LGBT and other film festivals, and won various awards, including best short and best actress.
- Tied and True (2012): Co-written with Nana Oforiatta-Ayim, the film takes place in a fictional post-colonial African city, inspired by Île Saint-Louis, Senegal. It tells the story of two star-crossed lovers while exploring the themes of assimilation, alterity and racism.
- Mishima in Mexico (2012): Starring Alex Segade and Wu Tsang, the film is inspired by the 1950 novel by Yukio Mishima, Thirst for Love. It takes place in Mexico City, where a writer and director check into a hotel together to work through their creative process, while integrating Mishima's work into their own, and into their lives.
- Wildness (2012): Is a hybrid documentary‑fiction film that chronicles the weekly party and community clinic Tsang co‑organized at the Silver Platter, a historic bar in the MacArthur Park neighborhood of Los Angeles. The bar has long served as a gathering place for Latinx LGBTQ+ communities, particularly trans women and undocumented immigrants. The film blends documentary footage with staged sequences and magical‑realist narration, presenting what Tsang has described as a “whimsically fictional account” of the events that unfolded at the Silver Platter. The narrative is delivered both by Tsang and, in Spanish, by the Silver Platter itself, personified as a speaking character.

In interviews, Tsang has emphasized that the film emerged from her involvement in the bar’s community and her desire to represent the lives of her friends ethically and collaboratively. She has stated that “the more subjective I could be in telling my own experience of the situation, the more ethical I could be to my subjects and collaborators.” In a 2020 interview with Art Basel Art Basel, Tsang described approaching the project “more as an activist than a filmmaker,” explaining that she “felt there was an important story to tell about the lives of [her] friends at the bar, many of whom were trans women and undocumented immigrants, often struggling with overlapping invisibilities, and thriving despite intense conditions of violence and policing.”

Scholars in performance studies have highlighted Wildness as a significant contribution to queer‑of‑color cinema for its exploration of nightlife as a site of refuge, cultural production, and contested belonging. Writing in TDR, Tavia Nyong’o argues that the film foregrounds the “scene of the unscene,” drawing attention to the forms of labor, kinship, and survival that sustain queer immigrant communities while resisting the pressures of hypervisibility. Scholars in GLQ and TSQ have similarly noted that the film complicates documentary ethics by acknowledging the power dynamics inherent in representing marginalized communities, particularly when the filmmaker is also a participant in the space.

The film also engages with questions of collective authorship. Many of the Silver Platter’s regulars, performers, and staff appear not merely as documentary subjects but as collaborators whose voices shape the narrative. This approach aligns with broader debates in queer‑of‑color performance studies about community accountability, affective labor, and the ethics of visibility. Art historian David Getsy has described Tsang’s method as a form of “queer formalism,” in which aesthetic experimentation is inseparable from the social and political contexts of queer life.

Tsang has described the making of Wildness as a formative learning process in which she taught herself to “write, direct, and edit.” The film premiered at The Museum of Modern Art’s Documentary Fortnight in 2012 and later screened at the Hot Docs Canadian International Documentary Festival in Toronto.

==== Feature films ====
- MOBY DICK; or, The Whale (2022): This is a 75-minute digital silent film accompanied by live orchestra. It is an adaptation of Herman Melville's 1851 classic Moby-Dick, with a post-colonial reading. It drew inspiration from C. L. R. James’s Mariners, Renegades, and Castaways: The Story of Herman Melville and the World We Live In, which studied the Melville work as related to colonialist greed and 1950s social hierarchy. Tsang's film depicts the ship's crew as having partially transcended gender and race, and features the main characters Ishmael and Queequeg as lovers. The film, supported by the Swiss theater Schauspielhaus Zürich, premiered in 2022, and was shown at the Thyssen-Bornemisza Museum in Madrid in 2023.

=== Art installations ===
- Moved by the Motion (2014– 2015) - is the first in a series of performances and works by Tsang that inhabits a space between fiction and documentary. This was presented over the course of 2014–2015 including a live performance at DiverseWorks as part of CounterCurrent in collaboration with the University of Houston Cynthia Woods Mitchell Center for the Arts (Saturday, April 12, 2014) and a video installation in the exhibition Double Life at the Contemporary Arts Museum Houston (December 19, 2014 – March 13, 2015).
- Anthem (2021). Anthem is a "film portrait" created in collaboration with singer, composer, and trans activist Beverly Glenn-Copeland. The installation includes a projection of Glenn-Copeland on an 84-foot curtain.

== Awards and honors ==
In 2012, Tsang was named one of Filmmaker Magazine's "25 New Faces of Independent Film". At Outfest 2012, Wildness won the Grand Jury Award for Outstanding Documentary. Also in 2012, her work was featured in the Whitney Biennial and the New Museum Triennial. She won the Foundation for Contemporary Arts Grants to Artists award (2013). In 2014, she was included in the Hammer Museum's 2014 "Made in L.A." biennial. In 2015 she received a Creative Capital Award for A Day in the Life of Bliss. Tsang received the MacArthur Genius Award in 2018. From the years of 2019-2024, Tsang acted as the director-in-residence at the Schauspielhaus (City Theatre) Zurich. Most recently, in 2025, Wu Tsang was selected as Harvard University's Department of Art, Film, and Visual Studies Soloman Fellow. This title will include Tsang sharing her insights with the student body at Harvard through public lecture.

== Filmography ==
- Wildness
- Mishima in Mexico
- Tied and True
- You're Dead to Me
- Duilian
- Under Cinema

== Institutional Critique and Collaboration ==
Collaboration plays a central role in Tsang’s artistic practice, particularly in their long‑standing partnership with the performer boychild. Together, Tsang and boychild have developed a body of work that combines movement, sound, and installation to explore themes of embodiment, legibility, and the politics of visibility. Their performances often employ strategies of abstraction, partial opacity, and improvisation, challenging normative expectations of how trans and queer bodies should appear within institutional spaces. Scholars have noted that these collaborations foreground the relational and affective dimensions of performance, emphasizing the body as a site of resistance to surveillance and categorization.

Tsang’s installations and performances have been presented in major museums and biennials, where they frequently engage in forms of institutional critique. Their work interrogates how cultural institutions shape the visibility of marginalized communities, particularly queer and trans people of color. Drawing on queer‑of‑color critique, Tsang’s projects highlight the tensions between representation and erasure, questioning how museums frame narratives of identity, community, and belonging. Performance theorists have argued that Tsang’s approach resists the demand for transparency often placed on trans artists, instead embracing opacity as a method for protecting and honoring the complexity of lived experience.

In collaborative works such as Moved by the Motion, Tsang and boychild create immersive environments that blur distinctions between performer and audience, fiction and documentation. These projects often incorporate live performance, video projection, and sculptural elements, producing what critics describe as “expanded performance” that challenges the spatial and temporal boundaries of the museum. Their methodology emphasizes collective authorship and shared agency, aligning with broader debates in performance studies about the ethics of collaboration and the politics of representation within institutional contexts.

Through these collaborations, Tsang has become a significant figure in contemporary institutional critique, using performance to examine how museums and cultural spaces mediate access, visibility, and power. Their work continues to influence discussions in queer and trans art history, performance theory, and the study of institutional politics.

== See also ==
- List of transgender film and television directors
