= Heron Preston =

American fashion designer (born 1983)

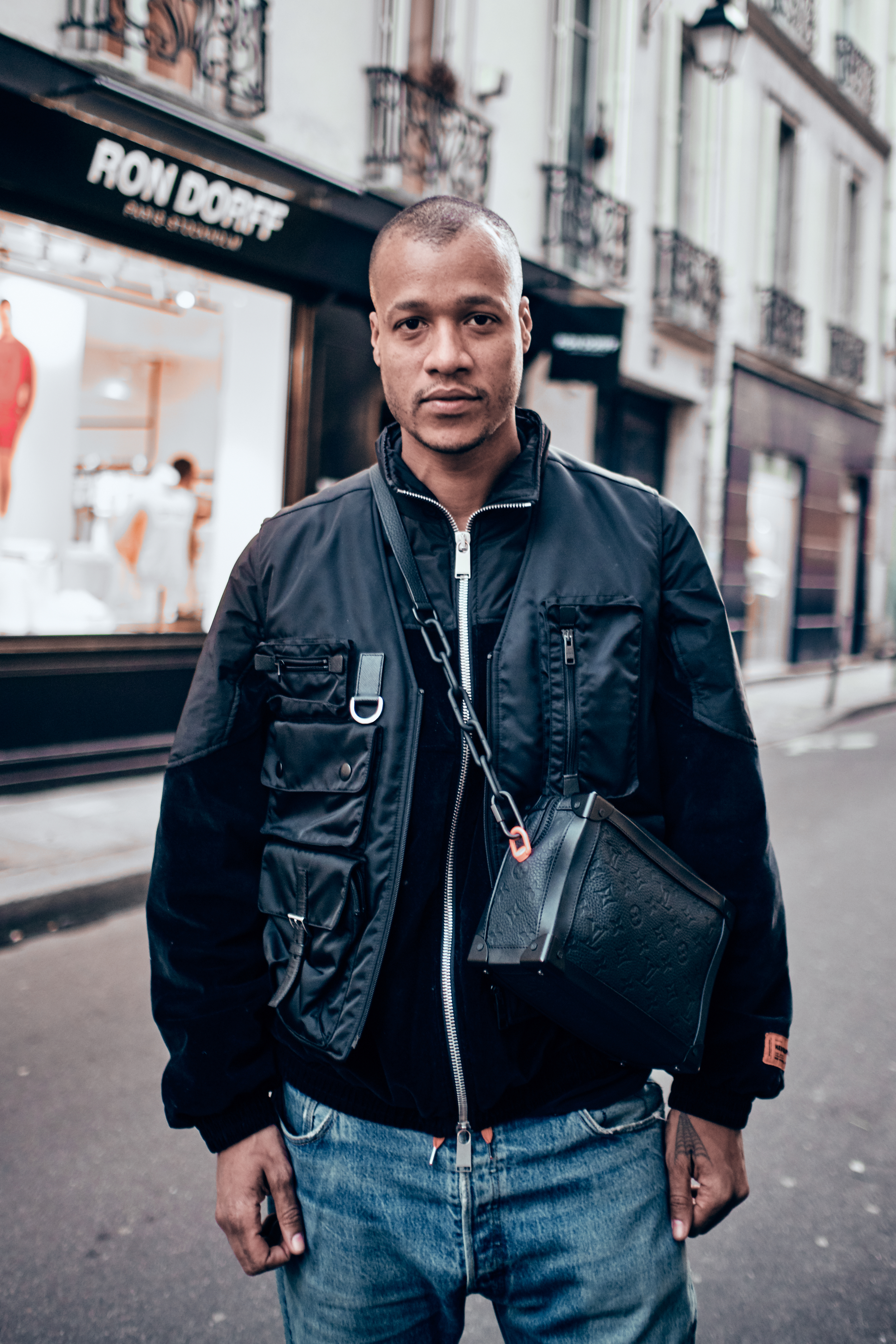
- Preston in 2019
- Born: Heron Preston Johnson; April 18, 1983 (age 43); San Francisco, CA
- Education: Parsons School of Design
- Occupations: Designer, artist, and DJ
- Label: Heron Preston

Heron Preston Johnson, known professionally as Heron Preston, is an American artist, fashion designer, and disc jockey. He is a co-founder of the men's streetwear brand Been Trill, alongside Virgil Abloh, Justin Saunders, and others; and founder of his eponymous brand, Heron Preston.

== Education ==
Born in San Francisco, CA, Preston moved to New York in 2004 to attend Parsons School of Design. He graduated in 2007, and stayed in New York to pursue a career in fashion.

== Career ==
Al Moran, one of the founders of the Morán Morán art gallery, discovered Preston's blog featuring street photography and offered him a publishing deal. Preston worked as a marketing specialist and social media director for Nike. He also worked as an art director for Kanye West, for whom he designed tour merchandise and acted as a consultant for West's album The Life of Pablo and his brand Yeezy.

On September 9, 2016, he launched UNIFORM, a catalog of zero waste themed clothes created in collaboration with the New York City Department of Sanitation. In 2017, he opened a pop up shop in Moscow, where he sold selected pieces from his collaboration with the DSNY. In 2017, he presented his 2017–2018 fall-winter collection For You, The World at Paris Fashion Week. In 2018, Preston launched a new collection in collaboration with NASA to celebrate its 60th anniversary. The pieces featured in the collection are inspired by the pressure suits worn by astronauts and feature the NASA "worm" logotype. Preston also runs the e-commerce platform HPC Trading Co, where he features his curated collections of art, music and fashion.

In addition to his career in fashion, Preston is a DJ and has worked for events organized by brands such as GQ, Ford, Sprite, and Supreme. He has also participated in large events and festivals, including Coachella, Ultra and Fool's Gold Day Off. In 2016, Preston released ONE HUNDO, a mixtape including music from Zomby, Kanye West, Beyoncé and Drake.

In 2017, Preston published Honorable Profession, a limited edition of a zine of convicts and crime scenes photos taken of his father while he was a police officer, which were taken in the 1980s and 1990s in Bayview-Hunters Point, San Francisco. These pictures were featured as a series of large print in the BORROWED TIME group art show in Los Angeles.

In 2018, Preston collaborated with Carhartt WIP on a capsule collection, which juxtaposes workwear and luxury.

Heron Preston designed merchandise associated with Justin Timberlake's Man of the Woods project in 2018.

In 2023 Preston joined H&M as Creative Menswear Advisor.

In 2025 Preston regained full control of his brand from New Guards Group.

== Russian cultural influence ==
Many items from the Heron Preston collections (with the exception of limited capsule collections) are decorated with a print or embroidery with the word "style" in the Cyrillic alphabet (CTИЛЬ). Heron noted that this idea came to him in 2014, when he helped a friend with an exhibition dedicated to the hip-hop culture of the 90s. He has stated that he chose to use Cyrillic because of his obsession with Russian culture and paraphernalia.

== See also ==
- New Guards Group
