= Virgil Abloh =

American fashion designer and entrepreneur (1980–2021)

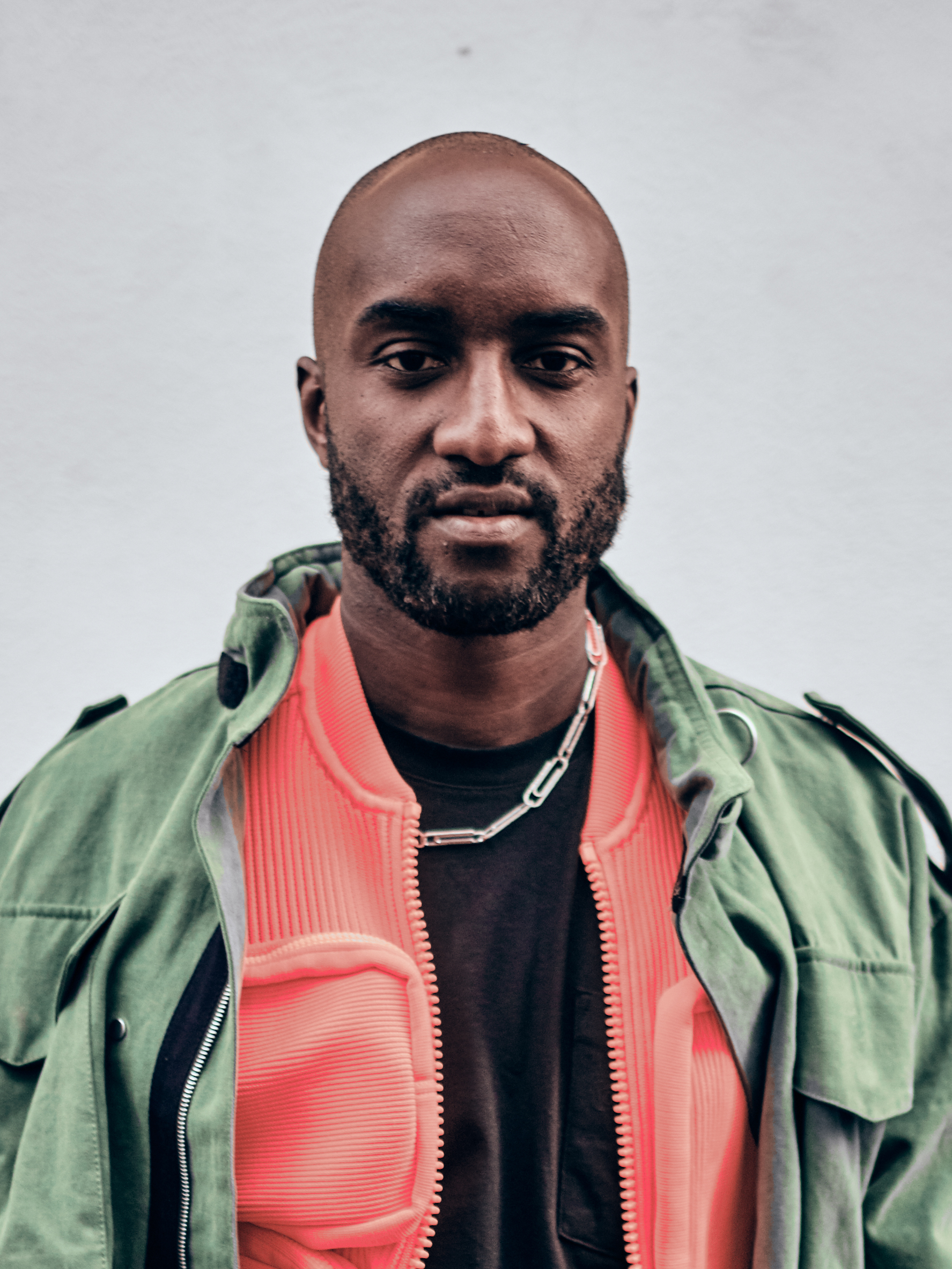
- Abloh in 2019
- Born: September 30, 1980; Rockford, Illinois, U.S.
- Died: November 28, 2021 (aged 41); Chicago, Illinois, U.S.
- Education: University of Wisconsin–Madison (BS); Illinois Institute of Technology (MArch)
- Occupations: Designer; entrepreneur; disc jockey
- Years active: 2009–2021
- Title: Founder and CEO of Off-White; Artistic Director of menswear at Louis Vuitton; Creative Director of Donda
- Spouse: Shannon Sundberg (m. 2009)
- Children: 2

Virgil Abloh (/ˈæbloʊ/; September 30, 1980 – November 28, 2021) was an American fashion designer and entrepreneur. A trained architect, Abloh founded his own line of luxury streetwear clothing under the moniker Pyrex Vision in 2012, which he transformed into the Milan based fashion label Off-White in 2013. Abloh was appointed artistic director of Louis Vuitton's menswear collection beginning in 2018 and was given increased creative responsibilities across the LVMH brand in early 2021. Abloh worked in Chicago street fashion before he entered the world of international fashion with an internship at Fendi in 2009, alongside American rapper Kanye West. Abloh assumed the role of creative director at Donda, West's creative agency in 2010.

When Abloh joined LVMH in 2018, he became the first Ghanaian-American artistic director of a French luxury fashion house. He was named by Time magazine as one of the 100 most influential people in the world that year. Abloh's design aesthetic, which bridged streetwear and luxury clothing, was described as transformative by The New York Times. According to The Wall Street Journal, he reached a level of global fame unusual for a designer, and as an influential figure, according to the BBC.

== Early life and education ==
Virgil Abloh was born on September 30, 1980, in Rockford, Illinois, to Ewe parents from Ghana. His mother was a seamstress and his father managed a paint company. From his mother, he learned how to sew. Abloh was raised in Rockford, where he attended Boylan Catholic High School, graduating in 1998. He graduated from the University of Wisconsin–Madison in 2002 with a Bachelor of Science degree in civil engineering. He received his Master of Architecture at the Illinois Institute of Technology (IIT) in 2006. When Abloh was attending IIT, there was a building on campus under construction designed by the architect Rem Koolhaas (who had also worked on runway collections for Prada). Koolhaas's building helped spark his interest in fashion. Abloh was further inspired by Crown Hall, designed by Ludwig Mies van der Rohe. Abloh's master's thesis project involved a design for a Chicago skyscraper, which curved in the direction of Lake Michigan. While studying architecture, he also designed T-shirts and wrote on fashion and design for a blog, The Brilliance. Abloh first met musician Kanye West while working on his designs at a Chicago print shop.

== Career ==
=== 2009–2013: Rise to prominence ===
After getting his architecture degree, Abloh interned at Fendi in the same class as rapper Kanye West in 2009. Placed in the company's Rome, Italy office, the two began a collaborative relationship. During his work with the rapper and designer, Abloh caught the eye of the Louis Vuitton CEO, Michael Burke. Later that year, Abloh and West's artistic partner, Don C, launched a retail store, called the RSVP Gallery, located in Chicago. The store became known for carrying a mixture of fashion apparel, and for its reflection of Abloh's style on his design for the store interior. A year later, West appointed Abloh the creative director of his creative agency, Donda.

In 2011 West asked him to serve as the artistic director for his 2011 collaborative album with Jay-Z Watch the Throne, earning the designer a Grammy nomination. In 2012, Abloh designed the cover art for WZRD's self-titled debut. In 2012, Abloh launched his first company, Pyrex Vision. He purchased deadstock clothing from Ralph Lauren for $40, screen-printed designs on them and sold them for prices upward of $550. He closed the company down a year later as he did not intend it to be a commercial enterprise, but an artistic experiment.

=== 2013–2017: Off-White and mainstream success ===
In a large part streetwear is seen as cheap. What my goal has been is to add an intellectual layer to it and make it credible.

— Abloh on the inspiration behind founding high-end streetwear label, Off-White.

Abloh founded his first fashion house and second business overall in 2013 with the high-end streetwear brand Off-White, designing a logo inspired by Ben Kelly. Based in Milan, Italy, the company was described by Abloh as "the gray area between black and white as the color off-white" to investors and fashion critics. During the launch of his brand, he received help from the New Guards Group, who also assisted many other designers and brands, such as Palm Angels, Heron Preston, and Marcelo Burlon. Abloh said his first Off-White collection was inspired by Ludwig Mies van der Rohe's floating glass home, Farnsworth House, and presented it with references to the Baroque artist Caravaggio and the early 20th century German design studio The Bauhaus. The brand lead generated widespread attention for his apparel beginning in Paris, then expanding to China, Japan, and the United States. The clothing line can be identified through its use of quotation marks, zip-ties, capital letters, and barricade tape. He launched the company's women's wear line in 2014 and showed the collections at Paris Fashion Week. His line was selected as a finalist for the LVMH Prize, an industry award, but lost to Marques'Almeida and Jacquemus. Abloh launched his first concept store for Off-White in Hong Kong in 2014. He opened his second store in Tokyo, Japan, where he started the company's furniture arm, Grey Area, followed by stores in Singapore and New York. Through Abloh's re-designing he exercised his self-made rule of only editing the shoes 3% of the way because he was intrigued by still maintaining the original design of the shoe.

=== 2013–2018: Off-White and collaborations ===
By the end of 2018, an index of sales and consumer sentiment ranked Off-White as the hottest label in the world, surpassing Gucci. Virgil also partnered up with the Swedish furniture company IKEA to design furniture for apartments and houses as well as easy to carry tote bags with the word sculpture imprinted in the middle. The collection was named Markerad, which is a Swedish word meaning "clear-cut; crisp; pronounced", and was released in 2019. Virgil envisioned that the collection would include practical furniture featuring contemporary designs. In 2017, he was asked to design a new collection in conjunction with Nike entitled "The Ten" and he re-designed a variety of the company's best-selling shoes. Abloh worked towards fulfilling his vision for the IKEA collection by sketching out drafts of generic pieces of furniture, while adding his own aesthetics to the designs by using a doorstop to level out furniture items. Abloh worked on designs for chairs, coffee tables, beds, storage cabinets, mirrors, and carpets as part of his collaboration with IKEA. Abloh used quotation marks to convey detachment from society and social norms. During the rise in neo-nationalism in 2017 Abloh worked with conceptual artist Jenny Holzer to create a line emphasizing the positive aspects of immigration, cultural integration, and globalization. In December 2017, he worked with Holzer again to design T-shirts for Planned Parenthood in response to the Women's March on Washington.

=== 2018–2021: Louis Vuitton ===
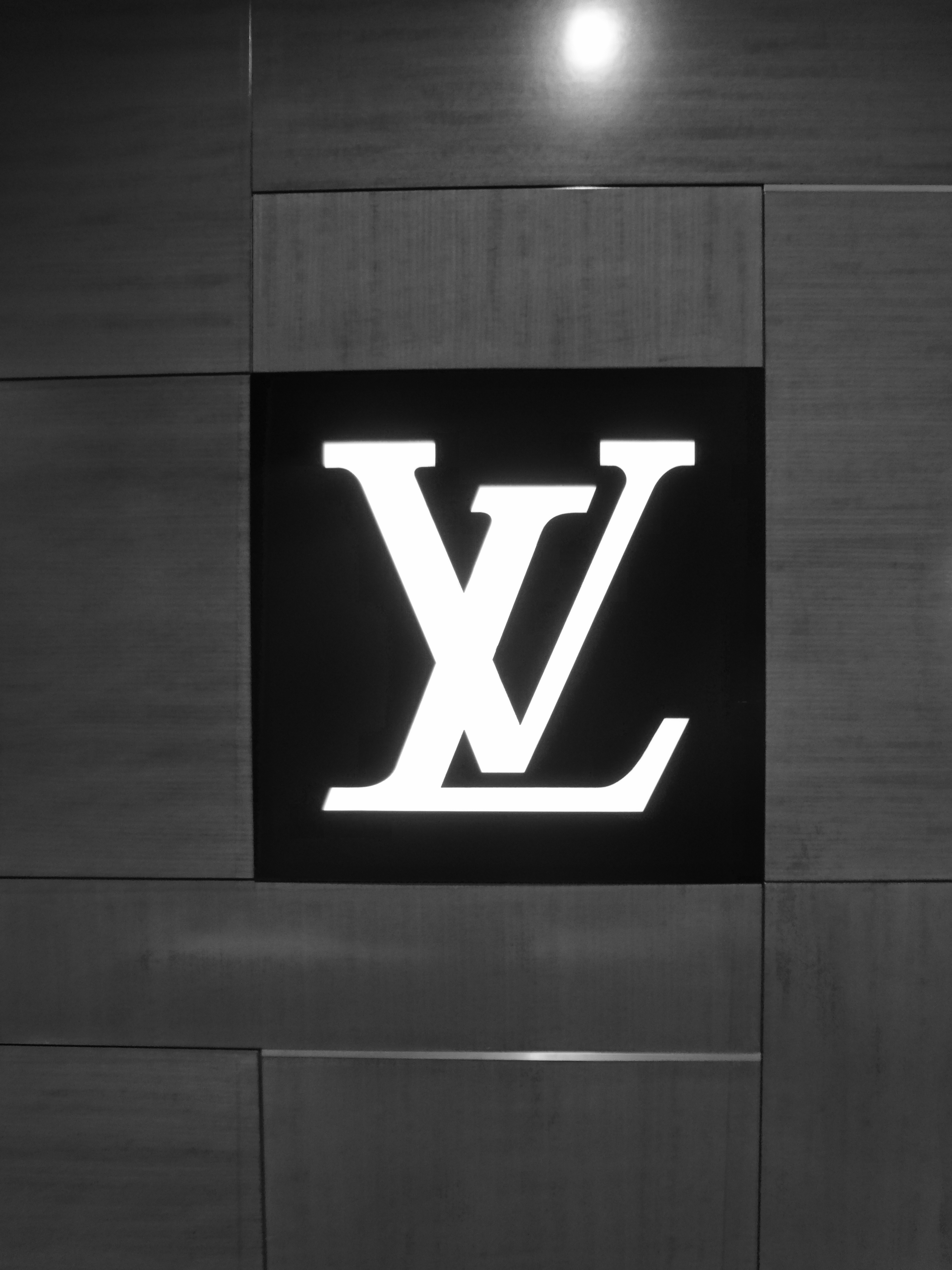
Abloh incorporated the LV logo in his debut menswear collection for the brand.

On March 25, 2018, Abloh was named artistic director of Louis Vuitton's menswear ready-to-wear line, making him the first person of African descent to lead the brand's menswear line, as well as one of the few black designers at the helm of a major French fashion house. Upon his acceptance of the position, he stated, "It is an honor for me to accept this position. I find the heritage and creative integrity of the house are key inspirations and will look to reference them both while drawing parallels to modern times". Abloh showed his first collection for Louis Vuitton at the 2018 Men's Fashion Week at the Palais-Royal gardens in Paris. Rihanna was the first well known person to wear Abloh prior to this watershed show. Playboi Carti, Steve Lacy, A$AP Nast, Dev Hynes, and Kid Cudi walked the runway for Abloh's debut Vuitton show. Abloh was in high demand thereafter for his designs, creating an original outfit designed for Serena Williams to wear throughout the 2018 US Open, a collaboration with Nike. On June 5, 2018, Abloh released a special collaboration with the luggage manufacturer Rimowa, a transparent suitcase in a limited edition. In March 2019, Abloh collaborated with IKEA to start making furniture for millennials, ranging from cabinets, rugs, coffee tables, and chairs. Abloh incorporated different elements of style, such as his quotation marks around certain words and putting it on different articles of clothing, and in this case different types of furniture. For example, Abloh created a "Door Stop Interruption" on a chair by adding a doorstop on one of the chair legs to make it elevated. One of Abloh's most popular items is the Frakta Bag. It is beige with the text "SCULPTURE" imprinted on the side. In March 2019 Abloh teamed up with SSENSE to release a workout collection. This collection contained a variety of workout clothes ranging from; matching leggings and sports bras, athletic sweaters, and crop tops. The collection incorporated some of Abloh's signature designs by including the Off-White yellow sign wrapping around the waist of the pants and bottom of the sports bras. Abloh also included a three-dimensional addition of his four-way arrows, creating a cross, on the front of the tops and pants.

"I now have a platform to change the industry ... We’re designers, so we can start a trend, we can highlight issues, we can make a lot of people focus on something or we can cause a lot of people to focus on ourselves... I’m not interested in (the latter). I’m interested in using my platform as one of a very small group of African-American males to design [for a fashion] house, to sort of show people in a poetic way.

— Virgil Abloh (2018)

Abloh was featured in conversation with his friend and frequent collaborator Takashi Murakami on the cover of the fall 2018 issue of Cultured magazine.

In 2019, Abloh was appointed to the board of directors of The Council of Fashion Designers of America. The council seeks to promote the American fashion industry.

Abloh created a custom Off-White gown and veil for Hailey Bieber's wedding day. On the veil, he included his famous quotation marks design around the words "till death do us part".

In July 2021, LVMH Moët Hennessy Louis Vuitton announced it would be taking a 60% stake in Off-White, with founder Abloh, then the creative director of menswear for Louis Vuitton, retaining the remaining 40%. At the same time, Abloh was given greater creative control across the LVMH brand.

=== Art ===
Abloh worked frequently with Japanese artist Takashi Murakami. Abloh was given a solo art show in Murakami's Kaikai Kiki art gallery in Tokyo, Japan. Pieces of their artwork were showcased together at the Museum of Contemporary Art, Chicago and Murakami's shop Oz Zingaro in Tokyo. In 2018, Abloh and Murakami collaborated on a series of exhibitions at Gagosian Gallery's outposts in London, Paris, and Beverly Hills. In 2019, Abloh introduced the MCA speech campaign for the CTA's Red Line train wrap.

Abloh showcased an installation and billboard commission at the Spazio Maiocchi in Milan, Italy where he gave a speech on streetwear becoming "...the next global art movement”. Abloh's first solo art exhibition occurred at the Museum of Contemporary Art in Chicago in 2019. This show featured a large scale sculpture of Kanye West's Yeezus cover art and repeated photographs of Chief Keef wearing a Supreme t-shirt designed by Abloh. After Chicago, Virgil Abloh: Figures of Speech traveled to the High Museum of Art, the Institute of Contemporary Art/Boston, and Qatar Museums, as part of the Qatar-USA 2021 Year of Culture. The exhibition was intended to offer a mid-career retrospective of Abloh's endeavors in art, design and music. The Brooklyn Museum displayed Figures of Speech from July 1, 2022 – January 29, 2023. Brooklyn's edition of the exhibition spanned the two decades of the artist's practice, including collaborations with artist Takashi Murakami, musician Kanye West, and architect Rem Koolhaas, among others; material from his fashion label Off-White; and items from Louis Vuitton, where he served as the first Black menswear artistic director. The installation also offered a space for gathering and performances, designed to counter the historical lack of space afforded to Black artists and Black people in cultural institutions.

The Museum of Modern Art has Abloh's works in its collection, and several of these pieces were featured in Pirouette: Turning Points in Design, a 2025 exhibition of "widely recognized design icons [...] highlighting pivotal moments in design history."

Between 2025 and 2026, Virgil Abloh's work was included in the exhibition Get in the Game: Sports, Art, Culture, which traveled from the San Francisco Museum of Modern Art (SFMoMA), California, to the Pérez Art Museum Miami, Florida.

=== Music ===
Abloh's interest in music led him to DJing beginning in his teens. He DJ'd at house parties throughout high school and college. His influences included DJ's A-Trak, Benji B, and Gilles Peterson. Over the years, Abloh gained recognition as a DJ and started playing shows internationally. He played at Hi Ibiza and was also booked for the 2019 edition of the Tomorrowland festival. Abloh released his first single "Orvnge" with German DJ/producer Boys Noize in January 2018. In June 2019, Abloh was named to a DJ residency at Wynn Las Vegas's XS Nightclub, with Wynn also agreeing to open an Off-White store.

In May 2019 Pioneer, maker of DJ consoles, announced its collaboration with Abloh in design of its transparent CDJ-2000NXS2 and DJM-900NXS2 models. The consoles were displayed at Chicago's Museum of Contemporary Art in the Figures of Speech Exhibition.

In June 2020, Abloh designed the original cover for Pop Smoke album, Shoot for the Stars, Aim for the Moon. The original cover came under heavy criticism from fans. On July 2, a new cover, designed by Ryder Ripps, was revealed along with the album's release. Abloh also worked on album art for artists ASAP Rocky, Lil Uzi Vert's Luv Is Rage 2, Kanye West's Yeezus, Kid Cudi, Travis Scott and Westside Gunn.

In 2021, he launched a new monthly two-hour internet radio show on Worldwide FM, "Imaginary Radio" c/o Virgil Abloh. The show featured DJ sets and interviews with musicians and other creatives; early guests included artists like electronic artist Omar-S and Alex Sowinski of BadBadNotGood. He previously had a show on Apple Music 1 called "TELEVISED RADIO". Five episodes were released between 2018 and 2020.

In 2021, the Museum of Modern Art published "You Can Do It Too": Songs for, by, and with Virgil Abloh.

== Views ==
Abloh noted that one of his principles is that a new design can be created by changing an original by only three percent. He described his approach as being "ironic detachment" and that Duchamp's precedent "gives him the grounds to copy and paste, to take and to re-apply". This philosophy caused Abloh to be accused of plagiarism and appropriation.

The originality of Off-White's logo design with its alternating parallel diagonal lines has been contested by a number of parties, including Ben Kelly, who popularized this graphic in the early 1980s. Fashion blog Diet Prada has compared several of Abloh's designs, from chairs to apparel, with existing designs.

Abloh's fall/winter 2019 collection was based on his "ultimate muse", Michael Jackson. The launch occurred one week prior to the release of Leaving Neverland at the Sundance Film Festival. In response, Louis Vuitton announced they would not produce any items that directly featured Michael Jackson elements. Abloh also received criticism in early 2019 when images of his Off-White team suggested a lack of cultural diversity at his head office.

In 2019, LVMH recorded a 20% growth in sales that were in part attributed to his appointment. However, in December 2019 Abloh predicted that streetwear would die in 2020 as people moved to vintage clothing. On the March 2020 launch of his collaboration with Japanese streetwear designer Nigo, Abloh retracted his earlier comments clarifying that he was only riffing, describing himself as a novice.

During the George Floyd protests in mid-2020, Abloh attracted criticism after posting on social media a screenshot showing that he had made a $50 donation to Miami-based art collective (F)empower to go towards protesters' legal costs, adding that he was "crazy inspired". He later said on Instagram that "I can understand your frustration if you think my contributions were limited to $50... [that is] purely false when it comes to the total. I have donated $20,500 to bail funds and other causes related to this movement," and continued, "I will continue to donate more and will continue to use my voice to urge my peers to do the same." Abloh also subsequently stated that the looting of businesses during the George Floyd protests was an example of why streetwear "is dead".

== Philanthropy ==
In 2020, he established the Virgil Abloh "Post-Modern" Scholarship Fund. Abloh raised $1 million for the scholarships which will be managed by the Fashion Scholarship Fund to assist Black students. In July 2020, Abloh's brand Off-White launched a fundraising program called "I Support Young Black Businesses" that sold Hoodies and T-shirts with "I Support Young Black Businesses" written on them. All of those proceeds went to an organization called Chicago CRED, aimed to diminish gun violence. Also that year, with Nike he finished the redesign and renovations of the Boys and Girls Club facility in East Garfield Park, Chicago. Abloh spent significant amounts of his time to mentor and provide mentoring resources to young designers.

== Awards and honors ==
Abloh received his first major award in 2011 when his work designing the cover art for American rappers Jay-Z and Kanye West's collaborative album Watch the Throne was nominated for a Grammy Award for Best Recording Package. In 2015, Abloh (for Off-White) was one of the finalists for the LVMH Prize. Abloh was the only American designer to be nominated for the award that year. Abloh's Charlie Hebdo-inspired "War is Not Over!" tees as well as his toppers from his fall 2015 women's collection gained him the most traction. He received the Urban Luxe award at the 2017 British Fashion Awards. He also won International designer of the Year at the GQ Men of the Year awards in 2017. Abloh's Off-White Air Jordan "the Ten" collaboration won 2017's Shoe of the Year and he received the nod for Accessory Designer of the Year. Abloh was listed as one of Time magazine's 100 most influential people in the world in 2018, one of two designers named that year. In the Time issue, Japanese artist Takashi Murakami wrote that Abloh's impressive achievements led to his listing. In December 2018, Abloh was honored as a leading innovator by Ebony Power 100. Abloh was also nominated for 2019 Menswear Designer of the Year. As a tribute to Abloh, Kid Cudi released an album titled Entergalactic, which was released on his birthday September 30. In 2025, a retrospective exhibition of Abloh's work, Virgil Abloh: The Codes, was held at the Grand Palais in Paris during Paris Fashion Week.

== Personal life and death ==
Abloh met his wife, Shannon Sundberg, in high school, where they began dating. After 10 years of dating, Abloh and Sundberg married in Chicago in 2009. Abloh lived in Chicago with his wife and their two children.

In 2019, Abloh was diagnosed with cardiac angiosarcoma, a rare type of cancer, though he kept the diagnosis private. He died on November 28, 2021, at the age of 41, in Chicago. With the family's permission, LVMH paid tribute to Abloh at their planned November 30 spin-out fashion show in Miami, with a theme of "Virgil was here". Kanye West, Kim Kardashian, Rihanna, ASAP Rocky, Bella Hadid, Pharrell Williams, Tahar Rahim, Venus Williams, Joe Jonas, Ricky Martin, Jeremy Pope, 21 Savage, Joan Smalls, and Bernard Arnault attended the tribute. Louis Vuitton dedicated its window displays worldwide, also using the dedication "Virgil was here".

Kanye West later led a tribute to Abloh at his Sunday Service event with the song "Easy on Me" by Adele on November 28, 2021.

Abloh's funeral service took place on December 6, 2021, in Chicago, with Drake, Rihanna, West, Kardashian, Kid Cudi, Tyler, the Creator, A$AP Rocky, Frank Ocean, Vic Mensa, Lauryn Hill, Don C, and Jerry Lorenzo in attendance among his family and other close friends.

In March 2022, Lil Durk and Gunna paid tribute to Virgil with the song "What Happened to Virgil".

== Books ==
- Insert Complicated Title Here (2018)
- Virgil Abloh. Nike. ICONS (2020)
- Abloh-isms (2021)
- Virgil Abloh: Figures of Speech (2022)

== See also ==
- Pirouette: Turning Points in Design – 2025 exhibition at the Museum of Modern Art
