= Gold teeth =

Form of dental prosthesis

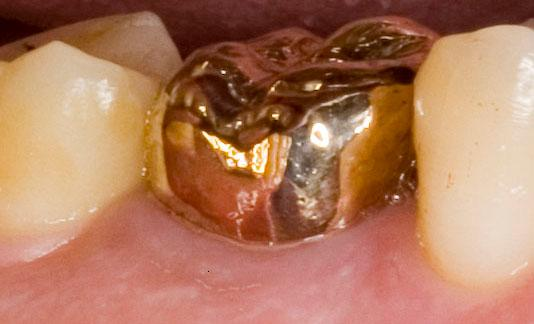
A gold first molar crown

Gold teeth are a form of dental prosthesis where the visible part of a tooth is replaced or capped with a prosthetic molded from gold.

== History ==
The first printed book on dentistry, Artzney Buchlein (or The Little Pharmacopaeia), was published by Michael Blum in 1530 in Leipzig. The book provides advice on treating tooth decay, recommending cleaning the cavity and filling it with gold leaf. This advice is attributed to Mesue, though his identity is uncertain. The use of gold leaf for dental fillings was confirmed by earlier Renaissance figures like Giovanni d'Arcoli and Giovanni da Vigo.

Gold dental appliances have gone in and out of popularity as a status symbol for many years. Archeologists also found gold dental appliances from the Etruscan people of Italy, as early as 630 BCE, interpreting them to be some of the earliest forms of bridges and replacement teeth. Gold wire was used in dentistry in ancient times, and for filling cavities in the 19th century. Gold is suitable for dentistry because it is malleable, nearly immune to corrosion, and closely mimics the hardness of natural teeth, thereby causing no harm to natural teeth during chewing. Gold was used before silver became available and has continued to be used for specialized purposes. Dental restorations are often made from a combination of precious metals.

As the dental industry adopted CAD/CAM processes for most of the crown and bridge fabrication, gold manufacturing still relied on the ancient "lost wax" technique, which requires a significant amount of time, skill, and labor. Recent developments have seen the advent of CAD/CAM milling of 100 mm diameter pucks of dental alloy to facilitate the direct milling of crowns and bridges from the solid puck. This effectively eliminated the risk and difficulty of the lost wax process and simultaneously improved upon the quality of the devices.

=== United States ===
Gold alloys are still used by dentists today. They most often combine gold with other metals such as palladium, nickel, or chromium to increase the strength of the crown.

Gold teeth were first present in America during the Jim Crow era. Originally, it had become a tradition in Louisiana before becoming a fashion trend around the Deep South region in the early 1900s. After slavery, it was believed that many African Americans who were former slaves began getting the permanent gold caps to replace their rotting teeth that have deteriorated. It later became a symbol of wealth for ex-slaves who once worked on the plantation fields in the South, specifically Louisiana, where it first become a tradition. Blues, jazz and freed slaves who had money would get the permanent gold cap fillings as a fashion statement as flaunted by Jack Johnson, the first black heavyweight boxing champion.

==== Historical information ====
"In the 1800s, dentists started to use gold as material for filling teeth." Gold fillings are thought to be older than "amalgam fillings, and by extension, that makes them much older than composite or porcelain fillings."

According to The Wall Street Journal, Dr. Ruchi Sahota, a dentist in Fremont, California, reported that gilded canines and incisors were common throughout the early and mid 1900s. “Gold was used very, very often, for routine dental procedures" for people.

Britannica cites American dentist William Taggart who in 1907 introduced a precision machine that allowed dentists to create gold restorations with minimal tooth removal."

== Current use ==
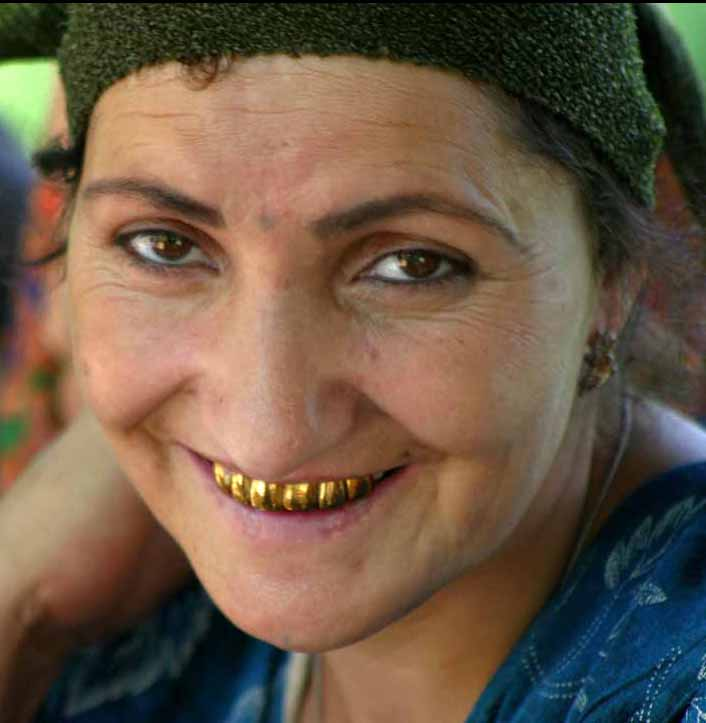
A woman with gold teeth from Tajikistan, where they are considered a symbol of wealth

Gold teeth are worn as a status symbol in many regions of the post-Soviet Union including Russia, the Caucasus (Chechnya, Ingushetia, and Dagestan), and Central Asia (Kazakhstan, Uzbekistan, Turkmenistan, and Kyrgyzstan). They are considered a symbol of wealth and sometimes installed in the place of healthy teeth or as crowns over filed-down healthy teeth.

Gold teeth have been taken as war trophies in many modern conflicts, including the Second Chechen War and the Russo-Ukrainian War. For example, during the Novye Aldi massacre, golden teeth were pulled out of Chechen victims’ mouths. Likewise, during the Russo-Ukrainian War, golden teeth were supposedly extracted from Ukrainian prisoners' mouths by Russian forces near Pisky-Radkivski. A box full of golden tooth caps was discovered by Ukrainian troops when the village was recaptured.

=== Grills ===
Grills, false tooth covers made of metal, have become a popular hip hop fashion in the United States since the 1980s in New York City. In the early 2000s, grills were again popularized in hip hop videos by Nelly, Three 6 Mafia, Lil Wayne, Ludacris, Paul Wall, and other rappers from the southern U.S. Gold grills are still being sported by rappers today and even include diamonds of various colors. Grills were also worn by Miley Cyrus, Beyoncé, and Madonna. While some rap musicians have had their gold teeth permanently attached to existing teeth, most people who purchase them for aesthetic purposes opt for removable gold teeth caps. In 2005, Nelly released the rap single "Grillz" which promotes the dental procedure.

== See also ==
- Dental restoration
- Grill
- Prosthodontics
- Status symbol
