= New Guards Group =

Italian fashion company

New Guards Group Holding S.p.A.
- Type: Società per azioni Holding company
- Industry: Fashion
- Founded: 2015; 11 years ago in Milan, Italy
- Founders: Claudio Antonioli; Davide De Giglio; Marcelo Burlon
- Headquarters: Milan, Italy
- Area served: Worldwide
- Parent: Farfetch
- Subsidiaries: Off-White
- Website: newguardsgroup.com

New Guards Group is an Italian contemporary luxury fashion production and distribution holding company co-founded in Milan, Italy in 2015 by Claudio Antonioli, Davide De Giglio and Marcelo Burlon.

== History ==
The company was founded in 2015 by Claudio Antonioli, Davide De Giglio and Marcelo Burlon.

In December 2017, the company acquired an undisclosed stake in knitwear label, Alanui.

In March 2018, Anna Blessmann fashion label, A Plan Application, joined the company with graphic artist Peter Saville.

In March 2019, Peggy Gou joined the roster of labels with her new clothing line, Kirin.

In August 2019, Farfetch purchased the group for a total of US$675 million.

== Portfolio ==
- Marcelo Burlon County of Milan
- Off-White
- Palm Angels
- Unravel Project
- Hood By Air
- A Plan Application
- Alanui
- Kirin by Peggy Gou
- Opening Ceremony
- Ambush
