= Tosh Basco =

American performance artist

Tosh Basco, known professionally as boychild (stylized in lowercase), is an American performance artist, dancer, and photographer.

Basco is nonbinary and transgender, and has stated that the boychild performance persona is characterized as female in order to explore gender expression. Her work often includes lip-sync performances to distorted music tracks, incorporating visual elements such as full-body makeup, shaved head, colored contact lenses, and dramatic lighting. Basco is based in California and Hong Kong.

== Career ==
Basco was born in Sacramento, California, and raised in San Francisco during the 1990s. She began exploring drag early on, and cites performance artist Dia Dear as an early influence. The boychild persona was first performed publicly in 2012 in San Francisco's drag and nightlife scene.

Basco has noted that although boychild incorporates elements of drag, the character is not intended to be a traditional drag queen. Instead, the work is informed by a variety of cultural sources, including studies of clowns, healers, shamans, and ritual practices.

Her performances frequently reference themes such as cyborgs and posthumanism. Some performances are presented as one-time-only events. Nightlife spaces are often chosen as performance venues, which Basco has described as integral to the context and meaning of her work.

In 2013, boychild appeared in Hood By Air's Spring/Summer fashion show alongside rapper A$AP Rocky. That same year, Basco toured with musician Mykki Blanco.

Since 2013, Basco has regularly collaborated with artist and filmmaker Wu Tsang. Together, they have created projects under the collective name *Moved by the Motion*, which includes other artists such as cellist Patrick Belaga, dancer Josh Johnson, musician Asma Maroof, and poet Fred Moten.

== Exhibitions and performances ==
Boychild's performances have been shown at institutions and events including the Gropius Bau, Venice Biennale, Biennale of Sydney, Whitney Museum of American Art, MoMA PS1, San Francisco Museum of Modern Art, Museum of Contemporary Art, Chicago, Museum of Contemporary Art, Los Angeles, the Stedelijk Museum in Amsterdam, ICA London, EMPAC, and the Berlin club Berghain.

Several of her performances are part of an ongoing series titled #Untitled Lip-Sync, which combines choreographed movement, makeup, lighting, and sound.
