= Ticket to Ride (video game) =

Video game version of board game

- Logo for the Xbox 360 "Classic Edition"
- Developers: Next Level Games (XBLA-Classic); Marmalade Game Studio (2024-Current); Days of Wonder (2024-Current); Asmodee (2024-Current); Twin Sails Interactive (2024-Current)
- Publishers: Valve Corporation (Windows PC-Classic); Discord (Windows PC-Classic); Epic Games (Windows PC-Classic); Microsoft Game Studios (XBLA-Classic); Days of Wonder (XBLA-Classic); Playful Entertainment (XBLA-Classic)
- Platforms: Steam (PC and Mac); Xbox (XBox 360 and XBox one); PlayStation; Google Play (Android); Apple iOS (IPad, IPhone, and IPod Touch); Nintendo Switch
- Release: Release Dates: 15 November 2004 (Java Scripted Browser); 7 January 2006 (Apple Mactingtosh); 21 February 2006 (Windows PC); 25 June 2008 (XBox); 19 May 2011 (iPad); 16 November 2011 (IPhone/IPod); 5 June 2013 (Android); 15 October 2013 (Linux); 13 November 2018; 3 August 2012 (Mac OS X); 10 December 2019 (Windows App); 14 November 2018 (Alexa); 28 September 2022 (Board Game Arena); 2024 (Tabletop Simulator)
- Genre: Turn-based strategy
- Modes: Single-player, multiplayer

The term Ticket to Ride Video Game is a general description for any digital game that emulates the games of the Ticket to Ride board game franchise created by Alan R. Moon. The video games are based on that franchise's maps, with the same rules. The current edition is available on six of the major platforms, i.e. PlayStation, Xbox (Xbox 360 and Xbox one), Steam (PC and Mac), Google Play, Apple iOS (IPad, IPhone, and IPod Touch), and Nintendo Switch, and was developed by Marmalade Game Studio, Days of Wonder, Asmodee and Twin Sails Interactive, a rebranding of the delisted original release by Twin Sails Interactive., now known as the "Classic Edition".

== Java-scripted browser ==
On 15 November 2004, Days of Wonder developed and produced a web-based java-scripted browser, entitled Ticket to Ride Online,

=== Reception ===
On VideoGameGeek, the web browser version holds a rank of the 7th best browser game out of the 82 browser games considered, receiving an average rating of 7.058 and an "Adjusted Geek" rating of 7.65 from the response of 465 voting users to the game's general digital translation.

== Personal computers ==
=== Macintosh and Windows ===
==== Classic edition ====
The versions for personal computers with an Apple Macintosh or Microsoft Windows operating system were based on the prior Java-scripted browser version. These games boasted a functionality for four possible artificial intelligence (AI) players, known as "Robots", in totally local unranked games; or online games with multiple players on different accounts. The game was rated "E", for "Everyone", by the Entertainment Software Rating Board.

For the Apple Macintosh, Days of Wonder released the computer game on 7 January 2006. This version ran on Mac OSX 10.3+ and required Java On 4 April 2012, version 1.0 had its initial Mac App Store release.

For Microsoft Windows, Days of Wonder released the computer game on 21 February 2006, running on an OpenGL-enabled graphic driver. Subsequently, a variety of releases were made with different distributors, Valve Corporation (24 May 2012), Discord (16 October 2018), and Epic Games (6 February 2020).

The software was available on CD or downloadable content. In 2007, on this browser version, there had been over 7 million games played; a new game starting every 13 seconds; and an active global community of over 50,000 players. The downloadable content for the "Classic Edition" on Steam, an online distributor for Apple Macintosh and Microsoft Windows personal computers software included:

"Classic Edition" content that was downloadable for Apple Macintosh and Microsoft Windows
Game title	Content	Release date	Ref.
Ticket to Ride	Core Original United States map Game	1 July 2006 (CD); 24 May 2012 (Stream)	
Ticket to Ride - USA 1910	Original United States map expansions, including: 1910 Expansion; MegaGame; Big Cities	1 July 2006 (CD)	
Ticket to Ride - Europe	Additional Europe map	1 July 2006 (CD); 24 May 2012 (Steam)	
Ticket to Ride - Switzerland ^{†}	Additional Switzerland map	1 July 2006 (CD); 24 May 2012 (Steam)	
Ticket to Ride - Legendary Asia	Additional Legendary Asia map	2 August 2012	
Ticket to Ride - India	Additional India map	19 November 2015	
Ticket to Ride - Nordic Countries	Additional Nordic Countries map	25 April 2016	
Ticket to Ride - Pennsylvania	Additional Pennsylvania map	1 September 2016	
Ticket to Ride - Germany	Additional Germany map	20 December 2016	
Ticket to Ride - United Kingdom	Additional United Kingdom map	15 November 2017	
Ticket to Ride - First Journey	Additional First Journey (United States) map	27 September 2017	
Ticket to Ride - France	Additional France map	19 December 2018	

† - In July 2006, the Switzerland map was only initially featured in the video game, before eventually being released as a physical version of the game in October 2007.

On 27 September 2023, with the delisting of all the "Classic Edition" version, it was announced that these then existing title would be sunsetted, to make way for a new and current version developed by Marmalade Game Studio. Sales of this "Classic Edition" ceased when it was delisted from storefronts on 3 October 2023, and the online functionality was discontinued in 2024.

==== Current edition ====
The Marmalade Game Studio version for Apple Macintosh and Microsoft Windows personal computers was released on 14 November 2023. The new adaptation of the computer game had new 3D graphics and animations as well as AI opponents with “adaptive” difficulty level based on the gameplay of over a hundred real-life “master” Ticket to Ride players and millions of simulated matches. A base game, the Original United States map and/or Europe map, could be purchased along with nine other map expansions, which could be bought separately or as part of a Ticket to Ride - Round the World Ticket Pack. The core versions and additional maps could be bought together in a package known as a "Ticket to Ride: Deluxe Edition".

Steam downloadable content
Game title	Content	Release date	Ref.
Ticket to Ride	Core Original (United States) map	14 November 2023	
Ticket to Ride - Europe Expansion	Additional Europe map including expansion: Europa 1912 ^{†}	18 December 2023	
Ticket to Ride - USA 1910 Ticket Pack	Original (United States) map expansions: USA 1910 Expansion; Big Cities Expansion; Mega Game	30 May 2024	
Ticket to Ride - Nordic Expansion	Additional Nordic Countries map	20 March 2024	
Ticket to Ride - India Expansion	Additional India map	27 June 2024	
Ticket to Ride - Legendary Asia Expansion	Additional Legendary Asia map	3 September 2024	
Ticket to Ride - San Francisco City Expansion	Additional San Francisco map	31 October 2024	
Ticket to Ride - Switzerland Expansion	Additional Switzerland map	10 December 2024	
Ticket to Ride - Switzerland Expansion	Additional Switzerland map	10 December 2024	
Ticket to Ride - Japan Expansion	Additional Japan map	10 December 2024	
Ticket to Ride - Heart of Africa Expansion	Additional Africa map	21 August 2025	
Ticket to Ride - Germany Expansion	Additional Germany map	12 December 2025	

† - The Europa 1912 expansion was added on 30 May 2024 at the same time that the USA 1910 Ticket Pack was released.

==== Reception ====
In 2011, it was reported by Days of Wonder that 23 million games of Ticket to Ride had been played online through Apple Macintosh and Microsoft Windows personal computers. The "Classic Edition" received mixed reviews on Steam upon release due to technical issues and a lack of features compared to the previous version. However, after release, the game received generally favourable reviews. When giving this product a 5 out of 5, Bruce Geryk (Computer Gaming World) wrote "Board game ports have a pretty dismal history - and Ticket to Ride might just be the revolution. ... Perhaps the most amazing thing about this game is that it may actually play better on the PC." Shannon Appelcline (RPG), whilst giving the game a 4 for style and a 5 for substance, wrote "This CD version has a nicer interface and bigger maps, and also supports a totally new board: Switzerland. It also integrates well with the online site, making it really easy to play Ticket to Ride in a variety of forms. The new Switzerland map is well worth the price of admission alone, while everything else is a nice bonus." Simon Smith (Higher Plain Music), wrote "A competent and more than functional rendition of a classic board game and with online features should really be part of everyone's PC collection if they like a little of bit of PG-rated strategy."

Upon release on Steam, the subsequent and current edition of the Ticket to Ride video game for Apple Macintosh and Microsoft Windows received 'mixed' reviews, with only just over half of players giving it a positive review, with the common criticisms being its higher costs; propensity to crash; lack of features, including end-game scoring; cluttered user interface; and time consuming animations, compared to the "Classic Edition".

On VideoGameGeek, from a 465 voting user-strong survey on the game's digital translation generally, the Windows PC version received a rank of the 212th best Windows game out of a total of 3,044 Windows games considered, with an average rating of 7.319 and an "Adjusted Geek" rating of 7.65., whilst the Macintosh version received a 116th best Macintosh game rank out of a total of 1,134 Macintosh games surveyed, with an average rating of 7.331 and an "Adjusted Geek" rating of 7.65.

=== Linux ===
The Linux version of Ticket to Ride was released on 15 October 2013. In February 2017, Days of Wonder abandoned Linux support when the games were removed from users' libraries, without an official announcement, thus preventing them from playing their purchased Ticket to Ride games. On 23 February 2017, Days of Wonder's technical support department wrote "We have no plans to update the app with new expansions on Linux, but you should still be able to play on Linux." On 2 September 2020, Asmodee officially dropped Linux support due to the very small number of Linux players and the amount of resources required to keep the Linux versions up to date.

==== Reception ====
On VideoGameGeek, the short-lived Linux adaptation of the game holds a rank of the 7th best Linux scripted game out of the 517 Linux games surveyed, receiving an average rating of 7.133, and an "Adjusted Geek" rating of 7.65, from a general survey on the game's digital translation of 465 voting users.

== Game consoles ==
=== Microsoft - Xbox ===
==== Classic edition ====
Gameplay screenshot

On 25 June 2008, the initial version of digital version of Ticket to Ride, now known as the classic edition, was released onto Xbox Live Arcade. The platform was developed by Twin Sails Interactive. The game was advertised as having a variety of functionalities, including variable difficulty levels; multiplayer capability (Up to 4 players with a single console and 5 players with Xbox Live); leaderboards and achievements; and camera support (Xbox Live Vision cam). The game was rated "E" for "Everyone" by North America's Entertainment Software Rating Board and "G" for "General" by the Australia's Office of Film and Literature Classification (OFLC). Xbox Live Arcade featured downloadable Ticket to Ride Board developed by Next Level Games and published by Microsoft Game Studios, Days of Wonder, and Playful Entertainment. The core map was the original (United States 1910) game map, onto which a variety of additional maps could be added, either purchased separately of together as part of an additional "First Class Pack" bundle. On 17 June 2024, the classic edition was removed from the Xbox store and the game servers, preventing online play and all other online services, e.g. chat etc., however, offline play as well as the Pass & Play mode was still available, as long as the game was owned, and DLCs were still accessible. The current edition was developed by Marmalade Game Studio, Days of Wonder, Asmodee and Twin Sails Interactive.

Xbox downloadable content
Game title	Content	Release date	Ref.
Ticket to Ride	Core Original (United States) map game The Twin Sails re-release contained the Original (United States) map expansions: USA 1910 Expansion; Big Cities Expansion; Mega Game	25 June 2008 (original); 10 December 2019 (Twin Sails Re-release)	
1910 Expansion ^{†}	Original (United States) map expansions: USA 1910; Big Cities; Mega Game	17 September 2008 (original)	
Ticket to Ride - Europe	Additional Ticket to Ride - Europe map The Twin Sails re-release contained the Europe map expansion: Europa 1912	01 October 2008 (original); 10 December 2019 (Twin Sails re-release)	
Ticket to Ride - Switzerland	Additional Switzerland map	1 August 2008 (original); 10 December 2019 (Twin Sails re-release)	
Ticket to Ride - India	Additional India map	10 December 2019	
Ticket to Ride - Legendary Asia	Additional Legendary Asia map	10 December 2019	
Ticket to Ride - United Kingdom	Additional United Kingdom map	10 December 2019	
Volume 5: United Kingdom + Pennsylvania	Additional Pennsylvania map	10 December 2019	
Ticket to Ride - Germany	Additional Germany map	10 December 2019	
Ticket to Ride - Nordic countries	Additional Nordic Countries map	10 December 2019	
Ticket to Ride - France	Additional France map	10 December 2019	

† - This expansion added 35 new destination tickets and the Globetrotter bonus card.

On 10 December 2019, a version for Xbox One developed by Days of Wonder and published by Asmodee Digital SA. The classic version was removed from the store on 17 June 2024.

==== Current edition ====
The "Current Version", developed and produced by Marmalade Game Studio, for the XBox was released on 24 July 2024. This version was released as a core map (United States 1910), upon which a variety of additional maps could be purchased, either separately or as part of a "Round the World Ticket" bundle. The core game, along with the expansions and additional maps, could be purchased together as a complete package called the "Deluxe Edition".

Current Xbox versions accessible via Microsoft's Xbox Store
Game title	Content	Release date	Ref.
Ticket to Ride	Core Original (United States) map game and an additional Europe map	24 July 2024	
Ticket to Ride: USA 1910 & Europa 1912 Ticket Packs	Original (United States) map expansions: USA 1910 Expansion; Big Cities Expansion; Mega Game; Europe map expansion: Europa 1912	24 July 2024	
Ticket to Ride: Nordic Expansion	Additional Nordic Countries map	24 July 2024	
Ticket to Ride: India Expansion	Additional India map	24 July 2024	
Ticket to Ride: Legendary Asia Expansion	Additional Legendary Asia map	3 September 2024	
Ticket to Ride: The San Francisco City Expansion	Additional San Francisco map	31 October 2024	
Ticket to Ride: Switzerland Expansion	Additional Switzerland map	15 December 2024	
Ticket to Ride: Japan Expansion	Additional Japan map	10 April 2025	
Ticket to Ride: Heart of Africa Expansion	Additional Africa map	20 August 2025	
Ticket to Ride: Germany Expansion	Additional Germany map	11 December 2025	

==== Reception ====
This version received a 6.5 out of 10 on IGN, where Nate Ahearn wrote, "The biggest problem that most will have with Ticket to Ride is that it's slow, but that's inherent to board games themselves. The multiplayer is decent and the strategy elements are good and reasonably deep. Now if only Playful Entertainment (the developer) had included a single-player game with more life and depth than a standard bot match with varying difficulty, then maybe Ticket to Ride would have turned a few more heads. Instead, it's a decent XBLA offering that will be enjoyed by fans of the genre." The classic Xbox 360 version received "average" reviews, according to the review aggregation website Metacritic, ultimately receiving a 70 out of 100. This product received the following scores from the critics:

Critics scores for the Xbox game
Title	Score	Ref.
Eurogamer	7/10	
GamePro Arcade	2.75/5	
GameSpot	7/10	
IGN	6.5/10	
Official Xbox Magazine	7/10	
Push Square	6/10	
TeamXbox	7.9/10	
The A.V. Club	B	

On VideoGameGeek, the translation of the game to Xbox 360 currently has an average rating of 7.129, and an "Adjusted Geek" rating of 7.65 from a responses from 465 voting users about the digital version in general, holding a rank of 120th best Xbox game out of the 940 Xbox games considered in the ranking.

=== Nintendo - PlayStation and Switch ===
On 13 November 2018, a version was released on PlayLink for PlayStation 4. The game console version for both platform was developed by Twin Sails Interactive. The titles could be bought as a "First Class Pack", containing all of the maps available on that games console., or alternatively, each map could be purchase separately in the form of individual downloadable content:

"Classic" content that was accessible via the PlayStation Store
Game title	Content	Release date	Ref.
United States	Core Original (United States) map game	13 November 2018	
Ticket to Ride - Europe	Additional Europe map	13 November 2018	
Ticket to Ride - Switzerland	Additional Switzerland map	13 November 2018	
Ticket to Ride - Nordic countries	Additional Nordic Countries map	13 November 2018	
Ticket to Ride - Germany	Additional Germany map	13 November 2018	
Ticket to Ride - United Kingdom	Additional United Kingdom map	13 November 2018	
Volume 5: United Kingdom + Pennsylvania	Additional Pennsylvania map	13 November 2018	
Ticket to Ride - Legendary Asia	Additional Legendary Asia map	13 November 2018	
Ticket to Ride - India	Additional India map	13 November 2018	
Ticket to Ride - France	Additional France map	13 November 2018	

In 2023, it was announced that the above titles, now called "classic versions", were all to be delisted from their respective stores and servers in April 2024, for both the xBox and Playstation. Support for online play was discontinued on 3 April 2024. The elimination of server hosted online play affected all versions of the app on all iOS devices, however, the local network play, solo, and Pass-and-Play would continue to function. The practical implication was the existing owners retained access to the game in their game library, it meant the loss any of the possible 69 trophies (including the platinum). Each of the products quoted 17 June 2024 as the date it would be delisted for playstation and xBox.

==== Current version ====
On 8 August 2024, a version of Ticket to Ride was also released for Nintendo Switch, the sixth platform Ticket to Ride was available on. The core game was the original (United States) map to which various additional expansions and maps could be added, all of which could be bought together in a bundle called "Round the World Ticket". The core map, expansions ans maps could all be purchased together in a bundle called the "Deluxe Edition".

The core game consists of the original Ticket to Ride map and "Ticket to Ride - Europe" map. Additional expansions and maps can be purchased separately on together in a bundle known as a "Round the World Ticket". The core game and the expansion and maps could be purchased together in the "Deluxe Edition".

Downloadable content via the Nintendo Store
Content	Game title	Release date			
Content	Game title	PlayStation	Ref.	Switch	Ref.
Ticket to Ride	Core Original (United States) map and Ticket to Ride - Europe and Europe map games	18 July 2024		8 August 2024	
Ticket to Ride: USA 1910 & Europa 1912 Ticket Packs; Ticket to Ride: 1910 & 1912 Ticket Pack Bundle	Original (United States) map expansions: USA 1910; Big Cities; Mega Game; Europe map expansion: Europa 1912; Ticket to Ride (Original) map expansions: USA 1910 Expansion; Europe map expansions: Europa 1912	19 July 2024		8 August 2024	
Ticket to Ride: India Expansion	Additional India map	19 July 2024		8 August 2024	
Ticket to Ride: The Nordic Expansion	Additional Nordic countries map	20 July 2024		8 August 2024	
Ticket to Ride: Legendary Asia Expansion	Additional Legendary Asia map	3 September 2024		31 October 2024	
Ticket to Ride: The San Francisco City Expansion	Additional San Francisco map	31 October 2024		28 November 2024	
Ticket to Ride: Switzerland Expansion	Additional Switzerland map	16 December 2024		13 January 2025	
Ticket to Ride: Japan Expansion	Additional Japan map	10 April 2025		15 April 2025	
Ticket to Ride: Heart of Africa	Additional Africa map	20 August 2025		21 August 2025	
Ticket to Ride: Germany Expansion	Additional Germany map	11 December 2025		6 January 2026 (Pending)	

==== Reception ====
Upon its initial release, the PlayStation's classic edition received positive reviews, noting some drawbacks. Graham Banas (Push Square), who gave the product a 6 out of 10, describing it as "rather rough", wrote "The biggest problem ultimately is that if you don't like the standard rules or play differently in person, then that's too bad. Some custom options would have been a welcome addition and allowed even more fun to be squeezed out of the game. But if you're looking for a quick, get-in, get-out play session of a great board game in digital form, you could do worse than Ticket to Ride. Criticism was leveled on the PlayStation version being twice the cost of its xBox counterpart. Matthew Pollesel (Gaming Age), whilst giving it a B+ grade, wrote "You're paying a PlayStation tax for an experience that's not really any different than you can get on a variety of other devices at a much cheaper price. If you've ever played the game anywhere else, this version probably isn't going to wow you."

On VideoGameGeek, the adaptation of the game to Playstation received a rank of the 151st best Playstation game out of the 688 PlayStation games surveyed, receiving an average rating of 7.058 and an "Adjusted Geek" rating of 7.65 from a general survey on the game's digital translation of 465 voting users.

The Nintendo Switch received luke warm responses. Matt S. (Digitally Downloaded), whilst giving this adaptation a 3.5 out of 5, wrote "It's very good that the Switch has Ticket To Ride, as it is a lovely, inoffensive, easy-playing board game. It's as accessible as something like Risk, Monopoly, or Catan, but less luck-based and therefore far less frustrating than those other games. Marmalade is a highly competent developer and while the presentation of the game isn't the most inspired, this is still going to be heavily in the rotation for multiplayer fun if your group has any interest in board games at all."

== Mobile apps ==
On 5 April 2012, the games became available through the Apple Mac store for the first time at a cost of €7.99/$9.99 (USD), enabling Mac users online play with opponents using Mac, PC, Linux, or even iPad. It was reported that 750,000 games of Ticket to Ride had been sold on iPad and iPhone, with over 20,000 five-star reviews from Apple Stores users.

=== iOS ===
==== Classic edition ====
The iPad version was released on 17 May 2011 and supports play with up to five people using the Game Center or Days of Wonder's own servers. Its offline mode originally only supported a single player with up to four computer players; however, pass and play was added later. The iPad version sold 100,000 copies in its first six months of release, a rate 17 times faster than the board game version. On 5 April 2012, Ticket to Ride became available for the first time in the Mac App store.

On 19 November 2015, with it 2.0 update, the iPad-only app was changed into a Universal one, including additional elements such as asynchronous and cross-platform play, a map of India, and a reworked UI. The iPhone version was released on 15 November 2011, which is a simplified version of the iPad game for $0.99 / €0.79 from the App Store. Online play was added as an update on 2 February 2012, and users could also play a multi-player game on a local network via WiFi or Bluetooth. On 23 February 2012, the United States 1910 expansion including the classic, mega, and big cities variants was released.

The company released a redesigned version of the digital game in November 2015. Upon the release of the iPhone version it has sold 100,000 copies in the first 30 days, a rate 40 times faster than the board game version.

The Ticket to Ride Ipad App was available from the ITunes App Store or $6.99 (USD). There were five additional map extensions released for $0.99 (USD) per map, which all included three separate game modes.

Classic version content downloadable on iOS
Game title	Content	Release date	Ref.
Ticket to Ride	Core original (United States) map game	5 April 2012	
Ticket to Ride - Europe	Core Europe map game	2 August 2012	
Ticket to Ride - Switzerland	Additional Switzerland map	2 August 2012	
Ticket to Ride - India	Additional India map	19 November 2015	
Ticket to Ride - Nordic Countries	Additional Nordic Countries map	April 2016	
Ticket to Ride - Legendary Asia	Additional Legendary Asia map	April 2016	
First Journey	Ticket to Ride: First Journey	27 September 2017	

==== Reception ====
The iPad's "classic" version received "universal acclaim" according to the review aggregation website Metacritic, ultimately receiving an Metacritic aggregation score of 91 out of 100. Shannon Appelcline (RPG), while giving the game a score of 5 out of 5 for both style and substance, wrote "Ticket to Ride for iPad shows that Days of Wonder is just as adept with creating games for the iPad as they are with creating games for the tabletop. Though the overall interface includes some quirks, the game itself is terrific: easy to play, relatively challenging whether you go with AIs or humans, and obvious to interact with." 'Ticket to Ride is what an iOS app should be. Graphics and animations make you feel that you are playing the real game with an online and local game play that gives you plenty of options. The addition of many maps for purchase and achievements will allow players to continue playing the solo mode even if the AI is a little lack luster. This is a great implementation of a board game to an iOS system and a fan of the board game should pick Ticket to Ride up." Whilst awarding it a 8.5 out of 10 on IGN, Audrey Drake wrote "Ticket to Ride is a great digital version of a fun and engaging board game. With an excellent tutorial system, easy-to-use controls, and delightful presentation, anyone looking for a new iPad addiction should definitely give this game a shot. The downside is that the multi-player mode is lacking, and local play is sorely missed. While this brings the experience down, Ticket to Ride is still a great download that is well worth the $7 price tag.". Chris Lee wrote "I love Ticket to Ride and I love the way the iPad version is laid out. Days of Wonder has come up with a fabulous ragtime theme from the end of the steam era. As a standalone game, this is a good time, but it's not a replacement for the board game, with its more social experience." This product received the following scores from the critics:

Critics scores for the iOS game
Title	Score	Ref.
Eurogamer	9/10	
Gamezebo	4.5/5	
IGN	8.5/10	
Metacritic	91/100	
Pocket Gamer	4.5/5	
RPG	style: 5/5 substance: 5/5	
TouchArcade	4.5/5	

Ticket to Ride Pocket won the following awards:

Accolades
Award	Date held	Category	Result	Ref.
Golden Pawn Award (Danish) - (Guldbrikken)	2011	Digital Game of the Year	Won	

Whilst awarding this adaption the Golden Pawn's "Digital Game of the Year" in 2011, it was written "the exemplar of how a board game makes the leap to the digital world without compromise. The iPad version dazzles with its superb finish, easy availability and unparalleled expandability, as well as the ability to play on just the iPad or over the Internet."

On VideoGameGeek, the IPad adaptation of the game holds a rank of the 29th best IPad game out of 520 games for the IPad surveyed, receiving an average rating of 7.440 and an "Adjusted Geek" rating of 7.65 from a general survey on the game's digital translation of 465 voting users.

==== Current edition ====
A new "current" edition was created for Apple products available through the Apple iOS store. The core original United States game could be added to with the purchase of a variety of maps and regional-themed map bundles, a bundle for all the additional maps could be purchased together in a bundle entitled Round the World.

Current version content downloadable from iOS
Game title	Content	Version added	Release date	Ref.
Ticket to Ride	Core Original (United States) map game	1.0.0	2024	
1910 Expansion Pack	Additional Europe-themed maps	1.0.0	2024	
Europe Expansion	Additional Europe map	1.0.0	18 December 2023	
Nordic Expansion	Additional Nordic countries map	1.2.0	20 March 2024	
1910 US Ticket Pack and 1912 Europa Ticket Pack	Ticket to Ride (Original) map expansions: USA 1910 Expansion; Europe map expansions: Europa 1912	1.3.0	30 May 2024	
India Expansion	Additional India map	1.4.0	27 June 2024	
Legendary Asia Expansion	Additional Legendary Asia map	1.5.0	3 September 2024	
San Francisco Expansion	Additional San Franscico map	1.6.0	31 October 2024	
Switzerland Expansion	Additional Switzerland map	1.7.0	10 December 2024	
Japan Expansion	Additional Japan map	1.8.0	10 April 2025	
Heart of Africa Expansion	Additional Africa map	1.9.0	20 August 2025	
Germany Expansion	Additional Germany map	1.10.0	12 December 2025	

==== Reception ====
The iPhone version received some negative initial reviews due to the lack of functionality, but overall positive reviews as the game was developed. Jim Squires (Gamezebo), while giving the IPhone version a 3.5 out of 10 and noting problems with its scaled-down nature compared to the IPad version, such as the absence of expansions, wrote "Despite all of its shortcomings when compared to the iPad build, Ticket to Ride Pocket is still an excellent portable adaptation of one of the best board games of the last 10 years." Ticket to Ride Pocket won the following awards:

Accolades
Award	Date held	Category	Result	Ref.
Gamzebo	2011	Best Board and Card Games	Won	
Pocket Gamer – Pocket Gamer Awards	2012	Best Strategy / Simulation Game	Won	
Pocket Gamer – Pocket Gamer Awards	2012	IPad Game of the Year	Nominated	
Pocket Gamer – Reader's Choice Awards	2012	iPhone / iPod touch Category	Won	
Pocket Gamer – Reader's Choice Awards	2012	iPad Category	Won	

On VideoGameGeek, the adaptation for the IPhone has an average rating of 7.449, and an "Adjusted Geek" rating of 7.65 from a vote of 465 voting users, being considered the 26th best IPhone game out of the 536 games designed for the IPhone in the survey.

=== Android ===
==== Classic edition ====
On 5 June 2013, the Android version was released. This version ran on Android tablets with a minimum screen size of 1024x600 (recommended: 1280x800), using Android version 4.0.3 or higher. This version was cross-platform compatible with the PC, Mac, and iPad versions. On the year of its release it featured the base original Ticket to Ride USA map, at a cost of $7 (USD), and a variety of expansions and maps that could additionally be purchased:

Downloadable content from Google Play Store
Game title	Content	Release date	Ref.
Ticket to Ride	Core Original (United States) map game	5 June 2013	
USA 1910	Original (United States) map expansions	5 June 2013	
Ticket to Ride - Europe	Additional Europe map	5 June 2013	
Ticket to Ride - Legendary Asia	Additional Legendary Asia map	5 June 2013	
Ticket to Ride: Switzerland	Additional Switzerland map	5 June 2013	
Ticket to Ride: First Journey	Additional First Journey map	27 September 2017	

==== Current edition ====
The "Current Version" was downloadable from Google's Play Store, which featured. It has a general rating for interactivity. The base game was the original United States version, which could be added to by purchasing additional expansions and maps separately or as part of a bundle called the "Round the World Ticket" The purchase price was $7.99 (USD) for the core game with an addition $2.99 (USD) for each additional map bought.

Downloadable content from Google Play Store
Game title	Content	Release date	Ref.
Ticket to Ride	Core Original (United States) map game	12 December 2023	
Europe Expansion	Additional Europe map Europe map expansions: Europa 1912	18 December 2023	
USA 1910 Ticket Pack	Original (United States) map expansion: USA 1910; Big Cities; Mega Game	30 May 2024	
Nordic Expansion	Additional Nordic countries map	20 March 2024	
Legendary Asia Expansion	Additional Legendary Asia map	3 September 2024	
India Expansion	Additional India map	27 June 2024	
San Francisco City Expansion	Additional San Franscico map	31 October 2024	
Ticket to Ride: Switzerland Expansion	Additional Switzerland map	10 December 2024	
Ticket to Ride: Japan Expansion	Additional Japan map	10 December 2024	
Ticket to Ride: Heart of Africa Expansion	Additional Africa map	20 August 2025	
Ticket to Ride: Germany Expansion	Additional Germany map	11 December 2024	

==== Reception ====
Early reviews of the "Classic Edition" were negative, focusing on the early version of the interface's poor quality when compared to the iOS version. Max Eddy (PC Mag), whilst giving the game a 3 out of 5, argued that it was an unexciting premise derailed by poor design, writing "While developer Days of Wonder has succeeded in translating the gameplay of Ticket to Ride, they have fallen short at designing an application that makes sense on Android. This is all the more bewildering because the iOS version of the game is far superior in terms of design." At the end of its first year (27 November 2013), from a collective rating of 859 users on Google play, this adaptation received an average rating of 3.8 out of 5. Later reviews were less harsh. Ric White (One Board Family) wrote "I think this serves as a nice companion to Ticket to Ride, but not a replacement. ... Overall, if you're a fan of the game and would love to be able to play it in environments not conducive to a big board, this will do the trick." Before the sunsetting of the version (8 March 2023), from a collective rating of 20,600 users on Google Play, the rating peaked for this adaptation peaked at 4.7 out of 5.

At the end of its initial year of release (26 December 2023), from a collective rating of 304 review from users on Google Play, it obtained a 4.1 out of 5. and as of 25 September 2024, has maintained that rating, i.e. 4.2 out of 5 ratings from a vote of 1,730 users.

On VideoGameGeek, the adaptation of the game for Android devices holds a rank of 27th out of the 411 Android games surveyed, receiving an average rating of 7.366 and an "Adjusted Geek" rating of 7.65 from a general survey on the game's digital translation of 465 voting users.

=== Windows App ===
A Windows App was launched on 10 December 2019. Subsequently, a version was released on 8 November 2022, which was available on PC or Mobile, requiring an operating system of Windows 10 (version 14393.0) or higher.

== Alexa ==
On 14 November 2019, Days of Wonder announced the introduction of the first official Alexa skills for Ticket to Ride, free to enable from Amazon, that allowed the Amazon Alexa Digital Assistant to play Ticket to Ride and Ticket to Ride: Europe, provided that players had a physical copy of the game. The skill was an Artificial Intelligence (AI) assistant to the physical game, which can teacher the game rules, advise on setting up the game, provided an additional player to the game, keep track of the score, and kept a toll of the amount of train cards and pieces on the board, and even correct any errors in routes attempted.

=== Reception ===
The critical reception was largely favourable. Dale Yu (Opiniated Gamer) wrote "Sure, it's not quite the same as playing a real opponent. You don't get to see the cards that Alexa draws, and you always know which routes that she has (she has to share the physical route card deck to make sure that there are no duplicates); despite that, it's still fun to set up the game and play with your Alexa device."

== Tabletop Simulator ==
As of 28 April 2020, Ticket to Ride was available on Tabletop Simulator, a physics-based virtual gaming simulator. As of 2024, Tabletop Simulator had three versions of Ticket to Ride available: the original United States map, London map, and Japan map.

== Board game arena ==
=== Ticket to Ride (Original) ===
On 28 September 2022, with the addition of the United States map for the original Ticket to Ride version, Ticket to Ride became available on Board Game Arena, a browser-based board game platform with a reported 8 million player strong usage Subsequently, the USA 1910 was implementation on 10 July 2023, by way of a min-expansion for this base game that added three new game modes: 1910, Mega Game, and Big Cities. The game was designed for 2-5 players for a game lasting 11 minutes, and was rated for 2 out of 5 for complexity.

==== Reception ====
In its first year, it became one of the six most popular games, along with Catan, Wingspan, Azul, Carcassonne and Splendor, with one million games having been recorded as having been played. At the beginning of 2024, over 6 million games of the original Ticket to Ride had been played on Board Game Arena., a figure that climbed to over 8 million games mid year, and reaching over 10 million games played at the conclusion of 2024.

=== Ticket to Ride - Europe ===
On 21 December 2023, the Europe map of Ticket to Ride - Europe was launched on Board Game Arena. The game was designed to be played with 2-5 players in a game lasting 12 minutes, and had a complexity rating of 2 out of 5. On 25 June 2024, the Ticket to Ride expansion of Ticket to Ride - Europa 1912 was added.

==== Reception ====
A month after its launch, on 15 January 2024, it was announced that over 100,000 games of Ticket to Ride - Europe had been played on Board Game Arena, a figure which rose to over 700,000 games mid-year, exceeding 1 million games by that year's end.

Games hosted on the Board Game Arena Platform
Game title	Content	Release date	Ref.
Ticket to Ride	Core original (United States 1910) map game, including expansion options: USA 1910; Mega Game; Big Cities	28 September 2022	
Ticket to Ride - Europe	Core Europe map game, including expansion option: Europa 1912	21 December 2023	
Ticket to Ride - Switzerland	Swtizerland map (Stand Alone) / Swtizerland map (Map Collection)	20 December 2024	
Ticket to Ride - Africa	Africa map	26 December 2025	

=== Reception ===
This game received the following honours:

Accolades
Award	Date	Category	Result	Ref.
Board Game Arena Awards	2024	Best Casual Game	Won	

== Overall digital translation ==
The current edition was developed by Marmalade Game Studio, Days of Wonder, Asmodee and Twin Sails Interactive. for platforms for PC, games consol and iPad, replacing the former initial "Classic Editions" in 2024. The current edition is available via 6 major platforms, PlayStation, Xbox (XBox 360 and XBox one), Steam (PC and Mac), Google Play, Apple iOS (IPad, IPhone, and IPod Touch), and Nintendo Switch, a revamped version on the original non-delisted "Classic Edition" by Twin Sails Interactive.

=== Reception ===
The current translation of this Ticket to Ride game franchise into the digital format has received positive reviews. From a combined vote of 465 voting users it has an average rating of 7.65 out of 10 on VideoGameGeek for an across the platform score, and a separate holistic average rating of 7.392 and an "Adjusted Geek" rating of 7.65 for the video game in general. The game achieved received the following awards:

Accolades
Award	Date held	Category	Result	Ref.
Current edition
TechRadar	2024	Best Digital Board Game	Won	
Classic edition
Gold piece – Guldbrikken	2011	Special Digital Jury Prize	Won	

=== Rematch button ===
Along with the launch of the San Francisco map expansion the "Rematch" button was introduced for the first time across all the expansions for the first time, allowing players to save time by remaining in the lobby and start a game with those players who also agreed to a rematch.

=== Characters ===
The current edition features characters indicative of the region of each existing Ticket to Ride map, six characters from the core United States game map two corresponding to each additional map, who exist as AI-generated non-player character opponents for both the offline and online games:

Characters introduced in each map
Character		Profession	Map	Ref.
Title and first name	Surname	Profession	Map	Ref.
Summer	Ashbury	Fashion Designer	San Francisco map	
Ophelia	Bennet	Socialite	Original United States map	
Franziska	Braun	Affluent atelier owner	Germany map	
Lê	Chinh	Travelling artisan	Legendary Asia map	
Lord	Chuffington	Aristocrat	Original United States map	
Amelia	Everest	Adventurer	Original United States map	
Erika	Ford	Business-savy Entrepreneur	Europe map	
Reinhard	Hofmann	World-renowned scholar	Germany map	
Morten	Jensen	Folklore tale collector	Nordic Countries map	
Dr Aanandi	Johri	Doctor	India map	
Elias	Hartmann	Watchmaker	Switzerland map	
Bertie	Hawkes	Travelling salesman	Europe map	
Gyōji Isamu	Moriyama	Tradition and History Guide	Japan map	
Kimiko	Nakanishi	Travel Blogger	Japan map	
Blessing	Kipruto	Griot	Africa map	
Otis	King	Businessman	Original United States map	
Mina	Larsen	Reindeer herder	Nordic Countries map	
Wang	Ling	Opera singer	Legendary Asia map	
Valeria	Lovelace	Adventurer	Original United States map	
Nnamdi	Okpara	Festival organiser	Africa map	
Bhaskar	Singh	Poet	India map	
Ayla	Vogel	Photographer	Switzerland map	
Felix	Woods	Actor	San Francisco map	

=== Locomotives ===
The current edition's core United States game introduced six locomotives, whilst the addition of each map introduced two additional locomotives characteristic of that region:

Locomotives introduced through each map
Locomotive type	Map	Ref.
Artic Express	Nordic Countries map	
Blizzardblaster	Switzerland map	
Dolomite Dynamite	Europe map	
Emporer	Legendary Asia map	
Fahagola	Africa map	
Frosthammer	Nordic Countries map	
Immer Zuverlässige	Germany map	
Iron Horse	Original United States map	
Juggernaut	Original United States map	
Maharaja's Chariot	India map	
Mountain Maiden	Legendary Asia map	
Mountaineer	Original United States map	
Pioneer	Original United States map	
Quicksilver	Original United States map	
Rocket	Europe map	
Royal Orient	Original United States map	
Safari Sights	Africa map	
Schlange	Germany map	
Splendid Smokestack	Switzerland map	
Star Royale	India map	

=== Carriages ===
In the "current edition", the core United States game introduced six carriages, whilst each additional map introduced two additional carriages, each characteristic of that map's region:

Carriages introduced through each map
Carriage type	Map	Ref.
Animal Trails	Africa map	
Boxer	Original United States map	
Barrelbahn	Switzerland map	
Classic	Original United States map	
Gemütlichkeit	Germany map	
Golden Wanderer	Switzerland map	
Hearthside	Nordic Countries map	
Lumberjack	Europe map	
Lotus Wagon	India map	
Maharani's Palace	India map	
Navigator	Original United States map	
Neue Höhen	Germany map	
Oil Baron	Europe map	
Pagoda Pilgrim	Legendary Asia map	
Panorama	Original United States map	
River Runner	Original United States map	
Snowdrifter	Nordic Countries map	
Silk Zephyr	Legendary Asia map	
Stately Travels	Africa map	
Sweet Sleeper	Original United States map	

=== Other vehicles ===
The "current edition" release of the cities' maps introduced six vehicles characteristic of that region:

Verhicles available
Type	Map	Ref.
Municipal Wings	San Francisco map	
Golden Ribbon	San Francisco map	
Hillside Heritage	San Francisco map	
Flower Power	San Francisco map	
Gazelle	San Francisco map	
Cool Cruiser	San Francisco map	
