= Ticket to Ride (board game) =

Board game

- The box cover of the original "Ticket to Ride" version (North America)
- Designers: Alan R. Moon
- Illustrators: Julien Delval; Cyrille Daujean
- Publishers: Days of Wonder (2004)
- Languages: English; Arabic (سكة سفر); Chinese (铁路环游 – simplified/鐵道任務 – traditional); Czech (Jízdenky, Prosím!); Danish (Ticket to Ride); Dutch (Ticket to Ride); Finnish (Menolippu); French (Les Aventuriers du Rail); German (Zug um Zug); Greek (Τρενάκια); Hungarian (Ticket to Ride); Italian (Ticket to Ride); Japanese (チケット・トゥ・ライド / 乗車券); Korean (티켓 투 라이드); Norwegian (Ticket to Ride); Polish (Wsiąść do Pociągu); Portuguese (Ticket to Ride); Spanish (¡Aventureros al Tren!); Swedish (Ticket to Ride); Thai (เกมต่อรถไฟ)
- Players: Varies in each version
- Setup time: <5 minutes
- Playing time: 10–15 minutes ("City Collections"); 30–60 minutes (general); 15–30 minutes ("First Journey" versions); 20–90 minutes ("Legends of the West"); 90–120 minutes (Rails and Sails version)
- Chance: Moderate
- Age range: 6+ ("First Journey" versions); 8+ (general); 10+ (Rails and Sails and Legends of the West versions)
- Skills: Strategy

Ticket to Ride is a series of turn-based strategy railway-themed Eurogames designed by Alan R. Moon, the first of which was released in 2004 by Days of Wonder. This game is the world's highest-selling train game. As of 2026, over 20 million copies of the game have been sold worldwide, and it has been translated into 33 languages. Days of Wonder has released digital versions of the board games, card games, puzzles, and a foreshadowed on-screen adaptation.

== Concept ==
=== Inception ===
The game was created by Alan R. Moon. The inspiration for the game was ocean waves, which Moon had viewed on a walk while reflecting on an unsuccessful session of a complex war game.

=== Gateway game ===
The introductory nature of Ticket to Ride has been noted. Alan R. Moon wrote, "the rules are simple enough to write on a train ticket – each turn you either draw more cards, claim a route or get more destination tickets". Days of Wonder wrote in its promotion that Ticket to Ride's elegantly simple game play can be learned in less than five minutes." Giving the game a 4.7 out of 5, "Board Game Review" wrote, "those in the board game community call games like these 'Entry Level'. Ticket To Ride epitomises this term and is one of the best entry level games." In 2006, Eric Hautemont (Days of Wonder CEO) wrote, "Ticket to Ride has universal appeal ... Moon's simple, yet elegant design delivers a great gaming experience, whether you're a first-time player or a dedicated gamer. It's the perfect gateway into the new world of boardgaming."

Board Game Quest wrote that it is "one of the greatest gateway games ever made", Chris Heindenriecht (Gameology), when listing notable gateway games, "those games striking a balance between simplicity and depth, making them perfect for beginners and seasoned gamers alike", argued that "Ticket to Ride is a classic gateway game that combines strategy, route-building, and a touch of luck". With respect to the game's ability to get new players into board gaming, Ticket to Ride scored second in a 2019 Meeple Mountain survey of over 800 people, in the critical ability of bringing new people into the market and by capturing more spending of existing gamers.

== Reception ==
=== Impact ===
Ticket to Ride has been regarded as a landmark title of the "board game renaissance", an early 2000s shift away from the 20th-century domination by well-established standby games like Monopoly and Life.

Influenced in part by the game's popularity, the game's box dimensions (30 cm × 30 cm × 8 cm) became a popular standard for medium-size games, and are commonly referred to as "standard TtR size".

=== Sales ===
Ticket to Ride was first published in the United States by an American company, Days of Wonder. The very first sale of the game to a German distributor was 600 units, shipped on 27 February 2004, with French and English sales coming soon after. On 12 November 2004, nine months after its release, 250,000 copies of the Ticket to Ride board game had been sold. As of 2026, over 20 million copies of the game have been sold worldwide. The estimates of the total number of the board games sold since the game's release show a consistent increase:

| Year | Cumulative copies sold | Ref. |
|---|---|---|
| 2004 | 250,000 | |
| 2005 | 300,000 | |
| 2006 | 500,000 | |
| 2007 | 750,000 | |
| 2010 | 750,000 | |
| 2011 | 1,500,000 | |
| 2012 | 2,000,000 | |
| 2013 | 3,000,000 | |
| 2014 | 3,000,000 | |
| 2015 | 3,000,000 | |
| 2018 | 6,000,000 | |
| 2019 | 6,000,000 | |
| 2021 | 10,000,000 | |
| 2022 | 10,000,000 | |
| 2023 | 15,000,000 | |
| 2024 | 18,000,000 | |
| 2026 | 20,000,000 | |

=== Critical reception ===
The reception to the Ticket to Ride series, as a whole, had been generally positive. Giving the series an 8.6 out of 10, Board Game Halv wrote "Ticket to Ride is one of the most popular games in the world, period. They have painstakingly earned that distinction over several years and several iterations of the game so it is all well deserved."

== Gameplay ==
The gameplay is based on the format of the original 2004 game's rules (United States 1910), with a few unique rule variations for each version:

=== Set-up ===
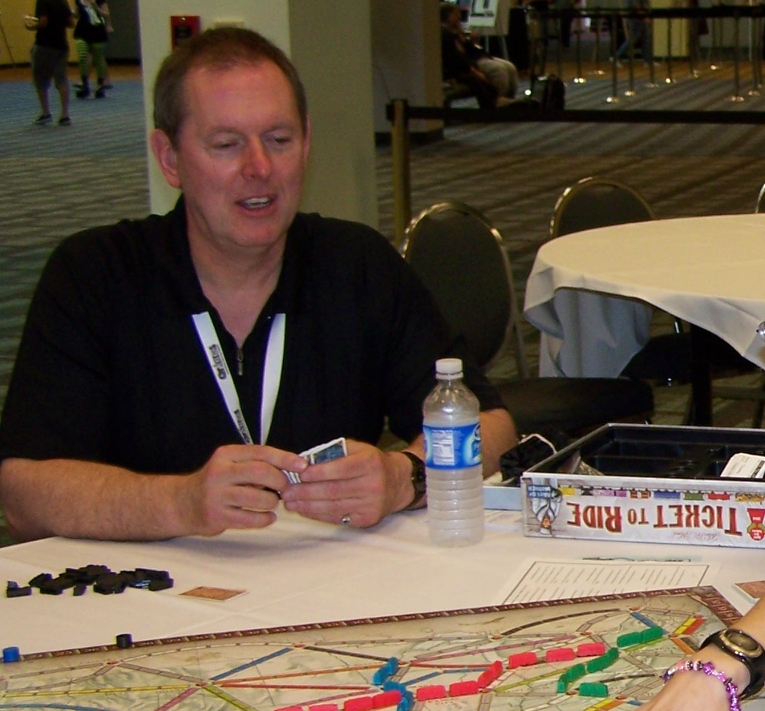
The creator of Ticket to Ride, Alan R. Moon, playing the original version of the game at Origins 2007

At the beginning of each version of the game:

- Each player selects a prescribed number of coloured train pieces specified for that version, with a matching scoring marker.
- Players are usually dealt 4 train car cards. The exceptions are the cities' versions (2 train cards); France (8 train cards); Rails and Sails (3 cards, with 7 ship cards); Great Lakes (2 cards with 2 ship cards); United Kingdom (an additional wild card); and Africa (an additional terrain card).
- Players are also dealt a prescribed number of destination ticket cards which show a route between specified destination cities, the numbers of which are specified in that version's rules. Each player must keep a prescribed number of those assigned ticket cards, but can discard any other unwanted tickets. Retained destination tickets may not be discarded for the rest of the game.

=== Play ===
Each turn, the player chooses from one of three options:

- Draw two railway car cards in various colours from the face-up 5 draw cards or the pack. The Rails and Sails and Great Lakes versions use two draw card piles of 3 train cards and 3 ship cards instead, with the restriction that drawing a face-up wild Locomotive card forfeits drawing another card for that turn (this restriction does not exist in the Switzerland map or the Nordic Countries version). Any removed face-up draw cards are automatically replaced, with all the face-up draw cards being immediately completely replaced if three or more wild locomotive cards are face-up; or
- Draw a number of additional destination ticket cards, specified by the version being played, keeping a specified minimum number in that version; or
- Play their collected railway car cards from their hand to claim a route on the board and place the corresponding number of train pieces from their store on the claimed route. The routes are of varied lengths, and only one player can claim each discrete route marked on the board. Some cities are connected by two parallel routes that can be claimed by two different players (unless the game is played with a number of players lower than a stated threshold of players, in which case only one of the routes can be claimed). A single player may not claim both parallel routes between two cities. On their turn, a player can claim any route on the board that has not already been claimed, regardless of whether the route helps to complete their destination tickets.

The game ends when one player possesses a number of their remaining coloured train pieces which falls below three trains (except for the Rails and Sails version, which is ended when the combined number of any player's own trains/ships falls below 7). Every player then takes one additional turn (two turns in the Rails and Sails version) and then reveals their previously hidden retained ticket cards.

=== Scoring ===
Standard Route Scores
| Route Length (Trains) | Score (Points) |
|---|---|
| 1 | 1 |
| 2 | 2 |
| 3 | 4 |
| 4 | 7 |
| 5 | 10 |
| 6 | 15 |
| 7 | 18 |
| 8 | 21 |
| 9 | 27 |
| 10 | 40 |

Players can earn points by:

- Routes – The points awarded for a route are based on the number of wagons required for that route, using a standard point value for every version.
- Tickets – The combined prescribed points on the ticket cards whose objectives have been completed, i.e. by connecting specified cities in one of their ticket cards (occasionally in a specific order), once the combined prescribed points of any ticket cards with uncompleted objectives have been subtracted.
- Longest Road – A 10 point bonus for the player, or each player for those tied in length, who has built the longest continuous route. In some versions, there is a "globetrotter" instead, i.e. a road from one end of the board to the other, with each player potentially obtaining the points if they build it. Some versions do not have this bonus.
- Most Completed Tickets – A point bonus for the player, or each player for those that tied in number, who completed the most tickets (10 or 15 points depending on the version). Some versions do not have this bonus.

Some versions have additional special rules.

== Stand-alone versions ==
Multiple editions have been published depicting maps of various countries, cities, and regions, many of which have been positively received by critics.

=== Accessories ===
Train Cards

The transport cards are based on various models of train carriages:

Transportation Cards
| Card colour | Model of train carriage |
|---|---|
| Black | Hopper car |
| White | Reefer |
| Red | Coal car |
| Green | Caboose |
| Blue | Passenger car |
| Yellow | Boxcar |
| Purple | Freight car |
| Orange | Tanker |
| Multicoloured Wild | Steam locomotive |

Train Pieces

Each stand-alone game has its own sets of standard plastic train pieces, in the following colours:

Train Playing Piece Colours
| Version | Colours | | | | | | | Ref. |
| Version | Red | Yellow | Black | Green | Blue | Purple | White | Ref. |
|---|---|---|---|---|---|---|---|---|
| Original (1910 United States) | check | check | check | check | check | – | – | |
| Europe | check | check | check | check | check | – | – | |
| Märklin | check | check | check | – | – | check | check | |
| Nordic Countries | – | – | check | – | – | check | check | |
| Germany | check | check | check | – | – | check | check | |
| Rails and Sails ^{†} | check | check | check | check | check | – | – | |
| Northern Lights | check | check | check | – | – | check | check | |

† Rails and Sails contained train and ship playing pieces of a smaller size to the standard train playing pieces.

Pink Train Pieces – On 27 September 2021, Days of Wonder announced the launch of set of pink-colored playing pieces, a colour-themed campaign long associated with breast cancer treatment and research. The initial limited release of these pink playing pieces was during 8 October 2021 – 29 October 2021. These playing pieces were produced as part of a premier partnership between Asmodee and Humble Bundle with the Breast Cancer Research Foundation (BCRF), the first type of such partnership in the board game industry. The playing pieces were first released worldwide in October 2021, as a limited release of 80,000, with €2 from each purchase being donated to the Breast Cancer Research Foundation. On 14 December 2021, Asmodee and Days of Wonder, announced over 40,000 physical unit were sold in 18 countries (France, Italy, Belgium, and Poland selling out of stock in the first 10 days) and over 67,000 digital units were sold, raising over $184,000 (USD). Since then, these playing pieces have been released in October each year.

Version-Specific Pieces

Some versions had unique playing pieces specific to that version's rules, e.g. stations, depots, passengers, meeples, harbours, city markers, bullet trains etc.

Piece-Based Expansions

Dice Expansion — On 15 January 2008, Days of Wonder foreshadowed the release of a mini-expansion, based on replacing the collection and use of train cards with rolls of either 5 custom train dice or 3 tunnel dice, which could be used on any board map from the Ticket to Ride series. This expansion debuted at Spiel '08 (23 – 26 October 2008) in Essen (Germany) before its general release in October 2008. As of 1 August 2026, on BoardGameGeek, this mini-expansion has a "complexity rating" of 1.52 out of 5. The response to this mini-expansion was lukewarm. On Board Gaming, the expansion only received a 5.2 out of 10 from 37 votes with a comment "Since you'll be able to claim routes almost every turn, the game goes quite a bit faster. You also won’t be holding cards in your hand, which some players like, and others don't. The downside is that you lose the anticipation the cards bring." Shannon Appelcline (RPG), awarding it a 4 out of 5 for 'style' and a 3 out of 5 for 'substance', wrote "Ticket to Ride: The Dice Expansion isn't for everyone, but if you're looking for lighter and more casual play, particularly for games with children, then it's a fun and clever supplement to Ticket to Ride." As of 26 April 2025, it currently has an 'Adjusted Geek' rating of 5.540, and an average rating of 5.69, out of a vote of 860 members.

Alvin and Dexter Expansion — On 4 January 2011, Days of Wonder foreshadowed the release of a mini-expansion based on two finely detailed monster figurines, "Alvin, the alien" and "Dexter, the Dino", that were advertised as being compatible with any of the Ticket to Ride games. The pieces, placed initially on the board by the two players who started last, could be moved three cities away during play for each of the maximum of two wild cards spent during a player's turn, except onto those cities with a station, depot, or passenger, with the effect of the piece blocking routes being built into the city on which they were placed and making any destination ticket to the city it remained on at the end of the game worth half its points. Players received corresponding monster cards for each movement, with the players with the highest number of monster cards for a given monster at the end of the game receiving some bonus points. Moon wrote that the pieces were designed to "introduce a devious new tactical layer to the game that forces players to think about how to best use them and when to defend against them". This mini-expansion was released in February 2011 and currently has a complexity rating of 1.56 out of 5 on BoardGameGeek. Critics viewed this mini-expansion favourably. Shannon Appelcline (RPG.net), whilst giving it a 5 out of 5 for 'style' and a 4 out of 5 for 'substance', wrote "The monstrous Alvin & Dexter supplement really changes up the Ticket to Ride game and is well worth picking up if you enjoy any of the Ticket to Ride games". James Engelhardt (Gaming Gang), whilst noting the problematic top-heavy nature of the figurines, wrote "Great sculpts, light rules that add strategic depth - Alvin & Dexter is rock solid. Pick it up when you can." As of 26 April 2025, this mini-expansion currently has an average rating of 6.51 and an adjusted "Geek Rating" of 5.928, from the response of 1,756 voting members. The concept of "Alvin, the alien" subsequently became a feature of the Old West version in the Volume 6: France + Old West installment of the map collection series.

=== 1) Ticket to Ride (Original) ===
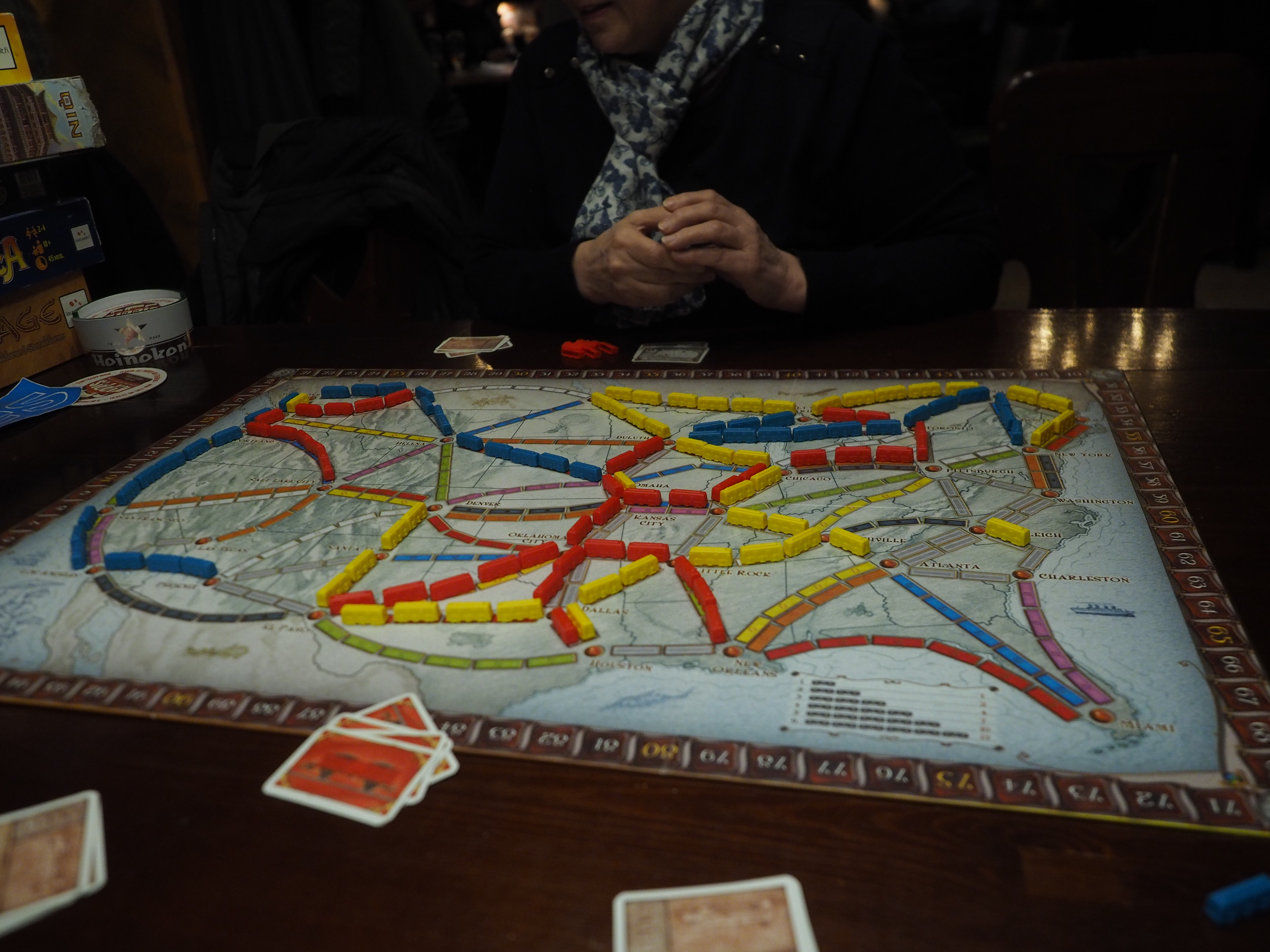
The original version of the Ticket to Ride board featuring the United States and southern Canada

The original version was based on a 1910 map of the United States and southern Canada. It was released in late February 2004 in Europe and in late March 2004 in Korea and North America.

The train and mission cards were in a smaller size compared to subsequent versions in the Ticket to Ride franchise. This game currently has a complexity rating of 1.83 out of 5 on BoardGameGeek. The recommendation is that it is played with 2–5 players, who are aged 8 or older, for a game lasting between 30 and 60 minutes.

Reception – Reviews from the critics were overwhelmingly positive. Mike Fitzgerald called Ticket to Ride "a game that I never tire of, one that lends itself well to the many expansions that Days of Wonder have released. The design principles it uses are all simple and have been done before, but they have never been put together in a game as compelling as Ticket to Ride." Board Gaming, when giving the game a 7.8 out of 10, wrote "A game almost everyone loves to play. It's easy to learn and quick to play, which makes it ideal for introducing you, your friends and your family to board games." As of 14 December 2025 this original version has an average rating of 7.39, and an adjusted "Geek Rating" of 7.263, on BoardGameGeek, based on the responses from 96,416 voting members.

The original version won the following awards:

Accolades
| Award | Date | Category | Result | Ref. |
|---|---|---|---|---|
| Game of the Year (Germany) – Spiel des Jahres | 2004 | Game of the Year | Won | |
| Origins Award | 2004 | Best Board Game | Won | |
| Japan Boardgame Prize | 2004 | Best Advanced Game | Won | |
| Games on a Board – Jeux sur un plateau | 2004 | Gold Award | Won | |
| Bruno Faidutti (Personal) | 2004 | Game of the Year | Won | |
| Parents' Choice Award | 2004 | Silver Honour | Won | |
| Meeples' Choice Award | 2004 | Meeples' Choice | Won | |
| Swiss Games Prize – Schweizer Spielepreis | 2004 | Family Games | 2nd place | |
| German Games Prize – Deutscher Spiele Preis | 2004 | Game of the Year | 6th place | |
| Golden Trictrac – Tric Trac d'or | 2004 | Game of the Year | Nominated | |
| Dutch Games Prize – Nederlandse Spellenprijs | 2004 | Game of the Year | Nominated | |
| International Gamers Awards | 2004 | Best Multi-player Strategy Game | Nominated | |
| Games Magazine – Games 100 | 2005 | "Family Games" Category | Top 100 | |
| Diana Jones Award | 2005 | Excellence in Gaming | Won | |
| Game of the Year (France) – Golden Ace (As d'Or) | 2005 | Game of the year | Won | |
| Game of the Year (Sweden) – Årets spel | 2005 | Family Game of the Year | Won | |
| Game of the Year (Norway) – Årets Spill | 2005 | Family Game of the Year | Nominated | |
| Game of the Year (Spain) – Juego del Año | 2005 | Game of the Year | Won | |
| Game of the Year (Finland) – Vuoden peli | 2005 | Family Game of the Year | Won | |
| Game of the year (Czech Republic) – Hra roku | 2006 | Game of the Year | Won | |
| Japanese Boardgame Prize | 2006 | Best Japanese Game | Won | |
| Ideal playroom (Italy) – Ludoteca Ideale | 2008 | Official Selection | Top 10 | |
| Hungarian Board Game Award | 2010 | Game of the Year | Nominated & Top 4 | |

The following card expansions were produced to complement the original Ticket to Ride version:

a) Mystery Train – Days of Wonder premiered the German version of a card expansion called Ticket to Ride: Mystery Train at Spiel '04 (21 – 24 October 2004) in Essen (Germany). This expansion was given away free along with the newly released original (North America) core game as part of a limited release of 30,000 decks, exclusively distributed at the convention and not to be sold elsewhere. After that, the English version was available in the United States through the December '04 Game Trade Magazine, and then generally in stores. This expansion was a series of cards, in the original smaller card format, which included:
- Mission Tickets – Four new short destination tickets;
- Character Cards – Five unique character cards, including three cards ("Station Master", "Conductor", "Industrial Magnate") that allowed a player to get bonus points at the end of the game for accomplished tasks; and two copies of a card ("Engineer") that allowed a player to immediately look through the entire deck of tickets and take one.

The cards had a distinctive backing to provide incentive for players to draw more cards at the risk of getting additional destination cards. This expansion has a "complexity rating" of 1.81 out of 5 on boardgamegeek.

Reception – Reviews were mixed, with positive praise considering the nature of this free mini-expansion. While giving the expansion a 5 out of 5 for style and a 4 out of 5 for substance, Shannon Appelcline (RPG) wrote "Mystery Train is a nice little expansion to Ticket to Ride; its not earth-shattering (or essential), but its worth going to the trouble to pick up, as it'll cause some slight changes in your Ticket to Ride games." In later reviews, the incompatibility with the newer, now standard, large card size, used in the USA 1910 expansion and the stand-alone versions was noted. Giving the expansion a 5 out of 10, Spiel Fritte wrote "Mystery Train is only available in small card format. If you want to play with the larger and more manageable cards, you can forget about this expansion. What a shame." On BoardGameGeek, As of 20 August 2026, this expansion has an average rating of 6.64 and an adjusted "Geek Rating" of 5.820, from a combined vote of 949 voting users.

b) USA 1910 – USA 1910 had its premier release in conjunction with Spiel '06 (19 – 22 October 2006) in Essen, Germany. The initial release was packaged in a distinctive, 2-piece metal box. The release was limited, with some countries like the United States only having 10,000 copies made available. The expansion, which became a standard supplement to the original game, contained:

- Large format reprints of the original card deck, replacing the much smaller ones included in the original game;
- Thirty-five new destination tickets, including four from the out-of-print Mystery Train expansion;
- A "Globetrotter" bonus card.

The expansion also included a rulebook giving three additional different ways to play the game:

- 1910 Rules - A range of new missions;
- Big Cities Rules - Only missions between major metropolises;
- Mega Game - Featuring all the possible missions.

This card expansion currently has a complexity rating of 1.89 out of 5 on BoardGameGeek.

Reception – The game received favourable reviews to the 1910 expansion, especially as an indispensable add-on to the original. Nathan Coobs, while giving it 83%, wrote "True to their word, Days of Wonder have used the 1910 expansion to re-inject some life and vigour into this old showpiece. ... For us 1910 is a mandatory part of the game." Tom Vasel (RPG), while giving it a 4 out of 5 for both style and substance, wrote "Large cards and a whopping thirty-five new tickets are a good enough reason to picking up this inexpensive expansion. It turns the original Ticket to Ride into a more tactical game, almost putting it on par with the strategy king of the series – Ticket to Ride: Märklin." In contrast, some reviewers questioned the need for the expansion. Vincent (Dad's Gaming Addiction), while giving it 7 out of 10, wrote "The base game is perfectly playable by itself and can easily provide entertainment for years to come…most casual gamers can and will be happy with just that. With that said, sometimes you just want more. I personally would have liked another train set so that six players could play or something along those lines, but I suppose USA 1910 does the job as-is even if it is a tad on the expensive side." On BoardGameGeek, As of 21 August 2026, the USA 1910 card expansion received an average rating of 8.00 and an adjusted "Geek rating" of 7.566, from a vote amongst 11,108 voting users.

=== 2) Ticket to Ride: Europe ===
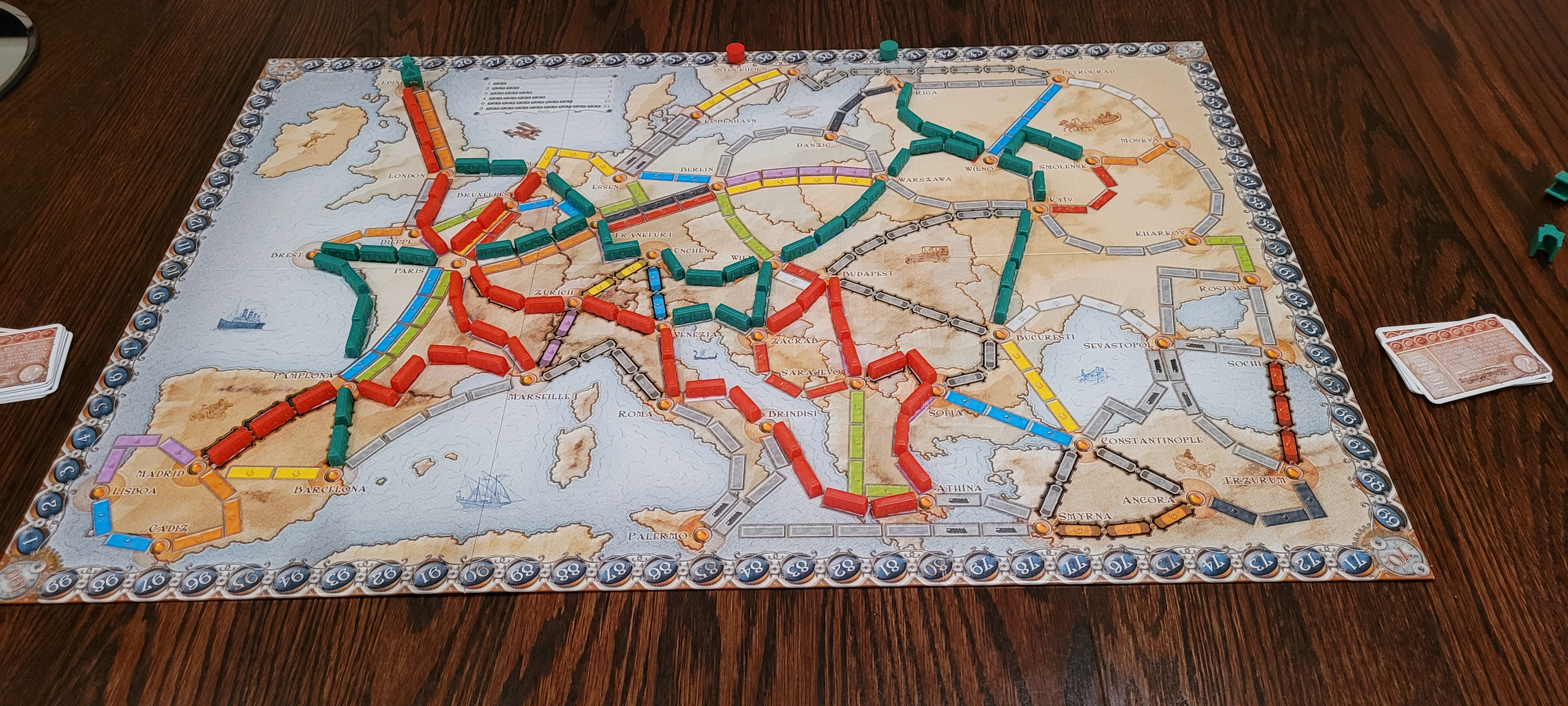
A game of Ticket to Ride: Europe at the end of a two-player game

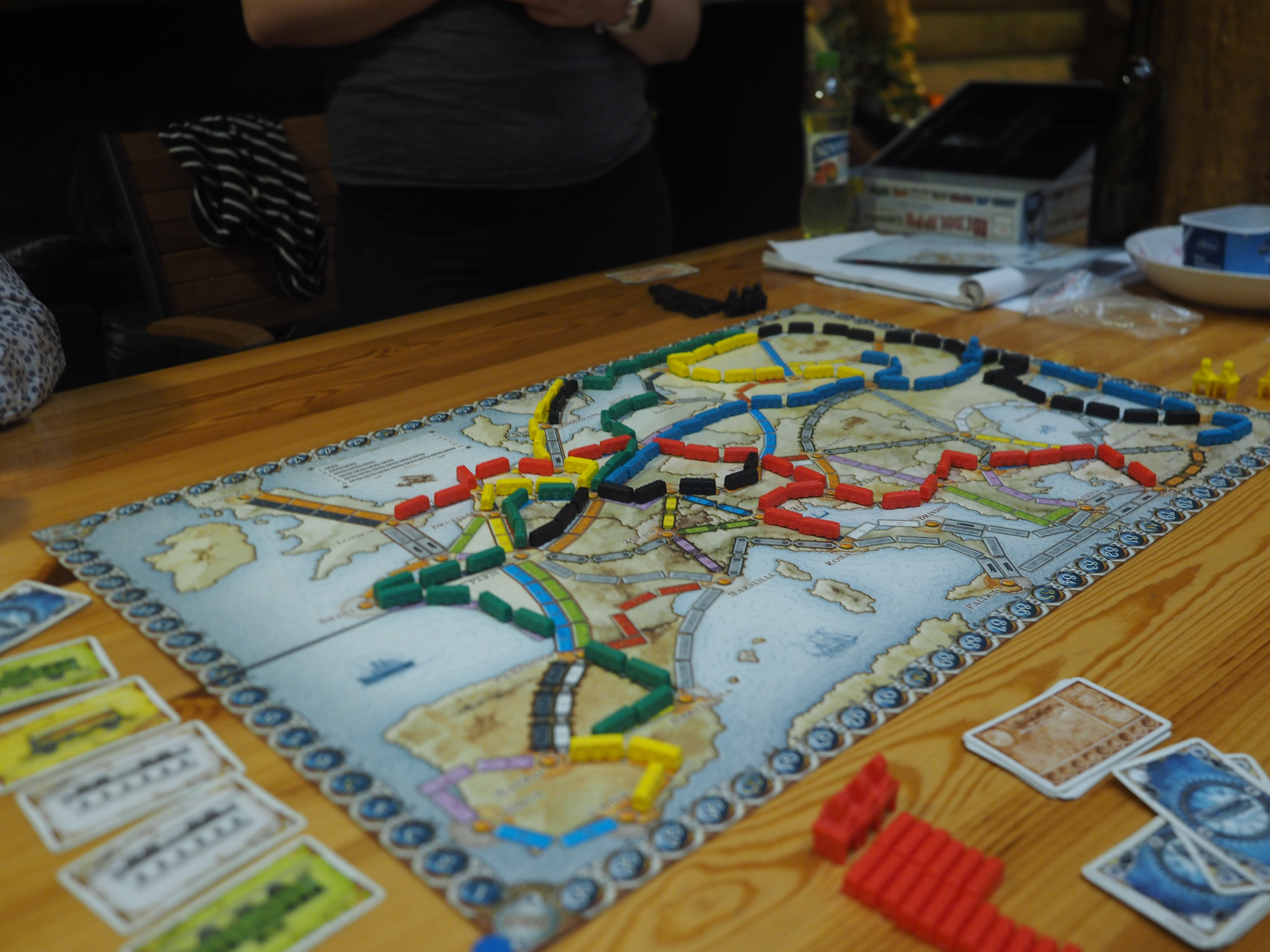
A five-player game of Ticket to Ride – Europe at a special board game camp in Hattula (Finland)

A Europe version was released in mid-2005, as the second installment in the Ticket to Ride series, based on a 1912 map of Europe. Compared to the original version, as it was then its only sequel, it was referred to as the "gamer's version" of Ticket to Ride.

The two main map elements, which differed from the original, were the "ferry routes", that required locomotive cards to be played when claiming them; and "tunnel routes", which added the risk that additional train cards may be necessary to complete the route. Another additional element of the game was the use of "stations" which allowed the player to use a route owned by another player to complete their destination tickets. The recommendation was that it be played by 2–5 players, who are aged 8-years-old or older, for a game lasting 30–60 minutes. This version currently has a "complexity rating" of 1.92 out of 5 on BoardGameGeek.

Reception – The reviews from critics were largely positive. Board Games Land wrote "With Ticket to Ride: Europe, everyone in the family will enjoy the mix of tension and satisfaction by building train networks and completing objectives. It has a challenging map and newly introduced 'stations' and 'tunnels', adding a very welcome twist. I am yet to find a family that would not have enjoyed the family board game experience the game delivers. In addition, it is one of the most popular family board games ever made!" Critical review centered on this version's legitimacy in comparison with the original version. Tyler Nichols (Board Game Quest), while giving it 5 out of 5, wrote "Ticket to Ride: Europe takes the original game and, in my opinion, makes it better than any of the other editions. The core game play of Ticket to Ride is very intuitive and accessible to new players, but still has some strategic elements to keep hardcore board gamers engaged. Ticket to Ride: Europe is one of the greatest gateway games ever made and should find a place on your gaming shelf." Ken B. (There will be Games), while giving this version a 4 out of 5 wrote "If you think that your audience can handle the few extra rules, go for Europe. If you think the basic game or presence of the US map is going to make a difference, definitely go with that. Either way, I don't think you can go wrong." On BoardGameGeek, the game currently has an average rating of 7.53, and an adjusted "Geek Rating" of 7.405, from a response of 76,305 voting users.

The Ticket to Ride: Europe version won the following awards:

Accolades
| Award | Date | Category | Result | Ref. |
|---|---|---|---|---|
| International Gamers Awards | 2005 | General Strategy – Multiplayer | Won | |
| Japanese Boardgame Prize | 2005 | Best Advanced Game | 2nd place | |
| Game of the Year (Norway) – Årets Spill | 2006 | Best Family Game | Won | |
| Games Magazine – Games 100 | 2006 | "Family Strategy Game" Category | Top 100 | |
| Games of the Year (Russia) | 2007 | Best Family Game | Won | |
| Games of the Year (Russia) | 2007 | Best Family Game | Won | |
| Hungarian Board Game Award | 2013 | Special Prize | Won | |

The following card expansions were released to complement Ticket to Ride: Europe:

a) Europa 1912 – On 6 August 2009, Days of Wonder announced the October 2009 global release of a card expansion, entitled Europe 1912. This card expansion contained additional destination tickets and an additional play mechanism involving "warehouses" and "depots". On BoardGameGeek this expansion received a "complexity rating" of 1.93 out of 5.
Reception – The expansion received positive reviews, with specific mention of its perceived indispensability with the base game. Antonios S (RPG) wrote "Ticket To Ride: Europa 1912 is the kind of expansion that adds to a game's tactical experience without making the learning curve any harder. It is straightforward, it is tense, it is inexpensive. I can't see myself playing Ticket to Ride Europe without it in the future." Nikhil Vyas (Scot Scoop) wrote "Overall, Ticket to Ride Europe 1912 is an excellent expansion for Ticket to Ride Europe. The new tickets are a necessary addition to the game, and the warehouses and depots are fun to bring out once in a while. My only issue with this expansion is that the rulebook focused so much on supporting many languages that it didn't do a good job teaching the rules in any of them." On BoardGameGeek, Europa 1912 received an average rating of 7.63, and an adjusted "Geek Rating" of 7.019, from the combined votes of 5,736 voting users.
b) Orient Express – This card expansion, called Ticket to Ride: Europe – Orient Express, premiered at Spiel '15 (8 – 11 October 2015) in Essen, Germany, where it was given free from the Days of Wonder booth with a purchase of either Ticket to Ride: United Kingdom or Zug um Zug 1902, and was subsequently available for purchase via the Days of Wonder website.
This expansion contained seven destination tickets based on the route of the Orient Express. Currently, on BoardGameGeek, this card expansion has a "complexity rating" of 1.5 out of 5.
Reception – On BoardGameGeek, the Orient Express mini-expansion has an average rating of 7.10, and an adjusted "Geek Rating" of 5.674, as a result of votes from 259 voting users.

=== 3) Ticket to Ride: Märklin ===
On 26 April 2006 a version was released entitled Ticket to Ride: Märklin by Märklin, a German toy company best known for model railways and technical toys, based on a map of 1902 Germany.

The unique differences in game play included a unique +4 locomotive card, which could be picked up without the normal wild card restrictions but could only be used on routes requiring more than four trains; and a passenger mechanism, where "passengers" could be placed on the board and used to claim "merchandise tokens" by traveling along a player's own route in a subsequent turn, or another player's route using "passenger cards". Whereas transport cards of other versions were identical for each colour, each individual transport card in this version displayed a different train carriage from Märklin's rolling stock. The game was designed for 2–5 players, aged 8-years-old or older, for a game lasting 30–60 minutes. On BoardGameGeek, this version has a "complexity rating" of 2.24 out of 5.

Reception – Shannon Appelcline (RPG), while giving it a 5 out of 5, wrote "As with Ticket to Ride Europe this one feels more strategic and better balanced than the original. Because of the new orthogonal decisions required by the 'merchandise tokens', I definitely wouldn't suggest this to casual gamers as a first Ticket to Ride game, but more serious gamers who want a bit more grist in their play will definitely enjoy it." Tom Vasel (Dice Tower) wrote "I encourage anyone who shied away from the original game ('because it was simple and boring') to give this version a try; it's not simply an expansion but a completely new game. ... It's a fantastic game and is one of the most balanced systems I've ever played. Alan Moon has proved that Ticket to Ride is not a tired franchise, but rather a series of exciting, interesting games." Upon it going out of print, Eric Mortinson (Geek Hobbies) wrote "Ticket to Ride Märklin is a fantastic game but I don’t think it is going to be for everyone. ... When you factor in that the game is somewhat rare and thus pretty expensive, I don’t know if Ticket to Ride Märklin is worth its’ [sic] current price." On BoardGameGeek, the game has achieved an average rating of 7.41, and an "Adjusted Geek" rating of 7.027, based on responses from 9,196 voting users.

The Ticket to Ride: Märklin version won the following awards:

Accolades
| Award | Date | Category | Result | Ref |
|---|---|---|---|---|
| Games Magazine – Games 100 | 2007 | "Family Game" Category | Top 100 | |

=== 4) Ticket to Ride: Switzerland ===
After previously being available on the Ticket to Ride computer game for the PC in 2006, a Ticket to Ride game, based on a map of Switzerland and entitled Ticket to Ride: Switzerland, was released as a single-map version in October 2007, as the fourth 'big box' Ticket to Ride release after the Europe and Märklin versions. It was later re-released in the map expansion entitled Volume 2: India + Switzerland in 2011.

Switzerland had bonuses for joining two of the countries neighbouring Switzerland together. This version was designed for a 2–3 players, 8-years-old or older, for a game lasting 30–45 minutes. The Swiss map was quoted as Moon's favorite Ticket to Ride, until it was replaced 17 years later by the 2024 Iberian map. It has a BoardGameGeek "complexity rating" of 1.95 out of 5.

Reception – The Switzerland map received favourable reviews, upon its 2007 release. Herb Levy (Gamers Alliance) wrote "The Ticket to Ride series has been successful for very good reasons. It is attractive in presentation, easy to learn and has enough depth to warrant repeated and satisfying plays. Ticket to Ride: Switzerland adds a certain freshness to the game that will keep its fans riding those rails while enjoying some new scenery." On I Slay the Dragon the expansion received a 9 out of 10, with the reviewer writing "Ticket to Ride: Switzerland, while perhaps not the chosen map for casual play, is the ideal choice for competitive two-player games. The game is short, tense, and exhilarating. I like the new rules for the map, and even though swings in luck can be frustrating, they usually affect both players and are just factors necessary to consider when choosing a strategy." This version currently has an average rating of 7.50, and an adjusted "Geek Rating" of 6.870, based on the responses from 4,872 voting users.

=== 5) Ticket to Ride: Nordic countries ===
This version was based on a vertically formatted board map focused on Scandinavia (Denmark, Finland, Norway, and Sweden), with some cities in Estonia and Russia. This version was initially released in only the Swedish, Norwegian, Danish and Finnish languages in 2007. In 2008, the Days of Wonder CEO (Eric Hautemont) wrote "When we released the game in Scandinavia last year, we had no idea that Ticket to Ride players in the rest of the world would be so eager to get their own copy. I'm sure we fostered a lot of international gaming friendships as fans elsewhere tried to find gamers in the Nordic world who would buy and ship them a copy!". On 7 July 2008, Days of Wonder announced this version's launch in other languages, including English, French, and German, as part of a general release in September 2008. Eric Hautemont (Days of Wonder CEO) wrote "The design of Ticket to Ride Nordic Countries, with its winter graphic themes of snowy landscapes, reindeer and even touches of holly, is a perfect match for the coming holiday season." This 2008 general release was foreshadowed to be a limited release, but this version is currently still produced as one of Days of Wonder's regularly sold Ticket to Ride versions.

This version incorporated the ferry routes and tunnel mechanisms similar to the Ticket to Ride – Switzerland version, in that while there was no restriction on picking up exposed wild cards, these wild cards could only be used to build tunnel or ferry routes. The recommendation is that this version is played with only 2–3 players, who are aged 8 or older, for a game lasting between 30 and 60 minutes. This version has a complexity rating of 1.97 on BoardGameGeek.

Reception – This version has largely favourable critical reviews. Shannon Appelcline (RPG) while giving this version a 5 out of 5 for 'Style' and 'Substance', wrote "Ticket to Ride: Nordic Countries is an excellent variant of the Ticket to Ride game system. It's got a fun map that feels quite different from what came before. If you regularly play with 2 or 3 players and like Ticket to Ride, this is an excellent standalone game to try out." Fred Cronin, whilst giving this version an 85%, wrote "Despite being part of such a sizeable board game family, Ticket to Ride: Nordic Countries is a charming game that adds fun twists to the modern classic Ticket to Ride. I would wholeheartedly recommend this to anyone looking for a candidate for small group games nights or even just for play with one other person. ... If you couldn’t get away for your Christmas holidays, don’t worry, Nordic Countries has your back!". BoardGameGeek currently has an average rating of 7.320, and an adjusted "Geek Rating" of 7.63, for this version, from the responses of 14,110 contributors.

=== 6) Ticket to Ride: Germany ===
==== German Version ====
In 2012, Zug um Zug: Deutschland (German: [Zug əm Zug: Deutschland], Ticket to Ride: Germany) was released by Asmodee, at that point Days of Wonder's German distributor, solely in the German language for the German and Austrian market. This version was based on a map of 1902 Germany, with the same route layout as that of Ticket to Ride: Märklin.

This version was designed for 2–5 players, 8-years-old or older, for a game lasting 30–60 minutes. Users of the website Board Game Geek rated this edition's "complexity rating" an average of 1.90 out of 5.

Reception – The response from the critics to Zug um Zug: Deutschland was positive, but not ecstatic. Jörgs Meinung (cliquenabend), while giving this version a 7 out of 10, wrote "As a Ticket to Ride connoisseur, collector and enthusiast, you know what to expect here: A 'light' Märklin version that is still fun." This version of the game has an average rating of 7.53, and an adjusted "Geek Rating" of 6.083, based on the response from 883 voting users.

The following expansion was produced:

- Germany 1902 – In 2015, Asmodee released Zug um Zug: Deutschland – Deutschland 1902, a card expansion for this German map that had additional destination tickets and an additional meeple mechanism, later included in Ticket to Ride: Germany. It has a "complexity rating" of 2.00 out of 5 on BoardGameGeek.

==== English Version ====
On 12 April 2017, Days of Wonder announced its pending release of a version entitled Ticket to Ride: Germany for the English speaking market, based on the same map of 1902 Germany used in both Ticket to Ride: Märklin and Zug um Zug: Deutschland. This version was released in June 2017 in Europe and then subsequently in August 2017 in the United States through its American premiere release at booth #1619 of Gen Con (17–20 August 2017).

This version was a combination of Zug um Zug: Deutschland and Deutschland 1902, likewise including that expansion's meeple mechanism. The game was designed for 2–5 players, aged 8-years-old or older, for a game lasting 30–60 minutes. Adrien Martinot (Days of Wonder general manager) wrote "We decided to release this version, which was limited to German market only, in order to answer the demand of all Ticket to Ride fans worldwide". This version has a "complexity rating" of 2.24 out of 5 on BoardGameGeek.

Reception – The reviews were generally positive. Derek Thompson (Geeks under Grace) wrote "If you don't want to get the original base game or are just looking for a second standalone, I would actually venture to say that this is the best standalone box." Jennifer Derrick (I Slay the Dragon), while giving it an 8.8 out of 10, wrote "Overall, this is a solid addition to the Ticket to Ride line. I'd recommend picking it up if you're a fan who likes to have all the maps, or if you're in the market for your first Ticket to Ride game." but added "It's fun and the passengers/destination tickets add new strategic layers, but it's still Ticket to Ride at its heart. None of these additions change the game so much that you think, "Wow, this is what I've been looking for all of my life."" This version currently has an average rating of 7.59, and an "Adjusted Geek" rating of 6.396, based on the votes of 1,714 voting members.

=== 7) Ticket to Ride: Rails and Sails ===
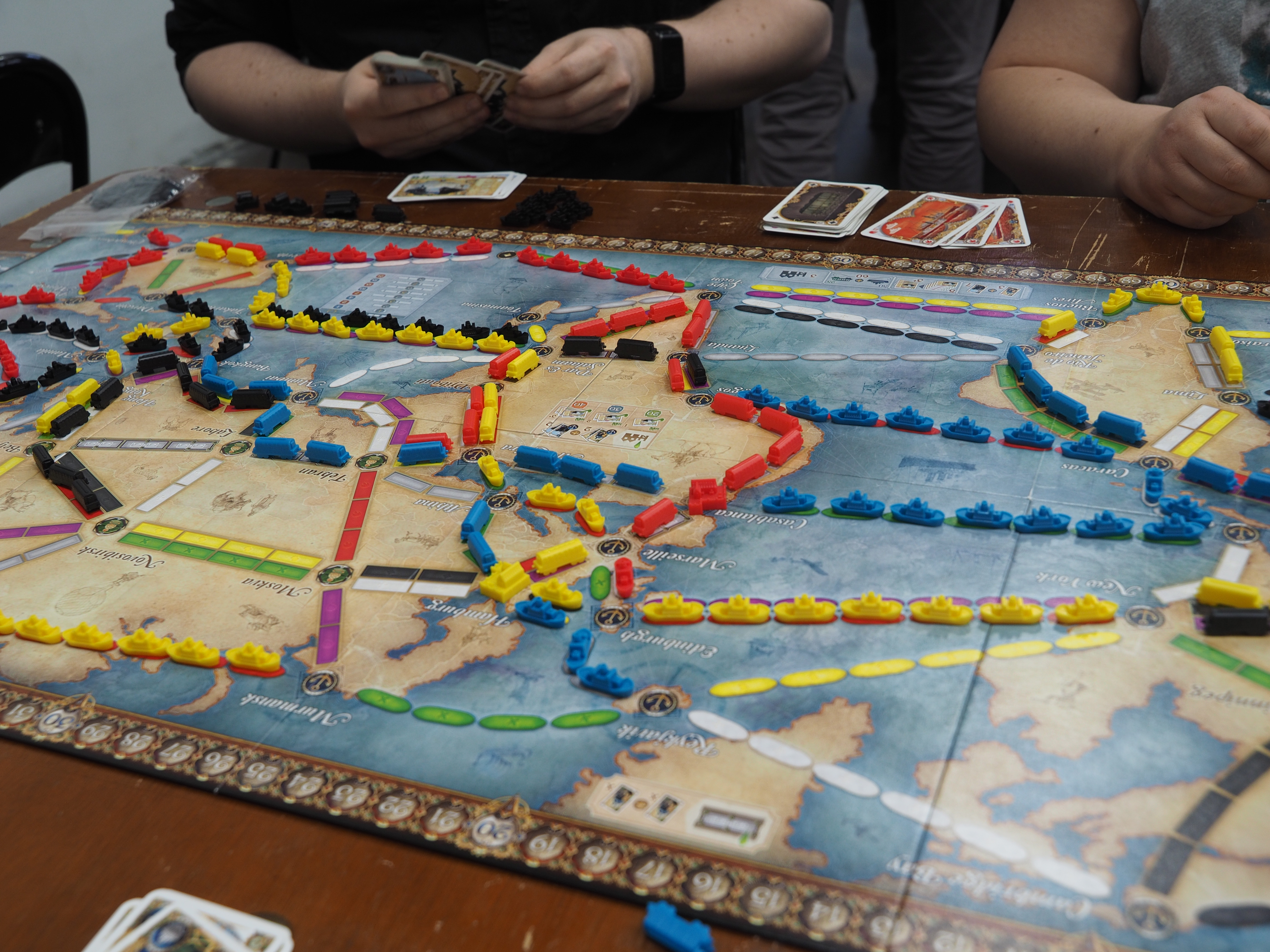
A four-player game of Ticket to Ride: Rails & Sails during play

On 21 June 2016, Days of Wonder announced its pending release of a standalone version called "Ticket to Ride: Rails and Sails", featuring a double-sided board with a world map on one side and a map of the Great Lakes region of North America on the other. The game premiered at that year's Gen Con (Booth #1829; 4–7 August 2016), before subsequently being released globally in early September 2016.

The game's board is the largest used in any Ticket to Ride game. This version contains train pieces and ship pieces, with a corresponding train card deck and ship card deck, to be played on land routes and on water routes respectively, as well as 3 harbour playing pieces for each player. The game was designed for 2–5 players aged 10-years or older for a game lasting 90–120 minutes. Alan R. Moon wrote:-

Since our planet is about 70% water, when I started thinking about doing a world map for Ticket to Ride, it just seemed natural to add ships to the game. As I started laying the routes, it also became obvious that I would need some way to accommodate the longer ship routes. The double ship cards were the simple answer. To balance these powerful cards, I decided to put all the Wild Cards in the train deck.

It was tough to figure out what the optimal mix of ships and trains was in the game. That led to the rules allowing players to choose their own mix of ships and trains at the start. Combining all of these elements created a game that has some fairly diverse strategies and what I hope is a totally refreshing Ticket to Ride experience.

Reception – Opinions among the critics were mixed. Chris Way (Opinionated Gamers) wrote "Rails & Sails continues the tradition, arguably even taking it to the next level by making the game more think-y. Throw in the stunningly-beautiful double-sided map, and this could be a hit." Brian Biewer (Board Game Quest) wrote "I was not impressed with Ticket to Ride: Rails & Sails. I appreciate the attempt at changing up the Ticket to Ride formula, but the increased luck factor combined with the increased game length reduced my enjoyment of the game. I would only recommend Ticket to Ride: Rails & Sails to diehard Ticket to Ride fans who would not mind playing a longer version of Ticket to Ride that adds boats and a new set of cards to draw from."

=== 8) Ticket to Ride: Northern Lights ===
This version had a limited release to only countries in Scandinavia in 2022 (9 November 2022). It was a standalone version based on a map of Scandinavia (Denmark, Finland, Norway and Sweden), similar to the Ticket to Ride: Nordic countries version, but also contained cities in the Baltic nations (Estonia, Latvia, and Lithuania), Poland, and Russia.

Similar to the Ticket to Ride: Nordic countries version, it was recommended to be played with players who are 8-years-old or older for a game lasting for 30–60 minutes, however, it was designed for 2–5 players, in contrast to the 2–3 players recommended for Ticket to Ride – Nordic Countries. Ticket to Ride: Northern Lights has a complexity rating of 2.00 out of 5 on BoardGameGeek. The unique aspect of this game is that four random bonuses are assigned out of 11 possible bonus cards, which awarded points to the player who best fulfilled the chosen bonus card conditions:

List of Bonus Cards
| Card | Requirement | Points |
|---|---|---|
| Locomotive Collector | Most locomotive cards held. | 5 |
| Capital Investment | Most completed tickets to Copenhagen, Oslo, Stockholm or Helsinki. | 7 |
| Cost Effective | Most train pieces left. | 7 |
| Small Step Strategist | Most claimed single-train routes. | 10 |
| Nordic Express | Long continuous series of trains. | 10 |
| Local Area Network | Most completed short destination tickets (≤5 points) | 10 |
| International Tycoon | Most different countries connected. | 12 |
| Polar Express | Most completed tickets with cities in the Arctic Circle. | 12 |
| Snowplough Reward | Most routes connecting cities in the Arctic Circle. | 12 |
| Ferry Master | Most ferry routes. | 12 |
| Wild West | Most routes connecting two Norwegian cities together. | 7 |

Reception – This version had largely positive reviews. "This is another very successful variant that Ticket to Ride enthusiasts will be happy to serve." BoardGameGeek, As of 5 August 2026, gives this version an average rating of 7.83, and an adjusted "Geek Rating" of 5.932, based on the reviews of 590 voters.

=== 9) Ticket to Ride Legacy: Legends of the West ===
See also: Ticket to Ride Legacy: Legends of the West

On 30 May 2023, Days of Wonder and Asmodee announced the release of this version on 3 November 2023. The game was premiered via a demonstration at Gen Con (3–6 August 2023) and received a pre-release at the Days of Wonder booth (Hall 6, D200) at Spiel '23 in Essen (Germany) before being launched as scheduled in selected retailers and the Asmodee official store. This version was designed by Alan R. Moon (Ticket to Ride), Matt Leacock (Pandemic), and Rob Daviau (Pandemic Legacy). The recommendation is that it is played with two-five players, who are aged 10 or older, for a game lasting between 20 and 90 minutes.

This version adapts the original Ticket to Ride concept to the legacy format, i.e. a campaign board game where new content is gradually unlocked, through sealed boxes and envelopes, not only permanently changing the state of the game during play, thus altering the story as it unfolds, but also, permanently transforming the entire game into a unique version, depending on the outcomes of the previous games played. Matt Thrower (IGN), commenting on its legacy structure, wrote "The fashion has moved on to more 'resettable' campaigns, but Ticket to Ride: Legacy sees you making permanent changes, resulting in a version of the game that's unique to you. While it's good to see this back, those changes feel less personal than they did in the earliest legacy games, and some of the mini-games are gone forever once they're over. So it's questionable how often your group might continue playing once the twelve games are up."

This version is a standalone game containing 13 frontier boards, in the form of 13 jigsaw pieces, five of which make up the starting game board, which are unlocked gradually by completing the 12 games of this Ticket to Ride version During this version's 12 stages, players must complete tickets and build their fortune as they go from east to west in 19th-century America, successfully managing their own North American railway company through various campaign adventures. This version uses the original basic rules, with the following additional rules specific to this version:

- Money is earned, rather than points, and there are no default dollars in claiming routes like the original, with each player getting two points every time they build a route matching their player colour, and a bonus card if one of the cities connected has a large city icon (a small bonus to players who have completed tickets early).
- There exist both a story deck and a postcard deck; with the former containing cards that are read out before and after each game in the series, offering a faux-historical narrative framework and occasionally setting new rules to incorporate into the game; and the latter being collected after the first game by completing certain tickets, offering rewards, to the player that owns it, if the specified objective has been achieved.
- The train deck has several newspaper cards, shuffled into the train deck, resulting in a revealed event when drawn.

Adrien Martinot (Days of Wonder Game Line Manager), when describing the game, said "With Legends of the West, each game is different, with the story unfolding one layer at a time. New rules and game elements will punctuate this unique play experience, rife with unexpected events and cunning rivals." The game creators noted that they deliberately omitted the real-world exploitation of Native Americans and railroad workers, stating that "We found no way to include [these aspects] within the lighter theme of the game", urging players to research the history in their own time.

Reception – The game received largely positive reviews. Matt Thrower (IGN), while giving the game a 9 out of 10, wrote "A triumphant new turn on an aging series, proving there's good mileage in this old rolling stock yet. There's more than enough novelty here to thrill fans of the franchise without overwhelming less dedicated players, although if you want in, you'll need to commit to the campaign's duration." Mollie Russell (Wargamer), while also giving the game a 9 out of 10, wrote "Ticket to Ride Legacy is a game that feels great, even if the storytelling doesn't back its theme up. The simple concept of the original game translates well to a campaign-based experience, and there are enough treats and surprises to engage a legacy fan of any experience level."

This version was nominated for the following honours:

Accolades
| Award | Date | Category | Result | Ref. |
|---|---|---|---|---|
| Board Game Quest Awards | 2024 | Game of the Year | 2nd place | |
| Game of the Year (Germany) – Spiel des Jahres | 2024 | Connoisseur Game of the Year - (Kennerspiel des Jahres) | Nominated | |
| Geek Media Awards | 2024 | Family Game of the Year | Nominated | |
| Golden Geek | 2023 | Most Innovative Board Game | Nominated | |
| Golden Geek | 2023 | Medium Game of the Year | Nominated | |
| Meeples' Choice Award | 2023 | Three best games of the year | Nominated | |

== Anniversary releases ==
Days of Wonder has produced three anniversary releases for Ticket to Ride. The boards of each of the first two anniversary editions were based on different prior maps of existing stand-alone versions. The playing pieces were more ornate and larger than the trains of those corresponding original versions, meaning they were incompatible with those original versions. These anniversary releases were only in print on the anniversary years from the year Ticket to Ride was first published (2004), thereafter becoming out-of-print.

=== 10th-anniversary ===
On 13 February 2014, Days of Wonder announced the release of a 10th anniversary edition, based on the map in the original version (North America). This version was released during May 2014 in Europe and June 2014 globally (including the United States).

While there were no rule changes to the original game (1910 United States), this anniversary edition had a larger (50%) newly illustrated map, large format playing cards, and metal boxes for its 5 sets of uniquely designed train pieces. The USA 1910 expansion was also included in this anniversary version. Like the original game (1910 United States), this game is also designed to be played with 2–5 players, who are 8-years-old or older, for a game lasting for 30–60 minutes. This game currently has a complexity rating of 1.89 out of 5 on BoardGameGeek. The unique ornate train playing pieces were:

Train playing pieces
| Colour | Carriage type | Railway Company | Ref. |
|---|---|---|---|
| Red | Circus Cars | Savannah, Florida & Circus Railway | |
| Yellow | Barrel Cars | Dutch Flat Barrel Co. | |
| Green | Box Storage Cars | Hobo Caboose Central | |
| Blue | Passenger Cars | Metropolitan Rapid Transit | |
| Red | Coal Cars | Black Powder Rail | |

Reception - The 10th anniversary edition received mixed reviews from critics, who focused mainly on whether the quality of the game's construction justified its significant purchase cost. Piotr S. (Diceland) wrote "Ticket to Ride: 10th Anniversary Edition is not only a beautifully made game that should impress every player, but also the decoration of our collection." (translated) Game Mill wrote "This anniversary edition is really worth it for every Ticket to Ride fan! When it comes to layout and finishing, we are sometimes quite strict, but this version is really of high quality. ... This edition is not cheap, but we dare to say that it is definitely worth the money." (translated) In contrast, Rlyeh (Reviews from Rlyeh) wrote "Make no mistake, Ticket to Ride 10th Anniversary Edition is fundamentally flawed and incomplete. Which flies in the face of Days of Wonder's reputation for attention to detail. Nevertheless, Ticket to Ride 10th Anniversary Edition is still playable and the rules for each of the '1910', 'Big Cities', and the 'Mega Game' variants are available online, but again this is not a satisfactory solution given that this is a highly expensive version of an existing game and a prestigious redesign of Days of Wonder's flagship title." As of 20 August 2026, on BoardGameGeek, the 10th anniversary edition has an average rating of 8.24, and an adjusted "Geek Rating" of 7.369, as a result of votes from 5,672 voting users.

The anniversary edition received the following awards:

Accolades
| Award | Date | Category | Result | Ref. |
|---|---|---|---|---|
| Golden Geek | 2014 | Best Family Board Game | Nominated | |
| Golden Geek | 2014 | Best Board Game Artwork & Presentation | Nominated | |

=== 15th anniversary ===
A special edition was released in late spring (25 June 2021) to celebrate the 15th anniversary of the game, similar to the original's 10th-anniversary edition but based on the map featured in Ticket to Ride: Europe.

While this edition had the same rules as Ticket to Ride: Europe, the rulebook was revised; written in a bigger and clearer font; and even included the use of gender-neutral pronouns, i.e. "their"/"theirs" instead of "he"/"him". This edition included a larger newly designed board and custom train and train station playing pieces in metal tin boxes, with pink instead of green trains. It also featured the destination cards from the original game, Europe 1912, Big Cities of Europe, Orient Express, and a promo card, bringing the count to 108. The card borders and backs were updated and are clearer and more vibrant than in earlier editions. The anniversary edition rules are the same for the base game (Ticket to Ride: Europe) and its extensions, likewise it is designed for 2–5 Players, aged 8-years-old or older, for a game lasting 30–60 minutes. As of 24 January 2025, the game currently has an average rating of 7.53, and an adjusted "Geek Rating" of 7.402, from a vote of 79,413 users. The unique train playing pieces had a distinct colour, matching what type of cargo they carried:

Train playing pieces
| Colour | Carriage type | Railway Company | Ref. |
|---|---|---|---|
| Red | Postal Cars | Western – Postal Express | |
| Brown | Lumber Cars | Cinderella – Export of Timber | |
| Pink | Oil Tank Cars | Violet Star – Quality Fuel | |
| Blue | Auto Cars | Royal Deval – Automobiles | |
| Grey | Spool Cars | Siberian – Steel and Copper | |

Reception – The 15th anniversary edition received mixed reviews from the critics. Matthew Smail (Big Boss Battle) wrote "If table presence was the only factor in whether you should buy a game or not, this edition of a classic game would win almost any contest hands down. Ticket to Ride: 15th Anniversary Edition really does look and feel like a very high quality, premium product that rewards any fan dedicated enough to buy into it." Matt Jarvis (Dice Breaker) wrote "This 15th Anniversary Edition makes significant visual improvements in places, but other additions feel like change for change's sake – or, at worst, a step backward. Maybe we’ll have to hold out hope the 20th Anniversary Edition will finally get things back on track." The 15th Anniversary edition of the game, As of 12 June 2024, has an average rating of 8.22, and an adjusted "Geek Rating" of 7.181, from a vote of 76,361 users on BoardGameGeek.

=== 20th-anniversary ===
The release for the 20th anniversary involved a collection of five limited-edition deluxe train sets, each including 45 finely detailed train cars, along with 3 stations (for Ticket to Ride Europe), and a matching scoring token.

Train playing pieces
| Colour | Carriage type | Ref. |
|---|---|---|
| Red | Passenger Car | |
| Yellow | Crane Train | |
| Greens | Caboose | |
| Blue | Passenger Car | |
| Grey | Flatcar with Semi-Trailer Truck | |

Each of the five train sets featured in this 20th-anniversary collection were available as part of a global premiere launch at the Days of Wonder booth (Location: 6-D200) of the Spiel Game Fair in Essen Germany (3 – 5 October 2024).

== First Journey versions ==
The First Journey series is designed for a younger audience (aged six and older), involving bigger pieces, a smaller board, shorter connections, with a quicker game time (10 – 30 minutes). The games are designed for two to four players. The games in this series were billed as "the perfect introduction to the Ticket to Ride series" for younger players.

The rules of First Journey versions vary from the standalone versions. Notable changes to the rules of the original version include: players are initially awarded only two mission cards, each automatically replaced when one is completed; and a points system is not used, with the winner determined by either the first to complete six destination tickets or the person with the most missions completed when one player places their final train.

=== America ===
This was released in North America as an exclusive in Target stores in 2016. The map is based on a map of America.

Reception – The initial American version won the following awards:

Accolades
| Award | Date | Category | Result | Ref. |
|---|---|---|---|---|
| Gold piece Award (Danish) - (Guldbrikken) | 2017 | Children's Game of the Year | Won | |

=== Europe ===
In 2017, Days of Wonder would also create a version for Europe, with the same rules but a European map.

Reception – The Europe version won the following awards:

Accolades
| Award | Date | Category | Result | Ref. |
|---|---|---|---|---|
| Boardgames Australia Awards | 2017 | Best Children's Game | Won | |

=== Ghost Train ===
On 7 July 2022, Days of Wonder forecast the release of a Junior Version based on the premise of the "chilling journey", revolving around a map of a fictitious "hair-raising" town. This version was released in both Europe and North America in September 2022 and then subsequently globally in October 2022.

== Cities versions ==
Cities versions maps are designed as standalone games featuring the original edition's standard gameplay, but with games that are shorter and smaller than the original edition. Each version in the cities line was designed for 2–4 players who are 8-years-old or older for a game lasting for 10–15 minutes. Allan J. Moon, when introducing the concept of the cities series, wrote "This is the fastest way for new players to enter the Ticket to Ride world, but it's also a rewarding fifteen minutes game for Ticket to Ride veterans." Each of the games in the cities series has a different unique additional scoring mechanism.

=== 1) Ticket to Ride: New York ===
On 15 May 2018, Days of Wonder announced that a new "express" version of Ticket to Ride was being released called Ticket to Ride: New York, based on a 1960s map of the city of New York City (New York, United States). This version was released in North America and Europe in July 2018, and was released in the United States on 8 July 2018 exclusively through Target stores.

This version has a BoardGameGeek "complexity rating" of 1.25 out of 5. The unique point scoring feature was the claiming routes into tourist attraction destinations. Instead of trains, the playing pieces were taxis. The transportation cards represented a variety of common New York transport options:

Transportation Cards
| Colour | Mode of Transportation |
|---|---|
| Red | Bus |
| Orange | Yellow school Bus |
| Green | Bus |
| Blue | Train carriage |
| Purple | Double-Decker Bus |
| Black | Subway carriage |
| Multicoloured wild | Yellow cab |

Reception – The game received positive reviews, with the majority of reviews focusing on the difference of the new cities-style of game from the format of the original versions. Mathew Bolton (T3 magazine), while giving the version 5 out of 5 stars, wrote "I think if you play it over and over, every week, you might find that it lacks variety, but in all other cases, it's fantastic value for money." Matt Jarvis (Table Top Gaming) wrote "What Ticket to Ride: New York lacks in staying power compared to its bigger sibling, it absolutely makes up for with a breathless pace and absurdly compact size. Keep Ticket to Ride on your dining table – play Ticket to Ride: New York everywhere else." While receiving praise, recurring general criticism of the cities line have been made. Andy Matthews (Meeple Mountain) wrote "Days of Wonder have released a game which gives you the Ticket to Ride experience in a fraction of the time, but perhaps at the expense of long-term strategy."

Emphasis was placed on its veracity as an introductory version to the Ticket to Ride series. Derek Thompson (Geek under Grace) wrote "This is the definitive travel edition / lunchtime version of Ticket to Ride. It never overstays its welcome. It's a great introduction to the series for new players, and it's a great snack for gamers who don't have time for the full meal." While awarding a 4 out of 5, AnnaMaria Jackson-Phelps (Board Game Quest) wrote "Ticket to Ride: New York introduces nothing new but it's a great way to introduce new players to Ticket to Ride. Simplified rules and a smaller footprint make for faster teaching, faster setup, and faster games. Tourism in the Big Apple theme is enhanced by the breakneck speed of play, as well as the focus on taxis and notable Manhattan attractions." Andy Matthews (Meeple Mountain) wrote "With New York, Ticket to Ride proves yet again that it is one of the strongest brands in board gaming. This game is an excellent way to introduce your non-gaming friends to board gaming in a manner that's fast, fun, and easy to teach. ... Great little simplification of the Ticket to Ride series will make a great teaching tool, but doesn't add anything for seasoned players." Whilst giving the game a 4 out of 5, Board Gaming wrote "Ticket To Ride is a classic game and there is a reason why it has won so many awards. Its accessibility for those not accustomed to the modern era of board gaming means everyone will enjoy it."

As of 24 January 2025, based on a vote of 242 voting users, this version holds an average rating of 7.37 and an adjusted "Geek Rating" of 5.693 on BoardGameGeek.

=== 2) Ticket to Ride: London ===
On 2 April 2019, Days of Wonder foreshadowed the release of a second installment to the cities line called Ticket to Ride: London, based on a 1970s map of London (England, United Kingdom). It was released in June 2019 in Europe and in July 2019 in North America, exclusively through Walmart in the United States.

This version has a BoardGameGeek "complexity rating" of 1.34 out of 5. This version used bus playing pieces instead of trains. The game's unique scoring feature was based on the number of districts a player fully connects with their bus playing pieces. The transport cards are modes of transport immortalised by famous British songs, film and TV series:

Transportation Cards
| Colour | Mode of Transport | Cultural Reference |
|---|---|---|
| Orange | Dino 246 GTS | The Persuaders! television series |
| Yellow | Submarine | "Yellow Submarine" by The Beatles |
| Green | Lotus Seven | The Prisoner television series |
| Blue | Dairy Pure milk truck | "No Milk Today" by Herman's Hermits |
| Pink | Rocket Man car | "Space Oddity" by David Bowie which inspired "Rocket Man" by Elton John |
| Black | London cab | "London Calling" by The Clash |
| Multicoloured wild | Red double-decker bus (AEC Routemaster) | The Austin Powers franchise |

Reception – The reviews of this London version were largely positive. Andrew Borck (Geeks under Grace) wrote "This might be an odd game to start with in the Ticket to Ride line, but London does have a lot to offer in a small package. Especially for players looking for a quick route-building duel game or filler title. If you're a die-hard Ticket to Ride fan or looking for a quick, easy to setup and play game, well then London is calling." Chris Way (opinionated Gamer) wrote "Ticket to Ride is beautiful in its simplicity, and that shines through in London. I enthusiastically recommend this new entry in the famed series." On BoardGameGeek, As of 24 January 2025, from a vote of 5,151 voting users, this version holds an average rating of 7.07 and an adjusted "Geek Rating" of 6.581.

=== 3) Ticket to Ride: Amsterdam ===
On 7 May 2020, Days of Wonder announced the pending release of a version called Ticket to Ride: Amsterdam, based on a 17th-century map of the city of Amsterdam (Netherlands). This version was released in the Netherlands on 31 July 2020. Foreshadowed for a September 2020 release in North America generally, this version was available on 2 October 2020 in Canada and on 16 October 2020 in the United States.

This version has a BoardGameGeek "complexity rating" of 1.54 out of 5. Instead of trains, the playing pieces were horse-drawn carts. The unique scoring mechanism for this version was the accumulation of merchandise bonus cards, from routes claimed with a merchant cart on them located at the perimeter of the city. The transportation cards depict a variety of 17th-century scenes:

Transportation cards
| Colour | Mode of transport |
|---|---|
| Red | Handcart |
| Orange | Oar-steered boat |
| Yellow | Draught animal-pulled covered wagon |
| Green | Pack animal |
| Blue | Sailboat |
| Purple | Barrel-rolling |
| Multicoloured Wild | Handcart and pack horse |

Reception – Reviews were mixed. Andrew Borck (Geeks under Grace) wrote "Overall it's a fun little addition to the Ticket to Ride line, but it doesn't add so much that you need to get it if you already have a similar small-box Ticket to Ride game. But as an entry-point game, it excels and will easily draw people in who might balk at the original's 60+ minute playtime." On BoardGameGeek, As of 24 January 2025, from a vote of 1,599 voting users, it holds an average rating of 6.93 and an adjusted "Geek Rating" of 6.081.

=== 4) Ticket to Ride: San Francisco ===
On 5 May 2022, Days of Wonder announced the pending release of its fourth entry in the cities series entitled Ticket to Ride: San Francisco, based on a 1960s map of the San Francisco Bay Area (California, United States). In June 2022, this version was initially released in the United States, exclusively through Target stores, subsequently being realised through other United States retailers during its global release in August 2022.

This version has a BoardGameGeek "complexity rating" of 1.73 out of 5. Instead of trains, the pieces were cable cars. The unique scoring feature was the collection of cardboard tourist tokens of the city's famous landmarks positioned around the board. The transport cards depicted specific modes of transportation prevalent in San Francisco:

Transportation Cards
| Colour | Mode of Transport |
|---|---|
| Red | Cable car |
| Orange | Trolley car (Yellow line) |
| Green | Car (Ford Mustang) |
| Blue | Trolley car (Blue line) |
| Purple | Van (Volkswagen Type 2) |
| Black | Bus |
| Multicoloured Wild | Ferry |

Reception – Critical reception was largely positive. As of 24 January 2025, on BoardGameGeek, from a vote of 1,116 voting users, this version holds an average rating of 7.18 and an adjusted "Geek Rating" of 6.048. Andy Matthews (Meeple Mountain) wrote "If you love Ticket to Ride and you'd like to expand your collection, San Francisco is a good addition. If you're just curious about the city versions, either San Francisco or New York are great choices." However, for some critics this version compared less favourably to other versions in the cities series. Derek Thompson (Geeks under Grace) wrote "I can't easily recommend it over New York, Amsterdam, or London, because I don't especially love the tokens. On one hand, I'm glad there are far fewer tokens to mess with than Ticket to Ride: Netherlands had. On the other hand, for me these small maps are also a pathway for my kids from Ticket to Ride: First Journey to regular Ticket to Ride. In that regard, I don't like having many extra rules, and I also find having the second player add the tokens somewhere kind of clunky, and confusing for young kids ... It's still Ticket to Ride, so it's still great, but I'd get it last among the current offerings in the line."

=== 5) Ticket to Ride: Berlin ===
On 9 May 2023, Days of Wonder announced a fifth instalment in the cities line entitled Ticket to Ride: Berlin, based on a map of 'current day' (2023) Berlin (Germany) featuring landmarks in the downtown area. This version was released on 25 August 2023.

This version has a BoardGameGeek "complexity rating" of 1.5 out of 5. The unique aspect of this game was that it used both tram (street car) and underground (subway) playing pieces, instead of overground train carriage tokens, with routes specifically requiring the use of one of the two new types of playing pieces. The transport cards depicted specific modes of transportation prevalent in Berlin:

Transportation Cards
| Colour | Mode of Transport |
|---|---|
| Red | Train |
| Orange | Train |
| Green | Tram |
| Blue | Taxi |
| Purple | Bus |
| Black | Water taxi |
| Multicoloured Wild | Bicycle |

Reception – Reception to the Berlin map was largely positive. Adam Roffel (Game Reviews) wrote "If you love Ticket to Ride as a game franchise, I think Berlin is the best small-box adaptation available." On BoardGameGeek, As of 24 January 2025 based on a vote of 448 voting users, this version holds an average rating of 7.26 and an adjusted "Geek Rating" of 5.792.

=== 6) Ticket to Ride: Paris ===
On 2 February 2024, Days of Wonder announced the sixth release in the Cities line entitled Ticket to Ride: Paris, based on a map of 1920s Paris (France). This version was released globally on 29 March 2024

The unique scoring mechanism is the gaining of victory points by the waving of flags to celebrate Bastille Day through the completion of blue, white, and red route combinations. Instead of trains, the playing pieces were buses.

== Map collections ==
From 14 February 2011 until 15 April 2011, Alan J. Moon ran a Ticket to Ride Map Design Contest with an advertised $10,000 grand prize, to form the initial basis of a series of expansion maps. On 29 August 2011, it was announced that, of the 612 Ticket to Ride fans and prospective game designers from 40 different countries who competed, two competitors had won $10,000 each for their respective maps, i.e. Legendary Asia and India, which formed the basis of the first two volumes of the "Map Collections" series. Each game in the "Map Collections" series introduced new rules specific to that version, and required pieces from either the original or the Europe version of Ticket to Ride to play. The following Map Collections have been released to date:

=== Volume 1: Asia – Team Asia and Legendary Asia ===
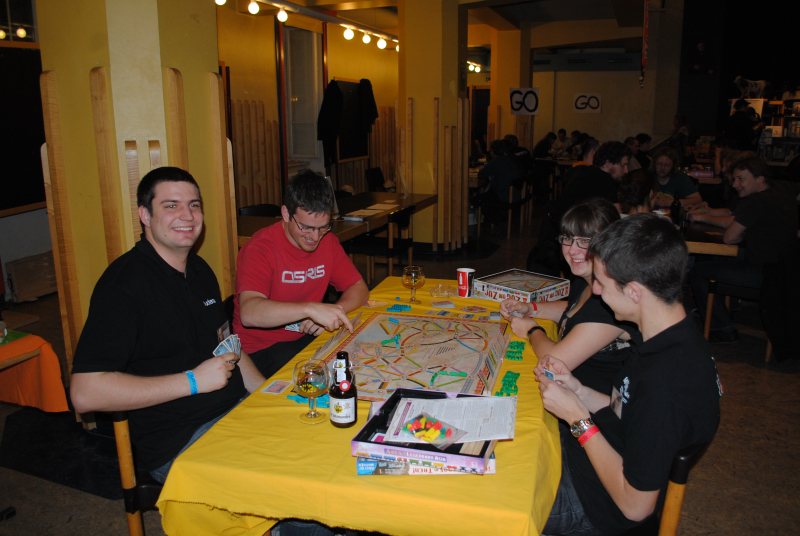
A game of Ticket to Ride – Asia being played

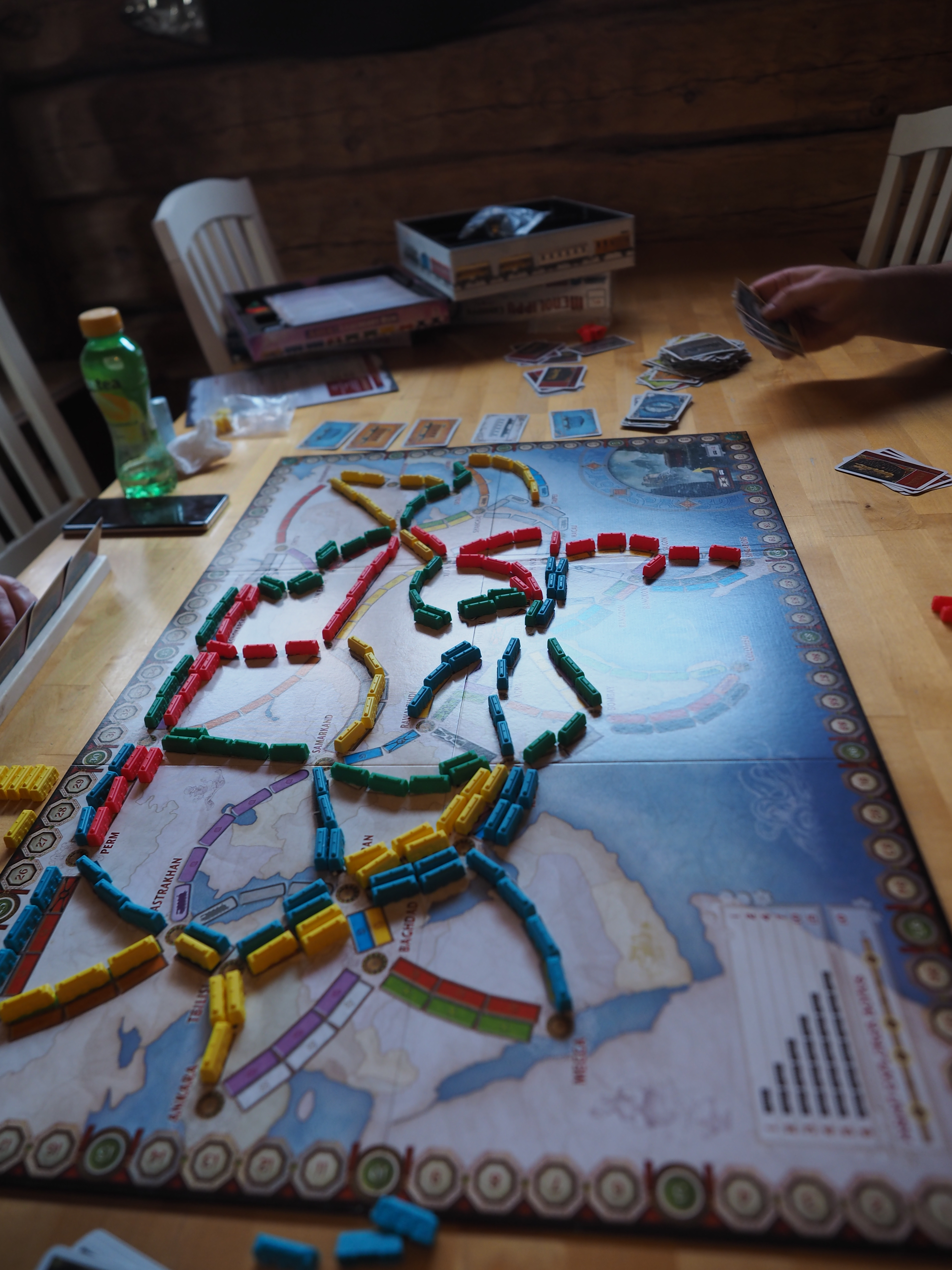
A game of Legendary Asia, part of the Ticket to Ride – Asia version, played in Korpilampi, Espoo (Finland)

On 29 August 2011, Days of Wonder announced the release of the first two volumes of a range of map expansions. The initial volume was entitled Volume 1: Asia – Team Asia and Legendary Asia, and featured a double-sided map of both Asia and Legendary Asia. The Legendary Asia map, submitted by François Valentyne of Toronto (Canada), was one of the two $10,000 grand prize winners of the 2011 Ticket to Ride Map Design Contest. This expansion premiered at Spiel '11 (20–23 October 2011) in Essen (Germany), after which it had a global release in late October 2011.

This expansion currently has a BoardGameGeek "complexity rating" of 1.96 out of 5. Both maps are designed for players who were 8-years-old or older, for a game lasting 30–60 minutes. The unique feature of the Team Asia was that it was designed for two-member teams, to be played by even numbers of 2–6 players. The unique aspect of the Legendary Asia side was that it involved mountain routes, costing additional trains to build but giving bonus points. Legendary Asia was designed to be played by 2–5 players.

Reception – On BoardGameGeek, as of 4 August 2026, from a vote of 6,471 voting users, this version holds an average rating of 7.65 and an adjusted "Geek Rating" of 7.046. The opinion of critics was favourable, with the consensus favouring the Team Asia side. Shannon Appelcline (RPG), while giving an overall 5 out of 5 for "style" and "substance", only gave an individual score of 4 out of 5 for substance for Legendary Asia, writing "Ticket to Ride Asia offers two new and varied maps which will add some nice variety to your Ticket to Ride play. It's well worthwhile just on that basis, given the very reasonable price point. However, Ticket to Ride Asia really knocks things out of the park with its Team Asia rules, which allow you to play as partners for 4-player or 6-player games. The result is one of the most enjoyable, stressful, and innovative ways to play Ticket to Ride since the release of the original game." Dale Yu (Opinionated Gamers) wrote "I definitely like the ideas in Legendary Asia, but I suspect that it is the Team Asia map that will cause me to take this one off the shelf more."

=== Volume 2: India + Switzerland ===
On 29 August 2011, Days of Wonder foreshadowed the release of an expansion entitled Volume 2: India + Switzerland based on a 1911 map of India on one side and a map of Switzerland on the other. The India map was submitted by Ian Vincent, who was one of the two $10,000 grand prize winners of the 2011 Ticket to Ride Map Design Contest. The Switzerland map was a re-release of the 2007 Ticket to Ride: Switzerland edition's map. This expansion was released in December 2011.

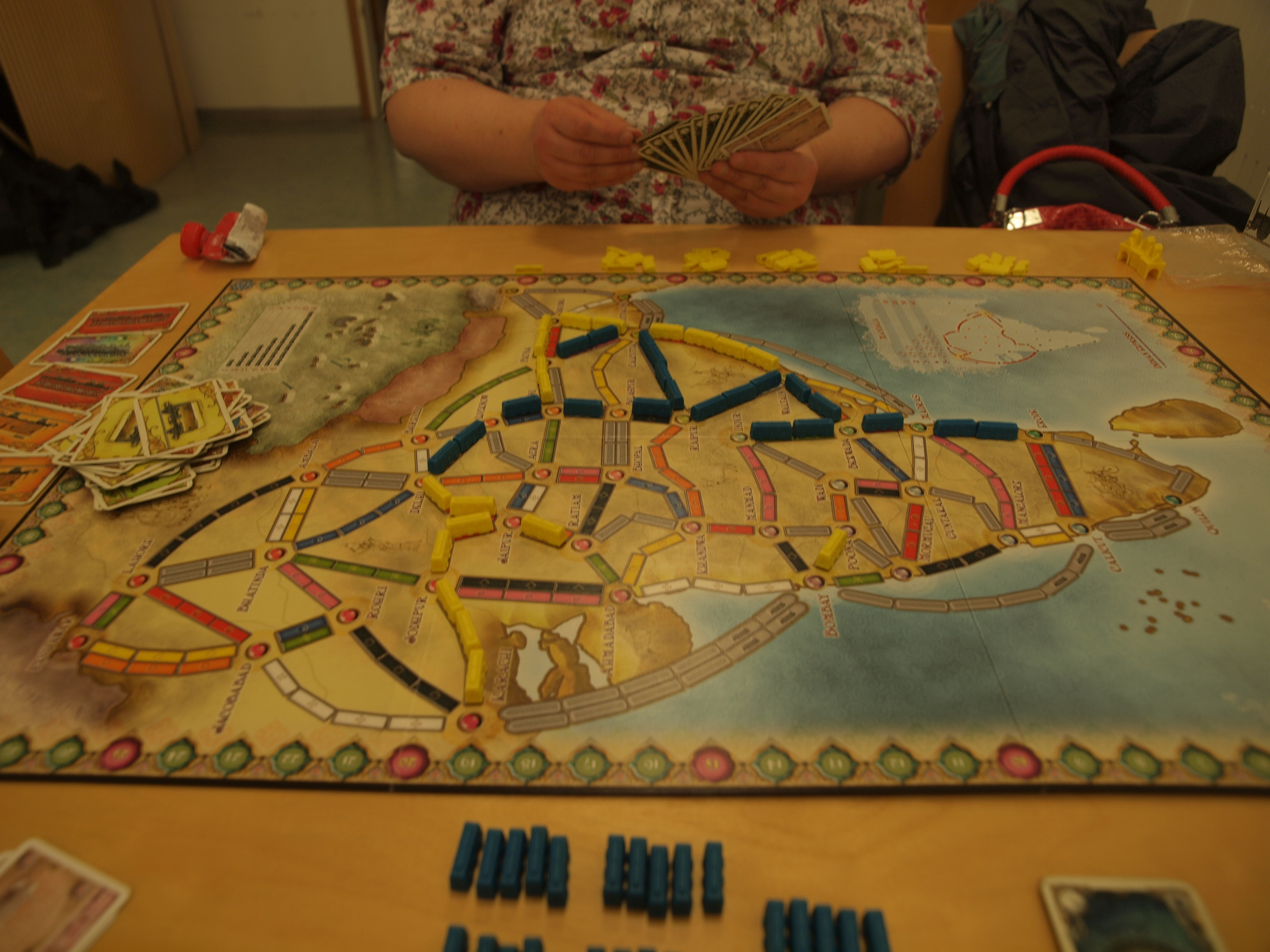
A two-player game of Ticket to Ride – India being played at a free board game event in Herttoniemi, Helsinki, Uusimaa (Finland)

This expansion currently has a BoardGameGeek "complexity rating" of 2.02 out of 5. Both maps in this expansion were designed for players who are 8-years-old or older for a game lasting 30–60 minutes, however, the Indian map was designed for 2–4 players, while the Switzerland map was designed for 2–3 players. India had a unique bonus for connecting destinations in a mandala (loop of routes).

Reception – Shannon Appelcline (RPG), while giving it a 5 out of 5 for "style" and a 4 out of 5 for "substance" wrote "Overall, Ticket to Ride Switzerland is just as good as any other Ticket to Ride game, and that means it's a lot of fun to play, has great tension, and allows good strategy for a short game. I've given it a slightly lower rating than previous games, because it's no longer fresh and innovative, but it still earns an above average 4 out of 5 for Substance." On BoardGameGeek, as of 24 January 2025, from a vote of 6,236 voting users, this expansion holds an average rating of 7.77 and an adjusted "Geek Rating" of 7.173.

=== Volume 3: The Heart of Africa ===
On 24 September 2012, Days of Wonder foreshadowed the then upcoming release of an expansion entitled Volume 3: The Heart of Africa, based on a 1910 map of the Africa continent. It was released in December 2012.

This expansion currently has a BoardGameGeek "complexity rating" of 2.05 out of 5. This version's unique feature was "terrain cards", which gave a double point bonus when claiming a route if the "terrain cards" matched the routes claimed. The game was designed for 2–5 players who are 8-years-old or older, for a game lasting 30–60 minutes.

Reception – This extension received largely favourable reviews, with especially positive mentions about the unique "terrain card" mechanism. Matt Morgan (Wired) wrote "Worth the challenge. Ticket to Ride hasn't been this competitive in a while, and new terrain cards keep the game fresh." Shannon Appelcline (RPGNet), while giving the game a 5 out of 5 for "style", gave this expansion a 4 out of 5 for "substance", writing Ticket to Ride Map Collection 3: The Heart of Africa offers up some terrific play for experienced Ticket to Ride game players. The tightness of the map and the additional level of strategy created by the new rules combine to create a more interesting, more thoughtful, and more tense game.", but adding "It's got some good material for Ticket to Ride players, but I'd suggest getting the other two Map Collections first." On BoardGameGeek, as of 21 August 2026, based on a vote of 3,309 voting users, this version holds an average rating of 7.38 and an adjusted "Geek Rating" of 6.625.

=== Volume 4: Nederland ===
On 17 September 2013, Days of Wonder foreshadowed a fourth expansion called Volume 4: Nederland, based on a single-sided map of the Netherlands. The expansion premiered at Spiel '13 (24–27 October 2013) in Essen (Germany), to launch its simultaneous European release, after which it had its global release in November 2013.

This expansion currently has a BoardGameGeek "complexity rating" of 2.13 out of 5. The game was designed for 2–5 players, who are 8-years-old or older, for a game lasting 30–60 minutes. This was the first Ticket to Ride version with a currency system, used to pay bridge tolls for a player's routes. A bridge toll bonus is awarded at the end of the game, the total of which is related to the total worth of bridge toll tokens held by each player, in relationship to each other. Allan J. Moon wrote:

"Players must manage their limited treasury and this affects their choices of routes. The huge bonus for the most money at the end of the game makes it even harder to spend money during the game. Most of the time, the player with the most economically efficient route will win."

Reception – The toll system was criticised. Edwin van de Sluis (Gamepack) wrote "At the end there seems to be an accidental winner of the end bonus so it seems (or feels). Playing with a focus on both end bonus and fulfilling tickets seems pretty difficult, so it seems, and raises the question whether this is possible at all." As of 20 August 2026, BoardGameGeek, from a vote of 3,131 voting users, gives this version an average rating of 7.35 and an adjusted "Geek Rating" rating of 6.531.

=== Volume 5: United Kingdom + Pennsylvania ===
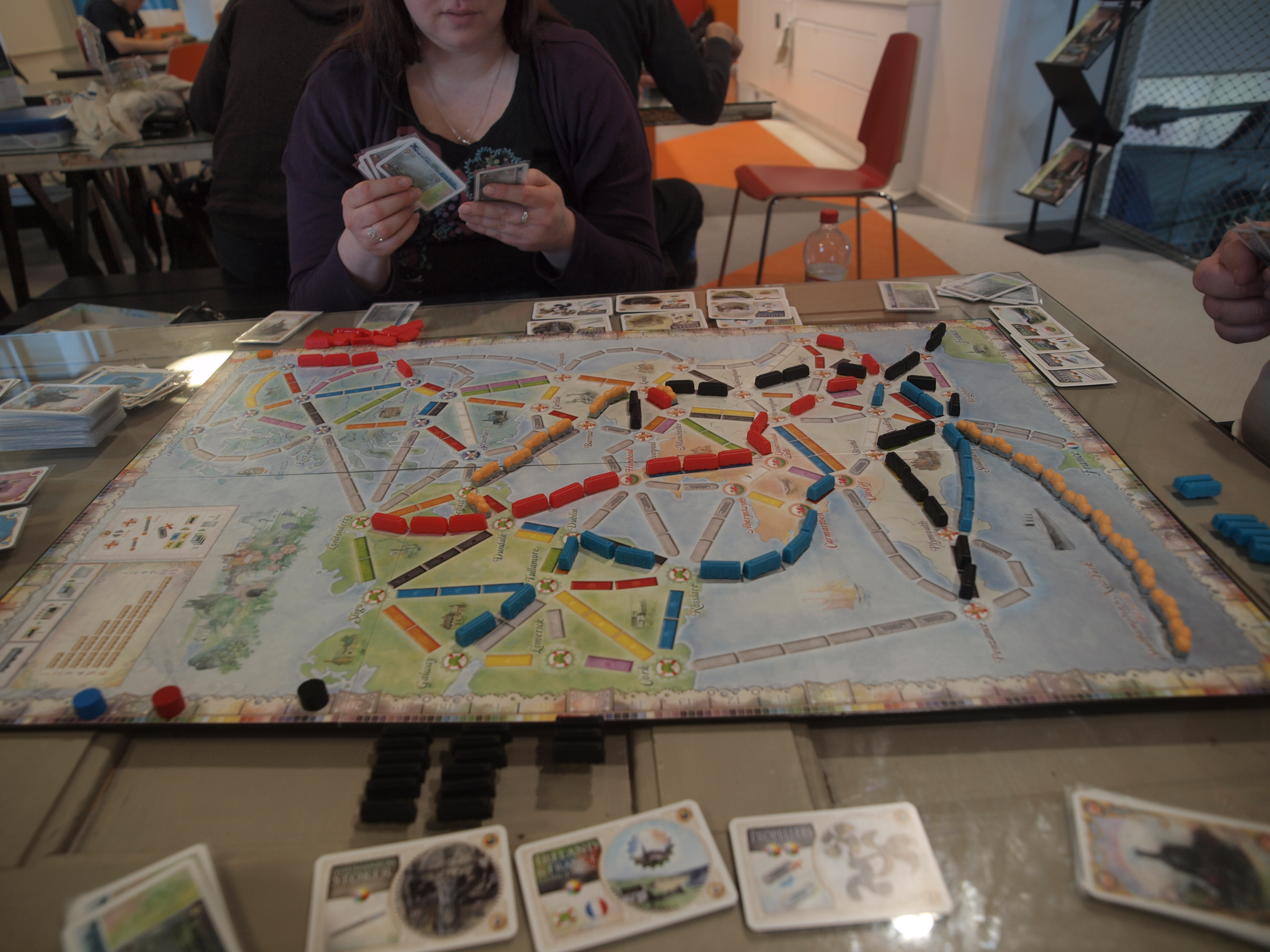
A game of Ticket to Ride – United Kingdom, being played at JunaCon VIII in Kupittaa, Turku (Finland)

On 25 August 2015, Days of Wonder announced the upcoming release of an expansion entitled Volume 5: United Kingdom + Pennsylvania based on a double-sided map, with a map of turn of the 19th-century United Kingdom on one side and a map of Pennsylvania on the other. This expansion premiered at booths 1-F122 and 3-B108 of Spiel '15 (8–11 October 2015) in Essen (Germany), shortly before its Europe release, after which, this expansion had a global release in November 2015.

Currently, this expansion has a BoardGameGeek "complexity rating" of 2.30 out of 5. United Kingdom introduces a unique technology system, requiring upgrades to complete certain routes, while Pennsylvania introduces a unique stock market system. This expansion was designed for 2–5 players, at least 8 years old, for a game lasting for 30–75 minutes. Alan J. Moon wrote:

"Ticket to Ride Pennsylvania is perhaps the simplest expansion of all in terms of the additional rules, but adds a lot to the strategic choices of what routes to build and when to build them. Don't be surprised to see this mechanic or something close to it in future expansions."

Ticket to Ride United Kingdom on the other hand changes the basic system more than any other expansion. The limited starting technology forces players to make some early strategic choices, often forcing them to all build in the same area around London, and vying for crucial routes in the north of England. But as the game continues, players can take quite a few different paths to victory, focusing on bonus points, on tickets, on long routes, and more.

Reception – Critical reaction to this expansion was mixed. Owen Duffy wrote "For fans of Ticket to Ride, this is a great addition to a favourite game. If you're a former player who's moved on to other things, then the UK Map Pack might just draw you back in. It keeps the core simplicity that's made the game a worldwide hit, but it adds a level of depth and variety that's fresh and challenging. It manages all of this without venturing into the level of complexity you'll find in niche titles aimed at hardcore train enthusiasts. If that sounds like your idea of fun, climb aboard!" Dan Street Phillips (Toy Street), while rating it 4.70 out of 5 based on 5913 Reviews, wrote "This collection, for me, adds some of the most exciting and interesting mechanisms into the game. The stocks are great but what really shines in the Ticket To Ride United Kingdom map and all of its technologies. If you have played the base game enough for it to get a little stale then jump on board and buy a ticket for the sunny isle of Great Britain!" In contrast there was some negative criticisms. Matt Thrower (There will be Games), while awarding the expansion 2 out of 5, wrote "UK map is a disappointment. The new technology mechanic feels like a crapshoot and actually seems to narrow the strategies available rather than increase them. Pennsylvania map is much better, and the added points from company investment is interesting, but not good enough to make the whole worthwhile." Miniature Market, while giving the expansion a 2.5 out of 5, wrote that "All in all, this expansion's biggest flaw is being rather unremarkable. It's fine, but nothing special. ... If you're tired of putting plastic trains down from Seattle to New York, you could do worse than playing UK/Pennsylvania. You could do better as well, but you could do worse." As of 24 January 2025, on BoardGameGeek, from a vote of 5,953 voting users, this version holds an average rating of 7.98 and an adjusted "Geek Rating" of 7.290. This expansion received the following award recognition:

Accolades
| Award | Date | Category | Result | Ref. |
|---|---|---|---|---|
| BoardGameGeek – Golden Geek Award | 2015 | Best Board Game Expansion | Won | |

=== Volume 6: France + Old West ===
On 22 August 2017, Days of Wonder announced the pending release of an expansion called Volume 6: France + Old West, based on a map of late 19th-century France, described as being "set during the height of Impressionism and the Industrial Revolution", on one side and a 19th-century map of the old west on the other. This expansion premiered at Spiel '17 (26 – 29 October 2017) in Essen, Germany, at the same time as its October release in Europe, after which the expansion was released in the United States in November 2017.

Currently, this expansion has a BoardGameGeek "complexity rating" of 2.10 out of 5. The unique aspect of the France map was that most of the routes on the board are not colored track routes, but rather track beds, requiring each player to lay tracks to decide the colour of the route in advance, before any player can claim that route. The main unique aspect of the Old West map was that train routes were only able to be claimed, when connected to a player's own initially placed city, either directly or through that player's own train routes. An additional optional unique feature of the Old West map was that 10 points were scored by a player reaching Roswell, thus activating the "Alvin the Alien" counter piece which was moved from station to station throughout the game, and/or possessing the "Alvin the Alien" piece at the end of the game. Both maps in this expansion were designed for 2–6 players, who are 8-years-old or older, for a game lasting for 60–90 minutes.

Reception – This expansion gained some negative reviews. Andrew Smith (Board Game Quest), while grading it with a "pass", wrote "Even for the most die-hard fans, it is hard to recommend. As a one-time experience, the France and Old West expansion isn't bad, but I can't imagine myself wanting to continue to pull this off the shelf. It feels like a longer, more annoying version of the same game and the France track laying is way more trouble than its worth. There are plenty of other map packs that give you more variety without all the restrictions and longer play time." However, on BoardGameGeek, as of 24 January 2025, from a vote of 1,958 voting users, this version holds an average rating of 7.62 and an adjusted "Geek Rating" of 6.512.

=== Volume 6 1/2: Poland ===
On 28 June 2019, an expansion of Ticket to Ride was released based on a map of 1950s Poland, but this time as a Polish language version created and released exclusively for the Polish market, published by Rebel under the Polish name Wsiąść do Pociągu – Polska. In early December 2019, an English version was accessible throughout the rest of Europe from online merchants, through a limited sale lasting until January 2020. On 19 April 2022, it was announced that a physical version of the Poland expansion would have a wider release as an English version, being available in July 2022 throughout Europe and in September 2022 throughout North America.

Currently, this expansion has a BoardGameGeek "complexity rating" of 1.67 out of 5. The recommendation is that it is played with 2–4 people, who are 8-years-old or older, for a game lasting 30–60 minutes. This expansion has the smallest map board in the series, having only 4 sections as opposed to the standard 6. Gameplay has an emphasis on connections between neighbouring countries for bonus points.

Reception – The expansion received overall positive, but not ecstatic, reviews. Andrew Borck (Geeks under Grace), while giving this version a 7 out of 10, wrote "The new mechanic of connecting neighboring countries is a nice way to get more points, and it forces players to go to the edges of the map." but added that this was a version that "Brings new ideas to the table, but ultimately not a 'must buy' expansion." On BoardGameGeek, from a vote of 680 voting users, this version holds an average rating of 7.48 and an adjusted "Geek Rating" of 5.969.

=== Volume 7: Japan + Italy ===
On 10 September 2019 Days of Wonder announced the pending release of an expansion called Volume 7: Japan + Italy, based on a map of current day (2019) Japan on one side and early 20th century Italy on the other. It premiered at booth 3-B107 of Spiel '19 (24 – 27 October 2019) in Essen, Germany, slightly ahead of its November 2019 European release. Subsequently, it was released in the United States on 31 January 2020 as part of its January 2020 North American release, and then in mid-February 2020 in Japan via Hobby Japan.

Currently, this expansion has a BoardGameGeek "complexity rating" of 2.07 out of 5. The unique aspect of the Japan side is the Shinkansen, whose bullet train routes are collaboratively built and accessible to anyone, so when one of those routes is claimed all players can use it to complete destination tickets, with the player/s who contributed more to the shared project getting a larger bonus. The reverse Italy side features a new ferry route mechanism, i.e. instead of drawing two train cards you can draw one ferry card, and adds a new scoring rule for Italian provinces. There is no "Globetrotter" or "Longest Route" bonus in either the Italy or Japan game. The recommendation is that it is played with 2–5 players, who are aged 8 or older, for a game lasting between 30 and 60 minutes.

Reception – Game Board Memo, in a review of the Italy side that gave it a 7/10, wrote that "In terms of the balance between the lack of additional rules and the amount of fun, the cost performance is on par with the German map." Jessica Walker (Zatu Games), while giving this expansion a score of 90%, wrote "Ticket to Ride Japan and Italy is an excellent expansion and both maps offer very different Ticket to Ride experiences from one another. Japan is one of the best and most unique Ticket to Ride maps available. Italy is more standard but is a fun map nonetheless. Neither map is too much of a step up in rules from either Ticket to Ride or Ticket to Ride Europe. If you have played the base game a lot and want to spice things up, this expansion is the perfect place to start." (Geeks under Grace) wrote "Overall, it's a really good package, with only a few minor downfalls. It's a bit pricey and the box is way too big (though you could combine some map packs into this box). While the Italy map is not super exciting, I'm still happy to get two maps instead of one, and Japan is one of the best maps they've ever done for Ticket to Ride. If your group still plays Ticket to Ride regularly, then this is an expansion worth getting." On BoardGameGeek, from a vote of 2,170 voting users, this version holds an average rating of 7.90 and an adjusted "Geek Rating" of 6.693.

=== Stay at Home ===
On 28 May 2020, Days of Wonder announced their release of an expansion called Stay at Home, in recognition of the global lockdown which resulted from the COVID-19 pandemic. Ticket to Ride: Stay at Home marked the first time that an expansion in the Ticket to Ride series had been set entirely inside a house, where instead of forming railway routes between cities across the world, players controlled family members as they moved around the house from locations, like the balcony, kitchen and bedroom, as they attempted to go about their daily lives. This version functioned as an expansion of the original, Europe, Germany, or Nordic Countries Ticket to Rides, based on a print-out of a pdf map download.

Currently, this expansion has a BoardGameGeek "complexity rating" of 2.00 out of 5. The game was designed to be played by 2–4 players, aged 8 years-old and over, for a game lasting 20–40 minutes. This expansion had a unique game mechanism involving multicolored "family routes" onto which multiple players can place their train cars along it, with players who had at least one train along it being able to use it to complete their missions.

Reception – On BoardGameGeek, from a vote of 184 voting users, this version holds an average rating of 5.623 and an adjusted "Geek Rating" of 7.10. This expansion received the following award recognition:

Accolades
| Award | Date | Category | Result | Ref. |
|---|---|---|---|---|
| BoardGameGeek – Golden Geek Award | 2020 | Best Print & Play Board Game | Nominated | |

=== Volume 8: Iberia + South Korea ===
In 2024, Days of Wonder and Asmodee foreshadowed on their respective websites the 28 June 2024 release of a new expansion entitled Volume 8: Iberia + South Korea, based on a map of the Iberian Peninsula (Spain and Portugal), on one side and South Korea on the other. The Iberia map had originally been published as an unofficial fan expansion in 2015.

The two unique aspects of the Iberian map was a ticket draft mechanism, featured at the start of the game and during play; and a festival mechanism. Moon had claimed that this map had replaced Switzerland as his favourite map. This version does not have a longest road bonus. The unique aspect of the Korean map was the grouping of routes into colours.

This expansion currently has a "complexity rating" on BoardGameGeek of 2 out of 5. Both maps in the expansion are designed for 2–4 players, who are 8-years-old or older, for a game lasting 30–60 minutes.

== Non-board game versions ==
=== Ticket to Ride: The Card Game ===
On 25 February 2008, Days of Wonder announced the pending release of a card game set in the United States, entitled Ticket to Ride – The Card Game, by way of a portable version of the Ticket to Ride franchise concept. The card game was released in May 2008, and was available in 10 languages.

Players were dealt 6 destination tickets (keeping at least 1), 1 locomotive card, and 7 other train cards. The destination tickets had a colour code of 1 to 5 coloured dots, matching the colours of the train cards. The train cards were moved from the player's hand to their own playing area ("rail yard") and then the player's scoring area ("on-the-track stack") The standard turn options were that a player would firstly move a card of each train colour from the player's rail yard destination tickets to their own on-the-track stack; and secondly chose to complete one of three options:

- Drawing two train cards;
- Tabling train cards, i.e., either two or more of the same colour or exactly three of three different colours, into that player's own rail yard;
- Drawing 4 destination cards, any of which could be discarded in that turn.

During play, train cards whose colour was already present in any opponents' rail yard could not be played unless they out-numbered the opponent players' cards of that colour, thus resulting in those lower number of cards of that colour being removed from all the opponents' rail yards, a move known as "train robbing". When the train card draw pile was exhausted, the players used the train cards in their on-the-track stack to complete their destination tickets by matching the coloured train cards with the coloured dots on the destination tickets. Scoring was based on the success of completing destination tickets, by expending train cards from the player's "on-the-track stack" for a match of each destination card's required colour combination, thus adjusting the player's final score by adding the destination ticket's point value if completed or subtracting it if uncompleted. A bonus existed for the most destination tickets completed involving six big cities (Chicago, Dallas, Los Angeles, Miami, New York City, and Seattle).

The card game is playable in 30 minutes and supports 2–4 players, who are 8 years-old or older. The card game has a complexity rating of 1.88 on BoardGameGeek.

Reception – Ticket to Ride: The Card Game has gained an average rating of 6.12, and an adjusted 'Geek Rating' of 5.887, as a result of the responses from 4,085 voting users, on BoardGameGeek. This card game has also achieved the following distinctions:

Accolades
| Award | Date | Category | Result | Ref. |
|---|---|---|---|---|
| Fairplay's Annual Card Game Award | 2008 | À la carte (Card Game Prize) | Won | |
| Boardgames Australia Awards | 2009 | Best International Game | Nominated | |
| BoardGameGeek – Golden Geek Award | 2008 | Best Card Game | Nominated | |
| BoardGameGeek – Golden Geek Award | 2009 | Best Card Game | Nominated | |
| JoTa Awards | 2009 | Best Card Game | Nominated | |

=== Ticket to Ride: Track Switcher ===
On 6 February 2021, Days of Wonder foreshadowed the release of a single-player brain-teaser puzzle set in 1900 United States, with a Ticket to Ride theme. The puzzle was a collaboration between Days of Wonder and Mixlore, the label behind the Logiquest range of 3D brainteasers. The game had a global release in October 2021, and was available in 13 languages.

In the puzzle, players had to slide their train engine around slotted tracks in the board, collecting and connecting multicoloured carriages in a specific order to solve each of the supplied 40 puzzles. In addition to that, players had to track the number of moves they took on a dial, aiming to use as few turns as possible to solve the scenario and earn the most stars, resulting in the train leaving on time.

Reception – While giving this puzzle a 7 out of 10, Stephen Hall wrote "While these puzzles do not feel like their source material, they do provide some entertaining challenges."

== Hoax versions ==
=== Ticket to Ride: A Moon's Adventure ===
As part of April Fool's Day (1 April 2024), via its Facebook page, Days of Wonder forecast the release of an addition to the Cities line entitled Ticket to Ride: A Moon Adventure, designed for 12 players (the 12 astronauts who had set foot on the Moon), with the unique objective being to complete missions before blasting off back to Earth, and a release date 6 years in the future (horizon of 2030). The transport cards were supposedly types of rockets with the wild cards as satellites.

== Digital versions ==
Ticket to Ride was also published digitally in the following formats:

Digital version formats of Ticket to Ride
| Format | Launch date | Ref. |
|---|---|---|
| JavaScript Browser version | 15 November 2004 | |
| Apple Macintosh version | 7 January 2006 | |
| Microsoft Windows version | 21 February 2006 | |
| XBox version | 25 June 2008 | |
| IPad version | 19 May 2011 | |
| IPhone & iPod Touch version | 16 November 2011 | |
| Android version | 5 June 2013 | |
| Linux version | 15 October 2013 | |
| PlayStation version | 13 November 2018 | |
| Windows App version | 10 December 2019 | |
| Alexa version | 14 November 2019 | |
| Board Game Arena version | 28 September 2022 | |
| Tabletop Simulator version | 2024 | |
| Nintendo Switch version | 8 August 2024 | |

== On-screen adaptation ==
Netflix secured exclusive global rights to create the first on-screen adaptation of the game, a deal which covered scripted and unscripted projects across film, television series, and other formats. The first project being developed under the deal is a feature film written by Ben Mekler and Chris Amick, with producers Darren Kyman (Asmodee), Eric Tannenbaum (Tannenbaum Company), Kim Tannenbaum (Tannenbaum Company), Jonathan Levine (Megamix), and Gillian Bohrer (Megamix).

== In popular culture ==
Ticket to Ride has appeared on a number of TV shows, including The Big Bang Theory, The IT Crowd, and The Blacklist. In addition, a number of celebrities are fans of the game, including Emmy Rossum, Jennifer Garner, and Wil Wheaton.

On 6 April 2024, Ticket to Ride featured in a comedy sketch on Saturday Night Live (episode 16, Season 49), involving guests Kristen Wiig and Will Forte, as well as regulars Andrew Dismukes, Ego Nwodim, Chloe Fineman, and Bowen Yang, in which a dinner party guest (Wiig) is afraid to play Ticket to Ride for fear of being "Jumanji'd" thus prompting a semantic debate about how the film and narrative of Jumanji worked, before the seemingly irrational guest's fears are realised when a train conductor (Forte) enters to Jumanji the other dinner party guests.

== See also ==
- 18xx
- Age of Steam
- Colt Express
- Railways of the World
- Railway Rivals
- TransAmerica
- Mr. Trucker
