= 2014 in games =

This page lists board and card games, wargames, miniatures games, and tabletop role-playing games published in 2014. For video games, see 2014 in video gaming.

== Games released or invented in 2014 ==
- Almirante
- Born of the Gods
- Camel Up
- Colt Express
- Dead of Winter: A Cross Roads Game
- Deus
- Eldritch Horror
- Evolution
- Five Tribes
- Future Card Buddyfight
- Golem Arcana
- Havok & Hijinks
- Hyperborea
- Imperial Settlers
- Journey into Nyx
- Khans of Tarkir
- Magic: The Gathering Conspiracy
- Onitama
- Sheriff of Nottingham
- Splendor
- Spyfall
- Star Realms
- Tide of Iron: Next Wave
- Thunderstone Advance: Worlds Collide
- Unconditional Surrender! World War 2 in Europe
- Warhammer 40,000: Conquest
- The Witcher Adventure Game
- Village: Port

== Game awards given in 2014 ==
- Spiel des Jahres: Camel Up
- Kennerspiel des Jahres: Istanbul
- Kinderspiel des Jahres: Geister, Geister, Schatzsuchmeister!
- Deutscher Spiele Preis: Russian Railroads
- Games: Garden Dice/The Card Expansion
- Nations won the Spiel Portugal Jogo do Ano.

== Significant game-related events in 2014 ==
- Days of Wonder merged with Asmodée Éditions
- Fantasy Flight Games merged with Asmodée Éditions

== Deaths ==
Date	Name	Age	Notability
February 27	Aaron Allston	53	Game designer and author
March 24	David A. Trampier	59	illustrator for Dungeons & Dragons
August 5	Scott Ciencin	51	Novelist, including Forgotten Realms
November 9	R. A. Montgomery	78	Contributor for Choose Your Own Adventure

== See also ==
- List of game manufacturers
- 2014 in video gaming
