= Almirante =

Almirante is the Spanish and Portuguese word for admiral. It may also refer to:

== Places ==
- Almirante, original name of Laurel Hill, Florida, a city in U.S.
- Almirante, Bocas del Toro, a city in Panama
- Almirante District, a district of Bocas del Toro Province in Panama
- Almirante Ice Fringe, Graham Land, Antarctica

== Other uses ==
- El Almirante, a slave ship captured by HMS Black Joke in 1829
- Almirante (board game), a Portuguese strategy board game

== See also ==
- Amirante (disambiguation)
- Almirante (surname), a surname (including a list of people with the name)
- Almirante Williams (disambiguation)
