= Hyperborea (disambiguation) =

Hyperborea was a land "beyond the North Wind" described in Greek mythology.

Hyperborea may also refer to:

== Arts ==
- Hyperborea (band), a Finnish folk music group
- Hyperborea (album), a 1983 album by Tangerine Dream
- Hyperborean cycle, a cycle of ten fantasy stories by Clark Ashton Smith
- Hyperborea (collection), a collection of Clark Ashton Smith's Hyperborean stories
- Hyperborea (game), a 2014 board game
- Hyperborea (RPG), a 2012 tabletop role-playing game
- "Hyperborea", a track by Biosphere from the 1997 album Substrata
- "Hyperborea", a track by Horse the Band from the 2007 album A Natural Death
- The Hyborian Age, the fictional setting of the stories of Conan the Barbarian

== Science ==
- 1309 Hyperborea, an asteroid
- Bidens hyperborea, a species of flowering plant in the family Asteraceae
- Hyperborea, a monotypic genus of tiger moths now classified Chelis czekanowskii
- Ochotona hyperborea, a species of pika known as the Northern pika
