= Rambali =

Rambali is a surname. Notable people with the surname include:

- Gustave Rudman Rambali, Franco-Swedish composer, arranger and producer
- Paul Rambali (1957–2024), British rock critic and writer
