= 2014 in video games =

The year 2014 saw a number of events in the video game industry. No new major consoles were released, but updates and upgrades were: the New Nintendo 3DS was released in Japan and Oceania, and Sony Interactive Entertainment released new model 2000 PS Vita systems in Europe & North America. In video game-related corporate acquisitions, Amazon purchased the online video game streaming service Twitch, and Facebook acquired the virtual reality company and product Oculus. Nintendo released Amiibo in 2014, companion figurines that could be scanned by the 3DS and Wii U systems. On Twitter and other Internet social media, the Gamergate controversy began.

Among video games originally released in 2014, critics gave the highest reviews to Super Smash Bros. for Wii U, Dark Souls II, Bayonetta 2, Shovel Knight, Velocity 2X, Dragon Age: Inquisition, Mario Kart 8, and Hearthstone: Heroes of Warcraft. Other significant games that won awards included Destiny, Middle-earth: Shadow of Mordor, Monument Valley, Grand Theft Auto Online, Call of Duty: Advanced Warfare, and Watch Dogs.

Series with new installments in 2014 include Assassin's Creed, Bayonetta, Borderlands, Call of Duty, Castlevania, Civilization, Dark Souls, Divinity, Donkey Kong, Dragon Age, The Elder Scrolls, Elite, Far Cry, Final Fantasy, Forza Horizon, Infamous, Kinect Sports, Kirby, LittleBigPlanet, Mario Golf, Mario Kart, Metal Gear, MX vs. ATV, Ninja Gaiden, Persona, Pokémon, Professor Layton, Shantae, Sniper Elite, Sonic the Hedgehog, Strider Hiryu, Super Smash Bros., Tales, The Sims, Thief, Trials, Tropico, Wolfenstein, and World of Warcraft.

In addition, 2014 saw the introduction of several new properties, including Destiny, Five Nights at Freddy's, Shovel Knight, Sunset Overdrive, Titanfall, The Evil Within and Watch Dogs.

== Highest-grossing games ==
The following were 2014's top ten highest-grossing video games in terms of worldwide revenue (including physical sales, digital purchases, subscriptions, microtransactions, free-to-play and pay-to-play) across all platforms (including mobile, PC, and console platforms).

No.	Game	Revenue	Publisher(s)	Genre(s)	Platform(s)	Business model	Ref.
1	Puzzle & Dragons	$1,500,000,000	GungHo Online Entertainment (SoftBank Group)	Puzzle	Mobile	Free-to-play	
2	Crossfire	$1,400,000,000	Smilegate / Tencent	FPS	PC	Free-to-play	
3	Candy Crush Saga	$1,330,000,000	King Digital	Puzzle	Mobile	Free-to-play	
4	Clash of Clans	$1,000,000,000	Supercell (SoftBank Group)	Strategy	Mobile	Free-to-play	
5	League of Legends	$946,000,000	Riot Games / Tencent	MOBA	PC	Free-to-play	
6	Dungeon Fighter Online	$891,000,000	Neople / Nexon	Beat 'em up	PC	Free-to-play	
7	Call of Duty: Advanced Warfare	$840,000,000	Activision (Activision Blizzard)	FPS	PC, Console	Buy-to-play	
8	Grand Theft Auto V	$750,000,000	Rockstar Games (Take-Two Interactive)	Action-adventure	PC, Console	Buy-to-play	
9	World of Warcraft	$728,000,000	Blizzard Entertainment (Activision Blizzard)	MMORPG	PC	Subscription	
10	Destiny	$500,000,000	Activision (Activision Blizzard)	FPS	Console	Buy-to-play	

== Top-rated games ==
=== Critically acclaimed titles ===
Metacritic (MC) and GameRankings (GR) are aggregators of video game journalism reviews.

2014 games and expansions scoring at least 90/100 (MC) or 90% (GR)
Game	Publisher	Release date	Platform	MC score	GR score
Grand Theft Auto V	Rockstar Games	November 18, 2014	XBO	97/100	98.33%
Grand Theft Auto V	Rockstar Games	November 18, 2014	PS4	97/100	96.33%
The Last of Us Remastered	Sony Computer Entertainment	July 29, 2014	PS4	95/100	95.7%
Shovel Knight	Yacht Club Games	June 26, 2014	3DS	90/100	93.67%
Fez	Trapdoor	March 25, 2014	PSV	91/100	92.5%
Super Smash Bros. for Wii U	Nintendo	November 21, 2014	WiiU	92/100	92.39%
Rayman Legends	Ubisoft	February 18, 2014	XBO	91/100	92.17%
Bayonetta 2	Nintendo	September 20, 2014	WiiU	91/100	91.38%
Diablo III: Ultimate Evil Edition	Blizzard Entertainment	August 19, 2014	PS4	90/100	91.25%
Dark Souls II	Bandai Namco Games	March 11, 2014	PS3	91/100	89.68%
Kentucky Route Zero – Act III	Cardboard Computer	May 6, 2014	WIN	91/100	89%
Dark Souls II	Bandai Namco Games	March 11, 2014	X360	91/100	88.95%
Dark Souls II	Bandai Namco Games	March 11, 2014	WIN	91/100	88.3%
Out of the Park Baseball 15	Out of the Park Developments	April 24, 2014	WIN	89/100	90.71%
Velocity 2X	FuturLab	September 2, 2014	PSV	90/100	90.56%
Rayman Legends	Ubisoft	February 18, 2014	PS4	90/100	90.45%
Metro Redux	Deep Silver	August 25, 2014	WIN	90/100	90.2%
The Binding of Isaac: Rebirth	Nicalis	November 4, 2014	WIN	86/100	90.2%
Child of Light	Ubisoft	April 29, 2014	PS3	89/100	90%
Guacamelee! Super Turbo Championship Edition	DrinkBox Studios	July 2, 2014	WiiU	90/100	88.86%
Fez	Trapdoor	March 25, 2014	PS4	90/100	88.46%
The Legend of Heroes: Trails of Cold Steel II	Nihon Falcom	September 25, 2014	PS3	90/100	87.5%

=== Major awards ===
Category/Organization		32nd Golden Joystick Awards October 24, 2014	The Game Awards 2014 December 5, 2014	18th Annual D.I.C.E. Awards February 5, 2015	15th Game Developers Choice Awards March 3, 2015	11th British Academy Games Awards March 12, 2015
Game of the Year		Dark Souls II	Dragon Age: Inquisition		Middle-earth: Shadow of Mordor	Destiny
Independent / Debut (Note: Certain award presentations combine these categories.)		DayZ	Shovel Knight	Transistor	The Banner Saga	Never Alone
Mobile/Handheld	Mobile	Hearthstone: Heroes of Warcraft	Hearthstone: Heroes of Warcraft	Hearthstone: Heroes of Warcraft	Monument Valley	
Mobile/Handheld	Handheld	Pokémon X and Y	Hearthstone: Heroes of Warcraft	Super Smash Bros. for Nintendo 3DS	Monument Valley	
Innovation		Oculus Rift DK2	—N/a	Middle-earth: Shadow of Mordor	Monument Valley	The Vanishing of Ethan Carter
Artistic Achievement	Animation	Assassin's Creed IV: Black Flag	—N/a	Middle-earth: Shadow of Mordor	Monument Valley	Lumino City
Artistic Achievement	Art Direction	Assassin's Creed IV: Black Flag	—N/a	Monument Valley	Monument Valley	Lumino City
Audio	Music	Assassin's Creed IV: Black Flag	Destiny		Alien: Isolation	Far Cry 4
Audio	Sound Design	Assassin's Creed IV: Black Flag	—N/a	Destiny	Alien: Isolation	Alien: Isolation
Character or Performance		—N/a	Trey Parker as multiple characters South Park: The Stick of Truth	Talion; Middle-earth: Shadow of Mordor	—N/a	Ashley Johnson as Ellie; The Last of Us: Left Behind
Game Design or Direction	Game Design	—N/a		Middle-earth: Shadow of Mordor	Hearthstone: Heroes of Warcraft	Middle-earth: Shadow of Mordor
Game Design or Direction	Game Direction	—N/a		Middle-earth: Shadow of Mordor	Hearthstone: Heroes of Warcraft	Middle-earth: Shadow of Mordor
Narrative		The Last of Us: Left Behind	Valiant Hearts: The Great War	Middle-earth: Shadow of Mordor	Kentucky Route Zero: Episode 3	The Last of Us: Left Behind
Technical Achievement		—N/a		Middle-earth: Shadow of Mordor	Destiny	—N/a
Multiplayer/Online		Battlefield 4	Destiny		—N/a	Hearthstone: Heroes of Warcraft
Action/Shooter		—N/a	Far Cry 4	Destiny	—N/a	
Adventure		—N/a	Middle-earth: Shadow of Mordor		—N/a	
Family		—N/a	Mario Kart 8	LittleBigPlanet 3	—N/a	Minecraft: Console Editions
Fighting		—N/a	Super Smash Bros. for Wii U		—N/a	
Role-Playing		—N/a	Dragon Age: Inquisition		—N/a	
Sports/Racing	Sports	—N/a	Mario Kart 8	FIFA 15	—N/a	OlliOlli
Sports/Racing	Racing	—N/a	Mario Kart 8	Mario Kart 8	—N/a	OlliOlli
Strategy/Simulation		—N/a		Hearthstone: Heroes of Warcraft	—N/a	
Special Award		Lifetime Achievement	Industry Icon Award	Pioneer Awards	Lifetime Achievement Award	BAFTA Fellowship
Special Award		Hideo Kojima	Ken and Roberta Williams	Allan Alcorn, Ralph H. Baer	Hironobu Sakaguchi	David Braben

== Major events ==
Date	Event	Ref.
January	Atari emerges from Bankruptcy and plans to enter the Social Casino market.	
January 6	2K Games discontinued the MLB 2K series.	
January 7	PlayStation Now, a cloud-streaming from Sony Computer Entertainment was announced.	
January 15–16	Steam Dev Days held in Seattle, Washington.	
January 27	Microsoft acquired the Gears of War franchise from Epic Games.	
February 5	Double Helix Games was acquired by Amazon.com	
February 18	Irrational Games, the creator of the BioShock series was shut down.	
March 12	10th British Academy Video Games Awards held in Tobacco Dock, London.	
March 17 – 21	Game Developers Conference 2014 held in San Francisco, California.	
March 18	Project Morpheus, a virtual reality initiative from Sony Computer Entertainment for the PlayStation 4 is announced.	
March 25	Oculus VR was acquired by Facebook for $2 billion.	
March 28 – 30	Rezzed 2014 held at the NEC Birmingham.	
April 11 – 13	PAX East 2014 held at the Boston Convention and Exhibition Center.	
April 12 – 13	Midwest Gaming Classic 2014 held at the Sheraton Milwaukee Brookfield Hotel in Brookfield, Wisconsin.	
May 20	Nintendo discontinues the Nintendo Wi-Fi Connection servers for Wii and Nintendo DS games.	
May 29	Electronic Arts shut down Mythic Entertainment	
June 5	Nintendo announces that their president, Satoru Iwata won't attend E3 due to medical issues.	
June 10 – 12	E3 2014 held at the Los Angeles Convention Center.	
June 12	Nordic Games acquired the publishing label of THQ.	
June 14 – 17	DreamHack-Summer held in Jönköping, Sweden.	
June 25	Google releases the Google Cardboard a VR accessory designed for smartphones.	
June 30	Crytek's IP's Homefront: The Revolution was acquired by Koch Media. Crytek UK, formerly Free Radical Design, and Crytek USA was shut down.	
June 30	Deep Silver set up a new subsidiary known as Deep Silver Dambuster.	
June 30	Electronic Arts shut down more than 50 multiplayer games.	
July 10	Tony Hawk's Pro Skater's creator Neversoft was merged into Infinity Ward by Activision.	
July 17 – 20	QuakeCon 2014: The massive annual LAN party held in Dallas, Texas.	
July 24 – 27	SDCC 2014 held at the San Diego Convention Center.	
July 29	The Nvidia Shield Tablet is released in North America.	
July	Airtight Games was shut down approximately one month after the release of Murdered: Soul Suspect.	
August 7	Activision revived the brand of Sierra Entertainment.	
August 11	Electronic Arts launched a subscription video game service called EA Access for the Xbox One.	
August 13 – 17	Gamescom 2014 held in Cologne, Germany.	
August 20 – 22	Unite 2014 held in Seattle, Washington.	
August 25	Twitch was acquired by Amazon.com for $970 million.	
August 28	The Gamergate controversy came to public attention due to the introduction of the GamerGate hashtag.	
August 29	Nintendo announced the New Nintendo 3DS XL.	
August 29 – September 1	PAX Prime 2014 held at the Washington State Convention Center.	
September 18 – 21	Tokyo Game Show 2014 at the Makuhari Messe in Tokyo.	
September 25 – 28	EGX London 2014 held in Earls Court, London.	
September 27	Naughty Dog celebrated its 30th anniversary.	
October 2 – 5	GIGACON 2014 held in Telenor Arena, Oslo, Norway.	
October 3 – 5	EGS 2014 held in Centro Banamex, Mexico City, Mexico.	
October 6	Ubisoft Reflections, formerly known as Reflections Interactive, celebrated its 30th anniversary.	
October 11 – 12	Play Expo 2014 held at EventCity, Manchester.	
October 11 – 12	FirstLook 2014 held at Jaarbeurs in Utrecht, the Netherlands.	
October 19	2014 League of Legends World Championship was held at the Seoul World Cup Stadium	
October 24	32nd Golden Joystick Awards was held	
October 24–26	Milan Games Week held at Fieramilanocity in Milan, Italy.	
October 31 – November 2	PAX Australia 2014 held at the Melbourne Exhibition Centre in Melbourne, Australia.	
November 6	Microsoft Studios acquired Minecraft developer Mojang for $2.5 billion.	
November 7 – 8	BlizzCon 2014 held at the Anaheim Convention Center in Anaheim, California.	
November 12–17	E-Sports World Championship 2014 was held in Baku, Azerbaijan	
November 27 – 30	DreamHack-Winter held in Jönköping, Sweden.	
December 4	2K Games announced a new subsidiary called Hangar 13.	
December 5	The Game Awards 2014 held in Las Vegas.	
December 6 – 7	PlayStation Experience held at The Venetian Las Vegas in Las Vegas, Nevada.	

== Notable deaths ==
- January 23 – Justin Carmical, 42, retro game enthusiast known online as JewWario.
- February 14 – Harold Ramis, 69, actor, writer, and director who created the Ghostbusters franchise and co-wrote the 2009 video game.
- April 19 – Bob Hoskins, 71, actor who played Mario in 1993's Super Mario Bros..
- April 8 – The Ultimate Warrior, 54, pro wrestler who appeared in WWE games (cover star of WWF WrestleMania Challenge, WWF European Rampage Tour, WWF Superstars, and WWE All Stars).
- August 11 – Robin Williams, 63, actor who appeared in ads for The Legend of Zelda alongside his daughter whose name originates from the series.
- December 6 – Ralph H. Baer, 92, game designer credited for creating the first home console.
- December 22 – Christine Cavanaugh, 51, voice actor best known for the voice of Chuckie in the Rugrats franchise.

== Hardware releases ==
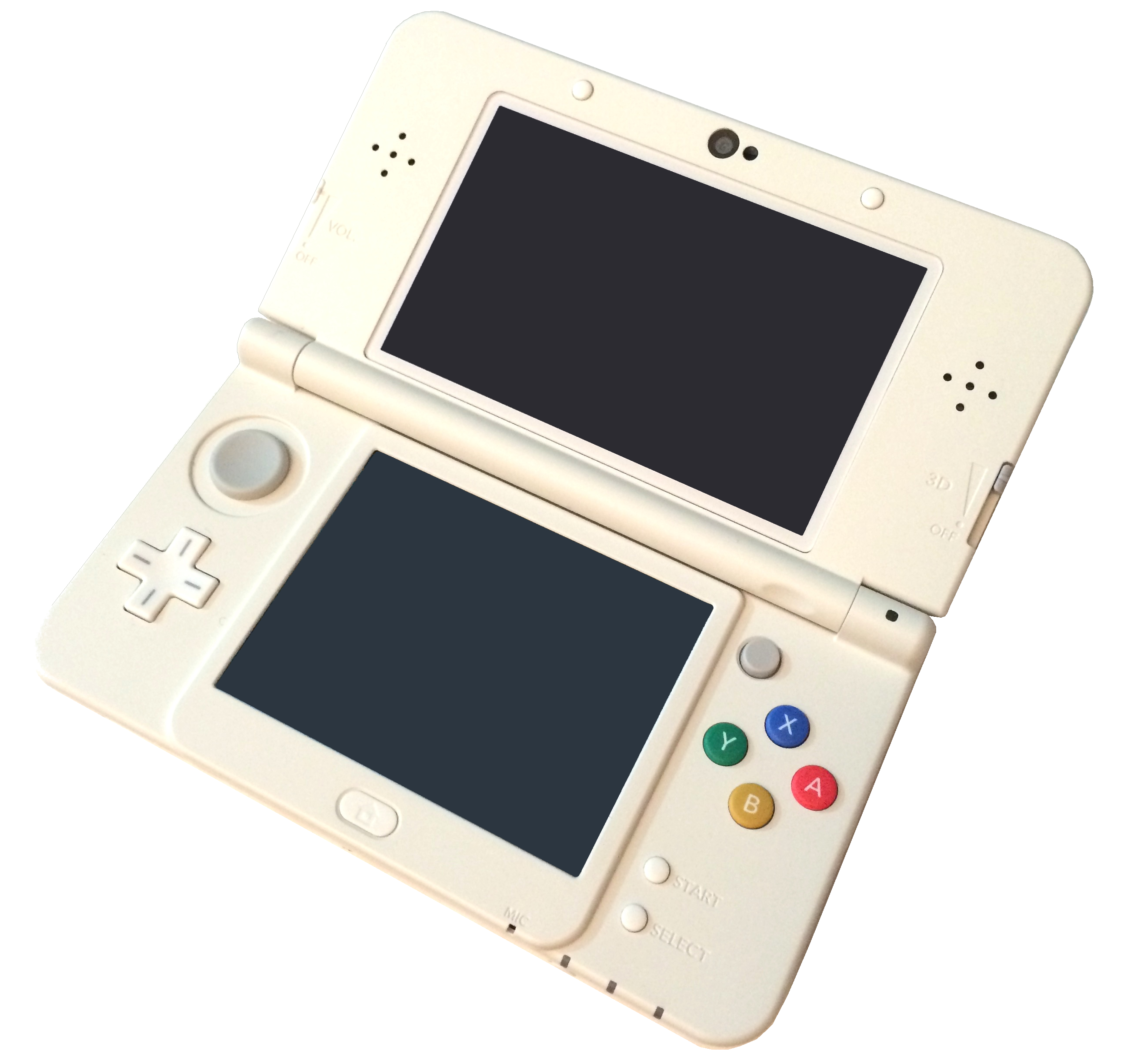
New Nintendo 3DS

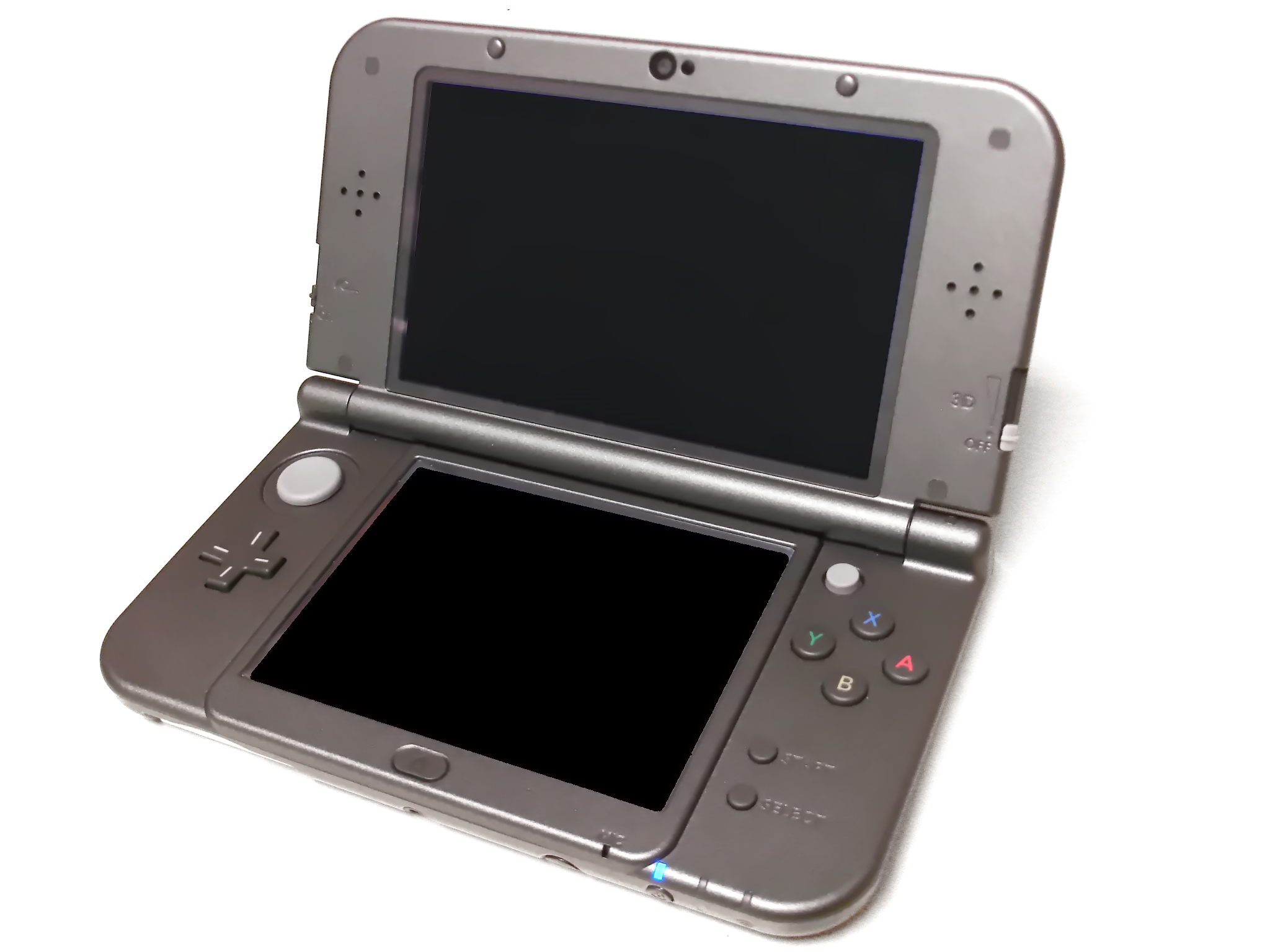
New Nintendo 3DS XL

The following is a list of game consoles released in 2014.

The PlayStation 4 and Xbox One made their launch releases in Asian countries.

Nintendo released their newest revision models of the Nintendo 3DS this year, the New Nintendo 3DS and the New Nintendo 3DS XL. (Note: Named "New Nintendo 3DS LL" in Japan.) The New Nintendo 3DS' included brand new features like better 3D viewing, a C-stick for enhanced camera controls, 2 extra shoulder buttons named ZL & ZR, and a built in NFC reader for Amiibo figures.

Date	Console	Manufacturer	Ref.
February 22	PlayStation 4^{JP}	Sony	
September 4	Xbox One^{JP}	Microsoft	
September 29	Xbox One^{CHN}	Microsoft	
October 11	New Nintendo 3DS^{JP}	Nintendo	
October 11	New Nintendo 3DS XL^{JP}	Nintendo	
November 21	New Nintendo 3DS^{AU}	Nintendo	
November 21	New Nintendo 3DS XL^{AU}	Nintendo	

== Video game-based film and television releases ==
Title	Date	Type	Distributor(s)	Franchise	Original game publisher(s)	Ref.
D-Frag!	January 6, 2014	Anime television series	TV Tokyo (Japan)	—N/a	—N/a	
Need for Speed	March 14, 2014	Feature film	Walt Disney Studios Motion Pictures	Need for Speed	Electronic Arts	
Free to Play	March 19, 2014	Documentary film	Valve	Dota	Valve	
No Game No Life	April 9, 2014	Anime television series	Tokyo MX (Japan)	—N/a	—N/a	
Piggy Tales	April 17, 2014	Animated television series	Toons.TV	Angry Birds	Rovio Entertainment	
Street Fighter: Assassin's Fist	May 23, 2014	Web series	Machinima	Street Fighter	Capcom	
Persona 3 The Movie: No. 2, Midsummer Knight's Dream	June 7, 2014	Anime film	Aniplex	Persona	Atlus	
Video Games: The Movie	July 15, 2014	Documentary film	Variance Films	—N/a	—N/a	
Diancie and the Cocoon of Destruction	July 19, 2014	Anime film	Toho (Japan)	Pokémon	Nintendo; The Pokémon Company	
Angry Video Game Nerd: The Movie	July 21, 2014	Independent film	Screenwave Media (DVD/Blu-ray); Indie Rights (VOD)	Angry Video Game Nerd	—N/a	
Tekken 2: Kazuya's Revenge	August 6, 2014	Martial arts film	SP Distribution	Tekken	Bandai Namco Entertainment	
Heavenly Sword	September 2, 2014	CGI animated film	TriCoast Worldwide	Heavenly Sword	Ninja Theory	
Sonic Boom	November 8, 2014	CGI animated television series	Lagardère Entertainment Rights; M6 Group	Sonic the Hedgehog	Sega	
Atari: Game Over	November 20, 2014	Documentary film	Microsoft Movies & TV	—N/a	Atari	

== See also ==
- 2014 in esports
- 2014 in games
- Counter-Strike match fixing scandal
