= Zizzi (disambiguation) =

Zizzi is a chain of restaurants in Ireland and the United Kingdom.

Zizzi is also a surname. Notable people with the surname include:

- Colin Zizzi (born 1988), Armenian footballer
- Pierluca Zizzi (born 1970), Italian board game designer
