= Cryptozoic Entertainment =

American games and collectibles publisher

Cryptozoic Entertainment, LLC
- Type: Private
- Industry: Entertainment
- Founded: March 2010; 16 years ago in Irvine, California
- Headquarters: 23212 Mill Creek Dr. Suite 300, Laguna Hills, California, United States
- Area served: Worldwide
- Key people: Cory Jones (President and CCO); John Nee (CO-CEO); John Sepenuk (CO-CEO); Bill Schanes(COO); Scott Gaeta (Founder)
- Products: Art toys; Board and card games; Trading cards
- Website: cryptozoic.com

Cryptozoic Entertainment is an American publisher of board and card games, trading cards and collectibles based on both licensed and original intellectual properties. The company is well known for its "Cerberus Engine Game", the catch name for its series of deck-building games. Cryptozoic's first game was based on DC Comics characters, having been released in 2012. The Cerberus engine is utilized in various games; all Cerberus games are compatible with each other, allowing gamers to intermix different decks and characters from different universes.

Cryptozoic Entertainment has also produced products based on The Lord of the Rings, Attack on Titan, Ghostbusters, AMC's The Walking Dead, Portal, Rick and Morty, various Cartoon Network series such as Adventure Time, DC Comics characters and other IPs.

== History ==
Founded in March 2010, Cryptozoic's first product was the World of Warcraft Trading Card Game expansion Wrathgate, released in May 2010. Cryptozoic produced 12 sets for the World of Warcraft Trading Card Game. The last set, Timewalkers: Reign of Fire, was released in July 2013.

Cryptozoic Entertainment expanded its product line-up with numerous tabletop games beginning in 2011. The DC Comics Deck-Building Game franchise represents its best-selling series of products to date, with 12 standalone base games and 14 expansions, as well as numerous promo cards. Other popular titles include Epic Spell Wars of the Battle Wizards: Duel at Mt. Skullzfyre, Ghostbusters: The Board Game, Spyfall, and Portal: The Uncooperative Cake Acquisition Game.

Trading cards were also added to Cryptozoic Entertainment's catalog in 2011 with the launch of the Comic Book Legal Defense Fund Liberty Trading Card Set. Since then, Cryptozoic has released over 50 different trading card sets featuring properties such as DC Comics, The Flash, Gotham, The Hobbit, The Big Bang Theory, Ghostbusters, Breaking Bad, Downton Abbey and Outlander. These trading card sets have signatures from well-known actors, including Harrison Ford, Norman Reedus, Evangeline Lilly, Dan Aykroyd, Leonard Nimoy, and Tatiana Maslany.

In 2016, a third product category was added to Cryptozoic Entertainment's slate of offerings: collectibles. Products featuring Ghostbusters, DC Comics, and Cartoon Books characters were first made available at San Diego Comic-Con 2016. The company's collectibles include DC Comics Lil’ Bombshells, Ghostbusters Micro Figures, the Fone Bone Vinyl Figure, Mighty Meeples, and many others.

== Licensed products ==
The list includes licensed games and collectibles by Cryptozoic:

=== Board games ===
- The Arrival (Note: Credited as "by Martin Wallace".) (2018)
- Attack on Titan: The Last Stand (2017)
- Batman: Arkham City Escape (2013)
- Batman Fluxx (2015)
- Batman: Love Letter (2015)
- Cult: Choose Your God Wisely (2018)
- Giant Killer Robots: Heavy Hitters (2018)
- Ghostbusters (2015)
- Ghostbusters II (2017)
- Internal Affairs (2016)
- Master of Orion (2017)
- Pantone: The Game (2018)
- Poker Assault (2016)
- Rick and Morty: The Ricks Must Be Crazy (2018)
- Rick and Morty: Anatomy Park (2017)
- Train Heist (Note: Illustrated game.) (2017)
- The Walking Dead (Note: Two different versions of TWD were released, a board game in 2011 and a card game in 2013.) (2011)
- The Walking Dead: No Sanctuary (2018)
- The Walking Dead: The Best Defense (2014)
- The Walking Dead: Don't Look Back
- The Walking Dead: No Sanctuary
- Wallet (2018)

=== Card games ===
- Adventure Time: Card Wars (2016)
- Adventure Time: Love Letter (2015)
- Challenge of the Superfriends (2019)
- Epic Spell Wars of the Battle Wizards (2017)
- Million Dollars, But... (2018)
- Rick and Morty: Total Rickall (2016)
- Rick and Morty: Look Who's Purging Now (2019)
- Spyfall: Time Travel (2014)
- Spyfall 2 (2017)
- Steven Universe: Beach-a-Palooza (2020)
- Walking Dead (2013)

=== Deck-building games ===
- Attack on Titan (2016)
- Batman: The Animated Series (2017)
- Capcom Street Fighter Deck-building Game (2014)
- Cartoon Network Crossover Crisis (2016)
- Crisis Expansion Packs 1–3 (2014–16)
- DC Comics (2012) (Note: Cryptozoic also launched several "crossover packs" for this game, they are: New Gods, The Rogues, Watchmen, Legion of Super-Heroes, Batman Ninja, Birds of Prey and * Arrow The Television Series.)
- DC Comics: Confrontations (2017)
- DC Comics: Dark Nights - Metal (2020)
- DC Rebirth (2019)
- DC Spyfall (2018)
- DC Heroes Unite (2014)
- Forever Evil (2014)
- The Hobbit Deck-building game (2014)
- The Hobbit The Desolation of Smaug Expansion (2015)
- Justice Society of America (2015)
- The Lord of the Rings The Fellowship of the Ring (2013)
- The Lord of the Rings The Two Towers (2013)
- The Lord of the Rings The Return of the King (2014)
- Naruto Shippuden Deck-building Game (2014)
- Multiverse (2017)
- Rick and Morty: Close Rick (2017)
- Rick and Morty: The Rickshank Rickdemption (2018)
- Rivals – Batman vs The Joker (2014)
- Rivals – Green Lantern vs Sinestro (2018)
- Teen Titans (2015)
- Teen Titans Go! (2017)

=== Trading cards ===
- Alphas (2013)
- Archer, Seasons 1-4 (2014)
- Arrow (2015)
- Batman: The Legend (2013)
- Big Bang Theory, Seasons 1-7 (2012–16)
- Breaking Bad, Seasons 1-5 (2014)
- Castle, Seasons 1-4 (2013–14)
- DC Comics Epic Battles (2014)
- DC Bombshells Series 1-3 (2017–19)
- DC's The Women of Legend (2013)
- Downton Abbey, Seasons 1-2 (2014)
- Ender's Game (2014)
- Flash (2016)
- Fringe, Seasons 1-5 (2012–16)
- Ghostbusters (2016)
- Gotham, Seasons 1-2 (2016–17)
- Guild, Seasons 1-3 (2011)
- The Hobbit: An Unexpected Journey (2014)
- The Hobbit: The Desolation of Smaug (2015)
- The Hobbit: The Battle of the Five Armies (2016)
- Justice League (2016)
- Legends of Tomorrow Seasons 1–2 (2018)
- New 52 (2012)
- Once Upon a Time (2014)
- Orphan Black, Seasons 1-3 (2016–17)
- Outlander, Seasons 1-2 (2019)
- Pacific Rim (2014)
- Psych, Seasons 1-8 (2013–15)
- Revenge (2013)
- Rick and Morty, Seasons 1–3 (2018)
- Sleepy Hollow (2015)
- Smallville, Seasons 7-10 (2012)
- Sons of Anarchy, Seasons 1-7 (2014–15)
- Supergirl (2018)
- Superman: The Legend (2013)
- Supernatural, Seasons 1-6 (2014–16)
- Tarzan 100th. Anniversary (Note: Illustrated cards.) (2012)
- Vampire Diaries Seasons 1–4 (2012–16)
- Walking Dead Seasons 1–4 (2011–16)
- Walking Dead Comic Book (2013)

=== Other collectibles ===
==== Statues ====
- Cryptkins (2018)
- DC Bombshells, Series 1-3 (2016–18)
- DC Lil Bombshells (2018)
- DC Mighty Meeples (2017)
- DC Mighty Meeples - Hall of Justice (2017)
- DC Teekeez (Note: Consists of 2,625" vinyl figures, featuring Batman, Superman, Wonder Woman, The Joker, and Harley Quinn.) (2017)
- Fone Bone (2016)
- Freddy Krueger (2019)
- Ghostbusters Stay-Puft Marshmallow Man (2016)
- Ghostbusters Micro figures (2016)
- Harley Quinn (2018)
- Harley Quinn Mugshot bust (2017)
- Harley Quinn Hula Girl (2016)
- Lynda Carter as Wonder Woman (2018)
- Outlander: Jamie Fraser (2018)
- Spell Wars of the Battle Wizards ()
- Street Fighter Knockouts (2017)
- Superman Rescues Lois Lane (Note: Based on the Superman (1940s cartoons).) (2016)
- Wonder Woman: Princess of Themiscira (2019)
- Wonder Woman Movie (2019)

==== Other sculptures ====
- DC Pumps (Note: Consists of DC's heroes and villains mini-shoes (2,5"), including Wonder Woman, Harley Quinn, Supergirl, and Batgirl.)
- Harley Quinn bottle opener (2016)
