= Berserk (card game) =

Collectible card game

- Card Game
- The back of a Berserk card
- Designer: Ivan Popov, Maksim Istomin
- Publisher: Hobby World
- Release date: November 1, 2003; 22 years ago (original); April 14, 2023; 3 years ago (relaunch)
- Type: Collectible
- Players: 2
- Age range: 12+
- Cards: 30 to 50
- Playing time: 40-60 minutes
- Chance: Moderate (order of cards drawn, dice rolls)
- Website: berserk.ru

Berserk (Note: Russian: Берсерк) is a collectible card game developed and published by Hobby World. It was originally released in 2003, and ran until its closure in 2015. It was relaunched in 2023 with updated rules and design. The game takes place in a fantasy world of Laar, and features many fantastic creatures and characters.

== Gameplay ==
=== Setup ===
In Berserk players take on the roles of duelling wizards, called "Ungars". In order to play, both players require a deck of 30 to 50 cards, which must have no more than 3 of the same card. The players then roll the dice and the winner decides who will act first.

Players shuffle their decks, and take 15 cards from them. Then they hire cards from their hand by deducting the cards' price from their pool of gold and silver crystals. Initially, the first player has 24 gold and 22 silver crystals, and the second player has 1 more of each - 25 gold and 23 silver. Players are also issued a penalty of 1 gold crystal for every element in their army past the first one. Additionally, player may declare any amount of mulligans for an additional penalty of 1 gold crystal each.

After hiring their armies, players lay them on their half of the battlefield face-down. The battlefield is a rectangular grid consisting of 6 rows and 5 columns, for the total of 30 cells, with the three rows closest to a player designated as their half. The first player can place their cards only into the central 3x3 square, while the second player can also take the remaining two cells of their first (closet to the enemy) row. If the player still has cards left, they can place them into remaining cells of the third and then second row. All cards are considered either "elite" or "regular", denoted by the color of the price field. Elite cards can be bought only with gold crystals, while regular ones can use either type.

=== Battle ===
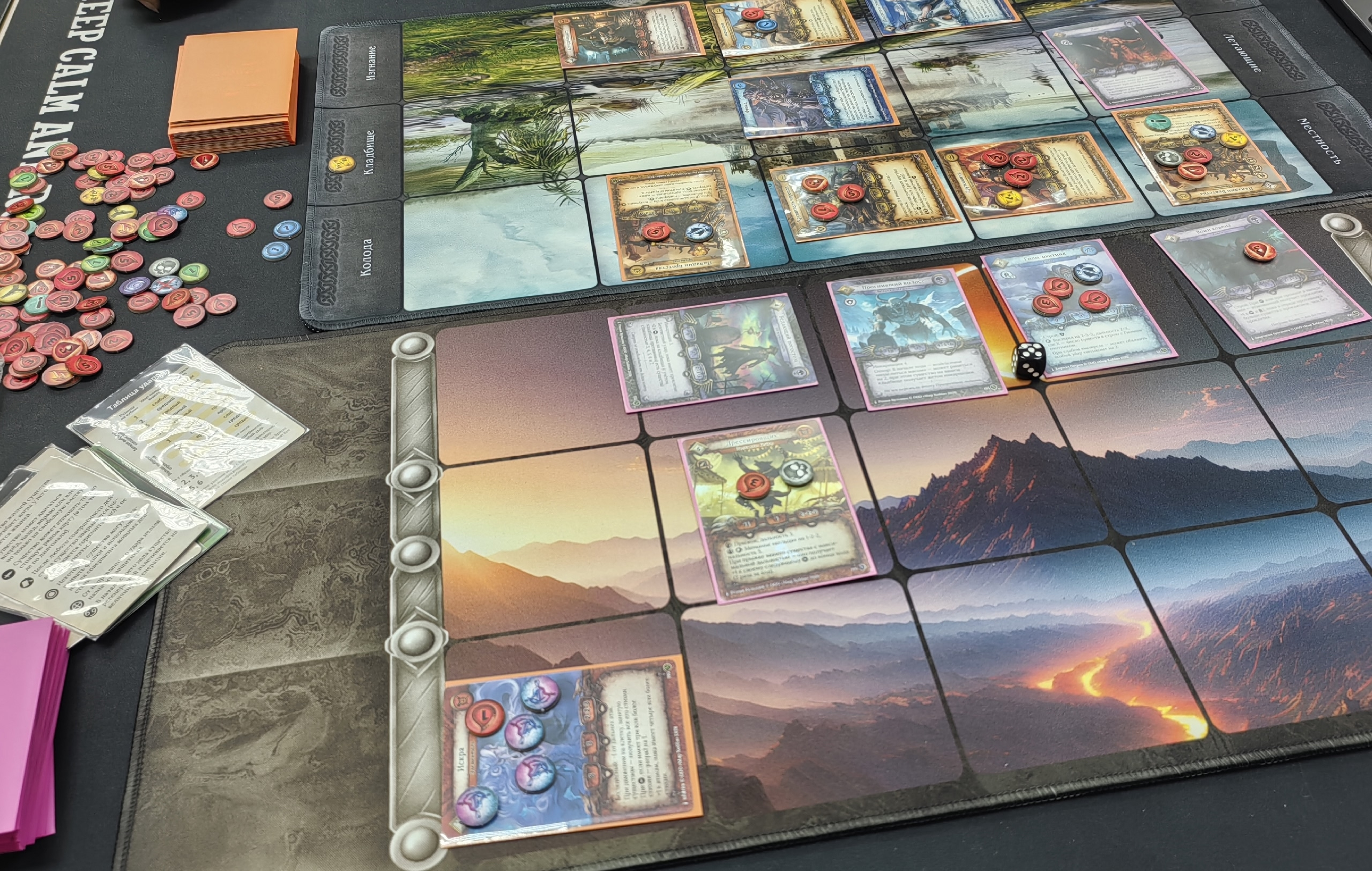
A game of Berserk in progress

The objective of the game is to destroy the opponent's army by destroying all of their creatures. To do this, players can use their cards' basic strikes and special abilities.

Attacking with a basic strike is only possible on an adjacent target, and requires both players to roll dice, with the outcome depending on who rolled a higher number, and the difference between them. The attacker is then "exhausted", and the card is turned sideways to show it can no longer act or move this turn. When a card can't fight back, whether due to being exhausted or to the properties of the attack, only the attacker rolls the dice. However, it's possible to defend a card from a basic strike by selecting a protector - a non-exhausted ("alert") card that's adjacent to both the attacker and the card being protected. Dealt wounds are then marked with tokens, while exhausted creatures become alert again at the start of their owner's turn.

Aside from the basic attack, many creatures possess special abilities, such as archers being able to shoot from afar. Using some abilities often causes the card to become exhausted, while others activate automatically on certain conditions. Some abilities work only on cards with a certain Class, which represents the creature's race or allegiance.

=== Cards ===
Most cards in the game represent fantasy creatures, and possess three basic parameters - life, movement, and basic strike. The basic strike is written in the X-Y-Z format, from weak to strong. Life means how many wounds the card can take before being destroyed. Movement means how many cells the card can move in a single turn. Certain card types replace it with various symbols, such as wings (for flying creatures) or a spider (for symbionts). The top-left corner depicts a diamond-shaped crystal, colored either white (for silver) or yellow (for gold).

The main text field describes the card's special abilities, often making use of keywords and pictograms, and may contain flavor text. The lower line contains technical information - the card artist, date of production, card number, set symbol, and rarity of the card (as color of the set symbol).

== Development ==
Berserk originated in 1996, when Maksim Istomin returned from a trip the United States with several cards of Magic: The Gathering, and shown them to his friend Ivan Popov. Not knowing the rules, the two were nevertheless inspired be the artworks and the general idea of card games, and started drawing their own cards in imitation. After some time, Istomin came up with the basic rules for the game, which were then further refined by both of them. The name "Berserk" was also chosen during this time.

After graduating, the friends went their separate ways, but by 2003, once again looking at the success of Magic: The Gathering, which by then has already reached Russia, decided to self-publish Berserk. In summer 2003 they founded the "Fantasy World" company, and started preparing the game for release. Aiming to broaden their audience, Istomin and Popov reached out to the popular writer Nick Perumov, who edited the game's lore and gave a permission to use his name on the boxes free of charge. The game was launched in November 2003, becoming the first Russian CCG to reach the market.

In 2010 the design of the game's cards was updated. However, the card back wasn't changed and old cards remained legal. By 2011 the game had 16 sets and over 4000 unique cards.

In October 2015 Berserk was cancelled and succeeded by a different game, called Berserk: Heroes. No new full-size sets were released during this period, but the "classic" Berserk was supported by boxed sets.

In 2023 the game was rebooted. The reboot retains most of the original's mechanics, and many of the old cards have been reprinted with slightly updated design. However, the card back has been changed, and the game in incompatible with old cards. By March 2026 the rebooted version had 7 sets and over 1400 cards.

== Production ==
Berserk cards are of the same size as many other CCGs, approximately 63 × 88 mm. They are primarily sold in booster packs of 12 cards, or in booster displays of 24 boosters each. Another format of release is in starter decks, containing 30 predetermined cards of a certain theme.

The majority of the game's cards is grouped into sets. Sets are usually released bi-annually, and, as of 2026, number 220 cards each. Additionally, certain cards are available only in special boxed sets. Those cards are usually illegal in organized play.

As of March 2026, the game has 7 sets:

- War of the Elements (200 cards, released 14 April 2023)
- Invasion of Darkness (200 cards, released 8 September 2023)
- Seeds of Strife (195 cards, released 15 March 2024)
- False Gods (220 cards, released 6 September 2024)
- Path of the Keepers (220 cards, released 20 March 2025)
- Ghost Legion (220 cards, released 5 September 2025)
- Death of the Gods (220 cards, released 6 March 2026)

== Marketing ==
In 2004, Berserk launched an advertisement campaign in the Mir Fantastiki magazine, with several issues, starting with December 2004, containing promotional cards. This practice was restored after the game's reboot. Berserk card art also serves as cover for issues released the same month as the new set.

An English-language release of one of the game's boxed sets, Berserk: War of the Realms, was successfully funded through Kickstarter in 2013, and released later the same year.

In 2024 the game celebrated its 20th anniversary, and its publisher declared 2024 "the year of Berserk". As a part of the celebration, Hobby World held a fan convention called "Berserk Con 2024", which became an annual event.

== Reception ==
Within the first month Berserk made back only $500 of its $30000 starting capital. However, the collaboration with Nick Perumov and a public tournament held in a popular club helped to promote the game. By 2005 it was sold by over 300 stores and game clubs, and made over $5000 per month.

In 2011 Popov estimated that on the game's peak of popularity in 2008-2009 it had over 40000 active players.

Reviewers compared Berserk to board wargames, and praised the card illustrations, but noted the game's significant usage of dice rolls, believing they may turn off some fans of traditional CCGs.

== Franchise ==
Besides the main card game, the franchise also includes several board games. The first of them, Berserk-opoly, is a Monopoly clone, released in 2008. The creators later said they didn't like it, feeling it damages the brand. However, it was followed by board games Viceroy and Bastion, also set in Berserk's world, released in 2014 and 2015 respectively. Viceroy would also receive an expansion called Times of Darkness in 2018.

Another spin-off game, Berserk: Heroes, is a collectible card game that succeeded regular Berserk after its cancelation in 2015. It's been likened to Hearthstone in its gameplay. As of 2023 the game has 14 sets.

Berserk has a series of four novels, published in 2008–2009. The series was cancelled due to low sales.

The game was also adapted into a series of browser games, the first of which was published in 2004 by Mail.ru.
