= Naast (disambiguation) =

Naast is a French band.

Naast may also refer to:

- Naast, Ross and Cromarty, a place in Highland, Scotland
- Naast, Soignies, a district of the municipality of Soignies, Wallonia in Belgium
