= Igromania =

Russian video game website

- Editor-in-chief: Yevgeny Peklo
- Categories: Video games
- Frequency: Monthly
- Publisher: 1997–April 2003 – Igromania-M (Игромания-M); May 2003–September 2013 – TekhnoMir (ТехноМир); October 2013–current – Igromedia (Игромедиа)
- Total circulation: ~190,000 (2009)
- Founded: 1997
- First issue: September 1997
- Final issue Number: December 2018; 255
- Country: Russian Federation
- Based in: Moscow
- Language: Russian
- Website: Igromania
- ISSN: 1560-2583

Igromania (Russian: Игромания, Russian for "Game Mania") is a Russian video game website and formerly a magazine. The magazine was published in Moscow and distributed in Russia and the CIS countries. It was founded in September 1997. The circulation in June 2009 was 190,000 copies (the largest in Europe). Each issue contained 208 pages. The magazine was accompanied by a poster, four stickers, and two DVDs.

In its early years, Igromania focused mainly on solutions and guides to video games, gradually enlarging the variety of content topics and finally moving solutions and guides to the accompanying CD and later DVD. Igromania operates a popular website and a network of YouTube and Twitch channels. From 2019, Igromania ceased printed publications and continued as an online media.

== History ==
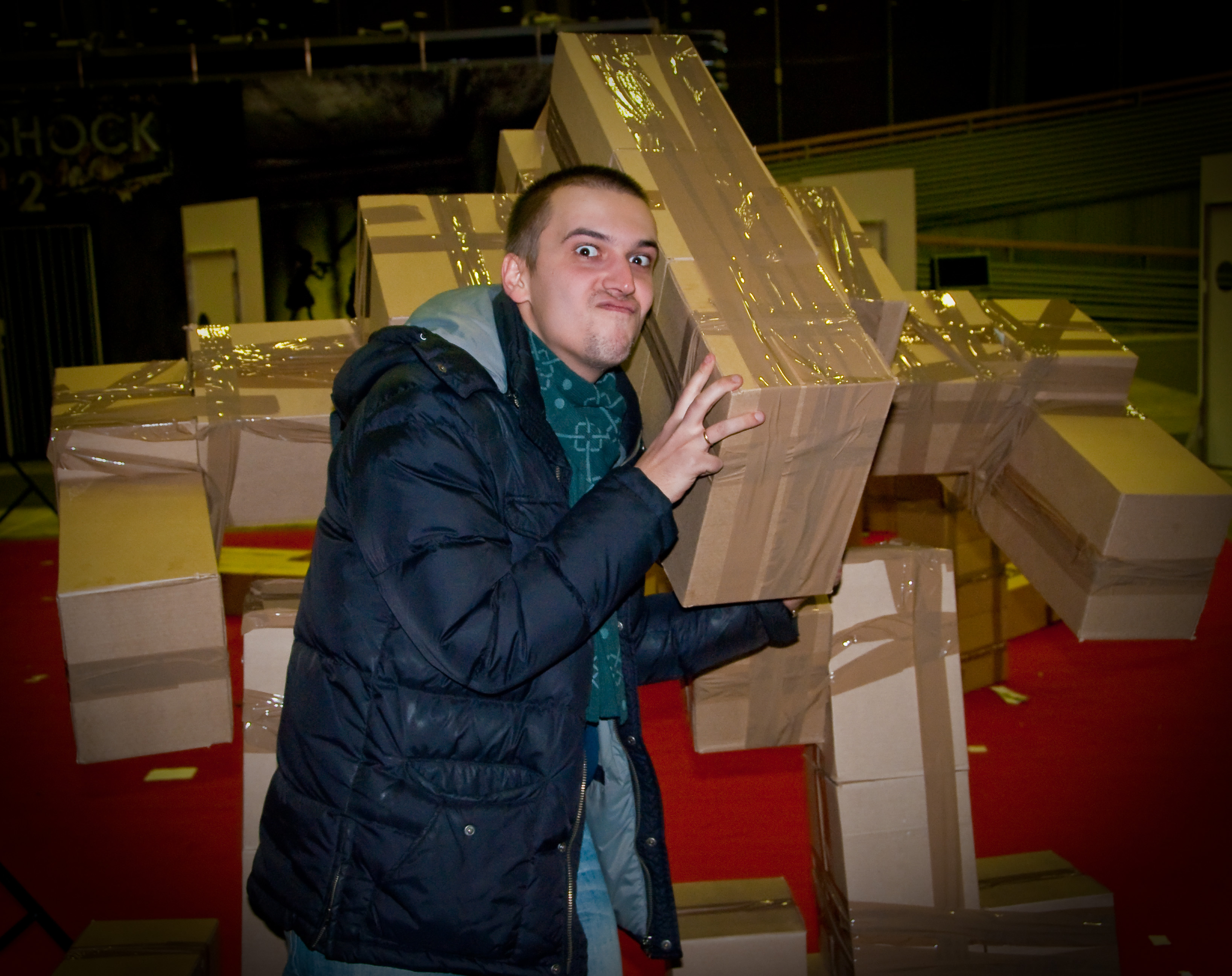
Alexander Kuzmenko, then editor-in-chief of Igromania, posing at Igromir 2009

The first issue of Igromania came out in September 1997. The magazine was founded by Evgeny Isupov and Alexander Parchuk who were both originally engaged in publishing books in Best Computer Games series and later decided to enter the magazine publishing business. Igromania is published by Igromedia publishing house, along with fantasy & science fiction magazine Mir Fantastiki.

The print run of the first issue was about 16,000 copies. Due to massive returns, the number of printed copies of consequent issues was significantly reduced. Originally, the magazine was black-and-white with only the cover being in color. It was planned to start full color printing in the summer of 1998 but the August crisis in the country forced to postpone such plans.

During the first years of publication, the editors could not decide upon the game platform preference of the magazine. If the first issue carried reviews of only a few PlayStation games, the following issue was entirely dedicated to games on this platform. Very soon the magazine focused on PC games and this focus remains unchanged till now with the only exception of Videomania section on one of its DVDs.

In 1999, Denis Davydov, who had previously worked in Hacker magazine and even before that had created Game World Navigator magazine, became editor-in-chief of Igromania. He initiated dramatic reforms in the magazine and, by 2002, the magazine completely changed its looks and content. Guides and solutions gave way to the widest spectrum of content: game news, previews, reviews, articles about hardware, software, the Internet, game modding and development, features, editors' personal columns, online and desktop games, cheats, retro games, cybersport, computer game competitions, and three hotlines (software, games, and game modding).

The DVDs that come with every issue of Igromania are very popular and attract a great attention. These disks carry content of all sorts. It is often said that many tend to buy Igromania only because of these disks.

In 2004, Videomania emerged as part of the magazine. Started as intro movies for each disk, it soon turned into a separate section. Videomania now has its own disk and is produced by a studio headed by Anton Logvinov. This studio also produces a regular television program about PC and videogames for A-One channel and video materials for Igromania website. All Videomania movies are dubbed by professional actors, such as Boris Repetur, one of the anchors of Ot Vinta! program that ran on Russian TV from 1994 to 1998.

Each issue of Igromania carries 30 to 60 pages of commercial ads. This relatively small amount of ads (considered to be small as the total size of the magazine is 216 pages) is explained by the publisher due to high advertising prices

In December 2018, Igromania ceased printing and only continued as a website. The next year the website was sold to Gaji Makhtiev, founder of Kanobu.

== Vision ==
Simplicity and clarity of information published in Igromania are the basic principles that the editors follow so that the published texts can be understood by the widest audience. Yet, unlike Best Computer Games magazine, Igromania does not avoid videogame slang.

== Content topics ==
Below is the list of permanent magazine content topics:

- News - a selection of monthly gaming news
- Previews - previews of upcoming games
- In the Spotlight - detailed previews (usually on four pages) of the most anticipated games
- Reviews - reviews on new released and soon-to-be-released games
- Domestic Localizations - reviews localized foreign games
- Game of the Month - results of the vote for the best game of the month (taken monthly at Igromania website) and advice from the editors about the games worth playing in the upcoming month
- Hotline: Games - answers to most frequently asked questions about games
- Game Over - retro games reviews, A Month in the History of Games calendar
- Iron Plant - reviews of new computer hardware, hardware tests, optimal component configurations and prices, and answers to the frequently asked questions about hardware
- Game Building - modding, reviews of game editors and SDKs
- Special - various special materials, such as game companies' histories, analytics, and reviews of new books and movies based on games
- Playing Online - online games news, previews, reviews, analytics, and interesting links
- CODEx - cheat codes, Easter eggs, and hints
- Igromania Mail - letters to the editor and answers
- Brainstorm - computer games knowledge contests (Test, Screentours, and Photographic Memory)
- Dissenting Opinion - personal columns

== Disks ==
Every issue of Igromania came with 2 dual-layer DVDs. One of them contains only video: trailers, video news, reports from special events produced by Igromania, and episodes of Ot Vinta! show. The second disk contained game demos, mods, online games installers (time limited or completely free versions), patches, useful software, flash games, cheat codes, saves, trainers, wallpapers, utilities for modding, and other useful things.

== Industry discussions ==
Starting from 2004, Igromania from time to time publishes controversial columns by leading industry analysts about the current situation on the Russian game development and distribution market causing thought provoking discussions among local publishers and developers. One of such columns, Say No to License published by Mikhail Verbitsky in May 2006, launched one of the hottest discussions among Russian publishers and developers.

== Exclusive ==
Igromania continues to provide to the Russian readers more and more exclusive materials about major Western and local game releases, as well as interviews with game developers. In the spring of 2005, Igromania was one of the three magazines (the others were Game Informer and PC Gamer UK) to publish the first preview of Command & Conquer 3: Tiberium Wars. In April 2007, Igromania was one of the first magazines in the world (alongside PC Gamer) to publish the first details about Guild Wars 2 and Guild Wars: Eye of the North.

== Management team ==
- Gadji Makhtiev - Owner and Director of Igromedia, Ltd.

== Editorial team ==
Igromania's editorial team, as of October 2019:

- Pasha Karasev - Editor-in-chief
- Dmitriy Kolganov - Editor of 'Hardware'
- Pasha Zanozyuk, Bogdan Zinovoy, Lera Ryzhova - Video Producers
- Ruslan Sokolov - Livestream Producer
- Dmitry Shepelev, Ekaterina Zhorova, Evgeniya Safonova, Denis Pavlushkin - Editors
