= Havok & Hijinks =

- Designers: Adam Trzonkowski and Kristen Trzonkowski
- Illustrators: Andy Carolan, Amanda Martin and Dan Stewart
- Publishers: Epic Slant Press LLC
- Players: 2-4
- Setup time: 1 minute
- Playing time: 15–30 minutes
- Chance: Medium
- Age range: 13+
- Skills: none

Havok & Hijinks is a card game designed and published by Epic Slant Press LLC in 2014. In it, participants play a baby dragon searching to fortify their hoard, with the goal to be the first player to obtain 15 points worth of treasure. Designed to allow for fast matches, games generally last between 15 and 30 minutes and can be played by two to four players.

== Description ==
The game involves 84 cards: 40 "Hijinks" cards, 40 "Havok" cards, and 4 double-sided Dragon cards (the Amber dragon, the Obsidian dragon, the Pearl dragon and the Ruby dragon). Other accessories are available, such as play mats and affinity tokens, but are not required for gameplay.

Hijinks cards are used as both offense and defense, depending on the card. Each card has an affinity and a bonus effect that dragons of matching affinities may take advantage of. Havok cards are split between Event cards and Treasure cards. Event cards can be beneficial or detrimental, while Treasure cards are advantageous. Both card sets often feature pun-infused card names such as "Three Dragon Moon," a reference to the Three Wolf Moon t-shirt, or "Panda-monium."

The double-sided Dragon cards included with the base game have one side (the "Ready" side) in which the dragon can perform one of two special abilities. These abilities are specific to that particular dragon (e.g. the Amber dragon has skills in trading while the Ruby dragon excels at stealing). Upon using one of these abilities, the dragon becomes tired and must be flipped over to the "Tired" side. While on this side, none of the dragon's abilities may be used. Only by fulfilling the condition listed on that side (e.g. the Obsidian dragon must successfully break a treasure) may the dragon be flipped back to the "Ready" side.

== Rules and Gameplay ==
The game begins by each player selecting a baby dragon to play as. Each player is then allotted a single treasure worth 1 point to begin their treasure hoard, as well as a hand of three Hijinks cards. A player's turn consists of up to four stages:

- Flip a Havok card. If the flipped card, the player may add it to their hoard. If it is any event, the player(s) must resolve it.
- Play Hijinks card. The player may play a single Hijinks card from their hand. They may also refrain from playing any cards or may discard a Hijinks card and draw a new one.
- Use dragon ability. The play may use one of their dragon's innate abilities. Upon using this ability, the dragon is flipped over to its "tired" side. Only after fulfilling the conditions listed on the card may the dragon be flipped back over to its "ready" side.
- Draw card(s). The player should draw so that their hand holds three Hijinks cards. If a player already has at least three cards, then that player draws no cards.

When a player has collected 15 points worth of treasure, they are declared the winner.

== Card sets ==
=== Expansions ===
- Havok & Hijinks: Mini-Expansion (a collection of 11 cards)
- Havok & Hijinks: Eastern Wind (introducing the Jade dragon)

=== Promotional cards ===
The game can be impacted by the double-sided dragon cards used by players. Epic Slant Press released several dragon cards not included in the base game. These additional cards include various cards of the Crystal Dragon, which has the ability to change elemental affinity, allowing for the player to capitalize on the bonuses found on all Hijinks cards. Such promotional cards were given out at various conventions, including Gen Con and Dragon Con, as well as to those who signed up for the company's newsletter.

Other promotional cards were included in the original Kickstarter campaign, including permutations of the original four dragon cards. Epic Slant Press LLC has made many of these promotional cards available for sale, where they aren't out of print.
