= Jealous (Labrinth song) =

Single by Labrinth
- Released: 23 November 2014
- Genre: R&B
- Length: 4:46
- Label: Syco
- Songwriters: Timothy McKenzie; Josh Kear; Natalie Hemby
- Producer: Labrinth

Labrinth singles chronology
"Let It Be" (2014)	"Jealous" (2014)	"Higher" (2015)

"Jealous" is a song by English electronic musician Labrinth. Written with Josh Kear and Natalie Hemby, the song was released on 23 November 2014.

== Style and production ==
Labrinth wrote "Jealous" in Nashville, Tennessee with Josh Kear and Natalie Hemby. It was produced by Labrinth and arranged by Gustave Rudman. The song, described as a "heart-breaking ballad" by MTV, is addressed to one of Labrinth's parents, who left the family when he was four years old. Speaking about the lyrical content of the song, Labrinth has offered the following explanation:

A lot of people have been through that experience. It’s kind of written from the perspective of how my family felt at the time, but I wanted to write it so anyone could dig into the song and relate to it to their own situation.

== Release and reception ==
The song, along with its accompanying music video, debuted on 31 October 2014. The single was released on 23 November 2014. The song re-entered the charts at number 25 in September 2015, following a performance from contestant Josh Daniel on The X Factor.

== Charts ==
Chart (2014–18)	Peak position
Australia (ARIA)	18
Belgium (Ultratip Bubbling Under Flanders)	54
France (SNEP)	9
Ireland (IRMA)	27
Netherlands (Single Top 100)	46
Scotland (OCC)	5
Sweden (Sverigetopplistan)	75
UK Singles (OCC)	7

== Certifications ==
Region	Certification	Certified units/sales
Australia (ARIA)	3× Platinum	210,000^{‡}
Denmark (IFPI Danmark)	2× Platinum	180,000^{‡}
New Zealand (RMNZ)	3× Platinum	90,000^{‡}
Spain (PROMUSICAE)	Gold	30,000^{‡}
United Kingdom (BPI)	2× Platinum	1,200,000^{‡}
United States (RIAA)	3× Platinum	3,000,000^{‡}
^{‡} Sales+streaming figures based on certification alone.
