= Let It Be (Labrinth song) =

Single by Labrinth
- Released: 28 September 2014
- Genre: R&B
- Length: 3:06
- Label: Syco
- Songwriter(s): Labrinth; Gustave Rudman
- Producer(s): Labrinth; Gustave Rudman; Mike Spencer (add.)

Labrinth singles chronology
"Lover Not a Fighter" (2014)	"Let It Be" (2014)	"Jealous" (2014)

"Let It Be" is a song by English electronic musician Labrinth. Written and produced with Gustave Rudman, the song was released on 28 September 2014.

== Style and production ==
Speaking about the song to the Official Charts Company, Labrinth has stated that he was influenced by acts such as Electric Light Orchestra, Nina Simone, James Brown and John Barry when writing and recording "Let It Be", explaining that he "wanted to go gospel and soul and mix it with rock and electronic production" on the track.

The lyrical content of the song is said to be influenced by Labrinth's anxiety over his second album, with the artist offering the following overview of the track's origins:

It doesn't sound like anything I've done before. It made me go back and look at all the other records again and be like, "Ah, maybe it needs to sound more exciting? Maybe it's not poppy enough? Or commercial enough." I started doing all these things that, after a great piece of work has been made, it starts to fuck it up. I had a bit of an anxiety attack, but after that I was just like, the only answer is to do what is right – just let go and let everything happen the way it is going to happen. That is where the record kind of came from.

== Release ==
The debut of "Let It Be" took place in the form of a live performance by Labrinth and his band at Camden Market in London on 17 August 2014, after which the song debuted on radio the following day. On 19 August, the full song was released online. Upon its release, Labrinth explained that "I knew I had been gone a long time and needed to come back with a single that was special, something forward-thinking ... I wanted an opening statement to my second album and I put extra pressure on myself to come up with that".

== Critical reception ==
Upon release, "Let It Be" received generally positive reception from critics. Writing for 4Music, reviewer Jessica Lever described the track as "fresh, catchy and upbeat". 4Music later called the song a "sexy new soul jam".

Idolator contributor Rachel Sonis explained that "While it might not be a party-starter like his Tinie Tempah-assisted club banger "Earthquake", ["Let It Be"] not only lets his sultry pipes shine through, but also shows a real maturation for the 25-year-old English crooner". Rachel Sonis of Idolator described the video as "dizzying" and "eerie", while a news story by radio station Kiss dubbed it "stripped back".

== Music video ==
The music video for "Let It Be", directed by duo Us (Luke Taylor and Christopher Barrett), was released on 27 August 2014. Announcing its release, Lewis Corner of website Digital Spy described that the video "sees a single camera shot pan over various stages [of] the album creation process, with Labrinth at the piano, in the recording booth, being interviewed on TV and getting frustrated in a record label meeting". A behind the scenes video was also released documenting the creation process for the music video.

== Charts ==
Chart (2014)	Peak position
Australia (ARIA)	36
Belgium (Ultratip Bubbling Under Flanders)	50
Scotland (OCC)	9
UK Singles (OCC)	11
UK Hip Hop/R&B (OCC)	1
