= Hobby World =

Publishing house in Russia and Eastern Europe

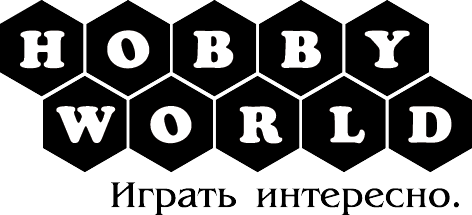
- Industry: Board games publishing
- Founded: 2010
- Headquarters: Moscow
- Subsidiaries: Mosigra, Zvezda, Mir Fantastiki
- Website: Official website (English)

Hobby World is a major publishing house in Russia and Eastern Europe specializing in producing and distributing board games of the following categories: games for children, family games, party games, strategy games, military games, collectible card games. The head office is located in Moscow.

== Company history ==
The company was founded in 2010 through the merger of the two competing companies «Fantasy World» and «Smart». The former was founded in 2003 in order to develop and publish the Berserk collectible card game, and since branched into publishing foreign CCGs, including Magic: The Gathering. The latter operated since early 2000s, and specialized in producing board games, such as localized versions of Catan. It also ran the "Labyrinth" board game club, which is where the two companies' heads first met in 2003.

In 2018 the company acquired the Mir Fantastiki science fiction and fantasy magazine.

In 2024 the company acquired the Zvezda scale model manifacturer.

== Products ==
The company publishes Russian editions of games such as Settlers of Catan, Carcassonne, Munchkin, Ticket to Ride, Game of Thrones, Arkham Horror, Warhammer.

Most board games components are produced in Russia, with manufacturers located in the Kaluga and Moscow regions. Some components are produced by European contractors. Overall, the company has developed over 200 board games,.

== Management ==
- Mikhail Akulov – General Director; formerly the head of "Smart".
- Ivan Popov – Executive Director; one of developers of Berserk.
- Nikolay Pegasov – Development Director; formerly the chief editor of Mir Fantastiki (2003–2009).
