= Zvezda (company) =

Russian scale model manufacturer

Zvezda LLC
- Type: OOO
- Industry: Model kits
- Founded: July 1, 1990 in Moscow, RSFSR
- Founder: Konstantin Krivenko
- Headquarters: Lobnya, Moscow Oblast
- Products: Plastic Model Kits, Board games
- Parent: Hobby World
- Website: en.zvezda.org.ru

Zvezda LLC is a Russian manufacturer of plastic scale models of airplanes, military vehicles, helicopters, ships and cars. It was the oldest and largest model kit producer in Russia.

== History ==
The company was founded in 1990 by Konstantin Krivenko. The company's first model kit was dedicated to the Soviet Army. Zvezda was acquired by Hobby World in 2024.

== Product lines ==
Zvezda produces model kits in many categories, ranging from historical collections to modern military models. The company has produced models in collaboration with Boeing, Tupolev, Kamov, Sukhoi and MiG, and some of their models are in the liveries of famous airlines such as Aeroflot and Utair.

They also produce miniatures for their Fantasy wargame "Ring of Rule".
