= Amirante =

Amirante may refer to:

== People ==
- Francesco Amirante (1933–2024), Italian magistrate
- John Amirante (1934–2018), American singer
- Salvatore Amirante (born 1984), Italian footballer

== Places ==
- Amirante Islands, Seychelles

== See also ==
- Almirante (disambiguation)
