= Gustave Rudman Rambali =

Franco-Swedish composer, arranger and producer

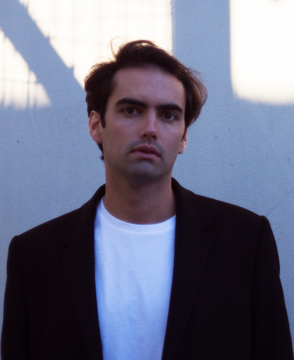
- Rambali in 2019

Background information
- Also known as: Gustave Naast
- Born: Gustave Chand Rudman Rambali; Paris, France
- Genres: Orchestral; urban; rock; hip hop
- Occupations: Composer; arranger; record producer; songwriter; orchestra conductor
- Instruments: Vocals; guitar; keyboards
- Years active: 2004–present
- Labels: EMI France; Source Etc
- Formerly of: Naast

Gustave Chand Rudman Rambali is a Franco-Swedish record producer, songwriter, composer, arranger and orchestra conductor. He is the former vocalist and guitarist of the group Naast, and has arranged or produced music for artists including Kanye West, Woodkid, the Weeknd, and Labrinth. He has since composed music for soundtrack of the HBO series Euphoria, as well as the 2021 documentary Tranchées, which was selected at the 78th Venice International Film Festival. In 2022, he composed original music for fashion shows by Balenciaga Alaia and Gucci. He worked with ¥$ (Kanye West and Ty Dolla Sign) on their collaborative album Vultures 1 (2024), as a producer and songwriter on its title track. Gustave Rudman is composing the music for the upcoming ballet "Etude", by choreographer Marcos Morau, to premiere at the Opera Garnier in March 2026 in Paris.

== Biography ==
Rambali is the son of Paul Rambali, a British rock critic from NME and editor of The Face. He was born in Paris, France and began learning piano as a child at his local conservatory. Aged 20, he enrolled at the Schola Cantorum de Paris. From there, he was admitted to the Conservatoire National Supérieur de Musique et de Danse de Paris where he studied composition and orchestration. In 2013, he received from the CNSMDP the Prix d’harmonie, and in 2015 the Prix d’écriture XX-XXIème.

In 2004, as Gustave Naast, he formed the group Naast with members Jeff Brakha, Nicolas Ballay and Lucas Sensi. His song "Mauvais Garçon" from their debut album Antichambre was featured in the video game Guitar Hero III: Legends of Rock (2007). In 2008, he disbanded the group to pursue his classical music studies. Later in the year, he composed the music for the animated children's TV series Podcats.

In 2011, his arrangement of the song Iron by Woodkid marked his career debut as an arranger and producer. The arrangement was later sampled by Kendrick Lamar for the track "The Spiteful Chant" from his debut album Section.80 (2011). Whilst continuing his studies, he composed, arranged or produced music for artists including Clean Bandit, The Weeknd, Birdy and LSD (a supergroup comprising Labrinth, Sia and Diplo). In 2015, he did arrangements for the track "Losers" from The Weeknd's Grammy award-winning album, Beauty Behind the Madness.

In 2017, he composed the soundtrack of Atacama, a short film directed by French contemporary artist Caroline Corbasson. In 2019, he composed music for the HBO TV series Euphoria, directed by Sam Levinson. In 2021, he composed the original soundtrack for the documentary Tranchées which had its out of category world premiere at 78th Venice International Film Festival. In 2022, he was invited by fashion brands Balenciaga and Alaia to compose the music for their haute couture shows at the Paris Fashion Week. He is now composing the music for the upcoming ballet "Etude", by choreographer Marcos Morau, to premiere at the Opera Garnier in March 2026 in Paris.

== Discography ==
Year	Artist	Track(s)	Credits
2006	Naast	"Mauvais Garçon"	Songwriter, arranger, co-producer, singer, guitarist
2007	Naast	"Va-Et-Vient"	Songwriter, arranger, co-producer, singer, guitarist
2007	Naast	"Point aveugle"	Songwriter, arranger, co-producer, singer, guitarist
2007	Naast	"Tu te trompes"	Songwriter, arranger, co-producer, singer, guitarist
2007	Naast	"Derrière cette porte"	Songwriter, arranger, co-producer, singer, guitarist
2007	Naast	"Coeur de glace"	Songwriter, arranger, co-producer, singer, guitarist
2007	Naast	"La fille que j'aime"	Songwriter, arranger, co-producer, singer, guitarist
2007	Naast	"Complications"	Songwriter, arranger, co-producer, singer, guitarist
2007	Naast	"Sublimation"	Songwriter, arranger, co-producer, singer, guitarist
2007	Naast	"Je te cherche"	Songwriter, arranger, co-producer, singer, guitarist
2008	Ian Parovel	Podcats (Soundtrack)	Composer, co-composer, lyricist, singer, guitarist, producer
2011	Woodkid	"Iron"	Arranger
2011	Woodkid	"Iron" (Remix by Mystery Jets)	Arranger
2011	Woodkid	"Iron" (Remix by Gucci Vump)	Arranger
2011	Kendrick Lamar	"The Spiteful Chant" (featuring ScHoolboy Q)	Arranger
2012	Entics	"Lontana Da Me"	Co-composer
2013	La Fouine	"A bout de bras"	Co-composer
2013	James Arthur	"Roses"	Co-composer, arranger, co-producer
2014	Ella Eyre	"Two"	Arranger
2014	Clean Bandit	"Extraordinary"	Co-composer
2014	Labrinth	"Let It Be"	Co-composer, arranger, programmer, orchestra conductor, additional vocals
2014	Labrinth	"Jealous"	Arranger, orchestra conductor
2015	Josef Salvat	"Shoot & Run"	Arranger, orchestra conductor
2015	Josef Salvat	"Punchline"	Arranger, orchestra conductor
2015	Josef Salvat	"Til I Found You"	Arranger, orchestra conductor
2015	Josef Salvat	"Closer"	Arranger, orchestra conductor
2015	Mika	"Ordinary Man"	Co composer, co-producer
2015	The Weeknd	"Losers" (featuring Labrinth)	Arranger, orchestra conductor
2016	Klingande	"Losing You"	Co-composer, arranger, co-producer, orchestra conductor
2016	Birdy	"Give Up"	Arranger, orchestra conductor
2017	Wilkinson	"Sweet Lies" (featuring Karen Harding)	Co-producer, programmer
2017	Noah Cyrus	"Again" (featuring XXXTentacion)	Co-producer, programmer
2017	Caroline Corbasson	Atacama (Original film score)	Composer
2017	Gustave Rudman	"Sun"	Composer, arranger, producer
2017	Gustave Rudman	"Intermezzo"	Composer
2018	Mikky Ekko	"Fame"	Strings and orchestration
2018	LSD	"Genius"	Co-arranger, additional production, additional vocal production
2018	LSD	"Genius" (Lil Wayne Remix) (featuring Lil Wayne)	Co-arranger, additional production, additional vocal production
2018	LSD	"Audio"	Arranger, co-producer
2018	LSD	"Mountains"	Additional production
2019	Labrinth	"Oblivion" (featuring Sia)	Arranger, orchestra conductor
2019	Sam Levinson	Euphoria (Episode 4)	Co-composer, co-producer
2021	Labrinth & Gustave Rudman	"Tears of a Synthesized Soul"	Co-composer, co-producer
2021	Woodkid	"Iron 2021"	Arranger
2021	Loup Bureau	Tranchées (Original film score)	Composer
2022	—N/a	Alaia for Paris Fashion Week (Original music)	Composer
2022	Caroline Corbasson	Physics (Original film score)	Composer
2022	Gustave Rudman	"Avion"	Composer
2022	—N/a	Gucci for Paris Fashion Week (Original music, featuring Marianne Faithfull)	Composer
2022	Gustave Rudman & Vanessa Beecroft	"Sometimes I Feel Like A Motherless Child"	Composer
2022	BFRND	Balenciaga for Paris Fashion Week - "Love in E Minor" (featuring Gustave Rudman)	Co-composer
2023	Gustave Rudman	"Two Shadows"	Composer
2023	¥$ (Kanye West & Ty Dolla $ign)	"Vultures" (featuring Bump J & Lil Durk)	Co-composer, co-producer
2024	Gustave Rudman	"Ghosts Of Us"	Composer
2026	Gustave Rudman	"Étude" for Palais Garnier (Opéra Garnier)	Composer
