= Chilean ship Almirante Williams =

Almirante Williams is the name that has been given to several ships belonging to the Chilean Navy. They are named after Chilean Admiral Juan Williams Rebolledo (1825–1910).

- Chilean destroyer Almirante Williams (1920), ex-HMS Botha, an Almirante Lynch-class destroyer, commissioned 1920, decommissioned 1933
- Chilean destroyer Almirante Williams (DDG-19), an Almirante-class destroyer, commissioned 1960, decommissioned 1996
- Chilean frigate Almirante Williams (FF-19), ex-HMS Sheffield, a Type 22 frigate, commissioned 2003, in active service
