= Almirante (surname) =

Almirante is an Italian surname. Notable people with the surname include:

- Ernesto Almirante (1877–1964), Italian actor
- Giacomo Almirante (1875–1944), Italian actor
- Giorgio Almirante (1914–1988), Italian politician
- Luigi Almirante (1884–1963), Italian actor
- Mario Almirante (1890–1964), Italian filmmaker
