= Deus (board game) =

Civilisation board game from 2014

- Designers: Sébastien Dujardin
- Illustrators: Ian Parovel; Maëva Da Silva; Christine Deschamps; Paul Laffont
- Publishers: Pearl Games (2014)
- Languages: English, French, German, Spanish, Italian, Dutch, Finnish, Polish, Danish, Czech, Swedish, Hungarian, Norwegian, Korean, Japanese, Portuguese, Russian, Greek
- Players: 2–4
- Setup time: <5 minutes
- Playing time: 60 Minutes
- Chance: Low
- Age range: 12+
- Skills: Planning, hand management

Deus is a civilisation-themed board game designed by Sébastien Dujardin, illustrated by Ian Parovel, Maëva Da Silva, Christine Deschamps & Paul Laffont, published in 2014 by Pearl Games and distributed by Asmodee.

== Gameplay ==
In Deus, players work to develop their civilizations. Players start the game with five cards to build their realm. There are six types of cards, each of a different color: green for resources, red for military, brown to get points, yellow for effects, purple for temples, and blue for merchants. Each time a player constructs a building in a specific location, he must discard the corresponding card to his personal board and then gain effects. The particularity of the game comes from the way players manage their board and the main terrain, as well as their approach to design.

== Expansions ==
=== Add-On Expansion ===
- Deus: Egypt adding a few more cards and renewing the whole mechanism.

== Reception ==
Despite its niche, Deus was acclaimed for its fresh approach with many awards. The game was nominated and selected by As d'Or 2015, 2014 Meeple's Choice, 2014 Board Game of the Year and 2014 Strategy Game of the Year, as well as the 2015 Kennerspiel Spiel des Jahres (Game of the Year) award nomination.
