= Mir Fantastiki =

Russian science fiction and fantasy magazine and website

- Cover of March 2015 issue featuring Jenna Coleman (left) and Peter Capaldi as their characters from Doctor Who
- Editor-in-chief: Sergey Serebryansky
- Categories: Science fiction and fantasy media
- Frequency: Monthly
- Publisher: Igromedia (2003-2018), Hobby World (since 2019)
- Total circulation: 15,000 (September 2016)
- Founded: 2003
- First issue: September 2003
- Country: Russia
- Based in: Moscow, Russia
- Language: Russian
- Website: Mirf.ru

Mir Fantastiki (Russian: Мир фантастики), officially abbreviated as MirF, is a Russian monthly science fiction and fantasy magazine. The name also refers to the website run by the magazine, Mirf.ru.

Mir Fantastiki literally translates from Russian as World of Speculative Fiction. In Western media it is often referred to as World of Fantasy or World of Fiction.

== Overview ==
MF was published by Igromedia publishing house, along with video game magazine Igromania, since September 2003. It is distributed in major ex-USSR countries via trade net and postal subscription, as well as through publisher-owned online shop Journalshop.ru. Its editorial office is situated in Moscow. The magazine was envisioned by Nikolay Pegasov, later best known as a board game publisher in the Hobby World publishing house.

Mir Fantastiki used to be one of the main Russian periodical SF&F editions, along with Esli and Polden, XXI vek. Since 2013 it remains the only broadly circulated survivor in its niche after an industry crisis. Unlike the other two, which were literary magazines publishing short stories, Mir Fantastiki is largely devoted to media review and sci-fi/fantasy geek subculture. It covers all sorts of science fiction and fantasy media, whether literature, movies, TV shows, video games or comics. Their official motto is "Fantasy and science fiction in all their aspects".

While the magazine is seen sometimes as a Russian counterpart to Locus or SFX, Mir Fantastiki shares certain traits with both. Its book section is largest and contains not only reviews, but also literary criticism and master classes of writing by experienced authors, most often by H. L. Oldie. However, in other sections it also covers mainstream western science fiction and fantasy franchises, such as Middle-earth or Star Wars, as well as video game and comic franchises. Mir Fantastiki reviews horror fiction as well, but less frequently than sci-fi and fantasy.

MirF annually publishes "Year's totals" and names the year's best books, films, games and other media. The magazine operates a website and official communities in VK, YouTube, Facebook, and other social media.

In 2018, Mir Fantastiki was sold to Hobby World. The magazine launched a crowdfunding campaign for revival in 2019 and raised over 5 million ₽, setting a new record for Russian media crowdfunding (the previous record, 3.5 million ₽, was held by Iskusstvo Kino). Following campaigns raised 6 million in 2020, 8 million in 2021 and 2022, 11 mln in 2023, and 13 mln in 2024. Mir Fantastiki campaign was of the most successful crowdfundings in Russia.

== Mirf.ru ==
Mir Fantastiki (World of Fantasy)
- Website type: Online magazine, forum.
- Available in: Russian
- Owners: Igromedia (2005-2018), Hobby World (since 2019)
- Creators: Sergey Serebryansky, Alexander Gaginsky
- Website: mirf.ru
- Registration: No
- Launched: 2004
- Current status: Online

According to Yandex, Mirf.ru is the second most popular science fiction & fantasy site in Runet. It was launched in 2004. Until 2015 it served as an archive of magazine's older articles and as a discussion forum.

Mirf.ru was relaunched in 2015. Since then it is updated daily and publishes articles, reviews, news and other content that only partially overlaps with the printed magazine.

== Content ==
There are several general sections in Mir Fantastiki:

1. Book Row - reviews of new releases in Russia, interviews with writers, literary criticism and biographic articles. Also includes comics subsection. Originally Book Row was the largest section of MirF, but throughout the 2010s it was gradually surpassed by Videodrome.
2. Videodrome - reviews of new films and TV series, interviews with filmmakers, articles about SF&F cinema of the past, notable filmmakers and special effects. Anime is covered occasionally.
3. Game Club - consists of the larger video game section and the smaller board game column.
4. Music Center - music album reviews. MF only reviews fantasy-, science fiction- or horror-related albums (in lyrics or concept), that usually includes heavy metal, electronic music and film scores. By 2016 it was adsorbed into Gate of the Worlds.
5. Gate of the Worlds - articles on the popular fictional universes, creatures and characters. Often includes "Top 10" of various fictional things, conventions reports and interviews with fantasy artists.
6. Time machine - the popular science section: articles dedicated to future technology, history and mythology, "what if" research, "Arsenal" column about weapons and military tactics.
7. Fun Zone - the entertainment section. It usually contains a short story by a popular Russian writer, a comic strip by artist Alexander Remizov, a reader's contest, and occasionally a collection of geek humour.

== Awards ==
Mir Fantastiki is a recipient of many Russian and international science fiction and fantasy awards.

- Eurocon "Best magazine" (2006, 2021)
- Internet-Roscon (2011) - for the website.
- Strannik Literary Award (2009)
- Zilantcon Durandal (2005)
- Aelita (2008)
- Ivan Yefremov prize (2008)
- Star Bridge (2008)
- Bronze Icarus (2005)
- The Second Try (2008)

Personal awards to MirF contributors for their works published in MirF:

- Alexander Belayev prize - to Mikhail Popov (2006) and Vladimir Puziy (2008)
- Rosсon Awards - to H. L. Oldie (2009, 2010, 2012, 2013, 2014) and Anton Pervushin (2009).

== See also ==
- Russian science fiction and fantasy
