= Colt Express =

2014 board game

- Box cover
- Designers: Christophe Raimbault
- Illustrators: Ian Parovel, Jordi Valbuena
- Publishers: Ludonaute (2014)
- Languages: English, French, German, Spanish, Italian, Dutch, Finnish, Polish, Danish, Czech, Swedish, Hungarian, Norwegian, Korean, Japanese, Portuguese, Russian, Greek
- Players: 2–6
- Setup time: 10 minutes
- Playing time: 30–40 Min
- Age range: 10+

Colt Express is a railway-themed family board game designed by Christophe Raimbault, Illustrated by Ian Parovel and Jordi Valbuena, published in 2014 by Ludonaute and distributed by Asmodee.

The game won the 2015 Spiel des Jahres, the 2015 As d'Or - Jeu de l'Année, 4 of the 2014 Golden Geek Award, the 2015 TricTrac Bronze award, the 2015 Lys Grand Public Winner, The 2015 Gouden Ludo, and the 2015 Hungarian Board Game Award. As of November 2016, over 450,000 copies of the game have been sold according to the publisher.

== Gameplay ==
In Colt Express, players represent bandits robbing a train at the same time; the goal is to become the richest outlaw of the Old West.

Players draw a "round" card which determines the number and order of play as well as whether to play the cards face up (visible) or face down (hidden). In the Schemin' Phase, players play cards to a central card stack following the outline on the round card. In the Stealin' Phase, the central card stack is turned over and the cards are turned over one at a time and the player who played the revealed card executes the action depicted.

Actions include "vertical movement" to move from inside the car to the roof or from the roof to inside the car, "horizontal movement" to move to the next car, or move up to 3 cars away if on the roof, "punch" to punch the player in the same car sending them to a neighboring car and causing them to drop one piece of loot, "shoot" to fire your gun at a player in a neighboring car or in your line of sight if on the roof, "steal" to take any loot on the floor, and "move marshal" to cause the marshal to move to a neighboring car and fire his gun at all bandits in the car, causing them to flee to the roof.

A game lasts for 5 rounds. A $1000 bonus is given to the first player who shoots all of their bullets, and the player with the most money is the winner.

== Expansions ==
The expansion packs build on the original game. They come with new elements and can only be played if the gamers have the base game.

=== Gameplay Expansions ===
Horses & Stagecoach
Released in 2015, Horses & Stagecoach adds a stagecoach with a gunman which path parallels the train cars. Players use the horses to jump off the train and onto the stagecoach. New loot is added as well as whiskey flasks which let a player draw extra cards or play an extra action card on their turn. Hostage, Event, and additional Round cards are added to enhance game play.
Marshal & Prisoners
Released in 2016, Marshal & Prisoners adds pawns and cards for two additional players, one of which is a player to control the Marshal and play against the other bandit players, the other a bandit named Mei. Also added are additional loot tokens and prisoner cards and a caboose which acts as a prison cell for the bandits. The marshal also has specific goal cards and there are new Round cards to add variety to each round of play.
Bandits
A set of six mini-expansions due for release in September 2018, for use with the base game only. Each expansion allows players to compete against one game-controlled bandit, adding new cards, tokens and gameplay mechanics for that bandit. Packs for Belle, Cheyenne, Django, Doc, Ghost, and Tuco will be made available.
Indians & Cavalry (not released)
An expansion only rumoured to have been in development, with no release date officially ever announced, this expansion may have added game elements of Indians and cavalry which may have added new dangers to the players. No further details from Ludonaute have been released as of 2026.
The Time Traveling Car
A mini expansion released in 2015, it allows players to hide their pawn under one of the train cars and play through the schemin' phase of the next round without other players knowing where one's character is. Its location is revealed at the beginning of the stealin' phase.
Its design is based on that of the DeLorean from the Back to the Future series.
North Pole Station
A mini expansion released in 2015, players must discard a loot token at the end of the round this round card is played.
The Tunnel before the Station
A mini expansion released in 2016, this is a hidden round phase where 3 of the 4 plays are hidden.
Plato Event Card
During the tunnel turns of this round, shots make bandits drop an item just like a punch would.
Colt Express Promo Cards (2015)
A set of 13 Round cards were released as a promotion.
Colt Express Hallowe'en (2022)
Seven (7) scary objective cards to be completed over the course of the game, one objective assigned to each player.
Colt Express Silk Bandit (2022)
An additional player character with her own set of three (3) possible bandit abilities to choose from, or create your own ability.
Colt Express Big Box (2022)
A full game collection of the Colt Express experience to date, combining the original Colt Express Base Game, with the two major expansions, Horses & Stagecoach and Marshal & Prisoners.
Colt Express Couriers & Armoured Train (2022)
A full box, major game expansion, that adds another train and extensive game mechanics that pit one team of bandits against another. Two additional bandit characters, Misty and the Twinz were introduced.

=== Game Accessories ===
Playmat
Released in 2014, this is long mat depicting a train track and desert scenery, where you can place the train cars. A revised playmat, that accommodates two tracks and a stage coach trail, is targeted for release (2023) for use with the Couriers and Armoured Train expansion.
Cursed Loot
A mini expansion released in 2016, adds seven loot tokens that are worth less than $10 each instead of several hundred dollars like the normal loot tokens.
Rock Promo
A mini expansion released in 2016, it is a rock decoration used as the base for players to play their cards on during the scheming phase of the game.
Train Station Terrain
A mini expansion released in 2016, it is a free standing, punchboard train station decoration used to hold the round cards.
The Punch Cards
A set of 7 alternate Punch cards released in 2016 that can either replace the base game's Punch cards, or be added to the base game to increase the likelihood of selecting a Punch card during the Schemin' phase.
Santa's Elf
Released in 2019, includes an Elf standee and 8 tokens (4 gift and 4 empty). Players are given randomly a gift or empty token and keep it hidden. The Elf standee follows player pawns as they move from his location on the train. Players with a gift token try to move the Elf toward the Locomotive, while players with an empty token try to move him toward the caboose. The location of the Elf at the end of the game determines the winning conditions for the players.

== Reception ==
The game has mostly received positive reviews with Board Game Quest mentioning "A highly entertaining game well worthy of the prestigious Spiel des Jahres award", BGL describing it as "unique, fun and memorable 3D board gaming experience" and iSlaytheDragon describing it as "very enjoyable game to play"

== Awards and honors ==
- 2015 Spiel des Jahres Winner
- 2015 Lys Grand Public Winner
- 2015 Tric Trac Bronze (France)
- 2015 Hungarian Board Game Award Winner
- 2015 Gouden Ludo Winner
- 2015 Gioco dell’Anno Winner
- 2015 As d'Or - Jeu de l'Année Winner
- 2014 Golden Geek Award Best Thematic Nominee
- 2014 Golden Geek Award Best Innovative Board Game Nominee
- 2014 Golden Geek Award Best Family Board Game Nominee
- 2014 Golden Geek Award Best Game Artwork & Presentation Nominee
