= Onitama =

Two-player strategy board game

- Manufacturers: Arcane Wonders; Pegasus Games
- Publication: 2014
- Genres: Strategic board game
- Players: 2
- Playing time: Approximately 15 minutes

Onitama is a strategy board game for two players created in 2014 by Japanese game designer Shimpei Sato and launched by Arcane Wonders. In Germany, the game was launched by Pegasus Games in 2017. It is thematically based on the different fighting styles of Japanese martial arts.

The game had a digital release in 2018.

== Equipment ==
The game is played on a 5x5 board. Each player receives five pieces: one master piece placed in the middle square of the back row, known as the Temple Arch, and four student pieces flanking the master. Five random movement cards (from the 16 available) are utilized per game and dictate how the pieces may move during the game.

== Gameplay ==
There are two methods to win a game: the first method, known as the Way of the Stone, requires the player to capture the opponent’s master piece; the second method, known as the Way of the Stream, requires the player to move their master piece on to the opponent's Temple Arch.

Each player begins with two movement cards face-up, and the fifth card is placed to the right of the starting player (as indicated on this card).

A player’s turn consists of choosing one of their two movement cards and moving one of their pieces (master or student) as described by that card. This used card is then placed to the right of their opponent (for them to pick up next turn). The player then picks up the card which was to their right to restore their two card hand. This allows both players rotating access to all five movement cards in play, but which ones depends on when each movement card is played.

A piece defeats an opponent’s piece by moving on to the same square as it. A piece may move through another piece, but only one piece may occupy each square. Players are not allowed to pass their turn unless they have no legal move. Play continues until one of the winning conditions is met.

== Expansion packs ==
Three expansion packs have been released.

"Sensei's Path" includes sixteen new and unique cards that can be used as a standalone set of movement cards instead of those found in the base game.

"Way of the Wind" introduces a neutral wind spirit that can be moved by both players. This is an impassable object, which neither student nor master pieces may displace from a square it occupies. If the wind spirit lands on a student piece, it does not capture it, but instead swaps places with it.

"Light and Shadow" was released in late 2021. It introduces a new piece called the Ninja.
