= Pierluca Zizzi =

Italian game designer

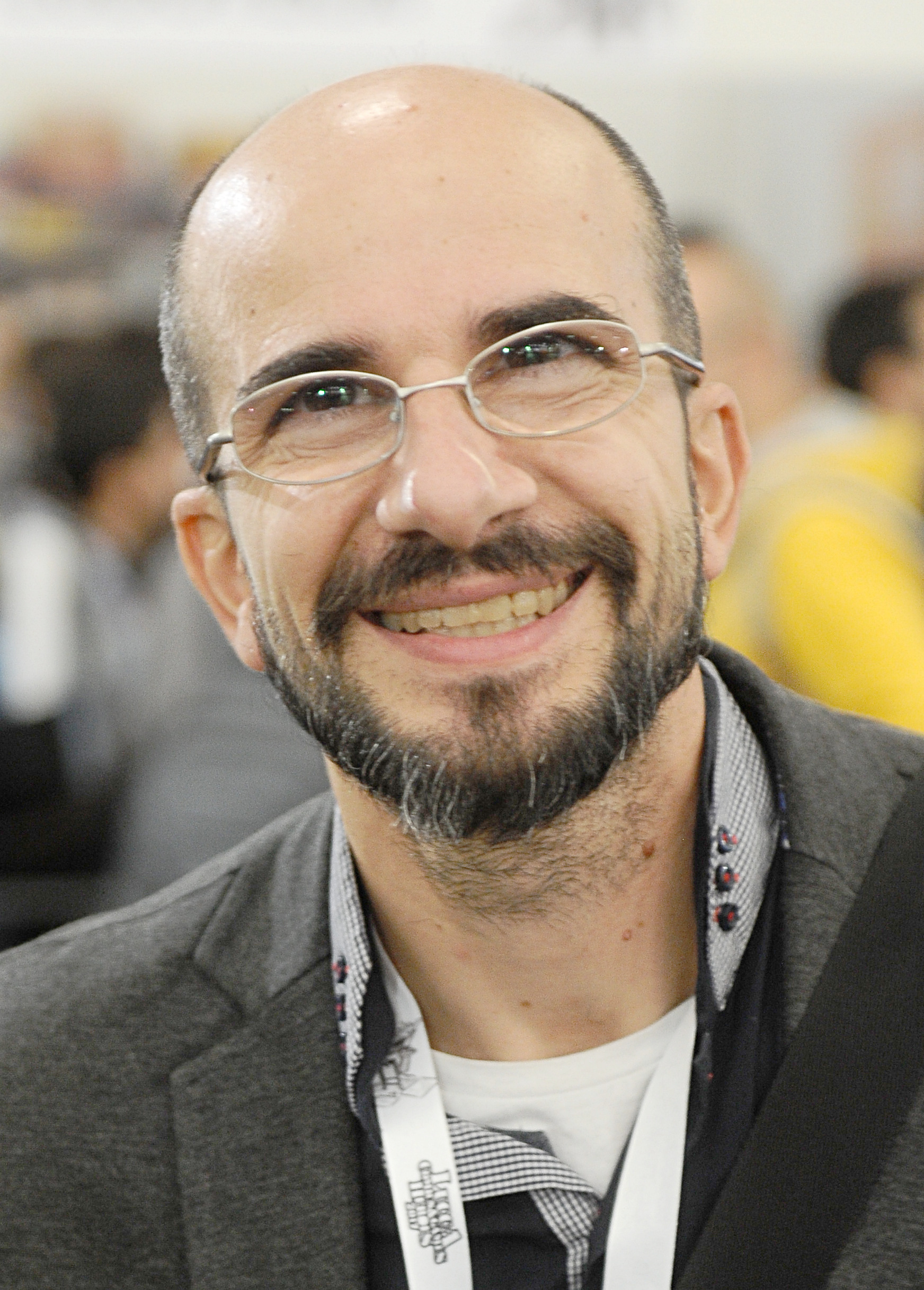
Pierluca Zizzi

Pierluca Zizzi is an Italian game designer, inventor and co-author of board games such as Asgard, Signorie and Tang Garden. He is a writer, game design teacher, and lecturer on consciousness development topics.

== Early life ==
He was born in Turin in 1970 and graduated from the Polytechnic of Turin.

== Career ==
Pierluca Zizzi began working as an architect.

=== Games ===
After ten years, he turned to games. He collaborated with Italian authors, such as Andrea Chiarvesio, Martino Chiacchiera, Francesco Testini and others.

His design style inserts strong narrative and setting elements into the rules structure (Dark Tales, Similo, and 3 Secrets). His games range from simple to complex. He loves fantastic or shrouded-in-mystery and investigation settings. Several of his projects have been successful on Kickstarter such as Barbarians: The Invasion, Tang Garden and others.

In 2019, he began teaching game design at the International School of Comics in Turin.

=== Writer and lecturer ===
Pierluca Zizzi is a researcher in the evolution of consciousness, and a writer. He is the author of the book Divinare per Tutti and a series of cards decks for divination and personal growth (Ascension Tarot, Infinity Tarot, Egyptian Tarot, Folk cards of destiny, Medieval fortune telling cards, Opposition Tarot in 2021 and Wanderer’s Tarot in 2023 and I tarocchi della fortuna in 2025).

He is the author of the books Geometria Sacra and Energia Sacra, Eros Sacro with Diana Migliano, the first three volumes of a tetralogy published by Psiche2.

Beginning in 2015, he attended conferences on symbolism, intelligent energy of places, modern initiations and human paradigm change. He has been interviewed in many webinars and television broadcasts.

Through his courses and books, Zizzi teaches and communicates a modern, free spirituality, without belonging to any particular esoteric school or religious tradition. Part of his thinking has been expressed in practical teaching manuals such as La coscienza dei luoghi in 2022, Nove viaggi iniziatici in 2025, and Anima e tarocchi in 2025 for the DeVecchi/Giunti publisher.

== Board games published ==
- 3 Segreti
- Al Rashid
- Arcanum
- Arcanum: The Witch
- Artè
- Asgard
- Barbarians the invasion
- Caligula
- Dark Tales
- Dark Tales: Cinderella
- Dark Tales: Little Mermaid
- Dark Tales: Little Red Riding Hood
- Dark Tales: Snow White
- Defence for Agarthi
- Hall of Fame
- Hyperborea
- Hyperborea: Light & Shadow
- Hyperborea: Promo Set
- Lamborghini: The Official Race Game
- Movie Trailer
- Signorie
- Similo
- Simurgh
- Simurgh: Call of the Dragonlord
- Tang Garden
