= Naast =

French rock band

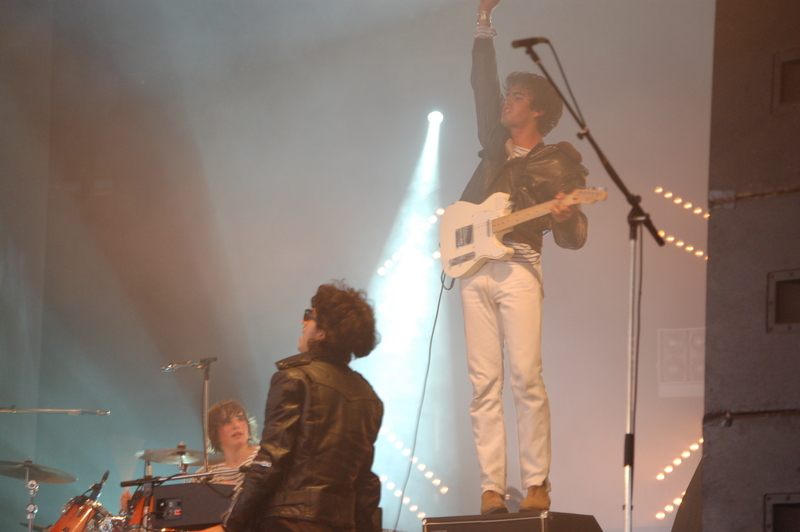
- Naast in 2007

Background information
- Origin: Paris, France
- Genres: Garage rock; indie rock
- Years active: 2004–2009
- Labels: EMI France; Source Etc
- Members: Gustave Naast; Nicolas Naast; Laka Naast; Clod Naast
- Website: Naast.fr

Naast were a French rock band. They are part of the nouvelle vague du rock français (New Wave of French Rock), which includes other bands like Les Plastiscines and Pravda. Their track "Mauvais Garçon" was included in Guitar Hero III: Legends of Rock.

== History ==
Naast was formed in Joinville-le-Pont in 2004. The band originally had just two members, neighbours Gustave (guitar and vocals) and Nicolas (drums). Their first concert was played in a pub in Paris, as a support act before The Parisians played.

In 2005 Nicolas and Gustave were joined by Clod (bass guitar, keyboard) and Lucas, known as Laka (guitar). Their concerts began to attract more and more fans and the magazine Rock&Folk, journalist Philippe Manoeuvre and Les Inrockuptibles have stood by them in the past. Jamie Hince, from the band The Kills, told The Guardian their concerts "caused mayhem with their innocent 1960s punky vibe" and referred to them as a band to look out for in 2006.

The group continued to develop further, taking inspiration from some of their idols by all adopting the Naast patronym (despite not actually being related). This follows in the footsteps of bands like The Ramones or The White Stripes (However, in the case of The White Stripes, the members' surnames actually were the same).

The master track of Mauvais Garçon, off their debut album Antichambre, appears in the video game Guitar Hero III: Legends of Rock as a bonus track. The group split up in 2009.

== Discography ==
=== Albums ===
- 15 January 2007 - Antichambre ("Waiting Room")

=== Singles ===
- January 2007 - Mauvais Garçon ("Bad Boy")
- March 2007 - Tu te trompes ("You're Wrong")
