= Hyperborea (RPG) =

Hyperborea RPG (known as Astonishing Swordsmen and Sorcerers of Hyperborea in its first two editions) is a sword and sorcery themed tabletop role-playing game developed by Jeffrey Talanian and published by Northwind Adventures.

The game was first published in 2012 and was nominated for several ENnie awards in 2013. A second edition was published in 2017 and the currently available third edition in 2022.

The game rules are loosely based on the first edition of Advanced Dungeons and Dragons rules, and the game belongs to the Old School Renaissance (or "OSR") movement within the role-playing game scene.

== Reception ==
In a review of Astonishing Swordsmen & Sorcerers of Hyperborea in Black Gate, John ONeill said "Overall, I'm extremely pleased with Astonishing Swordsmen & Sorcerers of Hyperborea, and expect to spend the last few days of 2012 digging deeper into the contents of the box."
