= Mosigra =

Russian board game publisher

- Company type: Private
- Industry: Entertainment
- Founded: 2008; 18 years ago
- Headquarters: Moscow, Russia
- Area served: Russia
- Key people: Dmitry Kibkalo, Dmitry Borisov
- Products: Board games
- Revenue: more than 600 million rubles in 2015
- Number of employees: 250
- Website: http://mosigra.com/en/

Mosigra is a Russian company, one of the country’s largest federal networks of board games shops.

== History ==
The company was founded in 2008 by a graduate of Mechanics and Mathematics Faculty of Moscow State University, Dmitry Kibkalo and his friend Dmitry Borisov. After university Kibkalo had worked for the press department of the FC Spartak, in the PR-agency IMA-consulting; his last post as an employee was an executive director of producing centre Kolizey Production Center.

Business emerged from the idea of a New Year gift: a printed and illustrated version of the board game The Jackal, invented by students and faculty of Moscow State University in the 1970s. Kibkalo hired an illustrator, but the producers refused to make only one piece, so he had ordered 100 copies of the game, having invested about 500 thousand rubles. Kibkalo could not arrange to sell the unused 80 copies at children's shops and bookstores. In November 2008, together with Borisov, he launched an online store. In addition to The Jackal partners presented 20 popular board games and in two months they got back the initial investment. After four months, they expanded the range of games to 100 names and opened a pick-up point near the Belorusskaya metro station.

In March 2009 Kibkalo and Borisov invested several hundred thousand rubles of their own funds into the opening of the first store near the Taganskaya metro station. It was followed by franchise stores in St. Petersburg and Kyiv. Soon Kibkalo quit the Kolizey and focused on development of Mosigra. In summer 2010, private entrepreneurs under the guarantee and security of the goods in the warehouse, received loans from Absolut Bank and Uniastrum and invested them in new stores. A separate company Magellan concentrated on development of their own games, localization of foreign games and production. The company began to present the news games to the market using this brand name. By the end of 2010, Mosigra had 16 stores, including 10 franchise shops, which originally did not suppose the payment of royalties and lump sum contributions: the condition was to work with a single supplier and organize game rooms. By 2012, the number of stores increased to 70. After that Mosigra revised the franchise terms and refused to expand in regions.

According to consulting company Gradient Alpha, by the end of 2013, the company controlled from 12 to 15% of board games in the Russian market. In March 2016 the network included 27 own stores and 41 franchised stores in Russia, Ukraine, Belarus and Kazakhstan, and a turnover of more than 600 million rubles.

== Business model ==
In contrast to logical puzzles and strategic games (for example, Civilization and Catan), which formed the basic stock of special shops at the time when first Mosigra shop opened at Taganka, the company focused on casual games for big companies. Mosigra cooperates with major distributors of foreign manufacturers and Russian publishers of games and produces from 1 to 10 thousand copies of their own games. The company’s own products (80 games) are distributed through a network of shops, which account for about 50% of turnover. Also at different times they were sold in stores Art. Lebedev Studio, Soyuz, Euroset, Detsky Mir, Republic and Ozon.ru.

Originally developed games The Jackal and Danetki are among the best-selling games and are released in about 50,000 copies a year; another 100 thousand copies accounts Opyata, Yorsh, Boom and Crocoparty games. Among the most popular are also Imadjinarium, Alias, Svintus, Monopoly, Mafia, Hive, 7 ate 9, Medved, Do not rock the boat!, Wizard of Emerald City and Chameleon. Also Mosigra licenses its games Nefarious and Mindmaze for the Western market. According to the company about a million boxes of games are sold each year, about half of them – from December to February.

Mosigra cooperates with the authors of games, invites developers for presentations and signs contracts with the winners of competitions. In most cases, the authors concede rights to the game to the company and get 10% off the wholesale price of the edition. The company also distributes popular party games of other manufacturers. For example, "Stupid Casual company" sells 70% of Imadjinarium through Mosigra.

For corporate customers the company produces limited series of games – the original design or popular games with branding. Mosigra released a special board game School of the future supplier for an event by Moscow Government dedicated to state purchases. Another board game became a part of advertising campaign of the series Law of stone jungle, released on TNT channel. A game Favorite game TV channel Friday!, launched together with the channel Friday!, won the award Mediabrand contest as the Best off-air promotional campaign. Game development for corporate clients, among which there are MegaFon and Toyota, have brought Mosigra 130 million rubles of revenue in 2015.

Employees of shops work as actors, animators and play board games with each other and visitors. Purchases are tracked through the discount system, which is used for individual stimulating activities. The company's main audience – people between 25 and 35 years old.

=== Game rooms ===
The only advertising tool of the company – temporary game rooms at major events and permanent game rooms located in cafes, restaurants and other spaces in the cities. The company organized entertainment points at the music festivals Nashestvie and Usadba Jazz, Afisha Picnic. In 2012, Mosigra conducted a special game room for disabled people during the day Together Against Hemorrhage.

== Owners and management ==
Kibkalo and Borisov control 43.9% of the company each. Among the owners are the CEO of the company Andrew Sitarskii (1%), Boris Solodukhin (1.2%) and Igor Poleshchuk (10%).

In 2013 Forbes magazine included Kibkalo in the list of 9 Russian entrepreneurs-millionaires under 33 years old, who built companies with a capitalization of over $10 million in the second half of the 2000s. In 2013 edition of Hopes & Fears (which was part of Look At Media Publishing House) ranked Kibkalo 23rd in the list of Russian entrepreneurs, in 2014 they put him to 21st position.

In 2015 the publishing house Mann, Ivanov and Ferber released a book Business as a game: the Hook of Russian business and unexpected solutions, written by Sergei Abdulmanov in collaboration with Kibkalo and Borisov. The book generalized the entrepreneurial experience of the authors in the advice about business. In 2016 the book became the winner of the award PwC Business Book of the Year in Russia. A Russian channel Strana announced Kibkalo as one of the heroes of the TV project Interview, dedicated to the most successful Russian businessmen, government officials and public figures. Release is scheduled for 2016.

== Links ==
- Official website

Overview publications

- Surganova, Elizaveta (2016). Игра на понижении [Playing Short] (in Russian). RBC Information Systems.
- Nikolay Grishin (2011-12-05). "Развлечение прибыли: эпидемия игромании" (in Russian). Kommersant.
- Zarina Kodzaeva (2012-10-25). "Пошаговая стратегия: Как "Мосигра" превратила настольные игры в хит" (in Russian). Hopes&Fears.
- Alexey Upatov (2013-08-01). "Игры для взрослых" (in Russian). Свой бизнес.

Further reading

- Sergei Abdulmanov; Dmitry Kibkalo; Dmitry Borisov (2015). Бизнес как игра: Грабли российского бизнеса и неожиданные решения [Business as a game: the Hook of Russian business and unexpected solutions]. Moscow: Mann, Ivanov and Ferber. p. 176. ISBN 978-5-00057-811-7.
