= Paul Rambali =

British rock critic and writer (1957–2024)

Paul Rambali (21 February 1957 – 10 January 2024) was a British rock critic and writer. He was the father of Gustave Rudman Rambali.

== Biography ==
Along with writers including Nick Kent, Paul Morley and Charles Shaar Murray, Paul Rambali was one of the UK's music journalists of the 1970s. He wrote for the British music publication New Musical Express during the '70s where he published reviews and articles about several major bands, including David Bowie. He interviewed John Cale, Captain Beefheart, Frank Zappa and the Clash, then left NME and moved on to become one of the editors of The Face from 1980 until 1987.

Rambali died from prostate cancer on 10 January 2024, at the age of 66.

== Bibliography ==
- It's All True – In the Cities and Jungles of Brazil,
- French Blues: A Not-So Sentimental Journey Through Lives and Memories in Modern France,
- Boulangerie, New York: Macmillan, 1994, ISBN 0-02-600865-3,
- Barefoot Runner (a book about Abebe Bikila).
