= Imperial Settlers =

Card game

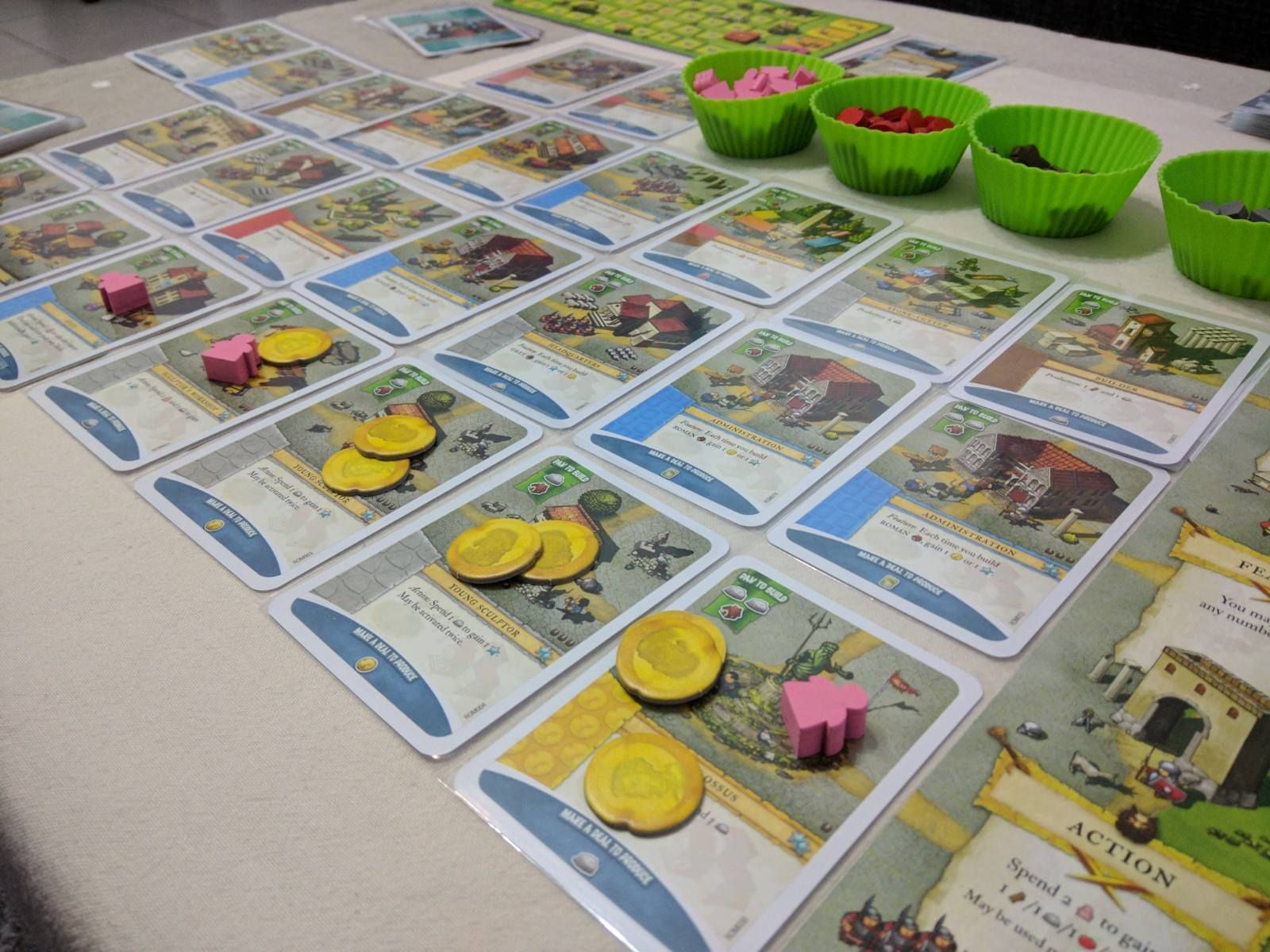
- A solo game, with Romans against Barbarians
- Designers: Maciej Obszański; Ignacy Trzewiczek
- Publishers: Portal Games
- Publication: 2014; 12 years ago
- Players: 1-4
- Playing time: 45-90 minutes
- Age range: 10+

Imperial Settlers is a 2014 city-building themed card-driven strategy board game published by Polish company Portal Games and designed by Maciej Obszański and Ignacy Trzewiczek.

The game was inspired by the computer game series The Settlers that Trzewiczek played when he was young.

It won the 2014 Golden Geek Best Solo Board Game, 2014 Board Game Quest Awards Best Card Game and 2015 Gra Roku Advanced Game of the Year Winner awards.

== Reviews ==
- Casus Belli (v4, Issue 12 - Nov/Dec 2014)
