= Ian Parovel =

French art and film director

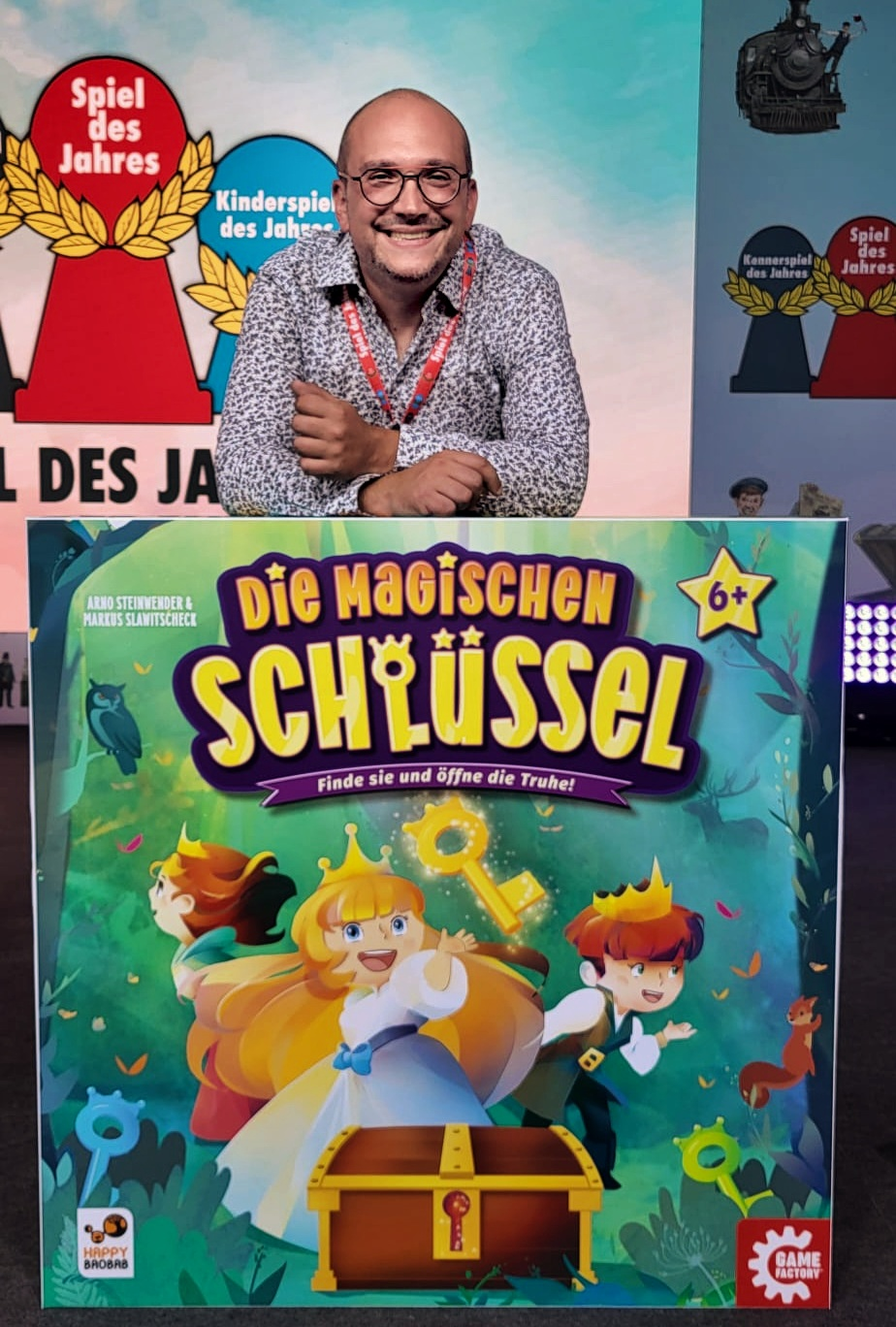
- Born: Ian Parovel; January 15, 1983 (age 43); Metz, France
- Occupations: Art director, film director, game designer, screenwriter
- Known for: The Podcats; GOSU; Colt Express; 300Km/s; Deus; Minivilles

Ian Parovel (born 1983 in France), is a French art director, film director, game designer, screenwriter, and designer living in Saint-Germain-en-Laye.

He is best known as the creator and screenwriter of the 3D animated television series The Podcats and the Legends Of Luma game collection.

It was during the ceremony of the As d'Or/Game of the Year 2015 that he was noticed by the boardgame industry, being congratulated several times by the various laureates during the show.

== Biography ==
It was during his childhood that his grandfather and his uncle introduced him to video editing, by training him to video tools and shooting super 8 films. Later, in 1995, discovering the Amiga demoscene that he will be particularly interested in the animation of synthesis, while being initiated to Lightwave.

After an education in business school, Ian Parovel pursued literary studies in audiovisual section at the Lycom (French movie school). He will then give up in the last year, in favor of a booming activity: Video Jockeying. Fascinated by television programs dealing with virtual images such as Micro Kid's Multimedia featuring virtual characters, the Imagina festival and Pixar's first short films, he decided to devote himself entirely to the creation of computer-generated images and animations.

It was also during these years that he learned by himself most of the graphic software suites, as well as coding demos.

In 2007 he was spotted by Eric Chevalier, director of the show Micro Kid's, who invited him to join the animation studio Okidoki to create a new animated series, The Podcats, on which he worked for nearly 5 years.

Since the success of the series, his skills are demanded by video game studios (Ubisoft) and board games (Ludonaute, Asmodee) in addition to his activity as art director for other studios (Disney Television, EuropaCorp).

In 2017 he created with Ludonautes a new series of board games in an all-new episodic and linear format called serial games: The Legends Of Luma.

In 2020 he joins Board Game Arena for which he already worked since 2016, mostly on the overall design and graphic chart. He will then take care of the UX, reaching 5 Millions members in December 2020.

Author of games and books, he also gives lectures about the links between design, interfaces and gameplay.

== Filmography ==
- 2001 : Dream, short movie concept : Film director / Animator
- 2005 : Aldebert, 3D animated short movie : Film director, Screenwriter, Animator
- 2007 : La couleur des anges, stop-motion short movie : Film director, Screenwriter, Animator
- 2008-2009 : The Badabops, Animated TV show, Disney Television Network : Compositing/FX
- 2009-2011 : The Podcats Season 1, Animated 3D TV show, France Télévision : Creator, Author, Screenwriter, Art Director
- 2011-2013 : The Podcats Season 2, Animated 3D TV show, France Télévision : Creator, Art Director
- 2010 : Dress me up - Fashion Week 1st Edition, TV Advert : Film director
- 2010 : 8 to 9, short movie : Screenwriter, Film director
- 2011 : Buzz Me i'm Fashion - Fashion Week 2nd Edition, TV Advert : Film director
- 2011 : Lights in the city - Fashion Week 3rd Edition, TV Advert using light-painting : Film director
- 2011 : WhyTivi, TV Identity : Creator
- 2013 : 300 000 Kilomètres/Seconde, short movie : Compositing/VFX
- 2014 : Detective Academy, Advert : Compositing/VFX
- 2014 : Colt Express, Advert : Film director
- 2016 : Ticket to Ride, Advert : Film director
- 2017 : Legends Of Luma, Advert : Film director

== Games ==
=== Graphic designer ===
- GOSU, 2010, Moonster Games/Asmodee
- Fame Us, 2011, Moonster Games/Asmodee
- Hattari, 2011, Moonster Games
- GOSU: Kamakor, 2011, Moonster Games/Asmodee
- GOSU 2: Tactics, 2012, Moonster Games
- Streams, 2012, Moonster Games/Asmodee
- Texas Zombies, 2012, Moonster Games/Asmodee
- Minivilles (aka Machi Koro), 2013, Moonster Games/Asmodee
- Koryo, 2013, Moonster Games/Asmodee
- Choson, 2014, Moonster Games/Asmodee
- Colt Express, 2014, Ludonaute
- DEUS, 2014, Pearl Games
- Ryu, 2015, Moonster Games Asia
- Intrigues, 2016, Igiari
- DEUS: Egypt, 2016, Pearl Games
- Oh Capitaine!—Legends Of Luma, 2017, Ludonaute
- Nomads—Legends Of Luma, 2017, Ludonaute

=== Art director ===
- Minivilles (also known as Machi Koro), 2013, Moonster Games/Asmodee
- DEUS, 2014, Pearl Games
- Le Petit Prince: Voyage vers les étoiles, 2014, Ludonaute
- Touch Down!, 2017, Happy Baobab
- Oh Capitaine!—Legends Of Luma, 2017, Ludonaute
- Nomads—Legends Of Luma, 2017, Ludonaute

=== Game designer ===
- A Table, 2009, Ugines Games Award
- Cadavres, 2010, Morten Publishing
- My Big World, 2014, with Dave Choi, Happy Baobab
- My Big World: Korea, 2014, with Dave Choi, Happy Baobab

=== Role-playing books ===
- Mon voisin Frankenstein, 2002, electronic book
- Phalanx, 2005, electronic book

=== Video games ===
- Crazy Dog (mobile), 2007, Mighty Troglodytes
- Smash The Mole (mobile), 2007, Mighty Troglodytes
- Gob'nFrog (mobile), 2007, Mighty Troglodytes
- Lucky Luke: Outlaws (mobile), 2008, Mighty Troglodytes
- The Legend of Spyro: The Eternal Night (mobile), 2008, Mighty Troglodytes
- Podcats: Guitar Zéro (web), 2009, Okidoki Studio
- SearchMan (web), 2010, Okidoki Studio
- Wagaaa! (web), 2010, Okidoki Studio
- The Podcats Virtual Web Tour (web), 2011, Okidoki Studio
- Wargame: Red Dragoon (PC), 2014, Ubisoft/Eugen System

== Conferences ==
- Intuitivité & Ergonomie : Le facteur humain dans l’interface homme-machine, 2013, Open du Web, Paris
- Make The Logo Bigger : An how-to graphic design for games, 2017, Master Class of BoardGame Design, Séoul

== Awards ==
- 2006 : 1st place Festival De Courts for the animated short-movie Aldebert
- 2007 : 1st place Concours des créateurs d'Ugine for the game A Table
- 2009 : International Design Award Best in ClassInternational Design Award for art direction of the animated series The Podcats
- 2009 : W3 Gold Awards World Wide Web Award for technical performance on The Podcats official website
- 2010 : Interactive Media Awards (IMA) for the dedicated games & website for The Podcats
- 2010 : Junior Communication Award Actukids for the marketing campaign on The Podcats
- 2012 : Nominated As d'or Jeu de l'année for the boardgame Fame Us
- 2014 : Nominated As d'or Jeu de l'année for the boardgame Koryo
- 2015 : 1st place Award As d'or Jeu de l'année for the boardgame Colt Express and nominated for Minivilles
- 2015 : Spiel Des Jahres Award Spiel Des Jahres for the boardgame Colt Express
