= Spyfall (card game) =

Card game

- Origin: Ukrainian
- Designer: Alexandr Ushan
- Publisher: Hobby World
- Release date: 2014
- Type: Social deduction game
- Players: 3–8
- Age range: 13+
- Playing time: 6–10 minutes
- Website: https://hobbyworldint.com/portfolio-item/spyfall/

Spyfall is a 2014 card game for 3–8 players designed by Alexander Ushan and published by Hobby World. A sequel, Spyfall 2, was published in 2017. A superhero themed variant, DC Spyfall, was published in 2018. The game's core premise revolves around uncovering the spy hidden among the players. As the game has evolved, new variations and "advanced rules" have emerged, introducing elements like multiple spies.

== Gameplay ==
A typical game of Spyfall lasts for between 6 and 10 minutes, depending on the time control. Each player receives a card representing the same location, except one player who receives a "spy" card. The spy has to guess the location, while other players have to identify the spy. On their turn, players ask each other questions, trying to lure the spy out without giving them too much information about what the location is. At any time during the game, or at its end when the timer runs out, one player can accuse another of being the spy; if there is a consensus and the spy is identified, the spy loses; otherwise, the spy wins. Additionally, at any time the spy can announce that they are the spy, and try to guess the location. If successful, the spy wins, otherwise the spy loses.

== Awards ==
Spyfall was a 2016 Årets Spil Best Adult Game Winner. It was also nominated for the 2016 Spiel des Jahres award. Spyfall 2 was the runner up in the 2017 Best Party Game category for the BoardGameGeek award.

== Spycon ==
In 2019, Ushan created Spycon, a team based variant of Spyfall in which two teams, each with a spy, try and guess the hidden character card of the other team.

== External pages ==
- Spyfall at BoardGameGeek
