= JewWario =

American YouTuber (1971–2014)

Justin Carmical
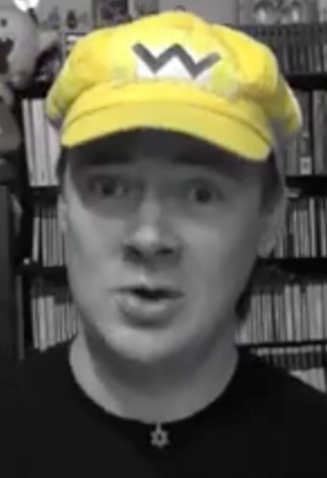
- Carmical in 2014
- Born: April 11, 1971; Colorado Springs, CO
- Died: January 23, 2014 (aged 42)

YouTube information
- Channel: JewWario
- Years active: 2006–2014
- Genre: Gaming
- Subscribers: 31,000
- Views: 3 million

Justin Carmical (April 11, 1971 – January 23, 2014), known online as JewWario, was an American YouTuber and actor. He was known for making videos centered around Japanese video games. He created his channel in 2006 and was active until his death in 2014.

== Career ==
Carmical was known for his video series, You Can Play This, which first started out on the website That Guy With The Glasses, which was created by Doug Walker.

== Death ==
The day of his death, Carmical had filmed a collaborative music video with Youtuber Jonathan Mann. He shot himself and died by suicide on January 23, 2014. It occurred after he was accused of grooming, assaulting producers of Channel Awesome, and sexual misconduct.

== Legacy ==
A tribute film named Farewell, FamiKamen Rider was released the year after he killed himself. The film has since been denounced by the creators of said film.

Fellow YouTuber BennettTheSage placed a JewWario hat on his DVD shelf at the end of his review of the anime Outlaw Star.
