= 2014 in esports =

List of events in 2014 in esports (also known as professional gaming).

== Calendar of events ==
(for extended events the final date is listed)

Date	Game	Event	Location	Winner/s
January 1	Dota 2	WPC ACE Dota 2 League	Shanghai	
January 5	League of Legends	LNL Winter Season 2014	Taiwan	ahq e-Sports Club
January 11	League of Legends	Garena Premier League Winter 2014	Singapore	Taipei Assassins
January 19	Dota 2	SLTV StarSeries Season VIII	Kyiv, Ukraine	No Tidehunter
January 19	Dota 2 League of Legends; StarCraft II	G-League 2013 Season 1	Online; Singapore (finals)	LGD Gaming ? Jim
January 25	League of Legends	OnGameNet The Champions	Yongshan, Seoul	Samsung Galaxy Blue
February 1	numerous games	IEM Season VIII - São Paulo	São Paulo	see article
February 9	World of Tanks	WGL NA Season III	San Francisco	SIMP
February 5	Dota 2	Nexon Sponsorship League (NSL) Season 3	Korea	Team Zephyr
February 23	Crossfire	Crossfire Stars (CFS) - Season 2	Chengdu, China	AG.PEPSI
March 2	World of Tanks	WGL RU Season III	Minsk, Belarus	Natus Vincere
March 16	numerous games	IEM VIII World Championship	Katowice	see article
March 16	Counter-Strike: Global Offensive	EMS One Katowice 2014	Katowice, Poland	Virtus.pro
March 30	Smite	Smite Launch Tournament	Cobb Energy Performing Center	Team SoloMid
March 30	Heroes of Newerth	HoN Tour Season 2 World Finals	Las Vegas	stayGreen
March 30	Call of Duty: Ghosts	Call of Duty Championship 2014	Los Angeles, California	compLexity
April 4	World of Tanks	Wargaming World of Tanks Grand Finals	Warsaw, Poland	Natus Vincere
April 5	StarCraft II	WCS 2014 Season 1: Korea	Seoul, South Korea	Zest
April 6	League of Legends	GPL Spring 2014	Singapore	Taipei Assassins
April 12	Dota 2	Korean Dota League (KDL) Season 1		Team Zephyr
April 13	StarCraft II	WCS 2014 Season 1: North America	Cologne	HyuN
April 13	StarCraft II	WCS 2014 Season 1: Europe	Cologne	MC
April 13	League of Legends	NA Challenger Series Spring 2014	Manhattan Beach, California	LMQ
April 15	Dota 2	Dota 2 Champions League (D2CL) Season 2	online, European server	Natus Vincere
April 19	League of Legends; Counter-Strike: Global Offensive; StarCraft II; FIFA 14	Copenhagen Games 2014	Copenhagen, Denmark	Ninjas in Pyjamas; Ninjas in Pyjamas; HyuN; Skoldie
April 20	League of Legends	LCS Season 4 Spring	Los Angeles, California, United States	Cloud9
April 27	StarCraft II; Hearthstone	DreamHack Bucharest 2014	Bucharest, Romania	
April 29	League of Legends	International Esports Tournament (IET) 2014		
May 4	Dota 2	SLTV StarSeries Season IX		
May 17	Dota 2	Fragbite Masters 2014		
May 24	League of Legends	OGN The Champions Spring 2014		
May 25	League of Legends	LPL Spring 2014		Oh My God
June 2	Dota 2	World E-Sports Professional Classic (WPC) 2014		
June 8	Dota 2	The Summit		
June 8	League of Legends	OGN LoL Masters 2014		
June 16	StarCraft II	E-Sport SM 2014 Finals		
June 16		DreamLeague Season 1		
June 16		DreamHack Summer 2014		
June 22	numerous games	MLG Anaheim 2014	Anaheim, California, US	
June 24	Dota 2	D2L WC		
June 25	Dota 2	D2CL Season 3		
June 28	StarCraft II	WCS 2014 Season 2: Korea		
June 29	Dota 2	KDL Season 2		
June 29	Dota 2	ESL One Frankfurt	Commerzbank Arena, Frankfurt	
June 29	CS:GO	ESEA S16 LAN		
July 6	StarCraft II	WCS 2014 Season 2: North America		
July 6	StarCraft II	WCS 2014 Season 2: Europe		
July 11–13	fighting games	Evo 2014	Westgate Las Vegas; Las Vegas, Nevada, US	
July 21	Dota 2	The International 2014	KeyArena; Seattle, Washington	NewBee
August 3	Call of Duty: Ghosts; Counter-Strike: Global Offensive; FIFA 14; StarCraft II	Gfinity G3 London 2014		
August 9	StarCraft II	2014 SK Telecom Proleague	South Korea	KT Rolster
August 16	League of Legends	OGN The Champions Summer 2014		
August 16	League of Legends	GPL Summer 2014		
August 17	CS:GO	ESL One: Cologne		
August 24	League of Legends	LPL Summer 2014		EDward Gaming
August 24	League of Legends	Challenger Series Summer 2014		
September 1	League of Legends	LCS Season 4 Summer		
September 7		WEC 2014		
September 12	League of Legends	X Championship Season I	China	EDward Gaming
September 13	Dota 2	Game Show League S1		
September 14	StarCraft II	KeSPA Cup 2014		
September 27	Dota 2	EMC Season 2	Moscow	Team Empire
September 27		DreamHack Stockholm 2014		
September 28	Dota 2	i-League	China	
October 4	StarCraft II	WCS 2014 Season 3: Korea		
October 5	StarCraft II	WCS 2014 Season 3: Europe		
October 5	Dota 2 Hearthstone	World Cyber Arena (WCA) 2014		LiBo (Heathstone); Cloud9 (Dota 2)
October 5	Dota 2	Korean Dota 2 League Season 3		
October 10	CS:GO	ESL One New York		
October 12	StarCraft II	WCS 2014 Season 3: North America		
October 17	League of Legends	YY Chinese Soloqueue Challenge 2014		
October 19	League of Legends	2014 League of Legends World Championship		
October 26	Dota 2	SLTV StarSeries Season X		
October 26	Call of Duty: Ghosts	MLG Call of Duty: Ghosts League Season 3		
November 2	Dota 2	NEST 2014		
November 2	Hearthstone etc.	DreamHack Masters Bucharest 2014		
November 2	numerous games	ESWC 2014	Paris Games Week; Porte de Versailles, Paris, France	see article
November 2	Dota 2	Dota 2 Champions League (D2CL) Season 4	Bucharest, Romania	Natus Vincere
November 3	League of Legends	Black Monster Cup Fall 2014	Western Europe (online)	
November 8	StarCraft II	WCS 2014 Global Finals	Anaheim, California, US	Life
November 8	Hearthstone: Heroes of Warcraft	Hearthstone World Championship 2014	Anaheim, California	Firebat
November 16	Dota 2	IeSF 2014 World Championship		
November 22	League of Legends	Riot Latin America Cup 2014		
November 29		DreamHack Winter 2014		
December 3	Dota 2	Dota Pit League S2		
December 6	Dota 2	SLTV StarSeries Season XI	Ukraine	
December 7	Dota 2	The Summit 2		
December 7	Dota 2	NESO 2014		
December 7	League of Legends	IEF 2014		
December 7	Crossfire	Crossfire Stars (CFS) 2014		
December 13	League of Legends	Demacia Cup Season 2		
December 13	Ultra Street Fighter IV	Capcom Cup 2014	The Warfield; San Francisco, California	EG Momochi
December 20	Dota 2	KDL Season 4		
December 21	Dota 2	XMG Captains Draft 2.0		
December 28	Call of Duty: Ghosts	MLG 5K Series		
December 28	Dota 2	G-League 2014		
