= Almirante (board game) =

Portuguese board game

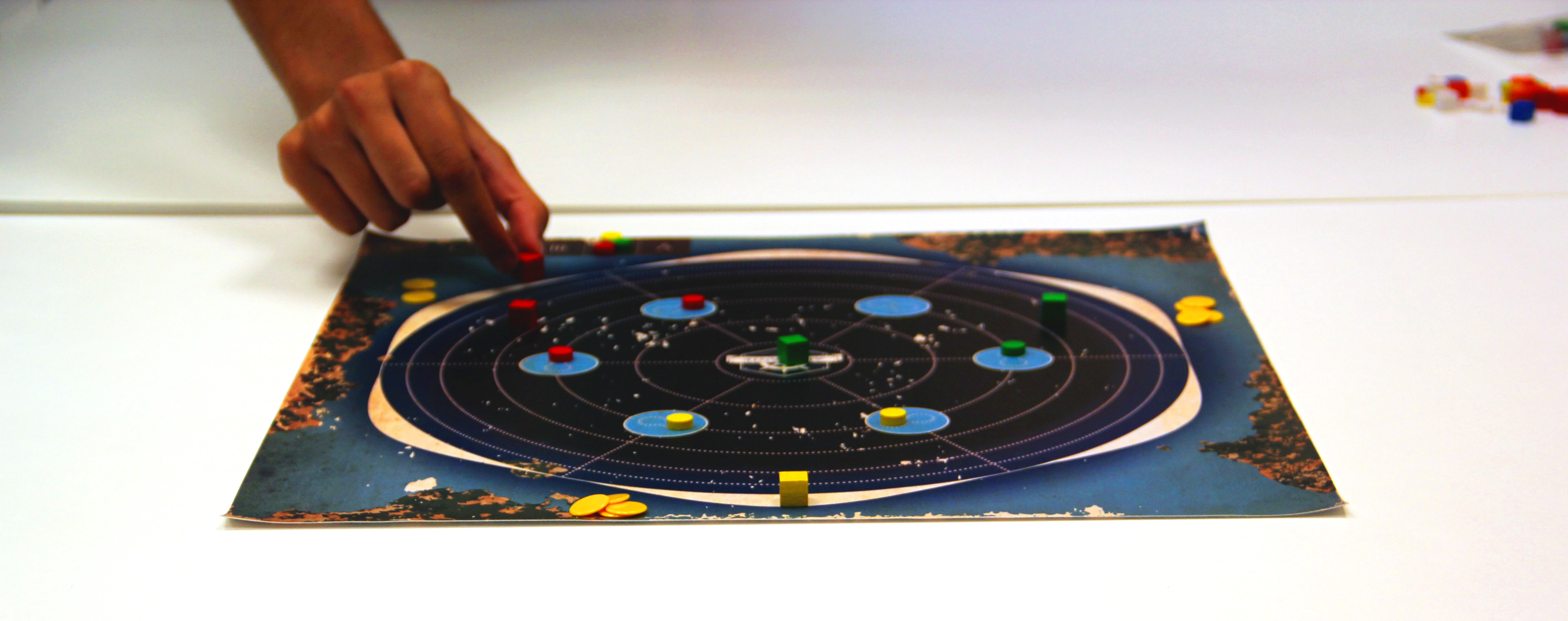
A first edition Almirante board game.

Almirante, the Game of Sea Domination, is a Portuguese strategy board game for up to six players. The object of the game is to dominate the center of the seas and of the board.

The game was created and is produced by Jogos Almirante, Lda., a company founded in 2014 by young entrepreneurs.

== Game Play ==
"Almirante" is Portuguese for "admirals". Each of the 2 to 6 players command both a merchant and a war navy with the objective of controlling the geostrategic center of the ocean. Players use winds and coins to build and operate their fleets, with predetermined values of wind necessary to move a fishing boat or a galleon, for example, and coin to build different types of vessels. Both resources, wind and coin, can be traded by paying a conversion fee.

Each player also has the ability to use a "god card", which grants extra winds or instantly sink an opponent's ship, for example.

The game is over when one fleet has controlled the center of the ocean four times.
