= Hyperborea (game) =

- Designers: Andrea Chiarvesio; Pierluca Zizzi
- Illustrators: Miguel Coimbra; Fabio Gorla
- Publishers: Asterion Press
- Genres: Fantasy
- Players: 2–6
- Playing time: 90 minutes

Hyperborea is a fantasy board game designed by Pierluca Zizzi.

== Overview ==
Players each control a kingdom with unique abilities they use to build a civilization through magic, combat and exploration.

== Reception ==
In a review of Hyperborea in Black Gate, John ONeill said "If you're familiar with epic-scale fantasy games, you know they take a lot of time to set up and play. Hyperborea skirts much of that with an intriguing "bag-building" mechanic, which simulates some of the depth of typical civilization games, but yields a shorter play time."

== Reviews ==
- Casus Belli (v4, Issue 12 - Nov/Dec 2014)
