= Fury (Russian TV series) =

Upcoming Russian web series

- Promotional poster
- Фурия
- Genre: Superhero
- Based on: Red Fury comic series by Artyom Gabrelyanov
- Country of origin: Russia
- Original language: Russian

Production
- Producers: Artyom Gabrelyanov; Mikhail Kitaev; Olga Fillipuk
- Production companies: Bubble Studios; Kinopoisk

Original release
- Network: Kinopoisk

Fury (Russian: Фурия, romanized: Furia) is an upcoming Russian TV series co-produced by Bubble Studios and Kinopoisk, based on the Red Fury Russian comic book series by Bubble Comics. The series is part of the Bubble cinematic universe along with the movie Major Grom: Plague Doctor. Even before the shooting of the debut films of the studio, a short and feature film adaptations of comics about Major Grom, Artyom Gabrelyanov talked about plans to shoot film adaptations of other Bubble comics, if the first films prove successful. The success of Major Grom: Plague Doctor was mixed: despite the box office failure, the film achieved popularity on streaming platforms. In this regard, the filmmakers noted that they would continue to create film adaptations, but most likely by order and funding of streaming platforms such as KinoPoisk HD and Netflix. The series was announced on October 1, 2021. Artyom Gabrelyanov, Mikhail Kitaev, and Olga Filipuk will be the producers of the series.

The story is taking place in Moscow and tells the story of the professional female thief Nika Chaikina nicknamed Fury, who is involved in the war of criminal organizations. The authors noted that the appearance of Moscow will be changed from the real one by analogy with St. Petersburg from the film Major Grom: Plague Doctor: if Petersburg was made look more "historical", Moscow in the Fury will look much more futuristic. It is planned that Holt International the weapons corporation that was the antagonist in the Red Fury comic book, which was mentioned in the film Major Grom: Plague Doctor, will be an important part of the story in the series. In addition, a cameo of Igor Grom himself performed by Tikhon Zhiznevsky was announced. At the presentation Kinopoisk during the announcement of the series, the authors announced the basic concept of the original comic series will remain in the film adaptation, while the plot will undergo significant changes.
