= Major Grom: The Game =

2024 Russian superhero film

- English version theatrical release poster
- Directed by: Oleg Trofim
- Written by: Artyom Gabrelyanov; Nikolay Shishkin; Yekaterina Krasner; Oleg Trofim; Roman Kotkov; Evgeny Eronin; Evgeny Chebatkov
- Based on: comic book series Major Grom by: Artyom Gabrelyanov; Evgeny Fedotov
- Produced by: Artyom Gabrelyanov; Michael Kitaev; Olga Filipuk; Roman Kotkov; Evgeny Eronin; Denis Popov
- Starring: Tikhon Zhiznevsky; Lyubov Aksyonova; Aleksei Maklakov; Aleksandr Seteykin; Sergei Goroshko; Dmitry Chebotaryov; Matvey Lykov; Andrey Trushin; Olga Sutulova; Konstantin Khabensky
- Cinematography: Maxim Zhukov
- Edited by: Dmitri Komm
- Music by: Roman Seliverstov
- Production companies: Bubble Studios; Plus Studio
- Distributed by: Central Partnership
- Release dates: April 26, 2024 (MIFF); May 23, 2024 (Russia)
- Running time: 168 minutes
- Country: Russia
- Language: Russian
- Budget: ₽871 million
- Box office: ₽577 million; $6.1 million (worldwide)

Major Grom: The Game (Russian: Майор Гром: Игра) is a 2024 Russian superhero film based on the comic book series Major Grom by the Russian publisher Bubble Comics, in particular on the story arc The Game. Created by Bubble Studios in collaboration with Plus Studio and distributed by the Central Partnership film distribution company, the project is a direct sequel to the film Major Grom: Plague Doctor (2021) and the third motion picture in the Bubble Cinematic Universe (BCU) media franchise.

The film was directed by Oleg Trofim, and the script was written by Artyom Gabrelyanov, Nikolay Shishkin, and Yekaterina Krasner. It stars Tikhon Zhiznevsky returned to the role of Major Grom, alongside Lyubov Aksyonova, Aleksei Maklakov, Aleksandr Seteykin, Sergei Goroshko, and Dmitry Chebotaryov.

The action takes place a year after the main events of The Plague Doctor. In the story, Grom becomes quite popular in his native Saint Petersburg and faces a new villain known as The Ghost. Work on The Game began in November 2022, when the process of creating the film Grom: Boyhood (2023) was still being completed, and two months later the project was officially announced. Filming took place in March 2023 at various locations in St. Petersburg.

Major Grom: The Game was chosen as the opening film of the 46th Moscow International Film Festival, which premiered on 26 April 2024, and was theatrically released in Russia on 23 May 2024.

== Plot ==
The film takes place in St. Petersburg exactly one year after police major Igor Grom caught a serial killer in the guise of the Plague Doctor, under whose mask was hiding billionaire and philanthropist Sergei Razumovsky.By this time, Major Grom is at the peak of his popularity among the citizens of St. Petersburg. Once again, he and his partner, Lieutenant Dmitry Dubin, confirm their reputation by using brute force to eliminate a prisoner riot in the Central Prison of St. Petersburg.

Meanwhile, Deputy Minister of Internal Affairs Lieutenant General Maria Arkhipova is planning a police reform that involves replacing a significant portion of the force with combat drones. She travels to St. Petersburg to conduct comparative tests, where she is shown how a single drone from the Holt International corporation can neutralize targets faster and more effectively than a whole team of experienced police officers. However, Arkhipova is in no hurry to sign a contract with the creator of the devices, August van der Holt, whose company had made the Plague Doctor costume a year earlier.

During a date between Grom and journalist Yulia Pchyolkina, an attempt is made on their lives. Grom pursues the masked suspect, but he is defeated in hand-to-hand combat and falls out of a window. During the fight, Igor notices a brand on his opponent's hand - the inscription "15:26".

An unknown enemy starts a cruel game with Grom over the phone, during which terrorist attacks occur in the city - the explosion of the Alexandria Column, and then the explosion in Peterhof. Igor Grom manages to find himself in the epicenter of events and attract people's attention, but he is unable to prevent the explosions, and his popularity among Petersburgers is replaced by contempt. The enemy, who has already received the nickname Ghost, offers Grom to resign if he does not want the terrorist attacks to continue. The major harshly refuses Ghost.

From former journalist Alexey Prishchurov, Grom learns that the bearers of the "15:26" brand are mercenaries from the "Dead Squad", an elite special forces unit working in the interests of those in power. Grom suspects van der Holt of organizing the terrorist attacks, bursts in on him during negotiations with Arkhipova and tries in vain to disrupt the conclusion of a deal that has been brewing due to the terrorist attacks on transferring police functions to drones. Grom's boss, Fyodor Prokopenko, in an attempt to save his protégé from responsibility, resigns, transferring his powers to Arkhipova.

Dubin's own investigation into the prison riots leads him to its boss, Leonid Frolov, who immediately tries to escape, but his car is blown up with him. At the moment of the explosion, Dubin smells the familiar smell of "Plague Doctor" Razumovsky's explosives, goes to the police evidence storage facility and discovers that all the bombs stored there have disappeared while the police were distracted by the prison riots.

Yulia Pchyolkina is also investigating the ongoing terrorist attacks. Through psychiatrist Veniamin Rubinstein, Sergei Razumovsky's attending physician, she contacts a hermit with the "15:26" brand and learns that the mysterious bomber nicknamed Ghost is mercenary Oleg Volkov, Razumovsky's childhood friend, believed to have died in Syria. According to the hermit, Volkov can only be found if he wants to be found. Van der Holt tries to eliminate Volkov, but he manages to deal with the entire capture group, including its commander, Otto Schreiber.

Pchyolkina publicly reveals the identity of the terrorist, and the police, during the search, reach Volkov's base in an abandoned building. During the assault, it is discovered that only Prokopenko is in the building mined by Volkov, who dies in the explosion in front of Grom. In a rage, the major breaks into the psychiatric hospital to Razumovsky and, in an attempt to beat out information about Volkov, beats up the patient. Grom is neutralized and brought to Rubinstein, who tells the major about Razumovsky's split personality, outwardly noticeable by the change in the color of the iris.

After some time, Volkov bursts into the city television studio and announces live that he will blow up several metro stations with passengers if the citizens do not kill Grom within three hours. All police drones are switched off, and riots begin in the city.

Dubin is once again on the trail of Sergei Razumovsky: it turns out that he is the author of the computer virus that disabled the drones. Grom, Pchyolkina and Dubin kidnap Razumovsky from the hospital, and while Pchyolkina and Dubin provide the police with the results of their investigations, the major goes with the kidnapped patient to Volkov. During the fight between Grom and Volkov, Razumovsky stops the timer, defuses the bombs in the metro and restores the drones' functionality.

Suddenly, Razumovsky is possessed by his second personality, the Bird. He shoots Volkov, who is dressed in a super suit, and reveals to Grom his plan for revenge, which has been followed by all the events that have happened in recent days. Police drones begin methodically killing everyone who was somehow connected to Igor Grom, even, for example, a joint photo on social networks. During the attack, Lieutenant Dmitry Dubin is also seriously wounded. Van der Holt bursts into the TV studio in a super suit and engages in a fight with the wounded Volkov. In an attempt to stop the mass murder, Igor takes a selfie with Razumovsky. The plan works: all the drones are retargeted at both of them. Razumovsky is mortally wounded, but manages to turn off the devices, and only at death is he freed from the influence of his evil essence.

Petersburgers mourn the dead, Volkov is taken into custody, and Grom appears in court. The major refuses the line of defense offered to him, admits his guilt, and announces his decision to resign.

In a post-credits scene, Thunder's eyes change color to yellow, and Rubinstein examines Thunder's personnel file with a "superhuman" sticker on it.

== Cast ==
- Tikhon Zhiznevsky as Major Igor Grom, a police detective with the Main Police Department of St. Petersburg
- Lyubov Aksyonova as Yulia Pchyolkina, video blogger and journalist, Major Grom's girlfriend
- Aleksei Maklakov as Colonel General Fedor Prokopenko, head of the Main Police Department of St. Petersburg
- Aleksandr Seteykin as Dmitry "Dima" Dubin, police lieutenant, Major Grom's partner
- Sergei Goroshko as Sergei Razumovsky, founder of the social network Vmeste, patient of a psychiatric hospital
- Dmitry Chebotaryov as Oleg Volkov, Sergei Razumovsky's childhood friend, assassin
- Matvey Lykov as August van der Holt, director of the weapons corporation Holt International, a Dutchman of Japanese descent, the Ghost's employer
- Andrey Trushin as Otto Schreiber, Holt's bodyguard and right-hand man
- Olga Sutulova as Lieutenant General Maria Arkhipova, Deputy Minister of Internal Affairs
- Konstantin Khabensky as Dr Veniamin Rubenstein, psychiatrist

Other cast members

- Oleg Yagodin as Alexey Prishchurov, a former journalist
- Yulia Parshuta as Anna Terebkina, a news anchor
- Alexandra Cherkasova-Sluzhitel as Sofa, Dr Rubinstein's assistant
- Evgeniy Chebatkov as the "Uncle", the leader of the prison gang
- Andrey Atlas as Leonid Frolov, the prison governor
- Anastasiya Nemolyaeva as Elena Prokopenko, wife of Colonel General Fedor Prokopenko
- Maria Glazkova as the judge
- Evgeny Bazhenov (cameo appearance) as himself

== Production ==
=== Development and preparation for production ===
==== Initial work ====
The first reports about the development of a sequel to the film Major Grom: Plague Doctor (2021) appeared back in November 2022. Then a number of insiders announced that an adaptation of the story arc called The Game was planned. The work began at the same time that the prequel film Grom: Boyhood (2023) was being completed. Artyom Gabrelyanov (also the film's producer), Nikolay Shishkin and Yekaterina Krasner worked on the continuation script. The script consultants were the editor-in-chief of Bubble Comics (and part-time creative producer of The Game) Roman Kotkov, as well as Evgeny Eronin and Nikolay Titov, who worked on The Plague Doctor. According to director Oleg Trofim, during the process of working on the sequel, "Own style, the basic principles of the cinematic universe and how to tell this story" were more clearly formulated.

The film, titled Major Grom: The Game, was officially announced on 28 January 2023 at Bubble Comics Con. The premiere was set for 2024, Trofim again became the director, Tikhon Zhiznevsky, Lyubov Aksyonova, Aleksandr Seteykin and other actors from the first film returned to their roles; It also announced the appearance of some characters from the comics and a completely new character called the Phantom. According to Gabrelyanov, producer and one of the screenwriters of The Game, the project will show how Igor Grom will be influenced by the popularity that fell on him after the events of The Plague Doctor. In February 2023, Zhiznevsky began working out at the gym in preparation for filming, given criticism of his physique in the first film. According to Trofim, The Game will become "a wide, spectatorial, amazing attraction", but at the same time it will retain the "emotional depth and poignancy" that was in The Plague Doctor and Grom: Boyhood. In the same month, Gabrelyanov announced that the plot of the original comic book had been completely rewritten, and also announced his imminent arrival in St. Petersburg for filming and called Grom: Boyhood a "bridge" between The Plague Doctor and The Game. Trofim was normal about the possible indignation of the audience due to the change in the plot compared to the original and believed that "For some, certain of our decisions may become a tragedy, but for others they will allow us to take a fresh look at our favorite material. It all depends personally on each viewer and reader. And yet, it won't be boring. We always have something to surprise us with. This is our main principle - turns and unpredictability". Also in the project, the storyline of "the second personality of Sergei Razumovsky, the Plague Doctor" was further developed. According to Sergei Goroshko, who plays Razumovsky, six months before filming the film, he went on a diet and lost "17–18 kilograms". "Even before filming the first film, I consulted with all the doctors whose specialization begins with the letter "P", except for the pediatrician. I wasn't trying to play a crazy person, I was trying to understand what it's like to be crazy, to figure it out over my head", he said.

=== Filming ===
The principal photography period began on 16 March 2023 in Saint Petersburg, and the cameraman of The Plague Doctor and Grom: Boyhood Maxim Zhukov returned to his position. The action scenes were staged by the Kazakh studio "Kun-do". In the scene of the riot in the penal colony, the backdrop for which was the closed detention center "Kresty Prison", Zhiznevsky performed all his stunts independently, despite the presence of a stunt double on the set. This scene was the very first to be filmed, and Trofim called it "One of the most difficult scenes, production-wise and technically". On the same day, the film crew's work was temporarily suspended due to a riot by local residents who interfered with the crew's work. Comedian Evgeny Chebatkov starred as the leader of a prison gang; this role became his debut in cinema. In addition, Chebatkov also participated in writing dialogues involving his character. On 8 and 11 April, for filming, the movement of transport in the area of the Mariinsky Palace was limited. This decision was agreed upon with the Legislative Assembly of Saint Petersburg, and therefore gratitude will be expressed to him in the final credits of the film.

In April 2023, Aleksei Maklakov joined the process, returning to the role of Fedor Prokopenko. At the beginning of May, the film crew went to the city of Sestroretsk to film on the territory of a non-operating plant. This time the team was joined by Olga Sutulova, Matvey Lykov, and Andrey Trushin, who played Maria Arkhipova, August van der Holt, and Otto Schreiber, respectively. Initially, instead of adding Arkhipova to the project, it was planned to return Evgeny Strelkov, played by Mikhail Evlanov, but later this idea was abandoned. On 15 May, several balloons were placed on Palace Square for filming. At that time, they were filming a scene with the collapse of the Alexander Column. To do this, the creators had to obtain permission to film from the General Director of the Hermitage Museum, Mikhail Piotrovsky. Maklakov finished filming his scenes in mid-June. During the filming of one of the scenes on the set at Ciniselli Circus, there were extras gathered from fans of the franchise. Filming ended in the summer of 2023.

== Music ==
The composer of The Plague Doctor and Grom: Boyhood, Roman Seliverstov, returned to his post to write the original music for The Game. Trofim oversaw the selection of songs for the soundtrack. The music was recorded in March–April 2024 in the music studios of the Mosfilm film concern. Sound engineer Andrey Levin and his assistant Sergey Kruglov worked together with Seliverstov. According to Gabrelyanov, when selecting songs, the creators "set themselves the bar for something like the soundtrack to the film Brother 2". The film features compositions by Sergey Shnurov, the band The Hatters, as well as such performers as Gone.Fludd, Sqwoz Bab, Slava Marlow, Antokha MC, Nick Bruskovsky, the group Sirotkin, TMNV and Aum Raa. A playlist with songs from the film was released on 17 May 2024 on Yandex Music.

== Release ==
=== Marketing ===
The first teaser of the film was shown on 15 September 2023, at the end of the presentation of the Plus Studio projects.

In May, the clothing brand Ecru, in collaboration with Bubble Studios, released a collection of clothes with prints of the film's characters. On 15 May, on the eve of the match between the football clubs Zenit and CSKA Moscow, a Fan Promenade was held at the Gazprom Arena with an autograph session for the filmmakers and a themed photo zone, and an excerpt from the film was shown on the stadium screens. On 17 May, the book service "Bookmate" released the fictional novel Major Grom: A Game of Words authored by Kirill Kutuzov, which represents the background to the film. An audio version voiced by Aleksandr Seteykin will be released in June. On 20 May, Bubble Comics released the comic Major Grom: The Game. Backstory, which is a collection of ten short stories, authored by the actors and creators of the film.

=== Theatrical ===
Major Grom: The Game premiered on 26 April 2024 - the project became the closing film of the 46th Moscow International Film Festival, which took place from 19 to 26 April.

The event was attended by producers Artyom Gabrelyanov, Michael Kitaev and Olga Filipuk, Trofim, Kotkov, production designer Dmitry Onishchenko, costume designer Anna Kudevich, makeup artist Igor Boyko and composer Roman Seliverstov. Among the actors, Lyubov Aksyonova, Matvey Lykov, Aleksandr Seteykin, Dmitry Chebotaryov, Andrey Trushkin and Evgeny Chebatkov attended the show.

Before showing it at the Moscow International Film Festival, Trofim warned viewers that the version shown there was not the final version, and asked them not to pay attention to the nuances, but to enjoy the plot. On 7 May, the Ministry of Culture of the Russian Federation issued a distribution certificate for the film. On 17 May, a special screening took place at the Formula Kino Gallery cinema in Saint Petersburg, which was attended by actors and creators. The secular premiere of the film took place on 20 May at the Karo 11 October in Moscow.

The film was released in the Russian Federation on 23 May 2024. The project distributor is the Central Partnership company. Upon completion of its distribution, The Game will be released exclusively on the KinoPoisk streaming service.

== Awards and nominations ==
The teaser trailer Last Hero was presented at the 24th Golden Trailer Awards. It was nominated in the category Best Foreign Action Trailer, but lost to the trailer of another Russian film, Guest from the Future. The Last Hero teaser trailer became the winner in the category Best Foreign Music Trailer.

The animated sequence Razumovsky's Plan was created by Petrick Animation Studio and was among the winners in the Animation category at the 2024 G8 Creative Awards, a festival of the creative industries.

== Reception ==
=== Box office ===
On the day of the premiere, the film took first place at the Russian box office, collecting 38.9 million rubles. This is significantly higher than the first film, which collected 15.6 million rubles on the first day. According to forecasts, by the end of its debut weekend, The Game had a chance to earn approximately 280 million. According to the results of the premiere weekend, The Game, although it was in first place in box office in Russia and the Commonwealth of Independent States, collected much less than expected - 162.9 million rubles. On the eve of the premiere of The Game in May 2024, Roman Isaev, a member of the board of the Association of Cinema Owners, said in an interview with the National News Service that the film should collect at least two billion rubles during its entire distribution period. This will allow it to become a "safety cushion for the summer" for cinemas after the disastrous May weekend for the Russian box office. Back in October 2023, film critic David Shneiderov (ru) suggested that The Game could succeed at the box office due to the lack of big competitors in Hollywood cinema.
