= Grom: Boyhood =

2023 Russian superhero film

- English release poster
- Directed by: Oleg Trofim
- Written by: Artyom Gabrelyanov; Evgeny Fedotov; Ekaterina Krasner
- Based on: Major Grom by: Artyom Gabrelyanov; Evgeny Fedotov
- Produced by: Artyom Gabrelyanov; Michael Kitaev; Olga Filipuk
- Starring: Kay Aleks Getts; Sergey Marin; Aleksei Vedernikov; Vladimir Yaganov; Daniil Vorobyov; Irina Rozanova
- Cinematography: Maxim Zhukov
- Edited by: Dmitry Korabelnikov
- Music by: Roman Seliverstov
- Production companies: Bubble Studios; KinoPoisk HD
- Distributed by: KinoPoisk
- Release date: 1 January 2023
- Running time: 80 minutes
- Country: Russia
- Language: Russian

Grom: Boyhood (Russian: Гром: Трудное детство) is a 2023 Russian superhero film directed by Oleg Trofim and written by Artyom Gabrelyanov, Evgeny Fedotov and Ekaterina Krasner, based on the Major Grom comic book series by Russian publisher Bubble Comics. The third film in the Bubble comic book adaptation series, a prequel to Major Grom: Plague Doctor. The plot sets in 90s and tells about the past of police major Igor Grom (Kay Aleks Getts) and the life of his father, Major Konstantin Grom (Sergey Marin).

The project was announced in December 2021, and at the same time, Trofim was appointed as the director. Principal photography took place from March to May 2022 in Saint Petersburg. Major Grom. Special premiered on 1 January 2023. The prequel received a mostly positive response from critics, praising the setting, acting, and special effects. The next movie, Major Grom: The Game, was released in 2024.

== Plot ==
The film is set in an alternate St. Petersburg of the 1990s, 20 years before the events of Major Grom: Plague Doctor. The film begins with a flashforward scene where Igor Grom, who is 12 years old in the film, returns home bloodied, after which the narration begins. Young Grom recounts the days of the '90s, while footage of newsreels of the time is shown. The next scene shows an attack by Anubis, the film's main antagonist, on one of St. Petersburg's criminal gangs to learn about the assault. Konstantin Grom, Igor's father, and his best friend and partner Fyodor Prokopenko interrogate the only surviving gangster. He does not want to say anything, and then Konstantin begins to intimidate him, almost killing him in the process, threatening even Fyodor with a gun when he tries to reason with Konstantin. It turns out that the criminal was under the influence of a certain drug.

Konstantin reports this to Elena Khmurova, the chief of police in St. Petersburg, but she urges him to drop the Anubis case and turn his attention to his own son, whom he barely sees because of his work. Later, he joins his colleagues smoking outside. Among them is Yuri Smirnov, a charismatic operative who dual wields guns. Prokopenko makes Grom apologize for his behavior during the interrogation, giving the latter 30 seconds to do so. Konstantin is very reluctant to apologize. Fyodor reminds him of his son Igor's English Language School Olympiad, after which Konstantin abruptly decides to go home.

At home, he tries to find common ground with Igor, who resents his father for not coming to his English Olympiad. Konstantin gives his son a shawarma to comfort him, and he tells his father that he won two tickets to Disneyland at school and that all that is left is to pay for the flight. Igor asks his father for money to go to Disneyland together, but he refuses, citing the family's difficult financial situation. Then Igor decides to earn money on his own; to do this, he secretly steals a bullet out of Konstantin's service pistol and shows the other boys a trick on a dare behind the garages, he wants to shoot a bullet heated over a fire into a jar of pickles without the aid of the pistol. The bullet accidentally hits the car window of a massive bandit in a crimson jacket, and Igor has to give him all the money.

Ignat, Igor's friend, suggests another way to earn money: they must help journalist Alexei Prischurov get dirt on the St. Petersburg elite, which, according to the journalist, is connected to Anubis. Although Igor is hesitant at first, the boys agree. In the evening, they go to the place designated by Anubis for the meeting of the elite, where Konstantin and Smirnov also sneak in undercover. Prischurov gives the children a video camera to document everything. Igor recognizes one of the zealots of Anubis as his father by the mark on his hand in the form of an X (the Roman numeral 10, meaning that his father must return at 10 pm), which the son left the day before with a pink marker. When the owner of a financial pyramid asks for Anubis' blessing, Konstantin tries to take the latter hostage and a firefight ensues, in which most of the villain's henchmen are killed.

Konstantin gets to Anubis, who turns out to be Elena Khmurova. In her own words, she committed all the murders to facilitate police work and to "cleanse" the city of other criminal gangs. Accordingly, all the "dark magic" was an illusion caused by the drug she sprayed on her victims. Smirnov kills Khmurova with a shot to the head and offers Konstantin to take the money stolen by the Anubis gang. He refuses and tries to shoot his partner, but he fails to do so due to the lack of a cartridge in his gun, which Igor had previously pulled out. Smirnov shoots first. Konstantin manages to strangle him and then dies himself from his bullet wounds. Igor witnesses this and from that moment on blames himself alone for his father's death.

Current time. Adult Igor, living with his girlfriend Yulia Pchyolkina after the events of the first film, has a dream in which he talks to his father and asks for forgiveness for the stolen bullet. Konstantin advises his son to let go of the past and move on. Upon awakening, Igor reads his old diary, where one of the pages has tickets to Disneyland and a photograph of his father attached to it. Igor, in a trembling voice, suggests Yulia to go to Disneyland together.

In the scene after the credits, Dr. Veniamin Rubinstein is in a therapeutic session with Sergei Razumovsky and tries to awaken his evil subpersonality. He succeeds, and Razumovsky's eyes change from blue to yellow. While subpersonality talks about his escape plans and threatens the therapist with death, Rubinstein actively and enthusiastically takes notes.

== Cast ==
- Kay Aleks Getts as Igor Grom: A young schoolboy, son of Police Major Konstantin Grom.

Getts described young Thunder as "a cheerful, perky bully. He is looking for adventures on his fifth point, loves to indulge and fool around. I like that Igor is learning to overcome himself and make difficult decisions." Tikhon Zhiznevsky, who played the role of Igor Grom in the film Major Grom: Plague Doctor, spoke positively of Getts, saying that he is "a wonderful guy, like a young, handsome [him]"

  - Tikhon Zhiznevsky as adult Igor Grom
- Sergey Marin as Police Major Konstantin Grom: Major of the Saint Petersburg Police, "an honest, uncompromising and open person, and also a loving and caring" father of Igor Grom.

Marin described Konstantin as follows: "I like the hero for his openness, which borders on rudeness. This is a person who says what he thinks without trying to cheat. Thunder Sr. loves his son, but from the outside it may seem that he does not show this love enough. He just loves the way he knows how, and his love is manifested, including in the profession. My hero is trying to make this world a better place so that there are fewer enemies around his son who can harm the boy."

- Aleksei Vedernikov as Colonel General Fedor Prokopenko in his youth: Partner and friend of Konstantin Grom.

According to Vedernikov, Aleksei Maklakov, who played the character in The Plague Doctor, "set such a bar that now I need to at least reach it. Personally, we, unfortunately, do not know each other, so I just watched his films, interviews and noticed intonation, facial expressions, gestures.

- Vladimir Yaganov as Ignat Buster: Igor Grom's best friend.

Yaganov rewatched The Plague Doctor "five or six times" to understand the character of Ignat and decide whether to add "some chips to his version, but I realized that his older version already has everything: he is cool and cheerful, values friendship and never despairs."

- Daniil Vorobyov as Yuri Smirnov: An undercover cop from Konstantin Grom's department.

Vorobyov compared his character "to Calvin Candy, the character of DiCaprio from the movie Django Unchained, if he had been in the atmosphere of Fear and Loathing in Las Vegas, but managed to get out and adapt to life in society."

- Irina Rozanova as Elena Khmurova: Tough and domineering police chief of St. Petersburg.

Rozanova took an active part in the work on the image of her heroine, "invented her character traits and appearance, so we have a lot in common with her."

- Oleg Yagodin as Alexey Prishchurov, journalist
- Anton Adasinsky as the Herald, Anubis's right-hand man
- Anton Sergeyev as Oleg Kulik
- Stanislav Baretsky as the bandit in a raspberry-red blazer (cameo appearance)
- Aleksei Takharov as Stubby Madik, bandit
- Kirill Grebenshchikov as Albert Bekhtiev, entrepreneur, one of Anubis's followers
- Igor Usachyov as the rapper
- Aleksandr Garanin as the Anubis's guard
- Daniil Molchanov as the financial pyramid worker
- Lyubov Aksyonova as Yulia Pchyolkina, Igor Grom's girlfriend
- Sergei Goroshko as Sergei Razumovsky, founder of the Vmeste social network (in mid-credits scene)
- Konstantin Khabensky as Dr. Veniamin Rubinstein, psychiatrist (in mid-credits scene)
- Alexandra Cherkasova-Sluzhitel as Sofa, Dr. Rubinstein's assistant (in mid-credits scene)
