= Exlibrium =

Russian comic book series

- Cover of the second issue (November 2014)

Publication information
- Publisher: Bubble Comics
- Schedule: Monthly
- Format: Ended
- Publication date: 20 October 2014 — 29 December 2018
- No. of issues: 50
- Main character(s): Lilia Romanova; Alexander Alinovsky; Arthur / Nightingale; Angelina Evgenievna; Inga Shelkovits; Matvey Koretsky; Kira

Creative team
- Created by: Natalia Devova
- Written by: Natalia Devova; Anna Bulatova
- Artist(s): Andrey Rodin; Alina Erofeeva; Konstantin Tarasov; Yulia Zhuravlyova; Marina Privalova

Exlibrium (Russian: Экслибриум) is an urban fantasy comic book series about the adventures of a young girl named Lilia Romanova, published by the Russian publishing house Bubble Comics. It ran from October 2014 to December 2018. The author of the comic, as well as the writer of most of the issues, was Natalia Devova. The art for the early issues was drawn by Andrey Rodin and Alina Erofeeva, and since November 2016, other artists began to work on the series: Konstantin Tarasov, Yulia Zhuravlyova and Marina Privalova.

The comics series is set in Moscow. The protagonist of the series, Lilia Romanova, a teenage girl fascinated by popular culture, accidentally enters the Order of Bookwizards. The main task of the Order is to protect the boundaries between the real world and the world of fiction. Lilia is trained in the Order, and eventually becomes a Bookwizard herself, mastering to the full her supernatural abilities: the ability to emit destructive rays from her eyes and mouth. In the Order, the girl meets other students; together they confront villains and deal with problems, mostly involving the escape of literary characters from books.

Critics received Exlibrium very favorably, welcomed the concept of the comic, including its elaborate world, the plot and the very idea of the "book magic", as well as the art of Andrei Rodin and Alina Erofeeva. However, they lamented the protractedness of the first issue's storyline and the overabundance of references to popular culture. The character of Lilia seemed ambiguous to reviewers, as some commentators noted that it would be easy for readers to associate themselves with the character, while others saw the heroine as a typical example of a "socio-phobic geek".

== Story ==
=== Setting ===
The story takes place in modern Moscow. The plot is spinning around the mysterious Order of Bookwizards, which is made by the first Bookwizards for protection of the borders between the real and the literary worlds. Their main duty is to catch literary characters who have escaped from their books and who are causing damage to the real world due to mutations of their body, caused by their presence in our objective reality. Every ordinary person can become a bookwizard, after being infected by literary ink from revived books. However, the adepts of the Order firstly need to limit the movement of a person affected by the ink, because he begins to attract the attention of "mad" books that spit out everything they have inside into the real world. Next, the infected person must pass a test in the Bone House, which is an astral place, where shadow-like creatures live. If the shadows take over, the ink absorbs the person and he becomes a Shadow of the Library (Russian: библиотень), a little phantom creature, serving the Bookwizards. The thing is that in that case he will be forgotten by anyone who ever knew him before transformation. If the person takes over, then he gains the ability to control the ink inside of him. During the test, the ink color is also being defined, which affects the supernatural abilities that the newborn Bookwizard obtains. There are ten colors in total: red, orange, yellow, green, blue, dark blue, purple, gray, black, and white (the last two are called "monochrome colors" and are special and extremely rare) and their shades. With the help of the first 8 colors, Bookwizards can influence the subjective reality of books in various ways, while black and white let their owners control our reality, opening up perspectives to limitless possibilities (the abilities of both can only be used together with the opposite color, which means that two magicians are required to activate them; they can't be used separately). That's why the Order of Bookwizards is haunting after magicians of monochrome colors, whose fate in case of capture is death.

The Order of Bookwizards owns Libraries, which are headquarters, as well as training places for new magicians. In one of those Libraries, the Real Moscow Library, the most of Exlibrium's story takes place. Every Library has its manager, who is similar to the school principal, and tutors. All Libraries obey the council of the Order, called the Circle. The Circle includes four people and an equal number of senior Shadows of the Library (a special kind, more intelligent and powerful than their smaller colleagues). Together, the participants of the Circle solve global problems of the Libraries crisis.

=== History ===
The first story arc ...And The Door Will Open is about how the main character Lilia Romanova gets into the Order of Bookwizards. On the Order's instructions, two of its magicians - an ordinary Bookwizard, Alexander Alinovsky, along with a revived artificial character, Arthur, - pursue Little Red Riding Hood and the Wolf, who have escaped from the book, in an attempt to bring them back. On her way, Little Red Riding Hood bumps into a girl who was going to preparatory classes at the institute, Lilia, who unwillingly finds herself in the center of the story. Alexander and Arthur arrive just in time to save the girl from the Wolf, who already managed to eat Little Red Riding Hood and her Grandmother, who also got into our reality. Together they stopped the violent literary character and bring the fugitives back to their book.

Afterwards, Lilia had to go through the process of "closing", a ritual dedicated to removing the ink from the human's body, because of which books begin to attract to him (Bonehouse story arc). During the ritual, she gets into another reality, where a house of bones appears before her. Suddenly she is attacked by her own shadow. In the end, she managed to become conscious and remove the ink from her body. After that, Angelina Evgenievna, the head of Moscow Library (one of the headquarters of the Order), offers Lilia to study in the Order of Bookwizards, and the girl agrees.

Further Lilia participates in a task for the first time, catching the escaped characters of books, learns details of studying and working in the Order, and finds out that Shadows of the Library, harmless at the first sight, assistants of Bookwizards - were people that just didn't succeed in initiation of the Bone House (With Good Intentions story arc). Later, in the Among The Three Flames arc students of the Order help members of the Magic Emergency Committee to track down an unknown person in hood, who used the Hummer of Witches, the ancient and powerful folio, while attacking the headquarters of a friendly organization. After a fight with the ominous spirit of the inquisitor, trapped inside the book, Bookwizards get together for the trial of the earlier escaped characters of the book. Although Bookwizards managed to find out the information they were interested in, one of the characters became to transform due to a long stay outside of his book, and Yakov, one of the members of the Circle, eventually had to kill the mutant (The Trial arc).

The violent murder leaves an imprint on Lily's mind, and, to calm the girl down and explain how the things go, Alexander decides to tell her a sad story that happened to him six months ago (Insult To Injury arc). On New Years' Eve he bumped into the unusual character - a female warrior Agatha. She often left her book, understanding, that she is the character inside of it, just to walk around in another world. At first, Alex warned Agatha, explaining the need of returning her into the book and sealing it, due to what all her memories would vanish. The girl agreed, however, imbued with respect and sympathy for the character, who has to live her death in the book all over again and again, Alex tried to help her stay in the real world. The situation got out of control: woman started to mutate, and the attempt to return her into the story failed - the rest of the characters, also mutated, began to get out into the real world. At the end of everything, the invasion was stopped, but a friend of Alex died, as well as many others Bookwizards.

Except for the main story, the secondary one exists. It tells us about Kira, the wizard of monochrome and the owner of black ink; Nikita, the bookwizard with red ink; Lisa, a non-wizard, ordinary person; her uncle Nicolas; the other version of the book character Agatha and the bookwizard Vladimir, who killed Kira's brother Kai (Mono arc). The story begins with Nikita and Lisa, successfully finding and capturing Vladimir, delivering him to Nicolas' and Kira's house afterwards, and locking him there. As it turns out, Vladimir has been tracking and eliminating monochrome magicians; one of his victims was Kira's brother, Kai. As a prisoner, Vladimir was being interrogated in attempt to find out where he put white ink, that once belonged to Kai. After multiply unsuccessful attempts to get the truth out, Kira comes up with a plan to write a book that will allow her to sneak into Vladimir's memory. They were able to get inside of the story, and while Kira travels through Vladimir's memory, the characters of the book slowly begin to mutate. As soon as the needed information was revealed, Kira and her companions hurriedly quit the mutated story. As it turns out, Vladimir could transfer Kai's color to young Lilia Romanova, since he used to be her mentor (The Innocent Story arc).

These two storylines intersect farther, in the end of the series in the arcs The Fairy Tale Is Over, The Revolt, The Comeback, The Light Strip. After learning that Lilia can potentially be the owner of the white ink, Nikita and Lisa set up a trap, that, as a result, captured other Bookwizards. After a short fight, Bookwizards and Nikita die, and Lisa was the only one who stayed alive. Therefore, Kira decides to go another way - she breaks into the building of the Real Moscow Library, captivates all the Bookwizards and The Circle's heads, and arranges her own trial. It turns out that the famous Bone House is nothing else but the society of the Ancient Wizards - the first known Bookwizards ever. They needed energy of the ink, that is captured inside of infected people, to maintain their power, whereas Kira and Kai were used by Wizards to achieve the goal, because they could have a certain effect on people to get the desired ink color. Vladimir, who has been hunting Kira and gave Kai's ink color to Lilia, allied with Angelina Evgenievna. She set up Lilia's entry into the Order of Bookwizards to have the owner of white ink near herself. According to their plan, after the finding of the black ink, Vladimir and Angelina would use the power of monochrome to break out of the Circle's control. When everything becomes clear, Kira asks Lilia for help in destroying the Bone House, due to what everybody will lose their ink and superpowers. Lilia agrees and voluntarily gives Kira her white ink. Having accomplished what she started, Kira was attacked by Agatha. Agatha kills Kira and takes her ink among with superpowers. Since all the heroes with colored ink lost their abilities, the only one who retained superpowers, was Agatha. She appears before the ex-Bookwizards and announces that now she will be taking revenge on people for all the bad times that literary characters had to go through because of them.

=== Main characters ===
- Lilia Romanova — the main character of the series, a pop-culture lover in every its manifestation. Studies in her first year with Alexander, Inga, and Matvey. Due to her parents' frequent moves from city to city, little girl didn't have a lot of friends, which strongly affected her social skills, and also became a basis for numerous complexes and obsessive-compulsive disorder. Even though at times she can fall into depression and close up, she is quite a brave girl and would not leave her friends in trouble. The color of her ink is yellow, which allows her to emit destructive rays from her eyes and mouth.
- Alexander Alinovsky — one of the students of the Real Moscow Library and one of the first Bookwizards that Lilia meet. Gloomy and reasonable. Before he stood out among others students with a skeptical attitude towards the foundations of the Order of Bookwizards; in the end, a tragedy that took the lives of many magicians, happened because of his skepticism, which made him honor and follow established rules more than others. Grey is the color of his ink, which allows him to control stone.
- Inga Shelkovits — a student of the Real Moscow Library. She was infected with the ink at the same time that Alexander did, so they got into the Order together. Kind, but harsh sometimes with her friends, when they don't believe in themselves. She is hyperactive, which refers to her superpower to move with high speed, thanks to her blue ink color.
- Matvey Koretsky — another student of the Real Moscow Library. Quite a detached person, very sarcastic, always says whatever is on his mind, due to what earned a reputation among students as a troublesome carefree young man. His ink color is also blue, but he uses his abilities differently – instead of high speed, he uses the magic of the ink to fly.
- Arthur (also known as Nightingale) — a teacher in the Real Moscow Library. A literary character of a book, written and brought to life by Angelina Evgenievna, when she was a little girl. He's the only wizard of the Order of Bookwizards who is a revived character and is an exception from the rules, regarding characters. He is very kind-hearted even to his enemies, optimistic and careless, which sometimes causes an erroneous impression of his naivety. Has a habit of wearing flip-flops on bare feet. Being a literary character, he doesn't need food and water, doesn't experience pain, can regenerate.
- Angelina Evgenievna — the head of the Real Moscow Library; for students she is sort of a principal of the school. She wrote a book about Arthur when she was 9. Strict, but fair. She worries about her students a lot every time they are on a deadly mission and often helps them to get out of a difficult situation. Tries to quit smoking. Has the ability to teleport to the current location of the Bookwizard or character, using a drop of his ink. The ink color and superpower abilities are unknown.
- Kira — the main character of the parallel story. She is the only living wizard of monochrome, that uses the magic of black ink, which allows her to change the objective reality. Her goal is to find white ink that her dead brother Kai used to have.

== Development ==
=== Creative team ===
Speaking of how the series has changed, I can say, that I, apparently, didn't gave the editorial office the thing they wanted from me, the light-hearted, funny story in urban fantasy setting, just because I can't keep writing that constantly. Regularly I imagine some cruel things, because they make my imagination work. Exlibrium started like that, "Nata, please, write us a kind, adventurous story", and I replied, "Okay". And I could hold on 'till the second issue (laughing). And after that the mutilations started, and, "what can be even more uniting, than unintentional double murder"? I don't know how bad is that, Exlibrium has its own fan community, that is very tolerant to everything that I do to the series (and I'm very thankful for that). I suppose that the comics became a little bit different from the one that we planned, but I can't say that it's a bad thing either.

— Natalia Devova about the changes of the series during the publishing time

In 2014 Russian publishing house Bubble Comics, which has been already publishing four original comic series by that time, decided release two new series, so they announced Exlibrium and Meteora. The publishing house couldn't decide on the name of the series for a very long time. As the editor-in-chief of Bubble, Roman Kotkov, wrote in one of the collections of issues of Exlibrium, originally it was called Exlibris, but it had to be abandoned since this name had already been registered. Other options ranged from Bookwizards to Fleur de Lis. Eventually. the name "Exlibrium" was approved, the idea by Denis Popov, Bubble's designer. Exlibrium's name is a blend word from Latin "ex libris" ("out of the books") and English "equilibrium". The creators' comments on the original direction of the comic differ. Natalia Devova claims that at first series supposed to be comics for the females as a target audience; according to the statement of the CEO of Bubble, Artyom Gabrelyanov, it was assumed that there would be both female and male main characters, as a 'student and mentor', but, to increase the number of central female characters in the publisher's lines, it was decided to focus on Lilia and to give another character a secondary role.

The work on Exlibrium was entrusted to the writer Natalia Devova and the artist Andrey Rodin. At that time Natalia Devova had already been working on the plot for another publisher's comic book series Friar for two years, starting with the crossover Friar vs Demonslayer. According to her, initially, the scripts had to be written according to synopses: 'they were giving me a brief retelling of the chapter and I was writing it into a complete script'. As time flew by, the publisher provided Devova with more and more creative freedom, which, ultimately, lead to the creation of her series. According to Artem Gabrelianov, he was the one, who came up with the idea of Exlibrium, but it developed into the complete series under the hard work of Natalia Devova and another writer, Evgeny Fedotov. Choosing Andrey Rodin as an artist for the series was Devova's decision, who begged for a chance to work with him only.

=== Character design ===
During the elaboration and creation process, some characters underwent strong changes. So, Lilia herself, was originally blonde and her name was Kate Odintsova, and her wardrobe would have consisted of casual clothes and accessories from her favorite video games. Despite the cardinal changes in Lilia's appearance, she still represented a geek girl, a pacifist, far from violence. The main features of her new appearance were thick eyebrows, long and sharp nose, and black eyes. Devova also planned to add a gap between the girl's front teeth, but her colleagues told her out of it. The selection of hairstyle caused difficulties – since two female characters, Red Fury and Meteora, already had long hair, Devova decided to focus on short and semi-long straight hair, but none of the options were approved by Andrey Rodin. According to Devova, the final option was suggested by Anastasia Kim, the main artist of Major Grom. The clothes of the character remained just like the author wanted them to be in the first place — a blouse with print on sleeves, high-waisted jeans, and a black hat.

Alexander and Arthur initially had the more classic style of clothing, consisting of jackets, strict suits, but later it was changed to more modern and casual. Changes in appearance affected Alexander in a lesser extent. His wardrobe was mostly filled with black clothes, unlike Arthur's lighter-colored clothes. Andrey Rodin, guided by the description, given to him by Natalia Devova ("Alexander's eccentric and bright partner") made Arthur a man of about middle age, with facial hair, with hair, smoothed back and gathered in a ponytail, before the character ended up in his final appearance (blonde hair, tall and slim build). Angelina Evgenievna's appearance was approved with the very first sketches. When Roman Kotkov saw them, he compared the character with American actress Jessica Lange, famous for her role in American Horror Story. At first, Devova insisted on a short hairstyle, but her colleagues denied her request, and the character had curly hair of medium length, however, in 25 issue she appears with short hair anyway.

=== Publication ===
Exlibrium (along with Meteora, the other comic book series by Bubble) was presented for the first time on Comic-Con Russia in October 2014. The first issue came out 20 October of the same year; the following issues usually were also dated on the twentieth, but there were exceptions, as long as some were published a few days earlier than usual, while others a few days later. In addition, issues, usually dedicated to some festivals or being exclusive to some comic book stores, had an additional circulation with an alternative cover. The fourth issue was the only one of the series, where two plots were presented simultaneously – the continual of ...And The Door Will Open and a single about Alexander and Arthur. Issues 14-17 were included in the plot of the crossover The Time of the Raven, but the characters of Exlibrium weren't presented in the series itself. 34 issue was published in the unusual, landscaped format – the comic book was printed horizontally, across the page. On the 28th of October, 2015 the first issue of Exlibrium was published on American online comic distribution company ComiXology. Till the present time, 13 issues had been already translated and published in English.

On the 1st of October, 2015 the first volume was released, consisting the first five issues. Subsequently, other issues were also published as a part of collections. Each volume received a reprint with an alternative cover. In addition to the comics themselves, additional materials were included in the publications: comments from the creators, sketches of frames and characters, locations, cover sketches, and other, unused versions. In 2015 Cosmodrome Games even made a card game based on Exlibrium. In May 2016, Bubble Comics initiated a crowdfunding campaign on the Kickstarter platform to raise funds for the release of the printed collection in English. It was planned to gain 10.000 USD, in the end, they were able to gain twice more – 24.554 USD. The collection includes 1-8 issues and an additional story, created exclusively for the English edition. In December 2018, along with the release of the 50th-anniversary issue, the publisher announced that they are shutting down the series. On the 21st of April 2019 a one-shot spin-off 'Exlibrium. The Blank Sheet' was released. It tells a background story of some of the secondary characters. A pilot issue of a sequel Exlibrium: Second Life was presented on Comic-Con Russia in October 2019. At the beginning of August 2021, the second spin-off, Exlibrium: Red Line, was released, also dedicated to the background of secondary characters of the series. The action of Red Line happens before the actions of Second Life.

== Reception ==
Critics gave Exlibrium mostly positive reviews. Comics was praised mainly for its original idea and interesting plot, the series itself was repeatedly called the best work by Bubble Comics. A well-developed fictional world, charismatic characters, and a pleasant drawing also stood out among other advantages. However, critics weren't so sure about the main character, Lilia Romanova. She was called a simple character, with whom a reader will easily associate himself, and, on the other hand, a typical example of a "sociophobic geek". Disadvantages included the length of the first introductory plot and excess of pop-culture references.

Alexander Strepetilov, a reviewer of the magazine Mir Fantastiki called Exlibrium the most original series by Bubble Comics and suggested that the comics will be liked more by fans of Harry Potter or Doctor Strange than to the fans of ordinary superhero comics. Among the disadvantages, Strepetilov underlined an excess of references and the long duration of the first, introductory plot. A reviewer of the website Geek-Freak.Ru praised comics for a well-developed fictional world, charismatic characters, and a pleasant drawing. The quality of action was also praised, but the reviewed noted that there is not enough of it. Pavel Borchenko from Geekster praised comics for the same things, noting the detailed elaboration of the character of the main character, as close as possible to the behavior of peers in a real situation: she reacts the same way as a reader would if they were in Lilia's place. Evgeny Eronin, representing the website SpiderMedia.ru, had the same opinion; at the same time, a reviewer from Redrumers, on the opposite, told that the main character didn't cause any positive emotions – author of the review noted banality of her "geek" behavior, and it pushed him away. Alexander Talashin from Meownauts praised authors of comics for originality, but warned them, that borrowing characters from others' work may cause accusations of cliche. He also pointed out well-development characters and good drawings by Andrey Rodin, but criticized Lilia, calling her "a closed and crazy person, who couldn't be found even in our time". All in all, comics were called nice, and Talashin was confident that the following issues will become better.

Comics were also rated by some foreign reviewers. Karrie McClaine, representing BlackNerdProblems.com, in her review for two first issues, reacted positively to the multiple pop-culture references, drawing, interesting creatures, characters, and setting of Exlibrium; eventually, the first issue got 8,5 points out of 10, and the second one - 9,5. A reviewer from ComicBastards.com noted the availability to the understanding of the comic book by the American audience. It has nothing foreign to American reality, and, if it wasn't mentioned that action takes place in Russia, it's almost impossible to guess that they don't take place in America; the weak connection between the introductory text and the plot itself was negatively evaluated; author contrasted the comics with Star Wars, where, without an introductory part, the setting is understandable after first five minutes of reading, whereas, in case of Exlibrium, the story will be perceived completely differently without an introduction.

=== Awards ===
Exlibrium was nominated in the category "The best original comic series" in ComicsBoom.net every year since 2014 till 2017. Comics won in its nomination two years in a row (in 2014 it took the prize along with two other Bubble series Friar and Meteora), however, according to the results in 2016, it received a second place (the first one was taken by Pantheon: The Cult Of Duplicity). At different times the line was voted for by Evgeny Eronin (the editor-in-chief of SpiderMedia.ru), Stanislav Kuprianov (admin of ComicsTrade.ru website), Dmitry Zlotnitsky (reviewer of Mir Fantastiki magazine), Yury Kolomensky (author of SpiderMedia.ru website), Maria Krutova (author of Meownats website), Konstantin Buyanov (editor of Geekster.ru), Daniil Popov (author of ComicsBoom.net) and Maxim Usenko (author of ComicBoom.net). Members of the jury came to a common opinion, according to which Exlibrium represents the most original series by Bubble Comics, and is an indicator of the gradual growth of the quality of the publisher's comics.

| Year | Award | Category | Result |
|---|---|---|---|
| 2014 | ComicsBoom Awards | The Best Original Comics Series | Winner |
| 2015 | ComicsBoom Awards | The Best Original Comics Series | Winner |
| 2016 | ComicsBoom Awards | The Best Original Comics Series | Nominated |

== Bibliography ==
=== Volumes ===
==== In Russian ====
- Devova, Natalia. …And The Door Will Open. — Bubble Comics, 2015. — Vol. 1 (№ 1—5). — 206 p. — (Exlibrium). — ISBN 978-5-9907068-1-1.
- Devova, Natalia. The Bone House. — Bubble Comics, 2016. — Vol. 2 (№ 6—10). — 204 p. — (Exlibrium). — ISBN 978-5-9907605-1-6.
- Kotkov, Roman; Devova, Natalia. Among The Three Flames. — Bubble Comics, 2016. — Vol. 3 (№ 11—17). — 264 p. — (Exlibrium). — ISBN 978-5-9908270-5-9.
- Devova, Natalia. Insult to Injury. — Bubble Comics, 2017. — Vol. 4 (№ 18—23). — 220 p. — (Exlibrium). — ISBN 978-5-9908710-0-7.
- Devova, Natalia. Here's The House, Where…. — Bubble Comics, 2017. — Vol. 5 (№ 24—29). — 206 p. — (Exlibrium). — ISBN 978-5-9500084-4-3.
- Devova, Natalia. Paper Cut. — Bubble Comics, 2018. — Vol. 6 (№ 30—34). — 170 p. — (Exlibrium). — ISBN 978-5-9500621-0-0.
- Bulatova, Anne; Devova, Natalia. The Fairytale Is Over. — Bubble Comics, 2018. — Vol. 7 (№ 35—40). — 202 p. — (Exlibrium). — ISBN 978-5-6041510-7-5.
- Devova, Natalia. The Revolt. — Bubble Comics, 2019. — Vol. 8 (№ 41—45). — 156 p. — (Exlibrium). — ISBN 978-5-6041511-8-1.
- Devova, Natalia. The Light Strip. — Bubble Comics, 2019. — Vol. 9 (№ 46—50). — 212 p. — (Exlibrium). — ISBN 978-5-6042724-3-5.

==== In English ====
- Devova, Natalia. …And The Door Will Open. — Bubble Comics, 2016. — Vol. 1 (№ 1—8). — 264 p. — (Exlibrium). — ISBN 978-5-9908270-2-8.
