= Moscow Racer =

2009 video game

- Developer: iRS Games Studio
- Publisher: Akella
- Producer: Alexey Cardo
- Platform: Windows
- Release: April 2009
- Genre: Racing
- Mode: Single-player

Moscow Racer is a simulation racing video game developed by iRS Games Studio and published by Akella that is set in Moscow at street level. It was released exclusively in Russia in April 2009.

The game received the “Debut of the Year 2008” award at the Russian Game Developers' Conference and placed in the top 10 best-selling videogames in Russia for several months, though the game received generally poor to average reviews.

The game is a Windows exclusive and was developed and published by Moscow-based companies.

== Announcement ==
The game was announced in October 2007 alongside a video trailer and an early technical demo release.

In the game's first press-release, Alexey Cardo, the game's producer, stated "We completely understand that we won't make an absolutely top-level game from the very first step ... What we are going to do is to create a series of good and dynamic racing games." and elaborated that after several further installations in the series, the company would produce "products of world-best quality".

Pre-release versions of Moscow Racer were shown at a number of public events, including the 2008 E3 Expo.

== Expos ==
Moscow Racer was previewed at the following automotive and videogame events before its release:

1. Game Developers Conference Russia, April 2008

2. Tuning Days, May 2008

3. Super Car & Bike Show, May 2008

5. Arena Drive Festival, June 2008

6. AutoExotica, July 2008

7. Moscow International Auto Show, August 2008

== Release, reception and sales ==
Moscow Racer was released in Russia in April 2009, about a year later than expected, and received generally poor to average ratings from critics, ranging from 3.2/10 to 7.3/10. The game was not released outside of Russia.

The game remained in Akella's top 10 bestsellers for five months after its release (April 2009 to August 2009), hovering between 8th and 10th place.

Moscow Racer reached the top 10 in sales with the following Russian distributors:

- SOYUZ: 4th place (sales charts from April 20, 2009)
- Nastroeniye: 6th place (sales charts from May 21, 2009)
- Hit-Zona: 6th place (sales charts from May 21, 2009)

== Successors ==
Rally Raid 2009: Road to Dakar (unreleased)

In July 2008, iRS Games announced another racing game that focused on KAMAZ rally trucks and the Dakar Rally. It was announced that the game would be "a simulator of racing through African continent, developed to support the KAMAZ rally team". As of August 2026, the game has not been published and no updates regarding the game's presumed cancellation have been given to the general public.

Moscow Racer: Auto Legends of the USSR

In December 2010, iRS Studio and Akella released a remake of the original game that focused on soviet cars from the 1940s to the 1970s.
