= Aleksandr Varlamov =

Aleksandr Varlamov, Alexandre Varlamov or Alexandr Varlamov may refer to:

- Aleksandr Varlamov (composer, born 1801) (1801–1848), Russian composer, singer and conductor
- Aleksandr Varlamov (composer, born 1904) (1904–1990), Russian Soviet jazz composer and arranger
- Aleksandr Varlamov (diver) (born 1979), Russian diver
