= Major Grom (2017 film) =

Russian short film

- Official poster
- Directed by: Vladimir Besedin
- Written by: Artyom Gabrelyanov; Vladimir Besedin
- Based on: Major Grom by Artyom Gabrelyanov; Jevgénij Fyedotov
- Produced by: Vladimir Besedin; Fyodor Kan; Artyom Gabrelyanov
- Starring: Aleksander Gorbatov; Ivan Fominov; Anton Kuznetsov; Ilya Zhinilo; Danila Yakushev
- Cinematography: Arseny Kan
- Edited by: Aleksandr Bulygin
- Music by: Roman Seliverstov
- Production company: Bubble Studios
- Distributed by: Channel One Russia
- Release dates: 11 February 2017 (Berlin Film Festival); 19 February 2017 (YouTube)
- Running time: 29 minutes
- Country: Russia
- Language: Russian

Major Grom (Russian: Майор Гром, romanized: Mayor Grom) is a 2017 Russian short action film directed by Vladimir Besedin, based on the comic character Major Grom.

Plans to make a film were announced at Comic-Con Russia in October 2015, when Bubble Comics announced the creation of its own film division, Bubble Studios. The script was completed on 23 February 2016. The filming process began in mid-August in Saint Petersburg and continued until 28 August 2016.

The short film had its world premiere at the Berlin International Film Festival on 11 February 2017 as test footage for a full-length film production, to be released in 2018. It later became available for general public viewing on 21 February 2017 through Bubble Comics' YouTube channel and on the site Life.ru, the latter gaining more than 1.7 million views on the first day of the film's release there. On 9 March 2017, it was screened on the Russian television station Channel One. On 21 July 2017, the short film was screened during San Diego Comic-Con and included a Q&A session with its creators—Vladimir Besedin, Artyom Gabrelyanov, and Roman Kotkov.

The story is about a major in the MVD of St. Petersburg, Igor Grom, who tries to stop the robbery of a bank, save the hostages, and arrest a gang of three bandits hiding their identity under the masks of characters from the Soviet cartoon Puck! Puck!.

== Plot ==
Three armed men, dressed in red sports suits and disguised as villainous hockey players from the popular Soviet cartoon Puck! Puck!, break into a bank in St Petersburg. They intimidate visitors and try to find the manager in order to obtain the keys to the bank safe. Unable to find him, the leader of the gang grabs a little girl and threatens to shoot her if the manager does not come to him in a few seconds. As a result, a man appears from the opposite side of the room, claiming to be the manager and wearing the manager's badge. The leader sends another member of the gang, nicknamed "Psycho", with the "manager" to the safe. They approach the door, and the man opens it. The bandit first roars in anger, not seeing a mountain of money in front of him, but later finds the money inside a separate depository for cash savings and gold. In his euphoria, the robber begins feverishly putting everything into a cart. He eventually notices that the manager's face does not match the photo on his badge. Having been exposed, the man attacks the robber and knocks him out.

Nervous because of the long absence of "Psycho", the gang leader sends the third member of the gang, "Buster", to see what is happening. "Buster" finds "Psycho" unconscious on the floor inside the safe room and tries to revive him, when the false manager appears from the shadows, subduing him. The mysterious man comes out of the vault and meets a bank guard. He introduces himself as Igor Grom, police major.

The film flashes back to the beginning of the robbery, showing Grom trying to withdraw money from an ATM, which takes away his credit card and goes out of order. While the robbers take visitors hostage and search for a manager, Grom calculates possible options for neutralizing the criminal gang, but realizes that an open confrontation with armed robbers would end badly either for himself or for some of the hostages. At this time, he notices the real bank manager creeping away and decides to impersonate him, taking his clothes and badge. After that, the action returns to the present time. The gang leader is trying to hide his panic as the situation spirals out of his control. Suddenly, a cart with the disarmed "Psycho" and "Buster" rolls up to him, and Major Grom emerges. The furious leader shoots at him with multiple weapons, but Grom manages to hide behind a wall near the same ATM he was using before, which conveniently returns his credit card. The robber continues to fire until he runs out of ammunition, then decides to retreat with the money he has been able to steal. Grom chases after him.

The gang leader jumps into a getaway car, which drives off just as Grom exits the bank. Arriving at an intersection, the car is smashed by a garbage truck. The driver is badly injured, but the leader manages to climb out and begins to run. Grom catches up to him, and the two begin to fight. Grom is overpowered, however, and the criminal runs up the stairs to the top of a building under construction. Grom gains on him by climbing onto the statue of Poseidon and jumping to the third floor. After an extended chase, the villain is apprehended.

Grom is celebrated on television for foiling the robbery.

Before the credits roll, a brief scene shows the Plague Doctor—Major Grom's nemesis from the comic series—lighting a match and throwing it to the ground, after which a bright flame flares up, creating a segue to the events of the full-length film.

== Cast ==
- Aleksander Gorbatov as Igor Grom
- Ivan Fominov as Gang leader
- Anton Kuznetsov as Psycho
- Oisel More Despaigne as Buster
- Danila Yakushev as Vodila
- Anatoly Koshcheyev as guard
- Vitaly Alshansky as bank manager
- Yekaterina Kulikova as mother
- Ulyana Kulikova as daughter
- Olga Dibtseva as cashier
- Mariya Ulyanova as cashier
- Pyotr Selkin as cashier
- Evgeniya Shcherbakova as Anna Terebkina
- Arseniy Kozhemyakin as honor guard
- Andrey Ankudinov as honor guard
- Ilya Lovkiy as police officer
- Pavel Goncharov as police officer
- Yevgeniy Dyadyuk as police officer
- Ilya Koletsky as police officer
- Anatoly Sveshnikov as police officer
- Pyotr Logachev as police officer
- Leonid Voron as general
- Sergey Korenkov as a colleague of Grom
- Ruslan Katsagadzhiev as a colleague of Grom

== Production ==
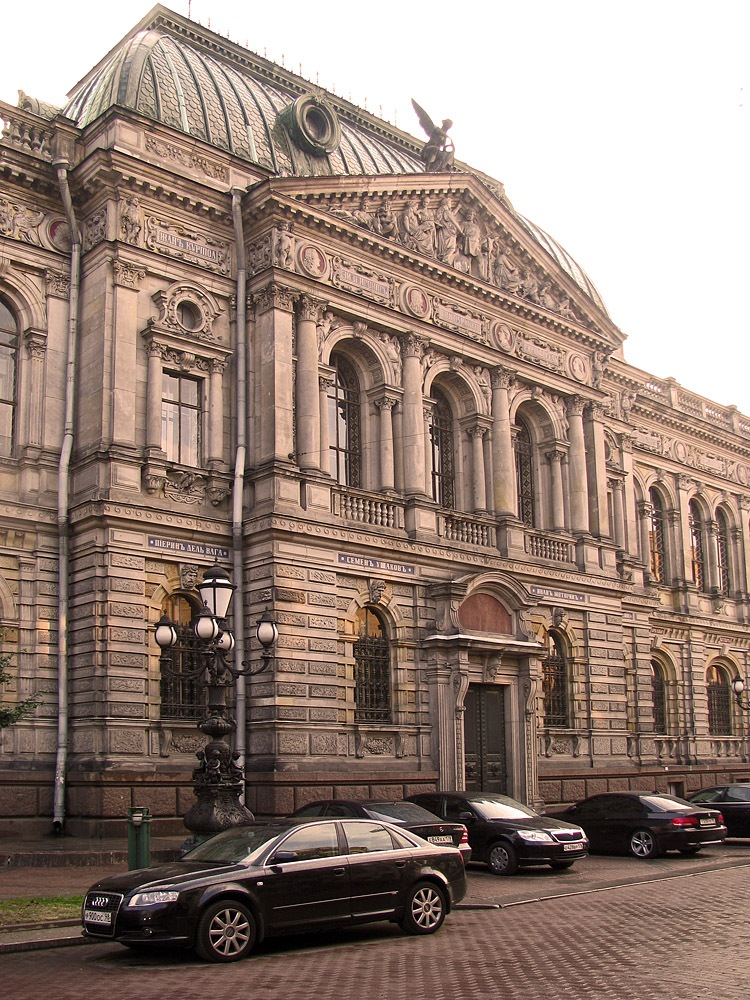
The building of the Saint Petersburg Art and Industry Academy, which was used for the bank building

The role of Igor Grom was also offered to actor Grigory Dobrygin. In the beginning, the original version ran at approximately 7 minutes, but in the production process, it became clear that the script had become too long, increasing the runtime to 25 minutes.

For the fight scenes in the bank, a special filming technique was developed, in which filming was done at 360-degree shots, previously not used either in Russia or in the rest of the world. The film takes place in the Rosgarantbank branch, a fictional bank from the Major Grom comic book universe.

The entire interior of the bank was built from the ground up: everything from the racks and cabinets, to ATMs, design letterhead, and bank cards. The total amount of money created to fill the bank vault exceeded $5 million.

The five-meter statue of Poseidon in an abandoned hotel was manufactured and installed specifically for the film. In order to shoot the car chase scenes, the producers blocked the whole block in the city center, and alternative routes for public traffic were developed. Specifically for the film, the production team redesigned the look of the Russian police and developed a new, unique service uniform, cars, and equipment.

A prequel comic book, called Major Grom: The Chance, was published.

== Music ==
The score was composed by Roman Seliverstov.
