= Bubble Comics =

Russian comic book publisher

- Status: Active
- Founded: September 2011
- Founder: Artyom Gabrelyanov
- Country of origin: Russia
- Headquarters location: Moscow
- Key people: Roman Kotkov, editor-in-chief; Evgeniy Fedotov, writer; Anastasia Kim, artist; Natalia Zaidova, artist; Andrey Vasin, artist
- Fiction genres: Superheroes
- Official website: bubblecomics.com

Bubble Comics (Russian: Издательство BUBBLE) is the largest Russian comic book publisher, founded in 2011. It is the only publishing house in Russia that produces original non-franchised comic books. Its early slate consisted of four titles: Demonslayer, Major Grom, Friar, and Red Fury. These were later joined by Exlibrium and Meteora. The original four titles concluded their run in December 2016 at fifty issues each. In January 2017, four new ongoing series were launched in their place: Allies, Demonslayer vol. 2, Igor Grom, and Realmwalkers.

== History ==
=== Bubble magazine ===
Bubble Comics was founded in 2011 by journalist Artyom Gabrelyanov as part of News Media, a company owned by his father, media mogul Aram Gabrelyanov. Initially it published the eponymous Bubble magazine with collections of satirical comics, such as Bruce UnMighty, Dick Adequate, HastarbAnime, and Mister Policeman.

The magazine did not gain much popularity and was published for less than a year. Over time, Artyom Gabrelyanov decided that the publishing house should abandon humorous comics in favor of adventure and superhero ones.

=== Superhero comics ===
In October 2012, the publisher started releasing four ongoing monthly series: Major Grom, Demonslayer, Friar, and Red Fury. In October 2014, at the very first Comic-Con Russia in Moscow, Bubble Comics announced two new series—Exlibrium and Meteora. First issues of each came out the same month. In the period between December 2013 and February 2014, the first crossover between the Bubble Comics lines was published: a joint story arc of Friar and Demonslayer was released under the title Friar against Demonslayer.

In 2014, two action figures of Red Fury characters were released. In October, BUBBLE Comics became a partner in the first Comic-Con Russia festival.

In October 2015, English-language versions of BUBBLE's comics started appearing on the comiXology platform.

In May 2016, BUBBLE launched a Kickstarter campaign to publish the English-language hardcover edition of Exlibrium. The project was successfully funded, raising $24,554 in total—almost two-and-a-half times more than their initial goal of $10,000.

=== BUBBLE Studios ===
In October 2015, BUBBLE Comics announced the establishment of a film production department, BUBBLE Studios, responsible for adapting their comics to movies. Vladimir Besedin was named head of the department. Shortly after, BUBBLE Studios began work on its first project, the short film Major Grom, intended as a pilot project before making a full-length film. The trailer for the short was released in October 2016. The film, directed by Vladimir Besedin, premiered on 21 February 2017 on BUBBLE's YouTube channel and by the end of its first day, it had more than 1.7 million views. Soon after, BUBBLE Studios began developing the feature film Major Grom: Plague Doctor. The production, based on the bestselling comic Major Grom, was released in April 2021. It was made available on the Netflix streaming platform on 7 July 2021.

=== Films ===
Partial source:

Title	Release date	Director(s)	Screenwriter(s)	Producer(s)	Budget	Box office
Major Grom	19 February 2017	Vladimir Besedin	Vladimir Besedin & Artyom Gabrelyanov	Vladimir Besedin, Artyom Gabrelyanov, Fyodor Kan	–	–
Major Grom: Plague Doctor	1 April 2021	Oleg Trofim	Artyom Gabrelyanov, Roman Kotkov, Evgeniy Eronin, Vladimir Besedin, Aleksandr Kim, Valentina Tronova, Nikolay Titov	Artyom Gabrelyanov, Roman Kotkov, Evgeniy Eronin, Michael Kitaev, Olga Filipuk	₽640 million	₽317 million
Grom: Boyhood	1 January 2023	Oleg Trofim	Artyom Gabrelyanov, Evgeniy Eronin, Ekaterina Krasner	Artyom Gabrelyanov, Michael Kitaev, Olga Filipuk	–	–
Major Grom: The Game	23 May 2024	Oleg Trofim	Artyom Gabrelyanov, Evgeniy Eronin, Roman Kotkov, Oleg Trofim, Ekaterina Krasner, Evgeniy Chebatkov, Nikolay Shishkin	Artyom Gabrelyanov, Michael Kitaev, Olga Filipuk, Roman Kotkov, Evgeny Eronin, Denis Popov	₽871 million	₽577 million
Upcoming
Demonslayer	2026	TBA	TBA	TBA	TBA	TBA
Major Grom 3	2027	TBA	TBA	TBA	TBA	TBA
Demonslayer 2	2028	TBA	TBA	TBA	TBA	TBA
Time of the Raven	2029	TBA	TBA	TBA	TBA	TBA

=== Television ===
Partial source:

Series	Season	Episodes	Originally released		Status
Series	Season	Episodes	First released	Last released	Status
Major Grom: Game Against the Rules	1	6	19 January 2026	TBA	In production
Fury	1	TBA	2026	TBA	In production
Realmwalkers	1	TBA	2027	TBA	In production
Exlibrium	1	TBA	2028	TBA	In production

=== Other projects ===
Bubble Comics has collaborated with the Soyuzmultfilm animation studio. The two companies have been working together on several projects, one of which is the animated show Coolix, based on the eponymous series of children's comics about superhero animals, published by Bubble in 2017–2018. The series, planned in 2D format and intended for children ages 6–8, was set to premiere in September 2021, with the intention of producing 26 episodes, each 11 minutes long.

"Soyuzmultfilm always has been an experimental studio, and nowadays we are open to various formats of cooperation that allow us to create bright, relevant projects <...> Interaction with Bubble Comics has posed us a number of interesting tasks that are associated with moving comic book heroes onto screens and vice versa—this is a completely new precedent for Russian animation in general".

Additionally, a series of comics about the characters from the "golden collection" of Soviet cartoons is in production. According to Roman Kotkov, editor-in-chief of Bubble Comics, this project is still at an early stage of development, but the style for future releases is already being selected.

== List of comics ==
=== Series ===
- Demonslayer (Бесобой, 2012–2016) – a low fantasy series about a demon hunter in modern Moscow
  - Demonslayer vol.2 (2017–2021) – a sequel of Demonslayer
- Major Grom (Майор Гром, 2012–2016) – a detective series in which Russian policeman Igor Grom investigates various crimes, including mystical ones. The adventures of Igor Grom continue in the following comics:
  - Igor Grom (Игорь Гром, 2017–2021) – a sequel of Major Grom
  - Major Igor Grom (Майор Игорь Гром, 2021–present) – a sequel of Igor Grom
- Friar (Инок, 2012–2016) – a time travel fantasy based on Russian history and Orthodox Christianity
  - Realmwalkers (Мироходцы, 2017–2018) – a sequel of Friar
- Red Fury (Красная Фурия, 2012–2016) – a story about spy super agents
  - Allies (Союзники, 2017–2020) – a sequel of the Red Fury series
- Meteora (Метеора, 2014–present) – a space opera series about cosmic smugglers
- Exlibrium (Экслибриум, 2014–present) – a low fantasy series about a secret order of magicians who protect Earth from fictional characters who become real
- Coolix (Крутиксы, 2017–2018) – comic series for children about superhero animals
- Plague Doctor (Чумной Доктор, 2020–present) – a series about two antagonists from Major Grom
- MIR (МИР, 2020–present) – a comic following a Soviet superhero who died during the Cold war and was resurrected in the present day

==== Miniseries ====
- Time of the Raven (Время Ворона, 2015–2016) – a crossover about the characters from Major Grom, Demonslayer, Red Fury, and Friar
- Witch-Hunt (Охота на ведьм, 2018) – a comic following Time of a Raven

== See also ==
- List of Russian superheroes
