= Major Grom =

Russian comic book series

- Cover of English edition of first issue (October 2012)

Publication information
- Publisher: Bubble Comics
- Schedule: Monthly
- Format: Ended
- Publication date: 8 October 2012
- No. of issues: 50
- Main characters: Igor Grom; Dima Dubin; Yulia Pchelkina; Sergey Razumovsky; Fedor Prokopenko

Creative team
- Created by: Artyom Gabrelyanov; Evgeny Fedotov
- Written by: Artyom Gabrelyanov; Evgeny Fedotov; Dmitry Tikhonov; Ivan Skorokhodov; Roman Kotkov
- Artists: Konstantin Tarasov; Anastasia Kim; Anna Rud; Ekaterina Menadbe; Yulia Zhuravleva; Margarita Kablukova; Nina Vakueva; Eduard Petrovich; Andrey Vasin

Major Grom (Russian: Майор Гром, romanized: Mayor Grom) is a comic book series published by Russian publisher Bubble Comics. It ran from 2012 to 2016. Most issues were written by Artyom Gabrelyanov and Evgeniy Fedotov. Artists who contributed to the series include Konstantin Tarasov, Anastasia "Phobs" Kim, Yulia Zhuravleva, and Anna Rud. In January 2017, as part of the Second Wind event, the series was closed and replaced with another one, under the title Igor Grom, which serves as a sequel to Major Grom. In 2021, Igor Grom was also ended and followed by the next series, Major Igor Grom.

The main action of the comic takes place in Saint Petersburg. The protagonist is a police major named Igor Grom, who is known for his uncompromising attitude to crime, his honesty and integrity, as well as his detective abilities and hand-to-hand combat skills. The series arc is intertwined with other Bubble Comics series, such as Red Fury, Demonslayer, and Friar. The main characters of the listed series interact directly in the crossover arc, The Time of the Raven.

In general, Major Grom received positive reviews. The first story, titled The Plague Doctor, did not fare well with reviewers. Nevertheless, critics noted that the quality of the comics gradually improved with each subsequent story. On 19 February 2017, the short film Major Grom was released. In 2021, a feature film adaptation of the first story was released under the title Major Grom: Plague Doctor.

== Story ==
The first story, Plague Doctor, revolves around a vigilante of the same name who kills corrupt medical practitioners, businesspeople, and government officials. Igor Grom and his partner, a trainee named Dmitry Dubin, are charged with solving the case. During the investigation, Igor meets journalist Yulia Pchelkina, whom he saves from thugs, and also fights with the Plague Doctor himself and loses. After the battle, Grom allegedly reveals the identity of the murderer, but the accusation turns out to be erroneous, and he is removed from the case. In the end, Grom guesses that behind the mask of the Plague Doctor hides billionaire and founder of the Vmeste social network, Sergei Razumovsky. It turns out that Razumovsky needs an alter ego in order to get rid of his former cronies among the elites, who could potentially incriminate him for the sadistic torture of homeless people that he commits in his mansion. In addition, Razumovsky hopes to take advantage of protests against corrupt government officials in order to seize power. In the end, Grom manages to stop the Plague Doctor and imprison him.

Afterward, the major goes on vacation to Dublin, where he prevents the assassination of the British Queen by the terrorist group Children of St. Patrick (St. Patrick's Day story arc). After returning to Russia, Grom stops a gang of three female bank robbers disguised as Disney princesses: Ariel, Jasmine, and Cinderella (Just Like a Fairy Tale story arc). At this time, with the help of his childhood friend and mercenary, Oleg Volkov, Sergei Razumovsky escapes from prison and plans to get revenge on major Grom. He places bombs all over St. Petersburg and challenges Igor to defuse them. In addition, he kidnaps Grom's family and friends and sends the major a photograph of them in his captivity. In order to save them, Grom must go to Venice to play chess with Razumovsky, where each of Grom's pieces taken by his opponent equals the death of one captive. Grom fails to save most of his loved ones, including Yulia Pchelkina (The Game story arc).

Some time passes, with Igor trying to recover from Yulia's death. To distract himself, he devotes all his time to work. He takes on the case of a mass disappearance of children and, during the investigation, establishes that they were abducted. Grom catches the kidnapper, who confesses to his crime. The miscreant claims to have heard voices coming from the helmet of the mythical raven god Kutkh, which he found at an archeological site. Later in the story, Grom decides to kill Razumovsky (The Voices story arc).

Grom tries to kill the Plague Doctor when he is transferred to another prison, but the latter is kidnapped by the Children of St. Patrick and taken to Siberia to become an avatar for the raven god Kutkh. On the way north, Grom meets the ICA (International Control Agency) team along with Nika Chaikina, known as Red Fury, and offers them his help. Igor and Nika arrive in Siberia, where they find Kutkh, who has captured Friar. The heroes begin to fight with the villain, but they lose. Kutkh turns Grom into a monster, who then has a dream where Yulia Pchelkina is alive. In the dream, Yulia gives the major a shard of glass and orders him to kill Razumovsky. Grom realises that it is an illusion and refuses, stating that he forgives the murderer. Afterward, he awakes and returns to human form as the light side of Kutkh comes to his aid. The two sides of the raven god collide and disintegrate into black and white feathers. Razumovsky manages to escape, but Grom decides to ignore him and, instead of pursuing his enemy, starts rebuilding his own life (The Time of the Raven crossover arc).

Grom begins to take experimental antidepressants, which help him suppress hallucinations and save his life in his fight against an assassin who calls himself the Sphinx and uses hypnotism (The Riddle of the Sphinx story arc). The major learns that once, an investigator named Ilya Kosygin almost put an end to the drug mafia in the city, but was killed. Later, Grom is accosted by Kosygin himself, who explains that he decided to fake his death and lie low after an attempt on his life. Kosygin offers Grom his help. Having found the right-hand man of The Shadow, a man named Zaur, they force him to lead them to his boss. Upon arriving, Kosygin knocks out Grom and kills Zaur, as well as The Shadow and his family. Coming to, Grom prevents the murder of The Shadow's grandson, and Kosygin escapes. Later, at an appointment with his psychiatrist, Veniamin Rubinstein, Grom talks about everything that happened. After listening to him, the psychiatrist concludes that the side effects of the antidepressants caused Grom to experience a split personality, and all the murders committed by Kosygin were in fact the work of Grom himself. The comic ends with Grom being confined to a mental hospital (The Last Case story arc).

=== Main characters ===
- Major Igor Grom is the protagonist of the series. A police major with a keen sense of justice, who follows a strict moral code. Despite these positive qualities, he can sometimes be overly aggressive and straightforward. He has a habit of solving complex problems with brute force, but, if necessary, is able to act with more finesse. He uses logical thinking as well as physical prowess. He always wears a cap, a gray scarf, and a brown jacket.
- Dmitry "Dima" Dubin is Igor Grom's partner. He is naive and idealistic. He became a policeman after being inspired by films and books about heroic adventures. Dreaming of having similar adventures, he studied at the Moscow University of the Ministry of Internal Affairs, where he became the best student. After completing his studies, he returned to his hometown of St. Petersburg, where he got his dream job with the police. Through he is not as experienced a detective and fighter as Grom, he is decisive enough and a dependable partner.
- Yulia Pchelkina is a journalist and Igor Grom's girlfriend. She is open-minded and optimistic by nature, has a strong will, and easily attracts others. Yulia is willing to risk her life to help her friends. She met Grom after he saved her from thugs. She is killed by the Plague Doctor at the end of The Game. Her death dramatically changes Grom's personality: he falls into depression and begins to think about killing Razumovsky, fearing that the latter will break free and continue his murders.
- Fedor Prokopenko is an elderly and experienced police colonel, head of the department in which major Grom works. He respects Igor, but, despite this, often reprimands him for excessive willfulness.
- Sergei Razumovsky / Plague Doctor is major Grom's archenemy. He is also known as The Citizen; a philanthropist billionaire, he is the founder of the Vmeste social network. He grew up in an orphanage. Since childhood, he has felt like a "white crow" and dreamed of changing the world for the better. After becoming rich, he gained popularity with young people and became known for his eccentric antics. He uses the alter ego of the Plague Doctor to commit murders. At the end of the first story arc, while in prison, he acquires a split personality: one, who calls himself the Plague Doctor, is a bloodthirsty and cruel killer, and the other is weak-willed. He is a good strategist and fighter, as well as a skillful hacker and programmer, and has leadership qualities.
- Oleg Volkov is a mercenary, head of the security service of Vmeste, as well as a childhood friend and bodyguard of Sergei Razumovsky, with whom he grew up in an orphanage. He is extremely loyal to Sergei.

== Development ==
To expand the potential audience of Bubble Comics, Artyom Gabrelyanov began developing archetypal plots, one of them being a detective story about a police officer. In October 2012, Bubble began publishing four superhero comic series that formed the basis of the Bubble comic universe: Major Grom, Red Fury, Demonslayer, and Friar. The persona of Major Grom grew from the Mister Policeman character in the Bubble humorous comic magazine, which was the first comic ever released by the publisher. In it, Mister Policeman sometimes turned into a superhero and saved everyone, while the rest of the time, he was an ordinary police officer. When Bubble magazine ceased publication, Gabrelyanov and another writer, Evgeny Fedotov, developed the idea of a superhero police officer, deciding that he should solve serious cases, sometimes with supernatural elements. The first image of Major Grom was drawn by artist Konstantin Tarasov, and Anastasia "Phobs" Kim designed the villains. Kim was already a popular artist on the internet at that time, and she was engaged in drawing some of the story arcs of the comic. In part, Major Grom's audience grew due to the popularity of her previous work.

After the release of the Major Grom comic, some critics began to accuse Bubble of pro-Kremlin propaganda, since the main villain of the first story arc, the Plague Doctor, kills corrupt officials and businesspeople while leaving white ribbons (a symbol of anti-government protests) at his murder sites, and amid upheaval based on the 2011–2013 Russian protests, the public in the comics begins to consider him a hero. Even Aram Gabrelyanov, who is well known for his pro-Kremlin position, was worried at the time that his son was denigrating the Russian opposition in the comic. Artyom, in response to the accusations, said that when he was developing the image of the Plague Doctor, he did not plan to make him such a likeable villain, and the white ribbons were added to the plot "by accident, for fun, and for provocation, of course". According to him, he noticed that readers liked the Plague Doctor more than Igor Grom, the protagonist of the series, and he felt that he was "taking the reader in the wrong direction", and therefore decided to make him an unsympathetic villain: a maniac who wanted to take advantage of peaceful protests and begin a bloody coup d'état. In later issues of Major Grom, the writers chose not to touch on political topics.

== Publishing ==
The first issue was released on 8 October 2012; subsequent issues of Major Grom were also published on the eighth of each month, until October 2014, when publication was changed to the fifth day of the month, due to the release of two new series, Meteora and Exlibrium, which led to changes in the release schedule. After that, there were occasional exceptions: some issues were released a few days earlier and others later. Certain issues had an additional circulation with alternate covers, most often timed to coincide with festivals, or being exclusive to specific comic book stores. Issues 35–40 were included in The Time of the Raven crossover arc. On 28 October 2015, the first issue of Major Grom was published in ComiXology. In December 2016, along with the release of the 50th issue of the comic, the publisher announced the ending of the series. In January 2017, as part of the rebooting of the main Bubble comics series, Major Grom received a sequel series called Igor Grom, which focuses on Igor Grom's life after leaving the mental hospital, no longer a police major. Igor Grom also ended with the release of its 50th issue; the story continued in the Major Igor Grom series, recounting Grom's adventures after his return to the police.

On 1 October 2014, the first volume of the comic was released and included the first six issues. Subsequently, other issues also appeared as part of larger volumes. Each volume included a reprint with an alternate cover. In addition to the comics themselves, other materials were included, such as creator commentary, concept art, and sketches of covers with unused versions. The seventh volume, Major Grom and Red Fury: Book 7 – In the Heart of Darkness, a compendium of Major Grom and Red Fury comics, contained issues 38 through 41 of the respective series.

=== Spin-off comics ===
To promote the short film adaptation, a comic entitled Major Grom: Chance was released on 15 February 2017, serving as a backstory to the events of the film. In addition to the comic itself, the publication also contained additional backstage material. On 29 December 2018, a one-shot spin-off, Major Grom: The Promise, was released, showing one day in the life of Igor Grom and Yulia Pchelkina. In the graphic novel The Chronicles of Friar: Storming of Berlin, which takes place during World War II, the grandfather of the protagonist of the Friar series teams up with the grandfather of Igor Grom in a fight against soldiers of the Third Reich. In 2016, at the Homyakon festival, organized by Bubble, the parody comic book Igor Eel was announced, in which the main characters of the series appear as talking animals, such as an eel, a sardine, or a snake.

At Comic-Con Russia 2019, a spin-off series of four issues, Major Grom: As at War, was presented, in which the young Igor Grom, who had just become a police officer, tries to solve the most serious crimes in St. Petersburg. A graphic novel, Major Grom: 1939, stylized after the Golden Age comics, was also released, situating Grom in the Soviet Union of 1939. Several spin-offs dedicated to the side characters of the comics were also released: the first was Dubin Dima: Provincial Holidays, about the adventures of Grom's partner, Dima Dubin. This was published as part of the Bubble Legends series from May to August 2018. The second was Plague Doctor, which recounts the life of Sergei Razumovsky after the events of The Time of the Raven crossover. At Comic-Con Russia 2020, the collection Major Grom: Hero Forever was presented and included six new stories dedicated to different versions of the hero, such as Grom from the original comic, retired Grom from Igor Grom, Grom from the Major Grom: Plague Doctor film, and Grom as a talking eel from Igor Eel.

== Reception ==
Major Grom received mixed reviews from Russian critics. The first issues of the series received some criticism from both readers and reviewers, who called out the excessively simple and clichéd plot, dialogues, and character archetypes, as well as the politicization of the first story arc. Subsequent issues received more positive reviews, mainly for the departure from politics and the development of the characters of Igor Grom and the Plague Doctor from formulaic caricatures into deeper and more detailed personages.

In a retrospective from the Kanobu site, in the context of the Second Wind event, which rebooted the Bubble comic series, Major Grom was named the most impressive of the publisher's repertoire. The reason for this, according to the author, was Igor Grom's lack of superpowers as well as his being an ordinary person. It was also noted that Major Grom decently demonstrates the development of the main characters, Igor Grom into an insecure, broken, and depressed person and his archenemy, Sergei Razumovsky, into a cruel monster. Arseny Krymov, a reviewer for the magazine Mir Fantastiki, noted that Major Grom's plot about an honest police officer fighting crime reads like generic fiction compared to the rest of the publisher's comic series, adding that he would be more appropriate in a series like Streets of Broken Lights than in a superhero comic. The reviewer did not ignore the politicization of Major Grom, noting that its first story arc was built on "plots taken from the top of the current events list", political memes such as "white ribbons", and the phrase "crooks and thieves". Avoiding politicization in further issues was called by Krymov a successful decision, which went in the comic's favor, since the plot did not pretend to be serious political commentary. W-O-S editor Kirill Savinov, in his comments on the first issues of the series, called them "conservative, pro-government, with bright but not overly conscientious art, and simplified dialogues". Nevertheless, Savinov called the appearance of Bubble comics favorable for the development of the Russian industry of drawn stories, and that their release would spur the development of underground Russian comics. Major Grom also appeared in the "Comic of the Day" section of the site, where it was named "the most shameless" Bubble comic, as well as the only Russian comic with a Western fan base.

A columnist from Geek-Freak.ru praised the comic for good art and charismatic characters: Grom was called an interesting protagonist and Plague Doctor a well-written villain, reminiscent of the "Joker, with a touch of typical anime antihero". Among its flaws were the similarity of Major Grom to a typical hero from the action films of the early 2000s, as well as the weak development of Dima Dubin's character. A reviewer from the Comixi.ru portal, on the contrary, criticized Igor Grom for his flatness and the absence of internal struggle and doubts of the character. The Plague Doctor received a more favorable response and was called a memorable character. The comic itself was criticized for its simplicity, politicization, and excessive pretentiousness. Despite this, Major Grom received three stars out of five for striving to popularize the comics industry in Russia. An author on the Redrumers site, in his article about early Bubble comics, described the first issues of the series as too simple, plot-wise. Subsequent arcs fared better: the development of both Major Grom and Plague Doctor characters was noted. Stepan Zaitsev of StoneForest.ru also appreciated the gradual development of the series and its characters, and noted that the tone of the story becomes darker in later issues. The artwork by Konstantin Tarasov, which the author compared to manga, as well as that of artists Anna Rud, Eduard Petrovich, and Andrey Vasin, was met positively. Anastasia Kim's art style, however, was criticized for its "embellished body anatomy" and "nicey-nice facial shapes". As a result, Zaitsev gave the comic 8/10 and called it an interesting detective series, with exciting investigations and action scenes.

Nikolai Filonchik from Geekster complained of the same flaws: the character of Igor Grom was not sufficiently developed, which made him more like a "machine" than a living person. Nevertheless, the first two issues were called more successful than those of Demonslayer. An improvement in the quality of the comics was also noticed, both in terms of story and in art; this was written in a review of the eleventh issue by Konstantin Buyanov, also representing Geekster. In his opinion, the art style of Anastasia Kim was reminiscent of Disney's works and generally more pleasing to the eye than the rough and angular style of Konstantin Tarasov, while the plot of later issues was an improvement over the early ones. The comic was most severely criticized by the site SpiderMedia.ru. In addition to solidarity with the opinion of other reviewers regarding the lack of depth of the plot and characters, the politicization, and crude art, Major Grom was also reprimanded for lack of originality, vulgar portrayal of female characters, and labored style of writing. The main audience of the comic book was named "people who make the box office for Russian films and watch Russian television, and who are not very familiar with comics". In another review from SpiderMedia.ru, aimed at analyzing the dynamics of the development of the series two years after its start, the authors noted a radical improvement in quality of the comic plot from arc to arc. A continued lack of depth in the story was noted, however, as well as the fact that too little attention was paid to Grom's partner, Dima Dubin, a potentially interesting character within the plot. Like many other reviewers, SpiderMedia.ru representatives praised Anastasia Kim's art.

== Film adaptations ==
=== Major Grom ===
The possibility of creating a film adaptation of a Bubble Comics project, including Major Grom, was considered by the general director of the publishing house, Artyom Gabrelyanov, ever since its founding. In October 2015, at Comic-Con Russia, the creation of Bubble Studios was announced, with the intent of creating film adaptations of the comics. Major Grom was selected as the first story to be adapted due to the peculiarities of its plot and setting, which would save costs on special effects. The film was directed by Vladimir Besedin, known for his satirical web series Gaffy Gaf Show on YouTube. He also cowrote the script, with Gabrelyanov. Igor Grom was portrayed by Russian actor Alexander Gorbatov. The film itself is a 29-minute short intended to serve as a pilot project before the development of a full-length film. The story is about Major Grom, who tries to stop a bank robbery, rescue hostages, and arrest a gang of three bandits hiding their identities behind the masks of characters from the Soviet cartoon Puck! Puck!.

The film's international premiere took place on 11 February 2017 at the Berlin International Film Festival. On 19 February 2017, it was broadcast live on the Life.ru website. On 21 February, it was published on YouTube, where it gained more than 1.7 million views on the first day. Critics' reviews were mostly positive: they noted the high-quality visuals of the film and its action scenes, but they negatively assessed the acting and a primitive plot.

=== Major Grom: Plague Doctor ===
Representatives of Bubble have repeatedly stated that the short film was only a pilot project, and if successful, the shooting of a full-length film and, probably, film adaptations of other Bubble comics would follow. With the positive reception of the short, on 30 September 2017, at Comic-Con Russia, the full-length feature Major Grom: Plague Doctor was announced and a teaser was shown. Following this, the project faced difficulties in production for some time, with the original team disbanding and later reassembling, and the concept being redone from scratch. Instead of Vladimir Besedin, Oleg Trofim, best known for the 2018 film Ice, became the director, and Tikhon Zhiznevsky replaced Alexander Gorbatov in the role of Igor Grom. The film is a loose adaptation of the first story arc of the comic series, and tells the story of the confrontation between police major Igor Grom and the vigilante murderer known as Plague Doctor.

The premiere of Major Grom: Plague Doctor took place on 25 March 2021 in St. Petersburg. On 1 April 2021, a wide release took place. The film was released online on 5 May 2021 on KinoPoisk and Netflix. Netflix released it internationally on 17 July 2021. The film received mixed reviews, with critics pointing to a lack of originality and excessive copying of Hollywood clichés. Some reviewers found hints of pro-government propaganda, though others disputed this. The film became a box office bomb: with a budget of 640 million rubles, it brought in only 328 million rubles.
