= IgroMir =

Annual Russian video game exhibition

IgroMir Игромир
- Status: Active
- Genre: Video game exhibition
- Frequency: Annually
- Venue: Timiryazev Centre
- Location: Moscow
- Country: Russia
- Years active: 2006–2019, 2025–present
- Inaugurated: 4 November 2006; 20 years ago
- Most recent: 12 December 2025; 10 months ago
- Attendance: 183,000 (2019)
- Organizer: Russian Game Developers Conference; MDTS LLC

IgroMir (Russian: ИгроМир, Gaming World) is the first large-scale annual exhibition of computer and video games in Russia, organized in Moscow by the committee of the Russian Game Developers Conference.

The exhibition quickly grew to a four-day event (Thursday to Sunday), with the first day reserved for industry members, the press, and VIPs. It was held on the first weekend of November at VDNKh Exhibition Center for its first five years, then from 2011 moved to Crocus Expo and was held on the first weekend of October. Since 2014, Comic-Con Russia has been held as part of IgroMir and attendance averaged 160,000 people, the capacity of the venue. The 2019 event had the highest attendance with over 183,000 people. After 2019, the event went on hiatus for five years, initially due to the COVID-19 pandemic and later the bankruptcy of the organisers. In 2025, the event, alongside Comic-Con Russia, was revived by MDTS LLC.

== History ==
=== 2006 ===
The exhibition was first held from 4 to 5 November 2006, at the VDNKh Exhibition Center. According to the organizers, attendance exceeded 25,000 people. About 45 domestic and foreign companies were present, showing more than 100 games for different platforms.

=== 2007 ===
In 2007, IgroMir returned to the VDNKh Center for an expanded exhibition from 2 to 4 November (Friday to Sunday). The exhibition area increased from 9,000 to 13,000 square metres (97,000 to 140,000 sq ft), and there were about 45,000 to 50,000 visitors, including exhibitors and the press. The exhibition was attended by domestic game companies such as Russobit-M, 1C, Akella, and Nival Online, as well as by Western publishers such as Electronic Arts, Microsoft, Sony Computer Entertainment, Nintendo, Sega and others. Some games were shown to the public for the first time. Many were presented by developers, such as Epic Games President Mike Capps, Ubisoft's Jade Raymond and representatives of Bizarre Creations, Creative Assembly and Running with Scissors.

=== 2008 ===
IgroMir continued to grow and switched to a four-day format (Thursday to Sunday) held from 6 to 9 November in 2008. The first day was called the business day in which games were presented to industry members and the press in a relaxed business setting. The remaining three days were open to the public. The total number of visitors exceeded 65,000 people, with more than 120 exhibitors. Among them were leading western companies: Electronic Arts, Microsoft, Sony Computer Entertainment, Nintendo, Sega, Ubisoft, and Blizzard Entertainment. The total exhibition area increased to 14,000 square metres (150,000 sq ft).

=== 2009 ===
The 2009 exhibition again took place at the VDNKh Center from 5 to 8 November. According to estimates of the organizers and the VDNKh police department, the exhibition was visited by 82,000 people. The exhibition attracted domestic game companies (such as 1C, Akella, Buka, Nival), and Western companies Microsoft, Sony Computer Entertainment, Blizzard Entertainment, Electronic Arts, Activision, Nintendo and Sega. VIP guests to the exhibition included Joe Kucan and Anatoly Wasserman.

=== 2010 ===
In 2010, the fifth IgroMir was held from 3 to 6 November at VDNKh, and was partnered with Gamer.ru social network and Mail.ru. The exhibition was attended by more than 110 companies, and occupied more than 13,000 square metres (140,000 sq ft) of exhibition space. The business day was attended by more than 3,500 professionals and more than 900 members of the press. According to estimates of the organizers and police, over 90,000 people attended.

=== 2011 ===
The sixth edition of the exhibition was held at the Crocus Expo hall in Moscow, held from 6 to 9 October. The total size of the exhibition exceeded 16,000 square metres (170,000 sq ft). It attracted Microsoft, Sony Computer Entertainment, Nintendo, Electronic Arts, 1C-SoftClub, Akella, Nival, Wargaming.net, Gaijin Entertainment, Blizzard Entertainment and others. In addition to exhibits, a main stage had a special entertainment program which included rapper Noize MC and Underwood. As in the previous three years, the four-day exhibition began with a business day followed by three public admission days.

=== 2012 ===
IgroMir 2012 was held from 4 to 7 October at Crocus Expo. For the first time, family games were exhibited in a separate room. There was also competitive gaming, featuring the final fights of the Panzar: Forged by Chaos game contest with prize money of 1 ₽ million.

=== 2013 ===
IgroMir 2013 was held from 3 to 6 October at Crocus Expo. Exhibition space was increased to 50,000 square metres (540,000 sq ft), and Gaijin Entertainment's booth included two real WWII-era tanks. There was a separate room for competitive gaming, where tournaments were held for the final of League of Legends, StarCraft II, and others.

=== 2014 ===
In 2014, IgroMir was held from 2 to 5 October at Crocus Expo and combined with the Russian Game Developers Conference. The first Comic-Con Russia was also hosted as part of IgroMir. Attendance over the four days was estimated at 152,000.

=== 2015 ===
In 2015, IgroMir was held from 1 to 4 October at Crocus Expo, and again included Comic-Con Russia. Cosplayers were also recruited for the exhibition. Attendance exceeded 160,000.

=== 2016 ===
In 2016, IgroMir was held 29 September to 2 October at Crocus Expo. There were 250 exhibiting companies attracting 1,900 members of the press and an estimated 163,000 attendees.

=== 2017 ===
In 2017, IgroMir was held 28 September to 11 October at Crocus Expo. The main guests were game developer Richard Garriott, and actors Christopher Lloyd, Rutger Hauer and Stephanie Corneliussen. The exhibition area was 26,500 square metres (285,000 sq ft), and estimated attendance was 164,000.

=== 2018 ===
In 2018, IgroMir was held from 4 to 7 October at Crocus Expo. Comic-Con Russia continued to be held with it. As in the past years, attendance strained the four-day 160,000-capacity limit of the venue.

=== 2019 ===
In 2019, the exhibition was held from 3 to 6 October at Crocus Expo. Attendance was estimated to be 183,000.

=== 2025 ===
After a hiatus for several years, IgroMir returned as a combination event with Comic Con Russia, being held from 12 to 14 December. The venue changed to Timiryazev Centre.

== Attendance ==
Year	Dates	Venue	Attendance (estimated)
2006	4–5 Nov.	VDNKh Exhibition Center	25,000
2007	2–4 Nov.	VDNKh Exhibition Center	50,000
2008	6–9 Nov.	VDNKh Exhibition Center	65,000
2009	5–8 Nov.	VDNKh Exhibition Center	82,000
2010	3–6 Nov.	VDNKh Exhibition Center	90,000
2011	6–9 Oct.	Crocus Expo	95,000
2012	4–7 Oct.	Crocus Expo	105,000
2013	3–6 Oct.	Crocus Expo	130,000
2014	2–5 Oct.	Crocus Expo	157,000
2015	1–4 Oct.	Crocus Expo	162,000
2016	29 Sep. – 2 Oct.	Crocus Expo	163,000
2017	28 Sep. – 1 Oct.	Crocus Expo	164,000
2018	4–7 Oct.	Crocus Expo	c. 160,000
2019	3–6 Oct.	Crocus Expo	183,000
2025	12–14 Dec.	Timiryazev Centre	Unknown

== See also ==
- Asia Game Show
- Electronic Entertainment Expo
- Game Developers Conference
- Gamescom
- Games Convention
- Paris Game Festival
- Russian Game Developers Conference
- Tokyo Game Show
