= Evgeniy Chebatkov =

Kazakh comedian

- Евгений Чебатков
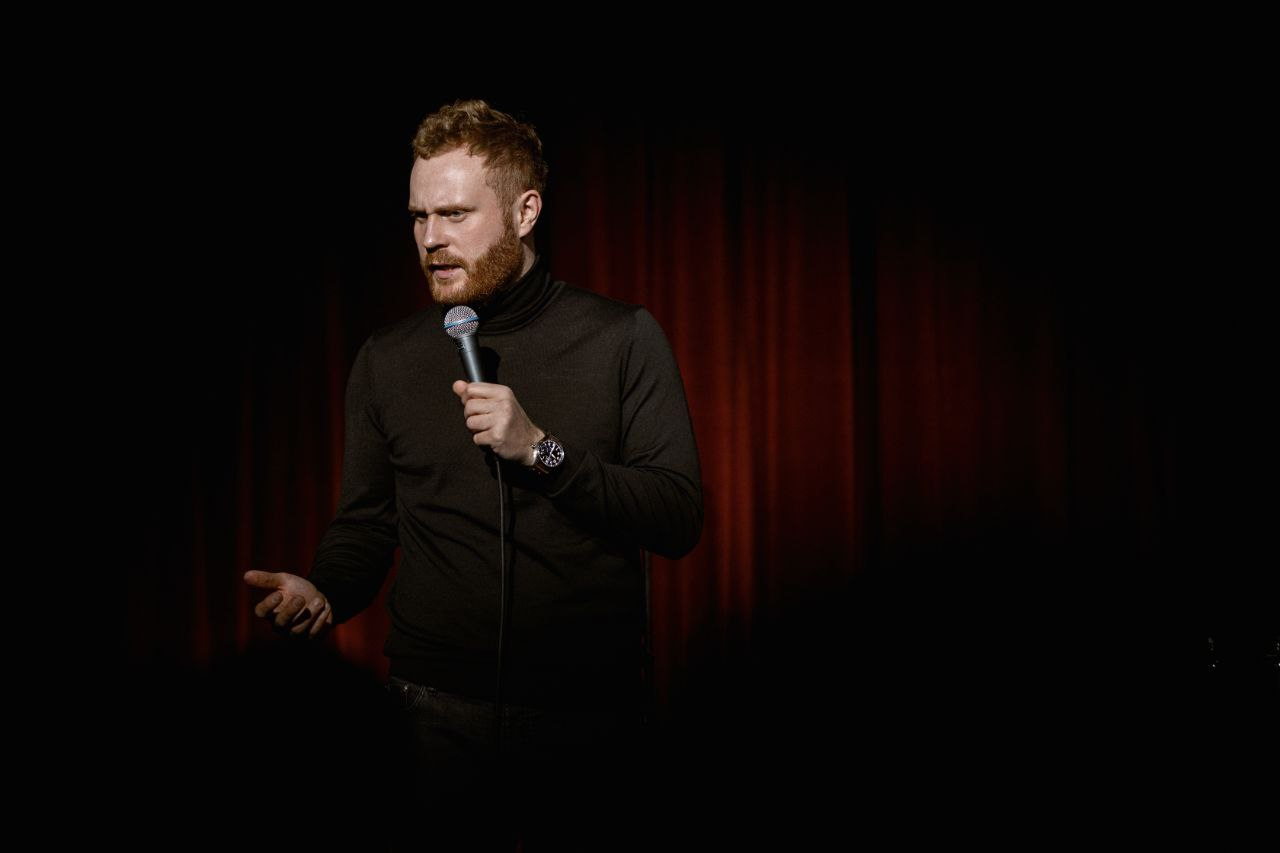
- Chebatkov in 2023
- Born: 13 September 1990 (age 36); Ust-Kamenogorsk, East Kazakhstan Region, Kazakh SSR, Soviet Union

Comedy career
- Years active: 2015–present
- Medium: stand-up
- Website: chbtkv.com

Evgeniy Andreyevich Chebatkov (Russian: Евгений Андреевич Чебатков; born 13 September 1990) is a Kazakh-born stand-up comedian and media personality, who's notable for mainly performing in Russia.

Chebatkov is a co-presenter of the Bedtime Story podcast of the LABELSMART YouTube channel. A prominent TV presenter of the TNT TV channel, he has led the programmes Stand Up, The Game, and Concerts.

== Early life and education ==
Chebatkov was born in Ust-Kamenogorsk to a music teacher and metallurgical factory worker. He attended school No. 17. During his childhood, for two years, he learned English in the Mormons community.

After finishing school, Chebatkov was enrolled at Tomsk State University in 2008, where he attended the international administration faculty. In Tomsk, he began his radio presenter career. From 2008 to 2013, he presented Europa Plus Tomsk. Alongside this, from 2012 to 2013, he was a TV presenter at Tomsk's "TB2" TV channel. At age 16, he started volunteering at a local American cultural center.

In 2013, Chebatkov started attending Niagara College in Canada. There, he started stand-up comedy.

== Career ==
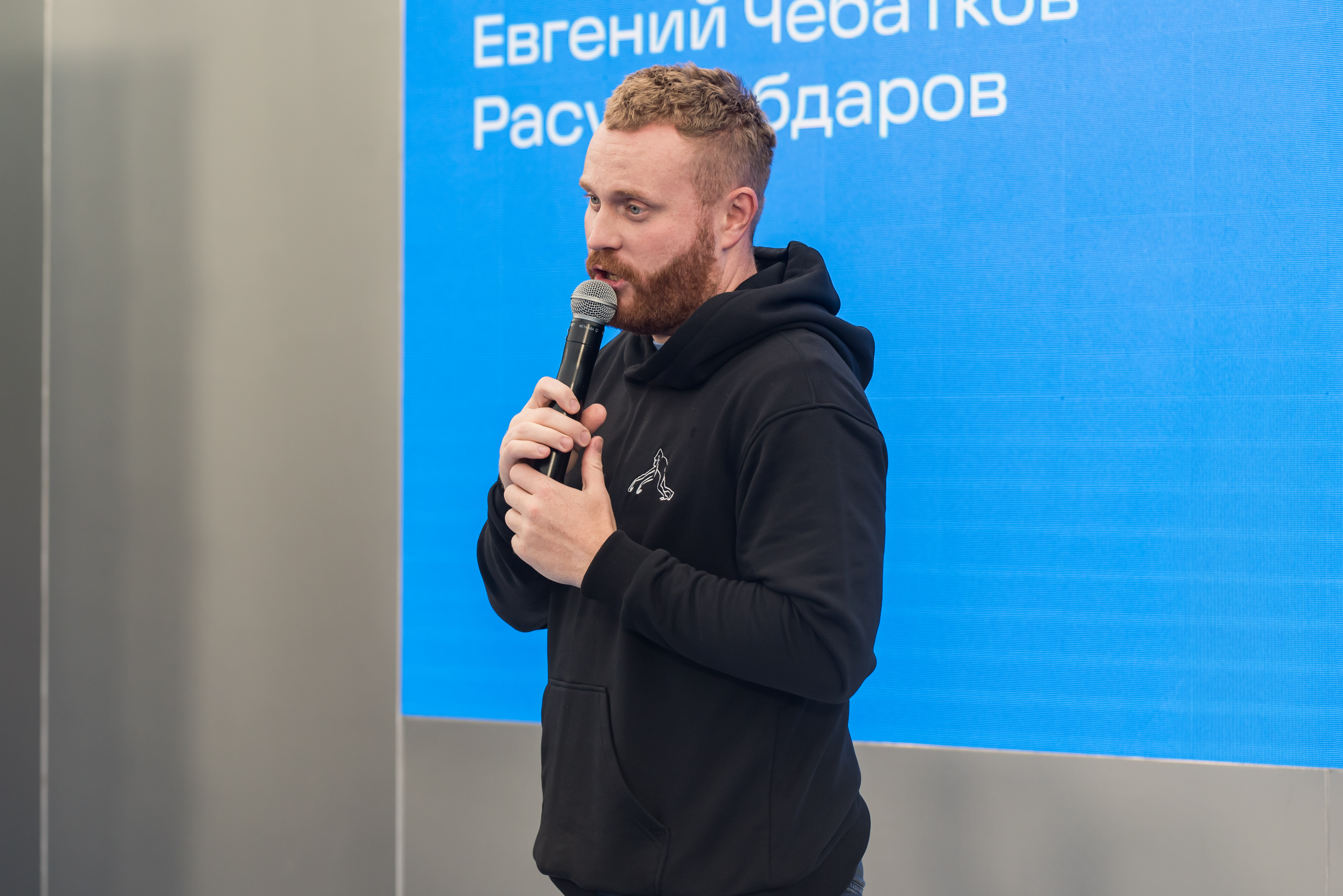
Chebatkov at the 2023 VK Fest, Saint Petersburg, Russia

After receiving his master's degree, Chebatkov moved to Moscow, and started working from 2015 to 2017 for the company "BBDO Moscow" as copywriter.

Since 2015, he has been performing at Moscow open mics. In 2016, he was featured at TNT's "Stand Up" programme. Since 2017, he was presenter of "Happy People" at Comedy Radio.

In 2022, Chebatkov became the new main presenter of TNT's "Stand Up".

Since 2023, he has done readings of Russian classical literature at the Russian State Library.

== Personal life ==
In July 2023, Chebatkov got married in Moscow to actress Vera Drovenikova.

== Filmography ==
=== Television ===
Year	Title	Role	Notes
2018	Rise of the Teenage Mutant Ninja Turtles	Leonardo	Voice actor (Russian dub)
2020	Ollie's Pack	Head teacher Magna, Lucius Van Horn, supporting characters	Voice actor (Russian dub)
2021	The Game	Presenter	
2022—2023	Concerts	Presenter	
2023	Stand Up	Presenter	
2023	Major Grom: The Game	"Uncle", jail gang leader	Actor
2024	1040 km	Tanker	Actor
2025	Nightingale vs. Muromets	Presenter of "Iron Heroes"	Actor

=== Solo concerts ===
Date	Title	Original title	Площадка	Хронометраж
1 December 2020	Without the Shell	Без панциря	OUTSIDE STAND UP	00:36:34
3 March 2021	Leave the Room	Выходи из комнаты	OUTSIDE STAND UP	00:59:05
1 February 2023	Slavic Values		OUTSIDE STAND UP	00:41:53
25 April 2023	Don't Turn Back	Не оборачивайся	OUTSIDE STAND UP	01:09:11
20 May 2024	Lava	Лава	OUTSIDE STAND UP	00:46:47
27 June 2025	Deer fly-Man	Deer fly-Man	Kinopoisk	00:58:00
