= Aleksandr Varlamov (composer, born 1904) =

Russian composer

- Александр Варламов
- Born: Aleksandr Vladimirovich Varlamov; 19 June 1904; Simbirsk, Russian Empire
- Died: 20 August 1990 (aged 86); Moscow, Soviet Union
- Occupations: Composer, conductor, pedagogue
- Honours: Honoured Worker of the Arts Industry of the RSFSR (1979)

Aleksandr Vladimirovich Varlamov (Russian: Алекса́ндр Влади́мирович Варла́мов, IPA: [Alˈjexˈandˈer vladˈimˈirˈoviˈtʃ varˈmaˈlɔv]; 19 June 1904 – 20 August 1990) was a Russian Soviet jazz composer and arranger. He was also the conductor of the jazz orchestra with the All-Union Radio Committee, along with being a singer and the leader of the leading Jazz orchestras in the Soviet Union, called the State Jazz Orchestra of the USSR. Additionally, he is accredited with founding the first ever, Soviet group of musician-improvisers called "The Seven" [Семерка]. He played an instrumental role in popularizing jazz music in Russia during the 1930s and amassed a huge corpus of works during his lifetime, up to 400 compositions include pieces for variety orchestra, songs, and music for films and cartoons. He was the great-grandson of Aleksandr Yegorovich Varlamov. He was awarded the title of Honoured Worker of the Arts Industry of the RSFSR in 1979.

== Filmography ==
- Doctor Aybolit (1938)
- Stepan Razin (1939)
- Animated Crocodile (episodes 1 and 5; 1960–1961)
- The Wild Swans (1962)
- Puck! Puck! (1964)

== See also ==
- Music of the Soviet Union
- Russian jazz
- The Russian Jazz Quartet

== Future reading ==
- "Варламов Александр Владимирович — Джаз. XX век — Яндекс.Словари". web.archive.org. 2013-01-27. Retrieved 2021-07-21.
- "Исполнитель: Александр Варламов.. | любители музыки психо-прог-арт-этно-блюз-рок | VK". vk.com. Retrieved 2021-07-21.
