= Aleksei Maklakov =

Russian actor and singer (born 1962)

- Алексей Маклаков
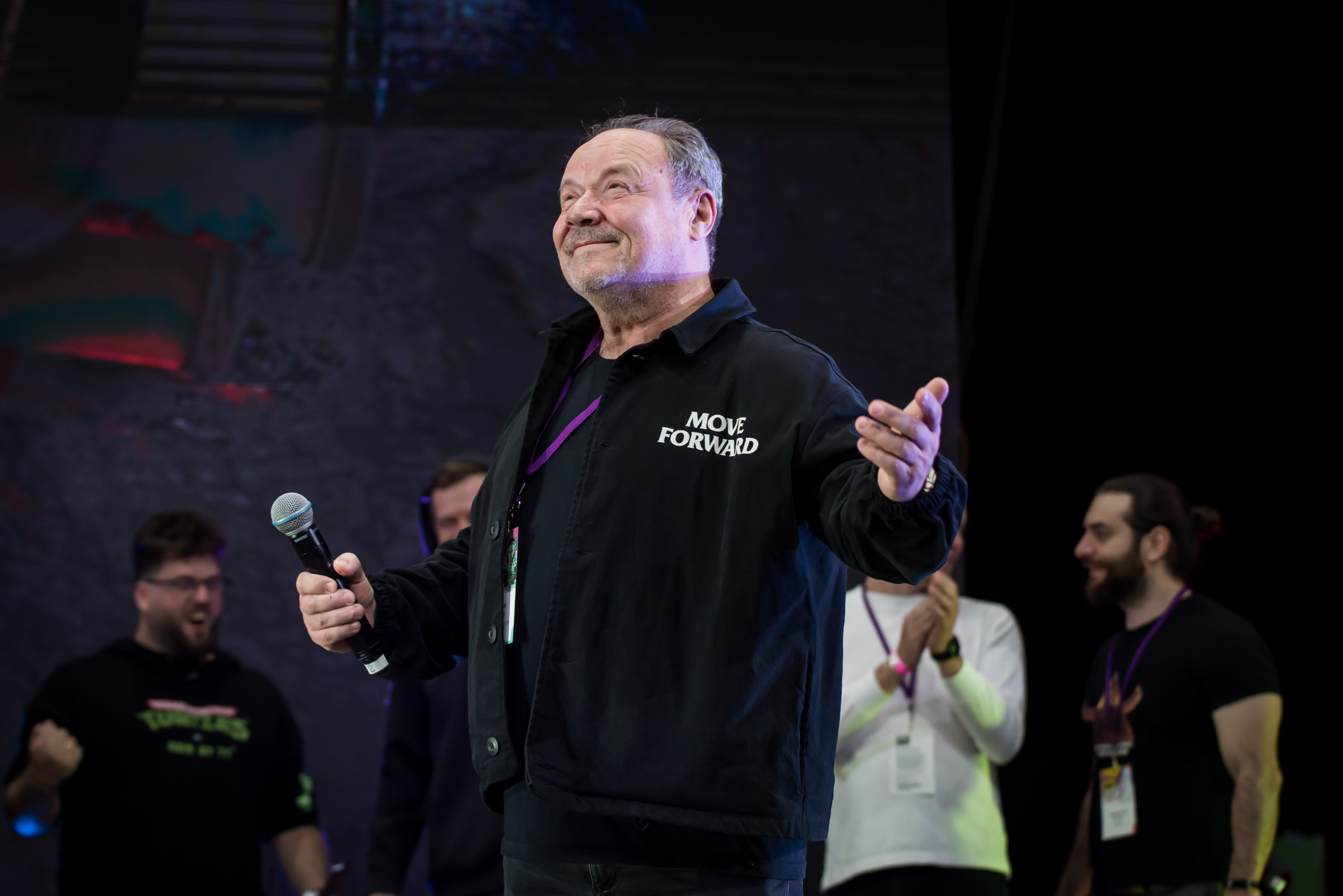
- Maklakov in 2023
- Born: Aleksei Konstantinovich Maklakov; 6 January 1961; Novosibirsk, RSFSR, USSR
- Citizenship: Soviet Union (until 1991); Russia
- Occupation: Actor
- Years active: 1980–present

Aleksei Konstantinovich Maklakov (Russian: Алексе́й Константи́нович Маклако́в; born 6 January 1961 in Novosibirsk) is a Soviet and Russian actor and singer. Well known in Russia for his starring role as Praporshchik Shmatko on the REN TV series Soldiers.

== Filmography ==
Film title	Original title	Year	Role	Notes
Moloch	Молох	1999	bit part	
Kamensakya: Death for the Sake of Death	Каменская: Смерть ради смерти	2000	Tomilin	
Hello, Little Boy!	Привет, Малыш!	2001	Little boy	
Gragdanin nachalnik	Гражданин начальник	2001		
Two Fates	Две судьбы	2002	Chajkin	
Azazel	АзаZель	2002		
Soldiers	Солдаты	2004	Praporshchik Shmatko	
Night Watch	Ночной дозор	2004	Semjon	
Ironheads	Парни из стали	2004	Mozhayskiy	
Viola Tarakanova	Виола Тараканова	2004		
Apocrypha: Music for Peter and Paul	Апокриф: Музыка для Петра и Павла	2004	Mozart	
Penal battalion	Штрафбат	2004		
Time to Gather Stones	Время собирать камни	2005	Commandant	
Don't Forget	Не забывай	2005	Squadron-leader	
Yesenin	Есенин	2005	Chagin	
Women bankers	Банкирши	2005		
Day Watch	Дневной дозор	2006	Semjon	
Women's Job with Deadly Risk	Женская работа с риском для жизни	2006		
Let's Be Familiar	Будем на ты	2006		
Queen's First Rule	Первое правило королевы	2006		
The Gromovs	Громовы	2006		
Officers	Офицеры	2006	Close combat instructor	
Dead, Alive, Dangerous	Мёртвый. Живой. Опасный.	2006		
Old Friend	Старая подруга	2006		
All frankly	Всё по-честному	2007	trainer Kovalyov	
Merciful	Милосердный	2007	Paramonov	
Platinum	Платина	2007		
Praporshchik Shmatko, or "Yo-moyo"	Прапорщик Шматко, или "Ё-моё"	2007	Shmatko	
Stupid Fat Hare	Тупой жирный заяц	2007	Arkady Sopelkin (Hare)	
Step by Step	Шаг за шагом	2007		
City of Brides	Город невест	2008		
Love yoke	Иго любви	2008	Paramonov	
After Life	После жизни	2008	Daniil	
Peace! Love! Chewing Gum!	Мир! Дружба! Жвачка!	2020-2023	Yury Poliektovych	
Major Grom: Plague Doctor	Майор Гром: Чумной Доктор	2021	Inspector Fedor Prokopenko	
Rodnina	Роднина	2025	Pavel Borisov	
Prostokvashino	Простоквашино	2026		
