= Comic-Con Russia =

Annual entertainment exhibition held in Moscow

- logos
- Status: Active
- Genre: Speculative fiction
- Venue: Timiryazev Centre
- Location: Moscow
- Country: Russia
- Inaugurated: 2–5 October 2014
- Most recent: 12–14 December 2025
- Organizer: Bubble Comics; MDTS LLC; Deep Media and Entertainment; Hyper PC; Hobby World; Studio Plus; Yandex
- Website: https://comiccon.ru/

Comic-Con Russia is a speculative fiction entertainment annual exhibition and fan convention of computer and video games, TV series and comic movies in Russia, organized by the committee of Russian Game Developers Conference and Bubble Comics. The first convention was held alongside the 2014 IgroMir.

From the beginning the showcasing primarily comic books and science fiction/fantasy related film, television, and similar popular arts, the convention includes a larger range of pop culture and entertainment elements across virtually all genres, including horror, animation, anime, manga, toys, collectible card games, video games, webcomics, and fantasy novels in the country.

The event for 2020 was postponed to October 2022 due to the COVID-19 pandemic, but the organiser "went silent" following the Russo-Ukrainian war. The parent event IgroMir was cancelled in 2022, leading to a lawsuit against the organizers over unreturned fees for the event.

In 2025, Comic-Con Russia returned, again as a combined event with IgroMir, but with a new event organizer and new venue.

== See also ==
- San Diego Comic-Con
- East European Comic Con
- Russian Game Developers Conference
- IgroMir
