= Russian Game Developers Conference =

Annual conference and awards presentation

Russian Game Developers Conference Конференция Разработчиков Игр
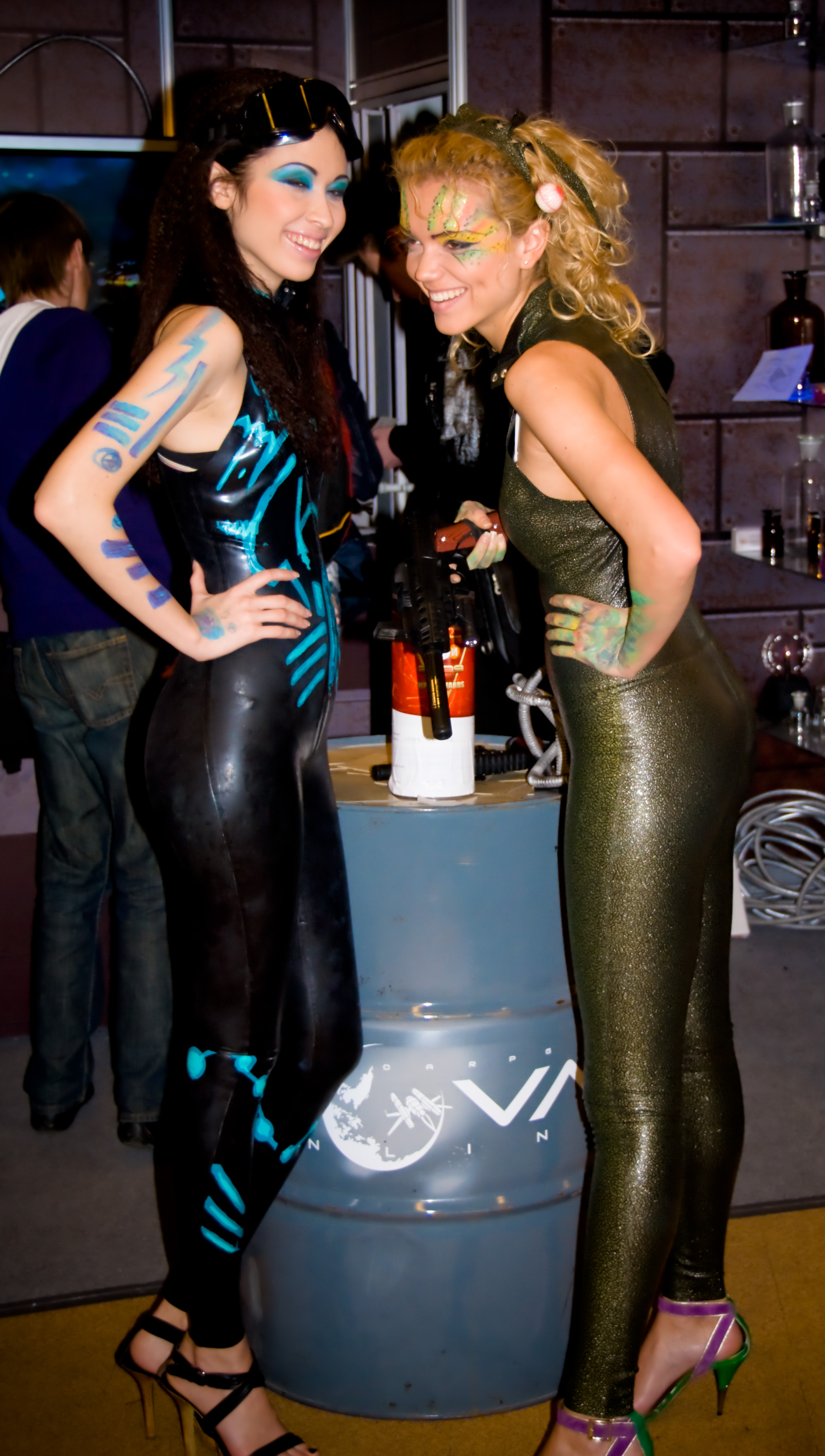
- Models at the KRI 2009
- Status: Defunct
- Genre: Event for industry professionals
- Frequency: Annually
- Inaugurated: 2003
- Most recent: 2014
- Website: Official website

The Russian Game Developers' Conference (Russian: Конференция Разработчиков Игр), or KRI (Russian: КРИ, romanized: KRI), was an annual event for industry professionals devoted to game development, publishing and distribution in Russia and surrounding territories. The show also featured the presentation of the annual KRI awards, a professional game awards. Attendance at KRI was relative compared with some of the better-known game developer conferences abroad. However, this was mainly attributed to the population densities in the enormous geographic range that the conference covered and the difficulties in transportation. Back then, Russian distribution video game networks were often plagued by software pirates. Due to the spread of digital distribution and the adoption Russian anti-piracy legislation, KRI grew each year, having been able to provide accommodation for attendants from afar. KRI also helped to establish and entrench various anti-piracy measures.

Starting with its inception in 2003, KRI quickly became Russia's leading video game trade show, offering developers a chance to share their experience, meet colleagues, and communicate their ideas and works to the professional public. KRI attracted industry representatives not only from ex-USSR countries, but also from abroad. Every annual KRI event was attended by renowned game developers that are known across the planet.

In 2014, KRI merged with the IgroMir exhibition.
