= Puck! Puck! =

1964 Soviet animated film

- A screenshot, showing Meteor team (in red suits) and Vimpel Team (in blue suits)
- Directed by: Boris Dyozhkin
- Written by: Alexander Kumma; Sakko Runge; Boris Dyozhkin
- Music by: Alexander Varlamov
- Distributed by: Soyuzmultfilm
- Release date: 1964
- Running time: 21 minutes
- Country: USSR
- Language: Russian

Puck! Puck!, also in English territories titled as Goal! Goal! (Russian: Шайбу! Шайбу, romanized: Shaybu! Shaybu!) is a Soviet animated film by Soyuzmultfilm studio directed by Boris Dyozhkin.

== Plot ==
An ice hockey match occurs between the Meteor team, the arrogant "masters" of hockey, and the Vimpel team, a friendly team of beginners. The first period passed with a predictable crushing score of 3-0 in favor of Meteor. During the break, the coach of the Vimpel team, explains his team the new tactics and sets the players up for victory. The second period leads to a turning point in the game. But the score is still in favor of Meteor, 4-2.

In the third period, one of Vimpel's hockey players was seriously injured and was unable to continue the game, which seemed to endanger the continuation of the match. The main character, an unnamed red-haired amateur hockey player comes to the aid of Vimpel. Despite the fact that immediately going out on the ice, he, in a fit of joy, makes an own goal. With his help the team wins with a score of 5-6.

== Reception ==
According to film critic and animation historian Pavel Shvedov, Boris Dyozhkin was the best in translating the theme of sports in Soviet animation. Shvedov believes that Dezhkin manages to convey the drama of sports competitions, the expression of a duel, the emotions of athletes and the public, which is facilitated by the musical accompaniment and sound recorded at a real hockey match. At the same time, such a tough, power game like hockey in Puck! Puck! appears in a completely different, "kind" image. "The viewer may not like hockey, but the author does not allow him to stay away from what is happening on the screen", concludes the critic. Film critic Sergey Kapkov, paying tribute to the technical and rhythmic perfection of the film, called Puck! Puck! the best in a series of works by Boris Dyozhkin on a sports theme.

== Sources ==
- Сергей Капков; Ирина Марголина; Наталья Лозинская (2006). "Борис Дёжкин". "Наши мультфильмы". Издательская программа «Интерроса». ISBN 5-91105-007-2. Archived from the original on 2007-08-29.
- Фильмы-сказки: сценарии рисованных фильмов. Выпуск 10 (65000 экз ed.). М.: Искусство. 1972. (1974 — второе издание — тираж 50 000 экз.) Кумма А., Рунге С. «Шайбу! Шайбу!».
