= Kinopoisk =

Russian film-related online database

- Website type: Specialty service
- Available in: Russian
- Headquarters: Moscow
- Owner: Yandex
- Creators: Vitaly Tatsiy; Dmitry Sukhanov
- Website: kinopoisk.ru
- Commercial: Yes
- Registration: Optional, but registration allows a user to use much more functions
- Launched: 7 November 2003; 22 years ago

Kinopoisk (Russian: Кинопоиск, a portmanteau of "cinema" and "search") is a Russian online database of information related to films, TV shows including cast, production team, biographies, plot summaries, ratings, and reviews. Since 2018 (as КиноПоиск HD) also a subscription video on demand streaming service with several thousand films, TV series, cartoons and including premieres and exclusive ones, has also been available.

== History ==
In 2013, Kinopoisk was purchased by Yandex, one of Russia's largest IT companies. In 2015, KinoPoisk underwent a total redesign. However, the new design was met with strong criticism by both users and the media for its inferior functionality and slower loading time. Within four days Yandex reverted the site to its former design. After that, new design features were introduced gradually.

By 2020s, Kinopoisk became Russia's major streaming service and started producing its own films and TV series, most notably Aeterna, The Last Minister, Grom: Boyhood, Others and Korol i Shut.

In 2023, Yandex partnered with the Kontinental Hockey League to acquire the rights for all KHL regular season and playoff games to be streamed on Kinopoisk.

== Features ==
Kinopoisk is one of the most popular movie portals of the Runet. The website has 93 million visits per month. Among the sites dedicated to films, it occupies the 3rd place in the world in terms of traffic, after IMDb and the Chinese Douban.

Like IMDB, the site has a list of the top 250 films based on user ratings. As of June 2023, the first places among feature films were occupied by The Green Mile, The Shawshank Redemption and Forrest Gump.

== Censorship ==
=== LGBT-related content moderation ===
Following the 2022 expansion of Russia's "propaganda" law and the Supreme Court's November 2023 designation of the "international LGBT movement" as extremist, Kinopoisk adjusted age ratings and removed visual materials from numerous titles. In December 2023, the platform assigned an 18+ rating to the children's animated series My Little Pony: Friendship Is Magic, a move explained by the service as stemming from "new legislative restrictions" on information disseminated among children.

In August 2025, Kinopoisk removed posters, trailers and stills from several LGBT-themed films—including Brokeback Mountain, Call Me by Your Name, Red, White & Royal Blue, Blue Is the Warmest Colour and Room in Rome—after an official demand from Roskomnadzor to delete information deemed to contain "propaganda of non-traditional sexual relations." For some titles, the plot synopsis was also removed, leaving only an 18+ marker and the title.

Kinopoisk has also faced fines for failing to apply 18+ warnings to films such as Bridget Jones's Diary. In July 2023, the Zamoskvoretsky District Court fined the service 1 million rubles, and further penalties followed. In August 2025, the Tagansky District Court imposed a 3 million ruble fine under Article 6.21.3 of the Administrative Code. In February 2026, a Moscow court ordered Kinopoisk to pay another 3.5 million rubles over similar charges.

=== Ukrainian films and parliamentary scrutiny ===
In April 2023, State Duma deputy Vitaly Milonov called on the prosecutor's office to check Kinopoisk over the presence of Ukrainian films and series on the platform—not to demand their immediate removal, but to establish where the royalties from their screenings were being directed. The initiative was prompted by the Ukrainian remake of the comedy Sex and Nothing Personal; Milonov argued that payments from such content could be funding hostile activities. Alexander Sholokhov, first deputy chair of the Duma's culture committee, backed the concern, stating that it was unacceptable for royalties to go toward "sponsoring, the acquisition of weapons." Milonov repeated similar calls in 2025, but these concerned the same audit rather than a new demand to delete the films.

In December 2025, Kinopoisk confirmed that it had removed five films and series during the year at the request of Roskomnadzor after the regulator identified "propaganda of non-traditional relations" in them.

== Business model and finances ==
Kinopoisk operates primarily on a subscription-based model as part of the Yandex Plus ecosystem, with the vast majority of its revenue coming from paid subscriptions rather than advertising or transactional rentals. In 2025, Kinopoisk generated 57.8 billion rubles in revenue, a 22% increase year-on-year, and maintained its position as Russia's largest streaming service with a market share of approximately 31–32%. The platform reported 18.5 million paying subscribers in 2025 (up 23% year-on-year), while its total user base reached 60 million.

The Russian online cinema market reached 189 billion rubles in 2025 (up 39%), with subscription video on demand (SVoD) accounting for 182.6 billion rubles and average revenue per user (ARPU) rising to 721 rubles. Kinopoisk's growth has been driven by platform updates, an expanding originals slate, and deeper integration with Yandex Plus, although the company has noted a slowdown in organic growth due to high penetration of paid subscriptions.

== International availability ==
Kinopoisk's streaming catalogue is geo-restricted and officially available only in a limited set of countries. According to Yandex's support documentation, films and series can be watched by subscription in Russia, Kazakhstan, Belarus, Azerbaijan, Armenia, Georgia, Kyrgyzstan, Moldova, and Uzbekistan. In Mongolia, Tajikistan, and Turkmenistan, only the encyclopedia functions of Kinopoisk are accessible, without streaming. The service does not officially operate in the European Union, the United States, or other major markets, and access from outside the supported regions is blocked at the IP level; Yandex states that it does not guarantee the operation of Kinopoisk via VPN. The limited geographic footprint reflects licensing agreements that restrict most content to Russia and selected CIS countries.
