= Artyom Gabrelyanov =

Russian entrepreneur and writer

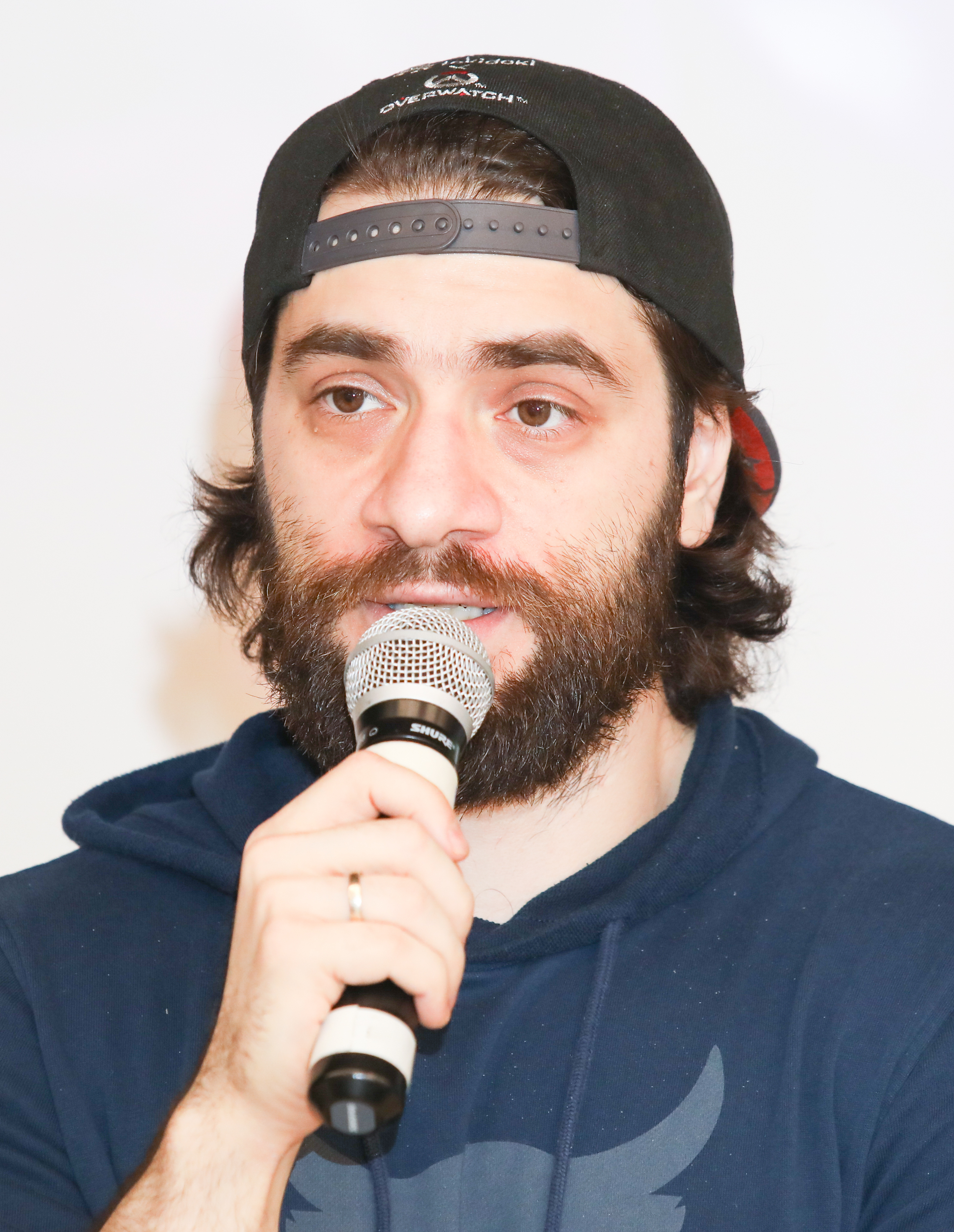
- Artyom Gabrelyanov at the Russian State Children's Library in 2021
- Born: February 9, 1987 (age 39) Ulyanovsk, Ulyanovsk Oblast, RSFSR, USSR
- Areas: Comic book writer; screenwriter; editor; publisher; producer

Artyom Aramovich Gabrelyanov (Note: Russian: Артём Ара́мович Габреля́нов) (born 9 February 1987) is a Russian entrepreneur, founder of Bubble Comics, screenwriter, journalist, producer, author of comics and graphic novels Major Grom, Demonslayer and others.

== Biography ==
Artyom Gabrelyanov was born in Ulyanovsk, in the family of Soviet journalists Aram Gabrelyanov and Galina Kolesova. In 1996, he moved to Moscow with his family. He is the older brother of the Russian businessman Ashot Gabrelyanov. In 2009 he graduated from Moscow State University at the Faculty of Journalism. By his own admission, he worked as a journalist since grade 11. He has written articles for Russian versions of FHM and Men’s Health magazines, as well as for Life news agency and for the Spidermedia.ru site. Gabrelyanov wanted to enter Gerasimov Institute of Cinematography in order to become a film director, but he was not accepted. Nevertheless, Gabrelyanov still wanted to create his own stories, so he began to engage in comics industry. The choice of comics was due to the fact that as art they are in many ways similar to cinema, but at the same time no big budget is needed.

=== Bubble Comics ===
He founded Bubble Comics in 2011 as a division of News Media Holdings. In the same year he published the Bubble magazine, which contained satirical comics parodying social life, politics and show business. His father, Aram Gabrelyanov and the founder of News Media Holdings, invested in the magazine, but the magazine did not gain much popularity and was published for less than a year. Subsequently, Aram justified the failure with the magazine by "life experience". After that, Artyom Gabrelyanov decided that the publishing house should abandon humorous comics in favor of adventure and superhero ones.

After the release of the Major Grom comic, which was written by Gabrelyanov, some critics began to accuse Bubble of pro-Kremlin propaganda, since the main villain of the first story arc of the comic, the serial killer Plague Doctor, kills corrupt officials and businessmen, leaves white ribbons (it was the symbol of anti-government protests) at his murders' sites, and amid protests based on 2011–2013 Russian protests, the public in the comics begins to consider him a hero. Even Aram Gabrelyanov, who is well-known for his pro-Kremlin position, was worried at the time that his son was denigrating the Russian opposition in the comic. Artyom, in response to the accusations, said that when he was developing the image of the Plague Doctor, he did not plan to make him such a notorious villain, and the white ribbon was added to the plot "by accident, for fun, and for provocation, of course." According to him, he noticed that the readers liked the Plague Doctor more than Igor Grom, the protagonist of the series, and felt that he was "taking the reader in the wrong direction," and therefore decided to make him such a villain who would not be sympathetic: a maniac who wanted take advantage of peaceful protests and stage a bloody coup d'état. In later issues of Major Grom, he chose not to touch on political topics.

=== Bubble Studios and film adaptations ===
Artyom Gabrelyanov, together with Bubble Comics editor-in-chief Roman Kotkov, planned to create film adaptations of their own comics from the very beginning of publication. The company began the process of developing the first film adaptation based on its own comics. According to Gabrelyanov, he received offers from TV companies and producers, although Bubble decided to create the film on its own in order to have full control over the creative process. Gabrelyanov also noted the experience of Marvel: before creating its own film division, Marvel Comics sold licenses for its characters to third-party film studios, but later they decided to engage in the creation of film adaptations on their own, founding Marvel Studios. Bubble planned to do the same.

Following the example of Marvel, Bubble decided to start its own film division, Bubble Studios, which would be responsible for making films based on the publisher's comics. The company developed a schedule for several years ahead, according to the results of which the film studio had to shoot seven adaptations of comics in ten years. Before starting to create full-length films, Gabrelyanov considered it necessary, first of all, to try the capabilities of the studio in the short film, making the first project of Bubble Studios the Major Grom short film, originally planned for seven minutes long.

== Filmography ==
- Major Grom (2017) – short film
- Major Grom: Paper Airplanes (2017) – teaser trailer
- Major Grom: Plague Doctor (2021) – feature-length film
