= List of Russian assassination attempts since 2022 =

Wikimedia list article

This is a list of unsuccessful assassination attempts that have been attributed to the Russian state since February 2022. (Note: The list includes cases in which a government, prosecutor or law enforcement agency has publicly accused Russian state actors or people acting on their behalf. These do not include death related to conventional warfare.) Killings and deaths that were carried out are covered in the list of Russian assassinations and suspicious Russia-related deaths since 2022.

== Background ==
Since 2014, Russia has been linked to assassinations and assassination attempts abroad, including the poisoning of Sergei Skripal in 2018 and the killing of Zelimkhan Khangoshvili in 2019.

Western intelligence officials have said that a Russian campaign of targeted killings has intensified since the full-scale invasion of Ukraine in February 2022. These campaigns take place inside of Ukraine as well as in the United Kingdom, Europe and the United States. Most of these plots made public by Western officials have been foiled. By May 2026, at least 20 people had been detained, charged or identified by authorities as involved in such plots in Europe over the preceding year. Russia has denied carrying out targeted killings abroad.

== Agencies involved ==
Both Russia's military intelligence agency (GRU) and the Federal Security Service (FSB) have been linked to numerous acts of sabotage, assassinations and assassination attempts against the Russian government's perceived political opponents.

GRU Unit 29155 is a covert unit known for its involvement in foreign assassinations and destabilization activities across Europe. The unit is thought to have operated in secret since at least 2008, though its existence only became publicly known in 2019.

According to an investigation by The Insider and Der Spiegel, a new assassination unit staffed by GRU and FSB personnel, Center 795 (Military Unit 75127), was created by order of the Russian General Staff in December 2022.

== Alleged assassination attempts ==
Date	Target	Country	Details
June 2022	Christo Grozev and Roman Dobrokhotov	United Kingdom	A British court convicted six Bulgarian nationals of spying for Russia directed by Jan Marsalek, which surveilled the two journalists and planned to abduct Dobrokhotov; prosecutors said members of the network had also discussed various methods of killing Grozev.
August 2022	Oleksii Reznikov and Kyrylo Budanov	Ukraine	The Security Service of Ukraine (SBU) said it had detained two men in Kovel, one of them a former member of the Russian-backed Luhansk People's Militia, who had been recruited by Russia's GRU to kill the defense minister and the head of military intelligence; one was convicted of treason in 2023 and sentenced to 12 years.
December 2022 – April 2024	Volodymyr Zelenskyy	Poland	Polish Internal Security Agency convicted a Polish man for helping Russian military intelligence plan an assassination of Zelenskyy by gathering information on security at Rzeszów–Jasionka Airport. He was convicted of espionage and sentenced five and a half years.
First half of 2024	Armin Papperger (Rheinmetall CEO)	Germany	US intelligence had uncovered a Russian government plan to assassinate the Rheinmetall chief executive, which was disrupted with German authorities. No suspects were publicly identified and the Kremlin denied the report.
February – October 2024	Oleh Syniehubov and Viacheslav Zadorenko	Ukraine	Ukrainian prosecutors said a man acting for the FSB participated in multiple plots, including a car bomb that was found, information gathering, and shooting a soldier.
May 2024	Volodymyr Zelenskyy, Kyrylo Budanov and Vasyl Malyuk	Ukraine	The SBU said two Ukrainian colonels of the State Security Administration had been recruited by the FSB to find members of Zelenskyy's security detail willing to kill him, as well as Budanov and Malyuk.
Summer 2024 – March 2025	Ruslan Gabbasov and Valdas Bartkevičius	Lithuania	Lithuanian prosecutors said they foiled a plan to murder two activists in Vilnius, and charged 13 people from Belarus, Georgia, Greece, Latvia, Moldova and Russia; Lithuania's criminal police chief blamed the Russian state.
September 2024	Dmytro Gordon	Ukraine	The SBU said an FSB network in Kyiv planned to kill the journalist and were offered $400,000 by Russia.
1 May 2025	Serhii Sternenko	Ukraine	A 45-year-old woman shot and wounded Sternenko outside his home in Kyiv; the woman's attorney said her handler who instructed to kill him said he worked with the FSB.
June 2025 – September 2026	Garry Kasparov and Ilya Ponomarev	United States; Lithuania	The United States Department of Justice charged five men, a former Russian intelligence colonel, his son, an FSB officer, and two Cuban nationals and a Venezuelan national, with conspiring to have a dissident in the Washington area and an exile near Vilnius killed for money.
Summer 2025	Pyotr Verzilov	Serbia	According to Artist Rita Flores, her FSB handlers told her to lure the activist and former Pussy Riot and Voina Group member to Serbia so that he could be abducted and killed, offering her up to 3 million rubles.
July 2025	Serhii Filimonov	Ukraine	The SBU said a plot was stopped where an FSB agent pretending to be SBU convinced a former Ukrainian soldier to kill the Da Vinci Wolves commander.
December 2025	Denis Kapustin	Ukraine	The Ukrainian Main Intelligence Directorate (HUR) reported having staged Kapustin's assassination and received a $500,000 bounty allocated for the task by Russian special services.
February 2026	Andriy Yusov and other public figures	Ukraine; Moldova	Ukrainian authorities said a network acting on Russia's orders planned contract killings of senior Ukrainian public figures for up to $100,000 each. Ten suspects were arrested in Ukraine and Moldova.
March 2026	Serhii Sternenko and Ilya Bogdanov	Ukraine	The SBU said a GRU-run group led by a man living in Poltava planned to kill the two with car bombs or by shooting, and that the alleged hitman was killed while resisting arrest. Bogdanov is an ex-FSB agent that defected to Ukraine.
31 July 2026	Ihor Obolienskyi	Ukraine	President Zelenskyy said the commander of the Khartiia corps had survived an assassination attempt in Kharkiv by a 69-year-old local man, who was detained with an accomplice.
31 July 2026	Hennadii Druzenko	Ukraine	The SBU said a 19-year-old from Mykolaiv recruited by the FSB went to an ambush site in Kyiv Oblast with a silenced pistol to kill the activist.
August 2026	Kyivstoner (Slevin Dadyan)	Poland	Polish Prime Minister Donald Tusk said a 29 year old Russian citizen recruited by Russian intelligence services had been arrested in Warsaw before he could carry out the killing of the American-Ukrainian citizen.
September 2026	Akhmad Akhmedov (K-1 federation)	Ukraine	The SBU said a woman from occupied Melitopol, trained at an FSB facility, entered Ukraine through Belarus to shoot the Russian opposition figure, who had fought for Ukraine since 2022.
September 2026	Kyivstoner (Slevin Dadyan)	Denmark	Denmark's security service PET said two Danish men, arrested with pistols and knives, had planned on behalf of Russian intelligence to kill the rapper at a concert. This followed an earlier attempt in Poland in August 2026. Denmark expelled the Russian defense attaché in response.

== See also ==
- List of Russian assassinations
- Suspicious Russia-related deaths since 2022
- Assassination attempts on Volodymyr Zelenskyy
- Russian sabotage operations in Europe
- Russian hybrid warfare
- GRU Unit 29155
