= Peter Ruzavin =

Russian journalist and Ukrainian National Guard soldier

- Пётр Петрович Рузавин
- Born: June 5, 1991 (age 35); Moscow, Russia
- Citizenship: Russian
- Education: Moscow State University (2013)
- Occupations: Journalist; soldier
- Years active: 2009–present
- Known for: Reporting on Russo-Ukrainian war; serving as drone operator with 2nd Khartia Corps (Ukraine)
- Spouse: Nataliya Gumenyuk (m. 2017)
- Awards: Redkollegia prize (2022)

Peter Ruzavin (Russian: Пётр Петрович Рузавин; born June 5, 1991) is a Russian journalist and soldier serving in the 2nd Corps of the Ukrainian National Guard.

== Early life and education ==
Ruzavin was born in Russia and grew up in Moscow.

== Career ==
=== Television and investigative journalism ===
Ruzavin began his journalism career at the age of 18 as a reporter and TV Host at TV Rain.

He contributed to Meduza, Projekt, Mediazona, and the Organized Crime and Corruption Reporting Project, with his focus on Russian prisoners, protests, and critique of the Russian government.

On 19 May 2014, he was detained by "Crimean self-defence" forces while reporting on the Russian occupation of Crimea for TV Rain and subjected to violence before being released.

He held two fellowships at Institute for Human Sciences in 2022 and 2023.

=== Reporting from Russo-Ukrainian War ===
In February 2022, after the beginning of Russia's full-scale invasion of Ukraine, he was one of few Russian journalists permanently based in Ukraine.

He conducted interviews with Russian prisoners of war in Ukrainian captivity.

In 2022, he wrote a number of field reports for Mediazona. His reporting on Kupiansk won the Redkollegia Prize and was shortlisted for the Journalism as a Profession awards.

He produced a podcast with Nataliya Gumenyuk covering the first months after the full-scale invasion, and launched a telegram channel collecting images of antiwar actions across Russia.

== Military service ==
According to Ruzavin, he questioned the effectiveness of his journalism, and decided to enlist in 2023. He wanted to choose a Ukrainian Brigade rather than a separate unit for foreigners.

In May 2024, he joined the 13th Khartiia Brigade, 2nd Corps, National Guard of Ukraine as a drone operator.

In Summer 2024, Ruzavin was injured, sustaining a leg wound from an explosion, while a fellow soldier was seriously wounded (neck and head) in the same incident. According to M. Gessen, he returned to service within weeks and received a medal for the incident.

On June 19, 2026, Ruzavin was added to the list of Foreign Agents in Russia.

== Personal life ==
In August 2017, Ruzavin was married to Ukrainian journalist Nataliya Gumenyuk.
