= 13th Khartiia Brigade =

Ukrainian special police unit

Khartiia Brigade
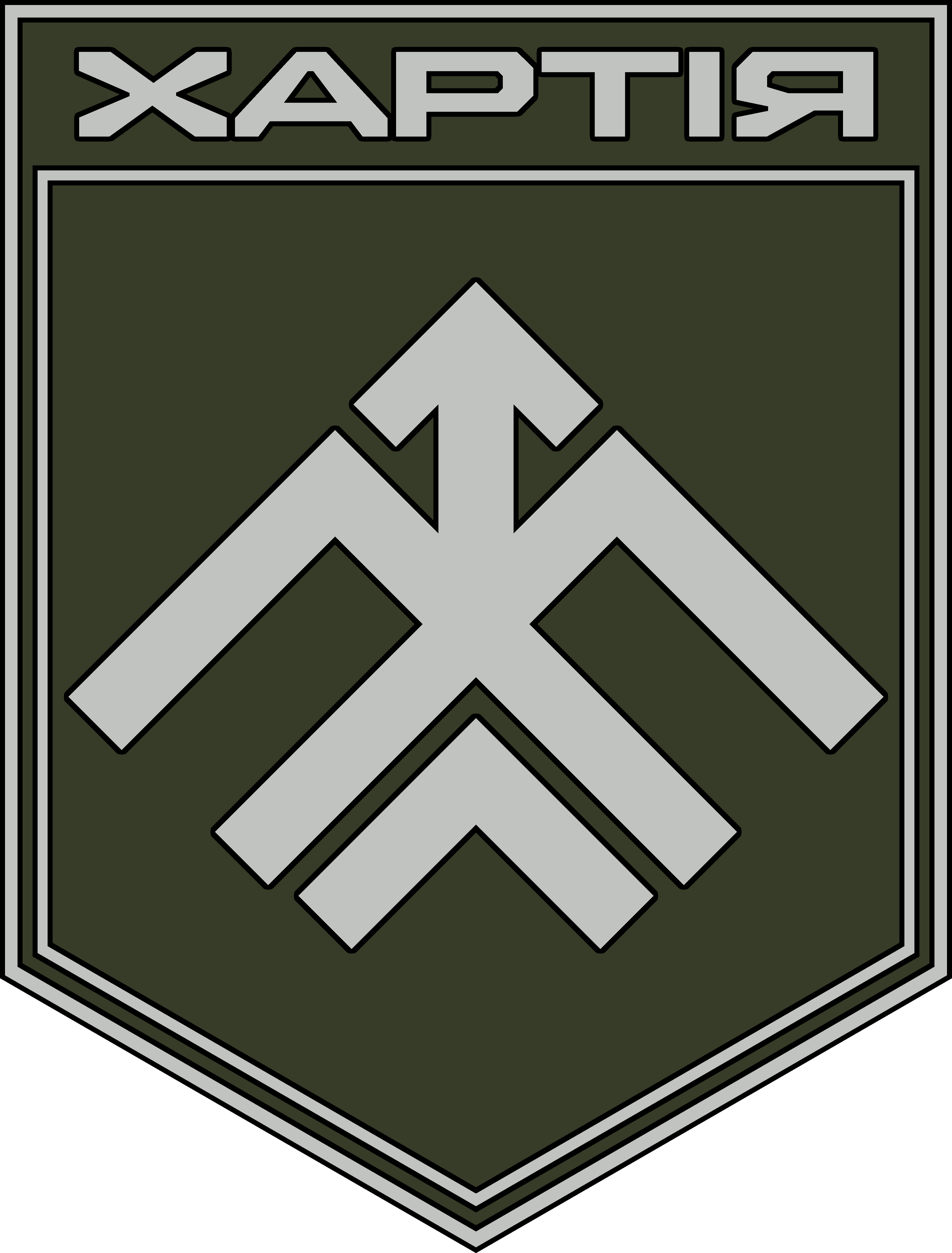
- Sleeve patch of the Brigade
- Active: March 19, 2022 – present
- Country: Ukraine
- Branch: National Guard of Ukraine
- Role: Offensive Guard
- Size: Brigade
- Part of: 2nd Khartia Corps
- Garrison/HQ: Kharkiv, Kharkiv Oblast
- Engagements: Russian invasion of Ukraine; Eastern Ukraine campaign; 2022 Kharkiv counteroffensive; 2024 Kharkiv offensive
- Website: www.khartiia.org x.com/khartiia_eng?s=09

Commanders
- Current commander: Major Daniel “Cuba” Kitone
- Notable commanders: Vsevolod Kozhemyako; Colonel Ihor Obolienskyi

Insignia
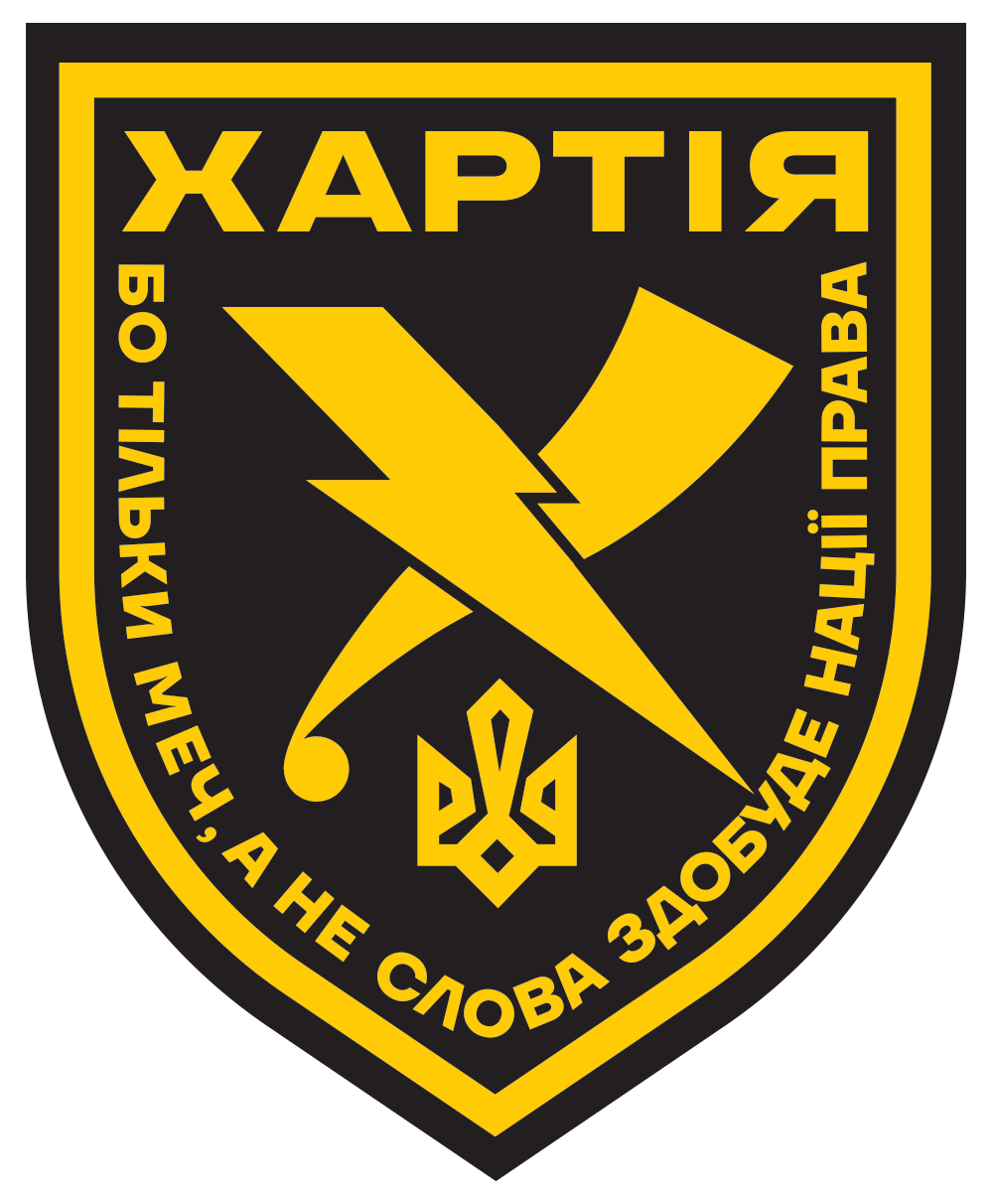
- Patch when unit was battalion size

The 13th Khartiia Operational Brigade (Ukrainian: 13-та бригада оперативного призначення «Хартія», also spelled Khartia) is a combat brigade of the National Guard of Ukraine that was formed in 2022.

Khartiia was founded by volunteers to defend against Russian offensives from the Kharkiv region. It has also seen action in Bakhmut, Soledar, Ocheretyne, and Serebryansky Forest. In 2023 Khartiia was reformed as a brigade of the National Guard of Ukraine. In April 2025 the 13th National Guard Khartiia Brigade was assigned to lead the newly organized Second Corps.

== History ==
Ukrainian businessman Vsevolod Kozhemyako, CEO of the Agrotrade Group, founded Khartiia at the outset of the Russian full-scale invasion of Ukraine. The unit was formed in March 2022 by volunteers. Initially it was a part of the 127th Territorial Defense Brigade.

Ihor "Cornet" Obolienskyi, a National Guard of Ukraine colonel who rejoined the army in 2022 after a three-year stint in business, led Khartiia's military development.

Vsevolod [Kozhemyako] called me and proposed to join our forces, recalls the Khartiia commander Obolienskyi about the start of the full-scale war. I would be responsible for the troop, and he would manage and organize the unit. So we had this great synergy from the very beginning.

In spring 2022 Khartiia fought off the Russian invaders near Kharkiv and liberated Ruska Lozova, alongside other Ukrainian forces. Khartiia was one of the first Ukrainian units to reach the border with Russia during the counteroffensive in the Kharkiv region in September 2022.

In December 2022 Khartiia was the only Ukrainian volunteer unit in the Battle of Bakhmut.

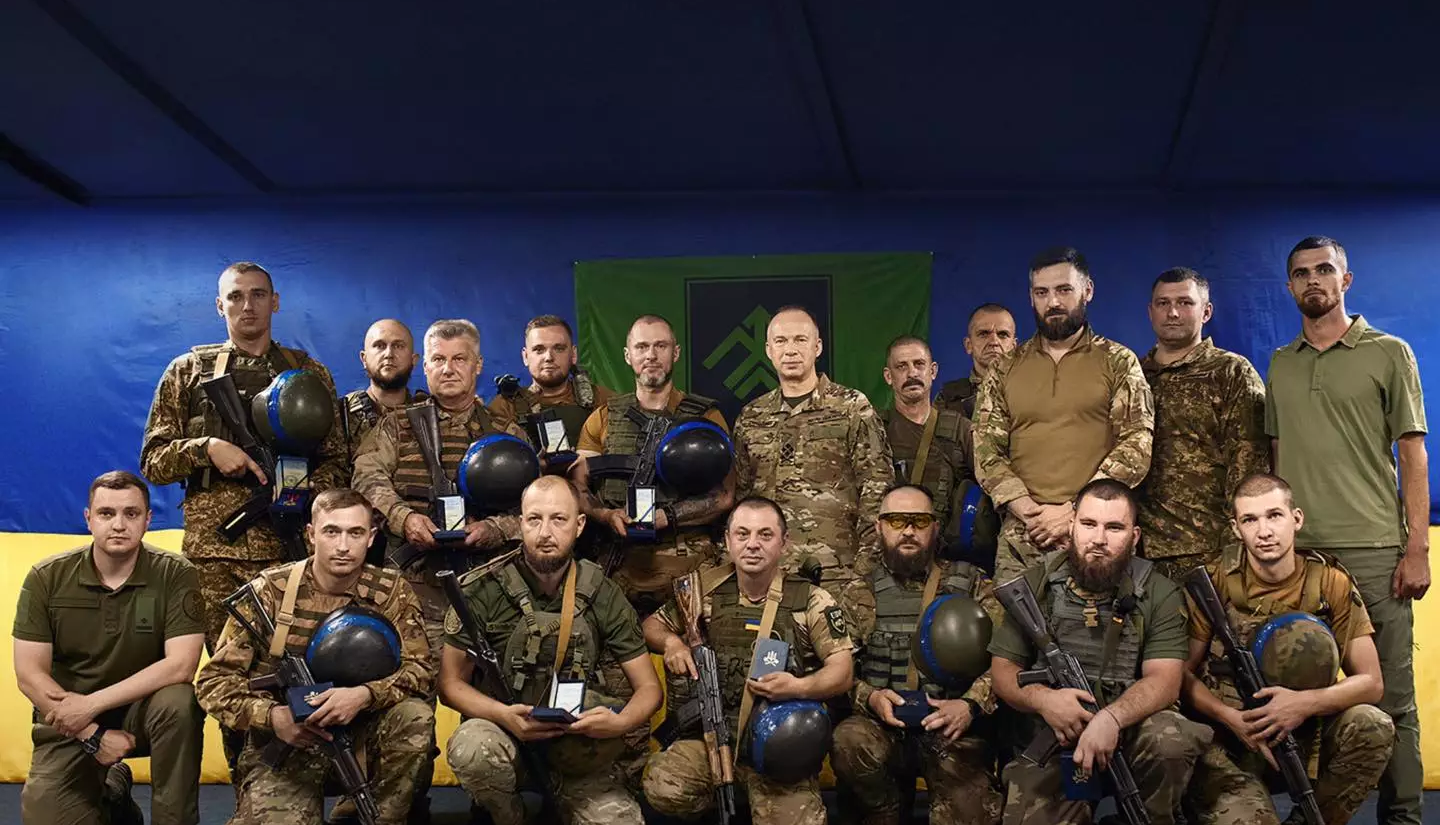
Khartiia fighters with Oleksandr Syrskyi, commander of the Armed Forces of Ukraine

In 2023 Khartiia was reformed as a brigade of the National Guard of Ukraine, less than a year after it was founded. Early May 2024 saw the brigade fighting in Ocheretyne and Serebryansky Forest.

Khartiia has kept their focus on the defense of Kharkiv. In May 2024, the brigade was redeployed from the Donetsk region to the Lyptsi direction. Khartiia's fighters stopped the massive Russian attack on Kharkiv. They faced what brigade commanders called waves of "meat assaults" as dozens of Russian troops would attack positions daily. In October 2024 Russia launched a resumed offensive in Kharkiv. The brigade captured seven Russian soldiers and a howitzer. As of December 2024, the brigade was still positioned on the front lines in Kharkiv Oblast.

The brigade has also been on the forefront of advancing new technologies on the battlefield. In December 2024, Khartiia Brigade released footage of robotically controlled ground combat vehicles laying anti-tank mines. This was part of the first fully robotic ground combat operation in history. The brigade has multiple success stories employing unmanned ground vehicles, such as the Tarhan, Tor, and Zmii for CASEVAC. The Brigade has also advanced anti-drone technology and Ukrainian-made radio technologies utilizing mesh networks.

Two new corps were announced in April 2025 as part of a reorganization of the AFU. Commanders from Azov and Khartiia were chosen to lead the new corps. In February 2025 President Zelenskyy announced Ukraine's Armed Forces would reorganize into a corps structure.

In May 2025, the brigade announced that it had recaptured lost positions north of the village of Lyptsi in northern Kharkiv Oblast in cooperation with Ukraine's 92nd Assault Brigade. In the same month, the Brigade also announced the formation of an air defense battalion equipped with anti-drone technology.

== Structure ==
As of 2026 the brigade structure is as follows:

- 2nd Corps of the National Guard of Ukraine "Khartia"
  - 13th Khartiia Brigade
    - Unit HQ
    - 1st Battalion of Operational Assignment
    - 2nd Battalion of Operational Assignment
    - 3rd Battalion of Operational Assignment
    - 4th Battalion of Operational Assignment
    - Tank Company
    - Reconnaissance Battalion
    - Artillery Battalion "Dracarys"
    - Anti-Aircraft Defense Battalion
    - Logistics Battalion
    - Signal Company
    - Patronage Service

== Commanders ==
- Khartiia volunteer unit founder – Vsevolod Kozhemyako (2022—2023)
- Khartiia brigade commander – Ihor Obolienskyi (since 2023)
- Khartiia chief of staff – Colonel Maksym Holubok (since 2023)
- Major Daniel “Cuba” Kitone (since 2025)

== Mission planning and NATO interoperability ==
Khartiia's motto is “We're building the new Ukrainian army”. The brigade uses the protocols of military decision-making process (MDMP) and troop leading procedures (TLP), as well as modern SOPs (standard operating procedures). Khartiia conducts after-action reviews to analyze the result and performance of every mission. The unit also uses the NATO-standard S-structure of the brigade staff. “We’re here to set a new example and build the new Ukrainian armed forces. Taking care of our fighters, military planning according to NATO standards and modern management methods – that's what Khartiia stands for,” the brigade states.

== Recruitment ==
Khartiia launched its first recruiting campaign in 2023. “[We] guarantee 60 days of military training” was the campaign's slogan. The brigade's commander Ihor Obolienskyi, military medic Kalyna and the ISTAR unit head Bit were chosen to be the faces of the next recruitment drive.

In 2024 the prominent Ukrainian poet, novelist, musician and a long-time Khartiia supporter Serhiy Zhadan joined the ranks of the brigade. Ukrainian historian and the Istorychna Pravda website editor-in-chief Vakhtang Kipiani joined up in 2024.

In July 2024 the French philosopher and writer Bernard-Henri Levy paid a visit to the Khartia fighters. In September 2024 the historian Timothy Snyder visited Khartiia in the Kharkiv region. In October 2024 the brigade welcomed the minister of defense of the Netherlands Ruben Brekelmans.

== Traditions and symbols ==
Serhiy Zhadan proposed the name Khartiia, combining the term "charter" in Ukrainian with "Kharkiv", the unit's hometown.

Zhadan wrote the official anthem of the brigade, performing it with his band Zhadan and Sobaky.

The Khartiia emblem is a variation of the coat of arms of the Kharkiv Sloboda Cossack Regiment, a bow with an arrow, tightly drawn. It also contains a stylized letter "X", which refers both to the name of the unit and to its origins in Kharkiv.

== Memorialization ==
The Khartiia patronage service was formed in 2024. Its mission is to take care of the wounded soldiers and support the families of the fighters killed in action.
