= Nataliya Gumenyuk =

Ukrainian journalist and author

Nataliya Gumenyuk Наталія Гуменюк
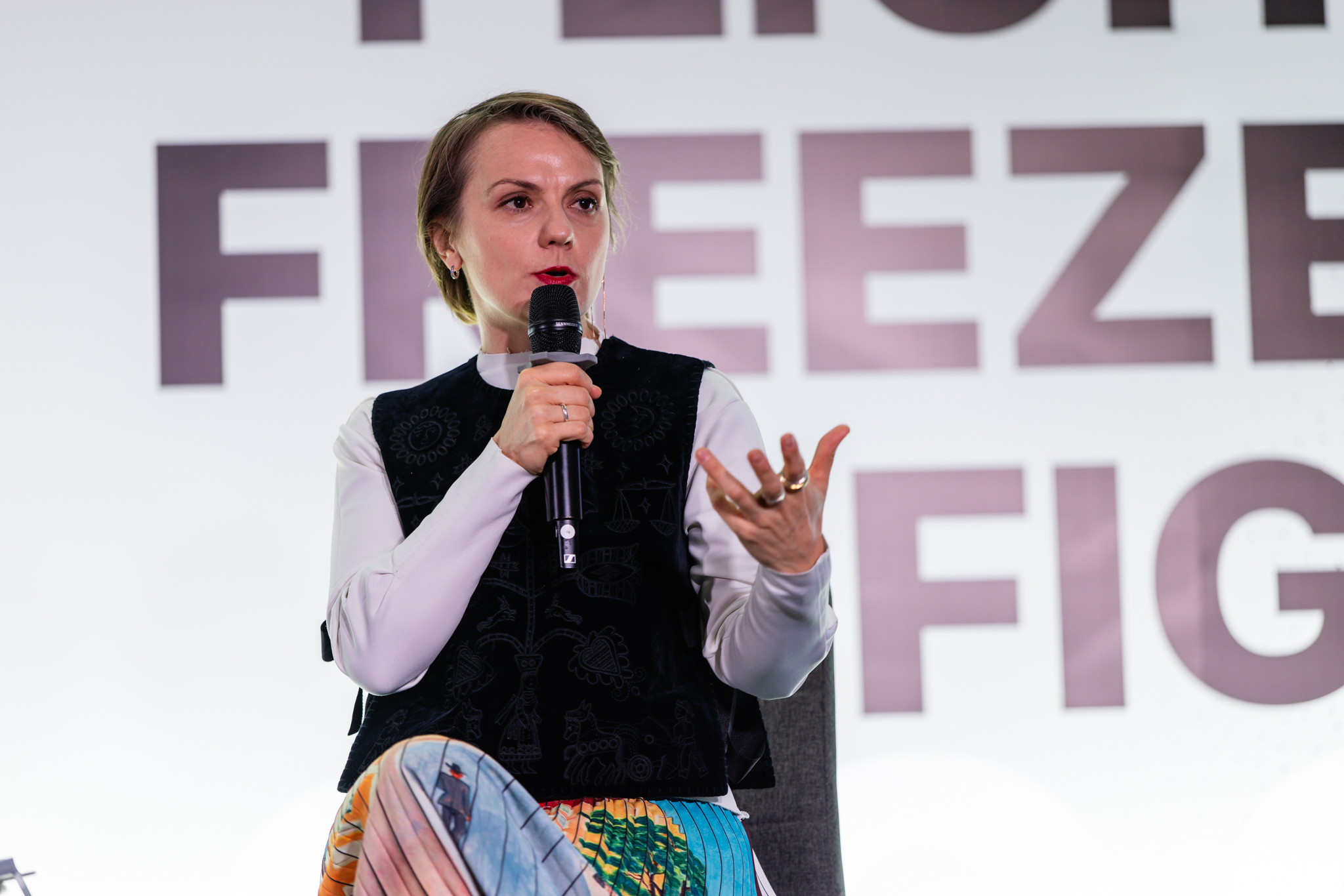
- Nataliya Gumenyuk in 2026
- Born: 21 July 1983 (age 43); Birobidzhan, Russian SFSR, USSR
- Citizenship: Ukrainian
- Education: Taras Shevchenko National University of Kyiv; Örebro University
- Occupations: journalist; writer; researcher
- Organization: Public Interest Journalism Lab
- Spouse: Peter Ruzavin (m. 2017)
- Awards: Free Media Award
- Website: Author on the Atlantic

Nataliya Petrivna Gumenyuk (Ukrainian: Наталія Петрівна Гуменюк; alternate Romanization: Nataliia Humeniuk; born 1983)is a Ukrainian author, journalist, documentary filmmaker, public intellectual, focused on conflict reporting, global affairs, and human rights. She is a co-founder and CEO of the Public Interest Journalism Lab, and a co-founder of the independent media Hromadske. She is the author of several books, including The Lost Island: Tales from the Occupied Crimea (2020).

== Early life and education ==
Nataliya Gumenyuk was born in Birobidzhan in 1983. She graduated with a bachelor's degree from the Institute of Journalism of Taras Shevchenko National University of Kyiv (Kyiv National University; KNU) (2000–2004). She earned a master's degree in international journalism from Örebro University, Sweden (2005–2006).

== Career ==
Gumenyuk took the course "International Media Systems" at the Mohyla School of Journalism in Kyiv. From 2002 to 2004, she was the editor-in-chief of the independent student newspaper Nasha Sprava. In 2002–2003, she was an international journalist on Novyi Kanal. Also in 2003, she was an international journalist for 5 Kanal. In 2003–2004, she was an international journalist for the fact-check program ICTV. In 2004, she worked for the "ProfiTV News Agency". In 2005–2007, she was the head of the international department, a special correspondent for the "K1" TV channel and the author and host of the "One Reportage" program.

From 2007 to the end of 2009, she headed the international department of the INTER TV channel and also served as a special correspondent. Towards the end of this period, in 2009, for the first time among Ukrainian TV channels, INTER was nominated for an Emmy Award in the News category for its coverage of the South Ossetian War (reporter Ruslan Yarmolyuk). In 2009, Gumenyuk also did an internship at BBC World News on HARDtalk and at The Guardian and The Independent.

At the end of 2009, she was fired from the INTER TV channel without explanation. This caused a wave of outrage among her colleagues, who collected more than 70 signatures against her release. After that, some journalists resigned of their own free will (including Roman Vintonov). Afterwards, she did not get a job in other media and became a freelancer.

In 2010–2011, Gumenyuk was the editor-in-chief of the project "Ours" (INTER, studio "07 Production") whose focus was on fifteen TV programs about Ukrainians who left Ukraine for various reasons and became successful abroad, including in Norway, Brazil, South Africa, India, China, among others. Gumenyuk took part in the search for sponsors of the project.

=== Covering the Arab Spring ===
After "Ours", Nataliya began a trip at her own expense to cover the events of the Arab Spring. As a result of the trip she wrote a book “The Maidan Tahrir. In Search of The Lost Revolution”.

She worked as an international freelancer mainly for Ukrainian publications, such as The Ukrainian Week, Ukrayinska Pravda, Esquire Ukraine, studio 1+1, radio Voice of the Capital, as well as for some foreign media, such as OpenDemocracy Russia (UK), RTL-Netherlands, and M6 (France).

=== Work on Hromadske TV ===
In 2013, Gumenyuk became one of the initiators for the creation of the independent online media Hromadske TV. She ran the project "Hromadske International", an English-language version of Hromadske TV. In May 2015, she was elected a head of the NGO "Hromadske TV". In February 2020, Nataliya resigned from Hromadske to show disagreement with the non-renewal of a contract with the editor-in-chief of Hromadske, Angelina Kariakina.

While working on Hromadske she had focused on reporting the war in Eastern Ukraine, occupation of Crimea, and also international relations. She was also the host of The Sunday Show, an English-language project explaining Eastern Europe for international audiences. In February 2020, she published the book The Lost Island: Tales From Occupied Crimea based on 6 years of trips to the occupied peninsula. It has been translated into Russian and German.

=== Launch of the Public Interest Journalism Lab ===
In 2020, Nataliya Gumenyuk and other Ukrainian journalists and communications specialists founded Public Interest Journalism Lab, an experimental laboratory and interdisciplinary coalition of sociologists, researchers, and media professionals that promotes constructive discussion around complex social issues. PIJL conducted its previous research in partnership with the Kharkiv Institute for Social Research, Lviv Media Forum, and the Arena Program, co-directed by Peter Pomerantsev and Anne Applebaum.

Since the Russian invasion of Ukraine in 2022, the Lab has been focused on covering events in Ukraine for the international and Ukrainian media, documenting war crimes, and co-founded The Reckoning Project: The Reckoning Project: Ukraine Testifies, and creating an online chronicle of Ukrainian resistance as part of the Life in War project. Within The Reckoning Project, Anne Applebaum and Nataliya Gumenyuk wrote an article for The Atlantic on how Russian invaders unleashed violence on small-town residents.

Gumenyuk has reported from major areas affected by the Russian invasion: the town of Bucha, and the Kharkiv, Mykolaiv, and Kherson cities and regions.

Within its work on war crimes documentation, under Gumenyuk’s leadership PIJL created over a dozen documentary films devoted to the Russian war devoted to the explosion of Kakhovka Dam, attacks on the firefighters and rescue workers, and the resilience of Ukrainian children who survived the attacks.

Based on verified witness testimonies from The Reckoning Project detailing the Russian war in Ukraine, The Reckoning documentary was staged by Dash Arts, which ran at London's Arcola Theatre from May 29 to June 28, 2025.

The PIJL team started to work on the issues of the preservation of the memory, which included a number of the exhibitions within 2024 the Kyiv Biennale in Berlin.

=== Other activities and cultural projects ===
In 2020–2021 Gumenyuk focused on media research, as well as producing a number of documentaries. 'The Gongadze Case as a Mirror of an Epoch' is a documentary multimedia project released on the 20th anniversary of the "tape scandal" that unfolded after the murder of journalist Georgiy Gongadze.

Nataliya Gumeyuk was the head, producer, and editor-in-chief of the multimedia documentary project Our 30 years dedicated to the history of the 1990s presented by Ukrainians themselves. This project was produced by the Public Interest Journalism Lab team to mark the 30th anniversary of Ukraine's independence. As a result, 9 documentaries, 20 podcasts, special projects, and dozens of short video testimonies of that time were released on the air and on the platforms of the Public Broadcaster of Ukraine. Gumenyuk co-authored the film on the return of the Crimean Tatars from deportation.

In 2023, Nataliya Gumenyuk became the curator of the focus theme of the 11th International Book Arsenal Festival. She has chosen "When Everything Matters” as focus theme.

Nataliya Gumenyuk has decided to open the festival events with a performance by the “Renaissance” Chamber Orchestra of the Mariupol Chamber Philharmonic, the collective that survived the 2002 siege of Mariupol.

On top of several events and discussions, the exhibition of The Reckoning Project documentaries had been running during the Festival.

Gumenyuk is a member of the Council for Freedom for Speech Under the President of Ukraine, as well as the Independent Media Council.

== Personal life ==
Nataliya Gumenyuk is married to Peter Ruzavin, a Russian by origin, who voluntarily joined the Defense Forces of Ukraine in 2024 and serves in the 2nd Corps of the National Guard of Ukraine “Khartiia”. Before his military service, Ruzavin was a journalist for the Russian television channel TV Rain and a reporter for the independent media outlet Mediazona, for which he covered Russia's invasion of Ukraine after 24 February 2022.

== Awards ==
- 2009 — Laureate of the Anatoliy Moskalenko Foundation for the Development of Journalism for achievements in journalism.
- 2013 — Silver medal in the competition of artistic reporting "Samovydets" (for the report "How the desert sounds where the water begins", a collection of emotional notes from Jordan, Egypt, Iran, Tunisia).
- 2017 — was selected for The New Europe 100, the fourth annual list of central and eastern Europe’s brightest citizens changing the region’s societies, politics, or business environments. The list was created by Res Publica, the Warsaw-based journal; Google; the Visegrad Fund; and the Financial Times.
- 2019 — in the list of 100 most influential women in Ukraine by Ukrainian weekly magazine Focus.
- 2020 — book The Lost Island: Tales From The Occupied Crimea by Nataliya Gumenyuk was included in the list of the best book of 2020 by PEN Ukraine—in the category "Travel essays/reports"; this book also won a special prize within the Best Book Award 2020 by the Book Forum Lviv.
- 2021 — a documentary The Murder of Gongadze: 20 Years of Searching for the Truth—by Natalia Gumenyuk, Maxim Kamenev and Anna Tsyhyma—won "Best Publicistics" award within "Honor of the profession" prize.
- 2022 — Nataliya Gumenyuk is awarded a Free Media Award for "her truth-seeking reports on the horrors of war from a variety of locations such as Kharkiv, Bucha and Mykolajiv in Ukraine".
- In June 2022, as the head of the Public Interest Journalism Lab, Gumenyuk received the 2022 NED Democracy Award.
- 2023 — Nataliya Gumenyuk was awarded the special Hanns Joachim Friedrichs Award.
- 2024 — Gumenyuk received the Press Freedom Award from Reporters Without Borders in the Impact category for her contribution to defending freedom of speech and documenting war crimes through The Reckoning Project.
- March 2026 — Gumenyuk was included among the laureates of the “UP100: Power of Women” award, established by Ukrainska Pravda, in the Society category.
- June 2026 — Nataliya Gumenyuk was awarded the third class of the Order of Merit, a state decoration for service to the country.

== Selected works ==
=== Books ===
- Veni, Vidi, Scripsi: Світ у масштабі українського репортажу (Veni, Vidi, Scripsi: The World on the Scale of Ukrainian Reporting) (collection of reports by various authors), Kyiv: Tempora, 2013.
- Майдан Тахрір. У пошуках втраченої революції (Tahrir Square. In search of the lost revolution.), Kyiv: Political Criticism, 2015.
- Загублений острів. Книга репортажів з окупованого Криму (Lost island. Book of reports from the occupied Crimea.), Lviv: Old Lion Publishing House, 2020.

=== Journalism and opinion ===
- "I've Watched America and Ukraine Switch Places". The Atlantic. 9 November 2024.
- "When Will This War End? The Question Is Meaningless". The New York Times. 15 February 2026.
- "As a Ukrainian journalist, I've covered the US for 20 years. I find it increasingly shocking". The Guardian. 30 April 2026.
