= Major Grom: Plague Doctor =

2021 Russian superhero film

- English-language theatrical release poster
- Directed by: Oleg Trofim
- Written by: Artyom Gabrelyanov; Roman Kotkov; Evgeniy Eronin; Vladimir Besedin; Aleksandr Kim; Valentina Tronova; Nikolay Titov
- Based on: Major Grom by: Artyom Gabrelyanov; Evgeny Fedotov
- Produced by: Artyom Gabrelyanov; Michael Kitaev; Olga Filipuk; Roman Kotkov; Evgeniy Eronin
- Starring: Tikhon Zhiznevsky; Lyubov Aksyonova; Aleksei Maklakov; Aleksandr Seteykin; Sergei Goroshko; Dmitry Chebotaryov; Mikhail Evlanov; Oleg Chugunov
- Cinematography: Maxim Zhukov
- Edited by: Yuriy Karikh; Aleksandr Puzyryov
- Music by: Roman Seliverstov
- Production companies: Bubble Studios; KinoPoisk HD
- Distributed by: Walt Disney Studios; Netflix (International)
- Release date: April 1, 2021 (Russia)
- Running time: 137 minutes
- Country: Russia
- Languages: Russian; English
- Budget: ₽640 million
- Box office: ₽317 million; $4.4 million (worldwide)

Major Grom: Plague Doctor (Russian: Майор Гром: Чумной Доктор, romanized: Mayor Grom: Chumnoy Doktor) is a 2021 Russian superhero film directed by Oleg Trofim, based on the comic book series of the same name by the Russian publisher Bubble Comics, created by Artyom Gabrelyanov. It is the second film adapted from Bubble Comics, as well as the first feature-length film based on a Russian comic. Prior to that, the studio had released the short film Major Grom. It stars Tikhon Zhiznevsky in the lead role, alongside Lyubov Aksyonova, Aleksei Maklakov, Aleksandr Seteykin, Sergei Goroshko, and Dmitry Chebotaryov. The film is set in Saint Petersburg and tells the story of police major Igor Grom, an honest and skilled cop with unconventional methods, who pursues a vigilante murderer in the mask of a plague doctor.

A teaser for the film was first screened on 30 September 2017 at IgroMir / Comic-Con Russia 2017, after which the project faced difficulties in production for some time, with the team being disbanded and reassembled, and the concept of the film redone from scratch. Three years later, a full trailer was shown at Comic Con Russia 2020, with a tentative release date. Major Grom: Plague Doctor premiered on 25 March 2021 in St. Petersburg. The online premiere took place on 5 May 2021 on KinoPoisk HD and Netflix.

Major Grom: Plague Doctor received a moderately positive reception from critics: the overall quality of the work was noted, but the clichéd and unoriginal plot was also criticised. Some observers have claimed that the film denounces the Russian opposition and praises the police, but not all reviewers agreed with this opinion; the authors themselves have denied these allegations in several interviews. The film failed at the box office, collecting only 328 million rubles in the CIS, with a budget of 640 million rubles, but it proved popular on Netflix and Kinopoisk HD.

== Plot ==
Saint Petersburg police major Igor Grom is chasing three bank robbers dressed in red sports suits and disguised as villainous hockey players from the popular Soviet cartoon Puck! Puck! He catches them, while causing significant property damage, and gets reprimanded by his superior, Colonel General Fedor Prokopenko.

Soon after, the trial of "rich boy" Kirill Grechkin begins; he is accused of fatally hitting a girl with his car. Despite the evidence against him, Grechkin is acquitted and the brother of the deceased, Lyosha Makarov, suspects the court of corruption. IT millionaire Sergei Razumovsky, founder of the social network Vmeste, and his friend Oleg Volkov, who grew up in the same orphanage as the deceased girl, are also outraged by the court's decision. At the same time, videos of the Plague Doctor appear on the internet—an avenger in a mask and a combat suit, armed with bombs and flamethrowers, who promises to "cleanse" the city of scoundrels. The Doctor burns Kirill Grechkin to death in his car. After the murder, Oleg comes to Razumovsky and confesses that he was the Doctor. Razumovsky is upset by this, but hesitates to turn his friend in to the authorities.

Grom, who witnessed the murder, is trying to investigate it and find the Doctor, who is now considered by many to be a hero. FSB officer Evgeny Strelkov, who arrives from Moscow to capture the Doctor, removes the major from the case. Instead, Grom and his new trainee, Dima Dubin, are sent to deal with the theft of twelve refrigerators. However, contrary to their official assignment, the two continue to investigate the Doctor's case, having received a tip from Grom's informant and unsuccessfully trying to knock information out of people associated with the criminal underworld. In the meantime, Grom saves a young woman from thugs, but she turns out to be journalist and blogger Yulia Pchyolkina, who staged the attack in order to get close to Grom and obtain information about the Plague Doctor case for her blog.

Meanwhile, the Doctor accumulates new victims: the head of a bank that defrauded depositors and the owner of a polluting landfill, along with the latter's entire family. Dubin speculates that the Doctor's next appearance will be at the opening of a casino, where the crème de la crème of St. Petersburg society will gather. Grom infiltrates the opening party, where he meets Pchyolkina and Razumovsky. Instead of the real Doctor, however, only his followers appear, wanting to rob the rich. Sergei Razumovsky tries to prevent the violence and dissuade them with money, but a fight ensues, in which Grom and a number of FSB officers capture the bandits. Grom is subsequently forced to resign from the police by Strelkov.

Despite his dismissal, he continues his investigation and learns about Razumovsky's childhood in the orphanage, and that he used to draw birds that looked like the Doctor's mask. Back at the casino, Pchyolkina had told Grom about Razumovsky's contract with Holt International, a company engaged in high-tech weapons development. It was Holt International that created the Plague Doctor's costume and equipment. Grom directly accuses Razumovsky of being the Plague Doctor. By this point, Sergei has realized that the accusation is true: "Oleg" was his secondary personality (Grom points out that according to official documents, the real Oleg Volkov died in the war in Syria a year before). His dark side takes over; he knocks Grom out with a blow to the head, puts the Doctor's suit on him, and tosses him near the site of his next murder. The police grab Grom, and Strelkov now believes that Igor is the Doctor.

Dubin and Pchyolkina help Grom escape from custody, and he goes on the hunt for the Doctor. Meanwhile, the vigilante publishes a new video: he calls on all his followers to fill the streets and lynch anyone they consider to be a villain. Spontaneous pogroms begin in the city. Razumovsky confesses to Igor that in this way, he wants to get rid of not only corrupt officials and rich people, but also his followers, whom he considers to be immoral imitators and misfits; in his opinion, the state will be forced to send troops and kill them, and Razumovsky will subsequently be able to create a "new Petersburg". A fight breaks out between Grom and Razumovsky, in which the Doctor almost wins, but Dubin and Pchyolkina come to Grom's rescue. Razumovsky is neutralized, and Pchyolkina reveals that she recorded his boasting speech, including his nefarious plans. Grom declares to the Doctor that he also sees problems in the country, but considers it unacceptable to solve them by means of murder.

Meanwhile, the pogroms quickly subside when a gang led by one of Grom's informants acts against the rioters. Lyosha Makarov, who participated in them, is planning to kill the corrupt judge who released Grechkin. When his grandchildren visit him, however, Lyosha realizes that he is incapable of committing the murder, and spares him. FSB officer Strelkov claims all credit for the apprehension of the Plague Doctor, while Grom is content to spend time with his new friends, Dubin and Pchyolkina.

In a mid-credits scene, Razumovsky is shown in a mental institution. His "dark side" speaks to him, telling him that "they" will soon be free. In a post-credits scene, Oleg Volkov is shown in a militant camp in Syria: it turns out that he is still alive, and he watches his friend Razumovsky's capture on television.

== Cast ==
- Tikhon Zhiznevsky as Major Igor Grom, a police detective with the Saint Petersburg Police
- Lyubov Aksyonova as Yulia Pchyolkina, a blogger and journalist
- Aleksei Maklakov as Colonel General Fedor Prokopenko, Igor Grom's boss, head of the Saint Petersburg Police
- Aleksandr Seteykin as Dmitry "Dima" Dubin, a trainee at the Police of Russia, Igor Grom's partner
- Sergei Goroshko as Sergei Razumovsky / the Plague Doctor, a billionaire philanthropist, founder of the Vmeste social network
- Dmitry Chebotaryov as Oleg Volkov, childhood friend and bodyguard of Razumovsky
- Mikhail Evlanov as Evgeny Strelkov, a Federal Security Service officer assigned from Moscow to investigate the Plague Doctor case
- Kyivstoner (Albert Vasiliev) as Booster Ignat, Grom's informant and leader of the gang of football fans
- Oleg Chugunov as Aleksei "Lyosha" Makarov, a boy from an orphanage
- Anton Bogdanov as "the Leader", one of the bank robbers
- Nikita Kologrivyy as "the Psycho", one of the bank robbers
- Oisel More Despaigne as "the Brute", one of the bank robbers
- Yuri Nasonov as Kirill Grechkin, the son of a billionaire
- Anna Nevskaya as Olga Isaeva, head of RosGarantBank
- Yuri Vaksman as Philipp Zilchenko, owner of the landfill
- Vitaly Khaev as Albert Bekhtiev, entrepreneur, owner of the Golden Dragon casino
- Yulia Pashruta as Anna Terebkina, a news presenter
- Anastasiya Nemolyaeva as Elena Prokopenko, Colonel General Fedor Prokopenko's wife
- Igor Ivanov as Judge Sergey Bengalsky
- Konstantin Khabensky as Dr. Veniamin Rubinstein, psychiatrist (in mid-credits scene)
- Alexandra Cherkasova-Sluzhitel as Sofa, Dr. Rubinstein's assistant (in mid-credits scene)
- Vitaly Milonov (cameo appearance) as himself

=== Casting ===
The filmmakers tried to use less famous actors as they were dissatisfied with the same few actors playing in many different films. Bubble had difficulties with the casting—in particular, with the selection of a lead actor to portray Igor Grom. Alexander Gorbatov, who played Grom in the short film, did not return to the role due to lack of interest in the project. The search for a new actor took a whole year. According to screenwriter and producer Roman Kotkov, "...we could not even imagine that it was so difficult to find a tall handsome man with intelligence in his eyes in Russia". Eventually, Tikhon Zhiznevsky was selected for the role. Zhiznevsky had to lose ten kilograms for the part, as well as undergo serious physical training in order to look more athletic. For this, he worked with coaches in Moscow and St. Petersburg. Dmitry Chebotaryov, another actor who took part in the film and who had known Zhiznevsky for a long time, recalls that he and many of Zhiznevsky's other acquaintances would never have thought that their friend would fit the part he was about to play, as he was mainly known for playing romantic roles.

For the role of Sergei Razumovsky, theatre actor Sergei Goroshko was chosen. In order to convincingly play the character, Goroshko compiled a complete biography of the character, from his birth until the events after the film, partly sourcing this from the comics as well as from the film's scriptwriters. Goroshko also had to lose weight for the role, in his case fifteen kilograms. The voice of the Plague Doctor in the mask is an overlap of the voices of Goroshko and Dmitry Chebotaryov.

Actor Dmitry Chebotaryov auditioned for both the roles of Igor Grom and Oleg, and, according to the producers, both auditions were successful, but he was eventually selected to play Oleg Volkov. Chebotaryov was the only actor among the main cast who did not have to change his appearance in any way for filming. Ukrainian rapper Kyivstoner was approved for the role of Booster Ignat, Grom's informant, due to his flamboyant personality. Almost all of his lines were improvised.

Politician Vitaly Milonov was invited to appear in a cameo as himself, since the studio needed a character who would condemn the actions of the Plague Doctor on the in-film television. Director Oleg Trofim was opposed to Milonov becoming this character since he did not want the film to have unnecessary allusions to real life, but Gabrelyanov insisted, and Milonov appeared in a short scene in which he committed to a ban of the Plague Doctor masks.

== Production ==
=== Initial plans ===
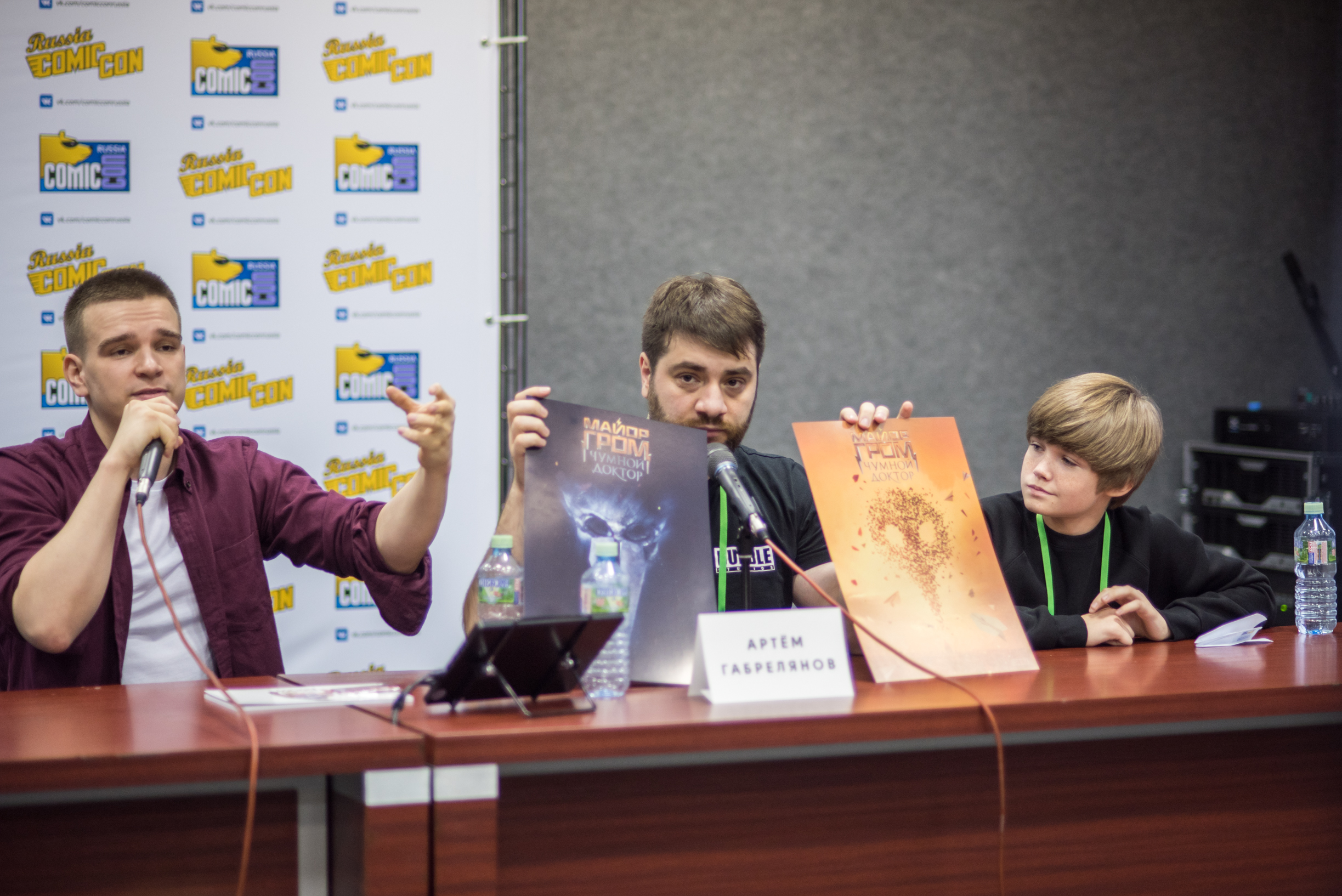
Vladimir Besedin, Artyom Gabrelyanov, and Oleg Chugunov during the film's presentation at IgroMir/Comic-Con 2017

Representatives of Bubble Studios repeatedly stated that the short film Major Grom would be a test project before filming a full-length movie, which, if successful, would be followed by adaptations of other Bubble comics. It was also stated that Bubble Studios plans to attract American actors to the project, film it in English, and launch it internationally, with a focus on Western markets. The full-length Major Grom was to be produced by the same team as the short one. The planned budget at that time was at least five million US dollars.

The filmmakers also said that the look of Saint Petersburg in the film would differ from the real one, and, in addition, the geography of the city would undergo changes. Bubble Studios director and Major Grom screenwriter, Artyom Gabrelyanov, commented, "There are certain things that make the character look organic. If you take a camera and just shoot what is outside the window, then any superhero in a Russian context will look funny". The filmmakers planned to stick to a 12+ rating, although they did not deny that scenes of violence could increase the rating to 16+. According to Gabrelyanov, the studio did not set itself the goal of giving "a [Russian] answer" to Hollywood, and that it is more important for it to prove its merits by deeds, not by words. In November 2017, Bubble Studios announced an open casting for the film. Vladimir Besedin, who was the director at the time, mentioned that there would be several after-credits scenes related to the story.

=== Teaser ===
External videos
- Major Grom: Paper Airplanes on YouTube

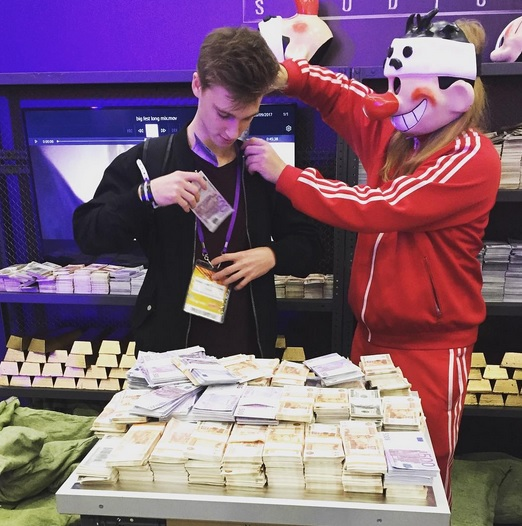
Photo from the presentation of the film at IgroMir / Comic-Con Russia 2017, depicting one of the bank robbers dressed as a hockey player

A teaser for the film was first shown on 30 September 2017 at IgroMir / Comic-Con Russia 2017. The clip shows a young restless skateboarder, played by Oleg Chugunov, who watches a video of the Plague Doctor and begins to believe in his ideas, before joining a flash mob in which everyone who wants to protest against government corruption must release a paper airplane from a window. Igor Grom himself appears in the video only from the back, in passing, at a shawarma kiosk. The scenery of Saint Petersburg is made to look like New York City, and the actors speak English; the audio was later dubbed into Russian.

Responses to the teaser included accusations by Alexander Strepetilov, editor of Mir Fantastiki magazine, that the Plague Doctor was a satire on popular Russian opposition politician Alexei Navalny (while in the comics he was an allusion to Pavel Durov, a creator of the Russian social network VKontakte). Popular video blogger and film reviewer Evgeny Bazhenov, known as BadComedian, to the contrary, stated that any parallels in the film with existing reality were the right move on the studio's part: "In their first film, I did not relate myself to anyone. Here at least it is clear that this is a modern world, modern people".

=== First team and changeover ===
According to the filmmakers, the short film was well received by Western audiences, and therefore the teaser was filmed in English. Artyom Gabrelyanov stated that Hollywood producers were very interested in the project. One of these was Harvey Weinstein, but the meeting with him was cancelled at the very last moment due to allegations of sexual harassment against him. Foreign producers insisted on the participation of English-speaking actors and an Americanization of the film, so as to better cater to English-speaking audiences. Examples of this included changing Saint Petersburg to New York City and renaming Igor Grom to Harry Thunder. However, Bubble felt that this contradicted their concept for the project. As a result, they decided to refuse the help of foreign producers and shoot the film primarily for a Russian-speaking audience. Subsequently, the first teaser, as well as the original 2017 short film, were deemed non-canonical to the events of Major Grom: Plague Doctor.

During development, the production team had creative disagreements that prevented the work from continuing. The creative team wanted the film to be more story-driven, while the director of the short film, Vladimir Besedin, as well as the crew, wanted it to be more action-packed. This changed when Artyom Gabrelyanov met producer Mikhail Kitaev, who became interested in the film and at the same time had experience in grand-scale projects, such as Invasion, Sputnik, Chernobyl, and T-34. He helped make connections, select actors, and create scenery. Kitaev saw the Major Grom short film while on the set of the 2018 film Ice, together with Oleg Trofim, and both liked it. According to the plan, filming was supposed to begin a month and a half after Kitaev joined the project, but in fact, Bubble only had a script and concept art, and they were not ready for filming. Kitaev immediately noted the inexperience of the team and the lack of skillful management, and he felt that the script was decent but needed improvement.

The first weeks of working on the film were extremely difficult, as the team did not understand what to do. In the end, the project was frozen, all deadlines were cancelled, and Gabrelyanov and Kitaev turned to Artyom's father, Aram Gabrelyanov, founder of Life news agency, who had invested in the movie, for approval of a further work plan. A personnel reshuffle occurred, the new team worked for three weeks, but conflicts continued to arise, and the project was frozen again—this time for a week and a half, resulting in the entire team being disbanded. Vladimir Besedin, director of the short film, resigned, and Gabrelyanov, Kitaev, and Kotkov made a list of directors who could cope with the project, eventually selecting Oleg Trofim.

=== Script development ===
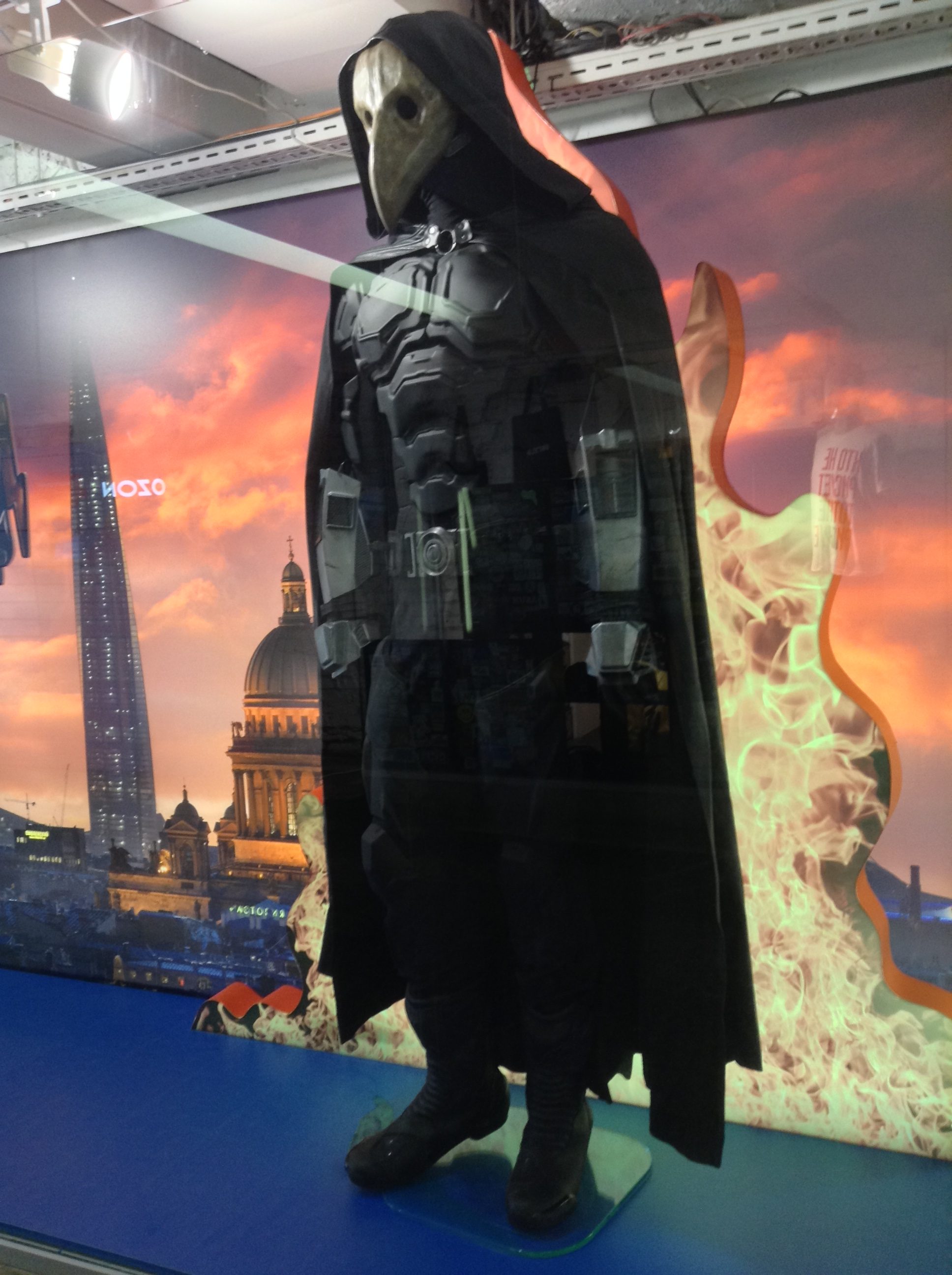
Plague Doctor's suit

The film's plot is based on the first story arc of the original comic series, which recounts the struggle of Major Grom with a serial killer hiding under the mask of a plague doctor. In the scenario itself, Bubble Studios planned to leave about 80% of the plot of the original story and add 20% of new content. After the teaser was released, the filmmakers received many unflattering comments related to its political content, both from Russian pro-government structures and from members of the public opposed to the government. As a result, it was decided to remove all the politics that were present in the original comic, leaving only the problem of "uncontrolled crimes of rich people who can get away from the law with their money" and focusing on social inequality instead. Gabrelyanov noted that the problem of inequality would also be more understandable to foreign viewers than allusions to Russian politics.

Initial drafts of the script had scenes with helicopters and skyscrapers, but when producer Maxim Kitaev joined the project, he advised the scriptwriters to remove them, as they would require too much money, due to their scale. The plot before the restart of production was too large, and it would have been impossible to film, even if the team had a budget 2–3 times bigger, so the writers had to shorten it. When asked why the plot of Major Grom is so unoriginal and clichéd, Oleg Trofim replied that comics adaptations hadn't previously been filmed in Russia, and local filmmakers needed to master the genre and its basics first. Only once this happened would it be possible to deconstruct the genre and create something more original.

During adaptation, the plot of the original comic underwent significant changes. For example, in the film, the character of Yulia Pchyolkina is not only the protagonist's love interest and damsel in distress, but also a full-fledged participant in the story line. Oleg Trofim commented: "It is not relevant anymore to show the heroine as a girl who does not want to decide anything, but wants a dress". In the film, the personality of Igor Grom also changed: in the comics, he is very noble and strictly follows a moral code, whereas in the film, he is more antiheroic and less scrupulous. The writers deliberately didn't show Grom's origin story, opting to only offer hints throughout the film. Roman Kotkov explained this by saying that superhero origin stories have become boring to audiences. The character of Razumovsky also underwent some changes, especially his motivation: in the film, the Plague Doctor sincerely, albeit using radical methods, wants to make the world a better place, whereas in the comics, he only uses justice as an excuse, while committing murders for his personal gain.

The film contains a number of references to other Bubble comics, which are considered to be a setup for a potential Bubble cinematic universe. There is mention of a "hitman with rat" in the film—the nickname of Demonslayer, one of the key characters in the Bubble comic universe and the protagonist of the comic series of the same name. Holt International, a corporation that designed the Plague Doctor's suit, appears in the Red Fury comic series as a main antagonist.

=== Filming locations and scenery ===
If Besedin wanted St. Petersburg to appear Americanized, Oleg Trofim made the city look closer to reality. Trofim lived in St. Petersburg for five years, and art director Dmitry Onishchenko is from there and knows the city well, and this helped when choosing locations. For over two months, Trofim and Onishchenko explored St. Petersburg to find streets that would best be suited for specific moments of the film. Oleg Trofim explained:

"We know classical Petersburg, which is full of Baroque architecture and Art Nouveau. This is the city in which there was a revolution, and Soviet architecture has strongly settled there. We are also familiar with the gangster Petersburg from the 1990s, with its endless networks of courtyards. We were faced with the task of determining which Petersburg to show. As a result, we completely abandoned the Soviet legacy and that of the 1990s and concentrated on the historical part, the one that is timeless, the one that creates the image of St. Petersburg as a majestic palace city".

In addition, the filmmakers decided to alter the layout of the city, as compared to the real St. Petersburg. To do this, they sketched a rough plan, marking the main locations in the film: the poor neighborhoods Grom visits, a police station, Razumovsky's office, and Grom's apartment. As a result, it turned out that Bolshaya Morskaya Street leads to Radishchev Street, Zhukov Street becomes Galernaya Street, and Nevsky Prospect does not seem to exist at all. Oleg Trofim complained that the logistics in St. Petersburg were inconvenient for filming, and that was why they had to create their own scenery.

Filming locations gallery

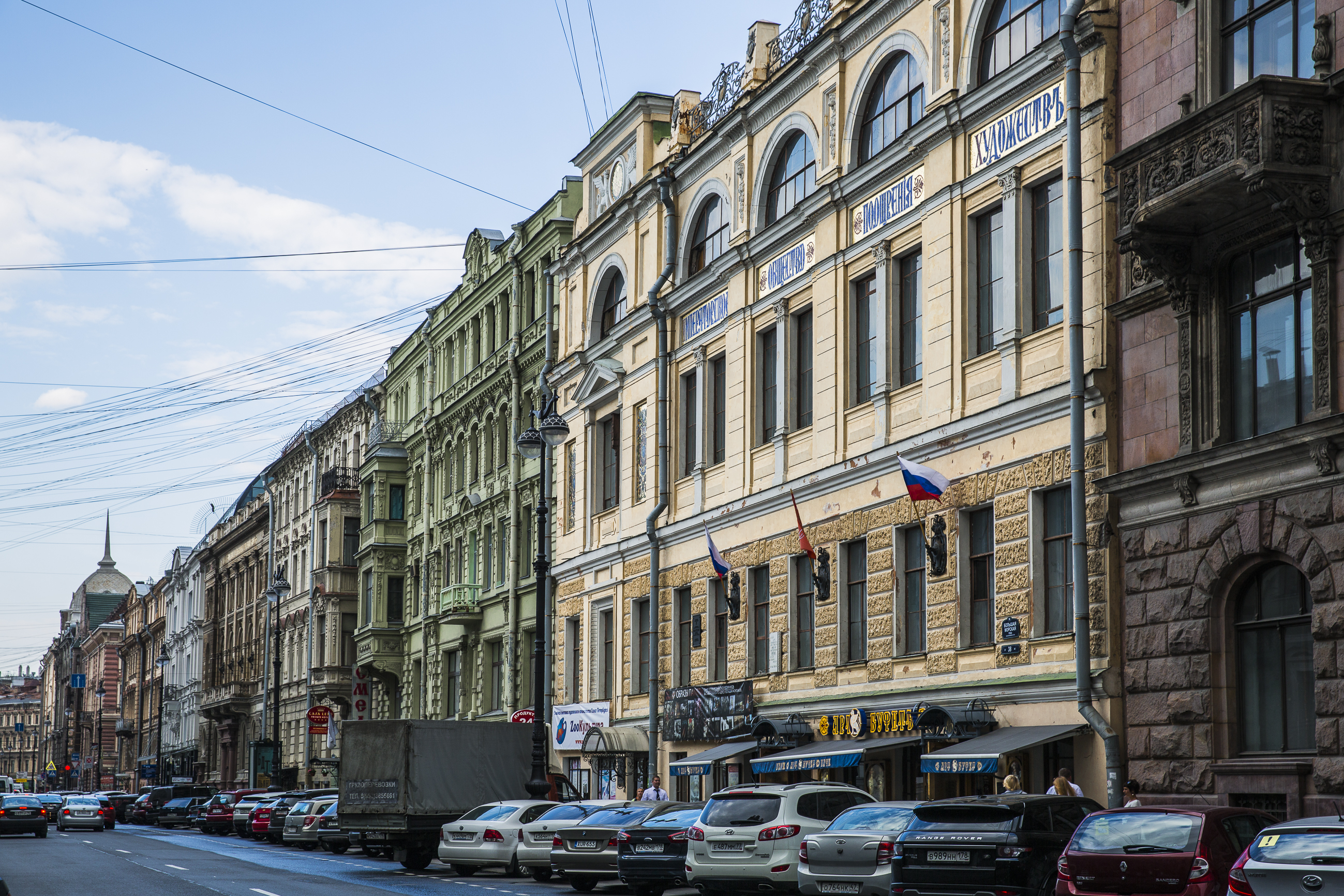
Bolshaya Morskaya Street, shown in the chase scene

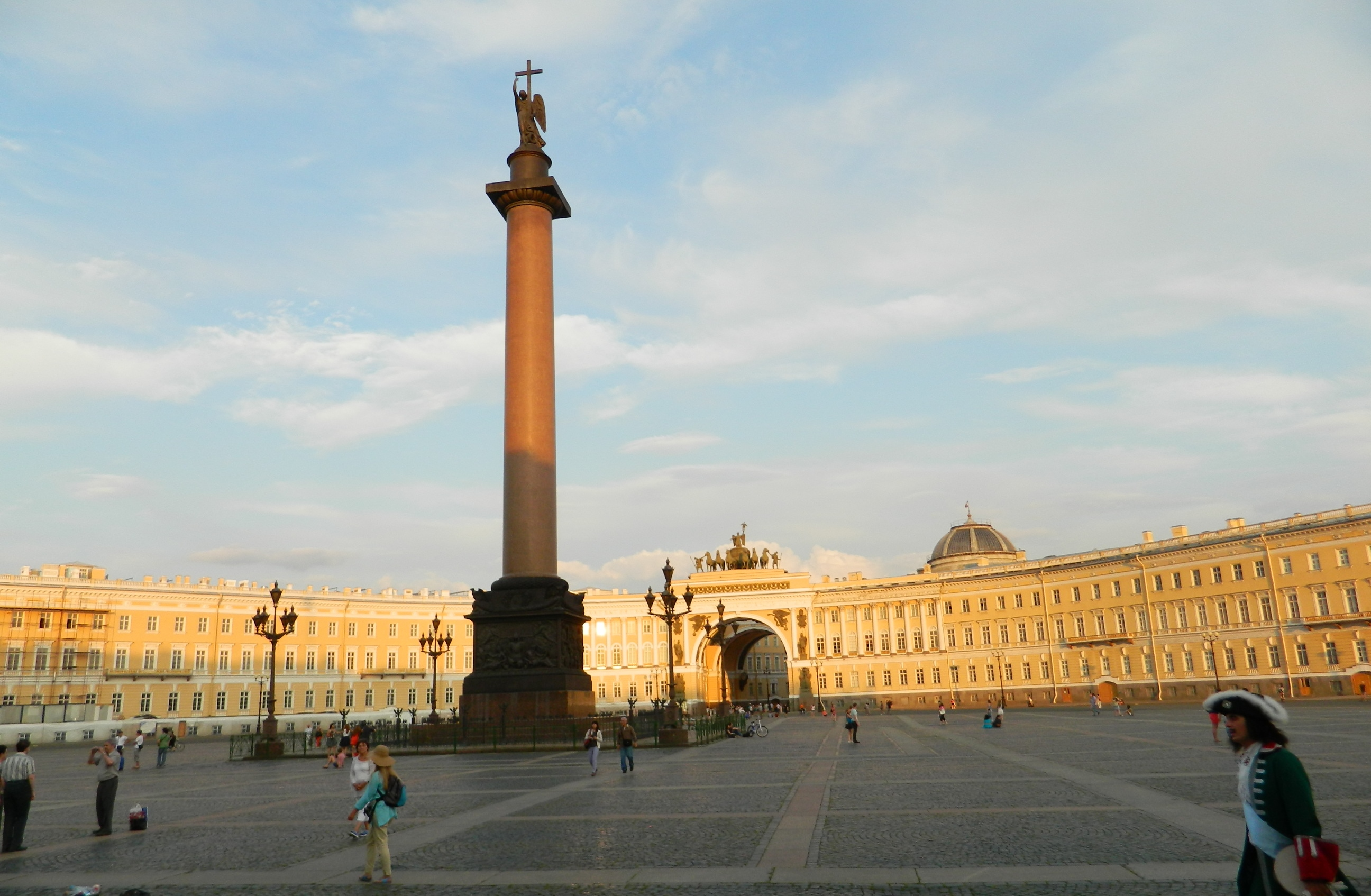
Palace Square

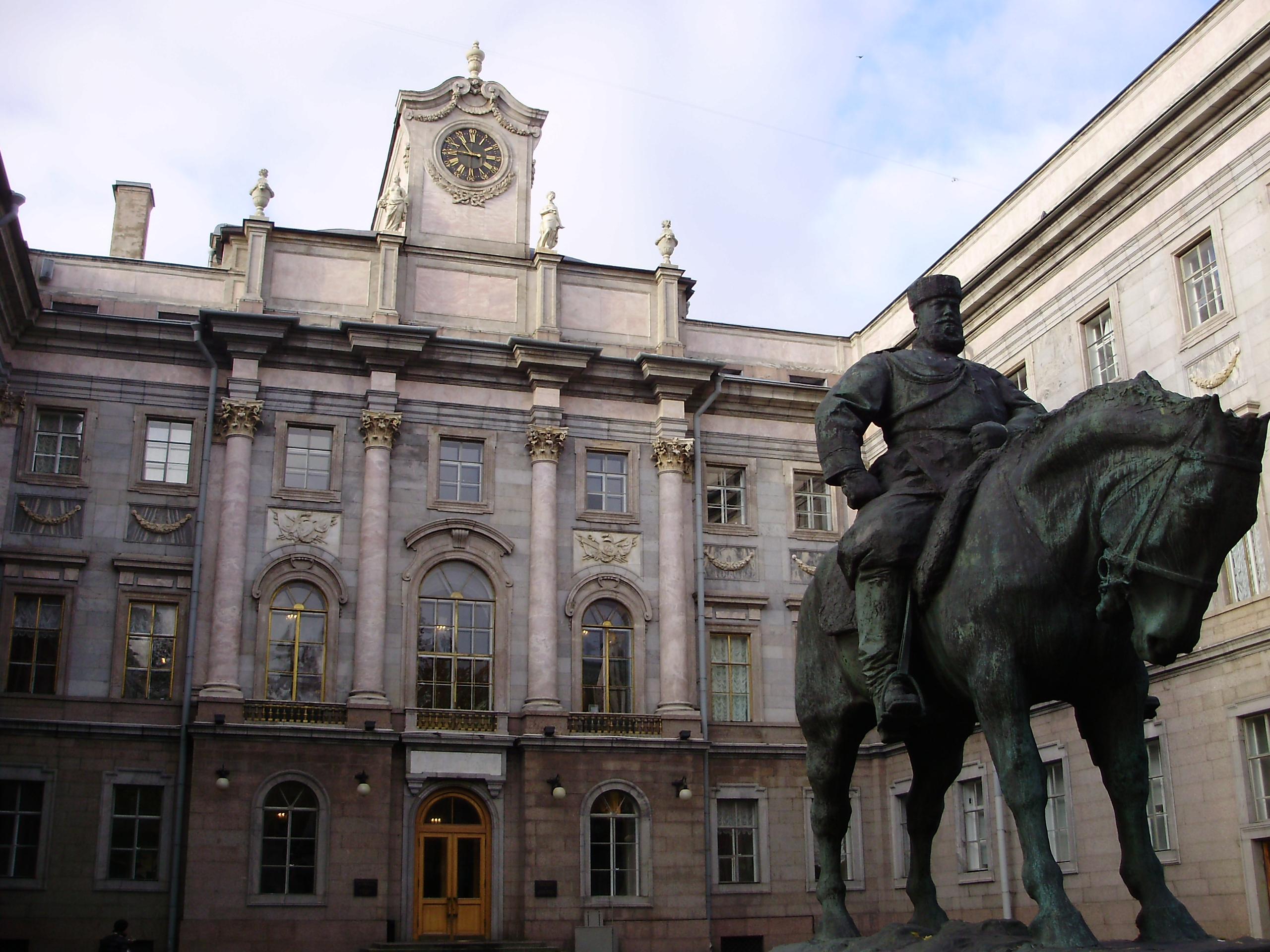
Marble Palace, which became the exterior of a police station

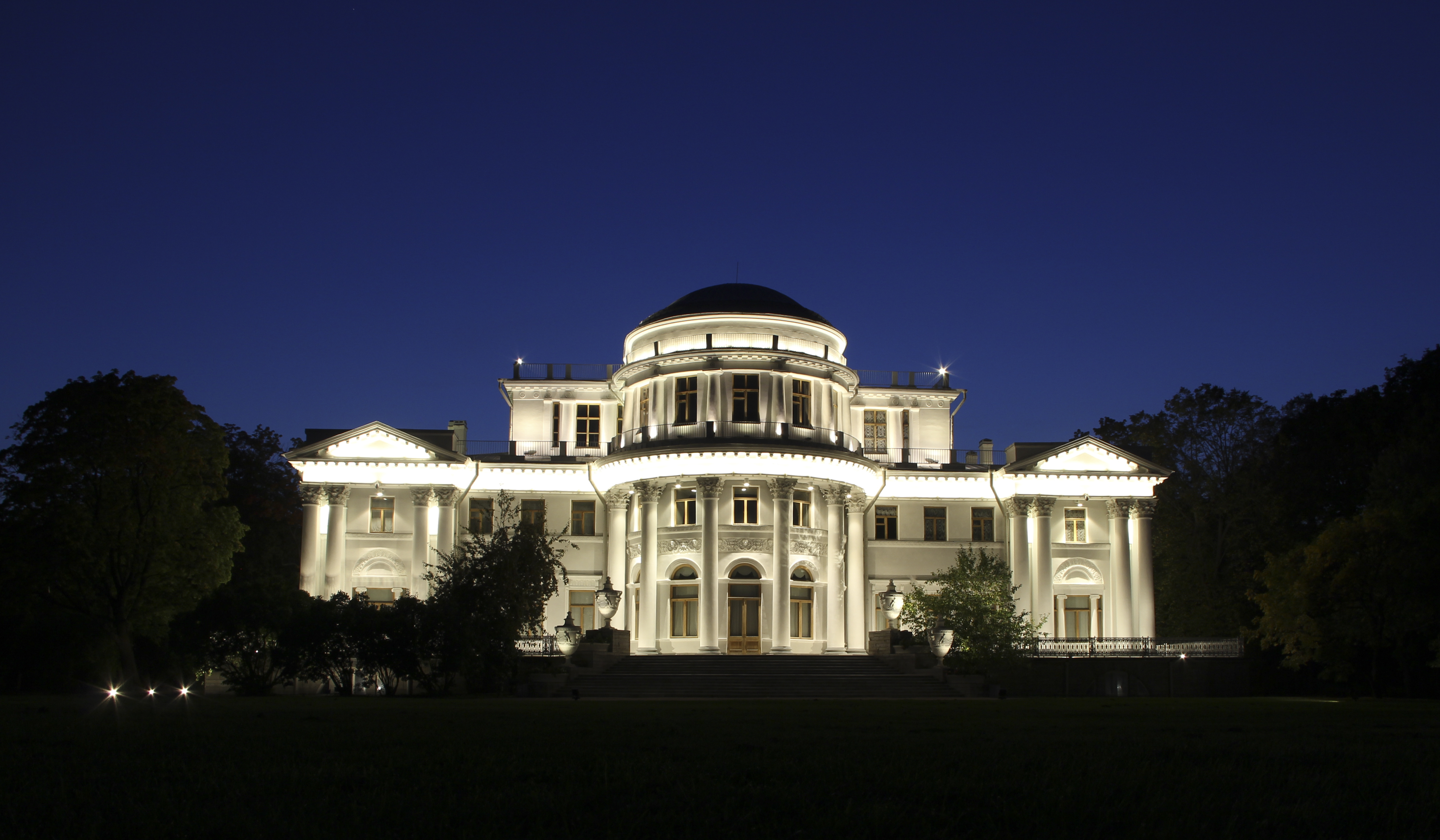
Yelagin Palace, which became the Grechkin mansion

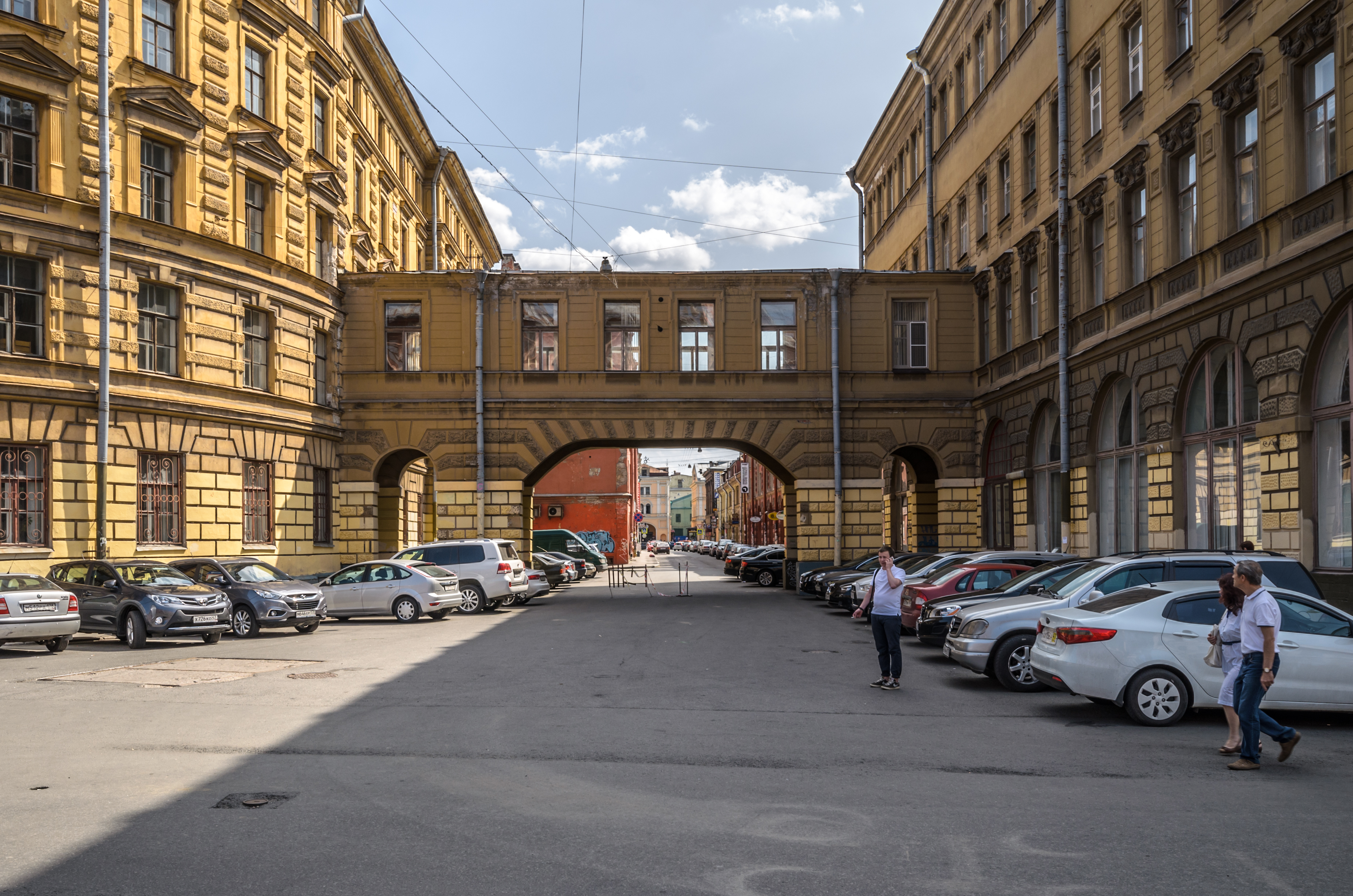
Bankovsky Lane, where Grom bought a shawarma from a stall

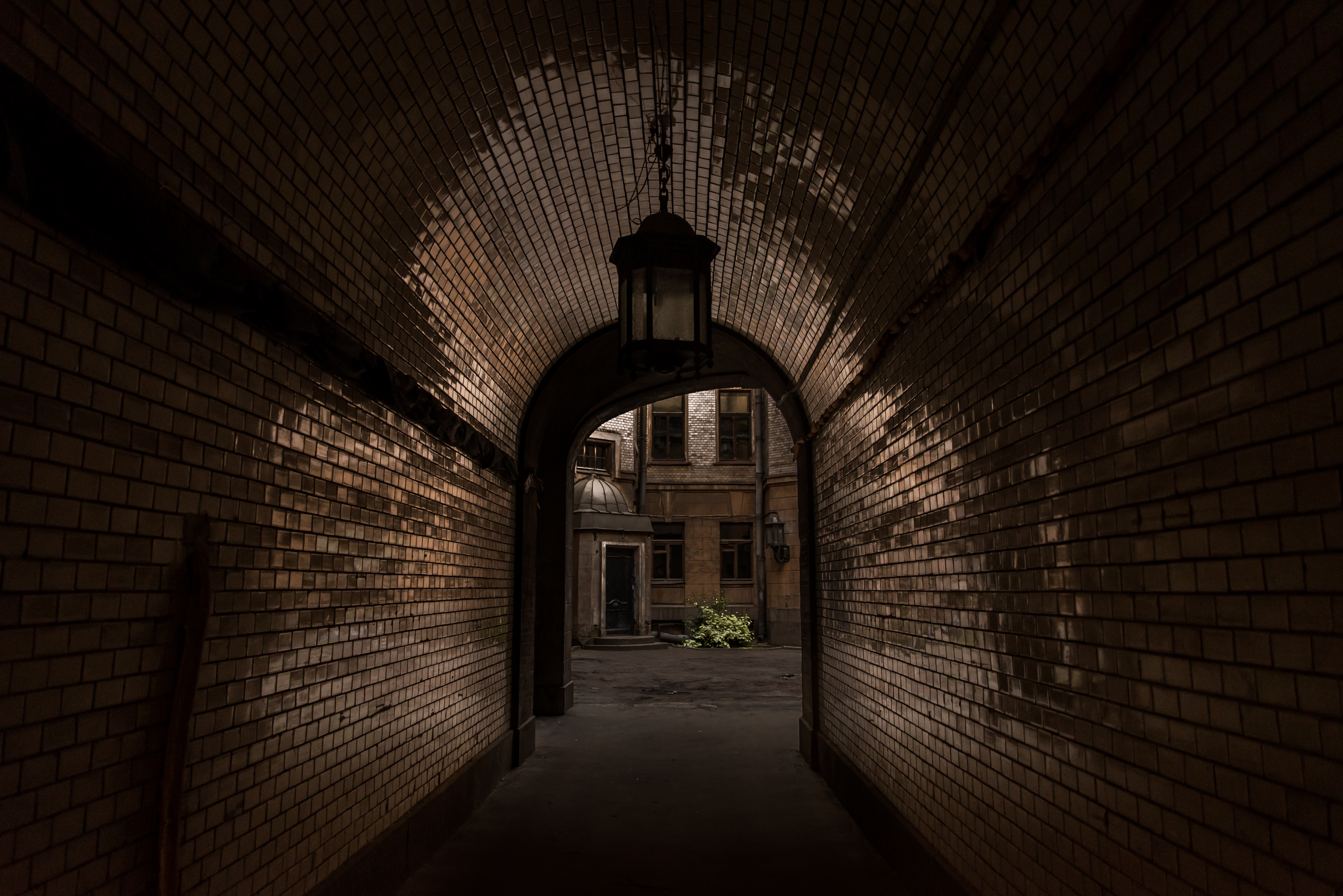
55 Galernaya Street. The gateway of the house where the "attack" on Pchyolkina took place

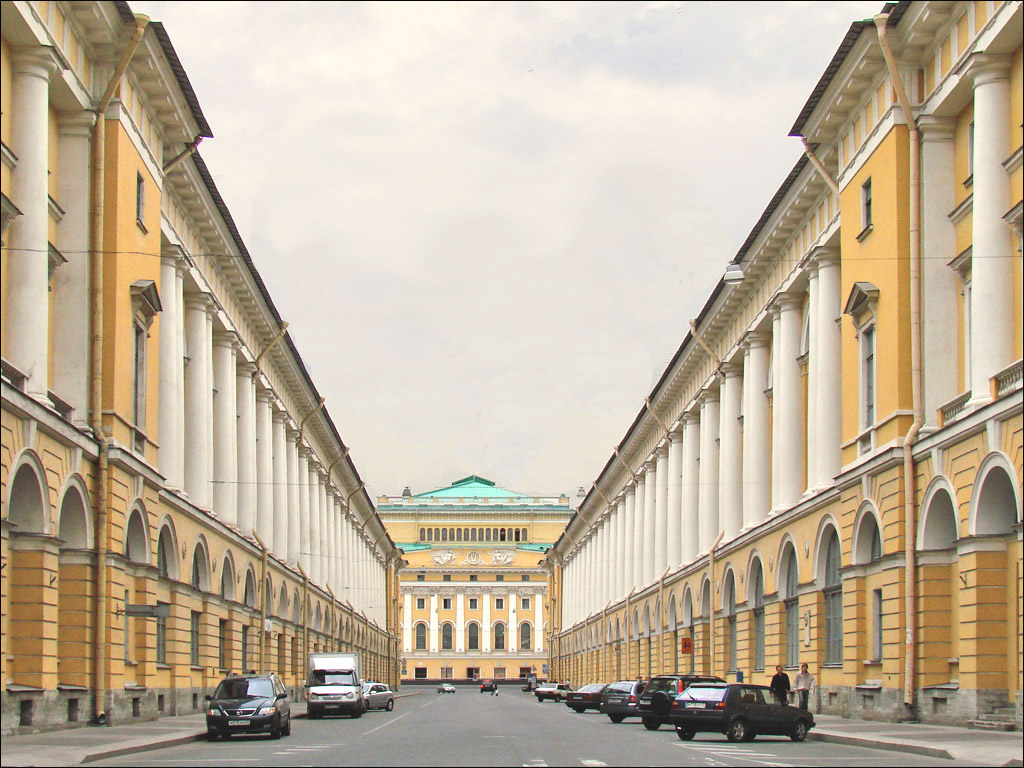
Zodchego Rossi Street, scene of the pogroms

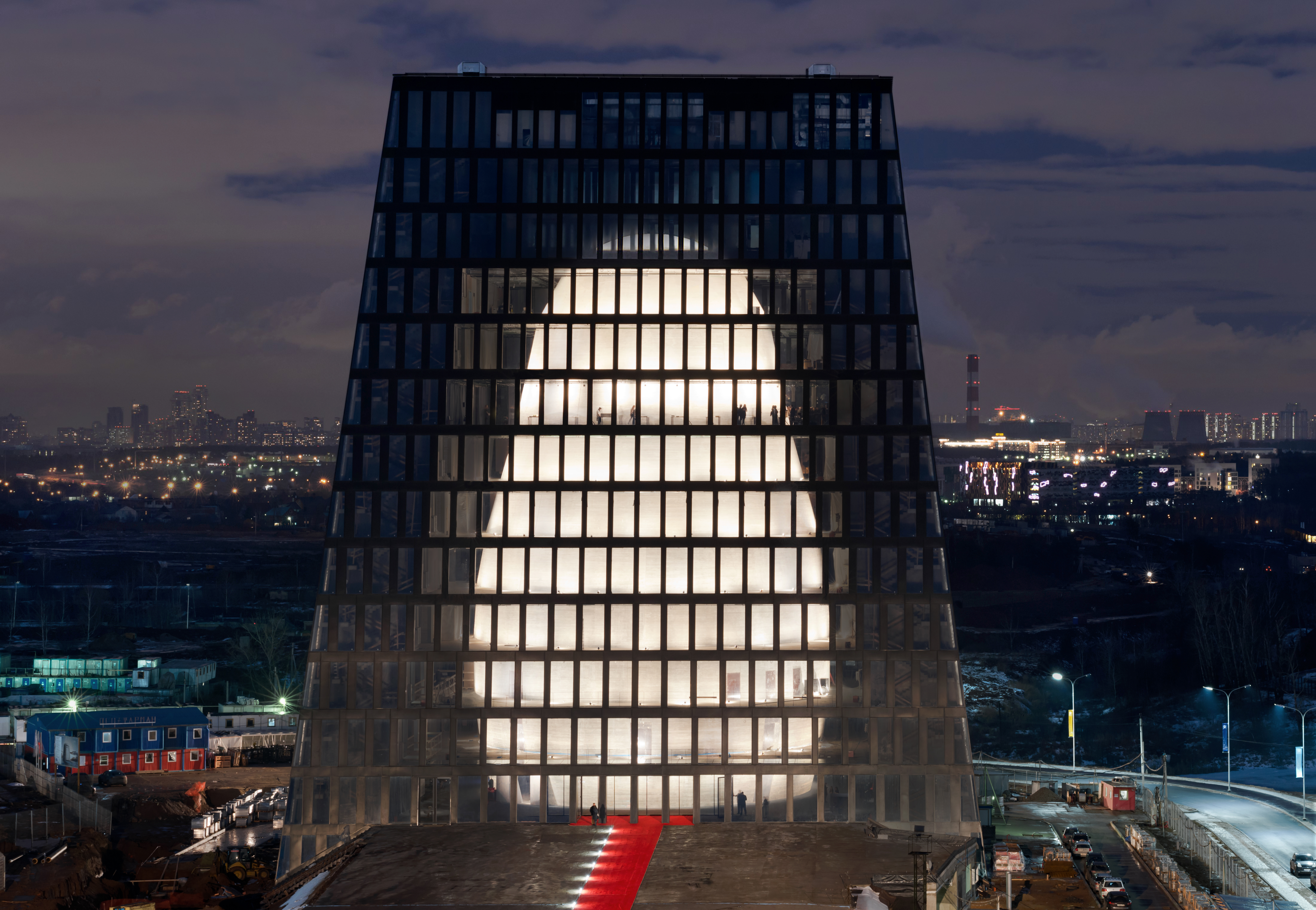
The Matrex building in Skolkovo, Moscow was the prototype for the Razumovsky skyscraper

=== Production restart ===
After the initial publicity in 2017, there was no new information about the film for two years. On 5 October 2019, continuation of work on the project was announced at IgroMir / Comic-Con Russia. It was announced that the director had been replaced, and instead of Vladimir Besedin, Oleg Trofim was at the helm of the production. The role of Major Grom also changed from Aleksander Gorbatov (ru) to Tikhon Zhiznevsky (ru). Additionally, significant changes had been made to the script.

Filming resumed in Saint Petersburg and the film was initially planned to go on screen in 2019. However, in October of that year, it was announced that it would not be released on the due date. Filming was completed in December 2019. The official first trailer was released on 27 May 2020, a day after Saint Petersburg's anniversary celebrations.

== Music ==
The music for the film was written by composer Roman Seliverstov. The film features symphonic music themes written by Seliverstov specifically for the production, as well as additional licensed songs. The symphonic portion of the soundtrack was recorded by the London Symphony Orchestra at Abbey Road Studios, in the United Kingdom. Seliverstov insisted that the music be recorded in this particular studio, since, in his opinion, audiences were accustomed to the sound of Hollywood films, and something similar had to be achieved in Major Grom. For the Plague Doctor's theme song, a special musical instrument was created, the "space cello", which resembles a cello but has only two strings, attached to sound boxes by long steel springs. This musical instrument produces an aggressive, metallic sound, which, according to the composer's plan, should emphasize the fearsome character of the antagonist.

External videos
- Opening credits, with "Peremen!" song on YouTube

The creators decided to use only Russian-language songs for the soundtrack. Oleg Trofim tried to use songs that were "not yet spoiled by their popularity", to help audiences discover new music. During the opening credits of the film, a cover of the song "Peremen!" plays, performed by 15-year-old Taisia Ashmarova. The song heard during the end credits, "Poezd v ogne", is performed by Levan Gorozia.

List of tracks used in Major Grom: Plague Doctor, published by Yandex Music:

Major Grom: Plague Doctor
No.	Title	Writer(s)	Length
1.	"Poezd v ogne"	Levan Gorozia	2:53
2.	"Idu iskat'"	Dolphin	4:09
3.	"Impichment"	Magicool	3:46
4.	"Poezd v ogne"	Super Collection Orchestra	3:36
5.	"Ya lyublyu lyudei"	Dolphin	3:33
6.	"V nashem dome"	Antoha MC	5:00
7.	"Silnee (OST Major Grom: Plague Doctor)"	Super Collection Orchestra	2:26
8.	"Kusok zhizni"	Aquarium	4:38
9.	"Ya shagayu po Moskve"	Andrey Petrov	2:09
10.	"Plyonku peremotay"	Kasseta	2:13
11.	"Ya znayu, kto ty (OST Major Grom: Plague Doctor)"	Super Collection Orchestra	4:19
12.	"Ulybka"	Vladimir Shainsky	2:05

== Theatrical release ==
At the 2020 Comic-Con Russia on 4 October, an official trailer was presented and it was announced that the film would be released in April 2021.

Major Grom: Plague Doctor had a special screening on 26 March at the Aurora cinema in St. Petersburg. Its world premiere took place on 29 March at the Karo 11 October cinema centre in Moscow.

== Reception ==
Major Grom: Plague Doctor received mixed to positive reviews from Russian critics with review aggregator Kritikanstvo rating it 6,4/10 based on 39 reviews, while KinoPoisk reported a 71% critical approval rating based on 34 reviews. The movie was praised by Kanobu, Mir Fantastiki, Igromania, Rossiyskaya Gazeta, TASS, TJournal, DTF.ru, Elle Girl, and RBK Daily. Others, like Afisha, Film.ru, and TimeOut Russia published mixed reviews, while Nezavisimaya Gazeta, Kino Mail.ru, InterMedia, and Meduza were critical of the movie, and Kommersant published two conflicting reviews.

Many critics praised the film for impressive visuals and the portrayal of a fictionalized version of Saint Petersburg, with an emphasis on the city's atmosphere. The acting, especially by Zhiznevsky and Aksyonova, was also met positively. However, many authors were uncomfortable with the movie's underlying message, which some believed to be anti-liberal and pro-police.

In 2021, the film won the Golden Trailer Award in the category "Best Foreign Action Trailer".

== Cultural influence, popularity, and box office ==
After Roskomnadzor, Russia's media oversight agency, blocked the Telegram messaging service nationwide in 2018, Pavel Durov organized a flash mob, urging protesters to release paper airplanes on the streets on 22 April 2018 at 19:00. A very similar flash mob, including a mass release of paper airplanes, was organized in the first Major Grom teaser by the Plague Doctor, whose character in the comic is loosely based on Durov.

Before the premiere, the website Byulleten Kinoprokatchika predicted that first-weekend box office receipts would amount to 200 million rubles. However, the film received half the box office and earned only 105 million in the first weekend. In the second weekend, about 66 million rubles were collected, and the total amount reached, taking into account the day of the premiere, rose to 222 million. The media suggested that the film could hardly recoup the announced budget of 640 million rubles by the end of its run. As a result, box office receipts amounted to only 317 million rubles in Russia and about 11 million in the CIS.

To support Major Grom by word of mouth, Bubble comics fans organized a series of flash mobs on social media to draw attention to the film. Some fans bought up all the seats in cinemas to increase ticket sales, and an unknown person even rented a billboard on New Arbat Avenue, in the center of Moscow, where Major Grom fan tweets were shown.

Nevertheless, despite low box office returns, the film gained popularity on streaming services: in May, it topped views on Kinopoisk HD, second only to Zack Snyder's Justice League. On Netflix, the film reached the top in a day, an extremely rare outcome for Russian cinema on this platform. By 8 July, the film entered the top ten on Netflix in 64 countries around the world, and took first place in fourteen countries. In the United States, the film reached second place on the Netflix movie charts, holding that position for five consecutive days in early July 2021.

== Related films ==
After the film's international success, a series of related productions followed, starting with Grom: Boyhood (2023), serving as the prequel to Major Grom: Plague Doctor. A sequel, Major Grom: The Game, was premiered on 23 May 2024.
