= Public Interest Journalism Lab =

Ukrainian experimental laboratory

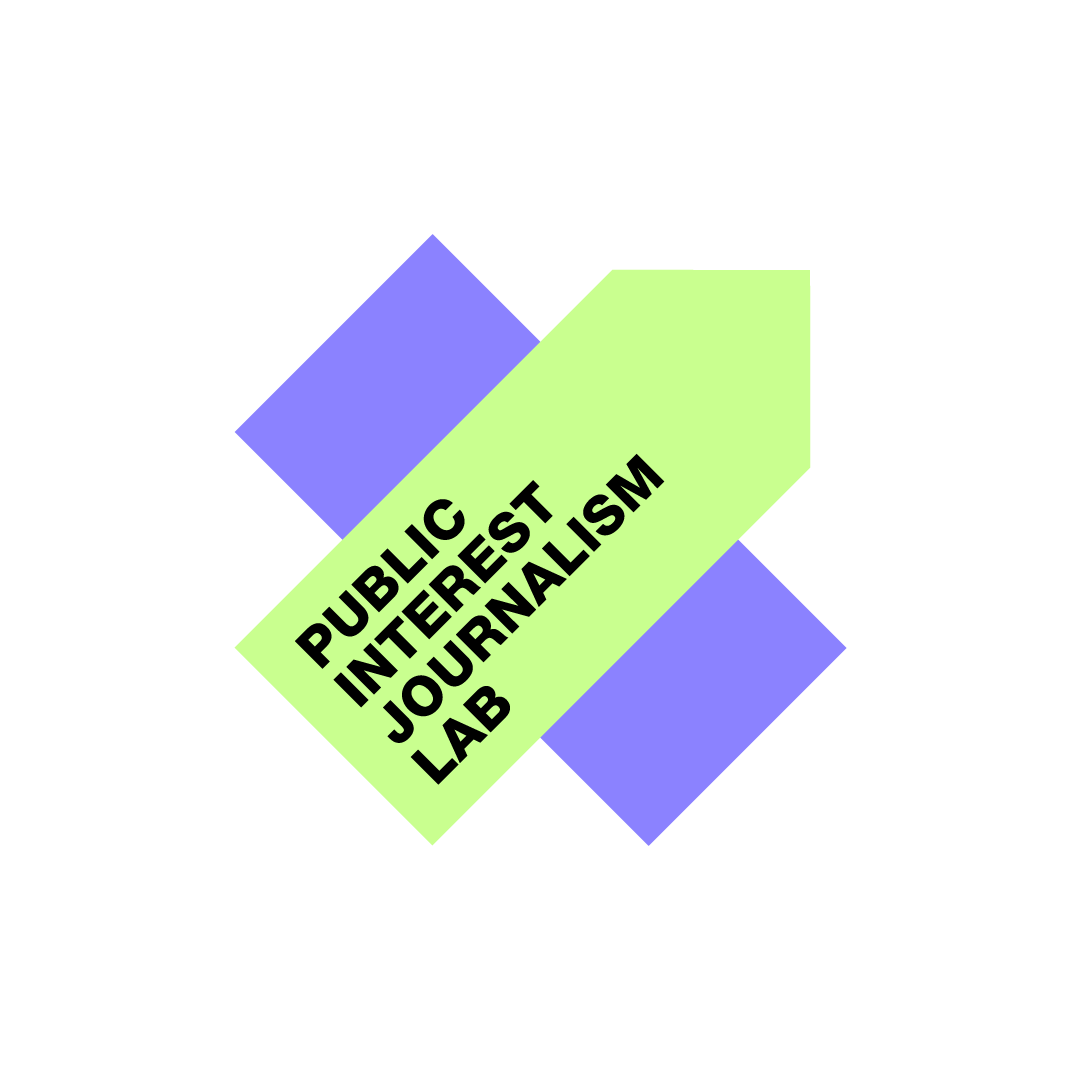
- Formation: 2020
- Type: NGO
- Location: Ukraine
- Founder and CEO: Nataliya Gumenyuk

Public Interest Journalism Lab (PIJL; Ukrainian: Лабораторія журналістики суспільного інтересу, romanized: Laboratoriya zhurnalistyky suspil'noho interesu) is an experimental laboratory that brings together journalists, sociologists and researchers from different countries who seek to achieve a constructive discussion on complex social issues. It was founded in 2020 by Ukrainian journalists and media managers Nataliya Gumenyuk and Angelina Kariakina, as well as social activists and communications specialists Tetiana Peklun and Inna Nelles.

Public Interest Journalism Lab is registered in Ukraine as a non-governmental non-profit media organization. Lab has conducted its previous research in partnership with the Kharkiv Institute for Social Research, Lviv Media Forum, and the Arena Program, co-directed by Peter Pomerantsev and Anne Applebaum.

Since the Russian invasion of Ukraine in 2022, PIJL has been focused on covering events in Ukraine for the international and Ukrainian media, documenting war crimes as part of The Reckoning Project, and creating an online chronicle of Ukrainian resistance as part of the Life in War project.

== About ==
Public Interest Journalism Lab is dedicated to developing journalism that serves the public interest. Together with sociologists and analysts, the organization conducts interdisciplinary research to find out what forms of media materials help reduce polarization in society.

PIJL began its activities by studying the attitudes of Ukrainians towards the COVID-19 pandemic and vaccination and developing recommendations for the media on how to create content on this topic.

After February 24, 2022, following the widespread Russian invasion of Ukraine, the Lab's team focused its efforts on covering the war and supporting Ukrainian journalists and media.

Public Interest Journalism Lab is one of four Ukrainian civil society organizations that received the 2022 NED Democracy Award.

== Projects ==
- The Reckoning Project: Ukraine Testifies is a project that brings together Ukrainian and international journalists, lawyers, and analysts who collect evidence of war crimes in Ukraine to build cases for the courts, as well as prepare media projects for Ukrainian and foreign media and document the modern history of the war against Ukraine. Together with the Lab, headed by Nataliya Gumenyuk, The Reckoning Project was founded in March 2022 by war correspondent Janine Di Giovanni and researcher Peter Pomerantsev.
- 'Life in War' is a multimedia chronicle of Ukrainians' lives against the backdrop of the Russian-Ukrainian war. Lab launched this project in cooperation with the Institute for Human Sciences (Institut für die Wissenschaften vom Menschen, IWM). The materials for "Life in War" are created by journalists, photographers and videographers of the Lab, as well as media partners – journalists, photographers and editorial offices of Ukrainian national and regional media.
- 'Our 30 years' is a multimedia documentary project produced by the Public Interest Journalism Lab to mark the 30th anniversary of Ukraine's independence. The project is dedicated to the history of the 1990s presented by Ukrainians themselves. Lab's team collected memories and reflections of citizens about key events of the 1990s. As a result, 9 documentaries, 20 podcasts, special projects, and dozens of short video testimonies of that time were released on the air and on the platforms of the Public Broadcaster of Ukraine.
- 'How We Will Get Crimea Back' is a multimedia project (a special issue of the magazine and a website) in partnership with NV, which presents the tasks on the way to de-occupation and reintegration of the Crimean peninsula. For this project, the Lab gathered journalists, human rights defenders, activists, and politicians from Crimea, who became the authors of the publication.
- 'The Gongadze Case as a Mirror of an Era' is a documentary multimedia project released on the 20th anniversary of the "cassette scandal" that unfolded after the murder of journalist Georgiy Gongadze. The project includes the documentary 'The Murder of Gongadze: 20 Years of Searching for the Truth' which was released in September 2020 on the Public Broadcaster of Ukraine; audio versions of the film in podcast format and 18 interviews with Ukrainian journalists – Georgiy's colleagues and friends.

== Research ==
- 'Ukraine at 30. From Independence to Interdependence' is a study aimed at finding out what unites and divides Ukrainians after 30 years of independence. For this purpose, the researchers conducted more than 20 focus groups across the country. The Laboratory implemented this study in cooperation with the researchers of the Arena program, which operates on the basis of the London School of Economics and Johns Hopkins University, as well as with specialists from the Kharkiv Institute for Social Research
- 'COVID-19 & VACCINES: Testing and creating content which is trusted by wide audience' is a study and recommendations for the media aimed at finding the form and language of materials that would inspire and increase the trust of different segments of the Ukrainian audience in COVID-19 vaccination and reduce the risks of refusal to vaccinate due to prejudice. The project was implemented jointly by Public Interest Journalism Lab, the Arena program, and the Kharkiv Institute for Social Research.
- 'Why Conspiratorial Propaganda Works and What We Can Do About It' reveals the problem of audience vulnerability and resistance to anti-Western, pro-Kremlin disinformation in Ukraine. Its authors also suggest ways to counter conspiracy narratives, both in Ukraine and in any other country where such thinking is entrenched.
- 'From Memory Wars to a Common Future: Overcoming Polarization in Ukraine' is a study that aims to find out how independent media working in the public interest can create content on historical topics that will help overcome propaganda differences, support a more constructive historical discourse, and encourage Ukrainians to engage in a national dialogue.
