= Military Decision Making Process =

United States Army process

The Military Decision Making Process (MDMP) is a United States Army seven-step process for military decision-making in both tactical and garrison environments. It is indelibly linked to Troop Leading Procedures and Operations orders.

== Process ==
The basic steps in the MDMP are:

1. Receipt of Mission
2. Mission Analysis
3. Course of action (COA) Development
4. COA Analysis
5. COA Comparison
6. COA Approval
7. Orders Production, Dissemination, and Transition

== Drawbacks ==
MDMP can be both slow and burdensome at lower levels, where small staffs do not have the manpower nor expertise to dissect each layer of higher headquarters' orders. The MDMP is intended as a planning tool for the primary staff of battalion sized units and larger as opposed to the "Troop Leading Procedures", which are used to guide units subordinate to battalions.

This process is not, according to doctrine, conducted below the battalion level.

== Mnemonic/acronym ==
MADACAP - A mnemonic or acronym for remembering and implementing the military planning process. Receive the Mission, Conduct Mission Analysis, Courses of Action Development, Courses of Action Analysis, Courses of Action Comparison, Course of Action Approval, and Orders Production. The acronym allows the planner to quickly relate the planning process through a single word allowing the planning process to glide smoothly without reaching out for doctrine to refer back to getting the steps in order. Ideal for students and junior personnel to remember the planning process. Mission, Analysis, Develop, Analyze, Compare, Approve, Produce. M.A.D.A.C.A.P.

Although available, this mnemonic is rarely (if ever) used during the conduct of the MDMP. The process is conducted by staffs operating at battalion and higher levels conducting deliberate planning, often with resources including staff estimates, publications, and computers with internet access. The "on the fly" need for a mnemonic for the MDMP is unnecessary except possibly for use when answering military trivia questions, such as during an NCO or Soldier of the month board, or on an exam at a military service school.
