= Troop Leading Procedures =

United States military policy

The Troop Leading Procedures (TLP) are a systematic approach to planning, preparing, and executing military operations at the small-unit level, particularly in the U.S. Army and Marine Corps. It extends the Military Decision-Making Process (MDMP) to the small-unit level, placing primary responsibility for planning on the commander or small-unit leader. The TLP is a dynamic process used by small-unit leaders to analyze a mission, develop a plan, and prepare for an operation. It is designed to be a flexible and adaptable framework for leaders to make timely decisions and ensure successful mission execution. The TLP consists of a series of steps that can be completed in any order or concurrently, serving as guideposts for small unit leaders to utilize their resources effectively.

== Steps of Troop Leading Procedures ==
The TLP consists of eight steps, which are designed to be flexible and adaptable to different situations. These steps are as follows:

1. Receive the Mission: Subordinate leaders receive the mission order, which can be in the form of a warning order, operations order (OPORD), or fragmentary order (FRAGO).
2. Issue a Warning Order: The leader issues a warning order to provide initial guidance to subordinates and begin the planning process.
3. Make a Tentative Plan: The leader develops a tentative plan based on the information available at the time.
4. Initiate Movement: Subordinate leaders begin preparing troops, equipment, and supplies for the upcoming mission.
5. Conduct Reconnaissance: The leader conducts reconnaissance to gather information about the area of operation (AO) and verify the terrain analysis.
6. Complete the Plan: The leader finalizes the plan, making any necessary adjustments based on new information or changes in the situation.
7. Issue the Order: The leader issues the operations order (OPORD) to communicate the plan to subordinates.
8. Supervise and Refine: The leader supervises the execution of the plan, making adjustments as necessary to ensure its success.

These steps are not always linear and can be adapted to the specific needs of the mission or situation.
