= Kyivstoner =

Ukrainian rapper (born 1991)

Kyivstoner Київстонер

Background information
- Born: Albert Viktorovych Vasyliev; December 31, 1991 (age 34); Kyiv, Ukraine
- Genre: Hip hop
- Occupations: Rapper; video blogger; actor
- Years active: 2014–present
- Label: Gazgolder

Albert Viktorovich Vasiliev (American name: Slevin Dadyan; born December 31, 1991, Kyiv), better known as Kyivstoner (Russian: Киевсто́нер) is a Ukrainian video blogger, actor, rapper, and former participant in the project "Grybi." He has been creating humorous video blogs since the late 2010s.

== Biography ==
His real name is Albert (in his Ukrainian passport) & Slevin (in his American passport).

During the major esports tournament The Kiev Major, which took place in Kyiv in April 2017, Kyivstoner was a special correspondent for the Ukrainian esports organization Natus Vincere.

=== Alleged assassination plots (2026) ===
In August 2026, Polish Internal Security Agency arrested a Russian national on suspicion of planning to murder Kyivstoner on behalf of Russian intelligence. Prime minister Donald Tusk said it was the first time Russia ordered the assassination of an American citizen while in a NATO country.

In November 2026, Danish broadcaster DR reported that two Danish men were suspected of having been recruited by Russian intelligence services to assassinate Kyivstoner ahead of a scheduled concert on 25 September 2026 in Charlottenlund, Denmark. The suspects were arrested before the performance after police stopped a vehicle containing several weapons. The concert was subsequently cancelled. Both men denied the allegations but were charged with assisting a foreign intelligence service, as well as attempted murder.

In response to the assassination plot, Denmark’s foreign minister Lars Løkke Rasmussen said Russia’s defense attache Vladimir Grekov would be expelled from Denmark.

== Discography ==
=== Albums ===
- 2017 — «Хайпоголик (feat. Hustla Beats)»
- 2017 — «Хайпоголик 2 (feat. Hustla Beats)»
- 2018 — «Banger»
- 2019 — «F. O. B (EP)»
- 2020 — «ЛЮТАЯ ПОПСА»
- 2021 — «Легкая атлетика»
- 2022 — «Outta Pocket»
