= Ihor Obolienskyi =

Ukrainian soldier

- Ігор Оболєнський
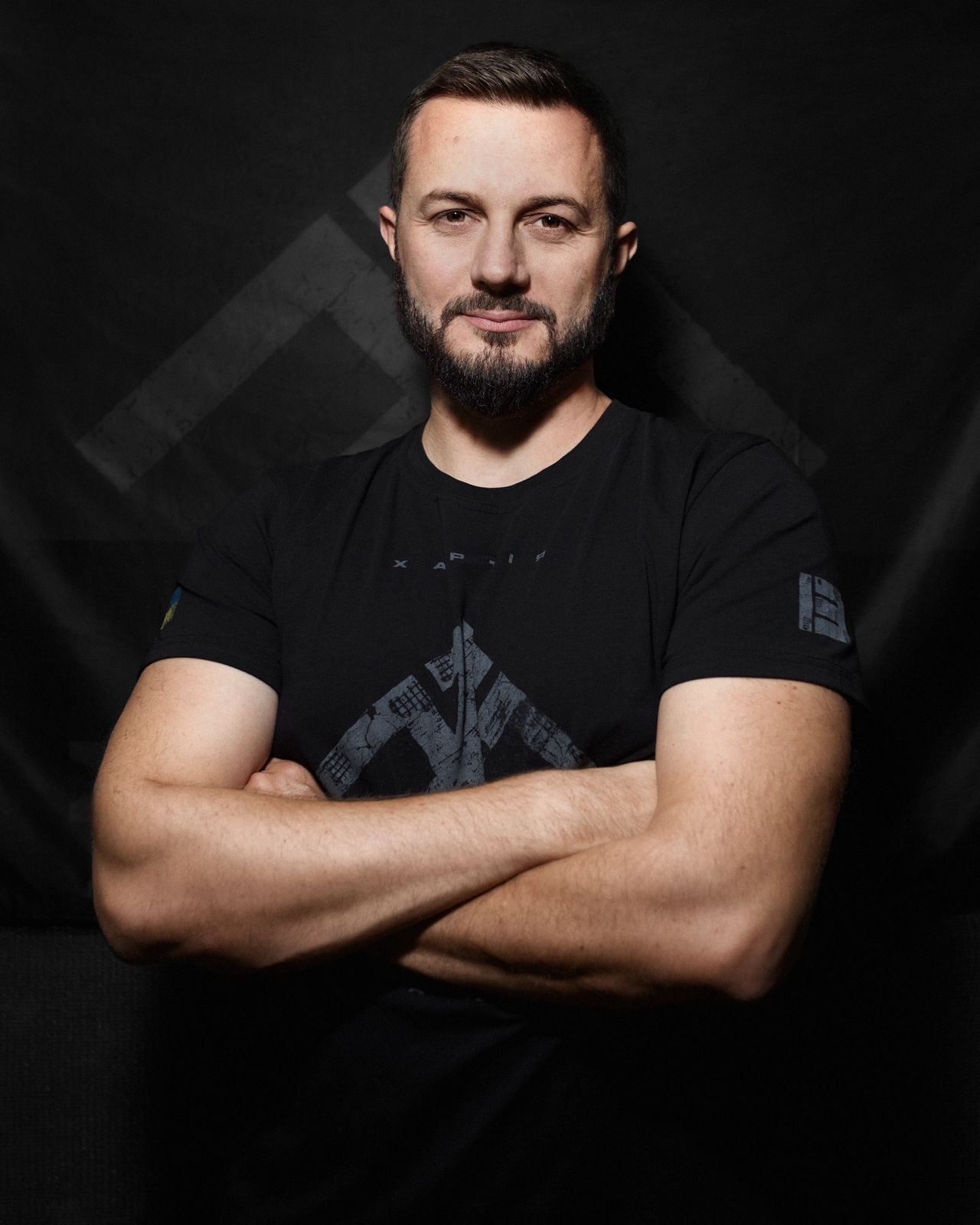

Personal details
- Born: Ihor Heorhiiovych Obolienskyi
- Education: Bohdan Khmelnytsky Military Institute of Missile Forces and Artillery
- Nickname: Kornet (Корнет)

Military service
- Allegiance: Ukraine
- Branch/service: National Guard of Ukraine
- Rank: Brigadier General
- Battles/wars: Russo-Ukrainian War
- Awards: Order of Bohdan Khmelnytsky; Order for Courage; Hero of Ukraine

Ihor Heorhiiovych Obolienskyi (Ukrainian: Ігор Георгійович Оболєнський) is a Ukrainian soldier, Brigadier General of the National Guard of Ukraine, a participant of the Russian-Ukrainian war.

== Biography ==
Graduated from the Bohdan Khmelnytsky Military Institute of Missile Forces and Artillery. Master's degree in law and agronomy. Worked in executive and managerial positions in business companies.

He served in the Armed Forces of Ukraine and the Omega Special Forces. As of 2017, he was the commander of the 1st Battalion of the Rapid Response Brigade of the National Guard of Ukraine.

From 20 March 2023, he has been the commander of the 13th Operational Brigade.

On 15 April 2025, he was appointed the commander of the 2nd Khartia Corps. On 31 July 2026, an assassination attempt was made on Obolienskyi in Kharkiv, but the attempt failed when the gun failed to fire. The suspect, a 69-year-old man, was detained shortly thereafter. According to reports by the Security Service of Ukraine (SBU), the suspect was recruited by Russian intelligence, who posed as officers of the SBU and convinced him that Obolienskyi was a traitor.

== Awards ==
- Hero of Ukraine with the Order of the Gold Star (15 July 2026)
- Order of Bohdan Khmelnytsky, 3rd class (23 August 2024)
- Order for Courage, 3rd class (13 October 2022)

== Military ranks ==
- Colonel
- Lieutenant colonel
