= 2nd Khartiia Corps =

National Guard of Ukraine formation

2nd Corps of the National Guard "Khartiia"
- 2-й корпус Національної гвардії України «Хартія»
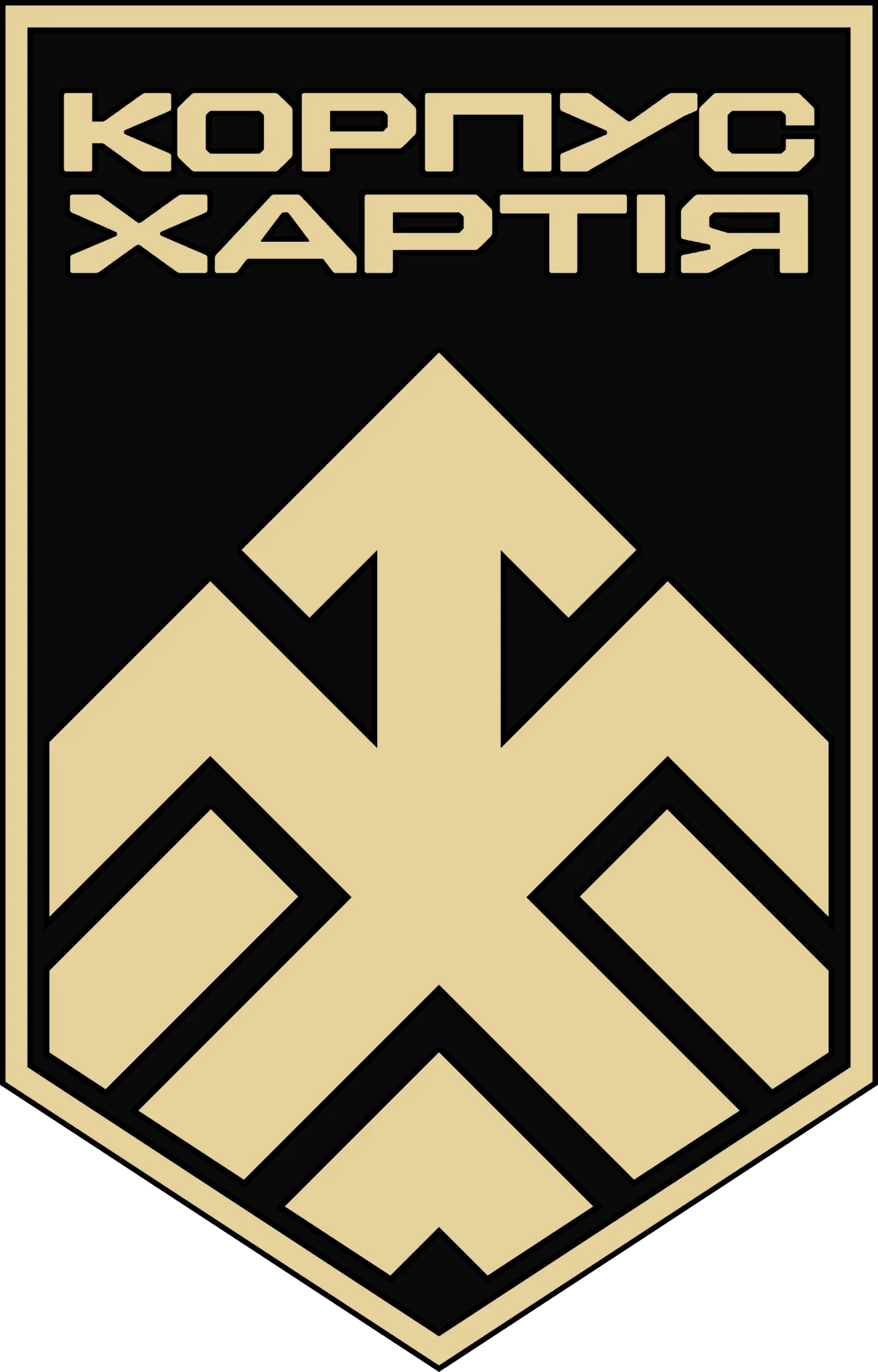
- Active: April 2025 – present
- Country: Ukraine
- Branch: National Guard of Ukraine
- Size: Corps
- Part of: National Guard Headquarters
- Garrison/HQ: Kharkiv, Kharkiv Oblast
- Engagements: Russo-Ukrainian War: Full-scale invasion since 2022; Kupiansk offensive (November–December 2025)

Commanders
- Current commander: Colonel Ihor Obolienskyi

The 2nd Corps of the National Guard of Ukraine "Khartiia" (Note: Ukrainian: 2-й корпус Національної гвардії України «Хартія», romanized: 2-j korpus Nacionaljnoji hvardiji Ukrajiny "Khartija" (DSTU 9112:2021 System B transcription), meaning "charter". Other transcriptions include Khartiia, Khartia, and Khartiya.) is a corps of the National Guard of Ukraine.

== History ==
The 2nd Khartiia Corps was established in April 2025 within the National Guard of Ukraine as part of the transition towards a corps-based system from early 2025 to October 2025. The Khartiia Corps was based on the existing 13th Khartiia Brigade from Kharkiv, a unit with significant experience in combat operations. The Khartiia Brigade was founded as a volunteer unit in 2022 in response to Russia's full-scale invasion, initially as part of the Territorial Defence Forces. In subsequent years, the Khartiia Brigade became known for progressive values, discarding Soviet management styles, implementing NATO standards, and focusing on intelligence and data-driven warfare.

In May 2025, Khartiia launched the first recruitment campaign in Ukraine specifically aimed at women with technical skills for roles such as aerial and ground drone operators, electronic warfare, ISTAR and cybersecurity specialists. In cooperation with NGOs, they managed to enlist many more women than before, who were also more inclined to apply for specific roles such as "communications" or "UAV".

The Khartiia Corps was involved in the successful Ukrainian counterattack at Kupiansk in November–December 2025. In February 2026, The Kyiv Independent highlighted the 2nd Khartiia Corps as one of the three most successful of the 18 newly formed corps. Factors explaining this success were identified as having broad resources, human capital, experienced commanders, deploying advanced technology, and basing future operations on assessed best practices. In May 2026, the Khartiia Corps was involved with building extensive fortifications of 135 kilometres of anti-tank ditches, a ring of tetrahedrons, barbed wire and low-visibility obstacles on the Kharkiv front.

== Structure ==
As of 2026, the corps structure is as follows:

- 2nd Corps of the National Guard of Ukraine "Khartiia"
  - Corps Headquarters
    - Management
    - Commandant Platoon
  - 3rd Spartan Brigade
    - Brigade Command and Headquarters
    - 1st Operational Battalion
    - 2nd Operational Battalion
    - 3rd Operational Battalion
    - 4th Operational Battalion
    - Anti-aircraft Missile Division
    - Medical Center
    - Tank Company
    - Special Intelligence and Reconnaissance Company
    - Support Battalion
    - Reserve Rifle Battalion
  - 4th Rubizh Brigade
    - Brigade Command and Headquarters
    - Headquarters Company
    - 1st Battalion of Operational Assignment
    - 2nd Battalion of Operational Assignment
    - 3rd Battalion of Operational Assignment "Svoboda"
    - 4th Guardsmen Battalion
    - 5th Operational Battalion
    - 6th Guardsmen Battalion
    - Special Intelligence Company
    - Snipers Company
    - Tank Company
    - 4th Field Artillery Regt
    - Anti-Aircraft Defence Battalion
    - Signals Company
    - Combat Service Support Battalion
    - Medical Company
    - Brigade Band
  - 13th Khartiia Brigade
    - Brigade Command and Headquarters
    - 1st Battalion of Operational Assignment
    - 2nd Battalion of Operational Assignment
    - 3rd Battalion of Operational Assignment
    - 4th Battalion of Operational Assignment
    - Tank Company
    - Reconnaissance Battalion
  - 23rd Assault Regiment "R.U.H." (since March 2026; formerly 23rd Assault Battalion in Khartiia Brigade)
    - 1st Assault Battalion
    - 2nd Assault Battalion
    - 3rd Assault Battalion
    - 4th Assault Battalion
    - Hispanos Argo Unit
    - Special Purpose Unmanned Systems Battalion
  - 17th Poltava Brigade
    - Brigade Command and Headquarters
    - Patrol Company
    - Rifle Company
    - Combat and Logistical Support Platoon
    - Informational warfare Platoon
    - Automobile platoon
    - Medical Center
  - 18th Sloviansk Brigade
    - Brigade Command and Headquarters
    - 1st Rifle Battalion
    - 2nd Rifle Battalion
    - 3rd Rifle Battalion
    - Donbas Battalion
    - Guardian Battalion
    - ATGM Company
    - Reserve Rifle Company
    - Combat and Logistical Support Company
    - Automobile Company
    - Howitzer Artillery Battery
    - Special Purpose Reconnaissance Platoon
    - Military band
    - Medical Center
