= The Shins discography =

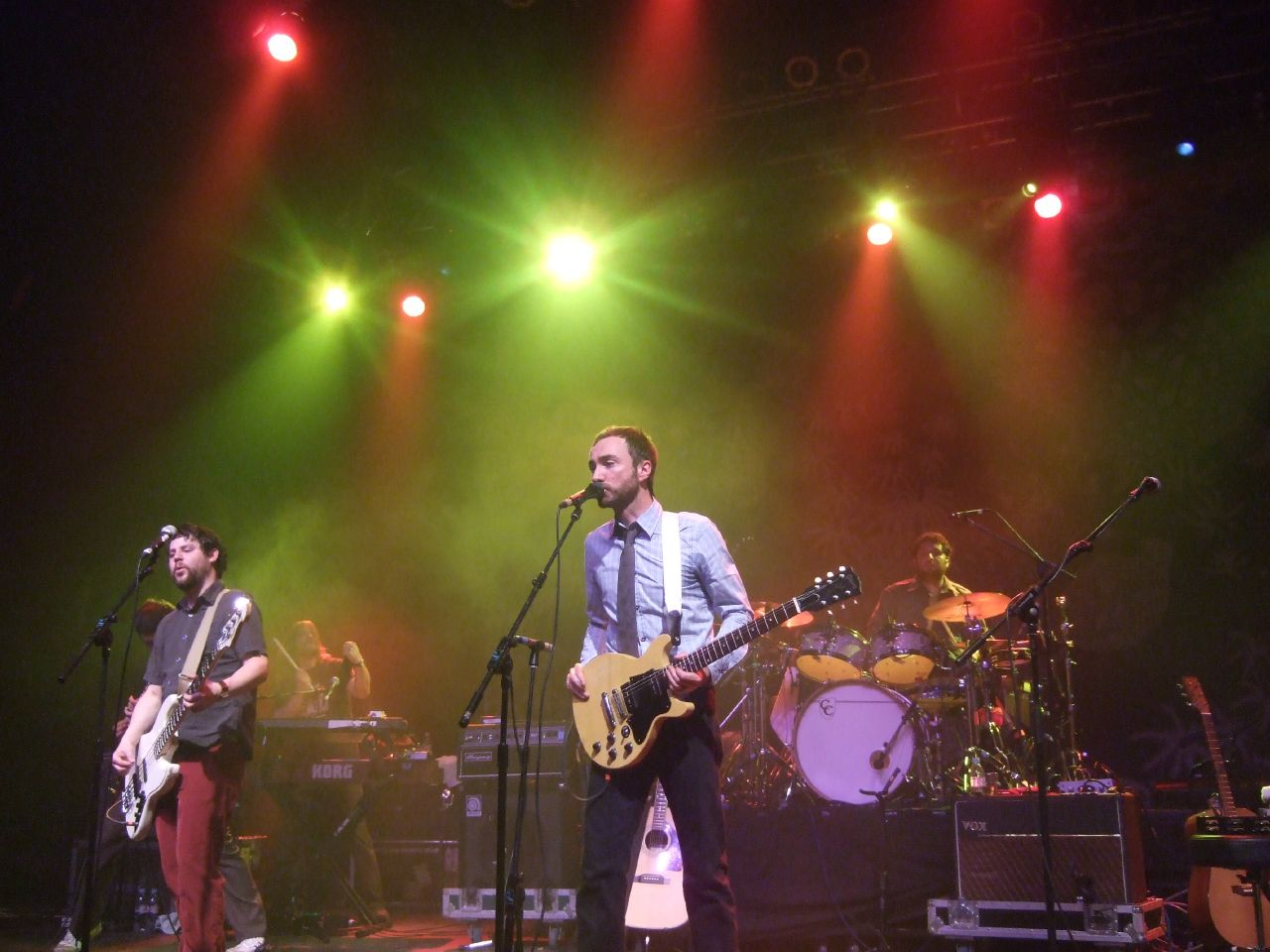
- The Shins performing in 2007.
- Studio albums: 5
- EPs: 3
- Live albums: 1
- Singles: 23
- Music videos: 21
- Remix albums: 1

The discography of American rock band The Shins consists of five studio albums, one live album, one remix album, three extended plays, two splits, twenty-three singles, and twenty one music videos.

== Albums ==
=== Studio albums ===
List of studio albums, with selected chart positions, sales figures and certifications
Title	Album details	Peak chart positions										Certifications
Title	Album details	US	AUS	BEL	CAN	FRA	GER	IRL	NLD	SCO	UK	Certifications
Oh, Inverted World	Released: June 19, 2001 (US); Label: Sub Pop; Formats: CD, LP	168	—	—	—	—	—	—	— (Note: Oh, Inverted World did not enter the Dutch Album Top 100, but entered the Dutch Vinyl 33 chart at number 16.)	50	— (Note: "Oh, Inverted World" did not enter the UK Albums Chart, but peaked at number 33 on the UK Vinyl Albums Chart.)	RIAA: Platinum; BPI: Silver
Chutes Too Narrow	Released: October 21, 2003 (US); Label: Sub Pop; Formats: CD, LP, digital download	86	—	—	—	—	—	—	82	75	82	RIAA: Gold
Wincing the Night Away	Released: January 23, 2007 (US); Label: Sub Pop; Formats: CD, LP, digital download	2	5	39	2	62	44	8	27	17	16	RIAA: Platinum; BPI: Silver
Port of Morrow	Released: March 20, 2012 (US); Label: Columbia; Formats: CD, LP, digital download	3	4	24	7	83	33	14	20	10	11	
Heartworms	Released: March 10, 2017 (US); Label: Columbia; Formats: CD, LP, digital download	20	16	60	36	152	61	18	26	16	19	
"—" denotes a recording that did not chart or was not released in that territory.

=== Live albums ===
List of live albums
Title	Album details
Live at Third Man Records	Released: June 25, 2013 (US); Label: Third Man; Format: LP

=== Remix albums ===
List of remix albums
Title	Album details	Peak chart positions		
Title	Album details	US Sales	NZ Heat	UK Record
The Worm's Heart	Released: January 19, 2018 (US, EU); Label: Aural Apothecary Records, Columbia; Format: CD, LP, digital download	81	10	16

=== Splits ===
List of split releases
Title	Album details	Additional artists
Shade and Honey / Caring Is Creepy, It Is / Lower	Released: 2001 (US); Label: Devil in the Woods; Format: 7"	Sparklehorse; Mates of State
The Gloating Sun / You're Not the Only One / Worry All the Time	Released: February 2004 (US); Label: Devil In The Woods; Format: 7"	Tim Oehmsen with Ramsey Kearney; Denison Witmer
The Fear / The Fear (Flipped) / The Fear by The Shins Covered by Los Lobos	Released: April 21, 2018 (US); Label: Third Man; Format: 12"	Los Lobos

== Extended plays ==
List of extended plays
Title	Details
Nature Bears a Vacuum	Released: 1999 (US); Label: Omnibus Records; Format: 7"
Live Session EP (iTunes Exclusive)	Released: April 4, 2007 (US); Label: Sub Pop; Format: Digital download
Port of Morrow Acoustic EP	Released: March 20, 2012 (US); Label: Columbia; Format: Digital download

== Singles ==
=== Main singles ===
List of singles, with selected chart positions and certifications, showing year released and album name
Title	Year	Peak chart positions										Certifications	Album
Title	Year	US	US Rock	AUS	BEL	CAN Rock	JPN	MEX	SCO	SWI	UK	Certifications	Album
"When I Goose-Step"	1999	—	—	—	—	—	—	—	—	—	—		non-album single
"New Slang"	2001	—	—	—	—	—	—	—	—	—	—	RIAA: 2× Platinum; BPI: Silver	Oh, Inverted World
"Know Your Onion!"	2002	— (Note: "Know Your Onion!" did not enter the Billboard Hot 100, but peaked at number 42 on the Hot Singles Sales chart.)	—	—	—	—	—	—	—	—	154		Oh, Inverted World
"So Says I"	2003	— (Note: "So Says I" did not enter the Billboard Hot 100, but peaked at number 14 on the Hot Singles Sales chart.)	—	—	—	—	—	—	82	—	73		Chutes Too Narrow
"Fighting in a Sack"	2004	—	—	—	—	—	—	—	—	—	94		Chutes Too Narrow
"Pink Bullets"	2005	—	—	—	—	—	—	—	—	—	—		Chutes Too Narrow
"Phantom Limb"	2006	86	— (Note: "Phantom Limb" did not enter the Billboard Hot Rock & Alternative Songs chart, but peaked at number 16 on the Alternative Airplay chart.)	100	—	37	—	—	17	—	42	RIAA: Gold	Wincing the Night Away
"Australia"	2007	—	—	—	—	—	—	—	21	—	62	RIAA: Gold	Wincing the Night Away
"Turn on Me"	2007	—	—	—	—	—	—	—	62	—	— (Note: "Turn on Me" did not enter the UK Singles Chart, but peaked at number 56 on the UK Physical Singles Chart Top 100.)		Wincing the Night Away
"Sea Legs"	2007	—	—	—	—	—	—	—	—	—	—		Wincing the Night Away
"Simple Song"	2012	— (Note: "Simple Song" did not chart on the Billboard Hot 100 but did peak at number 6 on the Bubbling Under Hot 100 Singles chart, which is an extension of the Billboard Hot 100.)	19	—	54	25	96	30	—	95	192		Port of Morrow
"No Way Down (Swift Sessions)"	2012	— (Note: "No Way Down" did not enter the Billboard Hot 100, but peaked at number 21 on the Hot Singles Sales chart.)	—	—	81	—	—	—	—	—	— (Note: "No Way Down / Fall of '82" did not enter the UK Singles Chart, but peaked at number 67 on the UK Physical Singles Chart Top 100.)		non-album single
"Dead Alive"	2016	—	—	—	— (Note: "Dead Alive" did not enter the Ultratop Top 50, but spent 4 weeks as an extra tip on the Ultratop Bubbling Under chart.)	—	—	42	—	—	—		Heartworms
"Name for You"	2017	—	32	—	— (Note: "Name for You" did not enter the Ultratop Top 50, but spent 4 weeks as an extra tip on the Ultratop Bubbling Under chart.)	—	—	39	—	—	—		Heartworms
"Half a Million"	2017	—	—	—	—	—	—	—	—	—	—		Heartworms
"Cherry Hearts"	2017	—	—	—	—	—	—	—	—	—	—		Heartworms
"Heartworms (Flipped)"	2018	—	—	—	—	—	—	—	—	—	—		The Worm's Heart
"The Great Divide"	2020	—	— (Note: "The Great Divide" did not enter the Hot Rock & Alternative Songs chart, but peaked at number 18 on the Adult Alternative Airplay chart.)	—	—	—	—	—	—	—	—		non-album singles
"The Living End"	2026	—	—	—	—	—	—	—	—	—	—		non-album singles
"—" denotes a recording that did not chart or was not released in that territory.

=== Promotional singles ===
List of promotional singles, showing year released and album name
Title	Year	Peaks	Album
Title	Year	BEL	Album
"Kissing the Lipless"	2004	—	Chutes Too Narrow
"Sleeping Lessons"	2007	—	Wincing the Night Away
"Nothing at All"	2007	—	Wincing the Night Away
"It's Only Life"	2012	—	Port of Morrow
"The Rifle's Spiral"	2012	117	Port of Morrow
"No Way Down" / "Know Your Onion!" / "Death Cream"	2012	—	Spotify Sessions
"Name for You" / "Panic"	2017	—	Spotify Sessions
"Waimanalo"	2019	—	non-album single

== Other appearances ==
List of guest appearances, with other performing artists, showing year released and album name
Title	Year	Album
"We Will Become Silhouettes"	2003	"Such Great Heights"
"They'll Soon Discover"	2004	The SpongeBob SquarePants Movie: Music from the Movie and More
"Breathe"	2007	The Saturday Sessions: The Dermot O'Leary Show
"Wipe My Butt"	2008	Awesome Record, Great Songs! Volume One
"It's Okay, Try Again"	2009	Yo Gabba Gabba! Music is... Awesome!
"Plenty Is Never Enough"	2009	Score! 20 Years of Merge Records
"Goodbye Girl"	2010	Levi's Pioneer Sessions: The Revival Recordings
"Wonderful Christmastime"	2012	Holidays Rule
"So Now What"	2014	Wish I Was Here: Music from the Motion Picture

== Music videos ==
List of music videos, showing year released and director
Title	Year	Director(s)
"New Slang"	2001	Lance Bangs
"Know Your Onion!"	2002	Lance Bangs
"The Past and Pending"	2003	Matt McCormick
"So Says I"	2003	Plates Animation
"Kissing the Lipless"	2004	Your Mom Films
"New Slang"	2004	The Malloys
"Saint Simon"	2004	Your Mom Films
"Pink Bullets"	2005	Adam Bizanski
"Phantom Limb"	2006	Patrick Daughters
"Australia"	2007	Matt McCormick
"Turn on Me"	2007	MICHAEL
"Sleeping Lessons"	2007	Antonio Campos
"Simple Song"	2012	DANIELS
"The Rifle's Spiral"	2012	Jamie Caliri
"It's Only Life"	2012	Hiro Murai
"Dead Alive"	2016	Jon Sortland
"Name For You"	2017	Jon Sortland
"Name For You (Flipped)"	2017	Zaiba Jabbar
"Half a Million"	2017	LAMAR+NIK
"Cherry Hearts"	2017	seenfilm
"The Great Divide"	2020	Paul Trillo

== As Flake Music ==
=== Studio album ===
- When You Land Here, It's Time to Return (1997)

=== EP ===
- Spork EP (1995)

=== Singles ===
- Scared of Chaka / Flake Music - split 7-inch (702 Records / Science Project) (1997)
- Sue Defender (1996)
