= List of songs recorded by the Shins =

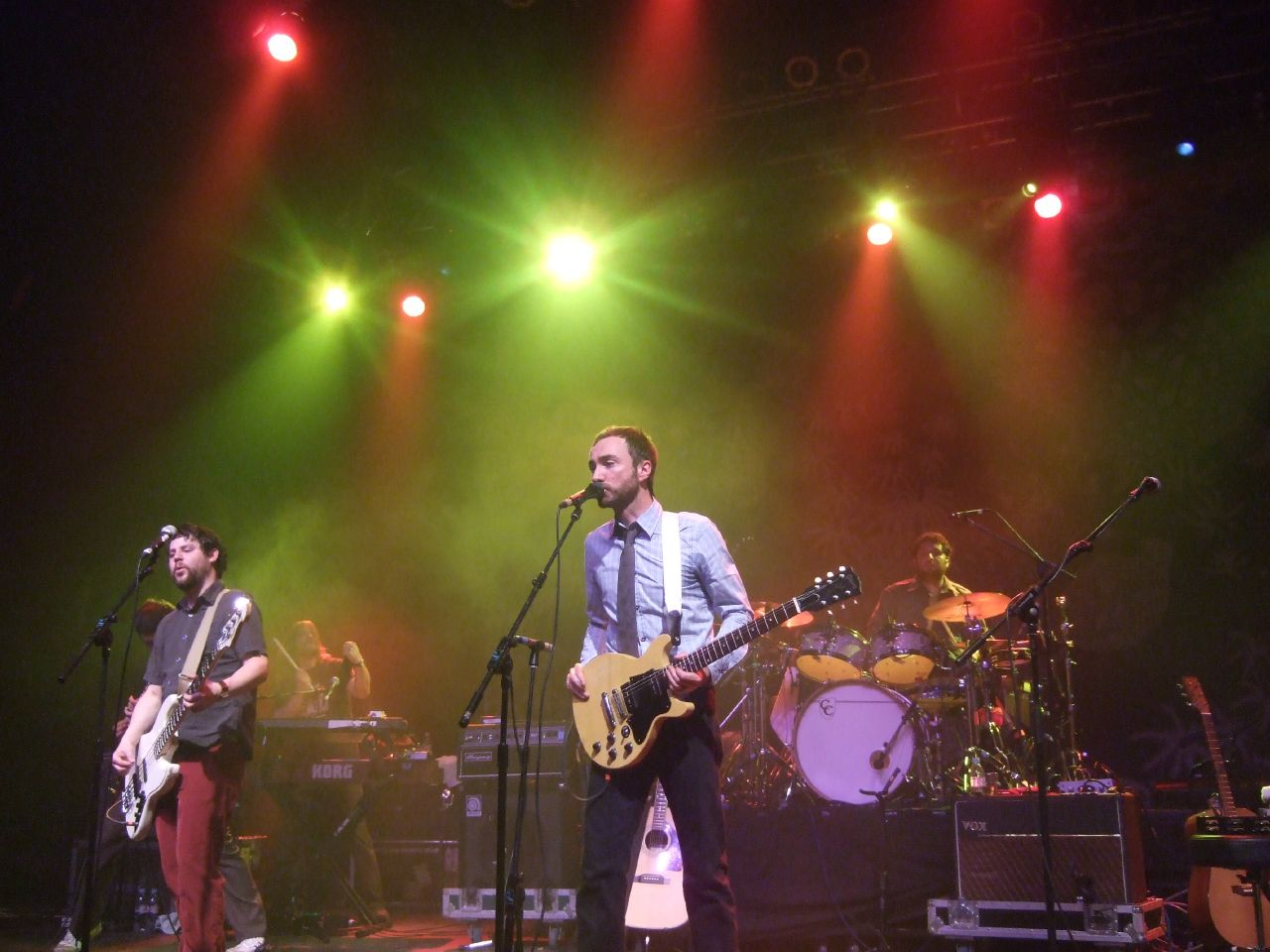
The Shins performing in 2007.

American rock band The Shins have recorded songs for four studio albums, compilation appearances and bonus tracks.

== Songs ==
Key
†	Indicates single release

Song	Album	Year	Ref.
"A Comet Appears"	Wincing the Night Away	2007	
"Australia" †	Wincing the Night Away	2007	
"Baby Boomerang" (cover of T. Rex)	Fighting in a Sack	2004	
"Bait and Switch"	Port of Morrow	2012	
"Black Wave"	Wincing the Night Away	2007	
"Breathe" (cover of Pink Floyd)	The Saturday Sessions: The Dermot O'Leary Show	2007	
"Caring Is Creepy"	Oh, Inverted World	2001	
"The Celibate Life"	Oh, Inverted World	2001	
"Cherry Hearts" †	Heartworms	2017	
"Dead Alive" †	Heartworms	2017	
"Death Cream" (cover of Sonny & The Sunsets)	Spotify Sessions	2012	
"Eating Styes from Elephants' Eyes"	Nature Bears a Vacuum	1999	
"Fall of '82"	Port of Morrow	2012	
"Fantasy Island"	Heartworms	2017	
"The Fear"	Heartworms	2017	
"Fighting in a Sack" †	Chutes Too Narrow	2003	
"For a Fool"	Port of Morrow	2012	
"Girl Inform Me"	Oh, Inverted World	2001	
"Girl on the Wing"	Oh, Inverted World	2001	
"Girl Sailor"	Wincing the Night Away	2007	
"The Gloating Sun"	"When I Goose-Step"	1999	
"Goodbye Girl" (cover of Squeeze)	Levi's Pioneer Sessions: The Revival Recordings	2010	
"Gone for Good"	Chutes Too Narrow	2003	
"Half a Million"	Heartworms	2017	
"Heartworms"	Heartworms	2017	
"It's Okay, Try Again"	Yo Gabba Gabba! Music is Awesome!	2009	
"It's Only Life" †	Port of Morrow	2012	
"Kissing the Lipless"	Chutes Too Narrow	2003	
"Know Your Onion!" †	Oh, Inverted World	2001	
"Mild Child"	Chutes Too Narrow	2003	
"Mildenhall" †	Heartworms	2017	
"Mine's Not a High Horse"	Chutes Too Narrow	2003	
"My Seventh Rib"	Nature Bears a Vacuum	1999	
"Name For You" †	Heartworms	2017	
"Never Gonna Wipe My Butt" (Tim & Eric featuring The Shins)	Awesome Record, Great Songs! Volume One	2008	
"New Slang" †	Oh, Inverted World	2001	
"Nothing at All"	Wincing the Night Away	2007	
"No Way Down"	Port of Morrow	2012	
"One by One All Day"	Oh, Inverted World	2001	
"Pam Berry"	Wincing the Night Away	2007	
"Painting a Hole" †	Heartworms	2017	
"Pariah King"	Port of Morrow	2012	
"The Past and Pending"	Oh, Inverted World	2001	
"Phantom Limb" †	Wincing the Night Away	2007	
"Pink Bullets"	Chutes Too Narrow	2003	
"Plenty Is Never Enough" (cover of Tenement Halls)	SCORE! Merge Records: The First 20 Years	2009	
"Port of Morrow"	Port of Morrow	2012	
"Pressed in a Book"	Oh, Inverted World	2001	
"Red Rabbits"	Wincing the Night Away	2007	
"The Rifle's Spiral"	Port of Morrow	2012	
"Rubber Ballz"	Heartworms	2017	
"Saint Simon"	Chutes Too Narrow	2003	
"Sea Legs" †	Wincing the Night Away	2007	
"September"	Port of Morrow	2012	
"Simple Song" †	Port of Morrow	2012	
"Sleeping Lessons"	Wincing the Night Away	2007	
"Sphagnum Esplanade"	"New Slang"; Oh, Inverted World	2001	
"Split Needles"	Wincing the Night Away	2007	
"So Now What"	Wish I Was Here: Music from the Motion Picture, Heartworms	2014	
"So Says I" †	Chutes Too Narrow	2003	
"A Taste of Honey" (cover of Bobby Scott and Ric Marlow)	Resistance Radio: The Man in the High Castle Album	2017	
"They'll Soon Discover"	The SpongeBob SquarePants Movie – Music from the Movie and More...	2004	
"Those Bold City Girls"	Nature Bears a Vacuum	1999	
"Those to Come"	Chutes Too Narrow	2003	
"Turn a Square"	Chutes Too Narrow	2003	
"Turn on Me" †	Wincing the Night Away	2007	
"The Waltz Is Over"	Port of Morrow	2012	
"We Built a Raft and We Floated"	Nature Bears a Vacuum	1999	
"Weird Divide"	Oh, Inverted World	2001	
"We Will Become Silhouettes" (cover of The Postal Service)	"Such Great Heights"	2003	
"When I Goose-Step"	"When I Goose-Step"	1999	
"Wonderful Christmastime" (cover of Paul McCartney)	Holidays Rule	2012	
"Young Pilgrims"	Chutes Too Narrow	2003	
"Your Algebra"	Oh, Inverted World	2001	
"40 Mark Strasse"	Port of Morrow	2012	

== See also ==
- The Shins discography
