= Garden State (soundtrack) =

2004 soundtrack album by various artists

Soundtrack album by Various Artists
- Released: August 10, 2004
- Genres: Soundtrack; Indie rock
- Length: 52:55
- Labels: Epic Records; Fox Music
- Producer: Zach Braff

Professional ratings
Review scores
Source	Rating
Allmusic	3.5/5 stars
Pitchfork Media	(7.0/10)
Rolling Stone	3.5/5 stars

Garden State is the soundtrack album to the 2004 film Garden State. Compilation producer Zach Braff was awarded a Grammy Award for Best Compilation Soundtrack Album for Motion Pictures, Television or Other Visual Media at the 47th Annual Grammy Awards for his work on the album.

== Album information ==
The music that accompanied the film was hand-picked by Zach Braff. Commenting on the selections, Braff said, "Essentially, I made a mix CD with all of the music that I felt was scoring my life at the time I was writing the screenplay."

The film’s budget limitations meant that obtaining all the songs Braff wanted for the film proved difficult, but Braff felt that the soundtrack was so integral to the script, he sent a copy of it with every request he sent out.

The music in the film features a number of indie-rock artists, notably the Shins. In an early scene, Sam (Natalie Portman) passes Andrew Largeman (Braff) a headset which is playing the song "New Slang" by the Shins as she says "You gotta hear this one song — it’ll change your life; I swear." A second Shins song, "Caring Is Creepy", is also featured on the soundtrack.

== Songs that did not appear on the album ==
The song "Orange Sky" by Alexi Murdoch was also featured in the movie, but did not appear on the soundtrack, as the rights to the song were owned by Fox's The O.C. It was played between "New Slang" and "I Just Don't Think I'll Ever Get Over You" in the film. The song "Hey Lil' Momma" by the Sho-Shot AllStars is playing in the background of the party scene where Jesse (Armando Riesco) reveals selling his silent Velcro patent. Later during the party the song "Whitey" by Everlast is playing in the background during a game of spin the bottle in the interlude between portions of the song "In the Waiting Line".

Additionally, "Love Will Come Through" by Travis was used in the film’s trailer, but never made it into the film or onto its soundtrack. The trailer also featured "Such Great Heights" in the original version by the Postal Service rather than the Iron & Wine cover used in the film. The song "Chocolate" by Snow Patrol appeared in the commercials but didn't appear on the soundtrack. The song "Adelita" by Francisco Tárrega was played on guitar by Mark (Peter Sarsgaard) when he was talking to Andrew in his room, and played on the video of Sam ice skating in the alligator costume. Also, "Three Times A Lady" by Lionel Richie is sung during the funeral scene. Neither song appears on the soundtrack. Additional instrumental composition by Chad Fischer "Motorcycle Ride with Sam" was featured in the DVD menu.

== Reception ==
Zach Braff received a Grammy Award in 2005 for Best Compilation Soundtrack Album for a Motion Picture, Television or Other Visual Media at the 47th Annual Grammy Awards. The Broadcast Film Critics Association nominated it for Best Soundtrack at the 10th Critics' Choice Awards.

Commenting on the soundtrack’s importance to the film, Sponic Zine wrote

"Braff did a masterful job of choosing songs that exemplified the emotional subtleties in the film… he put together a group of songs that complement each other perfectly and, when put together into one album, create something amazing, almost as if they never should have been apart."

The album has sold over 1.3 million copies and has been certified as platinum by the Recording Industry Association of America.

== In popular culture ==
In an episode of Saturday Night Live hosted by Braff, Braff plays a high school student in a skit where various high school interest groups are attempting to select a theme for the upcoming senior prom. Braff’s character suggests a Garden State theme because the soundtrack "changed [his] life", but the prom committee describes it as a "Pitchfork mix CD". Braff's character replies that he happens to know "...those songs were very carefully chosen"; nevertheless, the idea is quickly dismissed. He then puts on headphones with the sound of "New Slang" by the Shins playing in the background.

== Track listing ==
No.	Title	Writer(s)	Producer(s)	Length
1.	"Don't Panic" (Coldplay)	Guy Berryman; Jon Buckland; Will Champion; Chris Martin	Ken Nelson; Coldplay	2:17
2.	"Caring Is Creepy" (The Shins)	James Mercer	James Mercer; The Shins	3:20
3.	"In the Waiting Line" (Zero 7)	Henry Binns; Sam Hardaker; Sophie Barker	Zero 7	4:33
4.	"New Slang" (The Shins)	James Mercer	James Mercer	3:51
5.	"I Just Don't Think I'll Ever Get Over You" (Colin Hay)	Colin Hay	Dave Dale; Colin Hay	5:18
6.	"Blue Eyes" (Cary Brothers)	Cary Brothers	Chad Fischer	4:18
7.	"Fair" (Remy Zero)	August Cinjun Tate; Shelby Tate; Cedric Lemoyne; Jeffrey Cain Thompson; Gregory Scott Slay	David Bottrill; Remy Zero (co.)	3:54
8.	"One of These Things First" (Nick Drake)	Nick Drake	Joe Boyd	4:49
9.	"Lebanese Blonde" (Thievery Corporation)	Rob Garza; Eric Hilton	Rob Garza; Eric Hilton	4:46
10.	"The Only Living Boy in New York" (Simon & Garfunkel)	Paul Simon	Paul Simon; Art Garfunkel; Roy Halee	3:59
11.	"Such Great Heights" (Iron & Wine)	Ben Gibbard; Jimmy Tamborello	Sam Beam	4:12
12.	"Let Go" (Frou Frou)	Imogen Heap; Guy Sigsworth	Imogen Heap; Guy Sigsworth	4:12
13.	"Winding Road" (Bonnie Somerville)	Bonnie Somerville; David Weisberg	Chad Fischer	3:27
Total length:				52:55

== See also ==
- The Last Kiss soundtrack
- Wish I Was Here soundtrack

== Certifications ==
Region	Certification	Certified units/sales
Canada (Music Canada)	Gold	50,000^{^}
United States (RIAA)	Platinum	1,000,000^{^}
^{^} Shipments figures based on certification alone.
