= Rubber Ball (disambiguation) =

"Rubber Ball" is a 1961 song by Bobby Vee.

Rubber Ball may also refer to:

- Bouncy ball, toy
- "Rubber Ball", a song by Cage The Elephant from Thank You Happy Birthday
- "Rubber Ballz", a song by The Shins from Heartworms

== See also ==
- "Red Rubber Ball, a 1966 song first performed by The Cyrcle
