= Port of Morrow (album) =

Studio album by The Shins
- Released: March 19, 2012
- Recorded: May–October 2011
- Studios: Echo Sound (Los Angeles, California)
- Genre: Alternative rock
- Length: 40:13
- Labels: Aural Apothecary, Columbia
- Producers: Greg Kurstin, James Mercer

The Shins chronology
Wincing the Night Away (2007)	Port of Morrow (2012)	Heartworms (2017)

Singles from Port of Morrow
- 1. "Simple Song" Released: January 9, 2012; 2. "It's Only Life" Released: March 16, 2012

Port of Morrow is the fourth studio album by American rock band The Shins. The album was released in the UK on March 19, 2012, and in the US on March 20, 2012, on Aural Apothecary and Columbia Records and was co-produced by Greg Kurstin and frontman James Mercer. The Shins' first studio album in five years, following the release of 2007's Wincing the Night Away, followed major lineup changes in the group. Mercer founded side project Broken Bells with Danger Mouse in 2008, and in 2009, deemed it an "aesthetic decision" to part ways with his bandmates firing founding members Dave Hernandez (bass, guitar), Marty Crandall (keyboards) and Jesse Sandoval (drums).

Primarily a collaboration between Mercer and Kurstin, the album features contributions from former members: Dave Hernandez, Martin Crandall, Eric D. Johnson and Ron Lewis; alongside drummer Joe Plummer, and other studio contributors, including Janet Weiss and Nik Freitas. Mercer penned lyrics based around his newfound fatherhood, the love for his family, as well as nostalgic memories of his childhood in Germany and his rough adolescent transition to the United States. Musically, Port of Morrow is inspired by 1970s German pop and is melodic and heavily layered, while adding a greater emphasis on electronic instrumentation.

The album debuted at number three on the Billboard 200 and received largely favorable reviews from contemporary critics, with some deeming it among the band's best, while others felt it disjointed following the departure of its principal members. The lead single "Simple Song" charted within the top ten on the Billboard alternative charts, representing the band's highest peak chart-wise in their home country. Upon release, independent record stores were exclusively given a bonus acoustic EP bundled with the record.

== Background ==
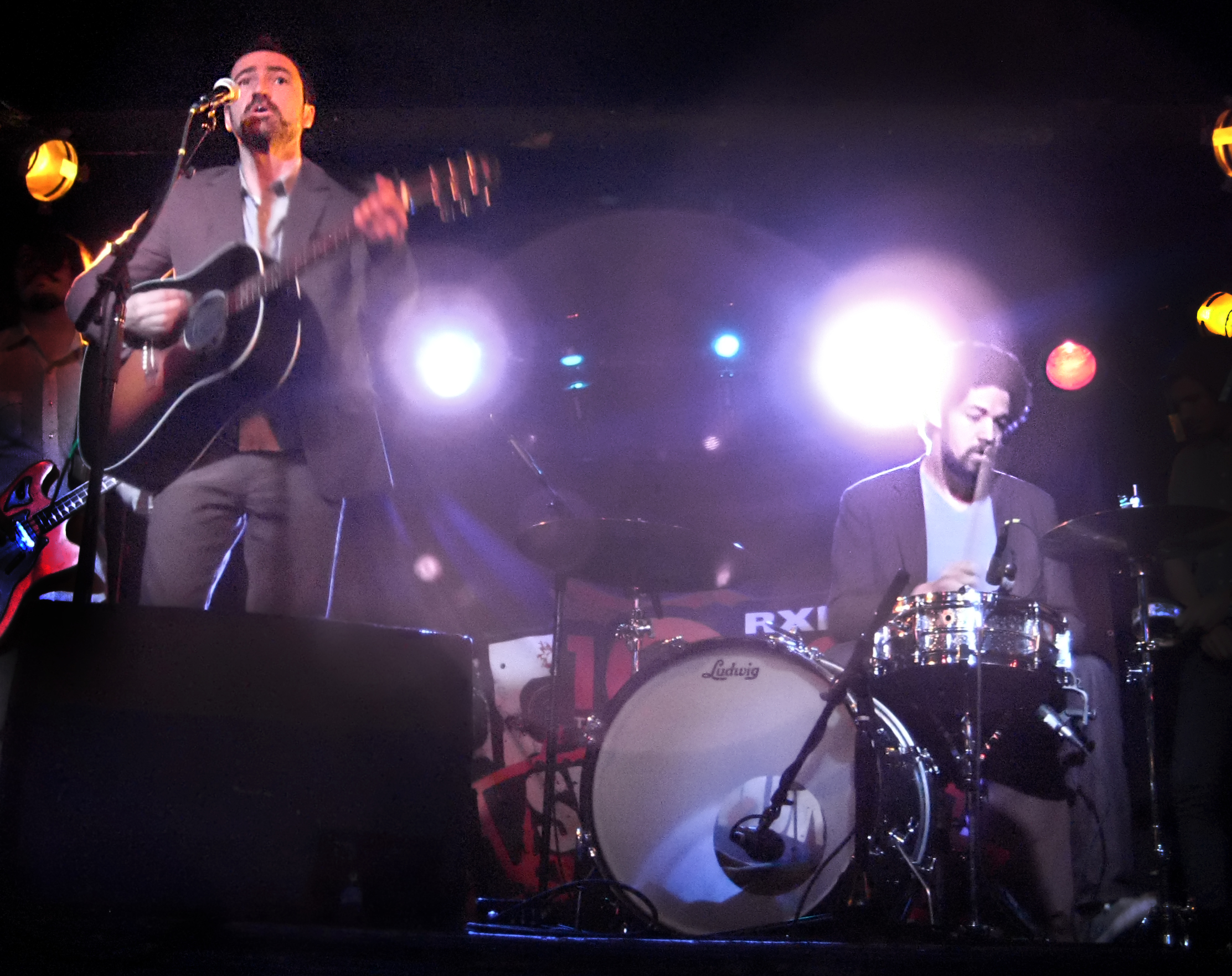
Mercer took a break from The Shins in the late 2000s; in the interim, he formed Broken Bells with Danger Mouse (pictured)

In 2007, The Shins released their third studio album, Wincing the Night Away, which received rave reviews from critics and debuted at number two on the Billboard 200. The album spawned a yearlong tour and snagged a Grammy nomination for Best Alternative Music Album. Having worked on The Shins for nearly a decade, frontman James Mercer felt exhausted and ready to quit the band. "Mainly I was tired of being right in the middle and everything sort of revolving around me, including the friendship dynamics-slash-bandmate dynamics and the creative aspect," Mercer explained in 2012. Noting that the band had never been bigger, some aspects of the limelight made him uncomfortable: "I had never been someone who was ever in the center of any kind of social circle." Mercer was approached by Brian Burton (Danger Mouse) around this same period regarding a possible collaboration on a new project, which became Broken Bells.

Mercer was initially intimidated to commit to the project, but felt differently after attending the memorial service for actor Heath Ledger in 2008. Mercer felt very shy in contrast to Ledger; he observed Ledger was very engaged in conversation and held deep relationships. Noting that the outpouring of emotion at the service changed him, Mercer decided to change his pace and began saying "yes" to new experiences. Enjoying the fresh approach with Broken Bells in regards to meeting new musicians, Mercer desired to continue that feeling. Mercer parted ways with longtime bandmates Dave Hernandez, Marty Crandall and Jesse Sandoval, terming it "an aesthetic decision." Sandoval instead told The Portland Mercury he was "unequivocally fired" from the group. Sandoval elaborated on Mercer's decision, noting that "When I think about this, probably if James really had complete say in it, he would have killed the Shins." Mercer would later relate that his decision was "tremendously difficult," but instead wished to view it as a new phase. When Mercer made a comment in NME that he was drawn to Broken Bells because The Shins "had started to feel heavy," fans of the band began to speculate that the band was perhaps over.

Port of Morrow was in the earliest stages of development in early 2009, when Mercer debuted such tracks as "The Rifle's Spiral" at live performances. Working with Burton on Broken Bells helped Mercer overcome fears of collaboration, which in turn influenced the rotating "cast of characters" that grouped together around him to record Port of Morrow. Mercer returned to The Shins as the only original member. "I always loved these auteurs who presented themselves as bands," Mercer later explained, referencing Neutral Milk Hotel and Lilys as examples, which led to him feeling as though he could pursue something similar, allowing the concept of The Shins to carry on. For Port of Morrow, The Shins left their longtime label, Sub Pop, for Mercer's own label, Aural Apothecary.

== Artwork and recording ==
Producer Greg Kurstin had a particular influence on Port of Morrow, encouraging Mercer to experiment in the studio. During the recording, Mercer was commuting each week, flying from Portland to Los Angeles to record with producer Greg Kurstin at his studio. Mercer brought songs written as far back as 2007, such as "Simple Song," which was written on the living room floor of his former house. Former Shins bandmates Marty Crandall and Dave Hernandez appear as guest musicians on Port of Morrow. Feeling that both musicians have a certain tone and style that would suit a song, Mercer simply called them up to ask regardless of any possible acrimony. While working on the album, Mercer felt he might have waited too long to record a follow-up, fearing that he might be in a similar situation as The Stone Roses, whose reputation fell hard when they waited five years to record a sophomore record.

Regarding the album's artwork, artist Jacob Escobedo stated, "After working with James Mercer on Broken Bells, he came to me about this Shins album. He sent references of old Eastern European book covers with skulls and psychedelic faces. So I explored three different rounds of creative. Each time getting closer to what he was looking for. In the final round, I scanned a cross cut of a rock which formed that mountain and put this spirit made of feathers on top. He immediately loved it, but thought it needed a Hopi-inspired mask because he grew up in New Mexico. So he sent me all this great inspiration and it slowly evolved into that cover. If you look closely we’ve filled that smoke coming down the mountain with naked ladies at James’ request. [...] It's pure Hopi psychedelic spookiness."

== Music ==
=== Composition ===
Port of Morrow incorporates a palette of vintage-inspired sounds inspired by Mercer and producer Greg Kurstin's upbringing in Germany in the 1970s. The German imagery found on Port of Morrow was inspired by avant-garde pop, artists such as Faust and Can, as well as Brian Eno's production work. An instrumental break in "Fall of '82," for example, features a trumpet solo performed by Nathaniel Walcott. The vintage element was inspired by bands such as Steely Dan and Chicago. Spin called Port of Morrow a "brighter, poppier beast than previous ventures, filled with spacey '70s keyboards and surprisingly straightforward lyrics." The instrumental arrangements on Port of Morrow are highly layered, which an extension of Mercer's desire to make the songs "as interesting and engaging as possible."

=== Lyrics ===
When writing ["Port of Morrow"], it popped into my head and I was thinking of it as death, like what’s beyond the exit point, the 'port of morrow', the port into tomorrow? [...] Everyone’s future is death. That’s a very dark way to look at it, but in the song it just happened to fit in with that thing. Like the ace of spades, port of morrow, life is death, death is life.

— James Mercer on the album's title track

Mercer has stated in interviews that the main themes on Port of Morrow include love (inspired by his newfound domestic life and fatherhood) and the dual nature of life—the beautiful and the grotesque—being intertwined. "The Rifle's Spiral", the album's first track, is written from the perspective of a man who finances suicide bombings, and contains elements of Mercer's distrust and fear of religion which can fuel violence. "Simple Song", in stark contrast, is a love song based on confidence gained during a very strong relationship; Mercer was inspired to write the song for his wife. "It's Only Life" takes root in friendship, specifically pulling a friend out of despair. "Bait and Switch" was written about a situation in which a man is taken for granted in a relationship he falls into by a woman "who's just way too much for him to handle." The album's fifth track, "September", returns to themes of love and is written for Mercer's wife, detailing the story of how they met in the month of September. "No Way Down" was inspired by an article Mercer read regarding the American trade deficit and its effects on the nation's economy. "For a Fool" was envisioned by Mercer as a country song inspired by various relationships, and was written from the perspective of a man talking about his lost love.

"Fall of '82" is directly inspired by events from Mercer's own life, detailing his rough transition from his childhood in Germany to New Mexico. The trip resulted in a period of anxiety that Mercer was able to overcome when his oldest sister, whom he regarded as both motherly and "cool" enough to recall the "weirdness of adolescence," moved back in with the family. "40 Mark Strasse" is also pulled from Mercer's childhood and named after a certain stretch on the route to Ramstein Air Base, where he lived. The stretch was named by G.I.'s for "where you can go get a hooker for 40 marks," and Mercer observed several underage prostitutes "shivering in bus shelters in short shorts in the cold." With that inspiration, Mercer crafted the song as a tale of a young German boy living in an apartment complex with one of the high-school-age girls, with whom he becomes infatuated without knowing her overnight activities. Lastly, the album's title track, "Port of Morrow", is named after an industrial port on the Columbia River, which Mercer would see while driving. Upon the album's release, Mercer stated that he had not yet visited Port of Morrow: "I looked it up online the other night because people are asking me now over here, so I looked it up. It’s this industrial port and very boring."

== Singles ==
- On January 9, 2012, the first single, "Simple Song", was released via the band's website.

== Reception ==
Professional ratings
Aggregate scores
Source	Rating
AnyDecentMusic?	7.0/10
Metacritic	72/100
Review scores
Source	Rating
AllMusic	3.5/5 stars
The A.V. Club	B−
Entertainment Weekly	B+
The Guardian	3/5 stars
The Independent	4/5 stars
Los Angeles Times	2.5/4 stars
NME	6/10
Pitchfork	8.4/10
Rolling Stone	3.5/5 stars
Spin	7/10

Port of Morrow was released to generally favorable reviews from music critics. Paste was arguably the most positive, calling the record "just so utterly satisfying," elaborating that "Port of Morrow immediately hooks the listener and holds on tight right up until the last few seconds." The Boston Phoenix called it "arguably Mercer's and the Shins' most satisfying achievement," and Entertainment Weekly heralded it as "the band's best album in nearly a decade." Q called Port of Morrow an "album rich in kaleidoscopic colour to contrast the diluted greys of its sleeve, marked with the expert touch of true masters of their art." Pitchfork described the record as "a triumphant return from a project that once risked being reduced to an indie-went-mainstream tagline," opining that, "It's the perfect distillation of the Shins' back catalog [...] But in other ways, its colorful, detail-oriented approach sets it apart from anything Mercer's done before."

Rolling Stone wrote that "[Mercer] nails a balance of economy and sweep, matching the studio lushness he craves with secondhand melodicism [...] Port of Morrow has more of a studio-sculpture auteurist vibe than ever." Heather Phares of Allmusic considered the record more focused than its predecessor, despite the lack of a core band, adding, "There's no pretense of democracy nor of being "indie" here, things that might be easier to decry if these weren't some of Mercer's best songs since Chutes Too Narrow." Mojo called it "a formidable piece of work, repositioning Mercer away from his Pacific Northwest indie rock peer group." In contrast, BBC Music felt it lacked the unity of a central band, calling it a "record with so much clever and excitable beauty, yet strangely disappointing."

Uncut wrote that "The pair's [Mercer and Kurstin] pop instincts ultimately prevail over more esoteric ambitions," and Slant Magazine felt Port of Morrow less important than the band's other works, but did not rule out the likelihood that "many of its subtle strengths will grow more powerful with time." The Chicago Tribune felt the multi-layered sound ("sonic forget-me-nots") did not work in the album's favor, while Alternative Press felt it unchallenging, but still fun: "Its low-key loveliness makes it great for dinner parties where the company is almost as cool as Mercer's pre-Port track record." The A.V. Club wrote that "Mercer has made what amounts to a solo record and needlessly attached it to a band identity that he's outgrown," and the Los Angeles Times held similar sentiments: "The Shins, once the poster act of sing-along-and-cry indie rock, is an identity that Mercer, the only original member left, may have outgrown."

The album was ranked number 48 on Stereogum's list of top 50 albums of 2012.

== Track listing ==
All tracks are written by James Mercer.

No.	Title	Length
1.	"The Rifle's Spiral"	3:30
2.	"Simple Song"	4:15
3.	"It's Only Life"	4:02
4.	"Bait and Switch"	3:23
5.	"September"	3:33
6.	"No Way Down"	3:16
7.	"For a Fool"	3:57
8.	"Fall of '82"	3:48
9.	"40 Mark Strasse"	4:39
10.	"Port of Morrow"	5:50

Bonus tracks
No.	Title	Length
11.	"Pariah King"	4:11
12.	"The Waltz Is Over"	4:41

Port of Morrow acoustic bonus EP
No.	Title	Length
1.	"Simple Song" (acoustic version)	4:00
2.	"September" (acoustic version)	3:26
3.	"It's Only Life" (acoustic version)	4:04
4.	"Young Pilgrims" (acoustic version)	3:01

== Personnel ==
The Shins

- James Mercer – vocals, guitars, additional drums (track 1), glockenspiel (track 3), lap steel guitar and percussion (track 5)
- Greg Kurstin – keyboards, guitars (tracks 1, 2, 4, 6, 7), bass (tracks 1, 5, 6, 8, 10), piano (tracks 2, 4, 9, 10), organ (tracks 4, 9, 10), percussion (tracks 6, 10), drums (track 8)
- Joe Plummer – drums (tracks 3, 4, 6, 7, 9)
- Ron Lewis – bass (tracks 2, 3, 4, 7, 9)

Additional musicians

- Dave Hernandez – lead guitar (tracks 2, 3, 4)
- Eric D. Johnson – piano (track 3), background vocals (tracks 3, 4), additional keyboards (track 10)
- Janet Weiss – drums (tracks 1, 2, 10)
- Nik Freitas – lead guitar (tracks 6, 7, 9)
- Marty Crandall – additional keyboards (track 5)
- Nathaniel Walcott – trumpet and flugelhorn (track 8)

Recording personnel

- Greg Kurstin – producer, recording
- James Mercer – co-producer
- Jesse Shatkin – additional engineer
- Graeme Gibson – additional engineer
- Rich Costey – mixing
- Brian Lucey – mastering
- Jacob Escobedo – artwork, layout and design

== Charts ==
=== Weekly charts ===
Weekly chart performance for Port of Morrow
Chart (2012)	Peak position
Australian Albums (ARIA)	4
Austrian Albums (Ö3 Austria)	35
Belgian Albums (Ultratop Flanders)	24
Canadian Albums (Billboard)	7
Danish Albums (Hitlisten)	25
Dutch Albums (Album Top 100)	20
French Albums (SNEP)	83
German Albums (Offizielle Top 100)	33
Irish Albums (IRMA)	14
New Zealand Albums (RMNZ)	17
Norwegian Albums (VG-lista)	9
Spanish Albums (Promusicae)	48
Swedish Albums (Sverigetopplistan)	35
Swiss Albums (Schweizer Hitparade)	33
UK Albums (Official Charts)	11
US Billboard 200	3
US Top Alternative Albums (Billboard)	2
US Top Rock Albums (Billboard)	2
US Indie Store Album Sales (Billboard)	1

=== Year-end charts ===
Year-end chart performance for Port of Morrow
Chart (2012)	Position
US Billboard 200	150
US Top Rock Albums (Billboard)	45
