= Australia (The Shins song) =

Single by the Shins

from the album Wincing the Night Away
- Released: 9 April 2007
- Genre: Indie rock
- Length: 3:56
- Label: Sub Pop
- Songwriter: James Mercer
- Producers: James Mercer; Joe Chiccarelli

The Shins singles chronology
"Phantom Limb" (2007)	"Australia" (2007)	"Turn on Me" (2007)

"Australia" is a song by American indie rock band the Shins, and is the second track on their third album, Wincing the Night Away. The song was released as the second single from that album in the United Kingdom on 9 April 2007.

All three versions of the single are currently available on the United Kingdom iTunes. It is one of the songs on the soundtrack of the Xbox 360 game Project Gotham Racing 4 and was also released as downloadable content for the Rock Band video game series initially through the Rock Band Network, then in 2018 as DLC for Rock Band 4.

The lyrics of the song have many interpretations. Despite its name, the song's lyrics do not reference Australia at all.

== Music video ==
The official music video was directed by Matt McCormick. Shot in Vancouver, Washington, it shows the band members arriving at a car dealership. While one of them poses as a customer to distract the salespeople, the others coordinate a theft of the many gas-filled balloons the dealership has affixed to their cars to advertise their merchandise. They are discovered but manage to escape with the balloons in their van while the decoy walks away undisturbed. The group picks up the decoy down the road, before driving the van to a field where they release the balloons and watch them rise into the sky.

== Reception ==
"Australia" was well received by critics. Pitchfork wrote that "'Australia' is a peppy rocker in the spirit of Chutes' best, elevated by a newfound confidence and expressive range in Mercer's voice."

PopMatters wrote: "Still familiar and addictive, the song nevertheless turns the tried and true formula on its ear, coming off slightly like a New Wave dance anthem."

The single entered the UK Singles Chart on 21 April 2007 at #62.

== Track listings ==
- 7"
1. "Australia"
2. "Girl Inform Me" (performed by Jeremy Warmsley)
3. "Caring Is Creepy" (performed by Polytechnic)
- 7"
1. "Australia"
2. "Phantom Limb" (Radio 2 Session)
3. "So Says I" (KCRW Session)
- CD
1. "Australia"
2. "Sleeping Lessons" (The RAC Mix)
3. "Saint Simon" (Radio 2 Live Version)
4. "Girl on the Wing" (KCRW Session)

== Personnel ==
- James Mercer – vocals, guitar, bass, synthesizers, ukulele, banjo, cat piano
- Martin Crandall – organ
- Dave Hernandez – lead guitar
- Jesse Sandoval – drums
