= Wincing the Night Away =

Studio album by The Shins
- Released: January 23, 2007
- Recorded: Mid 2005 – Mid 2006
- Studios: Oregon City, Oregon; Portland, Oregon; Seattle, Washington
- Genres: Indie rock, indie pop, post-punk revival
- Length: 41:47
- Label: Sub Pop
- Producers: James Mercer, Joe Chiccarelli

The Shins chronology
Chutes Too Narrow (2003)	Wincing the Night Away (2007)	Port of Morrow (2012)

Singles from Wincing the Night Away
- 1. "Phantom Limb" Released: November 14, 2006; 2. "Australia" Released: April 9, 2007; 3. "Turn on Me" Released: September 3, 2007; 4. "Sea Legs" Released: December 2, 2007 (UK only)

Wincing the Night Away is the third studio album by the indie rock group The Shins. It was released by Sub Pop Records on January 23, 2007, and is the last album released under The Shins' contract with Sub Pop. The album was recorded in James Mercer's basement studio, Phil Ek's home in Seattle and in Oregon City with the veteran producer Joe Chiccarelli. It was nominated for a Grammy Award for Best Alternative Music Album.

== Writing and recording ==
Chiccareli had become acquainted with Mercer while working with Pink Martini in Portland, Oregon. At the time Mercer was recording the new Shins album on his own and found that it was not going the way he wanted and at the speed he wanted. Frustrated and in need of fresh objective feedback he sought Chiccarelli's advice and suggestions, before the producer eventually became involved in a professional capacity.

The duo did not start the record from scratch; while they started some songs completely anew, they also retained some of the material that Mercer had been recording on his own. According to Chiccarelli in an interview with HitQuarters, they spent around two months working together on the album.

== Title ==
The title is a play on the title of a Sam Cooke song "Twistin' the Night Away". As reported in Rolling Stone magazine, it is a reference to band member James Mercer's "crippling insomnia". "Sleeping Lessons", the title of the first track, also refers to insomnia and was considered as a possible album title.

Before the album's release, Mercer announced Wincing the Night Away as the album title in an August 2006 interview with Billboard.

== Composition ==
Mercer said that the band was "stretching out" on the new album, and that the extended recording period had given them more time to develop their ideas. He hoped to address more of the "human condition" on the third album, even though it is subdermally present in the previous two albums as well. Wincing the Night Away has been described by critics as a more experimental and sonically diverse album than The Shins’ earlier work, incorporating a range of electronic and stylistic influences.

== Prerelease ==
The full track listing was announced by Pitchfork Media on October 16, 2006. The first single, "Phantom Limb", was released on iTunes on November 14, 2006, and reached physical retailers on November 21. The album was made available for online streaming prior to its official release, including on the band's MySpace page. The album was leaked from a promotional copy on October 20, 2006. Sub Pop hired a UK company to track down the source of the leak.

On January 9, 2007, the album was accidentally made available for purchase on iTunes ahead of its scheduled release date, before being removed the following day. The number of purchases during this period is unknown. Sub Pop also released the album on vinyl LP, which included a coupon for a digital MP3 download.

== Release ==
Wincing the Night Away debuted at number 2 on the Billboard 200 chart, selling in excess of 118,000 copies. This is the highest chart position reached by not only The Shins, but the whole Sub Pop label. During the same week, it also appeared as the top album in four other category charts: Top Digital Albums, Top Rock Albums, Tastemakers and Top Independent Albums.

In the album's second week on the Billboard 200, it fell to number eight and sold about 53,000 copies. Like Oh, Inverted World, the album went Gold. As of January 2012 Wincing the Night Away has sold 622,000 copies in United States.

"Turn on Me" is the third single taken from Wincing the Night Away. It was released in the UK on September 3, 2007. The vinyl came with a special code that could be entered on to www.transgressiverecords.co.uk to receive a 'digital record player', a flash music player that streamed the entire track listing from Wincing the Night Away.Users of the digital player could receive updates about upcoming tracks and playback information.

As the fourth and final single taken to promote the album, the band released "Sea Legs" in the United Kingdom on December 2, 2007 as a digital download. The 7" was limited to only 500 copies and came signed by the band. "Strange Powers" is a Magnetic Fields cover.

== Reception ==
Professional ratings
Aggregate scores
Source	Rating
Metacritic	79/100
Review scores
Source	Rating
AllMusic	4/5 stars
The A.V. Club	B+
Entertainment Weekly	B+
The Guardian	3/5 stars
Los Angeles Times	3/4 stars
NME	9/10
Pitchfork	7.0/10
Q	4/5 stars
Rolling Stone	3.5/5 stars
Spin	3.5/5 stars

According to the review aggregator Metacritic, Wincing the Night Away is rated slightly lower on average than its predecessor, Chutes Too Narrow. While fewer in number, the positive reviews provided higher praise than for the band's prior work. For example, the Austin Chronicle said that it "makes both [previous] albums sound like fragmented potential". The New Musical Express stated that the album was "their best yet". More negative reviews came from Dusted magazine, which said "this is music that not only is mature enough to know that it can't change the world, but is content to not try", while Village Voice said, "filler tunes like "Pam Berry" and "Black Wave" are a far cry from the tenacious stuff that made Chutes the subject of lavish hyperbole."

== Track listing ==
All tracks are written by James Mercer.

No.	Title	Length
1.	"Sleeping Lessons"	3:58
2.	"Australia"	3:56
3.	"Pam Berry"	0:56
4.	"Phantom Limb"	4:47
5.	"Sea Legs"	5:22
6.	"Red Rabbits"	4:29
7.	"Turn on Me"	3:41
8.	"Black Wave"	3:19
9.	"Spilt Needles"	3:45
10.	"Girl Sailor"	3:44
11.	"A Comet Appears"	3:49

The Japanese edition of the album contains two additional tracks, "Nothing at All" and "Spilt Needles" (alternate version), both taken from the "Phantom Limb" single. "Nothing at All" was also included on the album when pre-ordered on iTunes.

== Personnel ==
- James Mercer – vocals, guitar, bass guitar, synthesizers, ukulele, banjo, cat piano, percussion, beat and MIDI programming
- Marty Crandall – synthesizers, organ, bass guitar, percussion
- Dave Hernandez – lead guitar
- Jesse Sandoval – drums
- Chris Funk – lap steel guitar on "Red Rabbits" and "A Comet Appears", hammered dulcimer and bouzouki on "A Comet Appears"
- Eric D. Johnson – backing vocals and piano on "Girl Sailor"
- Anita Robinson – backing vocals on "Phantom Limb" and "Turn On Me"
- Paloma Griffin – violin on "Red Rabbits"
- Niels Gallaway – French horn on "A Comet Appears"
- Additional assistance by Jason McGerr, Marisa Kula, Chris Jones, Bob Stark, Brian Lowe, Brian Vibberts, Kendra Lynn, Wes Johnson & Pete Tewes.

=== Production ===
- Produced by James Mercer and Joe Chiccarelli
- Mixed by Joe Chiccarelli
- Additional production on "Australia", "Girl Sailor" and "Phantom Limb" by Phil Ek
- Recorded by Sean Flora, Hiro Ninagawa, Brian Deck and Lars Fox
- Recorded at Supernatural Sound, Oregon City; The Aural Apothecary, Portland; Avast! 2, Seattle
- Mastered by Emily Lazar and Sarah Register at The Lodge, New York City
- Design and illustration by Robert Mercer

== Charts ==
Chart performance for Wincing the Night Away
Chart (2007)	Peak position
Australian Albums (ARIA)	5
Belgian Albums (Ultratop Flanders)	39
Canadian Albums (Billboard)	2
Dutch Albums (Album Top 100)	27
French Albums (SNEP)	62
German Albums (Offizielle Top 100)	44
Irish Albums (IRMA)	8
Italian Albums (FIMI)	90
New Zealand Albums (RMNZ)	21
Norwegian Albums (VG-lista)	8
Swedish Albums (Sverigetopplistan)	17
UK Albums (Official Charts)	16
US Billboard 200	2

== Certifications ==
Region	Certification	Certified units/sales
United Kingdom (BPI)	Gold	100,000^{*}
United States (RIAA)	Platinum	1,000,000^{‡}
^{*} Sales figures based on certification alone.^{‡} Sales+streaming figures based on certification alone.
