= Nature Bears a Vacuum =

EP by The Shins
- Released: 1999
- Genre: Indie rock
- Length: 8:34
- Label: Omnibus Records

The Shins chronology
When You Land Here, It's Time to Return (1997)	Nature Bears a Vacuum (1999)	Oh, Inverted World (2001)

Nature Bears a Vacuum is a 7" EP released by indie rock band The Shins. The EP was released on the Omnibus Records label in 1998. According to one reviewer, the EP is meant to be played at a different speed (33 rpm and 45 rpm) on each side. The title is a reversal of the phrase "Nature abhors a vacuum".

== Track listing ==
1. "Those Bold City Girls" – 2:04
2. "Eating Styes from Elephants' Eyes" – 1:41
3. "We Built a Raft and We Floated" – 2:02
4. "My Seventh Rib" – 2:37
