= New Slang =

Single by The Shins

from the album Oh, Inverted World
- B-side: "Sphagnum Esplanade"
- Released: February 2001
- Genre: Folk; pop; psychedelic rock
- Length: 3:51
- Label: Sub Pop
- Songwriter: James Mercer

The Shins singles chronology
| "When I Goose-Step" (1999) | "New Slang" (2001) | "Know Your Onion!" (2001) |

"New Slang" is a song by American rock band The Shins, released in February 2001 as the lead single from the group's debut studio album, Oh, Inverted World (2001). Written by guitarist and vocalist James Mercer, it concerns his hometown of Albuquerque, New Mexico and his experiences there in his late 20s. The lyrics are fueled with "angst and confusion," as Mercer was finding himself constantly depressed and disconnected from his friends and scene. The song attracted attention from Sub Pop Records, who issued the song as a single in February 2001. The buzz created by the song led to positive press for the group's debut album, Oh, Inverted World.

The song began to be licensed in a variety of media beginning in 2002, including various television programs and a McDonald's advert that aired during the 2002 Winter Olympics. Although the song never charted on any international charts, it became a sensation following its appearance in the film Garden State (2004), where Sam, a character played by Natalie Portman, referred to it as a song that "will change your life." The band saw increased record sales and visibility as a result. Critics were very positive in their assessments of "New Slang", with many calling it one of the best songs from Oh, Inverted World.

The song's music video was directed by Lance Bangs, and features shots filmed in Albuquerque and Portland, Oregon.

== Background ==
It's that end-of-your-20s thing. Before you knew it, my whole life was upside down: I got signed, I quit my job, I moved out of town, the big relationship I'd had for five years ended. All of a sudden my whole life was up in smoke.

— James Mercer on the song's impact

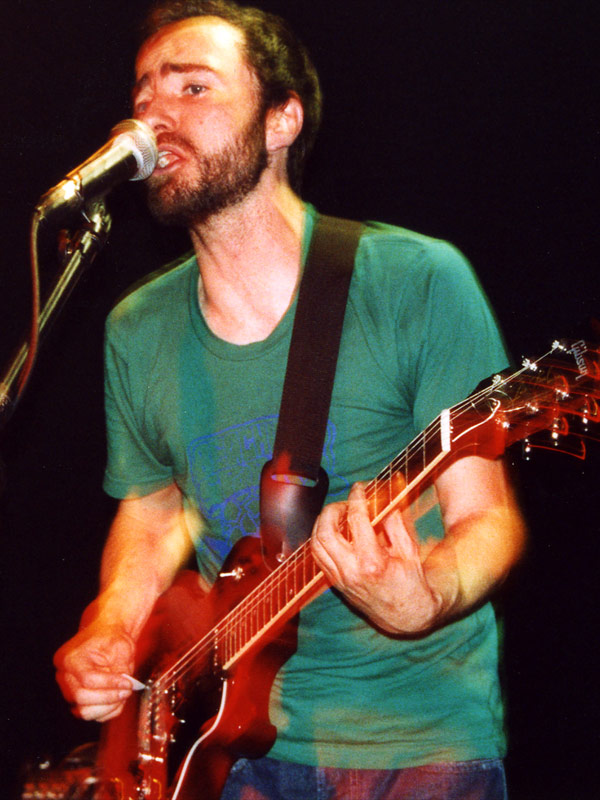
James Mercer in 2004. The song explores his feelings on his hometown of Albuquerque, New Mexico.

The Shins were not truly a band when James Mercer composed the song, and the idea of making music his career seemed uncertain. The song's creation was partially a reaction to the music scene in Albuquerque, New Mexico, the band's hometown, which Mercer described as "macho, really heavy, and aggressive." He characterized it as a punk rock-esque move akin to giving the finger to the entire town. The song was born out of frustration regarding his personal life and future. "It's definitely a moment in my life, that sort of angst and confusion about what my future was going to be," he remarked. He described it as a "Saturn return" period of his life, in which he felt he could not relate to anyone in his hometown and his life there had become depressing. He had become a "hermit" working on the band's debut album, Oh, Inverted World, and had lost interest in partying with friends. The line "Gold teeth and a curse for this town" refers to his songwriting talent and his feelings on Albuquerque.

Friends of the band, including Zeke Howard from Love As Laughter and Isaac Brock from Modest Mouse sent record labels cassette demos of the band's songs, including "New Slang". Mercer sent a demo to Sub Pop Records in Seattle, Washington, and label co-founder Jonathan Poneman caught a concert in San Francisco while the band was on tour with Modest Mouse. He offered the band a one-off single deal, and the label included it in their Single-of-the-Month series, issuing a 7" single to fan club members in February 2001. Positive press for "New Slang" made the group's debut, Oh, Inverted World, one of the most anticipated indie rock albums of 2001, and Sub Pop signed the band in full.

== Reception ==
=== Critical reception ===
"New Slang" received positive critical reception. Stewart Mason of the Weekly Alibi in the band's hometown of Albuquerque called it "the most immediately appealing song on the album," praising it as "simply brilliant, [...] mostly acoustic ballad with the absolute finest melody the band has yet concocted and Mercer's typically oblique but evocative lyrics."

AllMusic called the song a "mid-tempo, strummy folk tune with a real catch-on falsetto melody," giving its 7" single a four-star review, summarizing that the release "could be a lost single from a brilliant, obscure '60s psych-folk band while still sounding far ahead of its time." Rolling Stone ranked it the "most affecting" song from Oh, Inverted World, describing it as "a shuffling folk ballad with a spaghetti-western feel and a somber melody that could have come off an Elliott Smith album." Pitchfork panned the song, deeming it an imitation of Simon & Garfunkel. The New York Times also covered the song, noting that "It has an odd, slightly serpentine vocal melody (it sounds a bit like an adapted madrigal), and the lyrics are absurd and somehow touching."

The A.V. Club called "New Slang" one of the year's "loveliest ballads." Will Hermes, in a piece on NPR's All Things Considered, called the song a "masterpiece," as well as "ridiculously melodic and structurally flawless." Pitchfork later included the song at number 62 on its list of "The Top 500 Tracks of the 2000s," calling it "An agoraphobic bedroom-pop gem that shuffled its way onto a stage larger than anyone imagined possible. "New Slang" paved the way for Norah, Nick, Juno, and the many lovely, odd, and grating mainstream/indie pairings to come."

=== Accolades ===
| Publication | Country | Accolade | Year | Rank |
|---|---|---|---|---|
| Triple J | Australia | Triple J Hottest 100 of All Time | 2009 | 72 |
| Pitchfork | United States | The Pitchfork 500: Our Guide to the Greatest Songs from Punk to the Present | 2008 | * |
| Pitchfork | United States | The Top 500 Tracks of the 2000s | 2009 | 62 |
| Rolling Stone | United States | 100 Best Songs of the 2000s | 2011 | 57 |

* denotes an unordered list

== Music video ==
The song's music video was filmed in various locations in Albuquerque and Portland. Among the areas filmed included the Rio Grande, junkyards, and near Mercer's home. The clip was directed by Lance Bangs, an associate of Spike Jonze. It features the band re-enacting the cover art of other bands' albums, including Zen Arcade and New Day Rising by Hüsker Dü, Let It Be by The Replacements, Moon Pix by Cat Power, Double Nickels on the Dime by The Minutemen, Squirrel Bait's first EP, Sonic Youth's Sister and Slint's Spiderland. Shooting in just two cities created logistical problems for album covers originally photographed in cities such as Los Angeles, Minneapolis, and Louisville. For the homage to Double Nickels on the Dime, the band had to track down the exact model of the car featured on the album cover (a Volkswagen Beetle), and Albuquerque happened to have a San Pedro Street, which is featured on a freeway sign on the original cover.

The video was in rotation on M2, Much Music, and on the program 120 Minutes. The clip was also available for download from Sub Pop's website in 2002.

== Commercial performance and usage ==
The song proved to be a "stealth hit," helping Oh, Inverted World move over 100,000 copies within two years, considered remarkable for an independent label; Sub Pop had hoped the record would sell 10,000 copies. The song was also used on an episode of Scrubs, The O.C., The Sopranos, Buffy the Vampire Slayer, the MTV reality series Newlyweds: Nick and Jessica and video game Marvel's Spider-Man 2. Mercer was positive in licensing the song to a variety of media, confirming to The New York Times that he received more money from touring and licensing than record sales.

The song was featured in a McDonald's advert that aired during the 2002 Winter Olympics. Mercer elaborated on the song's inclusion in the ad in an interview: "That whole thing was just an ad agency that McDonald’s hired to do a “hip commercial,” or whatever. So the kid who offered the whole thing up to us was a Shins fan." Online message boards (many on Pitchfork) and fans of the Shins criticized the move as excessively commercialist. The band's hometown alt weekly ran an editorial titled "McShins, New Corporate Suck-ass" in reaction. The ad's aesthetics were criticized for straying from the company's typical upbeat themes, and fans of the band found its inclusion subversive, considering a set of the song's lyrics, which at times refer to "the dirt in your fries." The royalties Mercer earned from the commercial allowed him to purchase a home. In addition, the band used the money to finance a tour and relocate to Portland, Oregon, where they built a basement studio and recorded their second album, Chutes Too Narrow (2003). Mercer nevertheless "recognized the detrimental capacity of linking music with advertising," remarking, "Imagine us playing 'New Slang,' and everyone in the audience going, 'That's the song from the McDonald's commercial — I'm loving it.'"

"New Slang" achieved a new level of cultural significance when it was prominently featured in the film Garden State (2004). In a scene from the film, Sam (portrayed by Natalie Portman) tells Andrew Largeman (played by Zach Braff) that the song "will change your life." The song had previously been featured on the first soundtrack to Braff's television show Scrubs. The film ""changed everything" for the group, leading their first two albums to sell more than twice what they had prior to the film's debut. "Almost overnight, the Shins became indie-rock icons," wrote Robert Levine of Spin. The band extended their tour in support of the song and its popularity. "We saw a change in our audience. By the time we were done touring for Chutes Too Narrow, there was this new interest," said Mercer. "We toured again almost as the soundtrack to that movie, and colleges were all of a sudden interested in us playing on their campuses. We wanted to consummate the new relationship by touring and having a relationship with them. I mean, it just kept growing!" This additional exposure helped Oh, Inverted World move 500,000 units in the United States.

The band performed the song on their debut appearance at Saturday Night Live in 2007. Mercer was disappointed the show's producers requested he perform a song at that point six years old, but obliged after hearing stories of artists that argued their setlist and were not invited back.

== Formats and track listing ==
7" (2001)

1. "New Slang" – 3:51
2. "Sphagnum Esplanade" - 4:01

CD Promo (2004)

1. "New Slang" – 3:51

== Certifications ==
Certifications for "New Slang"
| Region | Certification | Certified units/sales |
|---|---|---|
| United Kingdom (BPI) | Silver | 200,000^{‡} |
| United States (RIAA) | 2× Platinum | 2,000,000^{‡} |
^{‡} Sales+streaming figures based on certification alone.
