= Phantom Limb (The Shins song) =

Single by The Shins

from the album Wincing the Night Away
- B-side: "Nothing at All"
- Released: 14 November 2006
- Genre: Indie rock
- Length: 4:49
- Label: Sub Pop
- Songwriter: James Mercer
- Producers: James Mercer, Joe Chiccarelli

The Shins singles chronology
"Fighting in a Sack" (2004)	"Phantom Limb" (2006)	"Australia" (2007)

"Phantom Limb" is a song by American indie rock band The Shins, and is the fourth track on their third album Wincing the Night Away. The song was also released as the first single from that album in the United States on November 14, 2006 as a digital download and a week later on CD. On January 22, 2007, "Phantom Limb" was released as a single in the United Kingdom. This song was #75 on Rolling Stone's list of the 100 Best Songs of 2007.

Songwriter and lead singer James Mercer described it as "a hypothetical, fictional account of a young, lesbian couple in high school dealing with the shitty small town they live in."

== Music video ==
The accompanying music video, directed by Patrick Daughters, includes dramatizations of the stories of Joan of Arc, the Spanish conquest of the Aztec Empire and the Donner Party, all played by children and the band themselves.

== Track listing ==
1. "Phantom Limb" - 4:49
2. "Nothing at All" - 4:07
3. "Spilt Needles" (alternate version) - 2:27
4. "Phantom Limb" (video)

The vinyl version of this single features "Nothing at All" and "Spilt Needles" on the flipside as two separate grooves, similar to that of Monty Python's Matching Tie and Handkerchief.

== Charts ==
Upon release, the song reached #42 on the UK Singles Chart. In the United States, the song debuted at #86 on Billboard's Hot 100 chart, becoming the first song by the band to chart in the Hot 100. It was also their first song to appear on Billboard's Alternative Songs chart, peaking there at #16.

== In media ==
The chorus of the song has been used repeatedly as background music to episodes of Australian soap opera Home and Away. It has also been used in the third season of Tell Me Lies. The song is featured in the video game Forza Horizon 6, on the Sub Pop in-game radio station.

== Chart performance ==
Chart (2007)	Peak position
Australian Singles (AMR)	100
Canada Rock (Billboard)	37
UK Singles (Official Charts)	42
US Billboard Hot 100	86
US Adult Alternative Airplay (Billboard)	5
US Alternative Airplay (Billboard)	16
US Pop 100 (Billboard)	87
