= Joe Plummer =

American drummer

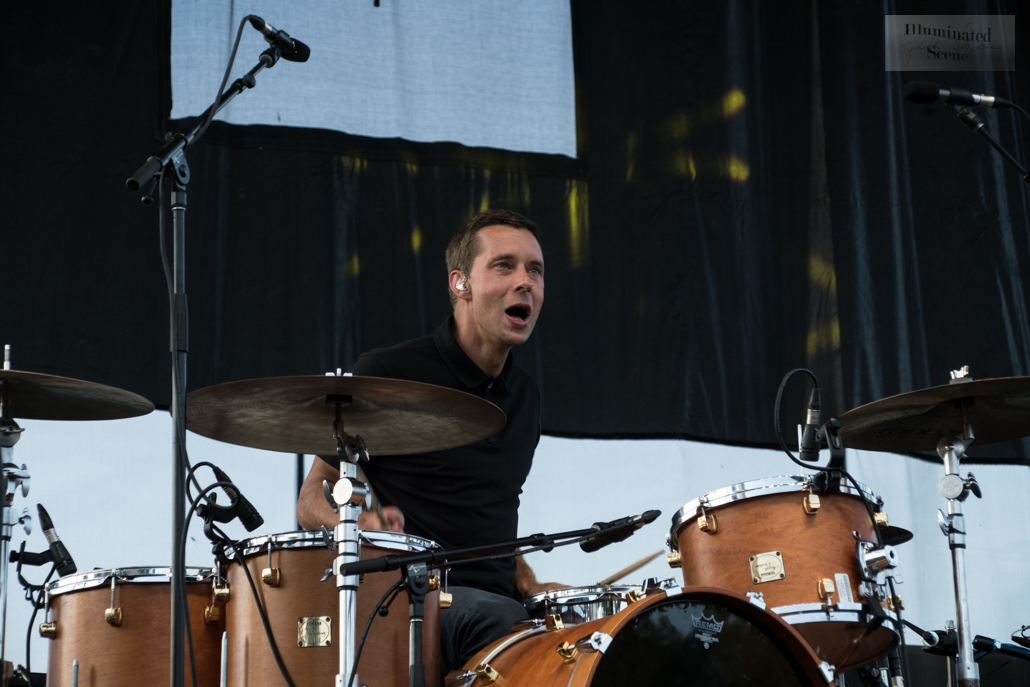
- Plummer on stage with the Cold War Kids at Hinterland Music Festival in 2016

Background information
- Born: February 1, 1973 (age 53); Portland, Oregon, U.S.
- Genres: Indie rock
- Instrument: Drums
- Years active: 1997–present
- Labels: Epic; Touch and Go Records
- Member of: Cold War Kids; The Magic Magicians; Mister Heavenly
- Formerly of: Ugly Casanova; The Black Heart Procession; The Shins; Modest Mouse

Joseph E. Plummer is an American drummer from Portland, Oregon. From 2004 to 2012, Plummer was a percussionist and drummer for the indie rock band Modest Mouse and performed on their album, We Were Dead Before the Ship Even Sank.

Before joining Modest Mouse, Plummer played with the indie rock bands The Black Heart Procession and The Magic Magicians. Plummer was one of the 88 drummers who participated in Japanese noise rock pioneers Boredoms 88 Boadrum performance on August 8, 2008.

In May 2009, Plummer replaced Jesse Sandoval as the drummer for The Shins. He is also a member of Mister Heavenly, a collaboration with Honus Honus of Man Man and Nicholas Thorburn of Islands and The Unicorns, experimenting with a new genre entitled "doom wop".

Plummer also works as a freelance composer. He contributed music for the episodic comedy Antarctic...huh?. An early version premiered at the Museum of Contemporary Art San Diego - La Jolla in 2010.

On November 10, 2013, the Orange County Register announced that Matt Aveiro of Cold War Kids had left the band, and that Plummer would be holding his place indefinitely.

On July 15, 2014, the Cold War Kids released the first single, "All This Could Be Yours" from their fifth album Hold My Home. The release of Hold My Home had Plummer and multi-instrumentalist/singer Matthew Schwartz credited as full members of Cold War Kids on the album's liner notes as opposed to touring members as previously credited.

On August 7, 2015, Plummer's "Built in Sun" EP project with Pall Jenkins and Richard Swift was released.

Plummer announced a new project called The Coromandelles with Matt Maust from Cold War Kids and Daniel Michicoff from Tijuana Panthers.
