= Heartworms (album) =

2017 album by the Shins

Studio album by the Shins
- Released: March 10, 2017
- Recorded: Nov–Dec 2013 ("So Now What"), June 2015 – June 2016
- Genres: Indie pop; indie rock
- Length: 41:44
- Label: Columbia
- Producer: James Mercer

The Shins chronology
Port of Morrow (2012)	Heartworms (2017)	The Worm's Heart (2018)

Singles from Heartworms
- 1. "Dead Alive" Released: October 26, 2016; 2. "Name for You" Released: January 5, 2017; 3. "Half a Million" Released: June 13, 2017; 4. "Cherry Hearts" Released: October 31, 2017

Heartworms is the fifth studio album by American rock band the Shins, released by Columbia Records on March 10, 2017—the band's first studio album in five years. It was produced by James Mercer, with the exception of "So Now What", which was produced by former band member Richard Swift. The album art is based on the Japanese Ukiyo-e triptych Takiyasha the Witch and the Skeleton Spectre.

== Reception ==
Professional ratings
Aggregate scores
Source	Rating
Metacritic	73/100
Review scores
Source	Rating
AllMusic	3.5/5 stars
The A.V. Club	B
Drowned In Sound	8/10
Entertainment Weekly	B+
The Independent	4/5 stars
MusicOMH	4/5 stars
NME	4/5 stars
Paste	7.1/10
Pitchfork	7.6/10
Rolling Stone	3.5/5 stars

Overall, Heartworms received positive reviews from critics. On Metacritic, which assigns a normalized rating out of 100 to reviews from mainstream publications, it has an average score of 73, based on twenty reviews.

=== Accolades ===
Publication	Accolade	Year	Rank	Ref.
Drowned in Sound	Favourite Albums of 2017	2017	77	

== Track listing ==
All tracks are written by James Mercer.

No.	Title	Length
1.	"Name for You"	3:09
2.	"Painting a Hole"	4:44
3.	"Cherry Hearts"	3:33
4.	"Fantasy Island"	4:46
5.	"Mildenhall"	3:19
6.	"Rubber Ballz"	3:17
7.	"Half a Million"	3:23
8.	"Dead Alive"	3:34
9.	"Heartworms"	2:56
10.	"So Now What"	3:38
11.	"The Fear"	5:25

== Personnel ==
Credits are adapted from the album's liner notes.

The Shins

- James Mercer – vocals, guitar (all tracks); bass (1, 2, 7–9, 11), synthesizers (3, 4, 6, 7), percussion (5, 8), chord organ (5, 11), ukulele, harmonica (11)
- Joe Plummer – drums (1, 4, 6–10)
- Yuuki Matthews – synthesizers (1–9, 11), drums (3), percussion (3, 5, 6), bass (4, 6, 10)
- Mark Watrous – guitar (1, 4, 8), piano (1, 8, 9), strings (4, 11), kalimba (4), bass synth (5), castanets (6)
- Jon Sortland – drums (2)
- Richard Swift – synthesizers, Mellotron (4, 6, 10); drums (4), percussion (4, 10)

Additional musicians

- Chris Funk – guitar, dulcimer (2); baritone guitar (11)
- Steve Drizos – percussion (2)

Technical

- James Mercer – production (1–9, 11)
- Richard Swift – production (10)
- Yuuki Matthews – mixing
- Brian Lucey – mastering
- Jacob Escobedo – artwork, design

== Charts ==
Chart (2017)	Peak position
Australian Albums (ARIA)	16
Austrian Albums (Ö3 Austria)	52
Belgian Albums (Ultratop Flanders)	60
Canadian Albums (Billboard)	36
Dutch Albums (Album Top 100)	26
French Albums (SNEP)	157
German Albums (Offizielle Top 100)	61
Irish Albums (IRMA)	18
New Zealand Heatseeker Albums (RMNZ)	2
Portuguese Albums (AFP)	35
Scottish Albums (Official Charts)	16
Sweden Vinyl Albums (Sverigetopplistan)	10
Swiss Albums (Schweizer Hitparade)	44
UK Albums (Official Charts)	19
US Billboard 200	20

== The Worm's Heart ==
The Worm's Heart

Remix album by the Shins
- Released: January 19, 2018
- Recorded: October 2016
- Genres: Indie pop; indie rock
- Length: 41:26
- Label: Columbia
- Producers: Yuuki Matthews, Jon Sortland, James Mercer

The Shins chronology
Heartworms (2017)	The Worm's Heart (2018)

In December 2017, the band announced that a "flipped" version of Heartworms would be released on January 19, 2018. Titled The Worm's Heart, the follow-up album contains the same songs as Heartworms, but reinterpreted and presented in reverse-order. According to Mercer, slow songs were played faster, quiet songs louder, and vice versa.

=== Track listing ===
All tracks are written by James Mercer.

No.	Title	Length
1.	"The Fear (Flipped)"	4:41
2.	"So Now What (Flipped)"	4:18
3.	"Heartworms (Flipped)"	3:09
4.	"Dead Alive (Flipped)"	4:34
5.	"Half a Million (Flipped)"	3:27
6.	"Rubber Ballz (Flipped)"	3:30
7.	"Mildenhall (Flipped)"	4:17
8.	"Fantasy Island (Flipped)"	3:27
9.	"Cherry Hearts (Flipped)"	2:52
10.	"Painting a Hole (Flipped)"	3:10
11.	"Name for You (Flipped)"	4:01

=== Charts ===
Chart (2018)	Peak position
New Zealand Heatseeker Albums (RMNZ)	10
