= Spork EP =

EP by Flake Music
- Released: 1995
- Recorded: ??
- Genre: Indie rock
- Label: Science Project Records

Flake Music chronology
Spork EP (1995)	When You Land Here, It's Time to Return (1997)

Professional ratings
Review scores
Source	Rating
Crawdaddy!	favorable link

Spork EP is an EP released by indie rock band Flake Music.

== Track listing ==
1. "Pull Out of Your Head Size" – 4:30
2. "Dying Lack of Spit" – 4:19
3. "Totto" – 3:24
4. "Nuevo" – 4:03
5. "Dilly Dally" – 3:36
6. "6." – 4:19
