= So Says I =

Single by The Shins

from the album Chutes Too Narrow
- Released: September 23, 2003
- Genre: Indie rock, indie folk
- Length: 2:47
- Label: Sub Pop
- Songwriter: James Mercer

The Shins singles chronology
"Know Your Onion!" (2001)	"So Says I" (2003)	"Fighting in a Sack" (2004)

"So Says I" is a song by American indie rock band The Shins, the third track of their second album Chutes Too Narrow. It was released as a single on September 23, 2003 on Sub Pop Records.

The song was written by the band's lead singer, James Mercer. His lyrics reference and compare life under communist and capitalist economic systems.

This song is performed by The Shins live in the Gilmore Girls season four episode, "Girls in Bikinis, Boys Doin' The Twist."

It remains a fan favorite and is often performed as a set closer at their live shows.

== Music video ==
The music video was directed and animated by Plates Animation Inc. It starts with a 'prehistoric' penguin extracting a tooth from a walrus (the tooth is symbolic throughout the video, as a metaphor to materialism). The penguins are divided into Communist and capitalist roles as the video progresses. The 'Red' penguins are in upheaval (similar to actual historic events). Ominously, the 'Red' penguin leaders are moving strategic assets in a war room, focusing their attention to the West.

The 'Capitalist' penguins (with ties) are oblivious to the world outside their lives. A derelict penguin (sans tie) is begging for spare fish. One penguin finally shows pity and gives a walrus tooth to the homeless penguin. The video closes out with a protest (which mirrors an earlier protest by Red Penguins). Both sets of protesters ironically want the same thing, as many of the signs for both have the same message ("Let us Fly" and "Free the Penguin").

== Single track listing ==
1. "So Says I" - (2:47)
2. "Mild Child" - (4:28)
3. "Gone for Good (alternate version)" - (3:07)
