= Holidays Rule =

Compilation album by Various Artists
- Released: October 30, 2012
- Recorded: 2012
- Genre: Indie rock
- Label: Hear Music / Concord Music Group
- Producers: Sara Matarazzo, Chris Funk

Holidays Rule is a collection of holiday music featuring various artists that range from indie rock to jazz and pop, including Paul McCartney, Rufus Wainwright, and the Shins. The songs on the compilation are both traditional and modern. The album was released by Hear Music/Concord Music Group on October 30, 2012 in North America. Chris Funk of the Decemberists served as the album's producer, and he also appears on the album with Black Prairie. It peaked at number 42 on the December 2012 Billboard 200 album chart.

== Track listing ==
No.	Title	Performer	Length
1.	"Sleigh Ride"	fun.	3:38
2.	"Wonderful Christmastime"	The Shins	2:25
3.	"Baby, It's Cold Outside"	Rufus Wainwright and Sharon Van Etten	4:15
4.	"The Christmas Song (Chestnuts Roasting On An Open Fire)"	Paul McCartney	3:55
5.	"(Everybody's Waitin' for) The Man with the Bag"	Black Prairie featuring Sallie Ford	3:34
6.	"I Heard the Bells on Christmas Day"	The Civil Wars	2:35
7.	"Green Grows the Holly"	Calexico	4:07
8.	"We Need A Little Christmas"	AgesandAges	3:16
9.	"That's What I Want for Christmas"	Holly Golightly	2:28
10.	"May Ev'ry Day be Christmas"	Irma Thomas with Preservation Hall Jazz Band	2:32
11.	"Blue Christmas"	Heartless Bastards	2:10
12.	"Santa, Bring My Baby Back to Me"	Eleanor Friedberger	5:29
13.	"It's Beginning to Look Like Christmas"	Fruit Bats	3:02
14.	"Señor Santa"	Y La Bamba	3:10
15.	"O come, O come, Emmanuel"	Punch Brothers	4:06
16.	"What Are You Doing New Year's Eve?"	The Head and the Heart	4:30
17.	"Auld Lang Syne"	Andrew Bird	4:31

== Versions ==
Holidays Rule was released in the UK on 26 November 2012 with the name Christmas Rules.

Following the success of Holidays Rule, 16 new songs were released on 13 October 2017 as Holidays Rule Vol. 2.
