= Scared of Chaka =

- Origin: Albuquerque, New Mexico, U.S.
- Genres: Garage punk, pop punk
- Years active: 1993–2001, 2008 (reunion)
- Labels: 702 Records; Empty Records; Hopeless Records

Scared of Chaka is an American punk rock band based in Albuquerque, New Mexico, that was formed in 1993 by guitarist/vocalist David Yanul Hernandez, bass guitarist Dameon Waggoner and drummer Jeff Jones. Jones was later replaced by Ron Skrasek. The band played a Dickies-inspired mix of garage and pop-punk, following in the footsteps of local Albuquerque act the Drags.

The band released a number of full lengths, 7-inch EPs, and split records throughout its career for labels including 702 Records, Empty Records, Dirtnap Records and Hopeless spin off Sub City Records. Following the 2001 release of Crossing with Switchblades, the band dissolved. The band played a number of reunion shows in 2008, including Music Fest NW in Portland, Oregon, and FunFunFunFest in Austin, Texas. On September 20, 2008, they performed with Dillinger Four as part of the inaugural year of Forward Music Fest in Madison, Wisconsin. In 2024, the band released the single "Bated Breath", their first recording in more than twenty years, along with a live performance on KEXP.

== Legacy ==
Following the breakup of Scared of Chaka, Hernandez formed Broadcast Oblivion in 2002 with Coady Willis (of Murder City Devils, Dead Low Tide and Big Business) and Andrew Church (of The Droo Church and Supersuckers).

Hernandez had previously performed in projects with James Mercer, who went on to form the popular indie rock act The Shins (Scared of Chaka also released a split 7-inch with the pre-Shins act Flake Music). The original line-up of The Shins featured Hernandez on bass guitar. After a year, however, he left the band to pursue a personal relationship in New York. In 2003, when Shins bass guitarist Neal Langford left the group, Hernandez re-joined the Shins as a bass guitarist. He currently lives in Seattle. Skrasek lives in Portland, Oregon, and Waggoner lives in Los Angeles.

Scared of Chaka's music was influential in the U.S. garage / punk rock scene. Current bands which have continued similar musical threads, such as the Riverboat Gamblers, and The Robits from Milwaukee, WI have cited Scared of Chaka as an influence.

== Discography ==
=== Main albums ===
- Hutch Brown Sayngwich (702, 1995) - LP
- Scared of Chaka (702) - LP
- Masonic Youth (Empty, 1996) - LP
- How to Lose (702 / Empty, 1998) - EP
- Tired of You (Hopeless / Sub City, 1999) - LP
- Crossing with Switchblades (Hopeless / Sub City, 2001) - LP

=== Collections ===
- Seven Stories Tall: Singles '94-'99 (702) - LP

=== Singles/EPs and splits ===
- Scared of Chaka / The Gain - split 7-inch (702 Records) - EP
- Scared of Chaka / Flake Music - split 7-inch (702 Records / Science Project) - EP
- Scared of Chaka / Fatal Flyin' Guilloteens - split 7-inch (Dirtnap Records)
- Scared Of Chaka / Real Swinger - split 7-inch (Ballroom Blitz Records)
- Scared of Chaka / The Traitors - split 7-inch (Johanns Face Records)
- "live at Jay's" (Bad Man Records, 2002) - 7-inch EP - ltd 200 - white marble vinyl
- Scared of Chaka / Word Salad - split 7-inch (Science Project)
- Scared of Chaka "Automatic" 7-inch (eMpTy)
- Scared of Chaka "Bated Breath" b/w "Nobody" (Slovenly Recordings)
