= When You Land Here, It's Time to Return =

Studio album by Flake Music
- Released: 1997
- Recorded: Spring 1997
- Genres: Indie rock, indie pop
- Length: 31:36
- Label: Omnibus
- Producer: Kennie Takahashi (reissue)

The Shins chronology
Spork EP (1995)	When You Land Here, It's Time to Return (1997)	Oh, Inverted World (2001)

Alternative cover
- 2014 remastered edition

Professional ratings
Review scores
Source	Rating
AllMusic	4/5 stars
Pitchfork	7.0/10

When You Land Here, It's Time to Return is a full-length album released by indie rock band Flake Music before changing their name to The Shins. The album was recorded in 1997 and was released on Omnibus Records.

In a May 2009 interview with Pitchfork, frontman James Mercer announced plans to re-release the album on his own record label, Aural Apothecary. The new version of the album was mixed by Danger Mouse's sound engineer Kentoro Takahashi. The reissue was released on CD and vinyl on November 24, 2014 in Europe and on November 25, 2014 in North America.

== Track listing ==
No.	Title	Length
1.	"Spanway Hits"	2:28
2.	"Blast Valve"	2:56
3.	"Roziere"	1:23
4.	"Structo"	3:42
5.	"Candy Dish of Diamonds"	0:51
6.	"Deluca"	4:06
7.	"Mieke"	2:51
8.	"On the Playground in the Wind"	2:12
9.	"The Shins"	3:17
10.	"Faded Polaroids"	2:34
11.	"Vantage"	5:15
Total length:		31:35

- Before the 2014 reissue, the three longest titles, tracks 5, 8, and 10, were unknown and not listed on any official release of the album. They were typically left blank or listed as "untitled".

== Personnel ==
Credits are adapted from the remastered album's liner notes.

Personnel

- Del Winiecki – engineering, mixing
- Nick Noeding Jr. – engineering (10)
- Flake Music – mixing
- Kentoro Takahashi – mixing (reissue)
- JJ Golden – mastering

Artwork

- Flake Music – art direction
- Jeff Kleinsmith – art direction, design
- Kieth Negley – painting
- Kendall Taylor – photography
- Neal Langford – sleeve
