= Oh, Inverted World =

Studio album by The Shins
- Released: June 19, 2001
- Recorded: 2000–2001
- Genre: Indie rock; indie pop; post-punk revival; psychedelic pop; folk-pop
- Length: 33:31
- Label: Omnibus; Sub Pop
- Producer: James Mercer, The Shins

The Shins chronology
When You Land Here, It's Time to Return (1997)	Oh, Inverted World (2001)	Chutes Too Narrow (2003)

Singles from Oh, Inverted World
- 1. "New Slang" Released: February 2001; 2. "Know Your Onion!" Released: April 2002

Oh, Inverted World is the debut studio album by American indie rock band The Shins, released on June 19, 2001, to critical acclaim. Omnibus Records put out an initial run of vinyl distributed by Darla. Sub Pop Records reprinted the vinyl, but the Sub Pop logo only appears on later pressings.

The album contains the songs "Caring Is Creepy" and "New Slang", both of which appeared in the 2004 film Garden State and on its soundtrack.

== Background ==
The album was released several months after its lead single, "New Slang", had debuted. The song garnered substantial critical acclaim to the point where label Sub Pop gave the Shins a record deal. The album was thus seen as one of the most anticipated indie releases of 2001. Some of the songs on the album existed in an embryonic form back when front man James Mercer was a member of another older band named Flake Music. The aforementioned band was based more in straight-ahead 90's alternative rock like Superchunk, whereas these nascent Oh, Inverted World songs were more inspired by Elephant 6 bands and oldies radio. This mismatch led to Mercer forming The Shins, in which he could explore this divergent sound.

The song "Know Your Onion!" was based on a saying of Mercer's mother, who would say the idiosyncratic phrase "know your onion!" which referred to having discipline in order to do a job well, with Mercer giving an example by saying "you really gotta know your onion to, I don't know, be an electrician or something." Mercer had said that the song's lyrics are about "getting your shit together and figuring out who are. You know, after high school and all the stupidness of that."

== Reception ==
Professional ratings
Review scores
Source	Rating
AllMusic	5/5 stars
The Austin Chronicle	4/5 stars
The Boston Phoenix	3/4 stars
Drowned in Sound	9/10
The Guardian	4/5 stars
NME	8/10
Pitchfork	8.0/10
Q	3/5 stars
Rolling Stone	3.5/5 stars
Under the Radar	9/10

Oh, Inverted World placed at number 35 on the Pazz & Jop critics' poll for best album of 2001. Online music magazine Pitchfork placed Oh, Inverted World at number 115 on their list of top 200 albums of the 2000s.

== Legacy ==
In a 2003 interview published in the San Francisco Foghorn, the official student newspaper of the University of San Francisco, Mercer was asked whether he was happy with the way Oh, Inverted World came out. Mercer responded by saying "As far as how it sounds, no. I don't know, it was okay. I mean, there are a lot of records that sound more perfect, or close to perfect." In a 2021 retrospective interview, Mercer identified closing track "The Past and Pending" as most likely being his favorite song on the album, stating that "it just works on me probably more than the other songs do."

Oh, Inverted World was also the name of a web series created by Terence Krey. Released in November 2010, it was largely inspired by The Shins' music as well as other indie artists such as Arcade Fire and The Decemberists. The 13-part sci-fi web series was a story of four twentysomethings returning home from college to find that the Moon is falling into the Earth. The web series was called by The New York Times a "mumblecore Night of the Living Dead".

Oh, Inverted World was certified platinum, for sales of one million units, by the Recording Industry Association of America in May 2023. It is the third album released by Sub Pop to be certified at that level, after Bleach by Nirvana and Give Up by The Postal Service.

== 20th anniversary reissue ==
The original mastered audio files for both this album as well as its follow-up Chutes Too Narrow, which were stored on an HP Pavilion in Mercer's home, were stolen in 2003. However, this didn't affect the ability to remaster the album because he still had access to the original masters stored on DATs by the mastering company, and only made it impossible to do remixes (save for "New Slang", the relevant file of which was preserved on a DVD Mercer made). In April 2021, a 20th anniversary reissue of Oh, Inverted World was announced for release on June 11, 2021. The reissue was remastered by Bob Ludwig, with The Shins' James Mercer serving as an assistant, and features new artwork, booklet and packaging.

== Track listing ==
All tracks are written by James Mercer.

No.	Title	Length
1.	"Caring Is Creepy"	3:19
2.	"One by One All Day"	4:08
3.	"Weird Divide"	1:57
4.	"Know Your Onion!"	2:28
5.	"Girl Inform Me"	2:19
6.	"New Slang"	3:49
7.	"The Celibate Life"	1:49
8.	"Girl on the Wing"	2:48
9.	"Your Algebra"	2:22
10.	"Pressed in a Book"	2:54
11.	"The Past and Pending"	5:21

Japanese bonus track
No.	Title	Length
12.	"Sphagnum Esplanade"	4:20

== Personnel ==
Credits are adapted from the album's liner notes.

The Shins

- James Mercer – vocals, guitars, keyboards, xylophone, autoharp, programming, harmonium, percussion, harmonica
- Marty Crandall – keyboards
- Neal Langford – bass
- Jesse Sandoval – drums, percussion

Additional musicians

- Melanie Crandall – cello (9)
- Neils Galloway – French horn (11)

Production

- James Mercer – production
- The Shins – production (1, 4, 5, 8, 10)
- John Golden – mastering

Artwork

- Andrea Leah – design

== Charts ==
2012 weekly chart performance for Oh, Inverted World
Chart (2012)	Peak position
US Vinyl Albums (Billboard)	14

2021 weekly chart performance for Oh, Inverted World
Chart (2021)	Peak position
Scottish Albums (OCC)	50
US Billboard 200	168

== Certifications ==
Region	Certification	Certified units/sales
United States (RIAA)	Platinum	1,000,000^{‡}
^{‡} Sales+streaming figures based on certification alone.
