= Wish I Was Here =

2014 American comedy-drama film

- Theatrical release poster
- Directed by: Zach Braff
- Written by: Adam Braff; Zach Braff
- Produced by: Stacey Sher; Michael Shamberg; Zach Braff; Adam Braff
- Starring: Zach Braff; Donald Faison; Josh Gad; Pierce Gagnon; Ashley Greene; Kate Hudson; Joey King; Jim Parsons; Mandy Patinkin
- Cinematography: Lawrence Sher
- Edited by: Myron Kerstein
- Music by: Rob Simonsen
- Production companies: Worldview Entertainment; Double Feature Films
- Distributed by: Focus Features
- Release dates: January 18, 2014 (Sundance Film Festival); July 18, 2014 (United States)
- Running time: 107 minutes
- Country: United States
- Language: English
- Budget: $6 million
- Box office: $6.6 million

Wish I Was Here is a 2014 American comedy-drama film directed by Zach Braff and co-written with his brother Adam Braff. The film stars Zach Braff, Donald Faison, Josh Gad, Pierce Gagnon, Ashley Greene, Kate Hudson, Joey King, Jim Parsons, and Mandy Patinkin. The film had its world premiere at the Sundance Film Festival on January 18, 2014 and was given a limited release on July 18, 2014 by Focus Features. This marked the final film appearances for James Avery and Allan Rich before their deaths on December 31, 2013 and August 22, 2020 respectively.

== Plot ==
Aidan Bloom is a 35-year-old father of two struggling to be an actor in Los Angeles while his wife, Sarah, works a tedious data entry job. In order to send their kids, Grace and Tucker, to a Jewish school, they rely on help from Aidan's father, Gabe, who insisted they go to an Orthodox Jewish day school.

When Gabe reveals his cancer has returned, he tells Aidan that he has decided to put the rest of his money into a new stem cell treatment, meaning his grandchildren can no longer afford to attend their school. After school administrator Rabbi Twersky refuses to provide any aid to the Blooms, Sarah suggests that Aidan homeschool their kids, and their adventure of self-discovery begins. Through teaching them about life his way, Aidan gradually discovers some of the parts of himself he could not find.

Aidan takes the kids on a field trip, camping in the desert. Another day, they are able to test drive an Aston Martin, as Grace is wearing a wig and the salesman mistakenly believes she is dying. Another he works with the kids fixing up their yard, referring to it as Mr. Miyagi learning (referring to The Karate Kid), working to repair the fence and pool. Aidan fools a wealthy neighbor's maid into believing he and the kids are there to clean the pool so he can teach Grace to swim.

Aidan's brother Noah is a virtual shut-in who can only be bribed to babysit for his brother. He also refuses to see his dying father, from whom he is estranged. Noah falls for his neighbor Janine who is a furry costume maker, which gives him the idea to impress her by making a costume for San Diego Comic-Con. He does go, and attracts Janine. As Gabe nears death, he calls to ask Aidan to come, bringing his favorite ice cream and Noah. He surprisingly leaves the convention to join them at Gabe's side.

Aidan grows closer to his wife and children, his faith through the support of young Rabbi Rosenberg, his brother and his father. The family moves onward and upward. Grace happily starts high school. Sarah stands up against her harasser at work, getting one year of severance pay, whereas he receives many hours of obligatory anti-sexual harassment training and is fired. Aidan gets a job as an acting teacher.

== Cast ==
- Zach Braff as Aidan
- Kate Hudson as Sarah
- Donald Faison as Anthony
- Joey King as Grace
- Josh Gad as Noah
- Jim Parsons as Paul
- Pierce Gagnon as Tucker
- Mandy Patinkin as Gabe
- Ashley Greene as Janine
- Michael Weston as Jerry
- Alexander Chaplin as Rabbi Rosenberg
- Allan Rich as Rabbi Twersky
- James Avery as James McGuire

== Production ==
=== Crowdfunding campaign ===
On April 24, 2013, director Zach Braff launched a Kickstarter campaign for his comedy film Wish I Was Here, aiming to make $2 million to boost the project, based on a script he co-wrote with his brother Adam J. Braff. Larry Sher was set as director of photography, and Michael Shamberg and Stacey Sher were set to produce. The campaign raised $2 million 3 days after the project was launched. On May 15, 2013, Worldview Entertainment stepped in to gap finance the project, which at that point had raised over $2.6 million. The campaign ended on May 24, 2013, and raised $3,105,473 from 46,520 people.

At the film's New York premiere, actress Joey King stated that she donated money to the film on Kickstarter before she was even attached as a cast member.

The movie received considerable criticism for its funding model. Over $3 million of the around $5 million budget came from crowdfunding, then Worldview Entertainment stepped in to top up the budget to $5 million. The unconventional funding model meant that crowdfunding supporters were promised 'bonuses' for their pledges, yet film financier Worldview Entertainment stood to make a financial return on its investment. Braff has stated that he believes the negativity regarding the movie's crowdfunding campaign contributed to the movie's box office failure.

=== Casting ===
At the time the Kickstarter was launched, Zach Braff and Jim Parsons had already been cast. Braff plays Aidan Bloom, a struggling actor, husband and father trying to find his purpose. On May 14, 2013, Mandy Patinkin joined the cast, playing Gabe Bloom, Aidan's father. Josh Gad also joined the cast to play the role of Aidan's brother. On May 15, Anna Kendrick signed on to play Janine, a young woman who is into cosplay. Kate Hudson joined on May 20 to play Sarah Bloom, Aidan's wife. Joey King was set to play Grace Bloom, the 12-year-old daughter of Aidan and Sarah Bloom, on July 2, 2013. Pierce Gagnon was added to the cast on July 9, to play Tucker Bloom, son of Aidan and Sarah. On July 17, it was announced that Ashley Greene would replace Anna Kendrick as Janine.

=== Filming ===
Principal photography took 25 days, beginning on August 5, 2013 in Los Angeles and ending on September 6, 2013.

== Release ==
The film's first trailer was released on April 9, 2014.

The film had its world premiere at the 2014 Sundance Film Festival in January 2014, 10 years after the premiere of Braff's directorial debut Garden State. Focus Features bought distribution rights to the film in North America, Poland, and South Africa for $2.75 million after a bidding war with the Weinstein Company, Fox Searchlight Pictures, Lionsgate, and CBS Films.

After its opening at Sundance, it was announced that the film would open on July 18, 2014, exclusively in New York and Los Angeles. The release ended up a bit wider, playing in 68 theaters during its opening weekend. The release then expanded on July 25. The special preview screening in London was attended by Kate Hudson and Zach Braff on September 18, 2014.

=== Critical reception ===
Wish I Was Here received mixed reviews from critics. On Rotten Tomatoes, the film has an approval of 45%, based on 132 reviews, with the site's consensus reading: "There's no denying Wish I Was Here is heartfelt, but it covers narrative ground that's already been well trod – particularly by director Zach Braff's previous features." On Metacritic the film has a score of 43 out of 100, based on 34 critics, indicating "mixed or average reviews".

The box office failure of the movie, attributed to negative publicity surrounding the movie's crowdfunding campaign, has meant that it is the only high-profile film, as of 2022, to have used the crowdfunding model.

=== Home media ===
Wish I Was Here was released on DVD and Blu-ray on October 28, 2014.

== Soundtrack ==
The soundtrack for the film includes an original song by The Shins, an original song by Bon Iver, and an original title track by Coldplay, recorded with Cat Power.
