= Garden State (film) =

2004 American film by Zach Braff

- Theatrical release poster
- Directed by: Zach Braff
- Written by: Zach Braff
- Produced by: Gary Gilbert; Dan Halsted; Pamela Abdy; Richard Klubeck
- Starring: Zach Braff; Natalie Portman; Ian Holm; Peter Sarsgaard
- Cinematography: Lawrence Sher
- Edited by: Myron I. Kerstein
- Music by: Alexi Murdoch; Chad Fischer
- Production companies: Camelot Pictures; Jersey Films; Double Feature Films
- Distributed by: Fox Searchlight Pictures (United States, Canada and Asia); Miramax International (International; through Buena Vista International)
- Release dates: January 16, 2004 (Sundance); July 28, 2004 (United States)
- Running time: 102 minutes
- Country: United States
- Language: English
- Budget: $2.5 million
- Box office: $35.8 million

Garden State is a 2004 American romantic comedy drama film, written and directed by Zach Braff, and starring him, Natalie Portman, Peter Sarsgaard and Ian Holm. The film centers on Andrew Largeman (Braff), a 26-year-old actor/waiter who returns to his hometown in New Jersey after his mother dies. Braff based the film on his real life experiences. It was filmed in April and May 2003 and released on July 28, 2004. New Jersey was the main setting and primary shooting location.

Garden State received positive reviews and was a box office success. It was an official selection of the Sundance Film Festival. The film's soundtrack, selected by Braff, won a Grammy Award for Best Compilation Soundtrack Album for a Motion Picture, Television or Other Visual Media.

== Plot ==
Struggling actor Andrew Largeman wakes up from a dream—in which he apathetically sits on a crashing plane—to a telephone message from his father, telling Andrew that he needs to return home because his mother has died.

Andrew leaves Los Angeles and returns home to New Jersey to attend the funeral. He recognizes the grave-diggers as old friends Mark and Dave, who invite him to a party that night. At home, Andrew's father gets him a doctor's appointment for headaches that he has been having.

Later that night, Andrew goes to the party where he meets up with Mark, Dave, and Jesse, an old friend who has just earned a fortune after creating silent Velcro. After smoking marijuana and taking ecstasy at the party, he still remains detached.

The morning after the party, Andrew proceeds to the appointment. In the waiting room, he meets a young woman named Sam, who is a pathological liar. She later explains that most times she does not know why she lies and will always admit to them afterward. In Andrew's meeting with his doctor, it is revealed that Andrew has been on lithium and other mood stabilizers, as well as antidepressants, since the age of 10, but has recently stopped taking them. He also says that his father, who is his psychiatrist, put him on the medications. Andrew finds Sam outside the office and offers her a ride home. Sam invites him into her house, where he meets her mother, who inadvertently reveals that Sam has epilepsy. Andrew tells Sam of his mother's death, and Sam tearfully eulogizes her hamster. After returning home, Andrew's father confronts him and is insistent that they have a talk before Andrew leaves.

Later, Andrew and Jesse sit in the cemetery as Mark digs another grave. Andrew observes Mark stealing jewelry from the corpse he is burying. Andrew then returns to Sam's house, and the two spend the rest of the day together, joining his friends later at Jesse's mansion. Andrew tells Sam that he pushed his mother in frustration when he was nine years old, knocking her over a broken dishwasher and leaving her paraplegic; he says that his father blames him for his mother's paralysis and put him on medication to "curb the anger" he supposedly harbors. Sam listens, and Andrew admits his feelings for her.

The next day, Mark tells Andrew that he needs help "tracking down" a going-away present for him. Sam, Andrew, and Mark spend the day together, ending it in a quarry in Newark where Mark talks to a man named Albert, who is employed in keeping intruders out of the quarry. The three discuss the reasons why Albert and his wife choose to live in the quarry. Albert explains that living there and exploring the quarry is "doing something that's completely unique, that's never been done before", mirroring an earlier speech by Sam. Finally, Albert explains that what actually matters is living with his family. Andrew is inspired by the conversation, and outside in the rain, he climbs atop a derelict crane and screams into the quarry, joined by Sam and Mark. He and Sam then share a kiss.

When Sam and Andrew look at the gift later on, it turns out to be Andrew's mother's favorite pendant, one of the items Mark stole from her grave, sold, and subsequently located. Andrew eventually talks with his father, and states that he was not to blame for his mother's accident and that he will live the rest of his life without medication. He forgives his father and says he wants to build a better relationship with him.

The morning after, Andrew says his goodbyes to Sam at the airport while she begs him not to leave. He acknowledges that she has changed his life but also recognizes that he still has to fix his personal problems before continuing the relationship. Andrew boards the flight, and Sam is left crying in a telephone booth. Andrew, changing his mind, returns to Sam and says he does not want to waste any more of his life without her. He wonders what to do next, and the two then kiss.

== Cast ==
- Zach Braff as Andrew Largeman, a depressed, heavily medicated, struggling young actor who waits tables in a Vietnamese restaurant. When he was nine years old, he accidentally paralyzed his mother by pushing her over a dishwasher door. He has not cried or felt any significant emotions for several years, mainly as a result of the medication he has been supplied with by his estranged father.
- Natalie Portman as Samantha "Sam", an eccentric epileptic and compulsive liar, who openly admits to her casual dishonesty and frequently ponders what makes her do it. She says she works at a law office as a paralegal, and lives with her equally peculiar mother and her adopted African sibling, Titembay.
- Peter Sarsgaard as Mark, an old school friend of Andrew, now working as a grave-digger. He still lives with his mother and smokes marijuana, frequently attending wild parties; he also makes money by stealing jewelry from the people he buries and exploiting loopholes in store return policies.
- Ian Holm as Gideon Largeman, Andrew's father and psychiatrist, whose passive demeanor hides deep-seated grief that his family has not been "happy". He still thinks Andrew's anger is responsible for his late wife's paralysis and has tried to use lithium and other medications to "control" Andrew's emotions in a futile attempt to bring happiness to his family.
- Jean Smart as Carol, Mark's mother, a recovering alcoholic, who sees a wealth of potential in her son.
- Armando Riesco as Jesse, another school friend of Mark and Andrew who has made a fortune and bought a mansion with money he has earned from inventing a silent alternative to Velcro fabric.
- Jackie Hoffman as Sylvia Largeman: Andrew's aunt, who sings the Commodores's "Three Times a Lady" at her sister-in-law's funeral.
- Method Man as Diego, a bellhop at a luxury hotel who hosts peeping sessions of various hotel rooms.
- Alex Burns as Dave, another old school friend who now works as a grave-digger with Mark.
- Ron Leibman as Dr. Cohen, a neurologist whom Andrew visits at the beginning of the film.
- Denis O'Hare in a cameo appearance as Albert, one of the "guardians of the abyss".
- Jim Parsons as Tim, an old acquaintance of Mark and Andrew, and the boyfriend of Mark's mother, who works as a knight at Medieval Times.
- Michael Weston as Kenny the Cop, a former classmate of Andrew's from high school; he is now employed as a police officer in their New Jersey neighborhood.
- Ann Dowd as Olivia, Sam's mother.
- Ato Essandoh as Titembay, Sam's adopted brother.
- Geoffrey Arend as Karl Benson, another former high-school classmate of Andrew's; works at Handi-World.

== Production ==
Garden State was Braff's feature directing and writing debut. The title of the film was originally intended to be Large's Ark, in reference to Braff's character (note that Albert mentions his own ark in the movie), but he changed it because no one understood what it meant. The title alludes both to the nickname for New Jersey, and lines from Andrew Marvell's poem "The Garden" ("Such was that happy garden-state/While man there walked without a mate").

Garden State was filmed over 25 days in April and May 2003, with a budget of $2.5 million; according to Zach Braff, this was down from $6 million, suggested by Gary Gilbert, a co-founder of Rocket Mortgage and first-time film producer, so that he could produce the entire film himself. Most of the film was shot on location in Braff's hometown of South Orange, New Jersey, with filming also taking place at Cranford, Livingston, Maplewood, Newark, Tenafly, Mahwah, and Wallington as well as New York City and Los Angeles.

Braff has cited such films as Harold and Maude, Woody Allen films (specifically Annie Hall and Manhattan), and the films of Alexander Payne as influences on Garden State.

== Music ==
The music that accompanied the film was hand-picked by Braff. Commenting on the selections, he said that "Essentially, I made a mix CD with all of the music that I felt was scoring my life at the time I was writing the screenplay."

Braff won a Grammy Award in 2005 for Best Compilation Soundtrack Album for a Motion Picture, Television or Other Visual Media at the 47th Annual Grammy Awards. The film's trailer won an award for Best Music at the Golden Trailer Awards. The Broadcast Film Critics Association nominated it for Best Soundtrack at the 10th Critics' Choice Awards.

== Themes ==
The protagonist's father has been "protecting" him from his own feelings with pills, namely lithium carbonate. Braff describes the themes of the movie as "love, for lack of a better term. And it's a movie about awakening. It's a movie about taking action. It's a movie about how life is short, go for it now. My character says, 'I'm 26 years old, and I've spent my whole life waiting for something else to start.' Now I realize that this is all there is, and I'm going to try to live my life like that." In another interview, he said: "I have this theory that your body goes through puberty in its teens, and the mind goes through puberty in your twenties ... [Andrew] is dealing with issues that you are going through all the time going into your thirties. He's lost and lonesome, which is something I definitely felt in my twenties."

The film is partly autobiographical, depicting Braff's own emotions while he was writing the screenplay. He described that "When I wrote Garden State, I was completely depressed, waiting tables and lonesome as I've ever been in my life. The script was a way for me to articulate what I was feeling; alone, isolated, 'a dime a dozen' and homesick for a place that didn't even exist."

== Release ==
The film was first screened on January 16, 2004, at the Sundance Film Festival where it was purchased in a joint venture by Fox Searchlight Pictures and Miramax for $5 million, double the film's budget. Fox Searchlight Pictures president Peter Rice said of the film, "Having enjoyed the film immensely, we look forward to working with Miramax to bring Garden State to audiences worldwide."

From March until mid July, it screened at other film festivals until it received a limited release on July 28 in North America, expanding over the following weeks to wider release domestically and in over 20 countries. It became only the fourth non-documentary feature to top the chart that year, as calculated by per screen average, since Memorial Day weekend.

Stephen Gilula, president of distribution at Fox Searchlight, attributed the film's gradual success to word of mouth and a publicity tour by Braff leading up to the film's theatrical debut. Gilula said, "Zach [Braff] had a cross-country tour, and we [organized] word of mouth screenings, where we had to turn people away. Zach did Q&As following [the screenings]."

== Reception ==
=== Box office ===
Garden State grossed $26.8 million domestically (United States and Canada), and $9.0 million in other territories, for a worldwide total of $35.8 million, against a budget of $2.5 million. After a limited theatrical release (less than 40 theatres over its first three weeks), it went into wide release in its fifth week, when it also reached the Top 10 at the domestic box office for the first of two non-consecutive weeks.

=== Critical response ===
On the review aggregator website Rotten Tomatoes, 86% of 191 critics' reviews are positive, with an average rating of 7.5/10. The website's consensus reads: "Delivering a quirky spin on familiar twentysomething tropes – with a cannily-placed soundtrack – Garden State has enough charm to mark a winning debut for first-time director Zach Braff." Metacritic, which uses a weighted average, assigned the film a score of 67 out of 100, based on 37 critics, indicating "generally favorable" reviews.

Peter Debruge of Premiere wrote: "Garden State gets it. Not since The Graduate has a movie nailed the beautiful terror of standing on the brink of adulthood with such satisfying precision." Roger Ebert of the Chicago Sun-Times gave the film three out of four stars and wrote: "This is not a perfect movie; it meanders and ambles and makes puzzling detours. But it's smart and unconventional, with a good eye for the perfect detail."

Some reviews were more mixed. Todd McCarthy of Variety said the film "feels too piecemeal and ultimately inconsequential." Keith Phipps of The A.V. Club wrote: "Garden State coasts on this considerable charm until it hits a brick wall in its final segments".

=== Manic Pixie Dream Girl ===
Natalie Portman's character Sam has been used as an example of the Manic Pixie Dream Girl trope, a term that was coined soon after Garden State was released, though in reference to another movie.

== Accolades ==
Empire placed Garden State at number 393 on their list of the 500 Greatest Films of All Time. In 2014, Jon Dolan of Rolling Stone referred to Garden State as the film "that helped make Hollywood safe for indie pop".

In addition to being a nominee for the Grand Jury prize at the 2004 Sundance Film Festival, Braff received Best New Director from the Chicago Film Critics Association, the Florida Film Critics Circle's Pauline Kael Breakout Award, Best Debut Director Award from the National Board of Review of Motion Pictures, Breakout of the Year from the Phoenix Film Critics Society, and Hollywood Breakthrough Director of the Year Award at the Hollywood Film Festival.

== Home media ==
After its limited release in theaters, the film gained more popularity during its DVD release on December 28, 2004, which includes commentaries, deleted scenes, and featurettes.

It was first released on Blu-ray in the UK on February 19, 2012. The Blu-ray was released in the US on March 4, 2014.
