= Chutes Too Narrow =

Studio album by The Shins
- Released: October 21, 2003
- Recorded: June–July 2003
- Studios: James Mercer's basement (Portland, Oregon); Avast! Studios (Seattle, Washington)
- Genres: Indie rock, indie pop, indie folk
- Length: 33:50
- Label: Sub Pop
- Producers: The Shins, Phil Ek

The Shins chronology
Oh, Inverted World (2001)	Chutes Too Narrow (2003)	Wincing the Night Away (2007)

Singles from Chutes Too Narrow
- 1. "So Says I" Released: September 21, 2003; 2. "Fighting in a Sack" Released: July 13, 2004; 3. "Pink Bullets" Released: May 5, 2005

Chutes Too Narrow is the second studio album by American rock band The Shins. Produced by Phil Ek and the band themselves, the album was released on October 21, 2003, through Sub Pop. The album title comes from a lyric in the song "Young Pilgrims". The album was universally acclaimed by critics, garnering an overall score of 88/100 on Metacritic. As of August 2008 according to Nielsen SoundScan, they have sold over 393,000 copies to date.

Chutes Too Narrow features cleaner production standards than The Shins' "lo-fi" debut Oh, Inverted World. This is largely due to the album's being mixed by producer Phil Ek, who has also worked with Built to Spill and Modest Mouse. Chutes Too Narrow also departs from the band's previous keyboard-driven sound and shifts towards more emphasis on guitars.

The album also included violin parts on "Saint Simon", played by Annemarie Ruljancich, and was nominated for a Grammy Award for Best Recording Package. The cover art was designed by Jesse LeDoux. The songs "Gone for Good" and "Those to Come" were used in the 2004 film In Good Company. "Those to Come" was also used in the 2005 film Winter Passing.

== Background and recording ==
Chutes Too Narrow was recorded in the basement of James Mercer's former home, located in a particularly rough neighborhood in Portland, Oregon. Although recording in the basement was less than pleasant, the band found it "cheaper than a real studio", with Mercer noting that "it only costs sixty bucks to buy deadbolts for the doors." Near the end of the recording process, the band was robbed of the computer they recorded on. "So the master files are now in some crack addict's basement," Mercer told Rolling Stone in 2003. Having cut ties with a bad relationship and a bad job, Mercer felt his songwriting reflected a broader perspective as a result. During the recording process, keyboardist Marty Crandall and his girlfriend, Elyse Sewell, saw a television advertisement for America's Next Top Model and joked that she should try out. Host Tyra Banks called Sewell a week later, who went on to win third prize while wearing "three different Shins T-shirts" on the program.

Following the record's completion, the album was mixed at Avast! Studios in Seattle and mastered at The Lodge in New York City.

== Music ==
Rolling Stone wrote that Chutes Too Narrow is "a study in old-school pop songwriting, full of Sixties-style psychedelic folk rock, abundant pop hooks and James Mercer's inimitable high-pitched croon."

== Release ==
"Fighting in a Sack" is the second single taken from Chutes Too Narrow. It was released on 13 July 2004.

== Critical reception ==
Professional ratings
Aggregate scores
Source	Rating
Metacritic	88/100
Review scores
Source	Rating
AllMusic	4/5 stars
Alternative Press	5/5
Entertainment Weekly	A−
The Guardian	3/5 stars
Mojo	5/5 stars
Pitchfork	8.9/10
Q	4/5 stars
Rolling Stone	4/5 stars
Spin	B
The Village Voice	A−

Chutes Too Narrow was met universal acclaim upon its October 2003 release. Matt LeMay of Pitchfork designated it "Best New Music", summarizing that "Not simply an excellent album, Chutes Too Narrow is also a powerful testament to pop music's capacity for depth, beauty and expressiveness." AllMusic's Heather Phares wrote that the band "excel[s] at sounding happy, sad, frustrated, and vulnerable at the same time, and their best songs, whether they're fast or slow, feel like they're bursting with nervous energy." The New York Times's Kelefa Sanneh called Chutes Too Narrow a "sly, restless album that includes a cryptic protest song—full of sugary harmonies and disconcerting slogans—and a dreamy meditation on ontogeny." Rolling Stone gave the record four stars, with reviewer Barry Walters commenting, "It must mean something that the freshest indie rock boasts tunes more substantial than what is sold in the mainstream."

Robert Christgau of The Village Voice called Mercer "a gifted melodist with an arranger's knack for psychedelicizing simple structures and a folkie's fondness for acoustic strum." Q called the record "a leap forward", while Uncut wrote that "You don't expect progression from such evident classicists, but there's a new clarity, poise and refinement." Mojo wrote that the album "sears through the essence of what makes this band special, the brave voice and ebullient delivery of singer-songwriter-guitarist James Mercer." Spin's Zac Crain compared their style to their "fellow travelers the New Pornographers", writing that "the Shins are reverent and referential, practically documenting their source material with footnotes, while acting like they own it." While Dave Simpson of The Guardian opined that "downbeat self-deprecation" permeates the recording, he wrote that "there's a certain small-town romance vibe throughout, they're not averse to surprises."

Stephen Thompson of The A.V. Club felt the record was a disappointment in contrast to its "near-perfect" predecessor, but did speak positively when comparing: "[Chutes Too Narrow] does share its intelligence and concision, as well as its remarkable ability to make kicky pop-rock sound both simple and complex, retro and modern." In contrast, The New Yorker considered the album an improvement over Oh, Inverted World: "With better writing, better playing and better singing, the album illustrates the breadth of the lead singer and songwriter James Mercer's vision; the cuts […] are elevated by accessible pop hooks and literate but unpretentious lyrics." Similarly, Robert Christgau felt it "faster and clearer" than the band's "paisley-fringed" debut, writing that the album "advances the Shins well beyond the dreamy indistinctness that has replaced lo-fi as Indieland's distancing strategy of choice." Alternative Press wrote that the band "satisfy largely by serving up more of what made their debut so good", and Blender felt similarly: "Their second album is equally charming and more consistent." Magnet felt it "a better record than the Shins' first—a sonically bolder production with fewer effects and more hooks per square inch than a flyrod factory." Will Hermes of Entertainment Weekly wrote that "[the band] follow 2001's pop-a-licious Oh Inverted World with just the record you'd want: production a bit bigger […] and songs more adventurous but no less indelible."

=== Accolades ===
Chutes Too Narrow appeared on numerous music critics' and publications' end-of-year albums lists. Stylus Magazine placed the record at number three on their respective list, while Billboard and The Village Voice's Pazz & Jop followed at number six. Pitchfork placed the record at number seven on their year-end list, writing that "Chutes Too Narrow shattered expectations, a meticulously sequenced, stripped-down collection of indie pop gems encompassing endless Technicolor universes." Mojo also placed the album at number seven on their list, and Rolling Stone on an unordered list of "Best Albums of 2003".

Publication	Country	Accolade	Year	Rank
The A.V. Club	US	The Best Music of the Decade	2009	17
NME	UK	The Top 100 Greatest Albums of the Decade	2009	75
Paste	US	The 50 Best Albums of the Decade (2000-2009)	2009	24
Pitchfork	US	The Top 200 Albums of the 2000s	2009	46
Slant Magazine	US	Best of the Aughts: Albums	2009	91
Uncut	UK	150 Greatest Albums Of The Decade	2009	113

== Track listing ==
All songs written and composed by James Mercer.

No.	Title	Length
1.	"Kissing the Lipless"	3:19
2.	"Mine's Not a High Horse"	3:20
3.	"So Says I"	2:48
4.	"Young Pilgrims"	2:47
5.	"Saint Simon"	4:25
6.	"Fighting in a Sack"	2:26
7.	"Pink Bullets"	3:53
8.	"Turn a Square"	3:11
9.	"Gone for Good"	3:13
10.	"Those to Come"	4:24

== Personnel ==
The Shins

- James Mercer – vocals, guitar, harmonica, production
- Dave Hernandez – bass, guitars, production
- Jesse Sandoval – drums, production
- Marty Crandall – keyboards, production

Additional musicians

- Annemarie Ruljancich – violin on "Saint Simon"
- Kevin Suggs – pedal steel guitar on "Gone for Good"

Production

- Phil Ek – production, mixing
- Jesse LeDoux – design
- Emily Lazar – mastering

== Charts ==
Chart performance for Chutes Too Narrow
Chart (2003–2004)	Peak position
Dutch Albums (Album Top 100)	82
UK Albums (Official Charts)	82
US Billboard 200	86

== Certifications ==
Region	Certification	Certified units/sales
United States (RIAA)	Gold	500,000^{‡}
^{‡} Sales+streaming figures based on certification alone.
