= Jesse Sandoval =

American drummer

- Born: November 15, 1974 (age 51)
- Origin: United States
- Genres: Indie rock, indie pop
- Instrument: drums
- Label: Sub Pop

Jesse Sandoval (born November 15, 1974) is the former drummer of American indie rock group The Shins. Sandoval initially formed Flake with singer-songwriter James Mercer, guitarist Neal Langford and bassist Marty Crandall in Albuquerque, New Mexico in 1992. Sandoval and Mercer then went on to form The Shins as a side project, intending to play as a duo, but were eventually joined again by Marty Crandall on keyboard and Dave Hernandez on bass. Sandoval, along with other band members, later moved to Portland, Oregon.

In 2009, Sandoval was dismissed from the Shins along with longtime members Crandall and Hernandez. Mercer described the move as an "aesthetic decision", and later explained "I try not to think about it as a firing as much as a new phase in the process." Sandoval gave his side of the story in an interview with the Portland Mercury, stating that he "unequivocally got fired" but did not bear Mercer any ill will.

After leaving the Shins, Sandoval opened a food cart in Portland, "Nuevo Mexico", where he serves traditional New Mexican food, including stuffed sopaipillas. He drew upon his experience helping in his mother's food cart, which worked festivals in New Mexico.

Jesse made an appearance on Darren Hanlon's album Fingertips & Mountaintops.
