= The Shins =

American indie rock band

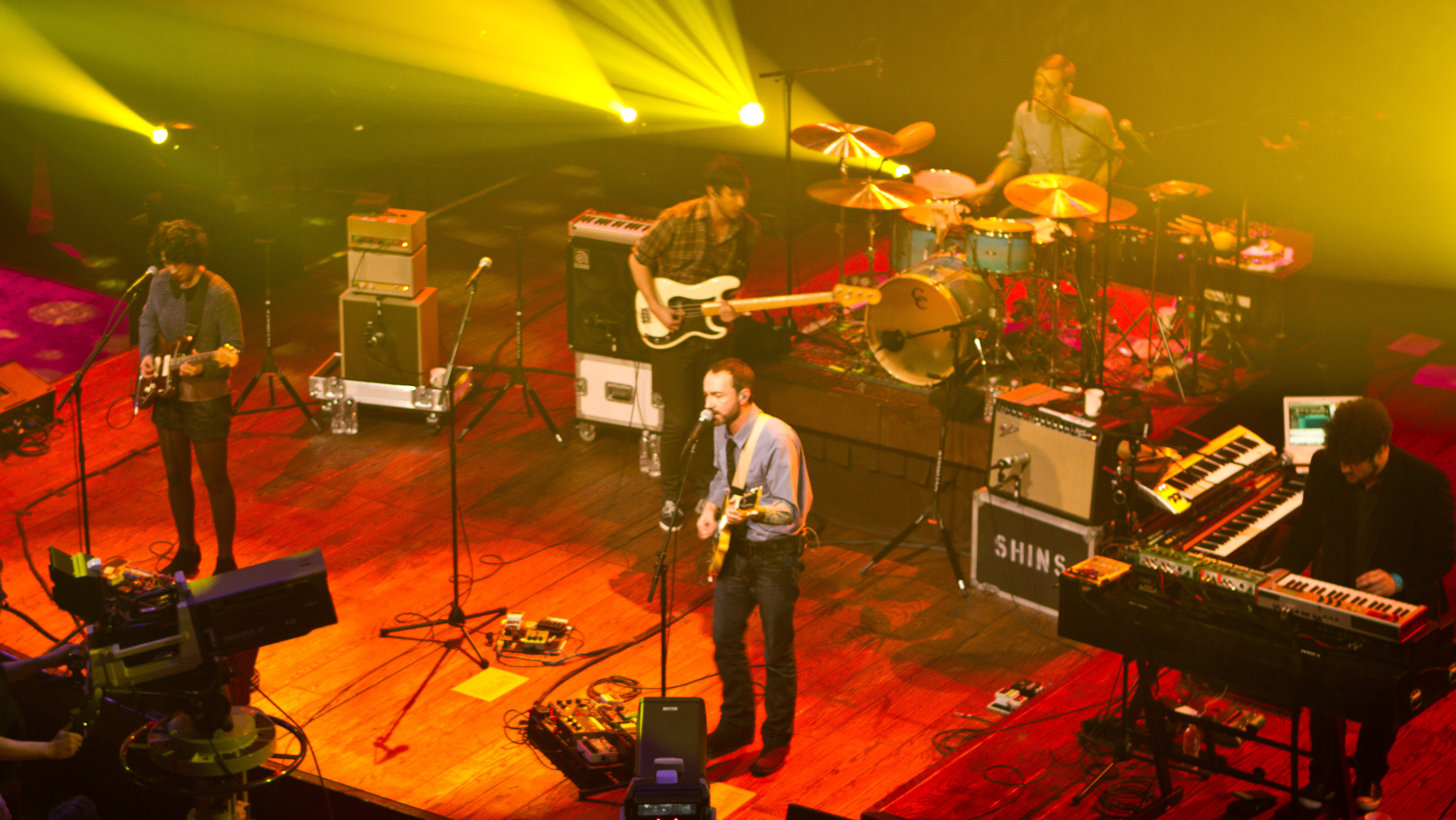
- The Shins performing for an episode of Austin City Limits in March 2012

Background information
- Origin: Albuquerque, New Mexico, U.S.
- Genre: Indie rock
- Years active: 1996–present
- Labels: Columbia; Warner Bros.; Sub Pop; Transgressive; Cargo Music
- Spinoff of: Flake Music
- Members: James Mercer; Yuuki Matthews; Mark Watrous; Jon Sortland; Patti King
- Past members: Neal Langford; Jessica Dobson; Jesse Sandoval; Dave Hernandez; Eric D. Johnson; Ron Lewis; Martin Crandall; Joe Plummer; Richard Swift; Casey Foubert
- Website: www.theshins.com

The Shins is an American indie rock band formed in Albuquerque, New Mexico, in 1996. The band is the project of singer-songwriter James Mercer, who has served as the band's sole constant member throughout numerous line-up changes. The band's current line-up consists of Mercer, alongside Yuuki Matthews (bass, keyboards), Mark Watrous (guitar, keyboards, lap steel), Patti King (keyboards), and Jon Sortland (drums). They are based in Portland, Oregon.

The band was formed by Mercer as a side project to Flake Music, who were active from 1992 to 1999. Flake Music released two 7-inch singles and a full-length album, When You Land Here, It's Time to Return, on Omnibus Records and were touring with Modest Mouse when the Shins became signed to Sub Pop Records. The Shins' first two records, Oh, Inverted World (2001) and Chutes Too Narrow (2003), performed well commercially and received critical acclaim. The single "New Slang" brought the band to mainstream attention when it was featured in the 2004 film Garden State. Consequently, the band's third album, Wincing the Night Away (2007), was a major success for the group, peaking at number two on the Billboard 200 and earning a Grammy Award nomination.

Following this, the Shins signed to Columbia Records and Mercer parted ways with the entire original lineup, deeming it "an aesthetic decision". Following a near five-year hiatus, Port of Morrow, the band's fourth studio album, was released in 2012. Their fifth album, Heartworms, was released in March 2017.

== History ==
=== 1996–2000: Early years ===
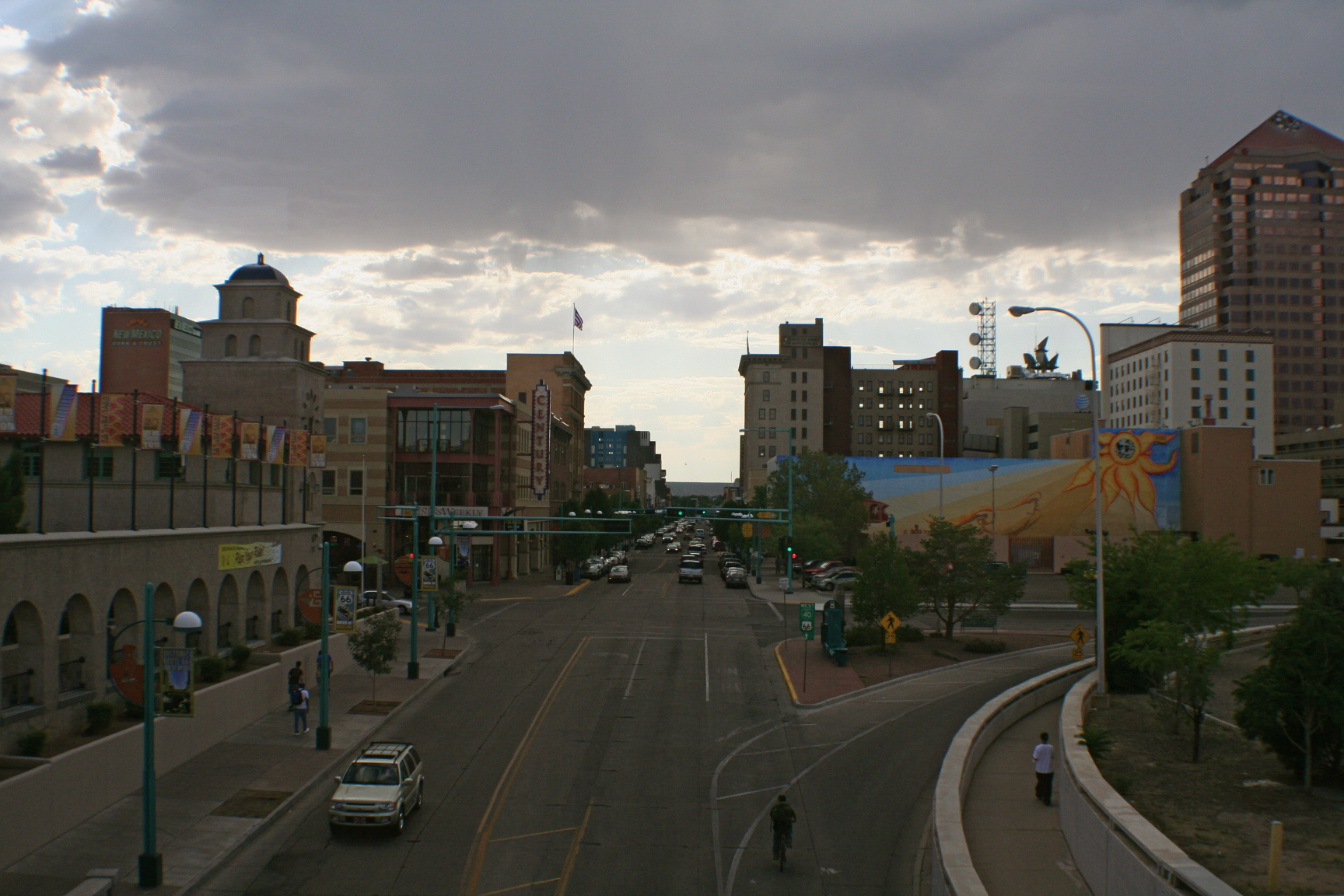
The Shins were formed in Albuquerque, New Mexico.

The Shins was formed in 1996 by James Mercer, a member of the band Flake Music in Albuquerque, New Mexico. Flake Music (formerly known simply as Flake) consisted of members guitarist/vocalist James Mercer, drummer Jesse Sandoval, keyboardist Martin Crandall, and bassist Neal Langford. The group began in 1992 and released a string of singles, the Spork EP, and an album, When You Land Here, It's Time to Return, which was well received. The band toured with Modest Mouse and Califone. Mercer formed the Shins for a change of pace and enlisted Sandoval on drums. When asked what it was that began his interest in music, Mercer said "... it got me out of my shell and gave me a social life." They began performing as a duo alongside Cibo Matto and the American Analog Set. Mercer became the band's primary songwriter, and consequently, "the group developed a more focused, crafted sound than Flake Music's charming, if somewhat rambling, collaborative style." His focus on percussive guitar playing still led friends to compare his demos as too similar to Flake, and he focused on taking the music in a different direction. Unlike Flake, Mercer was the band's sole lyricist, and songs were built from his initial structure. The group added Scared of Chaka's Dave Hernandez and Ron Skrasek to complete their lineup, but the two musicians left before the end of the decade to pursue their work with Scared of Chaka. By 1999, Flake Music disbanded and Neal Langford joined the Shins.

The Shins issued their first release — the 7" EP Nature Bears a Vacuum — in 1998 via Omnibus Records. Following the completion of their debut single release, "When I Goose-Step", the Shins embarked on a tour with Modest Mouse. Mercer became a "hermit" crafting what would become the group's debut album, and became depressed with his life in Albuquerque. Friends of the band, including Zeke Howard from Love As Laughter and Isaac Brock from Modest Mouse sent record labels cassette demos of the band's songs. Mercer sent a demo to Sub Pop Records in Seattle, Washington, and label co-founder Jonathan Poneman caught a concert in San Francisco while the band was on tour with Modest Mouse. He offered the band a one-off single deal, and the Shins' second single, "New Slang", was included as part of their Single-of-the-Month series, issuing a 7" single to fan club members in February 2001. Positive press for "New Slang" made the group's debut album one of the most anticipated indie rock albums of 2001, and Sub Pop signed the band in full. "Before you knew it, my whole life was upside down: I got signed, I quit my job, I moved out of town, the big relationship I'd had for five years ended. All of a sudden my whole life was up in smoke", recalled Mercer.

=== 2001–2003: Oh, Inverted World and Chutes Too Narrow ===
The band's debut LP, Oh, Inverted World (2001), was released in June 2001, with a compact disc version following the next month. Much of the album was recorded prior to the Sub Pop deal in Mercer's basement. The album received critical acclaim and solidified the band as one of indie rock's definitive artists, while also placing Albuquerque on the musical map with Oh, Inverted World's "gloriously skewed pop and [how it is] dripping with yearning, whimsy and brittle innocence." The album helped re-establish Sub Pop Records as a dominant force in the independent community; the label had been without a marquee artist for many of the prior years. The group spent the rest of the year touring with acts such as Preston School of Industry and Red House Painters. "New Slang" proved to be a "stealth hit", helping Oh, Inverted World move over 100,000 copies within two years, considered remarkable for an independent label; Sub Pop had hoped the record would sell 10,000 copies. Mercer was positive in licensing the song to a variety of media, confirming to The New York Times that he received more money from touring and licensing than record sales. The song was featured in a McDonald's advert that aired during the 2002 Winter Olympics, which led to criticism from several corners, among those independent music fans and the band's own hometown alt weekly.

The royalties Mercer earned from the commercial allowed him to purchase a home and relocate to Portland, Oregon, where the group built a basement studio and recorded their second album, Chutes Too Narrow (2003). During this period, the group replaced Langford on bass with Dave Hernandez (from Scared of Chaka). Having cut ties with a bad relationship and a bad job, Mercer felt his songwriting reflected a broader perspective as a result. Although recording in the basement was less than pleasant, the band found it "cheaper than a real studio". The home was broken into at one point, and thieves stole the master tapes for Oh, Inverted World. The album was released in October 2003 to critical acclaim, appearing on numerous music critics' and publications' end-of-year albums lists. It also became their first album to chart, peaking at number 86 on the Billboard 200.

=== 2004–2007: Mainstream success and Wincing the Night Away ===
"New Slang"
"New Slang" was featured in the 2004 film Garden State and brought the band mainstream success.

"New Slang" was repurposed when it was prominently featured in the film Garden State (2004). In a scene from the film, Sam (portrayed by Natalie Portman) tells Andrew Largeman (played by director Zach Braff) that the song "will change your life." The song "changed everything" for the group, causing their first two albums to sell more than twice what they had sold prior to the film's debut. "Almost overnight, the Shins became indie-rock icons," wrote Robert Levine of Spin. The band extended their tour in support of the song and its popularity. "We saw a change in our audience. By the time we were done touring for Chutes Too Narrow, there was this new interest", said Mercer. "We toured again almost as the soundtrack to that movie, and colleges were all of a sudden interested in us playing on their campuses. We wanted to consummate the new relationship by touring and having a relationship with them. I mean, it just kept growing!" This additional exposure helped Oh, Inverted World move 500,000 units in the United States. Fans of the group had mixed reactions at their newfound success; some regarded their unknown nature as an integral part of their appeal. The band also appeared in season four, episode 17 of Gilmore Girls while Rory and Paris are on spring break in Florida.

Mercer began writing the band's third record in late 2005, employing ideas and riff fragments collected over the band's various tours. Suffering from insomnia, he would often wake up in the middle of the night and piece together songs in his home studio until dawn. For their third album, the group for the first time turned to an outside producer: Joe Chiccarelli, who produced Frank Zappa. Inspired primarily by a painful breakup and the group's newfound success, the album was initially set to be released in the summer of 2006. It was later pushed back to fall, and finally released in January 2007. Wincing the Night Away represented a major jump for the Shins in terms of commercial success: the album peaked at number two (in comparison to its predecessors' peak of number 86), setting a record for Sub Pop. It moved over 100,000 copies in its opening week, and was nominated for a Grammy Award for Best Alternative Album. Following the success of the album, The Shins left their longtime label, Sub Pop, for Mercer's own label, Aural Apothecary.

=== 2008–2013: Line-up change and Port of Morrow ===
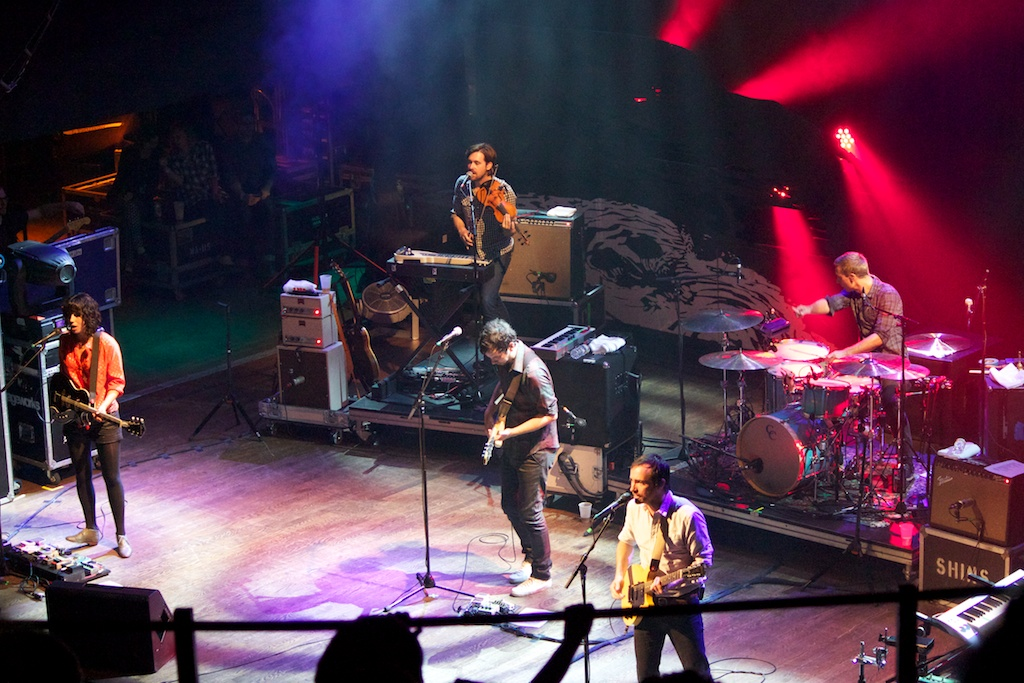
The Shins performing in 2012.

Having worked on The Shins for nearly a decade, Mercer felt exhausted and ready to quit the band. "Mainly I was tired of being right in the middle and everything sort of revolving around me, including the friendship dynamics-slash-bandmate dynamics and the creative aspect", Mercer explained in 2012. Noting that the band had never been bigger, some aspects of the limelight made him uncomfortable. Mercer was approached by Brian Burton (Danger Mouse) around this same period regarding a possible collaboration on a new project, which became Broken Bells. Enjoying the fresh approach with Broken Bells in regard to meeting new musicians, Mercer desired to continue that feeling. Mercer parted ways with longtime bandmates Dave Hernandez, Martin Crandall and Jesse Sandoval, terming it "an aesthetic decision". Sandoval instead told The Portland Mercury he was "unequivocally fired" from the group by Mercer. Mercer would later relate that his decision was "tremendously difficult", but instead wished to view it as a new phase.

Working with Burton on Broken Bells helped Mercer overcome fears of collaboration, which in turn influenced the rotating "cast of characters" that grouped together around him to record Port of Morrow, which became the fourth album under The Shins brand upon its March 2012 release. Mercer was the only original member. "I always loved these auteurs who presented themselves as bands", Mercer later explained, referencing Neutral Milk Hotel and Lilys as examples, which led to him feeling as though he could pursue something similar, allowing the concept of The Shins to carry on. Producer Greg Kurstin had a particular influence on Port of Morrow, encouraging Mercer to experiment in the studio. Mercer began touring with an all new backing band, including fellow songwriters Jessica Dobson and Richard Swift, Modest Mouse drummer Joe Plummer, and Yuuki Matthews from the Crystal Skulls. Port of Morrow debuted at number three on the US chart, and lead single "Simple Song" represented the band's best chart performance, peaking within the top 10 on the US Alternative Songs chart.

=== 2014–present: Heartworms and recent events ===
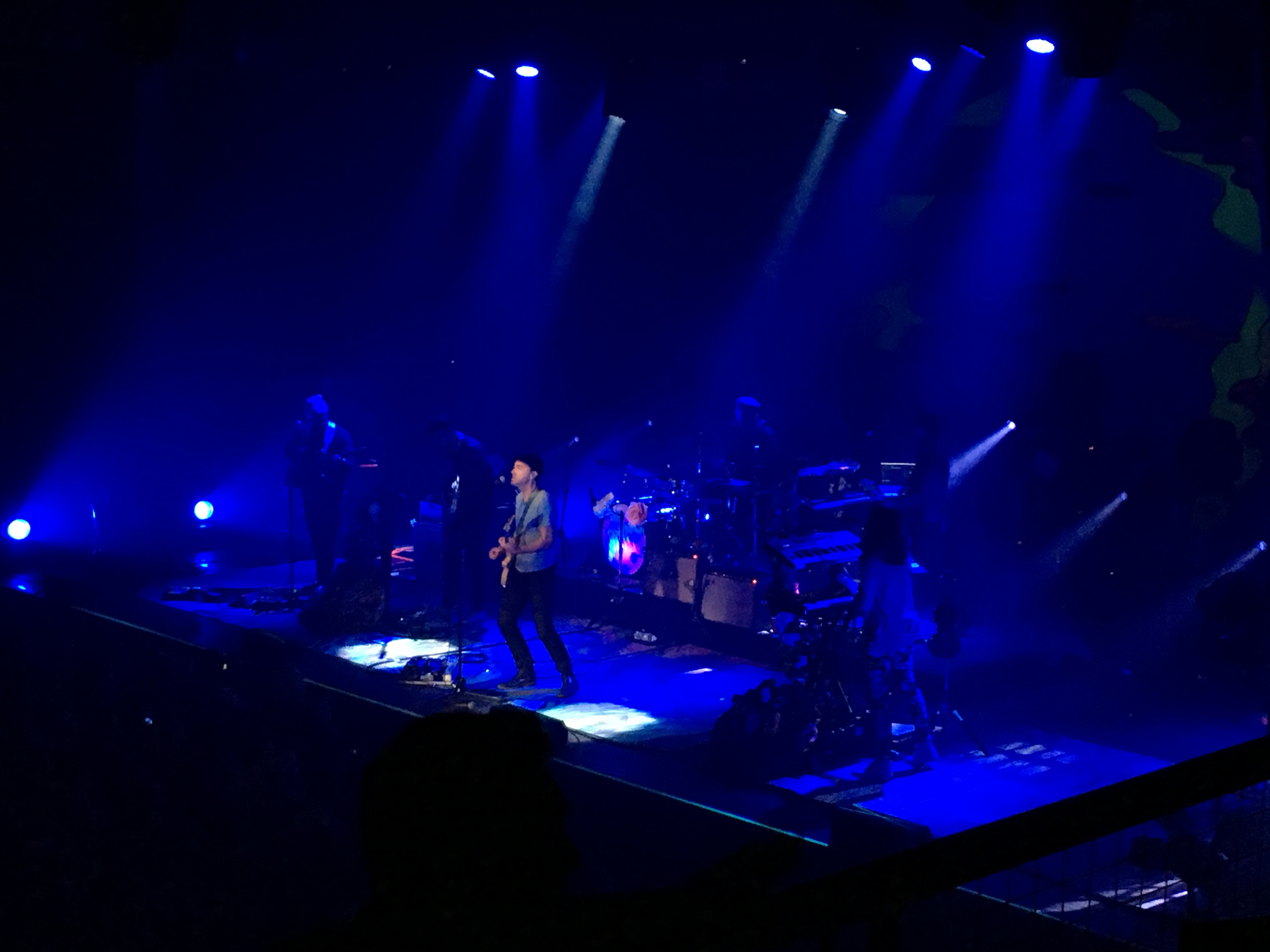
The Shins performing in 2017.

In 2014, The Shins recorded and released a new song, "So Now What", for the soundtrack of Wish I Was Here (directed by Zach Braff of Garden State). Mercer noted to Billboard that he was immensely proud of how the track came out: "I think it's one of the best things I've ever done." That November, a reissue of Flake Music's first album, When You Land Here, It's Time to Return, was released.

In 2016, the group recorded a cover of the Beatles' "The Word" for the Netflix show Beat Bugs. During this time, Mercer was at work on the band's fifth album, which he felt was closer in sound to the Shins' earlier work than Port of Morrow: "I made a concerted effort on certain songs to fit the palette, to use the palette that I've used historically for the band." Mercer announced the new Shins album, Heartworms, in January; it was released on March 10, 2017. In January 2018, they released The Worm's Heart, an album which reimagined Heartworms.

Former band member Richard Swift died on July 3, 2018. He was admitted to the hospital in June for hepatitis.

September 24, 2020 saw the release of a new single titled "The Great Divide".

In April 2021, a 20th anniversary reissue of Oh, Inverted World was announced for release on June 11, 2021. The reissue was remastered by Bob Ludwig, with Mercer serving as an assistant. A "21st birthday" tour of North America was announced in May 2022, where The Shins played Oh Inverted World in its entirety.

Former bassist Neal Langford, who played on Oh Inverted World and in Flake Music with Mercer, died on July 21, 2023, at the age of 50. Mercer announced his death on July 27, describing him in a post to social media as "one of the best friends I've ever had".

== Musical style and influences ==
Mercer described the Shins as a "pop project" from the beginning. The group were inspired by any and all music that they discovered. "Everything we listen to [...] makes its way in somehow, but we've been inspired by a bunch of bands who basically just keep reinventing the same thing", said Mercer. The group received comparisons to the "pop revivalists" at the Elephant 6 Recording Collective early in their career, such as The Apples in Stereo, whilst Mercer's vivid, often surrealist lyrics and infectious melodies drew comparisons to the songwriting style of Robert Pollard from Guided by Voices. Rolling Stone credited the band with bringing "the pop traditions of 1960s pop bands—groups like the Zombies, and the Beach Boys—to a new generation of music fans."

== Members ==
Current

- James Mercer – lead vocals, guitar, keyboards, bass (1996–present)
- Yuuki Matthews – bass, keyboards, backing vocals (2011–present)
- Mark Watrous – guitar, keyboards, lap steel, backing vocals (2012–present)
- Jon Sortland – drums, backing vocals (2016–present)
- Patti King – keyboards, backing vocals (2016–present)

Former

- Jesse Sandoval – drums, percussion (1996–2009)
- Martin Crandall – keyboards, backing vocals (1998–2009), bass (1998–2000, 2003–2009)
- Dave Hernandez – bass, guitar, backing vocals (1998–2000, 2003–2009)
- Neal Langford – bass (2000–2003; died 2023)
- Eric Johnson – guitar, keyboards, piano, banjo, backing vocals (2007–2011)
- Ron Lewis – bass (2009–2011)
- Joe Plummer – drums, percussion, backing vocals (2009–2016)
- Jessica Dobson – guitar, bass, keyboards, backing vocals (2011–2013)
- Richard Swift – keyboards, piano, organ, synthesizers, bass, guitar, percussion, drone box, backing vocals (2011–2016; died 2018)
- Casey Foubert – guitar (2016–2018)

== Discography ==
Studio albums

- Oh, Inverted World (2001)
- Chutes Too Narrow (2003)
- Wincing the Night Away (2007)
- Port of Morrow (2012)
- Heartworms (2017)

Remix albums

- The Worm's Heart (2018)

Extended plays

- Nature Bears a Vacuum (1999)
- Live Session EP (iTunes Exclusive) (2007)
- Port of Morrow Acoustic EP (2012)

== Awards and nominations ==
- Nominated: (2008) Grammy Award for Best Alternative Music Album for Wincing the Night Away
