= Greg Kurstin production discography =

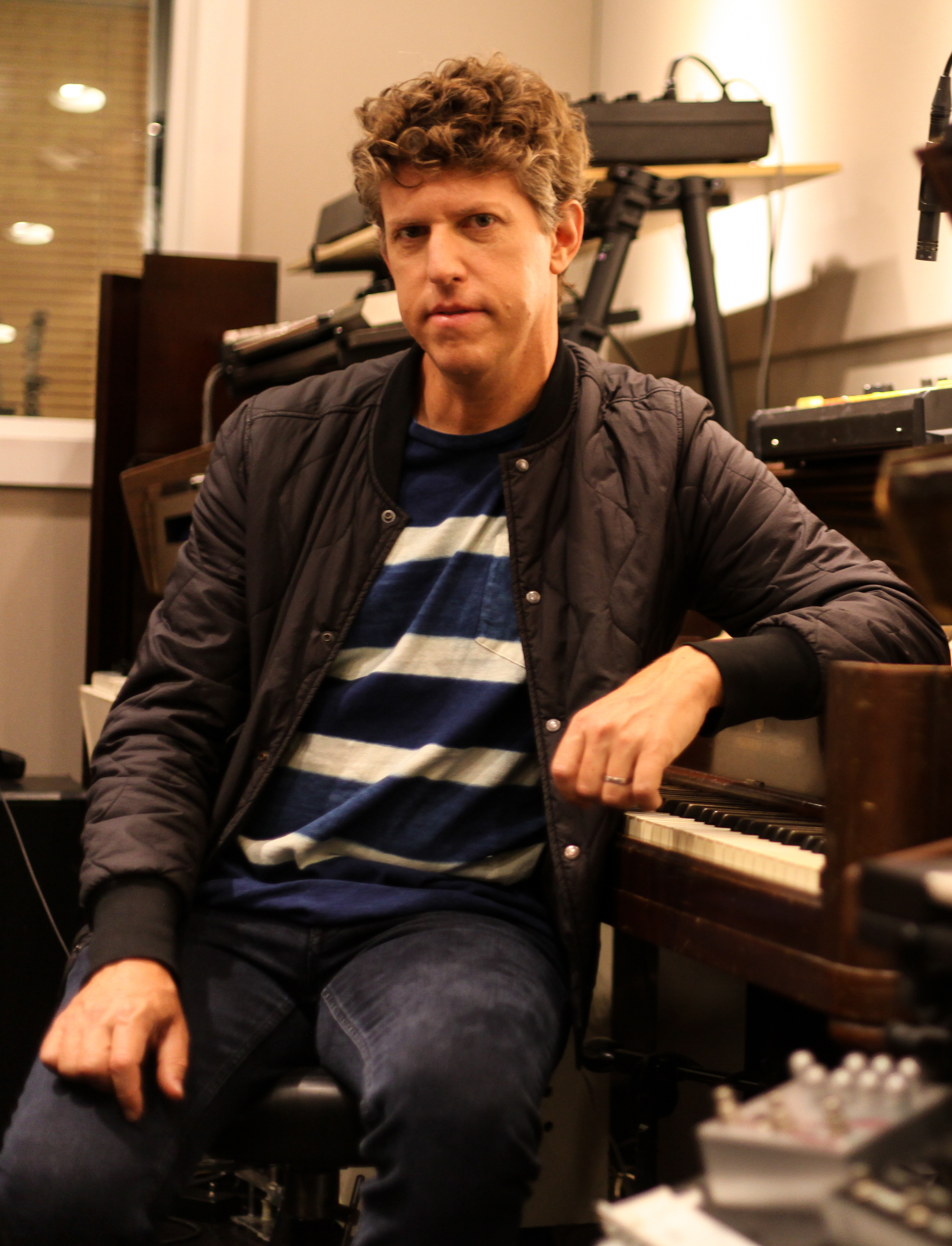
Kurstin in 2017

American record producer, songwriter, and multi-instrumentalist Greg Kurstin has written, produced, engineered, and performed on albums and tracks for a wide range of recording artists, spanning from pop, rock, to indie, jazz and Christmas music. In addition, he has written and produced records as Action Figure Party and as part of the musical duos Geggy Tah and the Bird and the Bee. He has won 8 Grammy Awards, including Producer of the Year in 2017 and 2018.

Immediately after graduating from The New School for Jazz and Contemporary Music in New York City, Kurstin relocated to his hometown of Los Angeles and collaborated with singer-songwriter Tommy Jordan to form Geggy Tah. In 1993, I Geggy Tah signed to David Byrne's Luaka Bop label. They released three studio albums:Grand Opening (1994), Sacred Cow (1996), and Into the Oh (2001). In 1999, Kurstin was signed to Verve Records and released an eponymous album under a pseudonymous name, Action Figure Party. He formed The Bird and the Bee in 2006 with Inara George. They have released four albums and seven EPS since their 2007 debut.

In the early 2000s, Kurstin began to write and produce tracks for recording artists and bands including Peaches, All Saints, P!nk, the Flaming Lips, Kylie Minogue and Lily Allen. He won three Ivor Novello Awards for his work on Allen's double-platinum It's Not Me, It's You in 2010. He has since been nominated for 14 Grammy Awards, including Producer of the Year (in 2010 and 2014), Record of the Year and Song of the Year (for Kelly Clarkson's "Stronger (What Doesn't Kill You)" (2011), and Record of the Year for Sia's "Chandelier" in 2014. In addition to his Producer of the Year wins in 2017 and 2018, he has won Grammys for Song of the Year, Record of the Year, Album of the Year, Best Engineered Album, and Best Alternative Music Album.

Kurstin has worked with artists including Adele, Beck, Foo Fighters, Liam Gallagher, Kendrick Lamar, Paul McCartney, and Tegan and Sara as well as Clarkson, P!nk, and Sia. He co-wrote and produced three songs on the Adele album 25, including its first single,"Hello," released in 2015. He teamed up again with Adele in 2021, co-writing and producing "Easy on Me", the debut single from her album 30.

== Written and produced songs ==
=== 2000 to 2006 ===
Name of song, featured performers, originating album, year released and specified role.
Year	Title	Artist	Album	Songwriter	Producer				Ref(s).
Year	Title	Artist	Album	Songwriter	Primary	Secondary	Additional	Vocal	Ref(s).
1982	"Crunchy Water"	Dweezil Zappa	Non-album single	check					
2003	"Bring the Funk"	Ben Harper	Diamonds on the Inside	check					
2003	"Mix It Up"	Willie Jones III	Vol. 2...Don't Knock the Swing	check					
2005	"There is No Alternative"	Tina Sugandh	Ice Princess OST	check	check				
2005	"Get Me Out of Here"	Marion Raven	Here I Am	check					
2005	"Waiting Game"	Rachel Stevens	Non-album single	check	check				
2006	"Haven't Got a Clue"	The Flaming Lips	At War with the Mystics	check			check		
2006	"Centerfold"	P!nk	I'm Not Dead	check	check				
2006	"Anti-Hero" (featuring Lisa Loeb)	Rin'	Inland Sea	check					
2006	"Dancing Diva (舞孃)"	Jolin Tsai	Dancing Diva	check					
2006	"A Public Affair"	Jessica Simpson	A Public Affair	check					
2006	"Downtown"	Peaches	Impeach My Bush	check	check				
2006	"Tent in Your Pants"	Peaches	Impeach My Bush	check	check				
2006	"Make Me"	Peaches	Impeach My Bush	check	check				
2006	"Everything's Just Wonderful"	Lily Allen	Alright, Still	check	check				
2006	"Not Big"	Lily Allen	Alright, Still	check	check				
2006	"Alfie"	Lily Allen	Alright, Still	check	check				
2006	"U Killed It"	Lily Allen	Alright, Still	check	check				
2006	"Chelsea"	Stefy	The Orange Album	check					
2006	"If You Were Mine"	Jessica Simpson	A Public Affair	check	check				
2006	"Cover Up"	Stefy	The Orange Album	check					
2006	"Backass" (featuring Peaches)	Karen O	Jackass Number Two OST	check	check				
2006	"Utopía"	Belinda	Utopía	check	check				
2006	"Never Enough"	Belinda	Utopía	check	check				
2006	"Rhapsody in Joshua Tree"	Bob Forrest	Modern Folk and Blues: Wednesday	check					
2006	"Rock Steady"	All Saints	Studio 1	check	check				
2006	"On and On"	All Saints	Studio 1	check	check				
2006	"Not Eazy"	All Saints	Studio 1	check	check				
2006	"One Me and U"	All Saints	Studio 1	check	check				
2006	"Headlock"	All Saints	Studio 1	check	check				
2006	"In It to Win It"	All Saints	Studio 1	check	check				

=== 2007 to 2011 ===
Name of song, featured performers, originating album, year released and specified role.
Year	Title	Artist	Album	Songwriter	Producer				Ref(s).
Year	Title	Artist	Album	Songwriter	Primary	Secondary	Additional	Vocal	Ref(s).
2007	"Catch You"	Sophie Ellis-Bextor	Trip the Light Fantastic	check	check				
2007	"Redlight District"	Porcelain Black	Porcelain and the Tramps	check	check				
2007	"Backyard"	Natasha Bedingfield	N.B.	check	check				
2007	"You're Out"	Dead Disco	Non-album single	check	check				
2007	"Competition"	Dragonette	Galore		check				
2007	"True Believer"	Dragonette	Galore		check				
2007	"Black Limousine"	Dragonette	Galore	check	check				
2007	"No More Rain"	Kylie Minogue	X		check				
2007	"Wow"	Kylie Minogue	X	check	check				
2007	"Magnetic Electric"	Kylie Minogue	X	check	check				
2007	"King or Queen"	Kylie Minogue	X	check	check				
2007	"Carried Away"	Kylie Minogue	X	check	check				
2007	"Do It Again"	Kylie Minogue	X	check	check				
2008	"Death by Chocolate"	Sia	Some People Have Real Problems	check					
2008	"Stamp Your Feet"	Donna Summer	Crayons	check	check				
2008	"Crayons" (featuring Ziggy Marley)	Donna Summer	Crayons	check	check				
2008	"Drivin' Down Brazil"	Donna Summer	Crayons	check	check				
2008	"Aciiid!"	Jem	Down to Earth	check	check				
2008	"Professional Suicide"	Ladyhawke	Ladyhawke	check	check				
2008	"Rock Me In"	Britney Spears	Circus	check	check				
2009	"The Fear"	Lily Allen	It's Not Me, It's You	check	check				
2009	"Everyone's at It"	Lily Allen	It's Not Me, It's You	check	check				
2009	"Not Fair"	Lily Allen	It's Not Me, It's You	check	check				
2009	"22"	Lily Allen	It's Not Me, It's You	check	check				
2009	"I Could Say"	Lily Allen	It's Not Me, It's You	check	check				
2009	"Back to the Start"	Lily Allen	It's Not Me, It's You	check	check				
2009	"Never Gonna Happen"	Lily Allen	It's Not Me, It's You	check	check				
2009	"Fuck You"	Lily Allen	It's Not Me, It's You	check	check				
2009	"Who'd Have Known"	Lily Allen	It's Not Me, It's You	check	check				
2009	"Chinese"	Lily Allen	It's Not Me, It's You	check	check				
2009	"Him"	Lily Allen	It's Not Me, It's You	check	check				
2009	"He Wasn't There"	Lily Allen	It's Not Me, It's You	check	check				
2009	"Kabul Shit"	Lily Allen	It's Not Me, It's You	check	check				
2009	"Fag Hag"	Lily Allen	It's Not Me, It's You	check	check				
2009	"Straight to Hell"	Lily Allen	War Child presents Heroes		check				
2009	"Why"	Lily Allen	Non-album single	check	check				
2009	"Don't Shoot (I'm a Man)"	Devo	Something for Everybody		check				
2009	"The Sea is On Fire"	Stardeath and White; Dwarfs	The Birth				check		
2009	"New Heat"	Stardeath and White; Dwarfs	The Birth				check		
2009	"Keep Score"	Stardeath and White; Dwarfs	The Birth				check		
2009	"The Birth"	Stardeath and White; Dwarfs	The Birth				check		
2009	"Those Who Are Far from the Sun Return to the Sun"	Stardeath and White; Dwarfs	The Birth				check		
2009	"I Can't Get Away"	Stardeath and White; Dwarfs	The Birth				check		
2009	"The Age of the Freak"	Stardeath and White; Dwarfs	The Birth				check		
2009	"Country Ballad"	Stardeath and White; Dwarfs	The Birth				check		
2009	"The March"	Stardeath and White; Dwarfs	The Birth				check		
2009	"Smoking Pot Makes Me Not Want to Kill Myself"	Stardeath and White; Dwarfs	The Birth				check		
2009	"Mama Do (Uh Oh, Uh Oh)"	Pixie Lott	Turn It Up				check		
2009	"Earthquakes"	Little Boots	Hands	check	check				
2009	"New in Town"	Little Boots	Hands	check	check				
2009	"Stuck on Repeat"	Little Boots	Hands	check					
2009	"Meddle"	Little Boots	Hands	check			check		
2009	"Mathematics"	Little Boots	Hands	check	check				
2009	"Catch 22"	Little Boots	Hands	check	check				
2009	"Romance is Dead"	Paloma Faith	Do You Want the Truth or Something Beautiful?		check				
2009	"Tall Boy"	Har Mar Superstar	Dark Touches	check	check				
2009	"Before We Come Undone"	Kris Allen	Kris Allen	check	check				
2009	"You've Changed"	Sia	We Are Born		check				
2010	"Animal"	Kesha	Animal	check	check				
2010	"Heartbroken"	Meaghan Smith	The Cricket's Orchestra		check				
2010	"Oh No!"	Marina and the Diamonds	The Family Jewels	check	check				
2010	"Fresh"	Devo	Something for Everybody		check				
2010	"Superman"	Gabriella Cilmi	Ten	check	check				
2010	"Clap Your Hands"	Sia	We Are Born		check				
2010	"Charlie"	Miranda Cosgrove	Sparks Fly	check	check				
2010	"Rather Be Your Lover"	Debi Nova	Luna Nueva	check	check				
2010	"Ring Round"	Jackie Q	Get Him to the Greek OST	check	check				
2010	"What We Do"	Devo	Something for Everybody		check				
2010	"Please Baby Please"	Devo	Something for Everybody		check				
2010	"Mind Games"	Devo	Something for Everybody		check				
2010	"Human Rocket"	Devo	Something for Everybody		check				
2010	"Later is Now"	Devo	Something for Everybody		check				
2010	"No Place Like Home"	Devo	Something for Everybody		check				
2010	"March On"	Devo	Something for Everybody		check				
2010	"The Fight"	Sia	We Are Born		check				
2010	"Stop Trying"	Sia	We Are Born	check	check				
2010	"Be Good to Me"	Sia	We Are Born		check				
2010	"Bring Night"	Sia	We Are Born	check	check				
2010	"Hurting Me Now"	Sia	We Are Born	check	check				
2010	"Never Gonna Leave Me"	Sia	We Are Born	check	check				
2010	"Cloud"	Sia	We Are Born		check				
2010	"I'm in Here"	Sia	We Are Born		check				
2010	"The Co-Dependent"	Sia	We Are Born	check	check				
2010	"Big Girl Little Girl"	Sia	We Are Born		check				
2010	"Oh Father"	Sia	We Are Born		check				
2010	"Hold Me Down"	Sia	We Are Born		check				
2010	"Déjà Vu"	3OH!3	Streets of Gold	check	check				
2010	"I Know How to Say"	3OH!3	Streets of Gold	check	check				
2010	"I'm Not the One"	3OH!3	Streets of Gold	check	check				
2010	"Nobody"	Eliza Doolittle	Eliza Doolittle	check	check				
2010	"Empty Hand"	Eliza Doolittle	Eliza Doolittle	check	check				
2010	"Save Your Goodbye"	Mike Posner	31 Minutes to Takeoff	check	check				
2010	"Synthesizer"	Mike Posner	31 Minutes to Takeoff	check	check				
2010	"Falling"	Mike Posner	31 Minutes to Takeoff	check	check				
2010	"Glamour Puss"	KT Tunstall	Tiger Suit	check	check				
2010	"(Still a) Weirdo"	KT Tunstall	Tiger Suit	check	check				
2010	"Replace Your Heart"	The Wanted	The Wanted	check	check				
2010	"Superstar"	James Blunt	Some Kind of Trouble	check	check				
2011	"Bittersweet"	Panic! at the Disco	Vices & Virtues	check	check				
2011	"Sex Rules"	Sky Ferreira	As If! EP	check	check				
2011	"99 Tears"	Sky Ferreira	As If! EP	check	check				
2011	"Sayonara"	Miranda Cosgrove	High Maintenance EP	check	check				
2011	"Revolution"	Sophie Ellis-Bextor	Make a Scene	check	check				
2011	"Homewrecker"	Sophie Ellis-Bextor	Make a Scene	check	check				
2011	"Miles"	Christina Perri	Lovestrong	check					
2011	"Helena Beat"	Foster the People	Torches		check				
2011	"Waste"	Foster the People	Torches		check				
2011	"Miss You"	Foster the People	Torches		check				
2011	"Warrant"	Foster the People	Torches		check				
2011	"Whiplash"	Selena Gomez and the Scene	When the Sun Goes Down	check	check				
2011	"Different"	Ximena Sariñana	Ximena Sariñana		check				
2011	"The Bid"	Ximena Sariñana	Ximena Sariñana	check	check				
2011	"Echo Park"	Ximena Sariñana	Ximena Sariñana	check	check				
2011	"Bringing Us Down"	Ximena Sariñana	Ximena Sariñana		check				
2011	"Tomorrow"	Ximena Sariñana	Ximena Sariñana	check	check				
2011	"Common Ground"	Ximena Sariñana	Ximena Sariñana	check	check				
2011	"Love Again"	Ximena Sariñana	Ximena Sariñana		check				
2011	"Wrong Miracle"	Ximena Sariñana	Ximena Sariñana		check				
2011	"Stay Alive"	Hard-Fi	Killer Sounds	check	check				
2011	"Sweat"	Hard-Fi	Killer Sounds	check	check				
2011	"Sally I Can See You"	Kimbra	Vows	check	check				
2011	"Posse"	Kimbra	Vows	check	check				
2011	"Say Something Now"	James Morrison	The Awakening	check					
2011	"Beautiful Life"	James Morrison	The Awakening	check					
2011	"5 O'Clock" (featuring Wiz Khalifa and Lily Allen)	T-Pain	Revolver	check					
2011	"Stronger (What Doesn't Kill You)"	Kelly Clarkson	Stronger	check	check				
2011	"Dark Side"	Kelly Clarkson	Stronger		check				
2011	"Honestly"	Kelly Clarkson	Stronger		check				
2011	"Poisoned with Love"	Neon Hitch	Non-album single	check	check				
2011	"Pretty Ugly"	Parade	Parade	check	check				
2011	"Don't Kick the Chair" (featuring Kid Cudi)	Dia Frampton	Red		check				

=== 2012 to 2017 ===
Name of song, featured performers, originating album, year released and specified role.
Year	Title	Artist	Album	Songwriter	Producer				Ref(s).
Year	Title	Artist	Album	Songwriter	Primary	Secondary	Additional	Vocal	Ref(s).
2012	"Simple Song"	The Shins	Port of Morrow		check				
2012	"It's Only Life"	The Shins	Port of Morrow		check				
2012	"The Rifle's Spiral"	The Shins	Port of Morrow		check				
2012	"Bait and Switch"	The Shins	Port of Morrow		check				
2012	"September"	The Shins	Port of Morrow		check				
2012	"No Way Down"	The Shins	Port of Morrow		check				
2012	"For a Fool"	The Shins	Port of Morrow		check				
2012	"Fall of '82"	The Shins	Port of Morrow		check				
2012	"40 Mark Strasse"	The Shins	Port of Morrow		check				
2012	"Port of Morrow"	The Shins	Port of Morrow		check				
2012	"Pariah King"	The Shins	Port of Morrow		check				
2012	"The Waltz is Over"	The Shins	Port of Morrow		check				
2012	"God from the Machine"	Santigold	Master of My Make-Believe	check	check				
2012	"The Riot's Gone"	Santigold	Master of My Make-Believe	check	check				
2012	"The Keepers"	Santigold	Master of My Make-Believe	check	check				
2012	"Starring Role"	Marina and the Diamonds	Electra Heart	check	check				
2012	"Power & Control"	Marina and the Diamonds	Electra Heart		check				
2012	"Living Dead"	Marina and the Diamonds	Electra Heart	check	check				
2012	"Sex Yeah"	Marina and the Diamonds	Electra Heart	check	check				
2012	"The Shallow End"	Sam Sparro	Return to Paradise	check	check				
2012	"Red Lips"	Sky Ferreira	Ghost EP	check	check				
2012	"Radioactive"	Rita Ora	Ora	check	check				
2012	"Try"	P!nk	The Truth About Love		check				
2012	"True Love" (featuring Lily Allen)	P!nk	The Truth About Love	check	check				
2012	"How Come You're Not Here"	P!nk	The Truth About Love	check	check				
2012	"Walk of Shame"	P!nk	The Truth About Love	check	check				
2012	"Timebomb"	P!nk	The Truth About Love	check	check				
2012	"Blow Me (One Last Kiss)"	P!nk	The Truth About Love	check	check				
2012	"Youngblood"	3OH!3	Omens	check	check				
2012	"People Like Us"	Kelly Clarkson	Greatest Hits - Chapter One		check				
2012	"Love into the Light"	Kesha	Warrior		check				
2013	"Closer"	Tegan and Sara	Heartthrob	check	check				
2013	"Goodbye, Goodbye"	Tegan and Sara	Heartthrob		check				
2013	"I Was a Fool"	Tegan and Sara	Heartthrob		check				
2013	"I'm Not Your Hero"	Tegan and Sara	Heartthrob		check				
2013	"I Couldn't Be Your Friend"	Tegan and Sara	Heartthrob		check				
2013	"Love They Say"	Tegan and Sara	Heartthrob		check				
2013	"Now I'm All Messed Up"	Tegan and Sara	Heartthrob		check				
2013	"Shock to Your System"	Tegan and Sara	Heartthrob		check				
2013	"End of Night"	Dido	Girl Who Got Away	check	check				
2013	"Happy New Year"	Dido	Girl Who Got Away	check	check				
2013	"Let's Runaway"	Dido	Girl Who Got Away	check	check				
2013	"It Won't Let You Go"	Andrew Wyatt	Descender					check	
2013	"The Hands I Hold"	Bo Bruce	Before I Sleep	check	check				
2013	"Back to Life"	3OH!3	Omens	check	check				
2013	"The World Smiles"	Court Yard Hounds	Amelita	check					
2013	"Watch Your Step"	Court Yard Hounds	Amelita	check					
2013	"Burn"	Ellie Goulding	Halcyon Days	check	check				
2013	"Goodness Gracious"	Ellie Goulding	Halcyon Days	check	check				
2013	"Elastic Heart" (featuring The Weeknd and Diplo)	Sia	The Hunger Games: Catching; Fire OST		check				
2013	"Can't Take It Back"	Lissie	Back to Forever	check					
2013	"Double Rainbow"	Katy Perry	Prism	check	check				
2013	"Spiritual"	Katy Perry	Prism	check	check				
2013	"Wrapped in Red"	Kelly Clarkson	Wrapped in Red		check				
2013	"Underneath the Tree"	Kelly Clarkson	Wrapped in Red	check	check				
2013	"Have Yourself a Merry Little Christmas"	Kelly Clarkson	Wrapped in Red		check				
2013	"Run Run Rudolph"	Kelly Clarkson	Wrapped in Red		check				
2013	"Please Come Home for Christmas (Bells Will Be Ringing)"	Kelly Clarkson	Wrapped in Red		check				
2013	"Every Christmas"	Kelly Clarkson	Wrapped in Red		check				
2013	"Blue Christmas"	Kelly Clarkson	Wrapped in Red		check				
2013	"Baby, It's Cold Outside" (featuring Ronnie Dunn)	Kelly Clarkson	Wrapped in Red		check				
2013	"Winter Dreams (Brandon's Song)"	Kelly Clarkson	Wrapped in Red		check				
2013	"White Christmas"	Kelly Clarkson	Wrapped in Red		check				
2013	"My Favourite Things"	Kelly Clarkson	Wrapped in Red		check				
2013	"4 Carats"	Kelly Clarkson	Wrapped in Red	check	check				
2013	"Just for Now"	Kelly Clarkson	Wrapped in Red		check				
2013	"Silent Night" (featuring Reba and Trisha Yearwood)	Kelly Clarkson	Wrapped in Red		check				
2013	"I'll Be Home for Christmas"	Kelly Clarkson	Wrapped in Red		check				
2013	"Oh Come, Oh Come, Emmanuel"	Kelly Clarkson	Wrapped in Red		check				
2013	"NYC"	Dido	Greatest Hits	check	check				
2013	"Battle Cry" (featuring Sia)	Angel Haze	Dirty Gold	check	check				
2013	"Dirty Gold"	Angel Haze	Dirty Gold	check	check				
2014	"Ten Feet Tall" (featuring Wrabel)	Afrojack	Forget the World		check				
2014	"Are You What You Want to Be?"	Foster the People	Supermodel	check					
2014	"Ask Yourself"	Foster the People	Supermodel	check					
2014	"Sleeping with the Enemy"	Kylie Minogue	Kiss Me Once	check	check				
2014	"Spotlight"	Shakira	Shakira		check				
2014	"Chasing Shadows"	Shakira	Shakira	check	check				
2014	"Beating Heart"	Ellie Goulding	Divergent OST		check				
2014	"Silverline"	Lykke Li	I Never Learn	check					
2014	"Gunshot"	Lykke Li	I Never Learn		check				
2014	"Sleeping Alone"	Lykke Li	I Never Learn		check				
2014	"L8 CMMR"	Lily Allen	Sheezus	check	check				
2014	"Hard out Here"	Lily Allen	Sheezus	check	check				
2014	"Our Time"	Lily Allen	Sheezus	check	check				
2014	"Insincerely Yours"	Lily Allen	Sheezus	check	check				
2014	"Take My Place"	Lily Allen	Sheezus	check	check				
2014	"As Long as I Got You"	Lily Allen	Sheezus	check	check				
2014	"Close Your Eyes"	Lily Allen	Sheezus	check	check				
2014	"URL Badman"	Lily Allen	Sheezus	check	check				
2014	"Silver Spoon"	Lily Allen	Sheezus	check	check				
2014	"Life for Me"	Lily Allen	Sheezus	check	check				
2014	"Wind Your Neck In?"	Lily Allen	Sheezus	check	check				
2014	"NYC Loves You"	White Sea	In Cold Blood	check		check			
2014	"Flash"	White Sea	In Cold Blood	check		check			
2014	"Rollercoaster"	Bleachers	Strange Desire		check				
2014	"Money Power Glory"	Lana Del Rey	Ultraviolence	check	check				
2014	"Big Girls Cry"	Sia	1000 Forms of Fear		check				
2014	"Chandelier"	Sia	1000 Forms of Fear		check				
2014	"Burn the Pages"	Sia	1000 Forms of Fear	check	check				
2014	"Eye of the Needle"	Sia	1000 Forms of Fear		check				
2014	"Hostage"	Sia	1000 Forms of Fear		check				
2014	"Straight for the Knife"	Sia	1000 Forms of Fear		check				
2014	"Fair Game"	Sia	1000 Forms of Fear		check				
2014	"Elastic Heart"	Sia	1000 Forms of Fear			check			
2014	"Free the Animal"	Sia	1000 Forms of Fear	check	check				
2014	"Fire Meet Gasoline"	Sia	1000 Forms of Fear	check	check				
2014	"Cellophane"	Sia	1000 Forms of Fear	check	check				
2014	"Dressed in Black"	Sia	1000 Forms of Fear	check	check				
2014	"Smile"	Mikky Ekko	Time	check					
2014	"The Bridge"	Train	Bulletproof Picasso	check	check				
2014	"Can't Break Me Down"	Billy Idol	Kings & Queens of the Underground	check	check				
2014	"Save Me Now"	Billy Idol	Kings & Queens of the Underground	check	check				
2014	"You're Never Fully Dressed Without a Smile"	Sia	Annie OST	check	check				
2014	"I Wish You Would"	Taylor Swift	1989				check		
2014	"Firecracker"	Cheryl	Only Human	check	check				
2014	"Sweet Kisses"	Namie Amuro	Non-album single	check					
2014	"These Days"	Take That	III		check				
2014	"Overture"	Cast of Annie	Annie OST		check				
2014	"Maybe" (with Zoe Colletti, Nicolette Pierini, Eden Duncan-Smith and Amanda Troya)	Quvenzhané Wallis	Annie OST		check				
2014	"It's the Hard Knock Life" (with Zoe Colletti, Nicolette Pierini, Eden Duncan-Smith and Amanda Troya)	Quvenzhané Wallis	Annie OST		check				
2014	"Tomorrow"	Quvenzhané Wallis	Annie OST		check				
2014	"I Think I'm Gonna Like it Here" (with Rose Byrne and Stephanie Kurtzuba)	Quvenzhané Wallis	Annie OST	check	check				
2014	"Moonquake Lake" (with Beck)	Sia	Annie OST	check	check				
2014	"Little Girls"	Cameron Diaz	Annie OST	check	check				
2014	"Opportunity"	Quvenzhané Wallis	Annie OST	check	check				
2014	"Easy Street" (with Bobby Cannavale)	Cameron Diaz	Annie OST	check	check				
2014	"Who Am I?" (with Cameron Diaz and Quvenzhané Wallis)	Jamie Foxx	Annie OST	check	check				
2014	"I Don't Need Anything But You" (with Quvenzhané Wallis and Ross Byrne)	Jamie Foxx	Annie OST	check	check				
2014	"Tomorrow" (Reprise)	Cast of Annie	Annie OST		check				
2014	"Opportunity"	Sia	Annie OST	check	check				
2014	"Standing on the Sun" (featuring Mr. Vegas)	Beyoncé	Beyoncé: Platinum Edition	check	check				
2014	"If You Want It"	Take That	III	check	check				
2014	"Freeze"	Take That	III		check				
2014	"Famous"	Charli XCX	Sucker	check	check				
2015	"Ignition/Do You..."	Phoebe Ryan	Mine EP	check					
2015	"Heartbeat Song"	Kelly Clarkson	Piece by Piece		check				
2015	"Someone"	Kelly Clarkson	Piece by Piece		check				
2015	"Piece by Piece"	Kelly Clarkson	Piece by Piece	check	check				
2015	"I Had a Dream"	Kelly Clarkson	Piece by Piece	check	check				
2015	"Let Your Tears Fall"	Kelly Clarkson	Piece by Piece	check	check				
2015	"Tightrope"	Kelly Clarkson	Piece by Piece	check	check				
2015	"Dance with Me"	Kelly Clarkson	Piece by Piece		check				
2015	"Bad Reputation"	Kelly Clarkson	Piece by Piece	check	check				
2015	"Flashlight"	Jessie J	Pitch Perfect 2 OST		check				
2015	"I Want It All"	Bonnie McKee	Bombastic EP	check					
2015	"Dreams"	Beck	Colors	check	check				
2015	"Boy Problems"	Carly Rae Jepsen	Emotion	check	check				
2015	"Shine"	Years & Years	Communion	check					
2015	"Come and Get It"	John Newman	Revolve	check	check				
2015	"Tiring Game" (featuring Charlie Wilson)	John Newman	Revolve		check				
2015	"Today's the Day"	P!nk	Non-album single	check	check				
2015	"Hey Boy"	Take That	III (2015 Edition)		check				
2015	"Lights Down"	John Newman	Revolve	check	check				
2015	"Never Give Up"	John Newman	Revolve	check	check				
2015	"Killing Me"	John Newman	Revolve	check	check				
2015	"Bird Set Free"	Sia	This Is Acting	check	check				
2015	"Aftertaste"	Ellie Goulding	Delirium	check	check				
2015	"Something in the Way You Move"	Ellie Goulding	Delirium	check	check				
2015	"Around U"	Ellie Goulding	Delirium		check				
2015	"Holding on for Life"	Ellie Goulding	Delirium	check	check				
2015	"Don't Panic"	Ellie Goulding	Delirium	check	check				
2015	"We Can't Move to This"	Ellie Goulding	Delirium	check			check		
2015	"Scream It Out"	Ellie Goulding	Delirium		check				
2015	"Paradise"	Ellie Goulding	Delirium		check				
2015	"Hello"	Adele	25	check	check				
2015	"Water Under the Bridge"	Adele	25	check	check				
2015	"Million Years Ago"	Adele	25	check	check				
2016	"Cheap Thrills" (solo / featuring Sean Paul)	Sia	This Is Acting	check	check				
2016	"Move Your Body"	Sia	This Is Acting	check	check				
2016	"Sweet Design"	Sia	This Is Acting	check	check				
2016	"You're My Favourite"	Gwen Stefani	This Is What the Truth Feels Like	check	check				
2016	"Where Would I Be?"	Gwen Stefani	This Is What the Truth Feels Like	check	check				
2016	"Send Me a Picture"	Gwen Stefani	This Is What the Truth Feels Like	check	check				
2016	"Rare"	Gwen Stefani	This Is What the Truth Feels Like	check	check				
2016	"Here's to Us"	Ellie Goulding	Girls, Vol 3 OST	check	check				
2016	"Explode"	Charli XCX	The Angry Birds Movie OST	check	check				
2016	"What's It Gonna Be?"	Shura	Nothing's Real	check	check				
2016	"Boyfriend"	Tegan and Sara	Love You to Death	check	check				
2016	"That Girl"	Tegan and Sara	Love You to Death		check				
2016	"Faint of Heart"	Tegan and Sara	Love You to Death		check				
2016	"Dying to Know"	Tegan and Sara	Love You to Death	check	check				
2016	"Stop Desire"	Tegan and Sara	Love You to Death		check				
2016	"White Knuckles"	Tegan and Sara	Love You to Death		check				
2016	"100x"	Tegan and Sara	Love You to Death		check				
2016	"BWU"	Tegan and Sara	Love You to Death	check	check				
2016	"U-Turn"	Tegan and Sara	Love You to Death	check	check				
2016	"Hang On to the Night"	Tegan and Sara	Love You to Death		check				
2016	"Owen's Song"	The Lonely Island	Popstar: Never Stop Never; Stopping OST	check	check				
2016	"Tongue Tied"	Shura	Nothing's Real	check	check				
2016	"Wasted"	Dreezy	No Hard Feelings	check	check				
2016	"Say It Again"	Frances	Things I've Never Said	check	check				
2016	"Higher"	Carly Rae Jepsen	Emotion: Side B	check	check				
2016	"The Greatest" (solo / featuring Kendrick Lamar)	Sia	This Is Acting	check	check				
2016	"Up All Night"	Beck	Colors	check	check				
2016	"This Town"	Niall Horan	Flicker		check				
2016	"Penthouse Floor" (featuring Chance the Rapper)	John Legend	Darkness and Light	check					
2016	"Never Give Up"	Sia	Lion OST	check	check				
2016	"Angel By the Wings"	Sia	The Eagle Huntress OST	check	check				
2016	"Rock the Boat"	Momoiro Clover Z	Hakkin no Yoake	check					
2017	"Living Out Loud" (featuring Sia)	Brooke Candy	Non-album single	check					
2017	"Don't Take the Money"	Bleachers	Gone Now			check			
2017	"Love" (featuring Zakari)	Kendrick Lamar	Damn	check	check				
2017	"Hate That You Know Me"	Bleachers	Gone Now			check			
2017	"Wall of Glass"	Liam Gallagher	As You Were	check	check				
2017	"Run"	Foo Fighters	Concrete and Gold		check				
2017	"I Miss Those Days"	Bleachers	Gone Now				check		
2017	"Strangers" (featuring Lauren Jauregui)	Halsey	Hopeless Fountain Kingdom	check	check				
2017	"Heaven in Hiding"	Halsey	Hopeless Fountain Kingdom	check	check				
2017	"Sorry"	Halsey	Hopeless Fountain Kingdom	check	check				
2017	"Angel on Fire"	Halsey	Hopeless Fountain Kingdom	check	check				
2017	"Devil in Me"	Halsey	Hopeless Fountain Kingdom	check	check				
2017	"Everyone Else"	London Grammar	Truth Is a Beautiful Thing	check	check				
2017	"Leave the War with Me"	London Grammar	Truth Is a Beautiful Thing	check	check				
2017	"The Sky Is a Neighbourhood"	Foo Fighters	Concrete and Gold		check				
2017	"Dear Life"	Beck	Colors	check	check				
2017	"Dusk Till Dawn" (featuring Sia)	Zayn	Icarus Falls	check	check				
2017	"T-Shirt"	Foo Fighters	Concrete and Gold		check				
2017	"Make It Right"	Foo Fighters	Concrete and Gold		check				
2017	"La Dee Da"	Foo Fighters	Concrete and Gold		check				
2017	"Dirty Water"	Foo Fighters	Concrete and Gold		check				
2017	"Arrows"	Foo Fighters	Concrete and Gold		check				
2017	"Happy Ever After (Zero Hour)"	Foo Fighters	Concrete and Gold		check				
2017	"Sunday Rain"	Foo Fighters	Concrete and Gold		check				
2017	"The Line"	Foo Fighters	Concrete and Gold		check				
2017	"Concrete and Gold"	Foo Fighters	Concrete and Gold		check				
2017	"Too Much to Ask"	Niall Horan	Flicker		check				
2017	"Since We're Alone"	Niall Horan	Flicker	check	check				
2017	"Paper Crown"	Liam Gallagher	As You Were		check				
2017	"Come Back to Me"	Liam Gallagher	As You Were	check	check				
2017	"Doesn't Have to Be That Way"	Liam Gallagher	As You Were	check	check				
2017	"Colors"	Beck	Colors	check	check				
2017	"Seventh Heaven"	Beck	Colors	check	check				
2017	"I'm So Free"	Beck	Colors	check	check				
2017	"No Distraction"	Beck	Colors	check	check				
2017	"Square One"	Beck	Colors	check	check				
2017	"But We Lost It"	P!nk	Beautiful Trauma	check	check				
2017	"Where We Go"	P!nk	Beautiful Trauma	check	check				
2017	"Would You Call That Love"	Kelly Clarkson	Meaning of Life	check	check				
2017	"Santa's Coming for Us"	Sia	Everyday Is Christmas	check	check				
2017	"Candy Cane Lane"	Sia	Everyday Is Christmas	check	check				
2017	"Snowman"	Sia	Everyday Is Christmas	check	check				
2017	"Snowflake"	Sia	Everyday Is Christmas	check	check				
2017	"Ho Ho Ho"	Sia	Everyday Is Christmas	check	check				
2017	"Puppies are Forever"	Sia	Everyday Is Christmas	check	check				
2017	"Sunshine"	Sia	Everyday Is Christmas	check	check				
2017	"Underneath the Mistletoe"	Sia	Everyday Is Christmas	check	check				
2017	"Everyday is Christmas"	Sia	Everyday Is Christmas	check	check				
2017	"Underneath the Christmas Lights"	Sia	Everyday Is Christmas	check	check				

=== 2018 to 2026 ===
Year	Title	Artist	Album	Songwriter	Producer				Ref(s).
Year	Title	Artist	Album	Songwriter	Primary	Secondary	Additional	Vocal	Ref(s).
2018	"Get Out"	Chvrches	Love Is Dead	check	check				
2018	"I Promise You"	James Corden	Peter Rabbit OST		check				
2018	"Never Say Die"	Chvrches	Love Is Dead	check	check				
2018	"Your Song"	Lady Gaga	Revamp		check				
2018	"Coming Home"	Kali Uchis	Isolation	check	check				
2018	"Graffiti"	Chvrches	Love Is Dead	check	check				
2018	"Deliverance"	Chvrches	Love Is Dead	check	check				
2018	"Forever"	Chvrches	Love Is Dead	check	check				
2018	"Graves"	Chvrches	Love Is Dead	check	check				
2018	"Heaven/Hell"	Chvrches	Love Is Dead	check	check				
2018	"ii"	Chvrches	Love Is Dead	check	check				
2018	"Wonderland"	Chvrches	Love Is Dead	check	check				
2018	"I Don't Know"	Paul McCartney	Egypt Station		check				
2018	"Come On to Me"	Paul McCartney	Egypt Station		check				
2018	"All for You"	Years & Years	Palo Santo	check	check				
2018	"Hallelujah"	Years & Years	Palo Santo	check	check				
2018	"Up in Flames"	Years & Years	Palo Santo	check	check				
2018	"Give a Little"	Maggie Rogers	Heard It in a Past Life	check	check				
2018	"Opening Station"	Paul McCartney	Egypt Station		check				
2018	"Happy with You"	Paul McCartney	Egypt Station		check				
2018	"Who Cares"	Paul McCartney	Egypt Station		check				
2018	"Confidante"	Paul McCartney	Egypt Station		check				
2018	"People Want Peace"	Paul McCartney	Egypt Station		check				
2018	"Hand in Hand"	Paul McCartney	Egypt Station		check				
2018	"Dominoes"	Paul McCartney	Egypt Station		check				
2018	"Back in Brazil"	Paul McCartney	Egypt Station		check				
2018	"Do It Now"	Paul McCartney	Egypt Station		check				
2018	"Caesar Rock"	Paul McCartney	Egypt Station		check				
2018	"Despite Repeated Warnings"	Paul McCartney	Egypt Station		check				
2018	"Station II"	Paul McCartney	Egypt Station		check				
2018	"Hunt You Down/Naked/C-Link"	Paul McCartney	Egypt Station		check				
2018	"Get Started"	Paul McCartney	Egypt Station		check				
2018	"Frank Sinatra's Party"	Paul McCartney	Egypt Station		check				
2018	"Sixty Second Street"	Paul McCartney	Egypt Station		check				
2018	"Light On"	Maggie Rogers	Heard It in a Past Life		check				
2018	"Baby Outlaw"	Elle King	Shake the Spirit	check	check				
2018	"Runaway"	Elle King	Shake the Spirit	check	check				
2018	"Round and Round"	Sia	Everyday Is Christmas		check				
2018	"Sing for My Life"	Sia	Everyday Is Christmas	check	check				
2018	"My Old Santa Claus"	Sia	Everyday Is Christmas	check	check				
2018	"Fortress"	Lennon Stella	Love, Me	check	check				
2018	"Wrapped Up"	Natalie Portman	Vox Lux OST	check	check				
2018	"Wrapped Up"	Raffey Cassidy	Vox Lux OST	check	check				
2018	"Anthem"	Scott Walker	Vox Lux OST	check	check				
2019	"Girl"	Maren Morris	Girl	check	check				
2019	"Overnight"	Maggie Rogers	Heard It In a Past Life	check	check				
2019	"The Knife"	Maggie Rogers	Heard It In a Past Life	check	check				
2019	"Retrograde"	Maggie Rogers	Heard It In a Past Life	check	check				
2019	"Back in My Body"	Maggie Rogers	Heard It In a Past Life		check				
2019	"Common" (featuring Brandi Carlile)	Maren Morris	Girl	check	check				
2019	"Preach"	John Legend	Non-album single	check	check				
2019	"The Bones"	Maren Morris	Girl		check				
2019	"You Mean the World to Me"	Freya Ridings	Freya Ridings		check				
2019	"Lovely"	Billy Raffoul	Non-album single		check				
2019	"Courage"	P!nk	Hurts 2B Human	check	check				
2019	"We Could Have It All"	P!nk	Hurts 2B Human	check	check				
2019	"Circle Game"	P!nk	Hurts 2B Human	check	check				
2019	"Shockwave"	Liam Gallagher	Why Me? Why Not.	check	check				
2019	"I Believe"	Jonas Brothers	Happiness Begins	check	check				
2019	"Every Single Time"	Jonas Brothers	Happiness Begins	check	check				
2019	"Don't Throw It Away"	Jonas Brothers	Happiness Begins	check	check				
2019	"Strangers"	Jonas Brothers	Happiness Begins	check	check				
2019	"Never Too Late"	Elton John	The Lion King OST		check				
2019	"(I'm Gonna) Love Me Again"	Elton John and Taron Egerton	Rocketman: Music from the Motion Picture		check				
2019	"Halo"	Liam Gallagher	Why Me? Why Not.	check	check				
2019	"Be Still"	Liam Gallagher	Why Me? Why Not.	check	check				
2019	"Meadow"	Liam Gallagher	Why Me? Why Not.	check	check				
2019	"Baby"	Celine Dion	Courage	check	check				
2019	"Heart of Glass"	Celine Dion	Courage	check	check				
2019	"Home Tonight"	Paul McCartney	Non-album single		check				
2019	"In a Hurry"	Paul McCartney	Non-album single		check				
2019	"See Through"	Beck	Hyperspace	check	check				
2019	"Sunflower, Vol. 6"	Harry Styles	Fine Line	check	check				
2020	"You Should Be Sad"	Halsey	Manic	check	check				
2020	"3AM"	Halsey	Manic	check	check				
2020	"Finally // Beautiful Stranger"	Halsey	Manic	check	check				
2020	"Arms of a Stranger"	Niall Horan	Heartbreak Weather		check				
2020	"New Angel"	Niall Horan	Heartbreak Weather	check	check				
2020	"Dress"	Niall Horan	Heartbreak Weather	check	check				
2020	"Worst Enemy"	Evie Irie	Non-album single	check	check				
2020	"Saved My Life"	Sia	Music – Songs from and Inspired by the Motion Picture	check	check				
2020	"Love Myself"	Tracee Ellis Ross	The High Note OST	check					
2020	"Takes Two"	Maren Morris	Girl: Deluxe Edition	check	check				
2020	"Daylight" (with Diplo)	Joji	Nectar	check	check				
2020	"What the Future Holds"	Steps	What the Future Holds	check					
2020	"Courage to Change"	Sia	Music – Songs from and Inspired by the Motion Picture	check	check				
2020	"Better Than We Found It"	Maren Morris	Non-album single		check				
2020	"Show Them the Way"	Stevie Nicks	TBA	check	check				
2020	"My Way, Soon"	Greta Van Fleet	The Battle at Garden's Gate		check				
2020	"Shame Shame"	Foo Fighters	Medicine at Midnight		check				
2020	"Age of Machine"	Greta Van Fleet	The Battle at Garden's Gate		check				
2020	"No Son of Mine"	Foo Fighters	Medicine at Midnight		check				
2021	"Making a Fire"	Foo Fighters	Medicine at Midnight		check				
2021	"Cloudspotter"	Foo Fighters	Medicine at Midnight		check				
2021	"Waiting on a War"	Foo Fighters	Medicine at Midnight		check				
2021	"Medicine at Midnight"	Foo Fighters	Medicine at Midnight		check				
2021	"Holding Poison"	Foo Fighters	Medicine at Midnight		check				
2021	"Chasing Birds"	Foo Fighters	Medicine at Midnight		check				
2021	"Love Dies Young"	Foo Fighters	Medicine at Midnight		check				
2021	"Floating Through Space"	Sia and David Guetta	Music – Songs from and Inspired by the Motion Picture	check	check				
2021	"Spaceman"	Nick Jonas	Spaceman	check	check				
2021	"Saturday"	Twenty One Pilots	Scaled and Icy		check				
2021	"I Save Me"	Maren Morris	Diane Warren: The Cave Sessions, Volume 1		check				
2021	"Clockwork"	Alessia Cara	In the Meantime	check	check				
2021	"The Tradition"	Halsey	If I Can't Have Love, I Want Power	check				check	
2021	"You Asked For This"	Halsey	If I Can't Have Love, I Want Power		check			check	
2021	"Wish I Loved You in the 90s"	Tate McRae	Too Young to Be Sad	check	check				
2021	"Easy on Me"	Adele	30	check	check				
2021	"Oh My God"	Adele	30	check	check				
2021	"My Little Love"	Adele	30	check	check				
2021	"Cry Your Heart Out"	Adele	30	check	check				
2021	"I Drink Wine"	Adele	30	check	check				
2021	"Can't Be Together"	Adele	Bonus track	check	check				
2022	"Circles Around This Town"	Maren Morris	Humble Quest		check				
2022	"The Furthest Thing"	Maren Morris	Humble Quest	check	check				
2022	"I Can't Love You Anymore"	Maren Morris	Humble Quest	check	check				
2022	"Humble Quest"	Maren Morris	Humble Quest		check				
2022	"Background Music"	Maren Morris	Humble Quest		check				
2022	"Nervous"	Maren Morris	Humble Quest		check				
2022	"Tall Guys"	Maren Morris	Humble Quest		check				
2022	"Detour"	Maren Morris	Humble Quest	check	check				
2022	"Hummingbird"	Maren Morris	Humble Quest		check				
2022	"Good Friends"	Maren Morris	Humble Quest	check	check				
2022	"What Would This World Do?"	Maren Morris	Humble Quest		check				
2022	"Nightfalls"	Keith Urban	Non-album single	check	check				
2022	"Demigod"	KT Tunstall	Nut	check					
2022	"Everything's Electric"	Liam Gallagher	Come on You Know	check	check				
2022	"Better Days"	Liam Gallagher	Come on You Know		check				
2022	"She's All I Wanna Be"	Tate McRae	I Used to Think I Could Fly	check	check				
2022	"Chaotic"	Tate McRae		check	check				
2022	"Tiptoeing"	Hope Tala	Non-album single	check	check				
2022	"Leave it on the Dancefloor"	Hope Tala	Non-album single	check	check				
2022	"Stayed at the Party"	Hope Tala	Non-album single	check	check				
2022	"For What It's Worth"	Stevie Nicks	Non-album single	check					
2023	"Cracker Island" (featuring Thundercat)	Gorillaz	Cracker Island	check	check				
2023	"Oil" (featuring Stevie Nicks)	Gorillaz	Cracker Island	check	check				
2023	"The Tired Influencer"	Gorillaz	Cracker Island	check	check				
2023	"Tarantula"	Gorillaz	Cracker Island	check	check				
2023	"Silent Running" (featuring Adeleye Omotayo)	Gorillaz	Cracker Island	check	check				
2023	"New Gold" (featuring Tame Impala and Bootie Brown)	Gorillaz	Cracker Island	check	check				
2023	"Baby Queen"	Gorillaz	Cracker Island	check	check				
2023	"Skinny Ape"	Gorillaz	Cracker Island	check	check				
2023	"Possession Island" (featuring Beck)	Gorillaz	Cracker Island	check	check				
2023	"Love Goes On"	Ellie Goulding	Higher Than Heaven	check					
2023	"Just for You"	Ellie Goulding	Higher Than Heaven	check					
2023	"Easy Lover" (featuring Big Sean)	Ellie Goulding	Higher Than Heaven	check	check				
2023	"Intuition"	Ellie Goulding	Higher Than Heaven (Deluxe Edition)	check					
2023	"Jaded"	Miley Cyrus	Endless Summer Vacation	check	check				
2023	"Winner"	Conan Gray	Found Heaven	check	check				
2023	"Hass Hass"	Diljit Dosanjh and Sia	TBA	check	check				
2023	"Another Life"(featuring Rema)	PinkPantheress	Heaven Knows	check	check				
2023	"True Romance"	PinkPantheress	Heaven Knows	check	check				
2023	"Mosquito"	PinkPantheress	Heaven Knows	check	check				
2024	"Immortal Queen" (featuring Chaka Khan)	Sia	Reasonable Woman	check	check				
2024	"I Forgive You"	Sia	Reasonable Woman	check	check				
2024	"Wanna Be Known"	Sia	Reasonable Woman	check	check				
2024	"Fame Won't Love You" (with Paris Hilton)	Sia	Reasonable Woman	check	check				
2024	"Alley Rose"	Conan Gray	Found Heaven	check	check				
2024	"Forever With Me"	Conan Gray	Found Heaven	check	check				
2024	"Dance All Night"	Rosé	Rosie	check	check				
2024	"Sunday Best"	Lauren Mayberry	Vicious Creature	check	check				
2024	"Dog Years"	Halsey	The Great Impersonator	check	check				
2024	"Ego"	Halsey	The Great Impersonator	check	check				
2024	"Lessons"	Halsey	The Great Impersonator	check	check				
2024	"Highjack" (featuring Jessica Pratt)	A$AP Rocky	Non-album single		check				
2024	"Did Me a Favor"	Sia	Reasonable Woman	check	check				
2024	Liam Gallagher John Squire	Liam Gallagher and John Squire	Liam Gallagher John Squire		check				
2025	"You"	Fujii Kaze	Prema		check				
2025	"Left Alone"	Alessia Cara	Love & Hyperbole	check	check				
2025	"Carry Me Through"	Maren Morris	Dreamsicle	check	check				
2025	The Clearing	Wolf Alice	The Clearing		check				
2025	"Thorns"	Wolf Alice	The Clearing	check	check				
2025	"Just Two Girls"	Wolf Alice	The Clearing	check	check				
2025	"The Sofa"	Wolf Alice	The Clearing	check	check				
2025	"Dreams"	Jade Bird	Who Wants to Talk About Love?	check	check				
2025	"I Wish I Didn't Waste Your Time"	Thundercat	Distracted	check	check				
2025	"Wildflowers and Wine"	Jessie Murph	Sex Hysteria (deluxe edition)	check	check				
2026	Distracted	Thundercat	Distracted		check				
2026	"She Knows Too Much" (featuring Mac Miller)	Thundercat	Distracted		check				
2026	"Air Force (Black DiMarco)"	ASAP Rocky	Don't Be Dumb			check			

== Songs written and produced as part of an ensemble ==
Key
†	Indicates produced song only

List of songs produced by Greg Kurstin as part of an ensemble act
Year	Song	Ensemble	Release	Ref.
1994	"Last Word (The One For Her)"	Geggy Tah	Grand Opening	
1994	"Go"	Geggy Tah	Grand Opening	
1994	"L.A. Lujah"	Geggy Tah	Grand Opening	
1994	"Giddy Up"	Geggy Tah	Grand Opening	
1994	"P. Sluff"	Geggy Tah	Grand Opening	
1994	"Tucked In"	Geggy Tah	Grand Opening	
1994	"Fasterthan..."	Geggy Tah	Grand Opening	
1994	"Who's In A Hurry?"	Geggy Tah	Grand Opening	
1994	"Intro"	Geggy Tah	Grand Opening	
1994	"Ovary Z's"	Geggy Tah	Grand Opening	
1994	"Bomb Fishing"	Geggy Tah	Grand Opening	
1994	"Crack Of Dawn"	Geggy Tah	Grand Opening	
1994	"(Ghost Of P- Sluff)"	Geggy Tah	Grand Opening	
1994	"Welcome Into The World (Birthday Song)"	Geggy Tah	Grand Opening	
1996	"Granddad's Opening Address"	Geggy Tah	Sacred Cow	
1996	"Whoever You Are"	Geggy Tah	Sacred Cow	
1996	"Lotta Stuff" †	Geggy Tah	Sacred Cow	
1996	"Century Plant 2000"	Geggy Tah	Sacred Cow	
1996	"Sacred Cow" †	Geggy Tah	Sacred Cow	
1996	"House of Usher (Inside)" †	Geggy Tah	Sacred Cow	
1996	"Don't Close the Door"	Geggy Tah	Sacred Cow	
1996	"Such a Beautiful Night" †	Geggy Tah	Sacred Cow	
1996	"She Withers"	Geggy Tah	Sacred Cow	
1996	"Las Vegas with the Lights Out"	Geggy Tah	Sacred Cow	
1996	"Mem" †	Geggy Tah	Sacred Cow	
1996	"Shed" †	Geggy Tah	Sacred Cow	
1996	"Gina"	Geggy Tah	Sacred Cow	
2000	"Everybody Ready"	Action Figure Party	Action Figure Party	
2000	"Action Figure Party"	Action Figure Party	Action Figure Party	
2000	"Pong Baby"	Action Figure Party	Action Figure Party	
2000	"Gamera"	Action Figure Party	Action Figure Party	
2000	"No Sleep" †	Action Figure Party	Action Figure Party	
2000	"Clock Radio"	Action Figure Party	Action Figure Party	
2000	"Where's the Moment"	Action Figure Party	Action Figure Party	
2000	"George and Cindy"	Action Figure Party	Action Figure Party	
2000	"Gettem"	Action Figure Party	Action Figure Party	
2000	"Green"	Action Figure Party	Action Figure Party	
2000	"The Clapper"	Action Figure Party	Action Figure Party	
2000	"Flow"	Action Figure Party	Action Figure Party	
2001	"Goodnight to the Machine"	Geggy Tah	Into the Oh	
2001	"One Zero"	Geggy Tah	Into the Oh	
2001	"Dumb Submarine" †	Geggy Tah	Into the Oh	
2001	"Sweat"	Geggy Tah	Into the Oh	
2001	"Holly Oak" †	Geggy Tah	Into the Oh	
2001	"Space Heater"	Geggy Tah	Into the Oh	
2001	"Love Is Alone"	Geggy Tah	Into the Oh	
2001	"Special Someone"	Geggy Tah	Into the Oh	
2001	"I Forgot" †	Geggy Tah	Into the Oh	
2001	"Aliens Somewhere" †	Geggy Tah	Into the Oh	
2001	"I'll Find My Way"	Geggy Tah	Into the Oh	
2001	"Love Is in Love" †	Geggy Tah	Into the Oh	
2006	"Again & Again"	The Bird and the Bee	Again and Again and Again and Again	
2006	"I'm a Broken Heart"	The Bird and the Bee	Again and Again and Again and Again	
2006	"Fucking Boyfriend"	The Bird and the Bee	Again and Again and Again and Again	
2007	"Birds and the Bees"	The Bird and the Bee	The Bird and the Bee	
2007	"La La La"	The Bird and the Bee	The Bird and the Bee	
2007	"My Fair Lady"	The Bird and the Bee	The Bird and the Bee	
2007	"I Hate Camera"	The Bird and the Bee	The Bird and the Bee	
2007	"Because"	The Bird and the Bee	The Bird and the Bee	
2007	"Preparedness"	The Bird and the Bee	The Bird and the Bee	
2007	"Spark"	The Bird and the Bee	The Bird and the Bee	
2007	"Polite Dance Song"	The Bird and the Bee	Please Clap Your Hands	
2007	"Man"	The Bird and the Bee	Please Clap Your Hands	
2007	"The Races"	The Bird and the Bee	Please Clap Your Hands	
2007	"So You Say"	The Bird and the Bee	Please Clap Your Hands	
2007	"How Deep Is Your Love"	The Bird and the Bee	Please Clap Your Hands	
2007	"Carol of the Bells" †	The Bird and the Bee	Stockings by the Fire	
2008	"Birthday"	The Bird and the Bee	One Too Many Hearts	
2008	"Last Day of Our Love"	The Bird and the Bee	One Too Many Hearts	
2008	"Come as You Were"	The Bird and the Bee	One Too Many Hearts	
2008	"Tonight You Belong to Me" †	The Bird and the Bee	One Too Many Hearts	
2009	"Fanfare"	The Bird and the Bee	Ray Guns Are Not Just the Future	
2009	"My Love"	The Bird and the Bee	Ray Guns Are Not Just the Future	
2009	"Diamond Dave"	The Bird and the Bee	Ray Guns Are Not Just the Future	
2009	"What's in the Middle"	The Bird and the Bee	Ray Guns Are Not Just the Future	
2009	"Ray Gun"	The Bird and the Bee	Ray Guns Are Not Just the Future	
2009	"Love Letter to Japan"	The Bird and the Bee	Ray Guns Are Not Just the Future	
2009	"Meteor"	The Bird and the Bee	Ray Guns Are Not Just the Future	
2009	"Baby"	The Bird and the Bee	Ray Guns Are Not Just the Future	
2009	"Phil"	The Bird and the Bee	Ray Guns Are Not Just the Future	
2009	"You're a Cad"	The Bird and the Bee	Ray Guns Are Not Just the Future	
2009	"Witch"	The Bird and the Bee	Ray Guns Are Not Just the Future	
2009	"Lifespan of a Fly"	The Bird and the Bee	Ray Guns Are Not Just the Future	
2009	"Leggs"	The Bird and the Bee	Ray Guns Are Not Just the Future	
2009	"Everything Is Ending"	The Bird and the Bee	Ray Guns Are Not Just the Future	
2009	"Punch You in the Eye"	The Bird and the Bee	Ray Guns Are Not Just the Future	
2009	"Heart Throbs and Apple Seeds"	The Bird and the Bee	Ray Guns Are Not Just the Future	
2010	"Heard It on the Radio"	The Bird and the Bee	Interpreting the Masters Volume 1: A Tribute to Daryl Hall and John Oates	
2010	"I Can't Go for That" †	The Bird and the Bee	Interpreting the Masters Volume 1: A Tribute to Daryl Hall and John Oates	
2010	"Rich Girl" †	The Bird and the Bee	Interpreting the Masters Volume 1: A Tribute to Daryl Hall and John Oates	
2010	"Sara Smile" †	The Bird and the Bee	Interpreting the Masters Volume 1: A Tribute to Daryl Hall and John Oates	
2010	"Kiss on My List" †	The Bird and the Bee	Interpreting the Masters Volume 1: A Tribute to Daryl Hall and John Oates	
2010	"Maneater" †	The Bird and the Bee	Interpreting the Masters Volume 1: A Tribute to Daryl Hall and John Oates	
2010	"She's Gone" †	The Bird and the Bee	Interpreting the Masters Volume 1: A Tribute to Daryl Hall and John Oates	
2010	"Private Eyes" †	The Bird and the Bee	Interpreting the Masters Volume 1: A Tribute to Daryl Hall and John Oates	
2010	"One on One" †	The Bird and the Bee	Interpreting the Masters Volume 1: A Tribute to Daryl Hall and John Oates	
2010	"4th of July"	The Bird and the Bee	Interpreting the Masters Volume 1: A Tribute to Daryl Hall and John Oates	
2015	"Young and Dumb"	The Bird and the Bee	Recreational Love	
2015	"Recreational Love""	The Bird and the Bee	Recreational Love	
2015	"Will You Dance?"	The Bird and the Bee	Recreational Love	
2015	"Runaway"	The Bird and the Bee	Recreational Love	
2015	"Please Take Me Home"	The Bird and the Bee	Recreational Love	
2015	"Jenny"	The Bird and the Bee	Recreational Love	
2015	"Los Angeles"	The Bird and the Bee	Recreational Love	
2015	"Doctor"	The Bird and the Bee	Recreational Love	
2015	"We're Coming To You"	The Bird and the Bee	Recreational Love	
2015	"Lovey Dovey"	The Bird and the Bee	Recreational Love	
