= Again and Again =

Again and Again may refer to:

Albums

- Again and Again (Chick Corea album), a 1983 album by Chick Corea
- Again and Again (Oliver Lake album), a 1991 album
- Again & Again, a 2010 album by Thieves Like Us

Songs

- "Again & Again" (2PM song)
- "Again and Again" (Jewel song)
- "Again and Again" (Status Quo song)
- "Again & Again" (Taproot song)
- "Again & Again", a song by Fancy (singer)
- "Again & Again", a song by The Bird and the Bee from Again and Again and Again and Again
- "Again and Again", a song by Fireworks from All I Have to Offer Is My Own Confusion
- "Again and Again", a song by The Hospitals from The Hospitals
- "Again and Again", a song by Keane from Perfect Symmetry
- "Again & Again", a song by The Bird and The Bee from their self-titled album
- "Again and Again", a song by Bob Mould from District Line
- "Again and Again", a song by Basto from Live Tonight

== See also ==
- Again (disambiguation)
