= Ray Guns Are Not Just the Future =

Studio album by The Bird and the Bee
- Released: January 27, 2009
- Recorded: 2008; Echo Studios (Los Feliz, Los Angeles, California)
- Genre: Indie pop, electronic
- Length: 44:54
- Label: Blue Note
- Producer: Greg Kurstin

The Bird and the Bee chronology
One Too Many Hearts (2008)	Ray Guns Are Not Just the Future (2009)	Interpreting the Masters Volume 1: A Tribute to Daryl Hall and John Oates (2010)

Professional ratings
Aggregate scores
Source	Rating
Metacritic	71/100
Review scores
Source	Rating
Allmusic	3/5 stars
The A.V. Club	A−
Entertainment Weekly	A−
The Guardian	2/5 stars
Los Angeles Times	3/4 stars
Pitchfork Media	5.4/10
PopMatters	7/10
Rolling Stone	2/5 stars
Slant Magazine	3/5 stars
Spin	7/10

Ray Guns Are Not Just the Future is the second studio album by American indie pop duo The Bird and the Bee, released on January 27, 2009, by Blue Note Records. The album contains the two lead-off tracks from the duo's last two studio EPs: "Polite Dance Song" from Please Clap Your Hands and "Birthday" from One Too Many Hearts.

== Track listing ==
All tracks are written by Greg Kurstin and Inara George, except where noted.

No.	Title	Length
1.	"Fanfare"	0:29
2.	"My Love"	3:46
3.	"Diamond Dave"	3:14
4.	"What's in the Middle"	3:21
5.	"Ray Gun"	4:42
6.	"Love Letter to Japan"	4:07
7.	"Meteor"	3:21
8.	"Baby"	3:50
9.	"Phil"	0:10
10.	"Polite Dance Song"	3:47
11.	"You're a Cad"	3:10
12.	"Witch"	3:55
13.	"Birthday"	3:48
14.	"Lifespan of a Fly"	3:14

LP bonus track
No.	Title	Length
15.	"Leggs"	2:59

iTunes bonus tracks
No.	Title	Length
15.	"Everything Is Ending"	3:22
16.	"Polite Dance Song" (Totally Rude Remix) (pre-order only)	2:47

Napster bonus track
No.	Title	Length
15.	"Punch You in the Eye"	3:41

Japan bonus tracks
No.	Title	Length
15.	"Heart Throbs and Apple Seeds (with Cornelius)"	3:53
16.	"How Deep Is Your Love" (Barry Gibb, Maurice Gibb, Robin Gibb)	3:24

Korea bonus tracks
No.	Title	Length
15.	"How Deep Is Your Love" (B. Gibb, M. Gibb, R. Gibb)	3:24
16.	"Come as You Were"	3:00
17.	"Again & Again" (Hotel Room Bossanova Version)	2:47
18.	"Fucking Boyfriend" (Ralphi Rosario & Jody DB Radio Edit)	3:48

== Personnel ==
Credits for Ray Guns Are Not Just the Future adapted from liner notes.

The Bird and the Bee

- Greg Kurstin – bass, engineer, guitar, keyboards, mixing, percussion, producer, programming (all tracks); backing vocals (3, 4, 5)
- Inara George – vocals

Additional personnel

- Mike Andrews – guitar (4)
- Autumn de Wilde – photography
- Megan Geer-Alsop – backing vocals (10)
- Willow Geer-Alsop – backing vocals (4, 6, 10, 14)
- Perry Greenfield – artist development management
- Gordon H. Jee – creative director
- Keith Karwelies – A&R administration
- Carla Leighton – art direction, design
- Alex Lilly – backing vocals (4, 6, 10, 14)
- Gavin Lurssen – mastering
- Gus Seyffert – guitar (10)
- Kazumi Someya – translation (6)
- Joey Waronker – drums (1, 9, 10)
- Eli Wolf – A&R

== Charts ==
Chart (2009)	Peak position
Japanese Albums Chart	236
US Billboard 200	78
US Alternative Albums	20
