= The Hanukkah Sessions =

Video series featuring songs by Jewish musicians

The Hanukkah Sessions are a series of video presentations of popular songs originally written or performed by Jewish artists, as covered by musicians Greg Kurstin and Dave Grohl. Kurstin and Grohl covered eight songs per year for this project, and released one per night to digital streaming platforms for each night of Hanukkah in the years 2020 through 2022.

== Background ==
During the COVID-19 pandemic in 2020 and 2021, Kurstin (primarily playing keyboards) and Grohl (primarily playing drums) recorded those years' Hanukkah Sessions in Kurstin's home studio. During these times they occasionally featured other performers, such as Peaches singing "Fuck the Pain Away" with them remotely, and Grohl's daughter Violet singing a cover of Amy Winehouse's song "Take the Box".

In 2022, when pandemic conditions had eased, Kurstin and Grohl held a concert with various guests on December 5 at the Largo nightclub in Los Angeles. These guests included Inara George (Kurstin's bandmate from The Bird and the Bee), Beck, P!nk, Jack Black and Kyle Gass of Tenacious D, Karen O, and Grohl's daughter Violet. Director Judd Apatow collaborated with Kurstin and Grohl to make the 2022 edition of the Hanukkah Sessions a fundraiser for the Anti-Defamation League. The songs recorded at this concert were released to streaming platforms one at a time on each night of Hanukkah, in keeping with the pattern established the previous two years.

== Table of songs ==
Night of Hanukkah (with Gregorian calendar date and link to video)	Song	Original artist(s)	Comments	Citations
2020
1st (December 10, 2020)	"Sabotage"	Beastie Boys		
2nd (December 11, 2020)	"Hotline Bling"	Drake		
3rd (December 12, 2020)	"Mississippi Queen"	Leslie West of Mountain		
4th (December 13, 2020)	"Fuck the Pain Away"	Peaches	Performed (remotely) with vocals by Peaches	
5th (December 14, 2020)	"Rainy Day Women #12 & 35"	Bob Dylan		
6th (December 15, 2020)	"Connection"	Justine Frischmann of Elastica		
7th (December 16, 2020)	"Frustrated"	The Knack		
8th (December 17, 2020)	"Rock & Roll"	The Velvet Underground		
2021
1st (November 28, 2021)	"Stay (I Missed You)"	Lisa Loeb		
2nd (November 29, 2021)	"Blitzkrieg Bop"	Joey Ramone and Tommy Ramone of Ramones		
3rd (November 30, 2021)	"Copacabana"	Barry Manilow		
4th (December 1, 2021)	"Jump"	David Lee Roth of Van Halen		
5th (December 2, 2021)	"Take the Box"	Amy Winehouse	Performed with Violet Grohl	
6th (December 3, 2021)	"Big Shot"	Billy Joel		
7th (December 4, 2021)	"Train in Vain"	Mick Jones of The Clash		
8th (December 5, 2021)	"Rock and Roll All Nite"	Gene Simmons and Paul Stanley of Kiss		
2022
1st (December 18, 2022)	"Spinning Wheel"	Blood, Sweat & Tears	Performed with Judd Apatow; Apatow specifically referenced a version of the song as performed by the character Hank Kingsley on The Larry Sanders Show.	
2nd (December 19, 2022)	"Get the Party Started"	P!nk	Performed with P!nk	
3rd (December 20, 2022)	"The Things We Do for Love"	10cc	Performed with Inara George and backing vocals by Tenacious D	
4th (December 21, 2022)	"At Seventeen"	Janis Ian	Performed with Violet Grohl; Shortly thereafter Ian herself commented favorably on Violet Grohl's performance.	
5th (December 22, 2022)	"E-Pro"	Beck	Performed with Beck	
6th (December 23, 2022)	"Heads Will Roll"	Yeah Yeah Yeahs	Performed with Karen O	
7th (December 24, 2022)	"The Spirit of Radio"	Geddy Lee of Rush	Performed with Jack Black	
8th (December 25, 2022)	"We Love L.A."	Randy Newman	Performed with Karen O, Beck, Tenacious D, Inara George, and P!nk	
