= Annie (2014 film soundtrack) =

Soundtrack album by various artists
- Released: November 17, 2014
- Recorded: 2013
- Genre: Pop
- Label: Roc Nation; Overbrook; Madison Gate; RCA; Sony
- Producer: Greg Kurstin

Singles from Annie
- 1. "You're Never Fully Dressed Without a Smile (2014 Film Version)" Released: October 22, 2014; 2. "Opportunity" Released: January 19, 2015 (Note: The version recorded by Sia was released to US hot adult contemporary radio on January 19, 2015.)

Annie is a soundtrack to the 2014 film of the same name, released by Roc Nation, Overbrook Entertainment, Madison Gate Records and RCA Records on November 17, 2014. The soundtrack's executive producer was Greg Kurstin, who also collaborated with Sia to create new arrangements for three songs from the original Broadway production of Annie: "I Think I'm Gonna Like It Here", "You're Never Fully Dressed Without a Smile" and "Little Girls." Additionally, Sia and Kurstin wrote three new songs for the soundtrack, including "Opportunity", "Who Am I?" and "Moonquake Lake" featuring Beck.

== Singles ==
"You're Never Fully Dressed Without A Smile" by Sia was released as the lead single on October 22, 2014.

"Opportunity" by Sia was released as the second single. It officially impacted Hot/Modern/AC radio on January 19, 2015.

In July 2021, the song "Little Girls" by Cameron Diaz started to go viral on TikTok, appearing in many videos.

== Reception ==
Vulture's Lindsey Weber called Sia's "You're Never Fully Dressed Without a Smile" "different" and wrote, "If you push the original deep into the back of your brain, her modern-day modified version seems to work."

== Track listing ==
Standard edition
No.	Title	Artist	Length
1.	"Overture"	Cast	1:37
2.	"Maybe"	Quvenzhané Wallis, Zoe Margaret Colletti, Nicolette Pierini, Eden Duncan-Smith, and Amanda Troya	2:49
3.	"It's the Hard Knock Life"	Quvenzhané Wallis, Zoe Margaret Colletti, Nicolette Pierini, Eden Duncan-Smith, and Amanda Troya	2:10
4.	"Tomorrow"	Quvenzhané Wallis	2:33
5.	"I Think I'm Gonna Like It Here" (2014 film version)	Quvenzhané Wallis, Rose Byrne, and Stephanie Kurtzuba	3:31
6.	"You're Never Fully Dressed Without a Smile" (2014 film version)	Sia	3:10
7.	"Moonquake Lake"	Sia and Beck	2:53
8.	"Little Girls" (2014 film version)	Cameron Diaz	2:17
9.	"The City's Yours"	Jamie Foxx and Quvenzhané Wallis	3:12
10.	"Opportunity"	Quvenzhané Wallis	3:06
11.	"Easy Street" (2014 film version)	Bobby Cannavale and Cameron Diaz	2:16
12.	"Who Am I?"	Cameron Diaz, Jamie Foxx, and Quvenzhané Wallis	3:20
13.	"I Don't Need Anything But You" (2014 film version)	Jamie Foxx, Quvenzhané Wallis, and Rose Byrne	2:25
14.	"Tomorrow" (Finale)	Cast	1:31
15.	"Opportunity" (Sia version)	Sia	3:14

Deluxe edition: Target exclusive
No.	Title	Artist	Length
16.	"Something Was Missing"	Jamie Foxx	2:19
17.	"Cut to the Chase"	Greg Kurstin	2:55

== Charts ==
=== Weekly charts ===
Chart (2015)	Peak position
Australian Albums (ARIA)	52
US Billboard 200	12
US Soundtrack Albums (Billboard)	3

=== Year-end charts ===
Chart (2015)	Position
US Billboard 200	150
US Soundtrack Albums (Billboard)	10
