= Please Clap Your Hands =

EP by The Bird and the Bee
- Released: September 25, 2007
- Genre: Indie pop, electronic
- Length: 16:54
- Label: Metro Blue, Blue Note
- Producer: Greg Kurstin

The Bird and the Bee chronology
The Bird and the Bee (2006)	Please Clap Your Hands (2007)	One Too Many Hearts (2008)

Professional ratings
Review scores
Source	Rating
Allmusic	3.5/5 stars
PopMatters	7/10
Prefix	7.0/10
Robert Christgau	(choice cut)

Please Clap Your Hands is the second EP by American indie pop duo The Bird and the Bee, released on September 25, 2007 by Blue Note Records. It contains four original tracks and a cover of The Bee Gees' 1977 song "How Deep Is Your Love", which features backing vocals from Australian singer Sia.

In addition to the regular duo, the EP contains other instrumental contributions from members of their touring band, including drummer Joey Waronker, guitarist Gus Seyffert, and backing vocalists Megan Geer-Alsop, Willow Geer-Alsop, Alex Lilly, and the aforementioned Sia.

== Track listing ==
All tracks are written by Greg Kurstin and Inara George, except where noted.

No.	Title	Length
1.	"Polite Dance Song"	3:48
2.	"Man"	3:03
3.	"The Races"	3:27
4.	"So You Say"	3:12
5.	"How Deep Is Your Love" (Barry Gibb, Maurice Gibb, Robin Gibb)	3:24

Japan bonus tracks
No.	Title	Length
6.	"Again & Again"	2:45
7.	"Fucking Boyfriend"	3:14
8.	"Again & Again" (Hotel Room Bossanova Version)	2:46

== Personnel ==
Credits for Please Clap Your Hands adapted from liner notes.

The Bird and the Bee

- Greg Kurstin – engineer, mixing, producer
- Inara George – vocals

Additional personnel

- Michael Dahan – cover photography
- Megan Geer-Alsop – backing vocals (1)
- Willow Geer-Alsop – backing vocals (1)
- Gordon H. Jee – creative director
- Carla Leighton – design
- Alex Lilly – backing vocals (1)
- Gus Seyffert – guitar (1)
- Sia – backing vocals (5)
- Joey Waronker – drums (1, 2)

== See also ==
- Jeb Bush
