= Simple Song (The Shins song) =

Single by The Shins

from the album Port of Morrow
- Released: January 10, 2012
- Recorded: 2011
- Genre: Indie rock
- Length: 4:15
- Label: Aural Apothecary, Columbia
- Songwriter: James Mercer
- Producers: Greg Kurstin, James Mercer

The Shins singles chronology
"Sea Legs" (2007)	"Simple Song" (2012)	"It's Only Life" (2012)

"Simple Song" is a song by American indie rock band The Shins from their fourth studio album Port of Morrow. Written by the group's frontman James Mercer, the song was released as the first single from the album.

== Background ==
In an interview with Q, the band's frontman, James Mercer, has stated that the song was "about my wife, our relationship and this whole new life we [had] ahead of us." Additionally, Mercer stated that the song was also, in part, about the departures of drummer Jesse Sandoval and keyboardist Martin Crandall from The Shins.

Explaining the origins of the song, Mercer revealed that he wrote the song in the living room of his apartment, shortly following his marriage and in the period leading to the birth of his first daughter.

== Musicians ==
- Dave Hernandez – lead electric guitar
- Greg Kurstin – acoustic guitar, electric guitar, synthesizers, Mellotron, piano
- Ron Lewis – bass guitar
- James Mercer – vocals, electric guitar
- Janet Weiss – drums, tambourine

== Music video ==
The surrealist music video, staged as Mercer's funeral, was directed by DANIELS, a directing duo best known as the team behind the video for the song "Turn Down for What", and the films Swiss Army Man and Everything Everywhere All at Once. His backing band at the time, Richard Swift, Joe Plummer, Yuuki Matthews and Jessica Dobson, appeared in double roles as Mercer's children and as the performers of the song, although none of them were featured on the actual recording.

== Charts ==
=== Weekly charts ===
Chart (2011)	Peak position
Belgium (Ultratip Flanders)	4
Canada Alternative Rock (America's Music Charts)	11
UK Singles (Official Charts Company)	192
Japan Hot 100 Singles (Billboard)	96
Switzerland Airplay (Schweizer Hitparade)	95
US Bubbling Under Hot 100 Singles (Billboard)	6
US Alternative Songs (Billboard)	10
US Rock Songs (Billboard)	19

=== Year-end charts ===
Chart (2012)	Position
US Alternative Songs (Billboard)	38
US Hot Rock Songs (Billboard)	61

== In popular culture ==
- In 2012, the song was used in an episode of Saturday Night Live (Season 37, Episode 17)
- In 2012, The Shins performed Simple Song on Late Show with David Letterman
- In 2013, Simple Song was featured in How I Met Your Mother (Season 8, Episode 24 "Something New")
