= Again =

Again may refer to:

== Entertainment ==
- Again (video game), a 2009 adventure game for the Nintendo DS
- Again!! manga
- Again!, a 2011 children's book by Emily Gravett
- Again (film), a 2015 Japanese film

== Music ==
- Again (band), a Chinese rock band

=== Albums ===
- Again (Oliver album), 1970
- Fitzgerald and Pass... Again, 1976
- Again (Alan Stivell album), 1993
- Again (Jewelry album), 2002
- Again (Colder album), 2003
- Again (Pnau album), 2003
- Again (Retro Grave album), 2010
- Again (Ayumi Hamasaki EP), 2012
- Again (T-ara EP), 2013
- Again (Oneohtrix Point Never album), 2023
- Again (The Belair Lip Bombs album), 2025
- Again, by GreatGuys, 2021

=== Songs ===
- "Again" (1949 song), a popular song written by Lionel Newman and Dorcas Cochran and also recorded by many other singers
- "Again", by James Gang from Thirds, 1971
- "Again" (Shizuka Kudo song), 1987
- "Again" (Janet Jackson song), 1993
- "Again" (Alice in Chains song), 1995
- "Again" (Lenny Kravitz song), 2000
- "Again", by Archive from You All Look the Same to Me, 2002
- "Again", by Kutless from Kutless, 2002
- "Again", by Jennifer Lopez from This Is Me... Then, 2002
- "Again", by Earshot from Two, 2004
- "Again" (Faith Evans song), 2005
- "Again", by Yui Sakakibara, 2006
- "Again" (Yui song), 2008
- "Again" (Flyleaf song), 2009
- "Again" (Jessica Sutta song), 2013
- "Again" (Fetty Wap song), 2015
- "Again" (Noah Cyrus Song), 2017
- "Again", by Sasha Alex Sloan from Loser, 2018
- "Again" (Black Stone Cherry song), 2020
- "Again", by Third Eye Blind from Our Bande Apart, 2021

== Other uses ==
- "Again", a painting by Thomas Hart Benton (painter)
- Again River, a tributary of Harricana River in Canada
- Again (horse), a racehorse

== See also ==
- Again and Again (disambiguation)
