= You're Never Fully Dressed Without a Smile =

Song from the musical "Annie"

"You're Never Fully Dressed Without a Smile" is a song from the Broadway musical Annie, written by Charles Strouse and Martin Charnin.

== Sia cover ==
"You're Never Fully Dressed Without a Smile" (2014 film version)

Single by Sia

from the album Annie
- Released: 22 October 2014
- Studio: Echo (Los Angeles)
- Length: 3:10
- Label: Columbia; Roc Nation; Overbrook; Madison Gate; RCA
- Songwriters: Charles Strouse; Martin Charnin; Sia Furler; Greg Kurstin (new lyrics)

Sia singles chronology
"Guts Over Fear" (2014)	"You're Never Fully Dressed Without a Smile" (2014 film version) (2014)	"Elastic Heart" (2015)

Music video
- "You're Never Fully Dressed Without a Smile (2014 film version)" on YouTube

Sia covered the song for the soundtrack for the 2014 film. The single charted in Australia, Belgium, UK and in Poland where it became an airplay hit—the song peaked at number 3 on the Polish Airplay Top 20 Chart and at number 2 on the Polish TV Airplay Chart.

=== Music video ===
The video for this song was filmed in New York City, USA. It features the cast from the actual film as they spread cheer to the citizens of the city by dancing, performing random acts of kindness and holding signs with the word "smile" written on them.

=== Charts ===
Chart (2014–2015)	Peak position
Australia (ARIA)	71
Belgium (Ultratip Bubbling Under Flanders)	7
Germany (Airplay Chart)	85
Poland Airplay (ZPAV)	3
Poland (Polish Airplay New)	1
Poland (Polish TV Airplay Chart)	2
UK Singles (OCC)	125

=== Release history ===
Region	Date	Format	Label	Ref
Australia	October 22, 2014	Digital download	Columbia Pictures	
Belgium	October 22, 2014	Digital download	Roc Nation; Overbrook; Madison Gate; RCA	
Finland	October 22, 2014	Digital download	Roc Nation; Overbrook; Madison Gate; RCA	
France	October 22, 2014	Digital download	Roc Nation; Overbrook; Madison Gate; RCA	
Germany	October 22, 2014	Digital download	Roc Nation; Overbrook; Madison Gate; RCA	
Sweden	October 22, 2014	Digital download	Roc Nation; Overbrook; Madison Gate; RCA	
Switzerland	October 22, 2014	Digital download	Roc Nation; Overbrook; Madison Gate; RCA	
United Kingdom	October 22, 2014	Digital download	Roc Nation; Overbrook; Madison Gate; RCA	
United States	October 22, 2014	Digital download	Roc Nation; Overbrook; Madison Gate; RCA	
United States	November 4, 2014	Contemporary hit radio	RCA	
United Kingdom	January 4, 2015	CD single	RCA	
