= One Too Many Hearts =

EP by The Bird and the Bee
- Released: February 12, 2008
- Genre: Indie pop, electronic
- Length: 12:31
- Label: Blue Note
- Producer: Greg Kurstin

The Bird and the Bee chronology
Please Clap Your Hands (2007)	One Too Many Hearts (2008)	Ray Guns Are Not Just the Future (2008)

Professional ratings
Review scores
Source	Rating
Blogcritics	favorable
Prefix	7.5/10

One Too Many Hearts is the third EP by American indie pop duo The Bird and the Bee. It was released digitally on February 12, 2008 by Blue Note Records. Inara "Bird" George provided lead vocals for the four tracks, while Greg "Bee" Kurstin plays the guitar and also produces the EP.

== Track listing ==
All tracks are written by Greg Kurstin and Inara George, except where noted.

No.	Title	Length
1.	"Birthday"	3:29
2.	"Last Day of Our Love"	3:18
3.	"Come as You Were"	3:00
4.	"Tonight You Belong to Me" (Billy Rose, Lee David)	2:44
