= Again and Again and Again and Again =

EP by the Bird and the Bee
- Released: October 31, 2006
- Recorded: 2006
- Genre: Indie pop, electronic
- Length: 15:38
- Label: Metro Blue, Blue Note
- Producer: Greg Kurstin

The Bird and the Bee chronology
Again and Again and Again and Again (2006)	The Bird and the Bee (2007)

Singles from Again and Again and Again and Again
- 1. "Fucking Boyfriend" Released: 2006; 2. "Again & Again" Released: 2007

Professional ratings
Review scores
Source	Rating
PopMatters	6/10

Again and Again and Again and Again is the debut EP by American indie pop duo the Bird and the Bee. It was released on October 31, 2006, by Blue Note Records, three months before the duo's first full-length album, The Bird and the Bee. The EP contributed three tracks to the album. Exclusive to the EP is a remix of the duo's first single, "Fucking Boyfriend," by Canadian electronic musician Peaches.

== Track listing ==
All tracks are written by Greg Kurstin and Inara George.

No.	Title	Producer(s)	Length
1.	"Again & Again"	Kurstin	2:45
2.	"I'm a Broken Heart"	Kurstin	4:32
3.	"Fucking Boyfriend"	Kurstin	3:15
4.	"Fucking Boyfriend" (Peaches Remix)	Kurstin; Peaches	5:06

== Personnel ==
Credits for Again and Again and Again and Again adapted from EP liner notes.

The Bird and the Bee

- Greg Kurstin – engineer, instrumentation, mixing, producer
- Inara George – vocals (all tracks); fuzz bass (1)

Additional personnel

- Peaches – mixing, remix producer
- Autumn de Wilde – photography
- Josh Gold – project manager
- Gordon H. Jee – creative director
- Gavin Lurssen – mastering
- David McEowen – mastering
- David Ralicke – horn (2)
- Helen Verhoeven – cover painting
- Burton Yount – art direction, design

== In popular culture ==
The title track is sampled by Mac Miller on the song "Lucky Ass Bitch" featuring Juicy J off of his 2012 mixtape, Macadelic.
