= The Bird and the Bee (album) =

2007 studio album by the Bird and the Bee

Studio album by the Bird and the Bee
- Released: January 23, 2007
- Recorded: 2006
- Genre: Indie pop; electronic
- Length: 35:45
- Label: Metro Blue; Blue Note
- Producer: Greg Kurstin

The Bird and the Bee chronology
Again and Again and Again and Again (2006)	The Bird and the Bee (2007)	Please Clap Your Hands (2007)

Professional ratings
Aggregate scores
Source	Rating
Metacritic	74/100
Review scores
Source	Rating
AllMusic	3.5/5 stars
The A.V. Club	B
Entertainment Weekly	B+
The Guardian	3/5 stars
Los Angeles Times	3/4 stars
Now	4/5
The Observer	3/5 stars
Pitchfork	6.0/10
PopMatters	7/10
Rolling Stone	3.5/5 stars

The Bird and the Bee is the debut studio album by American indie pop duo the Bird and the Bee, released on January 23, 2007, by Blue Note Records. Containing three tracks which appeared on the band's 2006 EP Again and Again and Again and Again, the album received positive reviews from music critics. The first single, "Fucking Boyfriend", reached number one on Billboard's Hot Dance Club Play chart in December 2006.

== Track listing ==
All tracks are written by Greg Kurstin and Inara George.

No.	Title	Length
1.	"Again & Again"	2:46
2.	"Birds and the Bees"	3:51
3.	"Fucking Boyfriend"	3:15
4.	"I'm a Broken Heart"	4:31
5.	"La La La"	3:19
6.	"My Fair Lady"	3:36
7.	"I Hate Camera"	3:05
8.	"Because"	3:38
9.	"Preparedness"	3:36
10.	"Spark"	4:08

Japan bonus tracks
No.	Title	Length
11.	"Fucking Boyfriend" (Ralphi Rosario & Jody DB Radio Edit)	3:48
12.	"Fucking Boyfriend" (Peaches Remix)	5:04

== Personnel ==
Credits for The Bird and the Bee adapted from liner notes.

The Bird and the Bee

- Greg Kurstin – engineer, instrumentation, mixing, producer
- Inara George – vocals (all tracks); fuzz bass (1)

Additional personnel

- Autumn de Wilde – photography
- Josh Gold – project manager
- Gordon H. Jee – creative director
- Keith Karwelies – A&R
- Gavin Lurssen – mastering
- David Ralicke – horn (4)
- Helen Verhoeven – artwork
- Eli Wolf – A&R
- Burton Yount – package design

== Charts ==
Chart (2007)	Peak position
Japanese Albums Chart	108
US Top Heatseekers	17
US Top Independent Albums	39
