= Interpreting the Masters Volume 1: A Tribute to Daryl Hall and John Oates =

Studio album by The Bird and the Bee
- Released: March 23, 2010
- Genre: Indie pop, electronic
- Length: 30:09
- Label: Blue Note
- Producer: Greg Kurstin

The Bird and the Bee chronology
Ray Guns Are Not Just the Future (2009)	Interpreting the Masters Volume 1: A Tribute to Daryl Hall and John Oates (2010)	Recreational Love (2015)

Professional ratings
Aggregate scores
Source	Rating
Metacritic	71/100
Review scores
Source	Rating
Allmusic	4/5 stars
The A.V. Club	B+
Billboard	favorable
The Independent	3/5 stars
Los Angeles Times	3/4 stars
The New York Times	favorable
Now	2/5
Phoenix New Times	C
PopMatters	5/10
Slant Magazine	2.5/5 stars

Interpreting the Masters Volume 1: A Tribute to Daryl Hall and John Oates is the third studio album by American indie pop duo The Bird and the Bee. It was released on March 23, 2010 by Blue Note Records and is a tribute album to Hall & Oates.

The album includes eight classic Daryl Hall and John Oates covers, along with the original song "Heard It on the Radio". Shirley Manson of the alternative rock band Garbage performs backing vocals during the chorus of their cover of the 1982 Billboard Hot 100 number-one single "Maneater".

== Track listing ==
No.	Title	Writer(s)	Length
1.	"Heard It on the Radio"	Greg Kurstin, Inara George	3:03
2.	"I Can't Go for That"	Daryl Hall, John Oates, Sara Allen	3:36
3.	"Rich Girl"	Hall	2:49
4.	"Sara Smile"	Hall, Oates	3:06
5.	"Kiss on My List"	Janna Allen, Hall	4:19
6.	"Maneater"	Hall, Oates, S. Allen	3:32
7.	"She's Gone"	Hall, Oates	3:03
8.	"Private Eyes"	Hall, Warren Pash, S. Allen, J. Allen	3:03
9.	"One on One"	Hall	3:40
Total length:			30:09

Japan bonus track
No.	Title	Writer(s)	Length
10.	"4th of July"	Kurstin, George	2:45
Total length:			32:54

== Personnel ==
Credits for Interpreting the Masters Volume 1: A Tribute to Daryl Hall and John Oates adapted from liner notes.

The Bird and the Bee

- Greg Kurstin – bass, drums, engineer, keyboards, mixing, producer, programming (all tracks); guitar (6)
- Inara George – vocals

Additional personnel

- Shanieka Brooks – product manager
- Antwon Jackson – A&R administration
- Gordon H. Jee – creative director
- Carla Leighton – art direction, design
- Gavin Lurssen – mastering
- Shirley Manson – backing vocals (6)
- Cydney Puro – photography
- Watchdog Management – management
- Eli Wolf – A&R

== Charts ==
Chart (2010)	Peak position
Japanese Albums Chart	145
US Billboard 200	75
US Alternative Albums	14
US Rock Albums	20
