= Fucking Boyfriend =

Single by The Bird and the Bee

from the album Again and Again and Again and Again and The Bird and the Bee
- B-side: "La La La"
- Released: 2006
- Recorded: 2006
- Genre: Downtempo; indie pop
- Length: 3:17
- Label: Blue Note
- Songwriters: Greg Kurstin; Inara George
- Producer: Greg Kurstin

The Bird and the Bee singles chronology
"Fucking Boyfriend" (2006)	"Again & Again" (2007)

"Fucking Boyfriend" (“F**king Boyfriend” for radio and during its chart run) is the name of a song by American duo the Bird and the Bee. The single, which topped the U.S. Hot Dance Club Play chart in December 2006, is featured on the acts' 2006 EP Again and Again and Again and Again and their 2007 full-length CD The Bird and the Bee. The EP version was remixed by Canadian Electronica artist/DJ Peaches, while the CD Maxi releases were remixed by Ralphi Rosario & Jody den Broeder.

Reviewer Jon Young of Mother Jones cited "Fucking Boyfriend" as an example of how The Bird and the Bee "have something more subversive in mind, slipping corrosive thoughts inside their sugary confections". Margaret Coble of Curve called it "a snappy, bouncy dance floor ditty that takes on that angsty crush feeling all lovers' hearts can identify with."

"Fucking Boyfriend" reached number one on the Hot Dance Club Play, and marks the first time ever that a single on said chart with an explicit word in its title. Because of that word, radio stations only played the edited version of the song in their club mix shows and received limited airplay at dance radio, and during its run at Dance Club Songs, the title was censored to read “F**king Boyfriend” out of concern from its readers.

== Song in popular culture ==
- "Fucking Boyfriend" has also appeared in the 2008 film Forgetting Sarah Marshall.

== Track listings ==
"Fucking Boyfriend" – 7-inch single
No.	Title	Length
1.	"Fucking Boyfriend"	3:15
2.	"La La La"	5:04
Total length:		8:19

"Fucking Boyfriend" – Remix EP
No.	Title	Length
1.	"Fucking Boyfriend" (Album version)	3:15
2.	"Fucking Boyfriend" (Ralphi Rosario & Jody dB Vox Mix)	8:30
3.	"Fucking Boyfriend" (Peaches Remix)	5:04
4.	"Fucking Boyfriend" (Clean version)	3:15
5.	"Fucking Boyfriend" (Instrumental)	3:13
6.	"Fucking Boyfriend" (Ralphi Rosario & Jody dB Thick Dub)	9:43
Total length:		33:00

"Fucking Boyfriend" – Ralphi Rosario & Jody dB remix EP
No.	Title	Length
1.	"Fucking Boyfriend" (Ralphi Rosario & Jody dB Vox Mix)	8:30
2.	"Fucking Boyfriend" (Ralphi Rosario & Jody dB Clean Mix)	8:30
3.	"Fucking Boyfriend" (Ralphi Rosario & Jody dB Mixshow Edit)	5:31
4.	"Fucking Boyfriend" (Ralphi Rosario & Jody dB Radio Edit)	3:48
5.	"Fucking Boyfriend" (Ralphi Rosario & Jody dB Thick Dub)	9:43
6.	"Fucking Boyfriend" (Album version)	3:15
Total length:		39:17

"Fucking Boyfriend" – Ralphi Rosario & Jody dB digital remix EP
No.	Title	Length
1.	"Fucking Boyfriend" (Ralphi Rosario & Jody dB Vox Mix)	8:31
2.	"Fucking Boyfriend" (Ralphi Rosario & Jody dB Mixshow Edit)	5:32
3.	"Fucking Boyfriend"	3:15
Total length:		17:18
