= Stockings by the Fire =

Compilation album by Various artists
- Released: November 1, 2007
- Genre: Holiday
- Length: 49:58
- Label: EMI/Hear Music

Stockings by the Fire is a holiday compilation album released in November 2007 in the United States through Starbucks' record label Hear Music. In the United States, the album reached a peak position of number 34 on the Billboard 200 and number four on Billboard's Top Independent Albums chart.

== Track listing ==
1. "Baby, It's Cold Outside", performed by Ray Charles (originally by Frank Loesser, 1944)
2. "I Heard the Bells on Christmas Day", performed by Sarah McLachlan (originally by Henry Wadsworth Longfellow, 1864)
3. "I'll Be Home for Christmas (If Only in My Dreams)", performed by Frank Sinatra (originally by Walter Kent, 1943)
4. "Have Yourself a Merry Little Christmas", performed by Hem (originally by Hugh Martin and Ralph Blane, 1944)
5. "Sleigh Ride", performed by Ella Fitzgerald (originally composed by Leroy Anderson, lyrics by Mitchell Parish)
6. "What Are You Doing New Year's Eve?", performed by Rufus Wainwright (originally by Frank Loesser)
7. "River", performed by Herbie Hancock (originally by Joni Mitchell)
8. "Rudolph the Red-Nosed Reindeer", performed by Jack Johnson (originally by Johnny Marks)
9. "Carol of the Bells", performed by The Bird and the Bee (originally by Mykola Leontovych, 1916)
10. "Let It Snow", performed by A Fine Frenzy (originally by Sammy Cahn and composer Jule Styne, 1945)
11. "The Christmas Song (Merry Christmas to You)", performed by Nat King Cole (originally by Mel Tormé and Bob Wells, 1944)
12. "I've Got My Love to Keep Me Warm", performed by Dean Martin (originally by Irving Berlin, 1937)
13. "Winter Wonderland", performed by Diana Krall (originally by Felix Bernard and Richard B. Smith, 1934)
14. "Do You Hear What I Hear?", performed by Mahalia Jackson
15. "It Don't Have to Change", performed by John Legend
16. "White Christmas", performed by Aimee Mann (originally by Irving Berlin)

== Personnel ==
- Leroy Anderson – composer
- Irving Berlin – composer
- Felix Bernard – composer
- The Bird and the Bee – primary artist
- Betty Carter – primary artist
- Ray Charles – primary artist
- Nat King Cole – primary artist
- A Fine Frenzy – primary artist
- Ella Fitzgerald – primary artist
- Herbie Hancock – primary artist
- Hem – primary artist
- Mahalia Jackson – primary artist
- Jack Johnson – primary artist
- Timothy Jones – compilation producer
- Diana Krall – primary artist
- Johnny Legend – primary artist
- Mykola Dmytrovich Leontovich – composer
- Aimee Mann – primary artist
- Johnny Marks – composer
- Dean Martin – primary artist
- Robert May – composer
- Sarah McLachlan – primary artist
- Joni Mitchell – composer
- Corinne Bailey Rae – primary artist
- Frank Sinatra – primary artist
- The Stevens Family – primary artist
- Steven Stolder – liner notes
- Rufus Wainwright – primary artist
- Robert Wells – composer
- Peter J. Wilhousky – composer

Credits adapted from Allmusic.

== Charts ==
In the United States, Stockings by the Fire reached peak positions of number 34 on the Billboard 200 and number four on Billboard's Top Independent Albums chart.

=== Weekly charts ===
Chart (2007)	Peak position
US Billboard 200	34
US Top Holiday Albums (Billboard)	3
US Independent Albums (Billboard)	4

=== Year-end charts ===
Chart (2008)	Position
US Billboard 200	162
