= Recreational Love =

Studio album by The Bird and the Bee
- Released: July 10, 2015
- Genre: Indie pop; electropop
- Length: 34:54
- Label: Rostrum
- Producer: Greg Kurstin

The Bird and the Bee chronology
Interpreting the Masters Volume 1: A Tribute to Daryl Hall and John Oates (2010)	Recreational Love (2015)	Interpreting The Masters Volume 2: A Tribute to Van Halen (2019)

Professional ratings
Review scores
Source	Rating
Allmusic	4/5 stars

Recreational Love is the fourth studio album by the American indie pop duo The Bird and the Bee, released by Rostrum Records on July 10, 2015. The first single, "Will You Dance?" was released on May 5, 2015.

== Track listing ==
All tracks are written by Greg Kurstin and Inara George.

No.	Title	Length
1.	"Young and Dumb"	3:31
2.	"Recreational Love"	3:10
3.	"Will You Dance?"	3:35
4.	"Runaway"	3:56
5.	"Please Take Me Home"	3:11
6.	"Jenny"	3:08
7.	"Los Angeles"	3:29
8.	"Doctor"	3:37
9.	"We're Coming To You"	4:04
10.	"Lovey Dovey"	3:13

Japanese edition
No.	Title	Length
11.	"Undone"	3:13
12.	"Will You Dance?" (Robert DeLong Remix)	3:40
