= It's Only Life =

Single by The Shins

from the album Port of Morrow
- Released: March 16, 2012
- Recorded: 2011
- Genre: Indie pop, indie rock
- Length: 4:01
- Label: Aural Apothecary/Columbia
- Songwriter: James Mercer

The Shins singles chronology
"Simple Song" (2012)	"It's Only Life" (2012)	"No Way Down / Fall of '82" (2012)

Music video
- "It's Only Life" on YouTube

"It's Only Life" is a song performed by The Shins, issued as the second single from their album Port of Morrow. The song was written by the band's lead singer James Mercer.

== Critical reception ==
The song has received mixed to positive reviews from critics. Brendan of MusicUnderFire praised Mercer's skills in writing the song and further stated that the song "smashes [the previous single] to pieces". Matt from A Heart is a Spade considered the song a "heart-on-sleeve" track and called its accompanying video "sentimental". Conversely, Michael Roffman of Consequence of Sound gave the song a negative review, stating that the song is "the sort of sappy fluff whose plasticity poisons a genre". The reviews differed in their assessments of the song's songwriting, tone, and overall style.

== Music video ==
The official music video for the song was directed by Hiro Murai.

== Live performances ==
The band has performed the song on the Late Show with David Letterman and Saturday Night Live.
