= The Bird and the Bee =

American indie pop musical duo

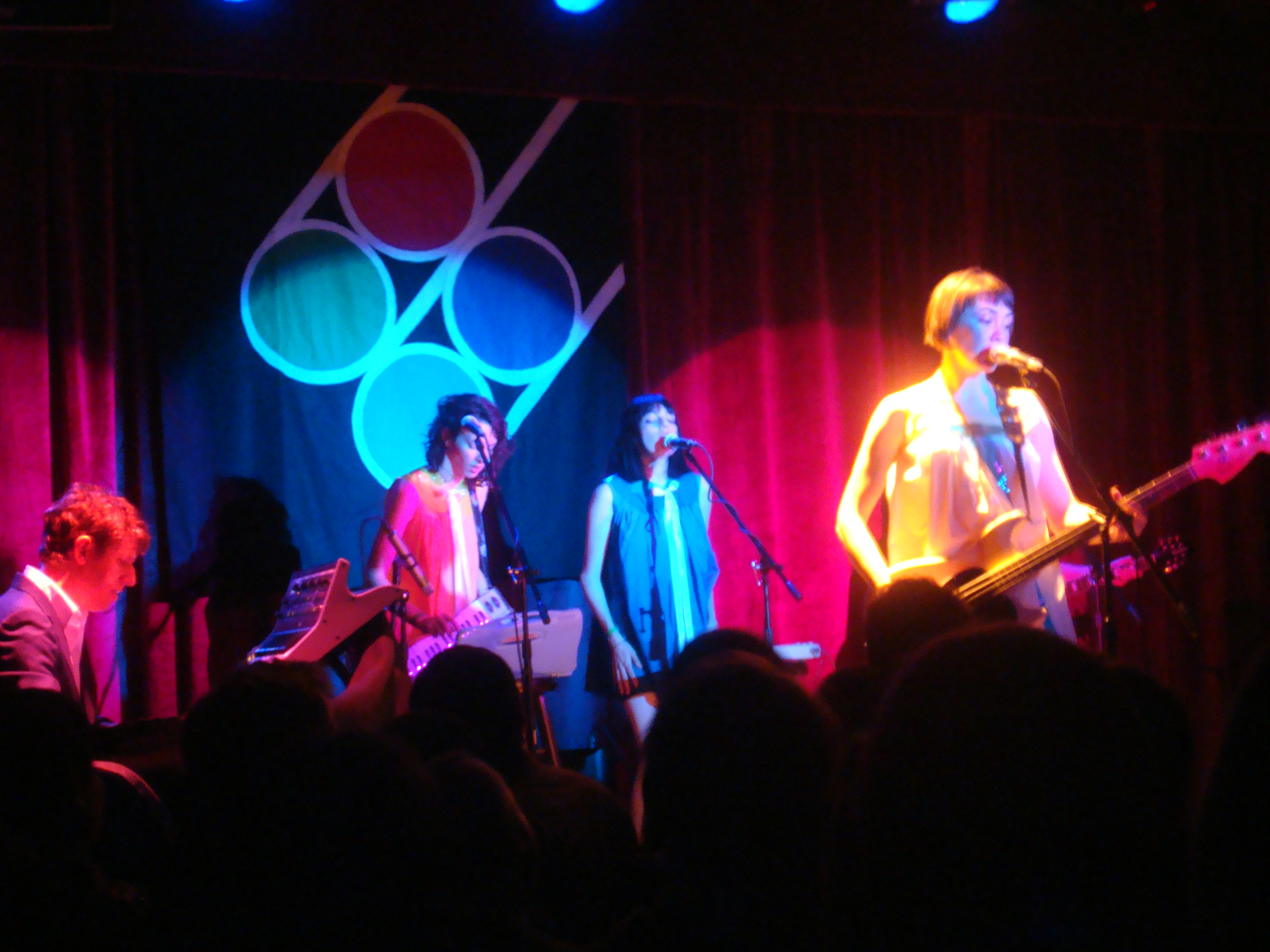
- The Bird and the Bee performing at The Bell House in Brooklyn, New York City on March 6, 2009. From left: Greg Kurstin, Alex Lilly, Juliette Commagere, Inara George

Background information
- Origin: Los Angeles, California, U.S.
- Genres: Indie pop, synthpop, dream pop
- Years active: 2006–present
- Labels: Metro Blue; Blue Note; Rostrum
- Members: Inara George (The Bird); Greg Kurstin (The Bee)
- Website: thebirdandthebee.com

the bird and the bee is an American indie pop musical duo from Los Angeles, consisting of Inara George ("the bird") and Greg Kurstin ("the bee"). Kurstin is a nine-time Grammy Award–winning producer and multi-instrumentalist who has worked with artists including Sia, Adele, Beck, Kendrick Lamar, and the Foo Fighters. George and Kurstin met while the two were working on her debut album and they decided to collaborate on a jazz-influenced electropop project. Their debut EP, Again and Again and Again and Again, was released on October 31, 2006, followed by their self-titled debut album on January 23, 2007.

== History ==
=== 2006–07: Formation and The Bird and the Bee ===
According to their Myspace page, Greg and Inara were introduced in 2004 by mutual friend Mike Andrews, whom George had enlisted to produce her solo debut, All Rise. George and Kurstin soon found themselves spending hours together in the studio, where a shared interest in jazz-based music helped lay the foundation for the Bird and the Bee. [They] began to explore new sounds and textures, eventually composing enough material for their debut EP." That EP was the four-track Again and Again and Again and Again, released on October 31, 2006, by Blue Note Records. The EP includes the single "Fucking Boyfriend", which topped the Billboard Hot Dance Club Play chart on the issue dated December 2, 2006.

The duo's self-titled debut studio album, The Bird and the Bee was released on January 23, 2007 to positive reviews; AllMusic described it as "irresistible" and "charming and delightful at every turn".

Mid-2007 saw the band touring as the opening act for English singer Lily Allen, while their music was heard twice that year in the ABC drama series Grey's Anatomy, with "Again & Again" featured in the April 26 episode titled "Desire", and "Polite Dance Song" featured in the October 25 episode "Haunt You Every Day"; the former was also included on the third volume of the show's soundtrack. With the holiday season came additional exposure for the group, when Apple Inc.'s iTunes Store chose "Carol of the Bells" to be the featured "Free Single of the Week" for the week of November 27.

=== 2008–10: Ray Guns Are Not Just the Future and Interpreting the Masters Volume 1 ===
In 2008 the duo's third EP One Too Many Hearts was released exclusively in digital format on February 12, 2008, to coincide with Valentine's Day. The four-song collection featured a rendition of the 1920s standard "Tonight You Belong to Me".

The Bird and the Bee appeared repeatedly on TV and in films during 2008, with "Fucking Boyfriend" appearing in the film Forgetting Sarah Marshall and "How Deep Is Your Love" included in the film adaptation of Sex and the City and VH1 promos for their reality show lineup. On July 8 a performance recorded at Pearl Concert Theater in Las Vegas was released as a digital EP titled Live from Las Vegas at the Palms, including live versions of "Again & Again" (Bossa Nova Version), "Fucking Boyfriend", "Autumn Leaves", "Man", and "Preparedness".

In 2009 the Bird and the Bee marked the release of their second studio album, Ray Guns Are Not Just the Future, with two national television appearances: January 26 on NBC's The Tonight Show and February 4 on ABC's Jimmy Kimmel Live!. Following its January 27 release, the album debuted atop Billboard's Top Heatseekers chart on sales of 5,000 copies. In support of the album, the duo embarked on a ten-date US tour, which kicked off at The Casbah in San Diego on February 5, 2009, and ended at Carnegie Hall in New York City on March 7. On March 14, The Bird and the Bee performed at the Tricot Showroom in Los Angeles as part of a FMLY show.

On March 23, 2010, the band released Interpreting the Masters Volume 1: A Tribute to Daryl Hall and John Oates, an album of Hall & Oates cover songs.

"What's in the Middle" was featured in the thirteenth episode of the fifth season of Bones. "4th of July" was featured in the Tim and Eric Awesome Show, Great Job! episode titled "Larry". Their song "Diamond Dave" appeared in Judd Apatow's 2009 film Funny People.

=== 2011–present: Recreational Love and subsequent works ===
The Bird and the Bee announced on their official Facebook page on September 26, 2011, that they were no longer signed to Blue Note Records. They also stated, "We don't have an exact release date for the album yet, but it'll most likely be early 2012." On November 18, 2011, the duo released a digital-only Christmas single titled "Wishes" through their website.

The Bird and the Bee contributed "All Our Endless Love" to the soundtrack for the 2014 film Endless Love. This was a collaboration with Matt Berninger, and was released on the soundtrack album on 11 February 2014. They produced a new track named "Undone" for the soundtrack of Sex Tape in July of the same year.

In April 2015, George announced that a new album would be released in July of that same year. The album, released on 17 July, was titled Recreational Love. The album's debut single, "Will You Dance?" was released on 5 May 2015.

In September 2017, both George and Kurstin were featured on the Foo Fighters song "Dirty Water", from the Kurstin-produced album Concrete and Gold. George contributed the background vocals to the track, while Kurstin played the synth.

In August 2019, "Interpreting The Masters Volume 2: A Tribute to Van Halen" was released.

On October 23, 2020, they released a Christmas album Put Up The Lights through No Expectations/Release Me Records. It features Dave Grohl on drums on the track "Little Drummer Boy". The duo have continued to release holiday music on occasion, including "Christmas Without the Queen" in 2022 and songs contributed to the 2025 film Oh What Fun, which The Bird and the Bee appeared in as a musical performance cameo.

In 2022, the band released a single called "Lifetimes," a 15-year anniversary tribute to their debut album that also pays homage to their single "Again & Again."

== Touring Members ==
George and Kurstin have been backed by several musicians during their performances, including Alex Lilly, Wendy Wang, Juliette Commagere, Willow Geer, Samantha Sidley, B. Gruska, Gus Seyffert, Justin Meldal-Johnson, Joe Kennedy, and several others.

In 2010, the band was joined by John Oates at their El Rey Theatre show in Los Angeles to support their Hall & Oates tribute album.

Since 2016, the band has occasionally toured without Greg Kurstin as an all-female musical act. However, Kurstin typically appears during show encores via a pre-recorded message played on an iPad. Kurstin plays the piano accompaniment of "I'm a Broken Heart" and "How Deep Is Your Love" while George holds the iPad up to the audience and sings along.

In 2019, Dave Grohl played drums for the band during their performance at the John Anson Ford Amphitheatre.

== Discography ==
=== Studio albums ===
Title	Album details	Peak chart positions					
Title	Album details	US	US Indie	US Heat	US Digital	GRE	JPN
The Bird and the Bee	Released January 23, 2007; Label: Metro Blue, Blue Note; Formats: CD, LP, digital download	—	39	17	—	—	108
Ray Guns Are Not Just the Future	Released: January 27, 2009; Label: Blue Note; Formats: CD, LP, digital download	78	—	—	10	—	236
Interpreting the Masters Volume 1: A Tribute to Daryl Hall and John Oates	Released: March 23, 2010; Label: Blue Note; Formats: CD, LP, digital download	75	—	—	—	25	145
Recreational Love	Released: July 17, 2015; Label: Rostrum, Polydor; Formats: CD, LP, digital download	—	38	—	—	—	—
Interpreting the Masters Volume 2: A Tribute to Van Halen	Released: August 2, 2019; Label: No Expectations / Release Me Records; Formats: CD, LP, digital download	—	—	—	—	—	—
Put Up the Lights	Released: October 23, 2020; Label: No Expectations / Release Me Records; Formats: digital download	—	—	—	—	—	—
"—" denotes a recording that did not chart or was not released in that territory.

=== Extended plays ===
Title	Album details
Again and Again and Again and Again	Released: October 31, 2006; Label: Metro Blue, Blue Note; Formats: CD, digital download
I Hate Camera	Released: July 10, 2007; Label: Blue Note; Formats: digital download
Please Clap Your Hands	Released: September 25, 2007; Label: Metro Blue, Blue Note; Formats: CD, digital download
One Too Many Hearts	Release: February 12, 2008; Label: Blue Note; Format: Digital download
Live from Las Vegas at the Palms	Release: July 8, 2008; Label: Blue Note; Format: Digital download
Spotify Sessions (Live from Spotify NYC)	Release: January 15, 2016; Label: Polydor; Format: Streaming
Recreational Remixes	Release: May 6, 2016; Label: Polydor; Format: Streaming

=== Singles ===
Title	Year	Peak chart positions			Album
Title	Year	US Dance	CAN	JPN	Album
"Fucking Boyfriend"	2006	1	—	—	Again and Again and Again and Again
"Again & Again"	2007	—	—	—	The Bird and the Bee
"La La La"	2007	—	—	—	The Bird and the Bee
"Carol of the Bells"	2007	—	67	—	Stockings by the Fire
"Love Letter to Japan"	2009	—	—	82	Ray Guns Are Not Just the Future
"Diamond Dave"	2009	—	—	—	Ray Guns Are Not Just the Future
"I'm into Something Good"	2010	—	—	—	Valentine's Day
"Wishes"	2011	—	—	—	—N/a
"Undone"	2014	—	—	—	—N/a
"Will You Dance?"	2015	—	—	—	Recreational Love
"Recreational Love"	2015	—	—	—	Recreational Love
"Los Angeles"	2015	—	—	—	Recreational Love
"Panama"	2019	—	—	—	Interpreting the Masters Volume 2: A Tribute to Van Halen
"Ain't Talking 'Bout Love"	2019	—	—	—	Interpreting the Masters Volume 2: A Tribute to Van Halen
"Witch (Mija Remix)"	2021	—	—	—	—N/a
"Lifetimes"	2022	—	—	—	—N/a
"—" denotes a recording that did not chart or was not released in that territory.

=== Other charted songs ===
Title	Year	Peak chart positions	Album
Title	Year	JPN	Album
"Private Eyes"	2010	18	Interpreting the Masters Volume 1: A Tribute to Daryl Hall and John Oates

=== Other appearances ===
Title	Year	Album
"Again & Again"	2007	Grey's Anatomy: Original Soundtrack 3
"Fucking Boyfriend"	2008	Forgetting Sarah Marshall
"How Deep Is Your Love"	2008	Sex and the City: Original Motion Picture Soundtrack
"The Races"	2008	The Women
"What Happened to It"	2009	Post Grad
"A Christmas Compromise"	2009	Safety Harbor Kids Holiday Collection
"Cover Your Mouth"	2009	Yo Gabba Gabba: Fantastic Voyages
"All Our Endless Love"	2014	Endless Love (2014 American film) Soundtrack
"Runaway"	2015	Trainwreck Soundtrack
"My Love"	2017	The Big Sick: Original Motion Picture Soundtrack Imposters: Season 1, Episode 6
"Again & Again"	2018	Love Season 2, Episode 11, at end
