= Helen Verhoeven =

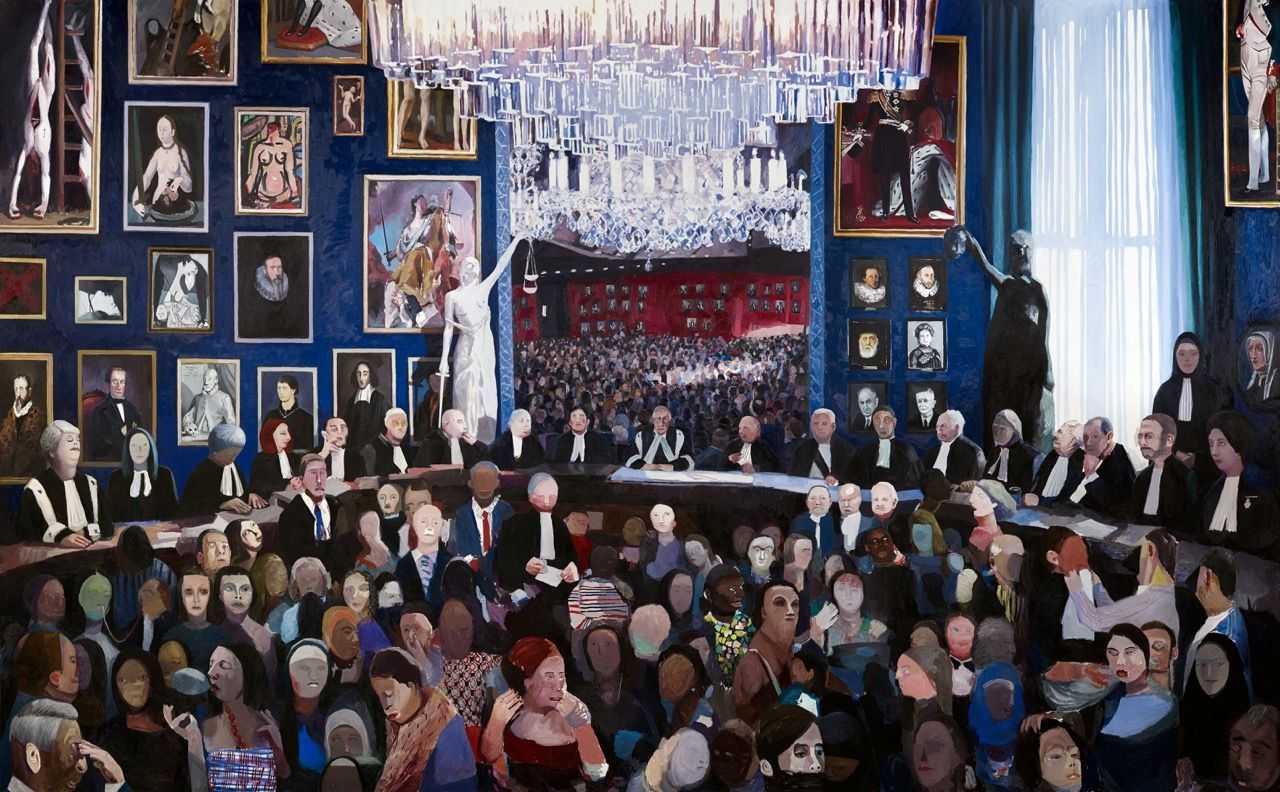
Hoge Raad (Supreme Court of the Netherlands) by Helen Verhoeven

Helen Verhoeven (born 1974 in Leiden) is a painter and sculptor based in Berlin. Verhoeven was born in the Netherlands and moved to the U.S. in 1986. She attended the San Francisco Art Institute, New York Academy of Art, and the Rijksakademie van Beeldende Kunsten in Amsterdam. In 2008 she won the Dutch Royal Award for Modern Painting, in 2010 the Wolvecamp Painting Award, and in 2019 she was the recipient of the ABN-AMRO Art Prize. She was commissioned to make a painting for the new courthouse of Dutch Supreme Court in The Hague that opened in 2015. Since 2023 she works as professor in painting for Dresden Academy of Fine Arts. Verhoeven's works seem to explore the theme of ceremonial gatherings. She makes monumental-sized paintings that are populated with contorted figures in various states of rapture, despair, lust and estrangement. She is the daughter film director Paul Verhoeven.

== External sources ==
Media related to Helen Verhoeven at Wikimedia Commons

- Rosenberg, Karen. (October 31, 2008). Art in Review. New York Times
- Hamilton, Adrian. (November 25, 2013). A Mixed Body of Work. The Independent (London)
