= Inara George =

American singer-songwriter

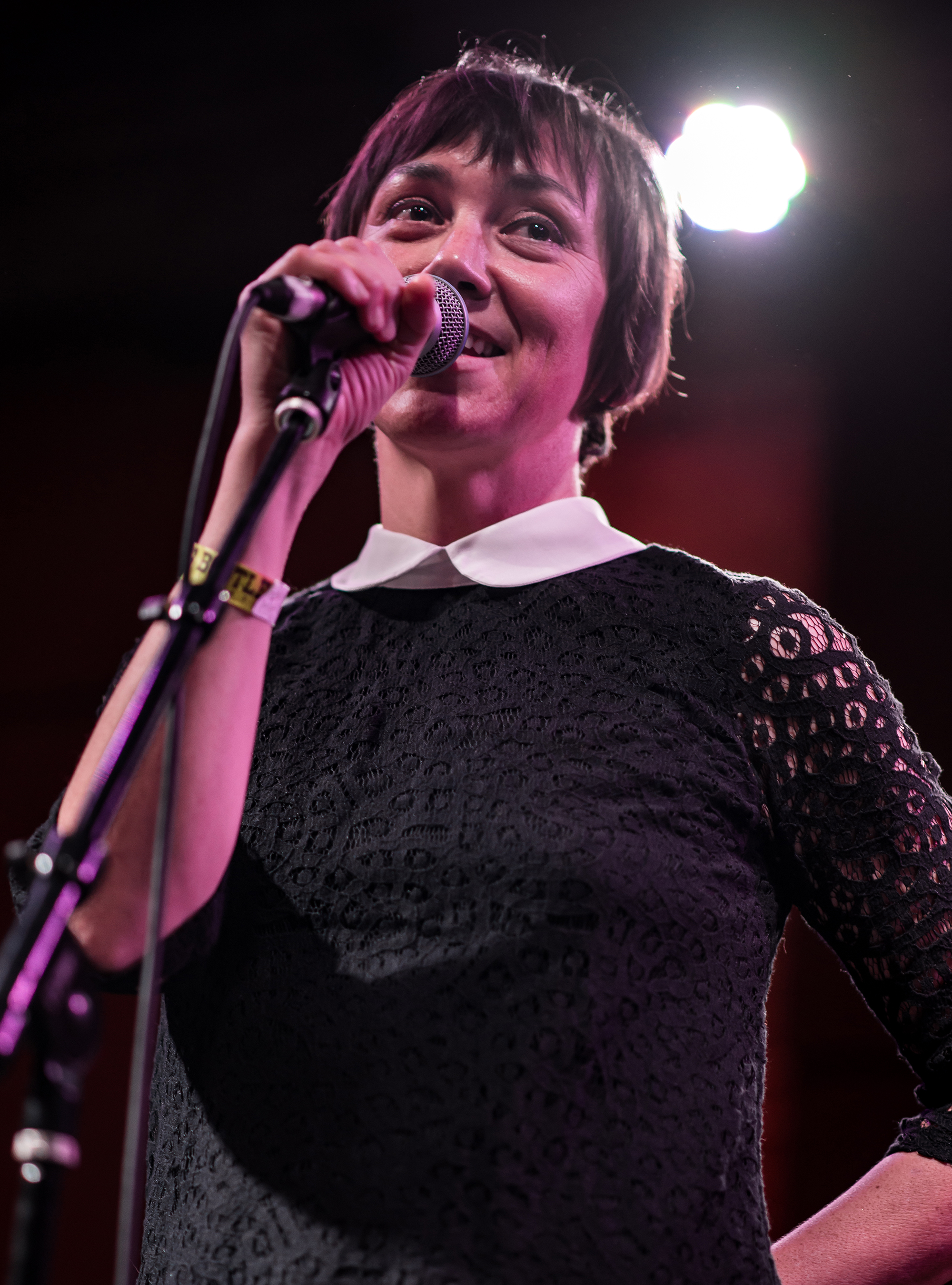
- George performing in March 2007

Background information
- Born: Inara Maryland George; July 4, 1974 (age 52); Towson, Maryland, U.S.
- Origin: Los Angeles, California
- Genres: Indie; synthpop; shoegaze; folk; country; pop
- Occupations: Musician; singer
- Instruments: Vocals; bass; guitar
- Years active: 1990s–present
- Label: Bluenote

Inara Maryland George (born July 4, 1974) is an American singer-songwriter and musician, one half of The Bird and the Bee, a member of the band Merrick, with Bryony Atkinson, and a member of the trio The Living Sisters, with Eleni Mandell and Becky Stark.

== Early life ==
George was born in Towson, Maryland. She is the daughter of Lowell George, the founder of the rock and roll group Little Feat, and Elizabeth George. Jackson Browne wrote the song "Of Missing Persons" for Inara George after the death of her father, who died just before her fifth birthday. She has three half brothers named Luke, Forrest and Jed.

George was involved with theatre at a young age, especially Theatricum Botanicum a Shakespeare company, in Topanga Canyon, a community in the Santa Monica mountains. She later relocated to Boston, Massachusetts to study acting in the classical theater tradition.

== Career ==
While visiting home one summer, George and several high-school friends launched a band named Lode. To their surprise, the bandmates landed a deal with Geffen Records and released the 1996 album Legs & Arms. Later, George joined Bryony Atkinson to form Merrick, an indie rock duo that released two albums before disbanding in 2002.

Three years later, George struck out on her own by issuing her solo debut All Rise on Everloving Records. All Rise was produced by Michael Andrews (Donnie Darko, Freaks and Geeks) and featured musical contributions from Greg Kurstin. The two formed the Bird and the Bee and released a self-titled album in 2006, followed by several EPs. While preparing for the duo's second full-length release, George also found time to return to her own project, teaming up with veteran producer and family friend Van Dyke Parks for 2008's An Invitation.

== Personal life ==
George is married to filmmaker Jake Kasdan, with whom she has three children, including twins Beau and Lorelei Kasdan and older son Otis Kasdan.

== Discography ==
=== Solo ===
- 2005: All Rise (Everloving)
- 2008: An Invitation (with Van Dyke Parks) (Everloving)
- 2009: Accidental Experimental (Everloving)
- 2018: Dearest Everybody
- 2023: What Keeps You Up at Night
- 2026: Songs Of Douglass & Littell

=== with The Bird and the Bee ===
- 2006: Again and Again and Again and Again
- 2007: The Bird and the Bee
- 2007: Please Clap Your Hands
- 2008: One Too Many Hearts
- 2009: Ray Guns Are Not Just the Future
- 2010: Interpreting the Masters Volume 1: A Tribute to Daryl Hall and John Oates
- 2015: Recreational Love
- 2019: Interpreting the Masters, Volume 2: A Tribute to Van Halen
- 2020: Put Up the Lights

=== with The Living Sisters ===
- 2010: Love To Live
- 2013: Run for Cover
- 2014: Harmony is Real: Songs for a Happy Holiday

=== with Lode ===
- 1996: Legs & Arms

=== with Merrick ===
- 2001: Merrick
- 2001: Drive Around a Lot Hard and Fast Driving Club

=== Soundtracks ===
- 1999: The Minus Man (Music from the Shooting Gallery Motion Picture)
- 2001: Heartbreakers (Original Motion Picture Soundtrack)
- 2012: Harem (Songs from the Movie That's What She Said)

=== Other appearances ===
- 1997: Trouble from the 'Rock and Roll Doctor' tribute to Lowell George
- 2002: I'll Watch Your Life to See – Wendel
- 2005: Warnings/Promises – Idlewild
- 2005: Just Before Dark – Mike Viola
- 2006: Immune to Gravity – MOTH
- 2007: Make Another World – Idlewild
- 2008: Join the Band – Little Feat
- 2009: Dark Touches – Har Mar Superstar
- 2009: I Told You I Was Freaky – Flight of the Conchords
- 2009: "He Needs Me" – Documentary "All You Need Is Klaus", Voormann & Friends – A Sideman's Journey
- 2010: "Spin The Wheel" – Super Monkey Ball: Step & Roll
- 2011: Penny Loafers from Daedelus album Bespoke
- 2012: Love is a Four Letter Word – Jason Mraz
- 2017: Concrete and Gold – Foo Fighters
- 2017: Future Friends – Superfruit
- 2018: How High (single) – Kneebody
- 2018: "People Want Peace" - Paul McCartney
- 2020: I’ll Be Your Sunny Day on The Tango Bar – Greg Copeland
- 2024: Spanish Moon on Long Distance Love - A Sweet Relief Tribute To Lowell George
