= Greg Kurstin =

American record producer and songwriter (born 1969)

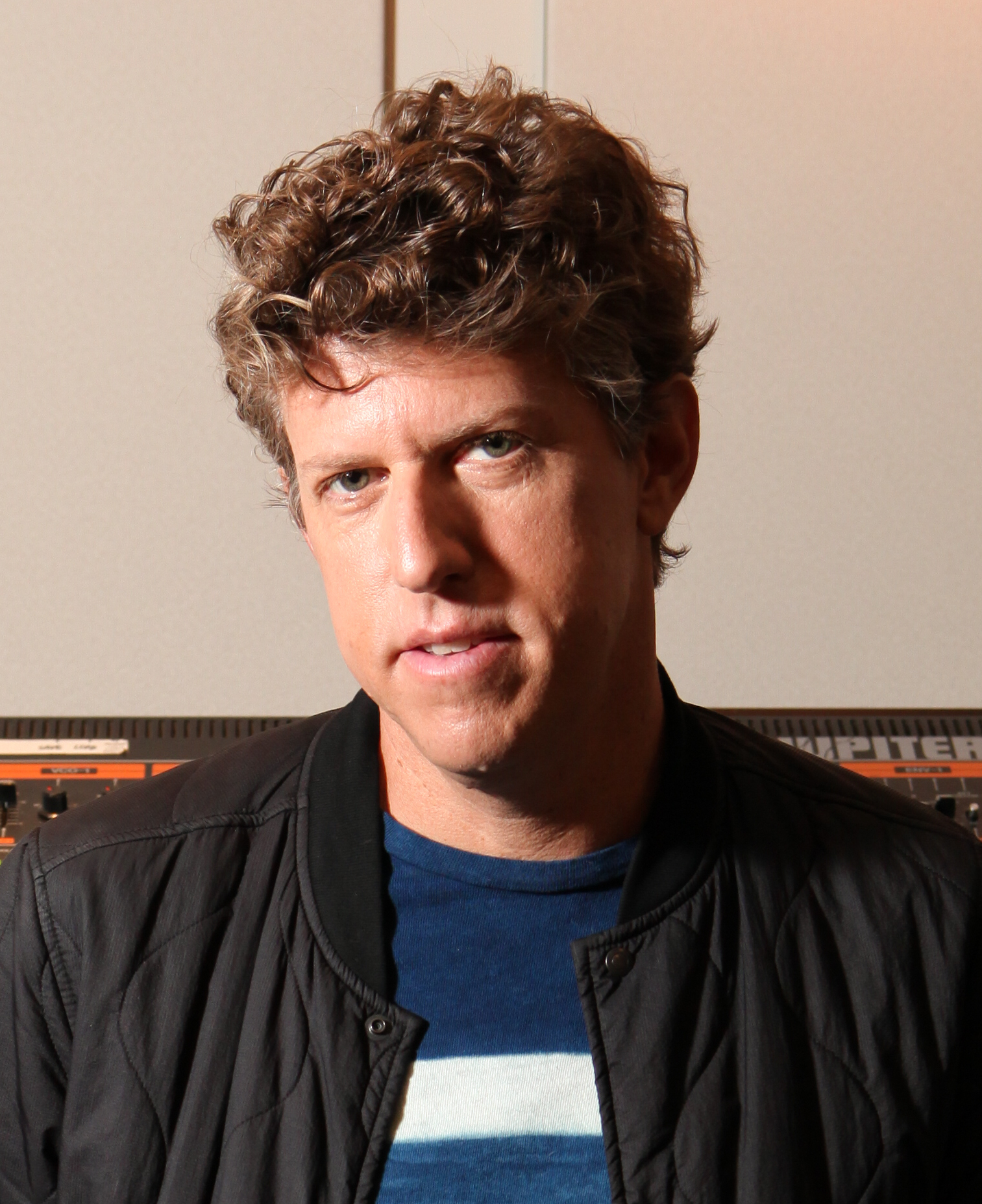
- Kurstin in 2017

Background information
- Born: Gregory Allen Kurstin; May 14, 1969 (age 57); Los Angeles, California, U.S.
- Occupations: Record producer; multi-instrumentalist; songwriter
- Instruments: Keyboards; guitar; bass; drums; vocals
- Works: Production discography
- Member of: The Bird and the Bee
- Formerly of: Geggy Tah
- Website: gregkurstin.com

Gregory Allen Kurstin (born May 14, 1969) is an American record producer, multi-instrumentalist, and songwriter. He has won nine Grammy Awards, including Producer of the Year, Non-Classical in 2017 and 2018, and contributed to five songs that peaked atop the Billboard Hot 100.

Kurstin worked closely with English singer Adele on her albums 25 (2015) and 30 (2021). He co-wrote and produced the former album's record-breaking lead single "Hello", as well as latter's lead single "Easy on Me," which entered the US Hot 100 five hours after its release, and broke all-time records on Spotify with 24 million plays within 24. Among others, he has worked with Kylie Minogue, Sia, Kelly Clarkson, Halsey, Kendrick Lamar, Maren Morris, Gorillaz, the Shins, Beck, Paul McCartney, Pink, Lily Allen, Miley Cyrus, Liam Gallagher and Foo Fighters. He often plays guitar, bass, keyboards and drums, as well as engineers and programs his musical productions.

Kurstin began his career as a jazz pianist and later co-founded Geggy Tah. He worked with singer Inara George to form the indie pop duo the Bird and the Bee in 2004.

== Early life and education ==
Kurstin was born in Los Angeles, California. He is Jewish. He started playing piano at age five. Soon after, he picked up guitar and bass. Kurstin joined his first band at the age of 11, and at 12 co-wrote "Crunchy Water", the B-side to classmate Dweezil Zappa's "My Mother Is a Space Cadet".

In high school, Kurstin focused on jazz piano. After graduation, he moved to New York to study with Charles Mingus' pianist Jaki Byard at The New School for Jazz and Contemporary Music. In addition to coursework, as a student Kurstin played with prominent jazz artists including Bobby Hutcherson, George Coleman, and Charles McPherson. He returned to Los Angeles to finish his degree, and graduated from the California Institute of the Arts with a BFA in 1992.

In a 2013 interview, Kurstin said that his education in jazz had played a vital role in his pop success. "It's still something I carry over into my pop music work. It's really important to me that the notes I'm choosing strike the right emotional chord."

== Career ==
=== 1994–2004: Geggy Tah, studio and session work ===
Kurstin continued to perform with Hutcherson, Coleman, McPherson and others following his graduation. In 1994, he formed Geggy Tah with Tommy Jordan, whom he had met at an LA jam. A friend passed a demo they recorded on to David Byrne, who signed them to his label, Luaka Bop. "They incorporate so many disparate elements into their sound that one senses a new sensibility afoot", Byrne said in 1997.

Geggy Tah released their debut album Grand Opening in 1994, which was co-produced by Susan Rogers; Kurstin played bass, clavinet, guitar, organ, piano, synthesizers and drums, and was credited as a songwriter, producer, programmer, and backup vocalist. In 1996 the band released Sacred Cow, also co-produced by Rogers. It included the song "Whoever You Are", which became a hit in 2001, after it was used in a television spot for Mercedes-Benz. As the song ascended the charts, Geggy Tah released their final album, Into the Oh.

In addition to playing with Geggy Tah, Kurstin did session work, one-offs and tours with artists including Beck, Ben Harper, Jon Hassell and the Red Hot Chili Peppers. In 2001, he released an album under the name Action Figure Party on the Verve-affiliated label Blue Thumb Records. Mostly instrumental and in a jazz-funk vein, the album featured guests Flea, Sean Lennon, Soul Coughing's Yuval Gabay as well as musicians who performed with Beck, Air, Gil-Scott Heron and Garbage.

Kurstin signed a worldwide publishing deal with EMI (now Sony/ATV) in 2002. While he had consistently written songs since the age of 12, he intensified his efforts, working "day and night, pumping out songs". In addition to writing on his own, he collaborated with songwriters and artists including Sia, whom he met through Beck in 2003.

=== 2004–2010: The Bird and the Bee, Lily Allen, Sia ===
In 2004, Kurstin was introduced to singer Inara George by a mutual friend, Mike Andrews. Then producing George's solo debut, Andrews hired Kurstin as a pianist for the album. Kurstin and George clicked musically in the studio and together they formed the bird and the bee. Shortly thereafter, they were signed by Blue Note Records chairman Bruce Lundvall. Described by Entertainment Weekly as "space-age pop that cunningly combines bossa nova languidity with Beach Boys-style lushness", they have since released four albums and an EP. Kurstin was nominated for a Grammy Award for Best Engineered Album for the Bird and the Bee's 2015 release, Recreational Love.

After working on tracks with artists including Peaches, All Saints, Pink, the Flaming Lips, and Kylie Minogue, Kurstin was introduced to Lily Allen. Along with other musicians, co-writers, producers and engineers, he worked on her 2006 debut, Alright, Still, which went on to achieve platinum status. For her second album It's Not Me, It's You, Allen worked exclusively with Kurstin; he co-wrote every song and played all of the instruments on the record, which he also engineered and produced. The album's first single, "The Fear", spent four weeks at number 1 in the UK, and the album hit number 5 in the US and charted in the top 10 in eight other countries. With Allen, Kurstin won three Ivor Novello Awards for his work on the double-platinum It's Not Me, It's You. Based in part on the album's success, as well as his work on a bird and the bee record, Kurstin was nominated for his first Producer of the Year Grammy in 2010.

Kurstin's first commercially available collaboration with Sia was "Death by Chocolate", released on her 2008 album Some People Have Real Problems. In 2010, he produced Sia's fifth album, We Are Born. It reached number 2 in Australia and number 37 in the US. It won ARIA Music Awards for Best Pop Album and Best Independent Release.

=== 2011–2016: Kelly Clarkson, the Shins, Pink, Adele ===
In 2012, Kurstin earned his first number 1 song in the United States and two Grammy Award nominations for Kelly Clarkson's "Stronger (What Doesn't Kill You)", which he co-wrote and produced. He reunited with Clarkson in 2013 (on Wrapped in Red) and in 2015 (on Piece by Piece). "I think what makes him stand out as a producer is his skill as a musician", Clarkson said. "He can play anything phenomenally. His abilities as a musician give him an advantage, because he doesn't have to rely on anyone else to interpret his vision." Critics have dubbed "Underneath the Tree," written by Kurstin and Clarkson, from Wrapped in Red a modern Christmas classic.

In 2012 Kurstin produced and wrote or co-wrote five songs for the Grammy-nominated Pink album The Truth About Love, including its first single, "Blow Me (One Last Kiss)". The album was Pink's first number 1 in the United States; it charted in the Top 10 in 31 countries, and as of 2016 had been certified seven-times platinum. Later in 2012, he began production on Tegan & Sara's Heartthrob and worked closely with the Shins' James Mercer on Port of Morrow, which debuted at number 3 on the Billboard 200.

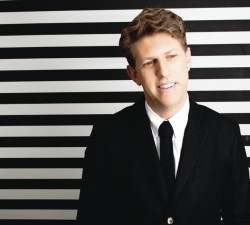
Kurstin in 2013

In addition to Clarkson, in 2013 and 2014 Kurstin wrote and produced songs which appeared on albums by Lana Del Rey, Foster the People, Ellie Goulding, Lykke Li, Katy Perry, and Charli XCX. He co-wrote and produced Ellie Goulding's "Burn", which was the number 1 single in the UK for three consecutive weeks, teamed again with Allen, and collaborated with Sia on 1000 Forms of Fear. Her most successful album to date, 1000 Forms of Fear debuted at number one on the US Billboard 200 and charted at number 1 in Australia and Canada and reached the top five charts in Denmark, New Zealand, Norway, Sweden, Switzerland, and the United Kingdom. 1000 Forms of Fear earned three ARIA Music Awards. Kurstin was nominated for a Record of the Year Grammy for the album's lead single, "Chandelier", and once again nominated as Producer of the Year.

Kurstin scored the 2014 adaptation of the film Annie and served as the soundtrack's executive producer. With Sia, he created new arrangements for the Broadway musical's original tracks and co-wrote several new songs for the film, including "Opportunity", for which he received a Golden Globe nomination.

Kurstin began working with Beck on his follow up to the Grammy-winning Morning Phase in 2015. He co-wrote and produced "Dreams", the first single from the album Colors.

Kurstin co-wrote and produced three songs on Adele's 2015 album, 25, including its first single, "Hello". In an interview with Rolling Stone, Adele said: "This song was a massive breakthrough for me with my writing because it'd been pretty slow up to this point, and I felt after I worked with Greg [Kurstin] on this, it all poured right out of me." Kurstin also played bass, guitar, drums, piano and keyboards on "Hello", which reached number one in 28 countries. It was the first record to exceed 1 million in digital sales over a 7-day period. As of February 2016, the album has sold more than 20 million copies worldwide.

=== 2016–present: Producer of the Year and continued work ===
Kurstin's fourth album with Sia, This Is Acting, was released in January 2016.

In February 2017, he won four Grammy Awards. He won Record of the Year, Album of the Year, and Song of the Year for his work on Adele's 25. He won Producer of the Year (Non-Classical) in recognition of his work with Adele, Tegan and Sara, Sia and Ellie Goulding.

In March 2017, the BBC reported that Kurstin was working with Paul McCartney on a new studio album. Kurstin co-produced the song "Love" on Kendrick Lamar's album Damn, released in March 2017. On June 1, 2017, a single by Liam Gallagher entitled "Wall of Glass" was released, which was certified platinum in the UK. It was one of four Kurstin-produced tracks included on Gallagher's debut album As You Were, three of which were co-written with Gallagher.

Kurstin produced the Foo Fighters album Concrete and Gold, which released on September 15, 2017. In an interview with Music Week, Dave Grohl said: "If you want to survive you have to kind of push a little bit. I just imagined the sound moving outwards. Not necessarily alternative instrumentation and shit like that, just sonically to push it out. Greg is a fucking genius. He's a brilliant producer and he has this sonic intuition that I have never seen in anybody else." During Hanukkah of 2020, Kurstin and Grohl released previously-recorded covers of songs by Jewish artists, one per night. This continued in 2021 and 2022.

In 2017, Kurstin launched No Expectations, a publishing joint venture with Sony/ATV. The first songwriters signed to No Expectations were Jesse Shatkin and Wendy Wang.

In 2017, Kurstin produced tracks on CHVRCHES third album, Love Is Dead. The album was released on May 28, 2018, on Virgin EMI Records and Goodbye Records.

Kurstin produced the Paul McCartney album Egypt Station, recorded over a two-year period at studios in Los Angeles and Sussex, England, and mixed at Abbey Road Studios. The album was released in September 2018.

In 2018 and 2019, Kurstin reunited with Liam Gallagher to co-write and produce four tracks for his second solo album Why Me? Why Not., including its lead single "Shockwave". The album was released in September 2019.

Kurstin also co-produced Maren Morris' second album Girl, which won the CMA Album of the Year award in 2019.

He wrote and produced three songs on Halsey's album, Manic, released in January 2020.

On April 16, 2021, the second album The Battle at Gardens Gate by Greta Van Fleet was released with Kurstin producing.

In May 2021, Kurstin won the ASCAP Golden Note Award, given to songwriters, composers and artists who have achieved extraordinary career milestones. Beck presented him with the award.

Kurstin also co-produced the Twenty One Pilots song "Saturday" off their album Scaled and Icy.

Kurstin and Adele reunited to co-write "Easy on Me," the first single from Adele's 2021 album, 30. Kurstin also produced the track, which hit #1 on the Billboard Hot 100 on October 27, 2021. "Easy on Me" was Kurstin's fourth #1 hit on the Hot 100.

In September 2022, Kurstin performed at the tribute concerts for Taylor Hawkins at Wembley Stadium in London and at the Kia Forum in Los Angeles. In Los Angeles, he played with Them Crooked Vultures and, with Rufus Taylor and Justin Hawkins, members of Coattail Riders. He played with Dave Grohl and Rush's Geddy Lee and Alex Lifeson in London.

In 2023, Kurstin co-produced the Gorillaz album Cracker Island. He also produced and wrote Jaded, which appeared on the Miley Cyrus album Endless Summer Vacation.

Kurstin produced Chaka Khan's 2026 studio album Chakzilla.

== Awards and nominations ==
=== Grammy Awards ===
Year	Nominee / work	Award	Result	Reference
2010	Himself, for body of work during eligible period	Producer of the Year, Non-Classical	Nominated	
2013	"Stronger (What Doesn't Kill You)"	Record of the Year	Nominated	
2013	"Stronger (What Doesn't Kill You)"	Song of the Year	Nominated	
2015	"Chandelier"	Record of the Year	Nominated	
2015	Himself, for body of work during eligible period	Producer of the Year, Non-Classical	Nominated	
2016	Recreational Love (The Bird and the Bee)	Best Engineered Album, Non-Classical	Nominated	
2017	25	Album of the Year	Won	
2017	"Hello"	Record of the Year	Won	
2017	"Hello"	Song of the Year	Won	
2017	Himself, for body of work during eligibility period	Producer of the Year, Non-Classical	Won	
2018	"Never Give Up"	Best Song Written for Visual Media	Nominated	
2018	Himself, for body of work during eligibility period	Producer of the Year, Non-Classical	Won	
2019	Colors	Best Alternative Music Album	Won	
2019	Colors	Best Engineered Album, Non-Classical	Won	
2021	Hyperspace	Best Engineered Album, Non-Classical	Won	
2022	Medicine at Midnight	Best Rock Album	Won	
2023	30	Album of the Year	Nominated	
2023	30	Best Pop Vocal Album	Nominated	
2023	"Easy on Me"	Record of the Year	Nominated	
2023	"Easy on Me"	Song of the Year	Nominated	
2023	Humble Quest	Best Country Album	Nominated	

=== CMA Awards ===
Year	Nominee / work	Award	Result
2019	Girl	Album of the Year	Won
2019	"Girl"	Song of the Year	Nominated
2019	"Girl"	Single of the Year	Nominated
2020	"The Bones"	Single of the Year	Won
2020	"The Bones"	Musical Event of the Year	Nominated
2022	Humble Quest	Album of the Year	Nominated

=== Ivor Novello Awards ===
Year	Nominee / work	Award	Result
2010	Himself	Songwriter of the Year	Won
2010	"The Fear"	Best Song Musically & Lyrically	Won
2010	"The Fear"	Most Performed Work	Won

=== ASCAP Awards ===
Year	Nominee / work	Award	Result
2021	Body of work	Golden Note Award	Won
