= Fender Jazzmaster =

Electric guitar

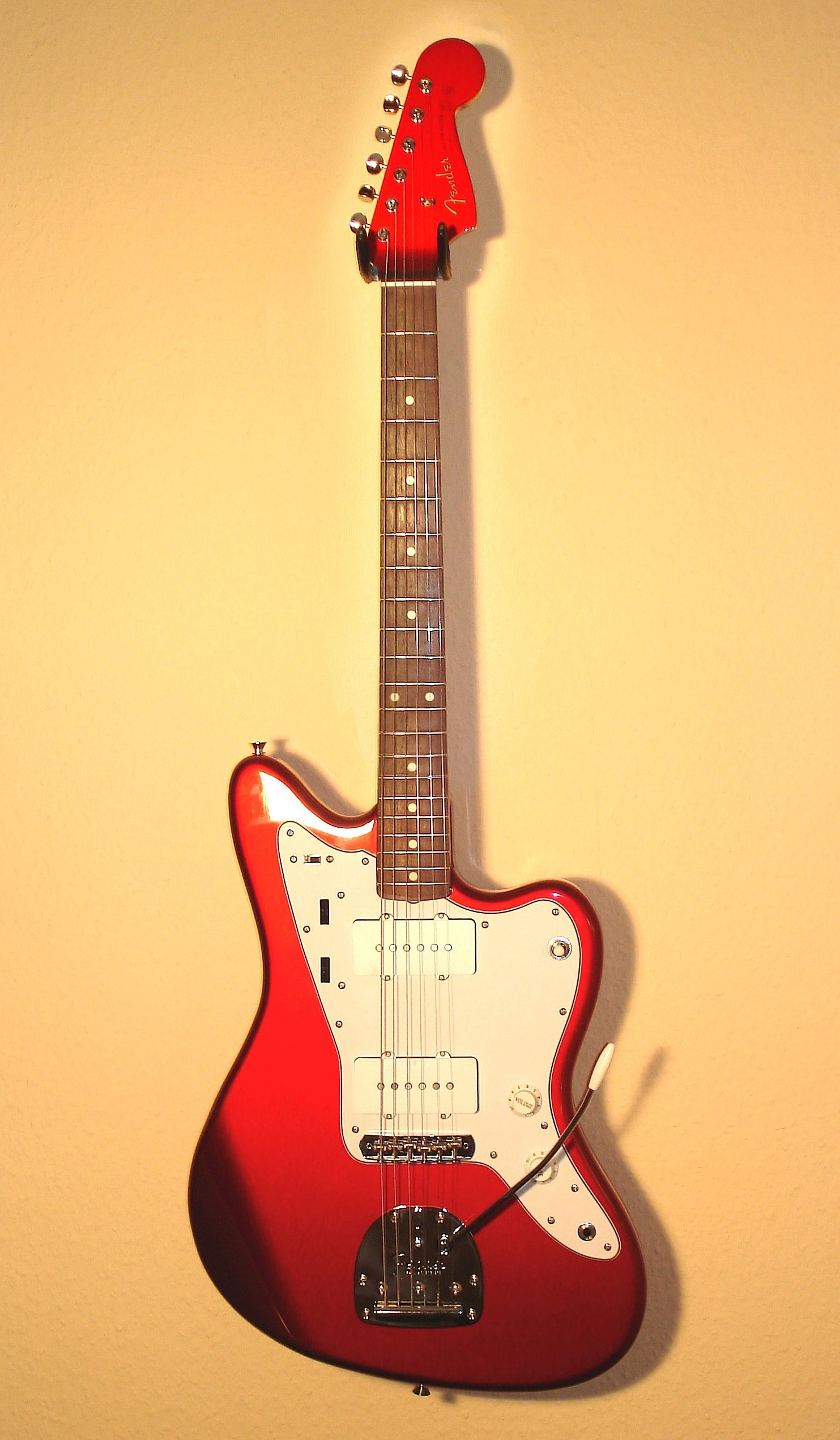
- Fender Jazzmaster
- Manufacturer: Fender
- Period: 1958; 1959–1980; 1984–present

Construction
- Body type: Solid
- Neck joint: Bolt-on
- Scale: 25.5 in (647.7 mm)

Woods
- Body: Alder; Ash; Basswood
- Neck: Maple
- Fretboard: Maple; Rosewood; Pau Ferro; Ebony

Hardware
- Bridge: "Floating" proprietary Vibrato
- Pickup: Two Jazzmaster pickups

Colors available
- Various 2- or 3-color sunbursts Shades of blonde Various shades of white, blue, red, green, etc.

The Fender Jazzmaster is an electric guitar designed as a more expensive sibling of the Fender Stratocaster. First introduced at the 1958 NAMM Convention, it was initially marketed to jazz guitarists, but found favor among surf rock guitarists in the early 1960s. Its appearance is similar to the Fender Jaguar, though it is tonally and physically different in many technical ways, including pickup design, scale length and controls.

== Development ==
The Jazzmaster's contoured "offset-waist" body was designed for comfort while playing the guitar in a seated position, as many jazz and blues artists prefer to do. A full 25.5-inch (647.7 mm) scale length, 'lead' and 'rhythm' circuit switching with independent volume and tone controls, a 'floating tremolo' (which actually produces vibrato) with vibrato lock, and a uniquely designed bridge were other keys to the guitar's character. The vibrato lock can be manually activated to reduce the detuning of the guitar if one string breaks. The Jazzmaster also had an extra-long vibrato arm. The bridge and vibrato construction are very different from that of the Stratocaster, and gives the Jazzmaster a different resonance and generally less sustain. The bridge sits on two fulcrum points and moves back and forth with the vibrato motion. Aftermarket versions that provided more sustain and less buzz were created during the 2000s by companies such as Mastery, Staytrem, Halon and Descendant.

The body is larger than that of other Fender guitars, requiring a more spacious guitar case. The Jazzmaster has unique wide, white 'soapbar' pickups that are unlike any other single coil guitar pickup. Although they closely resemble Gibson's P-90 pickups, they are constructed differently; the P-90 has its magnets placed underneath its coil, whereas the pole pieces of the Jazzmaster pickup are magnets themselves. Also, the JM coil is wound flat and wide, even more so than that of the P-90. This is in contrast to Fender's usual tall and thin coils. This 'pancake winding' gives them a warmer thicker tone without losing their single coil clarity. Additionally, due to the pickups being reverse-wound, the pickups provide a 'hum cancelling' effect in the middle pickup position. This position eliminates the typical AC hum that is inherent in most single-coil pickups. The Jazzmaster has a mellower, 'jazzier' tone than the Stratocaster, although it was not widely embraced by jazz musicians. Instead, rock guitarists adopted it for surf rock. The Ventures, The Surfaris, and The Fireballs were prominent Jazzmaster users.

One of the Jazzmaster's notable features is the pickup circuit featuring unusual "roller" thumbwheel controls and a slide switch at the upper neck end of the pickguard. The slide switch selects between two different pickup circuits, the "lead" and "rhythm" circuits. When the switch is in the lead position, the guitar's tone is controlled by the conventional tone and volume knobs and the pickup selector switch. When it is in the rhythm position, it selects the neck pickup only with the brightness rolled off slightly due to different values of the potentiometers (500kΩ vs 1MΩ in the lead circuit), and the volume and tone are controlled by the two thumbwheels; the other controls are bypassed. The intention was that this circuit would allow the performer to quickly switch to a "preset" volume and tone setting for rhythm playing. The lead circuit potentiometer values also stray from Fender's usual specifications. Up until the introduction of the Jazzmaster, Fender used 250kΩ potentiometers on their guitars. The Jazzmaster's lead circuit uses 1MΩ potentiometers instead, contributing to its unique tonal characteristics. As a concession to its more conservative audience, the Jazzmaster was the first Fender guitar carrying a rosewood fingerboard instead of maple. The fingerboard had "clay dot" position inlays and was glued onto the maple neck.

Some early pre-production/prototype examples came with a one-piece maple neck, others with an ebony fingerboard, or a black painted aluminum pickguard. Longtime Fender associate George Fullerton owned a 1957 Fiesta Red pre-production body coupled with an unusual and experimental fretboard manufactured in 1961 using vulcanised rubber — reportedly one of two ever made. Rosewood became a standard fretboard material on other Fender models around 1959. The walnut 'skunk stripe' which covers the truss-rod channel on the back of one-piece necks, is absent where the truss-rod was installed from the top, and the rosewood fretboard glued on afterwards.

=== CBS era ===
As with many other Fender models, there are significant differences between pre-CBS models and models made after the CBS acquisition of Fender. The changes implemented by CBS after their purchase of Fender were largely universal, and the Jazzmaster was no exception.

From 1968 until the model was discontinued in 1980, it remained largely unchanged.

=== Discontinuation and resurgence ===
After years of dwindling sales, with instruments being pieced together from leftover factory stock, the Jazzmaster was officially discontinued in September 1980, but has since then been re-released in many forms and modifications. The Jazzmaster was re-introduced in 1986 as a 1962 reissue model from Fender's Japanese factory, with a 1966 model existing parallel to it (with block inlays and binding, but paired with a small pre-CBS headstock). The American Vintage Reissue Series version was introduced in 1999, also based on the 1962 model. In 2007 Fender released a 'thin skin' Jazzmaster reissue with thinner vintage nitrocellulose finish. The 1962 model was discontinued in favor of a 1965 model which was equipped with a bound neck and a veneer fretboard when the American Vintage Series were revamped in 2012.

Fender revamped their Jazzmaster offerings and makes the following models. Starting at the bottom with the Squier Affinity Series, a traditional Jazzmaster with Seymour Duncan-designed wide single coil pickups, Squier Classic Vibe 60's Jazzmaster and there is also the Mexican Classic Player series which have a vibrato-unit closer to the bridge, a reworked bridge and hot P90 pickups, the Classic Lacquer series with AV65 pickups and the traditional appointments, and the American Special, and American Professional series which both omit the rhythm-circuit, opting for a single circuit layout.

== Influence ==
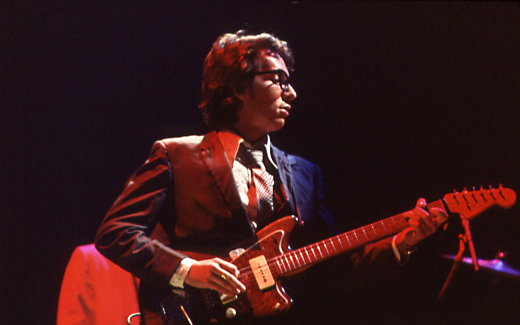
Elvis Costello playing his Jazzmaster at Massey Hall, Toronto in 1978

Fender intended the Jazzmaster to represent a solid body alternative to the hollow body archtop guitars that were then ubiquitous among jazz guitarists. As the Telecaster and Stratocaster had done in other popular musical genres, Fender hoped to initiate a revolution in jazz guitar, at the expense of competitor Gibson. While the Jazzmaster never caught on among its intended audience, it was most successful in the burgeoning Southern California-based surf music and instrumental rock scene of the late 1950s and early 1960s. Fender headquarters were located in Southern California, and Leo Fender himself actively solicited local players' input and guidance in designing the Jazzmaster's followup, the Jaguar.

Jazzmasters, along with Jaguars and their imitators, fell out of fashion among players during the 1970s largely due to their "old-fashioned" appearance and sonic characteristics. The 70s rock sound meant "fat" humbucker tone and much sustain, so guitarists gravitated toward the Gibson Les Paul and its copies. Fender continued to offer the Jazzmaster as part of its product line until 1980.

Just as Fender discontinued the Jazzmaster, Tom Verlaine of Television and Elvis Costello started giving the guitar a cult following. Consequently, the Jazzmaster would soon be embraced by the American indie rock scene.

=== Notable players ===
- Neko Case plays a 1960 Jazzmaster previously owned and played by Pops Staples.
- Nels Cline of Wilco plays "WATT", a 1959 Jazzmaster once owned by Mike Watt of the Minutemen and Firehose.
- Elvis Costello
- Jessica Dobson of the Shins and Deep Sea Diver plays a Jazzmaster.
- Sam Fender
- Adam Granduciel of the War on Drugs
- Robin Guthrie of Cocteau Twins
- Inoran of Luna Sea uses his signature "Road Worn" model
- Ira Kaplan of Yo La Tengo
- Jesse Lacey of Brand New
- Troy Van Leeuwen of Queens Of The Stone Age
- Clara Luciani
- J Mascis of Dinosaur Jr.
- Tomo Milicevic of Thirty Seconds To Mars
- Thurston Moore and Lee Ranaldo of Sonic Youth
- Marcus Mumford of Mumford & Sons
- Grant Nicholas of Feeder
- Ric Ocasek of the Cars
- David Rhodes, guitarist with Peter Gabriel, Random Hold and Blancmange
- Russell Senior of Pulp
- Kevin Shields of My Bloody Valentine
- Robert Smith of the Cure played a Jazzmaster with a Woolworth Top 20 guitar pickup installed.
- Pops Staples of The Staple Singers
- Chris Stapleton, singer, songwriter and guitarist
- Alex Turner of Arctic Monkeys
- Tom Verlaine of Television
- Don Wilson and Bob Bogle of the Ventures
- Ian Fowles of The Aquabats
- Madison Cunningham
- Thom Yorke of Radiohead
- Adam Franklin of Swervedriver

== Imitations and Fender reissues ==
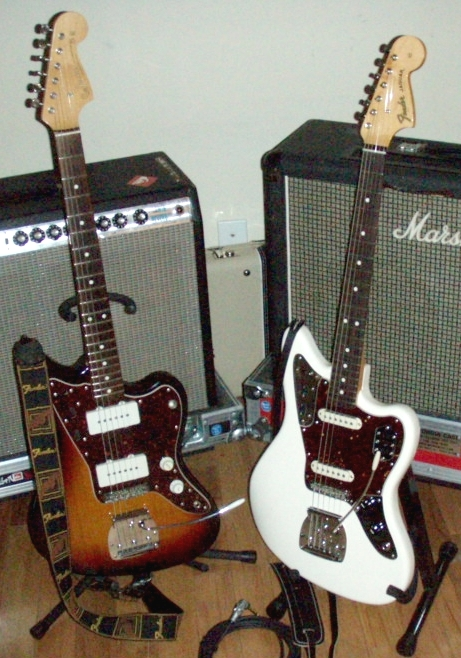
A Fender Jazzmaster (left) and Fender Jaguar (right)

There are a wide array of budget-priced Jazzmaster imitations, particularly from the 1960s and '70s. Eko, Greco, Dillion, Univox, Epiphone, Yamaha, Framus, Teisco, Aria, Jansen, Harmony, and National are but some of the brands who released guitars in the spirit of the Jazzmaster, mainly to capitalize on the surf rock sound of the 1960s. Most of these manufacturers took inspiration from the Jazzmaster, but made significant changes to their finished product before bringing them to market. Foreign Jazzmaster inspired guitars with faithful pickup variants are rare, though examples of nearly identical tremolo systems were far more common.

It wasn't uncommon to see modern copy variants replace the Jazzmaster's signature bridge and tremolo setup with a Stratocaster-derived assembly. This modification is in the 1990s Japanese Squier Vista Series Jagmaster guitar. Fender has since introduced more faithful recreations of the original Jazzmaster, with genuine Jazzmaster bridge and tremolo assemblies. There are also several manufacturers of high-end Jazzmaster-styled guitars, such as Danocaster, Nash, Bilt, Rhoney and Kauer.

=== American Vintage Reissue 1962 Jazzmaster ===
American-made Jazzmasters were out of standard production entirely from 1980 to 1999. In 1999, Fender expanded the American Vintage Reissue (AVRI) series to include two offset models, one of which being a reissue of the 1962 Jazzmaster. The reissue was mostly true to the original 1962 Jazzmaster, featuring vintage-inspired pickups, hardware, a period-correct brown tolex case with a gold interior, and a variety of Custom Colors. The Custom Color Jazzmasters in this line did not feature matching headstocks, a feature that was a hallmark of the original Custom Color Jazzmasters in the 1960s. Originally, the model was offered in an array of Custom Colors, such as Candy Apple Red and Sherwood Green Metallic. However, by the end of the model's production run, Fender offered only three colors: Black, Olympic White, and Three-Color Sunburst. With the exception of the discontinuation of color options, the model remained largely unchanged from its introduction in 1999 until it was discontinued in 2012.

=== American Vintage Reissue Thin Skin Jazzmasters ===
In the late 2000s, Fender produced limited quantities of the 1962 Jazzmaster known as Thin Skins. These were almost identical in spec to the standard AVRI Jazzmasters, with the notable exception of the finish, though some, such as those offered by Wildwood Guitars in Louisville, Colorado, offered Thin Skins with a 9.5" radius in lieu of the vintage-spec 7.25". The Thin Skins were offered in a number of otherwise unavailable Custom Colors, and many of the Custom Color Thin Skins featured period-correct matching headstocks. The Thin Skins were 100% nitrocellulose, including the sealer, which was polyurethane on the normal '62 Jazzmaster. This, in addition to thinner color and clear coats, created a much thinner finish than the normal. Also offered through Wildwood was a unique model, the American Vintage Reissue Thin Skin 1959 Jazzmaster. The '59 was offered in a variety of colors, and a special version in blonde was offered featuring vintage appointments instead of the 6105 fretwire and 9.5" radius fingerboard.

=== American Vintage 1965 Jazzmaster ===
In 2012, Fender discontinued the entirety of the American Vintage Reissue (AVRI) series, including the 1962 Jazzmaster. The line was replaced by the American Vintage (AV) series. The new series featured more accurate vintage appointments, a new flash-finish method meant to create a thinner lacquer finish, and vintage-reproduction paperwork and manuals. Some improved vintage details included neck shape, thinner cases, decals, colors, pickups, tuners, and various production techniques. The American Vintage line includes a single Jazzmaster model: the 1965 Jazzmaster. In keeping with the original 1965 models, the AV 1965 Jazzmaster includes a bound neck with larger, pearloid dot inlays, matching headstocks on custom colors, and a black G&G reproduction case with black tolex and a red plush interior.

=== American Vintage Thin Skin Jazzmasters ===
As with the AVRI models, Fender offers limited production Thin Skin 1965 Jazzmasters. The hardware and accessories remain the same as normal production models, though the finishes are, as with the original Thin Skins, available in additional colors. Also, as with the AVRI Thin Skins, some '65 AV Jazzmaster Thin Skins are available with the modern 9.5" fingerboard radius and larger 6105 fretwire. Some dealers, such as Wildwood, also tout lighter body weights.

=== Fender Custom Shop Jazzmasters ===
The Fender Custom Shop also produces various Jazzmaster models, including reissues, relics, and models with modern appointments, such as flamed maple tops, humbuckers, hardtails, and modified or non-production bridges.

=== Fender Japan ===
Fender's Japanese facility produces offset-waist guitars which have been sporadically available outside Japan since the late 1980s, either from Japanese dealers willing to ship overseas, or from US dealers who have imported them. Since 1996, its Squier offshoot has manufactured a budget version called the Jagmaster.

=== Fender Mexico ===
In May 2008, Fender introduced the Classic Player Series Jazzmaster, which was made in Mexico. Fender made changes to the original design. This included replacing the bridge with a Tune-o-matic type, giving it a 9.5" fretboard radius and moving the tremolo plate around 1 cm forward towards the bridge. The tailpiece was moved forward not for cosmetic or functional reasons, but to reduce the manufacturing cost of the Jazzmaster and Jaguar guitars in the same factory. Because of the Jaguar's shorter neck length, the tailpiece is placed relatively further forward than the Jazzmaster's. To use the same jig, both guitars are made with the tailpiece in the same position, meaning the Jazzmaster's tailpiece sits closer to the bridge than it does in higher-end Fender models. This move changed the visual style of the guitar slightly making it distinct from all other Jazzmasters. While altering the visual style, the relocated tailpiece imposed solutions to two of the important setup issues in the guitar, by increasing the break angle over the saddles and increasing clearance over the tailpiece's domed screws (this is more commonly achieved by increasing bridge height with a tapered neck pocket shim, or a factory-machined angled pocket on some models). The contentious relocated tailpiece has remained in some of the Mexican Jazzmaster line ever since. Fender has also sometimes used different, specially designed P-90-type high-output single-coil pickups on limited lines. These P-90 pickups operated with a bar magnet at the base instead of the magnetized polepieces of the original pickups.

September 2010 saw the introduction of the Mexican-made Black Top Jazzmaster HS. This guitar sports a Duncan Designed single-coil Jazzmaster neck pickup and a hot vintage alnico humbucking bridge pickup, with other distinctive touches including skirted black amp knobs, a Jazzmaster tremolo tailpiece (without locking button) and a three-way toggle switch. Other features include an alder body, maple neck with 9.5"-radius rosewood fretboard, 21 medium-jumbo frets, gloss polyester finish and chrome hardware.

The Jazzmaster Standard was evolved from the Blacktop model. The Standard featured two coil-tapped Blacktop humbuckers and a Pau Ferro neck; often mistaken for Rosewood. Outside of these changes, the Standard had identical specs as the previous Blacktop model, including the relocated tailpiece. Despite numerous modernising design changes, the Standard shipped with a vintage bridge, long lambasted for its instability and frequency to buzz.

The Player Jazzmaster replaced the Standard in 2018. While specs remained similar, the neck was extended to 22 frets, pickup rings were replaced with scratchplate mountings and the humbuckers replaced with more 'vintage' voiced models. Knobs and other plastic details (excluding scratchplate) were switched from black to white.

=== Fender USA ===
In January 2013, Fender added the Carved Maple Top Jazzmaster HH to its premium Select series. The instrument features an alder body with a carved maple top, a pair of new Wide Range Special humbuckers controlled by a three-way switch, volume and tone (with push-pull S-1 switch), and an Adjusto-Matic bridge and tailpiece arrangement. It also features an innovative "channel-bound" rosewood fingerboard, in which the fingerboard itself is inlaid into the maple neck.

In 2016, Fender released a "Limited Edition American Special Jazzmaster" which featured stripped-back controls and a Bigsby B50 tremolo/tailpiece instead of the traditional Jazzmaster tremolo/tailpiece. It also had a different type of bridge. In January 2018 the American Performer Jazzmaster was introduced, featuring Yosemite pickups with Greasebucket tone circuit and a vintage-style Stratocaster tremolo bridge.

Fender's 2017 "American Professional Series" includes a new version of the Jazzmaster which has a Deep C-shaped neck with 22 narrow-tall frets and features different controls and V-Mod pickups.

Fender's 2020 "American Ultra Series" The American Ultra Jazzmaster features a unique "Modern D" neck profile, and the tapered neck heel allows easy access to the highest register. A 10"-14" compound-radius fingerboard with 21 medium-jumbo frets makes for easier soloing at the upper frets, while the Ultra Noiseless Vintage pickups and new wiring options provide a wider variety of available tones. Other features include sealed locking tuning machines, chrome hardware and bone nut

== Signature editions ==
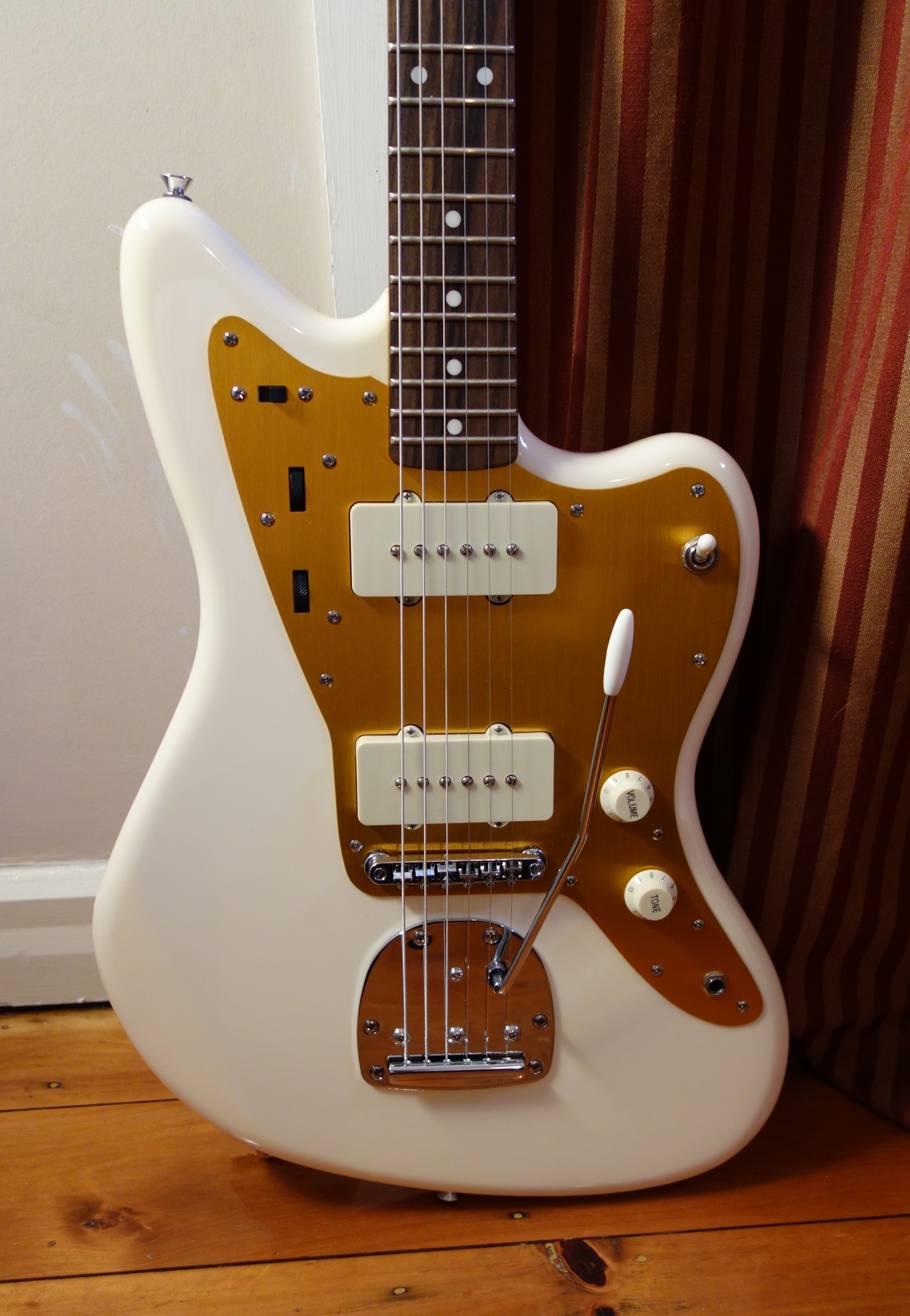
Squier J Mascis Jazzmaster

In July 2007, Fender released the J Mascis signature Jazzmaster, in honour of the Dinosaur Jr frontman. This model is much the same as previous Jazzmaster models aside from its Adjust-o-matic bridge (the Fender equivalent of the Gibson Tune-o-matic bridge), and its unusual purple sparkle finish. It was for a time the only model of Jazzmaster in production with a matching headstock, but later certain color options of the '65 American Vintage Reissue Jazzmaster appeared with that option. After the Fender version was discontinued, Squier released a J Mascis Signature with similar specifications, in antique white with a gold anodized aluminum pickguard. In the past, a Nokie Edwards (of The Ventures) signature model was produced in Japan, without rhythm circuit.

April 2008 saw the introduction of the Elvis Costello Jazzmaster, the second signature Jazzmaster model made at the Corona facility – a faithful replication of Elvis Costello's 1960s Jazzmaster used during his 1977 debut album, My Aim is True. This signature Jazzmaster guitar features a solid walnut-stain finished alder body and a modified tremolo bridge for Costello's trademark "spy movie" sound.

In June 2009, Fender announced Lee Ranaldo and Thurston Moore signature Jazzmasters, in honour of the guitarists of Sonic Youth. These models were released on July 1, 2009. Both editions have a pickup switch that operates from side to side, a black headstock, and only one volume knob. The difference lies in the pickup, bridge, colour, and the relative placement of the volume knob to the jack input. Ranaldo's instrument has a Sapphire Blue finish and features dual Fender Wide Range humbucking pickups that are re-spec'd to Ranaldo's specifications and a Mustang bridge. Moore's version features a Forest Green finish, a pair of Seymour Duncan Antiquity II Jazzmaster single-coil pickups and a Tune-o-matic bridge.

In October 2011, Fender introduced the Squier J Mascis signature Jazzmaster with gold anodized aluminum pickguard, featuring several custom specifications from J Mascis including slightly warmer "P90" sounding pickups, fast satin finished neck, and nonfloating bridge.

During the NAMM Show in January 2014, Fender debuted a Jim Root Signature Jazzmaster, based on the recommendations by the guitarist of Slipknot and formerly Stone Sour. While the guitar is a Jazzmaster by name it features none of the normal Jazzmaster accoutrements, except for the silhouette. Instead, it features high output EMG 60 and 81 humbuckers, black satin lacquered mahogany body, a single volume control with three-way pickup selector switch, a Stratocaster-style hard-tail string-through-body bridge, locking tuners, compound radius ebony fretboard, contoured neck heel and a squarer body (instead of a traditional body contours). On April 21, 2020 Fender introduced the Jim Root Jazzmaster V4, featuring a bound ebony fretboard with white rectangular block markers, satin Polar White finish and a pair of EMG Jim Root signature Daemonum open-coil active humbuckers.

During the same NAMM Show, Fender also unveiled a Troy Van Leeuwen signature Jazzmaster, in honor of the Queens Of The Stone Age guitarist. The TVL Jazzmaster is based on a late 1960s Jazzmaster, with block pearloid fretboard inlays, unique gloss Oxblood finish with matching headstock, Mustang bridge, and other late 1960s-style features including a bound rosewood fingerboard and white "witch hat" knobs. This model is also available in Copper Age with maple fingerboard, black block inlays and binding since August 25, 2020.

== Colors ==
The vintage Jazzmasters (original series) were produced in the following colors:

- Three-Color Sunburst as standard

Some available Custom Colors (this is not an all-inclusive list):

- Black
- Blonde
- Burgundy Mist Metallic
- Candy Apple Red
- Firemist Silver
- Inca Gold
- Lake Placid Blue
- Olympic White
- Shell Pink
- Sherwood Green Metallic

Vintage Jazzmasters were available in most of the common Fender Custom Colors of the era. Fender would also occasionally paint guitars in colors owners requested that were not otherwise available as 'official' Custom Colors; due to this, there are Jazzmasters in colors that deviate from Fender's offerings from the era. Additionally, many of the Custom Color Jazzmasters have matching headstocks. Blonde and sunburst models did not feature this option.

In 1999, Fender added the Jazzmaster to the American Vintage Reissue series. The American Vintage Reissue (AVRI) 1962 Jazzmaster was produced in the following colors:

- Three-Color Sunburst
- Olympic White
- Black
- Ocean Turquoise
- Surf Green
- Ice Blue Metallic

There were also limited edition variations of the American Vintage Reissue Jazzmaster available, most notably the Thin-Skin models. These models were identical to the normal production AVRI models, with the exception of the thickness of the finish (due in part to a thinner, nitrocellulose sealer), as well as additional colors and matching headstocks (though this option was not present on all Thin Skins). Some available colors:

- Aztec Gold Metallic
- Burgundy Mist Metallic
- Fiesta Red
- Shell Pink
- Sherwood Green Metallic
- Sonic Blue

Their pickguards came in Mint Green or Brown Shell colors. Jazzmasters featured bound necks with dot inlays in 1965, with block pearloid inlays from 1966 until the end of their original run in 1977; the headstocks were also larger ("CBS-style") in this era. They have featured matching headstocks (headstocks painted the same color as the body) at several points throughout the guitar's history. Matched-headstock versions generally fetch a higher price.

In 2012, Fender replaced the AVRI line with the American Vintage (AV) series. The AVRI 1962 Jazzmaster was subsequently replaced with the AV 1965 Jazzmaster. The current American Vintage Jazzmaster comes standard in the following colors:

- Three-Color Sunburst
- Olympic White

This series has also been offered in limited quantities in some of the following colors:

- Aztec Gold
- Ice Blue Metallic

As with the AVRI '62 Jazzmaster, Thin Skin models are available, also in additional Custom Colors, including:

- Aztec Gold
- Firemist Silver
- Ocean Turquoise

Like their vintage counterparts, pickguards come in Mint Green or Brown Shell colors, depending on the color.

Colors of the signature editions:

- J. Mascis – Purple Sparkle (features a matching headstock; this applies to the Japanese model only. The Squier Mascis model is antique white with gold anodized aluminum pickguard)
- Elvis Costello – Natural Brown
- Lee Ranaldo – Transparent Sapphire Blue
- Thurston Moore – Transparent Forest Green
- Troy Van Leeuwen – Gloss Oxblood & Copper Age (features a matching headstock)
- Jim Root – Polar White Satin

== Resources ==
- Fender: The Golden Age 1946–1970, by Martin Kelly, Terry Foster, Paul Kelly. London & New York: Cassell (2010) ISBN 1-84403-666-9
