= Kris Chen =

American music industry executive

Kris Chen (born October 6, 1971) is an American music industry executive, A&R, record label consultant, and entrepreneur. He is the founder of Summer Lawns Works, which partners with musicians to provide management and record-label services, including creative, marketing, and A&R. Joni Mitchell's The Hissing of Summer Lawns inspired the company's name.

== Early life and education ==
Chen was born in Los Angeles and raised in Denton, Texas by his mother. As a child, he was a classically trained violinist. As a teenager, he was a devotee of bands that were on independent British labels like The Smiths, New Order, Depeche Mode, and Cocteau Twins, getting his music tips from late 1980's issues of Spin Magazine. Chen would observe the logos on the records, note the labels, and visit record stores to find other bands on the same labels; this practice laid the foundation for his career. Chen attended Denton High School and graduated in 1989. He spent two years at the University of Texas at Austin.

== Career ==
In 1993, Chen got a job at the Sound Warehouse record store, where he regularly spoke to music distributors. In 1994, Chen became a sales assistant at Warner Music Group's Alternative Distribution Alliance (ADA) in Austin. He worked with indie record stores in Arkansas, Louisiana, Oklahoma, and Texas, expanding his understanding of the cross-functional nature of music and business.

In 1997, Chen moved to New York, where he continued to work for ADA in sales. He got a part-time job at Other Music as a sales associate.

In 2001, he joined Tommy Boy Records, where he launched their digital marketing department. He spearheaded the launch of De La Soul's first website, delasoulonline.com, in support of their sixth studio album, AOI: Bionix. Chen led their digital marketing campaign, which introduced then-innovative tactics such as a mailing list, promotional mp3s, pre-release album streams, and interviews and fan chats on AOL and Yahoo.

After Tommy Boy Records shuttered, Interpol's Daniel Kesler introduced Chen to Laurence Bell, the co-owner of Domino Records, a British independent record label based in London. Chen was hired to run sales, marketing, publicity, and finance, doing it all while working out of his apartment. In 2004, Chen expanded the American office by moving his team into a space in Dumbo. As the label manager, he worked closely with The Notwist, Caribou, Juana Molina, Four Tet. Chen worked with Franz Ferdinand, who were nominated for three Grammys at the 47th Annual Grammy Awards in 2005.

In November 2005, Chen was named Senior Vice President of A&R at XL Recordings, based in New York City. The first artist he signed was Thom Yorke, releasing The Eraser in 2006. The following year, Chen went to the Mercury Lounge, where he met Vampire Weekend. Chen was the A&R/global campaign manager for their first three albums—Vampire Weekend, Contra. and Modern Vampires of the City. Both Contra and Modern Vampires of the City debuted at #1 on the Billboard album chart. During his tenure at XL, Chen signed Sigur Rós, Tyler the Creator, Titus Andronicus. He also worked on Thom Yorke's side project Atoms for Peace, and A&R'd the 15th anniversary of The Prodigy's The Fat of the Land which featured an additional disc of remixes.

In 2016, Chen joined Nonesuch Records as Senior Vice President, continuing to sign and develop artists such as Fleet Foxes. Rostam Batmanglij left Vampire Weekend, signing with Chen to release his first solo album. In 2017, David Byrne approached Chen to gauge his interest in releasing Byrne's next record, American Utopia, which eventually became a Broadway show. In 2019, Chen signed Vagabon. Chen left Nonesuch in November 2020 after a round of layoffs at Warner Music Group.

In 2021, Chen founded Summer Lawns Works. He manages June McDoom, Hand Habits, and Hurray for the Riff Raff. He is a partner in Psychic Hotline, the label co-founded by Amelia Meath and Nick Sanborn of Sylvan Esso and their manager, Martin Anderson. That same year, Chen launched the Matsor Projects label with Rostam Batmanglij. In 2021, Chen began serving as a label consultant for Verve as the A&R for LA LOM, Daniele Luppi, The Messthetics and James Brandon Lewis, and Madison Cunningham, ushering her sophomore album, Revealer, to a 2023 Grammy win for Best Folk Album.

== Personal ==
In 2021, Chen left New York and moved back to Los Angeles, where he lives with his wife and two cats.
