= Billboard Heart =

Studio album by Deep Sea Diver
- Released: February 28, 2025
- Genres: Dream pop; indie rock
- Length: 45:34
- Label: Sub Pop
- Producers: Jessica Dobson; Andy D. Park

Deep Sea Diver chronology
Impossible Weight (2020)	Billboard Heart (2025)

Singles from Billboard Heart
- 1. "Billboard Heart" Released: September 19, 2024; 2. "Shovel" Released: January 7, 2025; 3. "Let Me Go" Released: February 5, 2025

Billboard Heart is the fourth studio album by the American indie rock band Deep Sea Diver. It was released on February 28, 2025, through Sub Pop.

== Background ==
The album consists of three singles, "Billboard Heart", "Shovel", and "Let Me Go", with the first single peaking on the Billboard Adult Alternative Airplay chart at number 40. The music video for the lead single, "Billboard Heart", which was released together with the single, was directed by the band members, Jessica Dobson and Peter Mansen, along with cinematographer Tyler Kalberg.

== Reception ==
Professional ratings
Review scores
Source	Rating
AllMusic	4/5 stars
Clash	7/10
New Noise Magazine	3/5 stars
Paste	7.6/10
Under the Radar	8/10 stars

AllMusic reviewed Billboard Heart, stating "Throughout, Dobson's passionate, punk-inflected vocals, flaws-and-all instrumental takes, and an actively-burning-out vibe sell songs that are anxious even in affectionate moments."

New Noise Magazine gave the album a 3-star rating and remarked "Billboard Heart is like a self-help book contextualized in music. It combats the internal struggles within ourselves that makes us cower in fear."

Ben Jardine of Under the Radar described it as having the "trademarked sense of weightlessness" as the band's previous albums, stating "it’s also earmarked by crunchier guitars, soaring synths, and the occasional heavy drum fill."

Paste magazine wrote a review about Billboard Heart, stating it is "full of snappy lyrics, impeccable guitar-playing and crisp synthwork in a tight clasp, and the result is indie rock that sounds like it was made with both the confidence of a 22-year-old bursting onto the scene and the wisdom of a veteran player."

Clash magazine commented about the album, "it sees the group at the top of their game delivering an ambitious, eclectic eleven tracks that really showcase Jessica Dobson and co’s songwriting and musicianship."

== Track listing ==
Billboard Heart track listing
No.	Title	Writer(s)	Length
1.	"Billboard Heart"	Jessica Dobson	5:07
2.	"What Do I Know"	Dobson; Peter Mansen; Elliot Jackson; Yuuki Matthews	3:57
3.	"Emergency"	Dobson; Mansen; Jackson; Matthews	4:13
4.	"Shovel"	Dobson; Mansen	4:29
5.	"Tiny Threads"	Dobson; Mansen; Adam Schatz	5:21
6.	"Loose Change"	Dobson	2:50
7.	"Always Waving Goodbye"	Dobson	3:21
8.	"Let Me Go" (featuring Madison Cunningham)	Dobson; Madison Cunningham	4:42
9.	"Be Sweet"	Dobson	3:53
10.	"See in the Dark"	Dobson; Mansen	3:52
11.	"Happiness Is Not a Given"	Dobson	3:49
Total length:			45:34

== Personnel ==
Credits adapted from the album's liner notes.

=== Deep Sea Diver ===
- Jessica Dobson – vocals, production (all tracks); electric guitar (tracks 1, 3–5, 7–10), additional engineering (1, 3, 5, 8), synthesizer (1, 4–6), bass (2, 3, 6, 7, 9–11), engineering (2, 6, 9), guitars (2, 6), additional synthesizer (2), percussion (3, 9), Omnichord (5), piano (7, 9–11); acoustic guitar, Wurlitzer (7); Casio synthesizer (11), Polaroids
- Peter Mansen – drums (1–7, 9–11), percussion (2, 4, 5, 10), drum machine (4), electric guitar (5); Mellotron, synthesizer (8); Polaroids
- Elliot Jackson – synthesizer (1–5, 7, 10, 11), crowd sound sample (5), percussion (10), Polaroids

=== Additional contributors ===
- Andy D. Park – production, engineering, mixing (all tracks); drum tape loop (2), synth bass (4, 7, 9), drum machine programming (4); drum machine, bass (8); drum programming (9); glockenspiel, additional piano (11)
- Greg Calbi – mastering
- Steve Fallone – mastering
- Levi Seitz – vinyl mastering
- Adam Schatz – additional production (1, 4), synthesizer (1)
- Carly Bond – engineering assistance
- Samuel Rosson – engineering assistance
- Yuuki Matthews – bass (1, 4)
- Greg Leisz – steel guitar (1, 5)
- Abby Gunderson – strings (6, 9)
- Caroline Rose – background vocals (6, 11)
- Madison Cunningham – background vocals (7, 11), acoustic guitar (7); vocals, electric guitar (8)
- Sean O'Brien – engineering (1, 4)
- Neil Krug – cover photo
- Tyler Kalberg – back cover photo
- Elliot Jackson – gatefold photo
- Dusty Summers – design, layout

== Charts ==
Chart performance for Billboard Heart
Chart (2025–2026)	Peak position
Croatian International Albums (HDU)	35
UK Album Downloads (Official Charts)	77
