= Ace (Madison Cunningham album) =

Studio album by Madison Cunningham
- Released: October 10, 2025
- Studios: Allaire (Ulster County); The Nest (Brooklyn) (Note: Strings recorded at Smilo Sound in Brooklyn, NY.)
- Genres: Chamber pop; folk
- Length: 53:10
- Label: Verve Forecast
- Producers: Madison Cunningham; Robbie Lackritz

Madison Cunningham chronology
Cunningham Bird (2024)	Ace (2025)

Singles from Ace
- 1. "My Full Name" Released: August 15, 2025; 2. "Wake" Released: September 12, 2025; 3. "Break the Jaw" Released: October 8, 2025

Ace is the third (Note: Ace is officially considered to be Cunningham's third studio album. However, it is her fourth if her since-deleted 2014 album Authenticity is included.) studio album by American musician Madison Cunningham. It was released on October 10, 2025, through Verve Forecast Records. The album was produced by Cunningham and Robbie Lackritz, with recording taking place at Allaire Studios in Ulster County and The Nest in Brooklyn. Its material was written following a period of personal upheaval for Cunningham, including a divorce and a period of writer's block. Musically, the album heavily utilizes piano as well as woodwind and string arrangements, contrasting with the guitar-centric sound of Cunningham's previous works.

Ace was released to critical acclaim, with praise being directed towards Cunningham's vocals, songwriting, and instrumental performances. Three singles were released in promotion of the album—"My Full Name", "Wake" (with Fleet Foxes' Robin Pecknold), and "Break the Jaw"—with the latter being Cunningham's first entry on a Billboard chart. To promote the album, Cunningham embarked on a 2025-26 tour of the US, Canada and Europe.

== Background ==
Ace follows up Cunningham's collaboration with singer-songwriter Andrew Bird, Cunningham Bird (released the previous year), which is a track-by-track cover of Buckingham Nicks (1973), as well as Cunningham's second studio album Revealer (2022), the latter of which won a Grammy Award for Best Folk Album. An October 2025 New York Times article recalled an experience Cunningham had of meeting guitarist Wendy Melvoin two years prior, when Melvoin played "Bloody Mother Fucking Asshole" by Martha Wainwright for Cunningham, which she later cited as a heavily emotional experience leading her to recognize "all this anger in me that had gone unexpressed". Six months after the meeting, Cunningham and her husband would divorce. 2024 would be a period of personal struggle for Cunningham, both due to writer's block and the dissolution of her marriage. Of the experience, Cunningham stated: "In some ways, it felt natural. I knew how to slide into it and embody it... And then in other ways, I just felt like I wanted to cower. I just felt so klutzy to be a single person for the first time at 27-years-old."

== Writing and recording ==
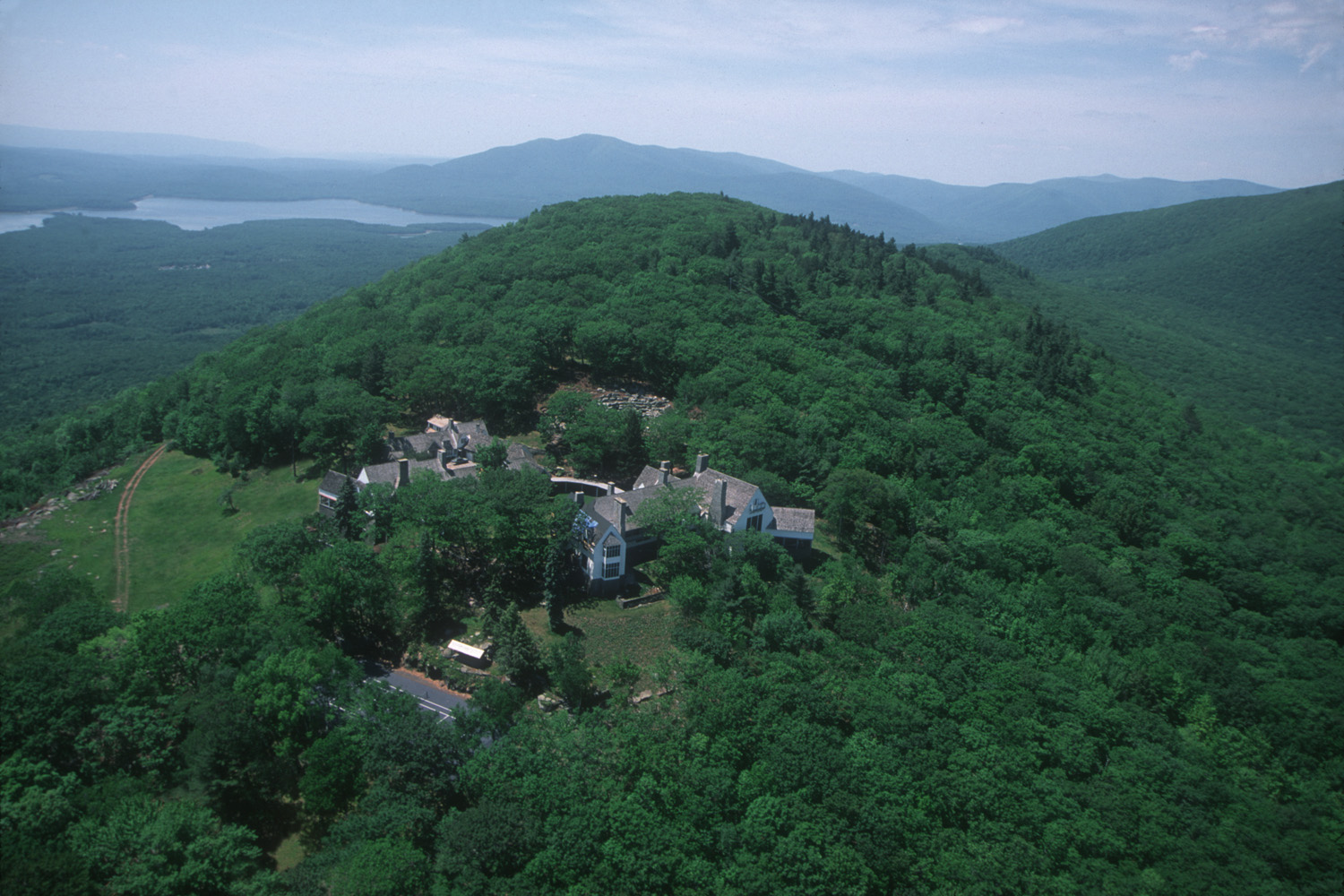
Ace was partially recorded at Allaire Studios, located within the Glen Tonche estate in Ulster County, New York.

Cunningham wrote the majority of the songs which appear on Ace in August 2024. Every song on the album would be written in an alternate tuning (CGDFAC, tuned down a half-step for "Break the Jaw"), which she found challenging to use at first until she found specific voicings. "My Full Name" was one of the first songs written for the album, during a blizzard in Nashville; "Wake" was written at this time as well. Cunningham still felt that she "could not write" for much of 2024, until this period ended in July. She has stated that she mostly did not listen to music other than country during this period of writing, finding the genre "holds this really profound sadness, but it's wrapped in this very jolly package". She also took inspiration from nature, particularly a river trail near her home. Once written, she would perform much of the new material live throughout early 2025, before the album had been announced. All of the songs on the album were originally written on guitar, with some then being transitioned to piano. Songs that were ultimately recorded on guitar were played in an alternate tuning which was new to Cunningham.

"Take Two" was written as Cunningham's last-minute contribution to a weekly songwriting club, while "Break the Jaw" originated from a band jam. While most songs on the album were completed within a couple of days, "Beyond That Moon" was written over a period of months, being started in March 2024 and completed in the fall. The song was developed through live performance, and was initially, according to Cunningham, "too sentimental and rocky", leading her to move the song to piano, and then to its final arrangement centered around "a more orchestral approach" in regards to her guitar playing. Recording sessions for the album commenced just two months after the bulk of the material had been written. In comparison to the recording process of her previous albums, Cunningham created pre-determined guidelines for her and the musicians to follow when making the record. She made an effort to not "give a shit" about the public's preconceptions based on her previous work or worry about outside expectations.

Ace is the first full album to be recorded using Cunningham's touring band; they were previously featured on the non-album single "Subtitles" (2023). While rehearsals took place, full-band demos were not recorded, nor vocal comps, as all vocal tracks were to be recorded live. Cunningham made note of her and the band's "crazy" work schedule, in which the "skeleton" of a song would be started in the morning, and then recording would continue up until two in the next morning to finish it. Instrumentally, Cunningham utilized a nylon-string guitar for much of the album, as well as a Collings acoustic and a hollow-body electric (the latter being used on "Break the Jaw"). She also played electric bass on "Golden Gate (On and On)" and "Mummy", with the former being composed on the instrument. Robin Pecknold of Fleet Foxes was recruited for a second vocal on "Wake", as Cunningham felt the presence of a second vocalist was needed "to avoid any notion of revenge" within the song.

== Music and lyrics ==
The music on Ace has been described as chamber pop and chamber folk. Many publications have described the album as a diversion from Cunningham's previous works, due to the greater emphasis on piano, as well as string and woodwind arrangements. Despite being written about, and in the wake of, her divorce, Kate Ratner of The Line of Best Fit noted that Ace is "not a puff piece nor a revenge album", with Cunningham instead "seek[ing] to honour this closed chapter of her life, in its highest and lowest moments". Cunningham herself stated that she intended to "express myself truthfully", while also "leaving room for the other perspective". AllMusic noted optimism within the lyrics, characterizing Ace as "a break-up album, certainly, but one that carries the hope and promise of a spring day that still bears traces of the winter behind it".

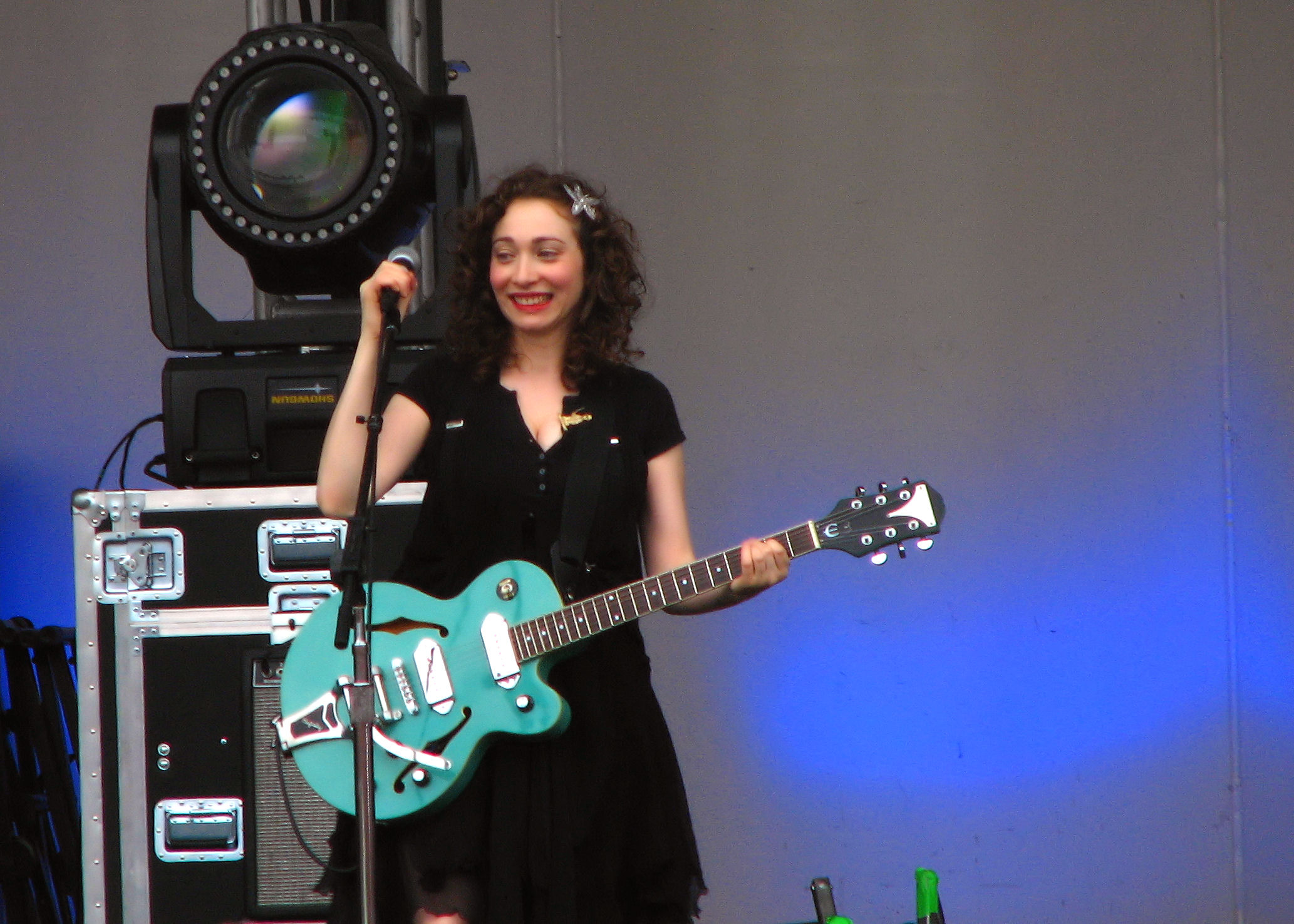
Some reviewers have compared "Mummy" and "My Full Name" to the work of Regina Spektor.

Ace begins with "Shatter into Form", an instrumental which Caroline Nieto of Paste states is defined by its "listless piano". "Shore" is another piano-centric track with minimalist production, with Nieto characterizing it by its simplicity which then unfolds into a "sprawling ballad". Zoë White of The Skinny likens Cunningham's vocals to that of Joni Mitchell, while instrumentally, the song is highlighted by "flighty" woodwinds and "showering cymbals". "Skeletree" contains a "dense groove", with lyrics that Hannah Jocelyn of Pitchfork considers to be an example of the undertones of "grief and animosity" within many of the record's more low-key songs. Trev Elkin of God Is in the TV describes its chorus as "pop-leaning" and seemingly "springing from nowhere", while White compares the track's "gritty, guitar-led momentum" to Cunningham's work on Revealer. Nieto defines the song through its "chugging" percussion, layered guitars, and "offbeat" melody, while comparing it to earlier Cunningham songs such as "Anywhere" and "Trouble Found Me".

Jocelyn likens "Mummy" to a "whimsical lullaby", while also making comparisons to the "artiser moments" of Regina Spektor's work. Pieto opines that its lyrics expand on the themes of "residual, beckoning love" previously explored on "Shore". This track is followed by "Take Two", which has been described as one of the album's most "stripped-down" songs. Ratner describes "Wake" as "a conversation between partners" heading towards a relationship's dissolution. Featuring harmony vocals by Pecknold, the two vocalists "wrestle with the earliest stages of grief", with a string arrangement Ratner compares to Sufjan Stevens' "Mystery of Love". Cameron Knowler of The Bluegrass Situation likens the song to a variety of works including Raising Sand (2007) by Alison Krauss and Robert Plant, the collaborative work of Gillian Welch and David Rawlings, and composer Gustavo Santaolalla. Jocelyn notes the juxtaposition between "Wake" being an "earthy acoustic song" with an "uneasy melody", characterized by Pecknold's "dissonant" harmonies which she compares to the work of Simon & Garfunkel. "Break the Jaw" has been compared to the work of Fiona Apple, while Pieto states the song "conveys anxiety like a pounding heartbeat" which leads Cunningham to "confront the pain she has endured and inflicted" through its "pattering snare".

Ratner notes "Invisible Chalk" as the moment on the album which reaches "the deepest point of Cunningham's forest of sorrow and overcoming", finding "balance between anger and 'that very earnest character of longing and wanting someone and feeling alone'". Ratner describes the track as "soft and whimsical, yet hold[ing] a profound sense of emptiness". This is followed by "Shatter into Form II", another piano-based instrumental. White likens "My Full Name" to the "intimate art pop" of Spektor, while Elkin considers it to be Cunningham's "quietest and most complete" song. Pieto describes its atmosphere as "simple and soft", defining its lyrical theme as "a reclamation of identity, a declaration that falling for someone doesn't mean losing yourself". Cunningham considers the track to be "the main artery" of Ace. Elkin defines "Golden Gate (On and On)" by its "restless energy" and "anxious cadence", citing the interaction between Cunningham's voice and the woodwind arrangement. "Beyond That Moon" displays the influence of 1970s soft rock, with Jocelyn deeming the track to be one of the album's "more conventional" moments. Elkin also notes the track as a more relaxed moment which "looks skyward rather than in" with its lyrics, while White describes the song as "symphonic". Conversely, White characterizes "Goodwill" as "bustling and animalistic". The album concludes with "Best of Us". Ratner considers this track to be the moment on the album which "embodies the final stage of grief: acceptance". The lyrics see Cunningham "recognize that the relationship is over, but it no longer feels like a tragedy".

== Release and reception ==
Cunningham explained the album's title in an interview with Pleaser magazine, stating she first chose it "because I just liked the word" and due to an appreciation for one-syllable titles; she also stated the title had been "on an album title list for years, and it felt like it made sense with this body of work". She also commented on the symbolic meaning of the title, noting that the ace can be "the strongest or the weakest" card, depending on the game.

"My Full Name" was selected as the album's lead single and released on August 15, 2025; a press release announcing the album was also posted to Cunningham's official website around this time. This was followed by "Wake", with which a tour was announced for the upcoming album. The third and final single from the album, "Break the Jaw", was released on October 8; Cunningham promoted the album with a performance on Jimmy Kimmel Live! that same week. "Break the Jaw" would become Cunningham's first single to reach a Billboard chart, peaking at number 25 on the Adult Alternative Airplay chart. The album was released on October 10, and a few weeks later, reached number 31 on the UK Americana Albums Chart.

=== Critical reception ===
Professional ratings
Aggregate scores
Source	Rating
Metacritic	81/100
Review scores
Source	Rating
AllMusic	4/5 stars
God Is in the TV	8/10
Paste	8/10
Pitchfork	7.5/10
The Skinny	4/5 stars
Uncut	4/5 stars

Ace was a critical success upon release. According to the review aggregator Metacritic, Ace received "universal acclaim" based on a weighted average score of 81 out of 100 from six critic scores. Writing for Paste, Caroline Nieto gave the album a rating of 8 out of 10, declaring it to be Cunningham's best release to date. She praised the album as a "wonderful exercise in storytelling that stretches beyond lyricism, weaving meaning into its arrangements as much as its outlined themes". Timothy Monger of AllMusic deemed Ace to be the record in which Cunningham "found her true voice", highlighting "Shore" and "My Full Name" as "standouts" and "some of the most direct and emotionally affecting songs she's released". Monger also compared the record favorably to its predecessor, opining that it "finds balance" whereas Revealer "occasionally spill[s] into showy musical prowess".

Zoë White of The Skinny praised Cunningham's ability to incorporate strings and woodwinds without "overwhelm[ing the] simply lovely melodies under sweeping layers of orchestration". Pitchfork writer Hannah Jocelyn perceived the album to be "quieter and less accessible" than Cunningham's previous work, without sacrificing the musical sophistication of past releases. She praised the lyrics for "largely avoid[ing] the clichés of the divorce postmortem", concluding that the record is "the work of a mature, controlled songwriter" which "rewards close listening". Trev Elkin of God Is in the TV considered the album to be "less like the heartbreak record it's presented as and more a redefinition of who Cunningham is". Elkin praised the production for adding to the album's narrative "without hyperbole or gloss", and characterized the record as "a quieter kind of risk, a record made from the debris of writer's block and the decision to stop chasing cleverness".

Paolo Ragusa of Consequence picked the album as one of the best of October 2025 and declared that Cunningham "has totally outdone herself" with the record, describing it as "a collection of intricate and emotionally riveting songs that cements her as one of indie folk’s most compelling figures". While finding the ballads "enchanting", he reserved praise for the more upbeat material, such as "Golden Gate (On and On)" and "Break the Jaw". The Guardian included the album on their list of "five-star albums you may have missed" in 2025, recognizing it as Cunningham's "career-best" and praising its "vast woodwind arrangements and slicing strings".

== Track listing ==
All tracks are written by Madison Cunningham, except where noted.

Ace track listing
No.	Title	Writer(s)	Length
1.	"Shatter into Form I"		0:46
2.	"Shore"		5:30
3.	"Skeletree"		5:01
4.	"Mummy"		4:05
5.	"Take Two"		4:06
6.	"Wake" (featuring Fleet Foxes)	Cunningham; Will Taylor	4:15
7.	"Break the Jaw"	Cunningham; Kyle Crane; Philip Krohnengold; Daniel Rhine	4:08
8.	"Invisible Chalk"		3:29
9.	"Shatter into Form II"		0:50
10.	"My Full Name"		3:18
11.	"Golden Gate (On and On)"	Cunningham; Robbie Lackritz; Sam Weber	3:32
12.	"Beyond That Moon"		3:55
13.	"Goodwill"		5:06
14.	"Best of Us"	Cunningham; Weber	5:09
Total length:			53:10

== Personnel ==
Credits are adapted from Tidal.

- Madison Cunningham – vocals (2–8, 10–14), backing vocals (3, 7, 13, 14) piano (1, 2, 9, 10), upright piano (5), acoustic guitar (3, 6), electric guitar (3, 7, 13), nylon guitar (4, 6–8, 12–14), 12-string guitar (14), bass (4, 5, 11), celeste (5), stomps (6), woodwind arrangement (1–5), strings arrangement (3, 7, 11, 12, 14)
- Jesse Chandler – flute (1–5, 7–10, 12, 13), alto flute (4, 5, 7–10, 12–14), clarinet (2, 4, 5, 7–10, 12, 13), bass clarinet (2–5, 7–14), saxophone (10), celeste (4), vibraphone (4, 14), grand piano (5), pianet (5), plucked piano (7), kalimba (7), stomps (6), woodwind arrangement (1–5),
- Kyle Crane – drums (3, 4, 7, 8, 11–14), percussion (2–5, 7, 8, 10–14), timpani (5)
- Daniel Rhine – bass (3, 7, 8, 12), upright bass (2, 5, 6, 8, 10, 13, 14), bowed bass (10), U-bass (11), Moog synthesizer (7), bowed vibraphone (7), waterphone (7)
- Philip Krohnengold – piano (3, 8, 12), Mellotron (3, 7, 8, 11–13), celeste (4, 8), OP-1 (4, 14), pianet (7), vibraphone (7), ring modulator (11), strings arrangement (3, 7, 11, 12, 14)
- Sam Weber – vocals (11, 12), electric guitar (11, 12), piano (14)
- Rob Moose – violin (3, 7, 11, 12, 14), viola (3, 7, 11, 12, 14), cello (11), strings arrangement (3, 7, 11, 12, 14)
- Gabe Noel – cello (13)
- Robin Pecknold – vocals (6)
- Johanna Samuels – backing vocals (3)

== Charts ==
Chart performance for Ace
Chart (2025)	Peak position
UK Americana Albums (Official Charts)	31
