= Mike Elizondo =

American producer, songwriter, and musician

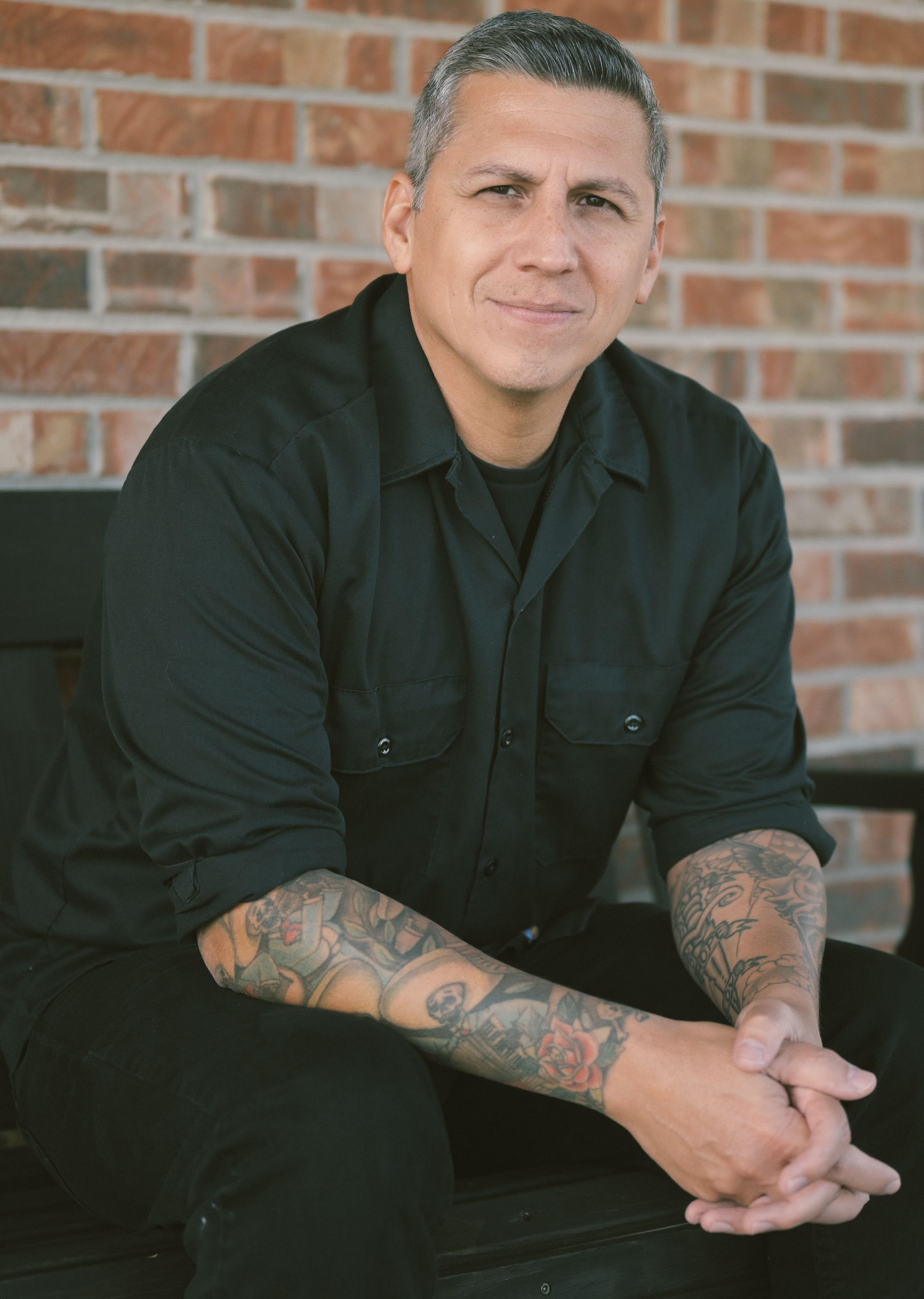
- Elizondo in 2022

Background information
- Born: Michael A. Elizondo Jr. October 22, 1972 (age 54); Pacoima, California, U.S.
- Genres: Pop; hip hop; rock; soul
- Occupations: Multi-instrumentalist; songwriter; producer
- Instruments: Keyboards; guitar; bass; drums; vocals; sitar; saxophone; accordion
- Years active: 1995–present

Michael A. Elizondo Jr. (born October 22, 1972) is an American producer, songwriter, and multi-instrumentalist. A protégé of Dr. Dre, Elizondo has worked with 50 Cent, Eminem, Linkin Park, Avenged Sevenfold, Carrie Underwood, Fiona Apple, Mastodon, Ry Cooder, Twenty One Pilots, Nelly Furtado, Brothers Osborne, Lauren Daigle, Madison Cunningham, Lin-Manuel Miranda, Sheryl Crow and Peter Gabriel, among others. His songwriting credits include "In da Club" by 50 Cent, Eminem's "Just Lose It" and "The Real Slim Shady", "Family Affair" by Mary J. Blige, and Carrie Underwood's "Cowboy Casanova". He has won three Grammy Awards from seven nominations, which includes two nominations for Producer of the Year.

== Early life and education ==
Elizondo was born and raised in Pacoima, California. His musician father, Miguel, had a diverse record collection and Elizondo grew up listening to artists from the Beatles to Motown to Johnny Cash. His father hosted jam sessions at home, and in the early 80s converted the garage into a recording studio to record local bands.

Elizondo learned to play the accordion at age 9 and the tenor saxophone at 12. At 14, he picked up the electric bass, which became his main instrument, and played in a metal band. In a 2006 interview with Sound on Sound, he said: "The reason that playing bass stuck was that the role it has, whether you're playing acoustic or electric or keyboard bass, is very appealing to me, because you are the link between the rhythm and the melody."

He went to Hamilton High School Music Academy, where he met future engineer Manny Marroquin and drummer Abe Laboriel Jr., who inspired him to devote more time to practicing in order to improve his technique. He discovered an affinity for jazz, and while he continued to play the electric bass with hardcore and metal bands he formed, in his senior year he picked up the upright bass, studying classically to understand the full scope of the instrument.

Elizondo met bassist and California State University, Northridge (CSUN) music professor Gary Pratt when Pratt guest-conducted Hamilton's jazz band. Elizondo subsequently studied privately with Pratt, who encouraged Elizondo to apply to CSUN. He was accepted, and enrolled in the university's music program in 1991.

Already well-versed in jazz and other genres of music, Elizondo's emphasis was on classical music at CSUN; as he studied with Pratt, in addition to Ed Meares, he played in chamber groups and the school orchestra. He also played in bands with musicians such as Nels and Alex Cline, Vinny Golia, Peter Erskine, and in 1994, as his extracurricular gigs became more time-consuming, he left CSUN to focus professionally on music full-time.

== Career ==
=== 1990s ===
==== Budahat, session work, The Firm, Poe ====
At CSUN, Elizondo played bass and wrote songs for Budahat, a Rock/R&B band that he founded with a childhood friend, Trevor Lawrence, Jr. In 1995, the band was signed by Atlantic. Although their album was never released, the experience provided Elizondo with an education in publishing and the record industry, and introduced him as a songwriter and musician to prominent producers including T-Bone Burnett, Glen Ballard, Matthew Wilder, and Matt Wallace. As he became more in-demand as a session musician, he played on records by artists including Sheryl Crow, Ry Cooder, Fiona Apple, Perla Batalla.

In 1996, Elizondo was booked as a session musician for the recording of The Album, by The Firm, a hip hop supergroup composed of Nas, Foxy Brown, AZ, and Nature. Produced by Dr. Dre and the Trackmasters, it was one of the first records released on Dre's then newly founded Aftermath label. The Firm sessions marked the start of Elizondo's relationship with Dre.

Elizondo met Poe through Matt Wallace in 1997, and co-wrote four songs for her second Atlantic album, Haunted, including its title track. Following the release of the album, he was signed to a publishing deal with producer Steve Lindsey, who had a co-venture with Windswept Pacific. Elizondo later said: "Steve was the one early on, who truly believed in my potential as a songwriter."

=== 2000s ===
==== Dr. Dre, Eminem, Get Rich or Die Tryin' ====
Shortly after he signed his publishing deal, Elizondo began to work steadily on Aftermath projects as part of Dre's core creative team. He played on Dre's solo album 2001 in 1999, and continued to work closely with him for the next 11 years as a multi-instrumentalist (bass, keyboards, and guitars), songwriter, and producer.

Elizondo—who was with Dre when he and Eminem met—scored his first co-writing credit with Dre for "The Real Slim Shady" from Eminem's Marshall Mathers LP. Written with Tommy Coster, Jr., the song "made Eminem a phenomenon", with The Marshall Mathers LP selling more than 1.8 million albums in its first week. "The Real Slim Shady" won a Grammy, hit the US Top 10, and entered the UK chart at No. 1. As of 2019, with more than 35 million in worldwide sales, the record was the top-selling rap album of all time.

Elizondo's first co-production credits were for "True Lies" and "Lay Low" on Snoop Dogg's 2000 album The Last Meal. Scott Storch, another of Dre's proteges, also co-produced "Lay Low". In 2003, in addition to playing bass, guitar and keyboards, Elizondo co-wrote five songs on 50 Cent's Get Rich or Die Trying, and co-wrote and co-produced the album's first and final singles, "In da Club" and "If I Can't". A "minimalist masterpiece," "In da Club" was No. 1 for nine of the 30 weeks it charted on the Billboard Hot 100, and broke the Billboard record as the most listened to song in radio history within a week of its release. It was No. 24 on the decade-long Hot 100, and #13 on the Rolling Stone list of the best songs of the decade. His run of hits continued through the end of 2004, with Mary J. Blige's "Family Affair" charting at No. 1 on the Billboard Hot 100; "Let Me Blow Ya Mind" by Eve ft. Gwen Stefani, and "Rich Girl" by Gwen Stefani featuring Eve, which hit the Top 10. He co-wrote four songs on The Eminem Show and eight songs on Eminem's Encore, including "Just Lose It", an international hit.

==== Fiona Apple, Producer of the Year, Carrie Underwood, Maroon 5 ====
As Elizondo's success in the hip hop and rap genres continued to grow, he was sought out to work with pop, rock, roots and alternative artists. In 2005, he was recruited to produce Fiona Apple's 2005 album, Extraordinary Machine. Extraordinary Machine received almost universal acclaim, with Rolling Stone writing that Elizondo had given the tracks energy, taking a "sad song and making it better." That same year, he worked with Mavis Staples, Ry Cooder, Sheryl Crow, Eric Clapton, Alice Cooper, Burt Bacharach and Avril Lavigne, and in 2006, he played, wrote and/or produced music by Mary J. Blige, Gwen Stefani, T-Bone Burnett, Doyle Bramhall II, Christina Aguilera, and P!nk. He also produced the Alanis Morissette song "Wunderkind", which appeared on The Lion, the Witch, and the Wardrobe soundtrack and was nominated in the Best Original Song category at the 2006 Golden Globe Awards.

Seeking to "toughen up their sound," Maroon 5 hired Elizondo to produce their second album, It Won't Be Soon Before Long in 2007. 17 tracks were recorded over a period of 8 months, and 14 made the record, including "If I Never See Your Face Again", featuring Rihanna, which would also appear on her album, Good Girl Gone Bad: Reloaded. The album entered the charts at No. 1 in the UK and the US, where it sold nearly 403,000 copies in its first week. The reviews were positive, with AllMusic critic Stephen Thomas Erlewine writing: "It Won't Be Soon Before Long is that rare self-stylized blockbuster album that sounds as big and satisfying as was intended." The single "Makes Me Wonder" was nominated for a Grammy, and the album was the top selling digital LP of 2007.

Similarly, Elizondo was brought in to help Rilo Kiley make their fourth album, Under the Blacklight, more rhythmic. Drummer Jason Boesel said, in discussing the title track, "Elizondo came in and answered our question of how we could get it to feel dancier. He stripped it down, and made it kind of a banger." Acknowledged as a collaborative effort between Elizondo and the band, the album earned "rave reviews" with the BBC stating that it went "one step further in its bittersweetly effortless pop."

Elizondo was nominated for the Grammy Award for Producer of the Year in 2008 based on his body of work between October 1, 2007, and September 20, 2008. The nomination brought increased attention to his multi-genre credits, resulting in a "slew of new projects that propelled him beyond the pop and hip-hop genres in which he had made his name."

Over the following two years, working frequently out of Phantom Studios, a 1000-foot recording studio Elizondo built at his home, he produced four tracks on Regina Spektor's Far; wrote with Justin Timberlake ("Love Sex Magic"), and produced Holy Smoke, the debut album by Gin Wigmore. He also worked with Jay Z and Leona Lewis. In 2009 he went to Nashville to write with Carrie Underwood, and during their second session, together with Brett James, they wrote "Cowboy Casanova." The first single from her third studio album, it was a number one hit, and went on to sell more than 2.3 million records. That same year, he wrote five songs for Eminem's Relapse—an album he also played on—and produced Switchfoot's Hello Hurricane, the album's "varied arrangements reflecting his diverse résumé." Elizondo won a Grammy Award in the Best Rock Gospel album category for his work on Hello Hurricane.

=== 2010s ===
==== Avenged Sevenfold, Warner Bros., Keith Urban ====
Avenged Sevenfold brought Elizondo in to produce their fifth album, Nightmare, in 2010. On choosing to work with Elizondo, guitarist Zacky Vengeance said: "Mike Elizondo loves Metallica, Megadeth and Iron Maiden, but he's also a musician and artist, and he's never worked on a rock album. So it seemed perfect, because we wanted to come up with something new and creative." Nightmare debuted at No. 1 on the Billboard album charts.

In January 2011, recruited by Lenny Waronker and Rob Cavallo, Elizondo was named Sr. VP of A&R and Staff Producer at Warner Bros. Records. Mainly a creative role, he focused jointly on A&R and production, working primarily with Warner Bros. artists, including Gary Clark Jr, Mastodon, Kimbra, Jenny Lewis, The Regrettes, JR JR, Eli "Paperboy" Reed, Daye Jack, and Echosmith, the first band he signed. In addition, he produced Avenged Sevenfold's follow-up to Nightmare, Hail to the King, and played on and co-produced Gary Clark, Jr.'s Blak and Blu, and in 2012 reunited with Regina Spektor to produce her album, What We Saw from the Cheap Seats.

In 2013, to "keep things fresh for himself and his fans," Keith Urban collaborated with Elizondo, who co-wrote and co-produced two tracks on his album, Fuse. A fan of Elizondo's work with Dre, in an interview with the Los Angeles Times Urban said: "He has a great rhythmic gift as a bass player, is an incredible drum programmer and multi-instrumentalist. My music is very, very rhythmic-based...I wanted to explore a much stronger presence of rhythmic elements in my music. It's something that's been there, but often has been pushed to the back." The album debuted at No. 1 in Australia and the US.

==== Twenty One Pilots, Hamilton Mixtape, Live from Here ====
In 2015, Elizondo was contacted by Lin-Manuel Miranda to develop The Hamilton Mixtape, which would be based on (but separate from) Hamilton. Using live cast recordings and a verse from Roots frontman Black Thought, Elizondo created a version of the musical's "My Shot" that became the first song on The Hamilton Mixtape, "setting the standard and attitude of the project." Elizondo also produced "Satisfied," by Sia (featuring Miguel and Queen Latifah) and Andra Day's cover of "Burn", giving it a "classic, old-school R&B vibe with hip-hop drums and overtones."

Elizondo also produced four songs on Twenty One Pilots breakout album Blurryface in 2015. The second single from the album, "Stressed Out" reached number two on the Billboard Hot 100, and was the first rock song to surpass 1 billion streams on Spotify. In 2016, with 1.5 billion views on YouTube, "Stressed Out" won the Grammy Award for Best Pop Duo/Group Performance. Blurryface hit No. 1 on the album charts, and remained in the Top 200 for more than four years straight. It was the first album in the digital era to have every track certified gold by the RIAA.

In September 2018, Elizondo became the music director of Live from Here with Chris Thile (formerly A Prairie Home Companion with Chris Thile). Elizondo played bass on several early episodes of the show and was offered the full-time music director gig in July 2018. In deciding to accept the offer—a 20-hour a week commitment, which required him to travel—he said: "On a creative level, I was extremely honored, but on a personal level, I had to figure out how to orchestrate my life. It's a lot more traveling than I'm used to. I finally realized that the energy I'm going to gain doing these shows will help fuel my enthusiasm for all the other projects I'm working on."

Among others, during the last half of the decade, Elizondo worked with Ed Sheeran, the Jonas Bros., Young the Giant, K.Flay, NF, Walk the Moon and Brantley Gilbert. He also produced Gary Clark Jr.'s cover of "Come Together" with Junkie XL for the Justice League soundtrack.

=== 2020s ===
==== Producer of the Year 2022 Grammy nomination ====
In 2021, Elizondo was nominated for the 2022 Producer of the Year Grammy Award, non-classical. The nomination is based on his body of work during the eligibility period, which included co-production on the Encanto soundtrack. Teamed with co-producer Lin-Manuel Miranda, the film's "We Don't Talk About Bruno" was #1 on the Billboard charts for 5 weeks, becoming the longest-running #1 song in Disney's history. In 2023, Encanto won the Grammy for Best Compilation Soundtrack for Visual Media.

Other notable projects during this time include Turnstile's album Glow On, which earned three Grammy nominations, Madison Cunningham's Revealer, which won Folk Album of the Year in 2023, and work with artists such as Brothers Osborne, Lauren Daigle, Lake Street Dive, Sheryl Crow, Peter Gabriel and Alessia Cara. He has also produced the Lin-Manuel Miranda and Eisa Davis concept album Warriors.

== Personal life ==
Elizondo and his wife, Trista, were married in 1997. They have four children. In 2018 the family moved from Los Angeles to Nashville. His recording studio is in Gallatin, Tennessee.

== Awards ==
=== Grammy Awards ===
Year	Nominee / work	Award	Result
2004	"In da Club" (50 Cent)	Best Rap Song	Nominated
2008	Body of work (2008)	Producer of the Year; Non-Classical	Nominated
2011	Hello Hurricane (Switchfoot)	Best Rock Gospel Album	Won
2016	Stressed Out (Twenty One Pilots)	Record of the Year	Nominated
2022	Body of work (2021)	Producer of the Year; Non-Classical	Nominated
2023	Revealer (Madison Cunningham)	Best Folk Album	Won
2023	Encanto (Various)	Best Compilation Soundtrack for Visual Media	Won
2025	Big Money (Jon Batiste)	Best American Roots Song	Nominated

=== Golden Globe Awards ===
Year	Nominee / work	Award	Result
2006	"Wunderkind" (Alanis Morissette) from The Chronicles of Narnia: The Lion, The Witch, and the Wardrobe	Best Original Song	Nominated

=== Academy of Country Music Awards ===
Year	Nominee / work	Award	Result
2010	"Cowboy Casanova" (Carrie Underwood)	Song of the Year	Nominated
