= Jonah Parzen-Johnson =

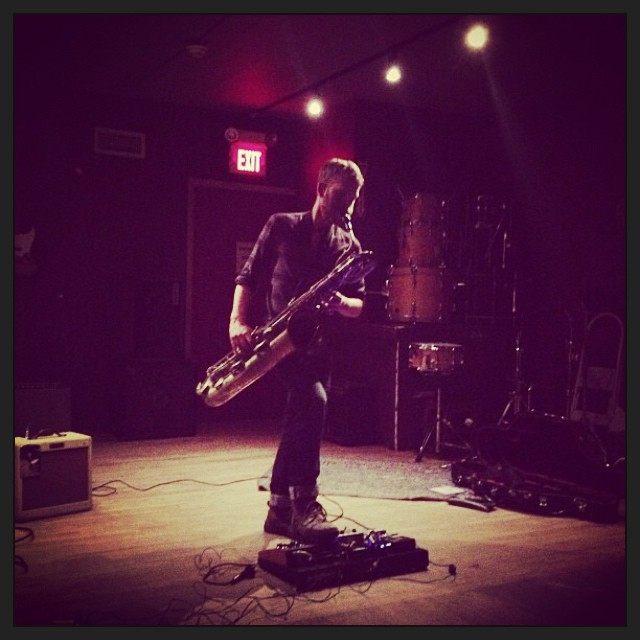

Background information
- Origin: Chicago, Illinois
- Genres: Experimental Music, Jazz
- Instruments: Baritone Saxophone, Analog Synthesizer, Elektron Digitakt
- Labels: We Jazz Records, Clean Feed Records, Primary Records
- Website: jonahpj.com

Jonah Parzen-Johnson is a baritone saxophonist based in Brooklyn, New York. He was born in Chicago, Illinois and grew up on Chicago's South Side. He completed a Bachelor of Music in jazz studies at New York University in 2010, and a Master of Music in jazz saxophone at Manhattan School of Music in 2012. In Chicago, Parzen-Johnson studied under Mwata Bowden.

Jonah Parzen-Johnson performs regularly as a solo saxophonist and his music for solo baritone saxophone and analog synthesizer, balances simple melodic passages with extended techniques including circular breathing, multiphonics, and overtones. Parzen-Johnson's solo music explores his interest in folk music and avant-jazz.

Since 2013, Parzen-Johnson has performed with an analog synthesizer built around a Moog Synthesizer VCO, and Dave Smith Instruments Mopho Module. His self-assembled synthesizer is built to follow the volume of his saxophone and a set of pedals he plays with his feet. In June 2015, Parzen-Johnson released his second solo album featuring saxophone & his custom synthesizer, and spent two months touring 34 US cities in support of the record. In an exercise to connect with people, and create empathy in all of the cities he visited, Parzen-Johnson collected three reasons to live in each city, and in November 2015 he released them as a paperback book called Three Reasons to Live Here.

In March 2024, Parzen-Johnson released his 7th solo album, "You're Never Really Alone", on We Jazz Records. Unlike his previous solo albums, this release was fully acoustic, featuring just baritone saxophone and flute with extended techniques like circular breathing and multi-phonics.

== Discography ==
As A Leader

- A Few We Remember duo with Lau Nau (We Jazz Records, 2025)
- It Was Always Time duo with Berke Can Özcan (We Jazz Records, 2024)
- You're Never Really Alone (We Jazz Records, 2024)
- Imagine Giving Up (We Jazz Records, 2020)
- Helsinki 8.12.18 (We Jazz Records, 2019)
- I Try To Remember Where I Come From (Clean Feed Records, 2017)
- Remember When Things Were Better Tomorrow (Primary Records, 2015)
- Look Like You're Not Looking - 7" (Primary Records, 2013)
- Michiana (Primary Records, 2012)

As A Co-Leader

- Berke Can Özcan and Jonah Parzen-Johnson Friendship Music For Turkey (2023)
- Zongo Junction No Discount (Electric Cowbell Records, 2014)
- Zongo Junction The Van That Got Away (Primary Records, 2012)
- Zongo Junction Thieves! (2009)
- Reed's Bass Drum Which is Which (2009)

== Bibliography ==
- Three Reasons To Live Here, Volume 1 (2015)
