= Wednesday (EP) =

EP by Madison Cunningham
- Released: November 6, 2020
- Length: 13:43
- Label: Verve Forecast
- Producer: Madison Cunningham

Madison Cunningham chronology
Who Are You Now (2019)	Wednesday (2020)	Revealer (2022)

Wednesday is the third extended play by American singer-songwriter Madison Cunningham. It was released on November 6, 2020, through Verve Forecast Records. Recorded and released during the COVID-19 pandemic, Wednesday consists of four covers of songs by Tom Waits, John Mayer, the Beatles, and Radiohead. The vinyl edition of the album contains three extra tracks – covers of Jeff Buckley and Rufus Wainwright, alongside a new original song, "Broken Harvest", whilst the "extended edition" contains the former two bonus tracks.

== Track listing ==
Wednesday
No.	Title	Writer(s)	Length
1.	"Hold On" (Tom Waits cover)	Tom Waits; Kathleen Brennan	4:27
2.	"The Age of Worry" (John Mayer cover)	John Mayer	2:46
3.	"In My Life" (The Beatles cover)	Lennon–McCartney	2:55
4.	"No Surprises" (Radiohead cover)	Thom Yorke; Jonny Greenwood; Philip Selway; Ed O'Brien; Colin Greenwood	3:35

Vinyl edition bonus tracks
No.	Title	Writer(s)	Length
5.	"Poses" (Rufus Wainwright cover)	Rufus Wainwright	4:45
6.	"Lover, You Should've Come Over" (Jeff Buckley cover)	Jeff Buckley	5:36
7.	"Broken Harvest"	Madison Cunningham	4:47

Note: While "Poses" and "Lover, You Should've Come Over are included on the digital "extended edition" of the EP, "Broken Harvest" is not.

== Personnel ==
- Madison Cunningham – vocals (all tracks), guitar (1, 2, 4, 5, 7), piano (6), bass (7), percussion (7)
- Mike Viola – vocals (3), guitar (3)
- Tyler Chester – piano (4)
