= Deep Sea Diver =

Pop rock band in Seattle, Washington

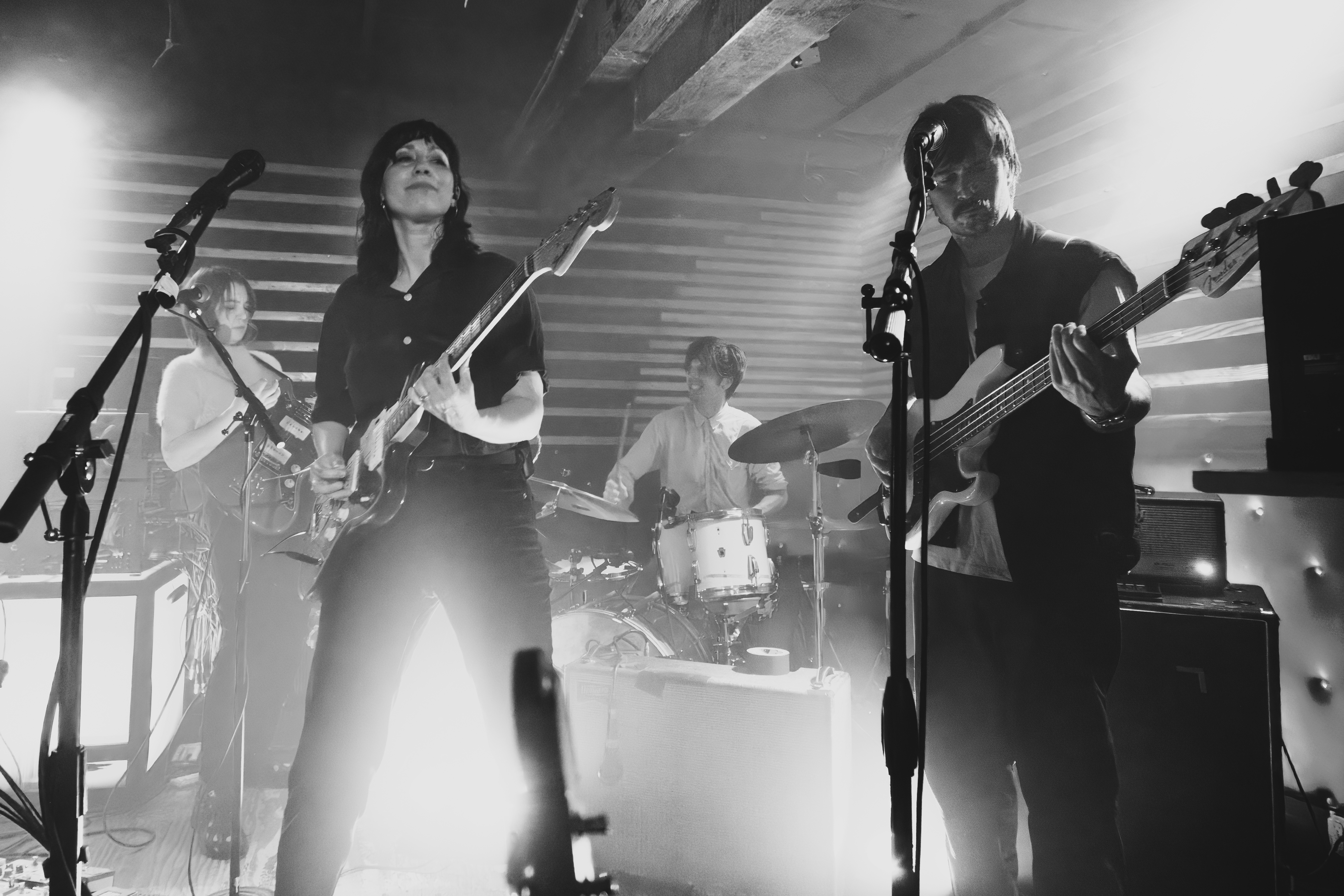
- Deep Sea Diver in 2025

Background information
- Origin: Seattle, Washington, U.S.
- Years active: 2007–present
- Labels: High Beam; ATO; Polyvinyl; Three Sirens; Sub Pop
- Members: Jessica Dobson; Peter Mansen; Garret Gue; Elliot Jackson
- Website: www.thisisdeepseadiver.com

Deep Sea Diver is an indie rock band based in Seattle. The band consists of Jessica Dobson (vocals, guitar, keys), Peter Mansen (drums), Elliot Jackson (guitar, synthesizer) and Garrett Gue (bass).

== Biography ==
In 2009, Dobson recorded and released EP New Caves under the name Deep Sea Diver, accompanied by drummer and husband Peter Mansen.

The band's first full-length debut album, History Speaks, was self-released under their label High Beam Records in 2012 while Dobson was a touring member of The Shins. A second full-length album, Secrets, was self-published in 2016.

In April 2020, while under the COVID-19 lockdown, the band recorded and released a new single, "Stop Pretending".

The band's third full-length album, Impossible Weight, was voted KEXP Seattle Listeners' Top Album of 2020.

On July 10, 2023, it was announced the band would support fellow Seattle band Pearl Jam on several dates on the band's Fall 2023 North American tour.

In September 2024, the band signed with Sub Pop.

== Band members ==
- Jessica Dobson – lead vocals (2007–present)
- Peter Mansen – drums (2007–present)
- Garrett Gue – bass guitar (c. 2012–present)
- Elliot Jackson – guitar, synthesizer (c. 2012–present)

== Discography ==
=== Albums ===
- History Speaks – May 21, 2012
- Secrets – February 19, 2016
- Impossible Weight – October 16, 2020
- Billboard Heart – February 28, 2025

=== EP ===
- New Caves – 2009
- Always Waiting – September 2, 2014
- It's Christmas Time – December 4, 2015

=== Singles ===
Title	Year	Peak chart positions	Album
Title	Year	US AAA	Album
"You Don't Own Me"	2019	—	Non-album single
"Stop Pretending"	2020	—	Non-album single
"Lights Out"	2020	—	Impossible Weight
"Impossible Weight" (featuring Sharon Van Etten)	2020	29	Impossible Weight
"Wishing"	2020	—	Impossible Weight
"Hand In My Pocket" (featuring Damien Jurado)	2021	—	Non-album single
"Stockholm Syndrome"	2024	—	Non-album single
"Billboard Heart"	2024	40	Billboard Heart
"Shovel"	2025	37	Billboard Heart
"Let Me Go" (featuring Madison Cunningham)	2025	—	Billboard Heart
"What Do I Know"	2025	40	Billboard Heart
