= Who Are You Now (album) =

Studio album by Madison Cunningham
- Released: August 16, 2019
- Studios: Apogee Studios (Santa Monica, CA); Barefoot Studios (Hollywood, CA); Sonic Ranch (El Paso, TX)
- Genre: Americana
- Length: 40:17
- Label: Verve Forecast
- Producer: Tyler Chester

Madison Cunningham chronology
For the Sake of the Rhyme (2019)	Who Are You Now (2019)	Wednesday (2020)

Who Are You Now is the first (Note: Who Are You Now is officially considered to be Cunningham's first studio album. However, it is her second if her since-deleted 2014 album Authenticity is included.) studio album by American singer-songwriter Madison Cunningham, released on August 16, 2019 by Verve Forecast. It received a Grammy Award nomination for Best Americana Album.

== Critical reception ==
Professional ratings
Review scores
Source	Rating
AllMusic	4/5 stars

In a review for AllMusic, critic Marcy Donelson gave the album 4 out of 5 stars, and wrote "mostly concerned with imperfect relationships, Who Are You Now is confident and intimate in terms of subject matter and expression throughout these variations, all of which put vocal lines front and center. And "Song in My Head" isn't the only earworm."

== Track listing ==
No.	Title	Writer(s)	Length
1.	"Pin It Down"	Madison Cunningham	4:07
2.	"Song in My Head"	Cunningham	4:40
3.	"Something to Believe In"	Cunningham; Ethan Gruska; Pete Harper	3:57
4.	"Trouble Found Me"	Cunningham; Tyler Chester	3:14
5.	"Plain Letters"	Cunningham	3:38
6.	"L.A. (Looking Alive)"	Cunningham	3:48
7.	"Dry as Sand"	Cunningham; Chester; Jay Bellerose	4:20
8.	"Like You Do"	Cunningham; Chester; Eleni Mandell	4:09
9.	"Common Language"	Cunningham; Chester	4:27
10.	"Bound"	Cunningham; Chester; Joe Henry	3:57
Total length:			40:17

== Personnel ==
Credits are adapted from the Who Are You Now liner notes.

Musicians

- Madison Cunningham — vocals; electric and acoustic guitars; vibraphone
- Tyler Chester — acoustic and baritone electric guitars; electric bass guitar; Ace Tone; piano; harmonium, Wurlitzer 140B; vibraphone; Mellotron; keyboard bass; percussion; timpani
- Alan Hampton — upright, electric and Guild Asbury bass; backing vocals
- Abe Rounds — drums; percussion; Roland TR-606; backing vocals
- Ted Poor — drums; percussion
- Gabe Witcher — violin

Production and artwork

- Tyler Chester – producer
- David Boucher — engineer; mixer
- Mario Ramirez — assistant engineer
- Mauro Castro — assistant engineer
- Tim O'Sullivan — assistant mix engineer
- Tejas Leier Heyden — production assistant
- Eric Boulanger — mastering engineer
- Joe Spix — art direction
- Jacob Lerman — design
- Alexandra Berg — artwork
