= Squier Jagmaster =

Electric guitar

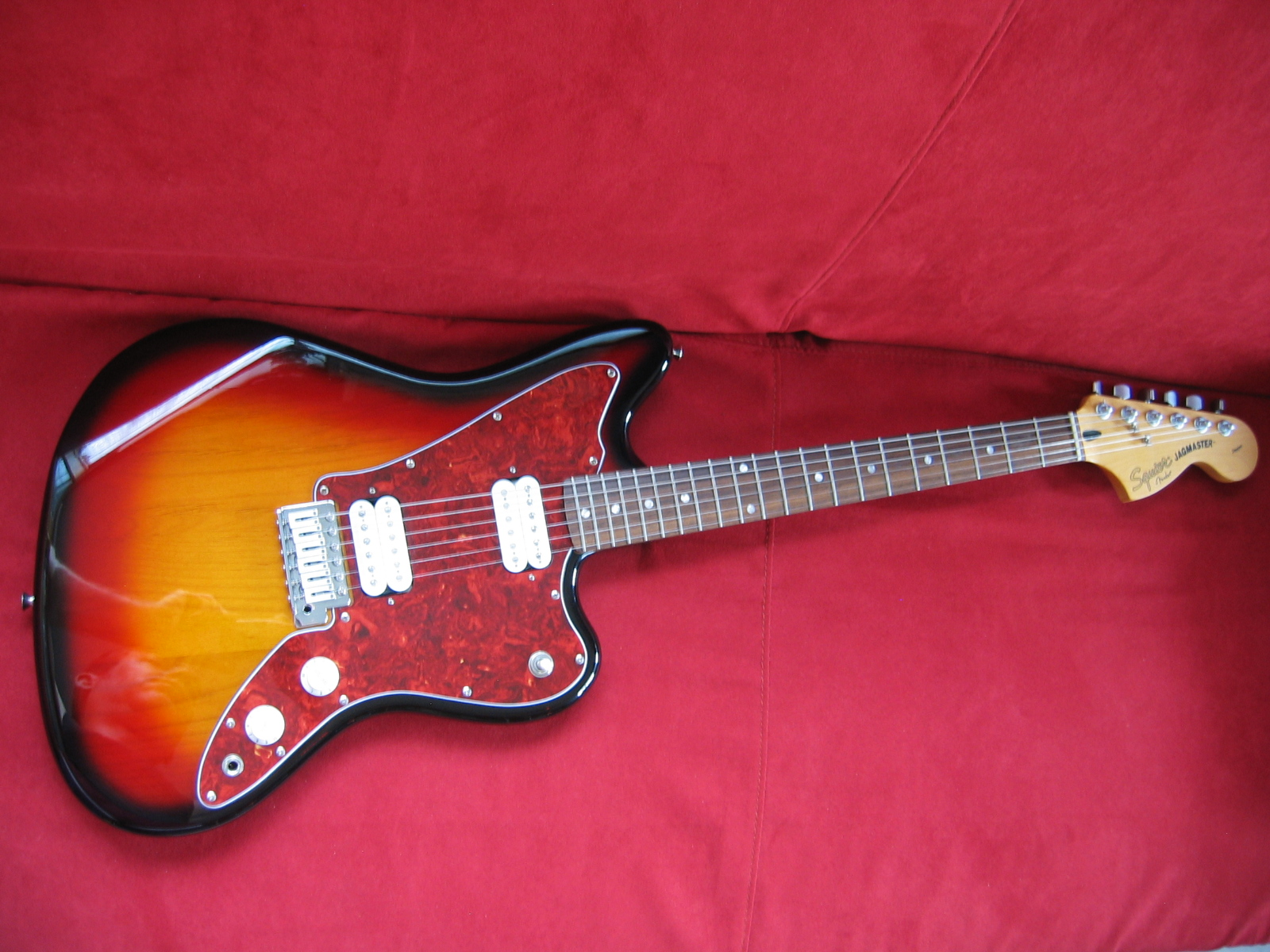
- Squier Jagmaster
- Manufacturer: Squier
- Period: 1996 — 1998, 2000 — 2005, 2005 — 2012

Construction
- Body type: Solid
- Neck joint: Bolt-on neck
- Scale: 25.5 or 24 in (648 or 610 mm)

Woods
- Body: Basswood (1996-1998) or Alder (2000-2005)
- Neck: Maple
- Fretboard: Rosewood

Hardware
- Bridge: Stratocaster-Style Tremolo
- Pickup(s): 2 humbuckers

Colors available
- Vista Series - Black, Sonic Blue, 3-color Sunburst, Olympic White, and Candy Apple Red 2000 Reissue (Standard Series) - Montego Black, Silver Sparkle, and Candy Apple Red; 2005 Reissue (Jagmaster II) - Black, 3-color Sunburst 2011 Reissue (Vintage) - Black, 3-color Sunburst

The Squier Jagmaster is an electric guitar marketed by the Fender Musical Instruments Corporation under its Squier budget brand. It is based on the design of the classic Fender Jazzmaster and Fender Jaguar, but with several significant differences reflecting the tastes of modern guitarists, including much simplified electronics, humbucking pickups, a standard Stratocaster-style tremolo bridge, and, on Vista Series versions, a short-scale, 24-inch neck (22 frets).

== History ==
The first Jagmasters appeared in 1996, were marketed under the Vista Series, and made in Japan. The Jagmaster in its original form was made for a period of only two years: 1996 through 1998. The first Japanese Jagmasters had a neck in which the truss rod is adjusted at the bottom of the neck, while the later Japanese models have a 1970s-style 'bullet' truss rod, which is adjusted at the headstock. The original Japanese Jagmasters featured a maple neck, rosewood fretboard, and basswood body. The list price was $699.99. However, when the Japanese market crashed, Fender closed the Japanese production plants in which the Jagmaster was produced.

The Jagmaster was reintroduced in 2000, this time made in China. It featured Duncan-designed pickups and a 25.5-inch scale length with 21 frets. In 2005, the 2000 Jagmaster was discontinued and replaced with the (also Chinese-made) Squier Jagmaster II, which features different visual aesthetics as well as the original 24-inch scale length neck (22 frets). In 2007 this had become a 21-fret 24-inch scale length neck. The 2005 Jagmaster II has only two color options: black and sunburst. The third finish option, "Silver Sparkle" of the 2000 reissues, is no longer available.

In 2012, the Jagmaster model was discontinued. It was replaced by a dual-humbucker Jaguar model, which featured all of the same simplifications as the Jagmaster; it was part of Squier's Vintage Modified series. The short-scale Jaguar model was later joined by a 25.5"-scale length Squier Affinity Series Jazzmaster model with dual humbuckers and a hardtail bridge and, in 2018, the Fender Player Series Jaguar, which combined most of the features of the Jagmaster with a traditional Jaguar vibrato bridge.

== See also ==
- Jagstang
