= Solo saxophone =

The genre of solo saxophone has a rich, but largely unmapped history in contemporary music, particularly jazz. Many, but not all, musicians who play and record solo saxophone use extended techniques, a vocabulary of the saxophone beyond its normal range. Notable musicians in this field include Kaoru Abe, Anthony Braxton, Peter Brötzmann, John Butcher, Don Dietrich, Eric Dolphy, Brandon Evans, Paul Flaherty, Mats Gustafsson, Coleman Hawkins, Lee Konitz, Steve Lacy, Joe Mcphee, Roscoe Mitchell, Evan Parker, Sonny Rollins, Sam Newsome, Ned Rothenberg, Masayoshi Urabe, Ken Vandermark, Colin Stetson, Jonah Parzen-Johnson and Andre Vida, Gianni Gebbia.

== Selected discography ==
- Anthony Braxton, For Alto, 1969 (Delmark)
- Roscoe Mitchell, Solo Saxophone Concerts, 1973 (Sackville)
- Lee Konitz, Lone-Lee, 1974 (SteepleChase)
- Evan Parker, Saxophone Solos, 1975 (Incus 19. Re-released on Chronoscope CPE2002-2 and on psi 09.01)
- John Butcher, 13 Friendly Numbers, 1991 (Originally released on ACTA. 2004 reissue on Unsounds)
- Mats Gustafsson, The Education Of Lars Jerry, 1999 (Xeric)
- Gianni Gebbia, H-Portraits, 1999 (Rastascan) " Body Limits " 1995 Splasch records, " Arcana Maior "2000 ( Rastascan records)
- Andre Vida, I don't know whats wrong with me, my computer eyes or my internet knees, 2007 (Insubordinations)
- Sam Newsome, Blue Soliloquy: Solo Works for Soprano Saxophone, 2009 (CD Baby)
- Colin Stetson, New History Warfare Volume II: Judges, 2011 (Constellation)
- Jonah Parzen-Johnson, Michiana, 2012 (Primary Records)
- Brandon Evans, Solo Saxophone X901, 2018 (Human Plastic)
- Maury Coles, Solo saxophone record, 1977 (Onari).
