= Cunningham Bird =

Studio album by Madison Cunningham and Andrew Bird
- Released: October 18, 2024
- Genres: Folk rock; indie
- Length: 32:47
- Labels: Verve Forecast; Wegawam
- Producer: Mike Viola

Madison Cunningham chronology
Revealer (2022)	Cunningham Bird (2024)	Ace (2025)

Andrew Bird chronology
Sunday Morning Put-On (2024)	Cunningham Bird (2024)

Singles from Cunningham Bird
- 1. "Crying in the Night" / "Crystal" Released: September 17, 2024; 2. "Without a Leg to Stand On" Released: September 30, 2024; 3. "Don't Let Me Down Again" Released: October 15, 2024

Cunningham Bird is a studio album by the American singer-songwriters Madison Cunningham and Andrew Bird. It is a track-by-track cover of the album Buckingham Nicks (1973) by Lindsey Buckingham and Stevie Nicks. The tribute album was produced by Mike Viola and was released through Verve Forecast and Wegawam Music on October 18, 2024. Prior to the release of the album, the duo's renditions of "Crying in the Night", "Crystal", "Without a Leg to Stand On", and "Don't Let Me Down Again" were released as singles.

== Background ==
The original Buckingham Nicks album was released in 1973, shortly before both Buckingham and Nicks joined Fleetwood Mac. The album had a limited release on 12-inch vinyl but it was not commercially available for fifty years afterward. Cunningham Bird contains covers of all ten of the album's tracks in their original order, with some tracks containing altered harmonies and arrangements.

In 2024, before the original album was reissued, violinist/whistler/singer Andrew Bird and singer-songwriter/guitarist Madison Cunningham determined to make a tribute album. The idea came from Bird who first approached Cunningham to collaborate on the arrangements. They were joined by producer Mike Viola who contributed arrangements and played bass and electric piano. They adapted the songs to suit their style, refraining from a rote reproduction of the 1973 songs. Cunningham said she enjoyed reworking the "fascinating" and emotional songs into "something we would want to sing and play together." Bird said he felt that the original was "inaccessible to a lot of people" because it had not been re-issued, which was part of the impetus to create the tribute album. The other part was that the "dysfunction" in the music was very intriguing, with so much "drama brewing in the songs", according to Bird. The folk rock drummer Griffin Goldsmith from Dawes supplied percussion on three songs.

== Track listing ==
No.	Title	Writer(s)	Length
1.	"Crying in the Night"	Stevie Nicks	2:35
2.	"Stephanie"	Lindsey Buckingham	2:19
3.	"Without a Leg to Stand On"	Buckingham	4:12
4.	"Crystal"	Nicks	4:43
5.	"Long Distance Winner"	Nicks	3:34
6.	"Don't Let Me Down Again"	Buckingham	3:23
7.	"Django"	John Lewis	1:12
8.	"Races are Run"	Nicks	3:35
9.	"Lola (My Love)"	Buckingham	2:31
10.	"Frozen Love"	Buckingham; Nicks	4:43
Total length:			32:47

== Personnel ==
Musicians

- Madison Cunningham – vocals, acoustic guitar (1–6, 8–10)
- Andrew Bird – violin, vocals (1, 3–10)
- Mike Viola – Wurlitzer, bass, drums (1–6, 8, 10), percussion (1, 5, 6, 8), acoustic guitar (8)
- Griffin Goldsmith – drums (1, 5, 9), percussion (1, 5)

Technical

- Mike Viola – producer, engineer, mixing
- Jeff Lipton – mastering
- Costanza Tinti – assistant mastering engineer
- Andrea Troolin – executive producer
