= Jessica Dobson =

American singer and multi-instrumentalist

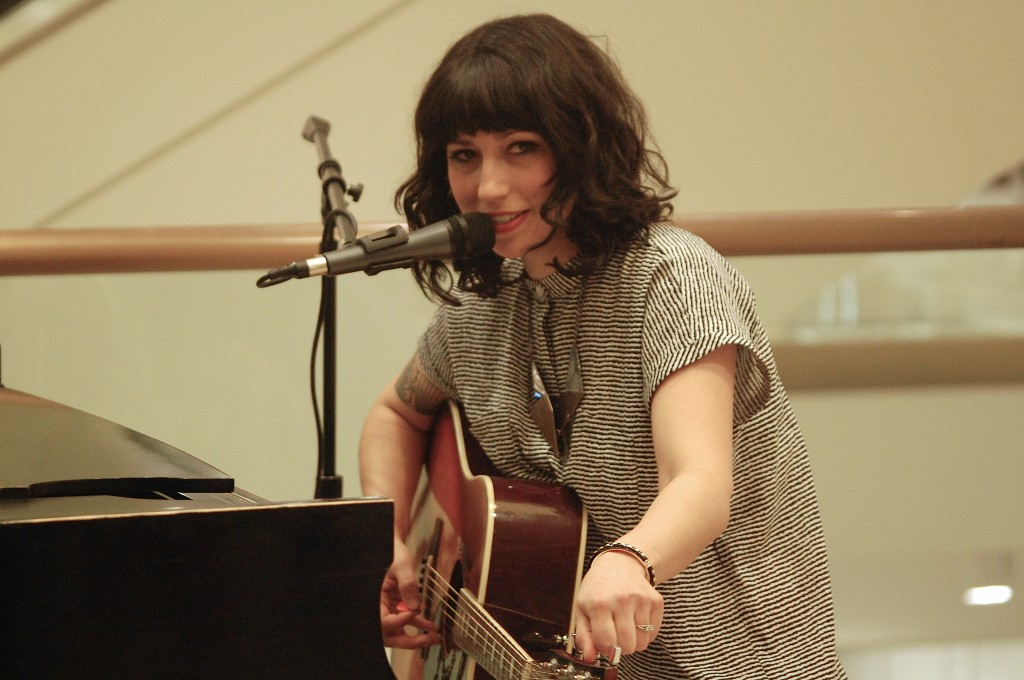
- Jessica Dobson at Nordstrom flagship store, Seattle

Background information
- Born: May 12, 1984 (age 42); Los Angeles, California, United States
- Genre: Indie rock
- Instruments: Vocals, guitar, bass, keyboards, drums

Jessica Dobson (born 1984) is an American singer, songwriter, and multi-instrumentalist. She has performed with several musicians and bands, including Beck, Conor Oberst, Spoon, Yeah Yeah Yeahs, and American indie rock band The Shins, as well as being a solo artist. She is currently fronting and playing guitar for her own band, Deep Sea Diver.

== Career ==
Born in Los Angeles, California, Dobson was signed to Atlantic Records when she was 19 years old. She recorded two solo albums under her own name while on the label, but she was not satisfied with either of the finished products and Atlantic ultimately shelved both albums.

=== Deep Sea Diver ===
After leaving Atlantic, Dobson recorded an EP called New Caves under the name Deep Sea Diver. She later formed a band under the Deep Sea Diver name consisting of herself on guitar, John Raines on bass and Peter Mansen on drums. The band's full-length debut album, History Speaks, was self-released in February 2012. In September 2019, she began touring with Joseph in support of Deep Sea Diver's forthcoming third full-length record.

=== The Shins ===
In August 2011, it was announced that Dobson would be performing with American indie rock band The Shins. She toured with the band throughout October, and she became an official member of the band in February 2012. Due to her desire to spend more time on writing and performing her own music, she departed from The Shins in 2013.

=== Beck ===
It was announced that Dobson would perform with indie/alternative musician Beck on his Modern Guilt tour from 2008 to 2009.

== Personal life ==
Dobson is married to Peter Mansen, who is the drummer of Deep Sea Diver. They met when he was working as a barista at the Lighthouse Roasters coffee house in Seattle. Dobson is a Christian and includes spiritual themes in her music.

== Discography ==
=== With Deep Sea Diver ===
- New Caves EP (2009)
- History Speaks (2012)
- Always Waiting EP (2014)
- Secrets (2016)
- Impossible Weight (2020)
- Billboard Heart (2025)
