= Zongo Junction =

Brooklyn-based instrumental Afrobeat band

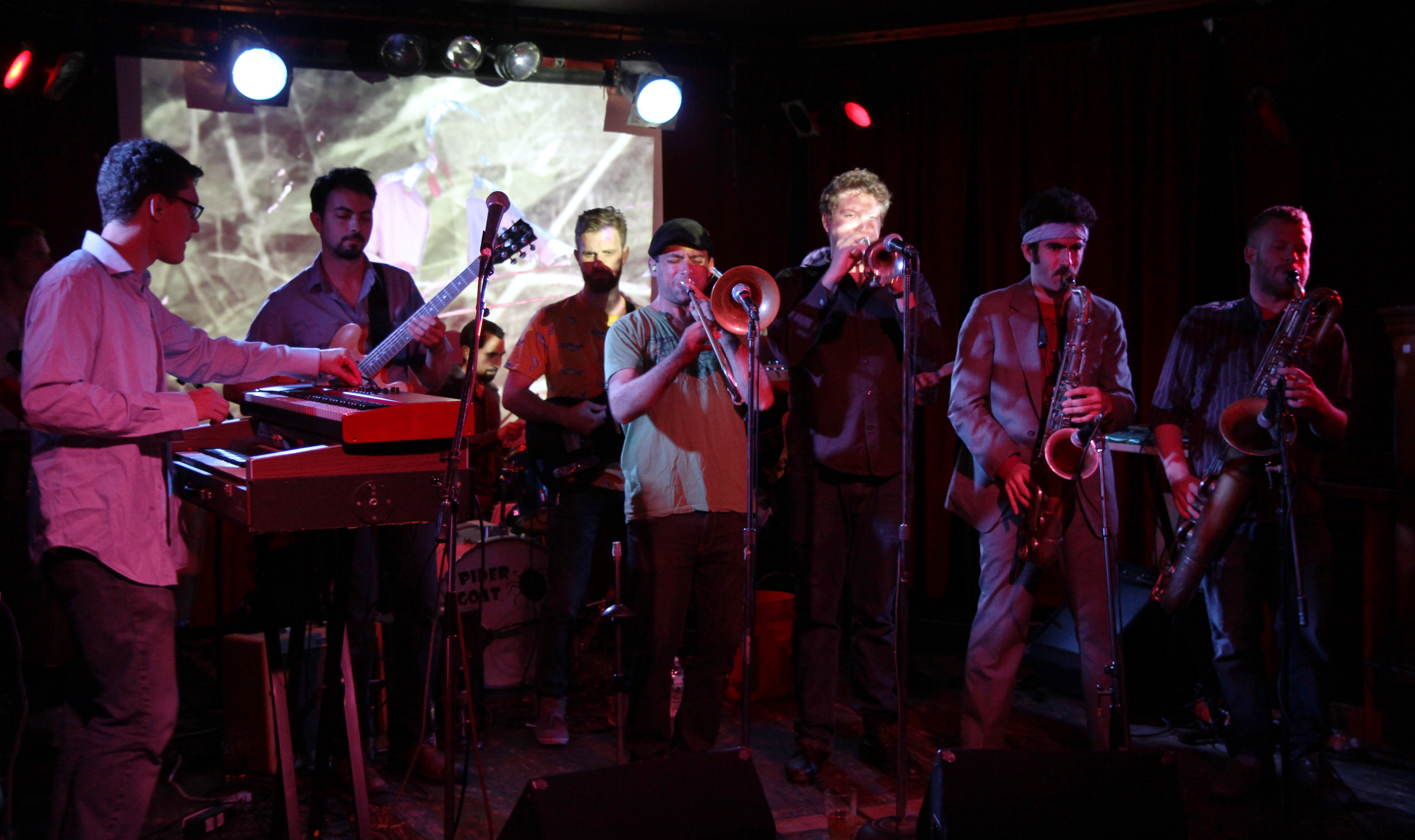
- Zongo Junction performing in 2012

Background information
- Origin: United States
- Genres: Afrobeat, Jazz, Funk
- Years active: 2009–2015
- Labels: Primary Records, Electric Cowbell
- Past members: Noah Garabedian, Raffi Garabedian, Joe Hartnett, Danny Lubin-Laden, Pavel Kogan-Liakhov, Aaron Shafer-Haiss, Adam Coopersmith, Charlie Ferguson, Morgan Greenstreet, Jordan Hyde, David Lizmi, Ross Edwards, Adam Schatz, Jonah Parzen-Johnson, Kevin Moehringer, Aaron Rockers

Zongo Junction was a nine-piece instrumental Afrobeat band based in Brooklyn, New York. The band was formed in 2010. The members of Zongo Junction stretch the Afrobeat style to fit their musical interests, combining elements of Sun Ra, Talking Heads, and Fela Kuti to create their own version of afrobeat. Zongo Junction released their five-song debut EP Thieves! in 2010.

The band may have adopted the name Zongo Junction from a bus stop of the same name in Madina, a suburb of Ghana's capital, Accra.

== The band ==
- Charlie Ferguson - Drums
- Morgan Greenstreet - Percussion
- Jordan Hyde - Guitar
- David Lizmi - Bass
- Ross Edwards - Keyboards
- Adam Schatz - Tenor saxophone
- Matt Nelson - Tenor saxophone
- Jonah Parzen-Johnson - Baritone saxophone
- Kevin Moehringer - Trombone
- Aaron Rockers - Trumpet

== Discography ==
- Big Sir - Single (2015)
- No Discount (Electric Cowbell Records, 2014)
- The Van That Got Away - Single (Primary Records, 2012)
- Thieves! (2010)
