= We Jazz Records =

- Founded: 2016
- Founder: Matti Nives
- Genre: jazz
- Country of origin: Finland
- Official website: wejazzrecords.bandcamp.com

We Jazz Records is a Finnish jazz record label, based in Helsinki.

== History ==
The We Jazz name was first used when Matti Nives hosted a club night with saxophonist Timo Lassy in 2009. Later in 2013, Nives started an annual We Jazz Festival in Helsinki, before he launched We Jazz Records in 2016. The first release was a self-titled album by Bowman Trio, released in September 2016. It had been recorded at the We Jazz Festival in December 2015.

The label has been noted for releasing different styles of jazz, including those that explore electronica and experimental music. Many of their releases come from within the Helsinki jazz scene.

The We Jazz Festival has continued to be held each year in late-November / early-December, except for in 2020 due to the COVID-19 pandemic in Finland. Instead, they founded the Odysseus Festival, held in 2021 on the small island of Lonna.

A quarterly magazine, We Jazz Magazine, was launched as an experiment. For the first issue, 1,000 copies were printed which sold out within two weeks. The second issue, released in 2021, increased the number of copies to 2,000.

A We Jazz store was opened in 2019 after Nives was offered a large vinyl collection owned by late Swiss music journalist Francis Montfort.
