= Revealer (album) =

Studio album by Madison Cunningham
- Released: September 9, 2022
- Studios: Flora (Portland); Sunset Sound 3 (North Hollywood); Papercheser (North Hollywood); Phantom (Gallatin); Sonic Ranch (Tornillo)
- Genre: Folk rock
- Length: 43:06
- Label: Verve Forecast
- Producers: Tyler Chester; Mike Elizondo; Tucker Martine

Madison Cunningham chronology
Wednesday (2020)	Revealer (2022)	Cunningham Bird (2024)

Singles from Revealer
- 1. "Anywhere" Released: April 19, 2022; 2. "Hospital" Released: June 8, 2022; 3. "In from Japan" Released: July 20, 2022; 4. "Life According to Raechel" Released: August 17, 2022

Revealer is the second (Note: Revealer is officially considered to be Cunningham's second studio album. However, it is her third if her since-deleted 2014 album Authenticity is included.) studio album by American musician Madison Cunningham. It was released on September 9, 2022 through Verve Forecast Records and was primarily produced by Tyler Chester and Mike Elizondo. (Note: "In from Japan" was produced by Tucker Martine.) Revealer mixes elements of folk rock, jazz, and pop while Cunningham has also cited Afropop and South American music as influences.

Upon its release, Revealer received positive reviews from critics, with particular praise being directed at Cunningham's songwriting, vocals, and guitar playing. The album reached the top 30 on the UK Official Record Store chart, giving Cunningham her first top 40 placement, and won the award for Best Folk Album at the 2023 Grammy Awards. Cunningham has toured in promotion of the album throughout 2023 and 2024, including as an opening act for Hozier and John Mayer.

== Music and lyrics ==
On the album's title, Cunningham described the word "revealer" as "neither positive nor negative; it means unveiling truth." She also stated that much of the record "deals with depression and anxiety", alongside the desire for emotional stability. The process of writing "Hospital" came quickly for Cunningham, with her stating: "everything happened all at once, including the lyrics. Usually I torture myself over the lyrics."

"Life According to Raechel" was written about Cunningham's late grandmother.

"In from Japan" is the album's only song to be produced by Tucker Martine. The song was written over a period of months, with the pre-chorus being written much later than the first verse and chorus. Its lyrics were written during what Cunningham has described as "the peak of the hardship" of the record-making process. On the lyric "no one's holding you back now", Cunningham said: "One way to view it is in a positive manner. You’re like, 'oh, yeah, that's true — no one can really tell me what to do. I am my own person, I can make my own choices... and then there's the other side of that coin, where anyone who deals with anxiety can probably relate to viewing a statement like that is like, 'Oh, no, I'm gonna mess it up. When's the mistake going to happen?"

== Release and reception ==
Professional ratings
Review scores
Source	Rating
AllMusic	3.5/5 stars
The Line of Best Fit	8/10

Upon its release, Revealer made the top 30 on the Official Record Store Chart in the UK, peaking at number 24, her first chart placement in that country. The album later won the award for Best Folk Album at the 2023 Grammy Awards, while "Life According to Raechel" also received a nomination for Best American Roots Performance.

In a review for AllMusic, critic Marcy Donelson gave the album 3.5 out of 5 stars, and wrote "diverging in subtle ways from her debut, Revealer's somewhat more adventurous arrangements and spirited lyrics hold a charm of their own." Additionally, Donelson noted the album as being "full of intricate musicianship alongside forthright observations." She considered the lyrical content of the album to revolve around "calling out bad behavior, whether it be from friends, destinations, or fate", while also making note of "more tender moments", such as "Life According to Raechel". Writing for The Line of Best Fit, Adam Wright gave the album a rating of 8 out of 10 and stated that while he felt it was "a little too musically similar to its predecessor", the album showed growth mainly in its songwriting and composition and that its "sonic complexities do mark a noticeable step forward."

== Track listing ==
All tracks are written by Madison Cunningham, except where noted.

Revealer
No.	Title	Writer(s)	Producer(s)	Length
1.	"All I've Ever Known"		Tyler Chester	5:06
2.	"Hospital"		Chester	3:33
3.	"Anywhere"	Cunningham; Tyler Chester	Mike Elizondo	3:48
4.	"Sunshine over the Counter"		Chester	4:22
5.	"Life According to Raechel"		Chester	4:33
6.	"Who Are You Now"		Elizondo	3:17
7.	"In from Japan"	Cunningham; Dan Wilson	Tucker Martine	4:22
8.	"Collider Particles"	Cunningham; Elizondo; Mikky Ekko	Elizondo	3:10
9.	"Your Hate Could Power a Train"	Cunningham; Elizondo	Elizondo	3:11
10.	"Our Rebellion"		Elizondo	3:08
11.	"Sara and the Silent Crowd"		Elizondo	4:30
Total length:				43:06

Bonus tracks (deluxe edition)
No.	Title	Producer(s)	Length
12.	"Hospital (One Man Down)" (feat. Remi Wolf)	Ethan Gruska	3:27
13.	"Inventing the Wheel"	Martine	4:17
14.	"Death by Suspicion"	Cunningham; Elizondo	4:43
15.	"Who Are You Now" (version 1)	Chester	3:16
16.	"Hospital" (first demo)	Cunningham	4:00
17.	"Life According to Raechel" (first demo)	Cunningham	4:13
Total length:			67:02

== Personnel ==
"All I've Ever Known"

- Madison Cunningham – vocals, guitars, bass, drums, percussion, cello, Mellotron, piano, drum machine, additional sounds

"Hospital"

- Madison Cunningham – vocals, guitars, Mellotron, Wurlitzer electric piano, additional drums, additional bass
- Matt Chamberlain – drums
- Tyler Chester – bass

"Anywhere"

- Madison Cunningham – vocals, acoustic guitar, electric guitar, mandocello, synthesizer, piano, additional percussion, additional sounds
- Matt Chamberlain – drums, congas, percussion
- Mike Elizondo – electric bass, upright bass, synthesizer bass, synthesizers
- Tyler Chester – MPC loop

"Sunshine Over the Counter"

- Madison Cunningham – vocals, guitars, Mellotron, piano, additional percussion, woodwind arrangement
- Matt Chamberlain – drums, percussion
- Tyler Chester – bass, MPC loop
- Jesse Chandler – flute, alto flute, clarinet, bass clarinet, alto saxophone

"Life According to Raechel"

- Madison Cunningham – vocals, guitar, bass
- Tyler Chester – bass drum, percussion
- David Campbell – cello
- Kate Gungor – violin
- Tim Allen – violin
- Lavinia Pavlish – violin
- John Arndt – string arrangement

"Who Are You Now"

- Madison Cunningham – vocals, acoustic guitar, electric guitar, Wurlitzer electric piano
- Mike Elizondo – drum programming, electric bass, synthesizers
- Aaron Sterling – drums, percussion
- Rob Burger – synthesizers
- Paul Cartwright – strings, string arrangement

"In from Japan"

- Madison Cunningham – vocals, bass, piano, keyboards, guitars, percussion, slide guitar, autoharp, additional percussion
- McKenzie Smith – drums, percussion
- Philip Krohnengold – cello, Mellotron, additional sounds
- Anna Fritz – cello
- Mirabai Peart – violin, viola
- Ryan Francesconi – string arrangement

"Collider Particles"

- Madison Cunningham – vocals, acoustic guitar, rubber bridge guitar, drums, guitar synthesizer, Wurlitzer electric piano
- Mike Elizondo – electric bass, electric guitar, drum programming

"Your Hate Could Power a Train"

- Madison Cunningham – vocals, ukulele, acoustic guitar, electric guitar, synthesizers
- Mike Elizondo – upright bass, synthesizers
- Aaron Sterling – drums, percussion
- Rob Burger – piano, synthesizers

"Our Rebellion"

- Madison Cunningham – vocals, electric guitar, lap steel guitar, percussion, synthesizer
- Mike Elizondo – electric bass, percussion, synthesizer
- Rob Burger – piano, pump organ, synthesizers, Wurlitzer electric piano
- Aaron Sterling – drums, percussion

"Sara and the Silent Crowd"

- Madison Cunningham – vocals, acoustic guitar, electric guitar, piano, guitar synthesizer
- Mike Elizondo – drum programming, electric bass, synthesizer bass, synthesizers
- Aaron Sterling – drums, percussion
- Rob Burger – piano, Hammond B3 organ, Vox Continental organ, pump organ, synthesizers
