= Madison Cunningham =

American singer-songwriter (born 1996)

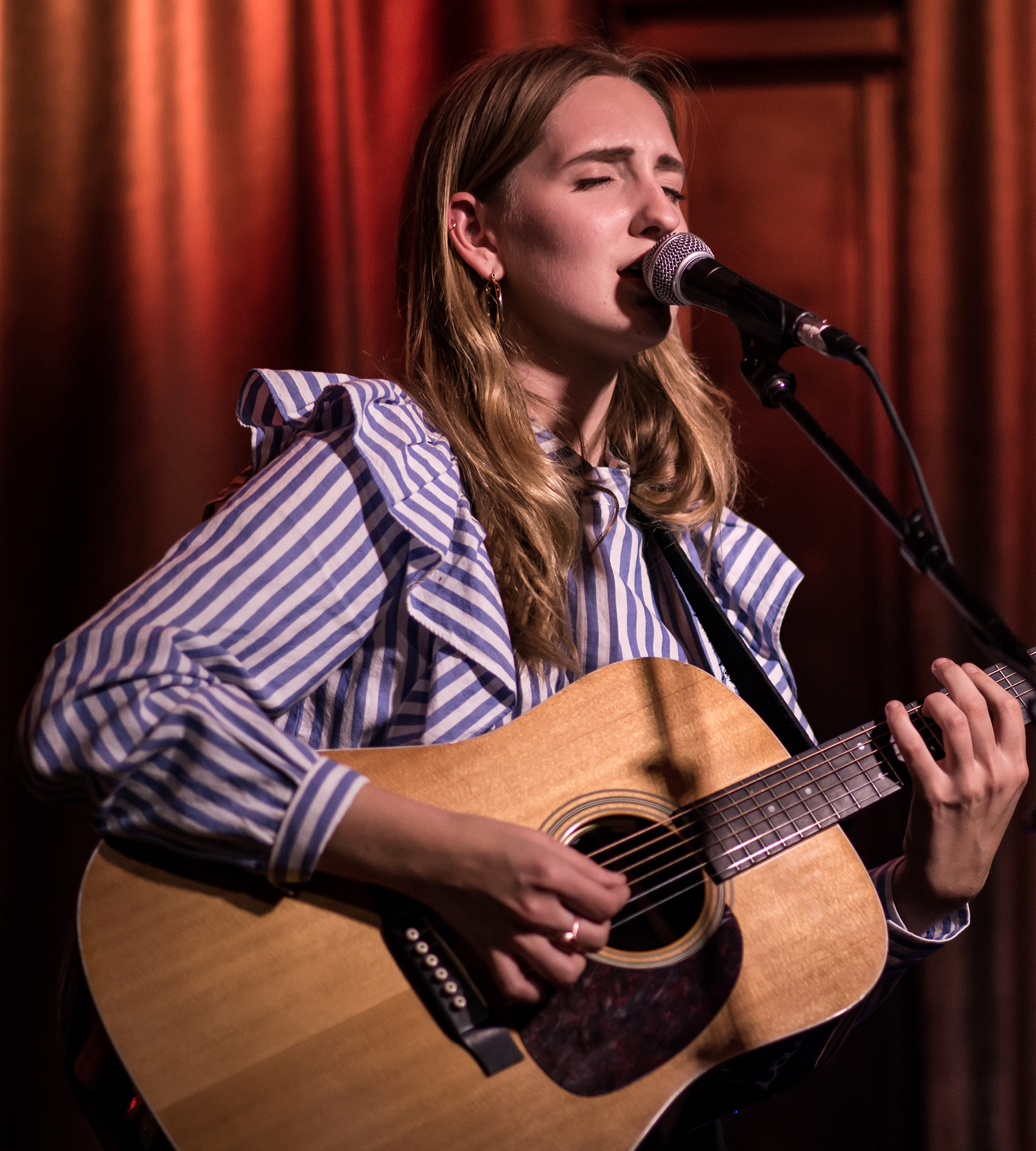
- Cunningham performing in 2017

Background information
- Born: October 14, 1996 (age 30); Escondido, California, U.S.
- Origin: Costa Mesa, California, U.S.
- Genres: Americana; folk-rock; alternative rock; jazz
- Occupations: Singer; songwriter; guitarist
- Instruments: Vocals; guitar; piano
- Years active: 2014–present
- Label: Verve Forecast
- Website: madisoncunningham.com

Madison Cunningham (born October 14, 1996) is an American singer, songwriter and guitarist. Rolling Stone described her music as "a new spin on West Coast folk-rock, with classical tendencies, electric guitars, jazz-school chord changes and alt-rock strut all living under the same roof". Her second studio album, Who Are You Now (2019), was nominated for the best Americana album in the 62nd Annual Grammy Awards. Her third studio album Revealer (2022) won the Grammy for Best Folk Album in 2023.

== Life and career ==
Madison Cunningham was born in Escondido, California, and later moved to Costa Mesa, where she grew up. She is the daughter of a pastor at a local church, and she has four sisters. Influenced by her father and grandmother, Cunningham started playing guitar when she was seven years old, performing in the church. As a teenager, she met producer Tyler Chester, with whom she made the self-released studio album Authenticity (2014).

She removed Authenticity from streaming services in 2021 because she felt it was no longer relatable. Cunningham has said of her faith that "Christianity looks different to me all the time. The phrase that I use with my husband is 'I’m becoming more and more of an agnostic every day.'"

After graduating from high school, Cunningham discovered many influences, such as the Beatles, Joni Mitchell and Bob Dylan. Other inspirations include Radiohead, Fiona Apple, Juana Molina and Jeff Buckley.

In 2017, Cunningham joined the cast of American Public Media's show Live from Here, presented by Chris Thile, of whom she became a frequent collaborator. She also toured with multi-instrumentalist Andrew Bird, being credited for vocals in his twelfth solo studio album, My Finest Work Yet (2019).

Who Are You Now, released on August 16, 2019, earned her a Grammy nomination in the following year for best Americana album. In 2020, Cunningham released her third extended play (EP), Wednesday, covering songs by Tom Waits, Radiohead, John Mayer and the Beatles. She is currently based in Los Angeles.

On August 3, 2022, the artist made an appearance at NPR's Tiny Desk, playing four songs from her upcoming studio album Revealer. NPR music contributor Jewly Hight states that Madison was an "audacious guide, steering us toward exploration with the shrewd parts she played on three different guitars over the course of four songs".

On September 9, 2022, Cunningham released Revealer, her third studio album. Consequence's editorial coordinator Paolo Ragusa writes about it: "With each song on Revealer, Cunningham is proving that she can satisfy and surprise her audience all at once, and it’s one of the most delightful albums released so far in 2022."

On October 18, 2024, Cunningham and Andrew Bird released a new studio album, titled Cunningham Bird, which features covers of the entirety of Buckingham Nicks (1973), the only studio album by the duo of American rock guitarist Lindsey Buckingham and singer Stevie Nicks, both of whom later joined Fleetwood Mac.

On August 15, 2025, Cunningham released the single "My Full Name", alongside the announcement of her fourth studio album, Ace, which was released on October 10, 2025.

== Discography ==
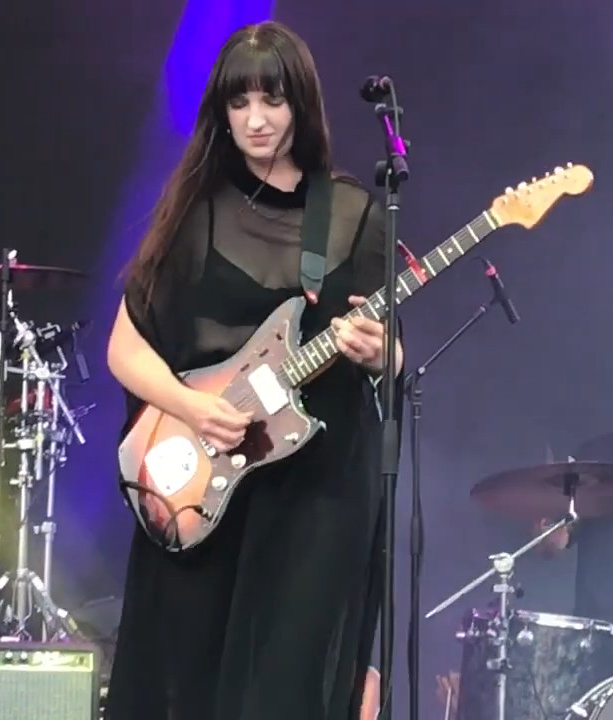
Cunningham performing at the Winnetka Music Festival, 2023

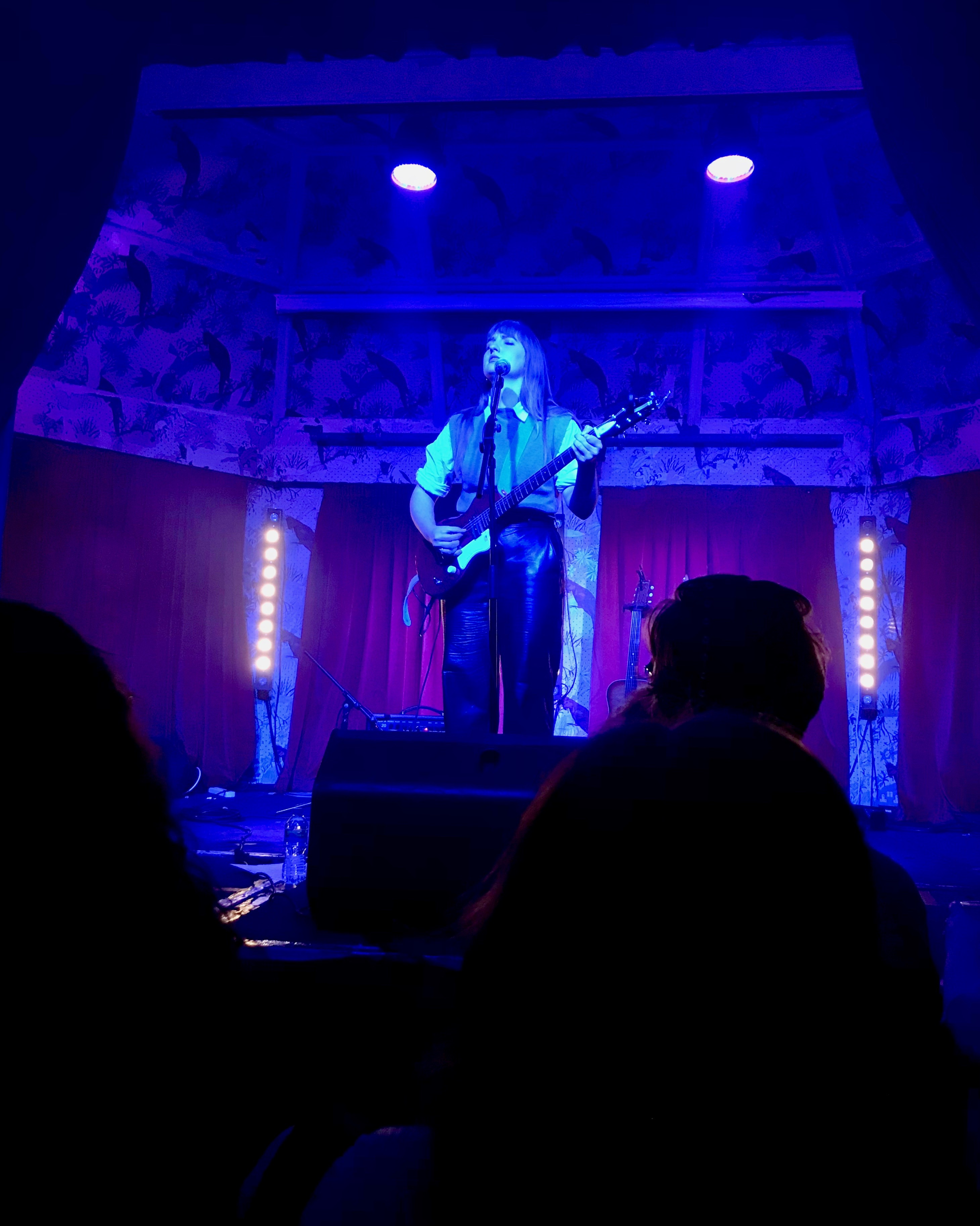
Cunningham performing at the Deaf Institute in Manchester, England, 2022

=== Studio albums ===
- Authenticity (2014) (Note: Since deleted from Cunningham's discography)
- Who Are You Now (2019)
- Revealer (2022)
- Ace (2025)

=== Collaborative albums ===
- Cunningham Bird (2024) with Andrew Bird

=== Extended plays ===
- Love, Lose, Remember (2018)
- For the Sake of the Rhyme (2019)
- Wednesday (2020)

=== Singles ===
Title	Year	Peak chart positions	Album
Title	Year	Adult Alternative Airplay	Album
"Beauty into Clichés"	2018	—	For the Sake of the Rhyme
"All at Once"	2018	—	For the Sake of the Rhyme
"Last Boat to Freedom"	2018	—	For the Sake of the Rhyme
"Location"	2018	—	For the Sake of the Rhyme
"Pin It Down"	2019	—	Who Are You Now
"Something to Believe In"	2019	—	Who Are You Now
"Trouble Found Me"	2019	—	Who Are You Now
"No One Else to Blame"	2020	—	Non-album singles
"Giraffe"	2020	—	Non-album singles
"Coming Back"	2020	—	Non-album singles
"In My Life"	2020	—	Wednesday
"No Surprises"	2020	—	Wednesday
"The Age of Worry"	2020	—	Wednesday
"Broken Harvest"	2021	—	Non-album single
"Poses"	2021	—	Wednesday (Extended Edition)
"Anywhere"	2022	—	Revealer
"Hospital"	2022	—	Revealer
"In From Japan"	2022	—	Revealer
"Life According to Raechel"	2022	—	Revealer
"Hospital (One Man Down)" (featuring Remi Wolf)	2023	—	Revealer (Deluxe Edition)
"Inventing the Wheel"	2023	—	Revealer (Deluxe Edition)
"Subtitles"	2023	—	Non-album single
"Crying in the Night" / "Crystal" (with Andrew Bird)	2024	—	Cunningham Bird
"Without a Leg to Stand On" (with Andrew Bird)	2024	—	Cunningham Bird
"Don't Let Me Down Again" (with Andrew Bird)	2024	—	Cunningham Bird
"My Full Name"	2025	—	Ace
"Wake" (featuring Fleet Foxes)	2025	—	Ace
"Break the Jaw"	2025	25	Ace
"Show Me Where the Ending Starts"	2026	—	Sunrise on the Reaping – The Album

== Awards and nominations ==
Year	Organization	Award	Work	Result
2020	Grammy Awards	Best Americana Album	Who Are You Now	Nominated
2022	Grammy Awards	Best Folk Album	Wednesday (Extended Version)	Nominated
2023	Grammy Awards	Best Folk Album	Revealer	Won
2023	Grammy Awards	Best American Roots Performance	"Life According to Raechel"	Nominated
2024	Grammy Awards	Best American Roots Performance	"Inventing The Wheel"	Nominated
2027	Grammy Awards	Best American Roots Performance	"My Full Name"	Pending
2027	Grammy Awards	Best Contemporary Folk Album	Ace	Pending
