= The Way Home (2010 film) =

- Film poster
- Written by: Lance W. Dreesen
- Directed by: Lance W. Dreesen
- Starring: Pierce Gagnon; Dean Cain
- Music by: Deane Ogden
- Country of origin: United States
- Original language: English

Production
- Producers: Lance W. Dreesen; Shay Griffin; Clint Hutchison; Day Permuy; Randy Simpkins
- Cinematography: Ken Blakey
- Editors: Lance W. Dreesen; Ron Milestone

Original release
- Release: October 1, 2010

The Way Home is a 2010 American television film directed and written by Lance W. Dreesen and starring Dean Cain and Pierce Gagnon.

== Cast ==
- Pierce Gagnon as Little Joe
- Dean Cain as Randy Simpkins
- Sonny Shroyer as Ed Walker
