= Scoob! =

2020 film by Tony Cervone

- Theatrical release poster
- Directed by: Tony Cervone
- Screenplay by: Adam Sztykiel; Jack Donaldson; Derek Elliott; Matt Lieberman
- Story by: Matt Lieberman; Eyal Podell; Jonathon E. Stewart
- Based on: Characters by Hanna-Barbera Productions
- Produced by: Pam Coats; Allison Abbate
- Starring: Will Forte; Mark Wahlberg; Jason Isaacs; Gina Rodriguez; Zac Efron; Amanda Seyfried; Kiersey Clemons; Ken Jeong; Tracy Morgan; Frank Welker
- Edited by: Ryan Folsey; Vanara Taing
- Music by: Tom Holkenborg
- Production companies: Warner Animation Group Reel FX Animation
- Distributed by: Warner Bros. Pictures
- Release date: May 15, 2020 (United States)
- Running time: 94 minutes
- Country: United States
- Language: English
- Budget: $90 million
- Box office: $28.5 million

Scoob! is a 2020 American animated adventure mystery comedy film that is a reboot of the theatrical Scooby-Doo film series and the third theatrical film based on the characters, following Scooby-Doo (2002) and Scooby-Doo 2: Monsters Unleashed (2004). The film was directed by Tony Cervone and written by Adam Sztykiel, Jack Donaldson, Derek Elliott, and Matt Lieberman. It stars Will Forte, Mark Wahlberg, Jason Isaacs, Gina Rodriguez, Zac Efron, Amanda Seyfried, Kiersey Clemons, Ken Jeong, Tracy Morgan, and Frank Welker, with the latter reprising his role as Scooby-Doo. Set in a Hanna-Barbera animated shared universe, the film follows Mystery Incorporated working with the Blue Falcon to solve their most challenging mystery behind their mascot's secret legacy and purpose, which connects with Dick Dastardly's evil plan to unleash Cerberus.

Plans for a new Scooby-Doo theatrical film began in June 2014, when Warner Bros. announced that they would reboot the Scooby-Doo film series with an animated film. Cervone was hired to direct the film in August 2015, with Dax Shepard being brought to co-direct it in September 2016, until he was no longer part of the project by October 2018. Warner Bros. then hired Chris Columbus, whose "affection for the character" made him an executive producer on the final film, while the studio “understands how much of its history is rooted in these iconic characters”.

Scoob! was originally set for a worldwide theatrical release on May 15, 2020. In response to the COVID-19 pandemic causing the closure of theaters across the globe, Warner Bros. made the film available to own digitally in the United States on the same date it was planned to be released in theaters. It received a theatrical release in select countries beginning in July 2020 and a secondary theatrical release in the United States beginning on May 21, 2021. It received mixed reviews from critics, who criticized its meme references. The film grossed $28.5 million against a budget of $90 million, but it topped digital rental charts in its first three weekends of release, becoming the third-most watched PVOD title in 2020.

A prequel, Scoob! Holiday Haunt, was originally set for release through HBO Max; it was cancelled in August 2022, although production on the film was completed after the cancellation.

== Plot ==
In Venice Beach, a young, lonely Shaggy Rogers befriends and adopts a young talking stray Great Dane, whom he names Scooby-Doo. On Halloween night, Scooby and Shaggy meet three young children—Fred Jones, Daphne Blake, and Velma Dinkley—before venturing into a haunted house, where they capture a thief disguised as a ghost, which inspires them to form Mystery Inc. and solve mysteries together.

Ten years later, Mystery Inc. goes into business. During an investor meeting with Simon Cowell, he refuses to do business with Scooby and Shaggy due to their behavior, which he insultingly proclaims as childish, and claims their friendship is useless. Infuriated and heartbroken, the pair storm out of the meeting and go to the Takamoto bowling alley to cool off, where they are terrorized by shapeshifting robots called Rottens that belong to Dick Dastardly, who seek to capture Scooby and Cerberus' three skulls. They are rescued by Dee Dee Skyes, and their lifelong heroes Dynomutt and Brian Crown, who has taken over from his father's role as the masked superhero, Blue Falcon. Dastardly and the Rottens trap and terrorize Scooby and Shaggy in a creepy abandoned amusement park, but the Falcon Force rescues them. Their investigation shows that Dastardly finds Scooby more important than Shaggy, causing Shaggy to feel alone.

Meanwhile, Fred, Daphne, and Velma discover that Dastardly is after Scooby and Shaggy, and head off to investigate. The group also reminisces about the good times they had with Shaggy and Scooby around, before being imprisoned in Dastardly's airship. They escape with one of the Rottens' help and make contact with Dee Dee to explain that she and the others are being taken to Messick Mountain, where the last skull is located. The group then finds out that Dastardly's plan is to open the gates to the Underworld to rescue his dog sidekick Muttley, who was trapped during an attempt to steal the Underworld's riches. Dastardly needs Scooby to unlock the gates since he is the last remaining descendant of Alexander the Great's dog, Peritas.

Scooby, Shaggy, and the Falcon Force go underground to a prehistoric island in Messick Mountain. Shaggy, who sees Scooby's importance as an insult to their friendship, wants Scooby to stay with him on the ship. Scooby wants Shaggy to join him and the group, but Shaggy angrily demands Scooby choose between him and the Falcon Force. Scooby picks the latter, to Shaggy's dismay, and finds Captain Caveman guarding the last skull and testing his bravery, in a fight for it. Dastardly tricks Shaggy into taking him to Scooby and the skull, and captures them, while the Rottens throw Fred, Daphne, and Velma out of the airship. Shaggy expresses guilt and remorse for Scooby's capture, and his speech inspires everyone to work together and rescue Scooby.

Arriving in Athens, Dastardly reveals the Underworld's gates with the three skulls and tries to unlock them with Scooby's paw while Scooby's friends pursue him in a flying Mystery Machine. The Rottens shoot them down, while Dastardly releases the rampaging Cerberus, causing the town to flee. Scooby runs to the crash site to reunite with his friends, and Dastardly reunites with Muttley in the Underworld, and they escape with some treasure. Scooby and Shaggy determine how to trap Cerberus; Fred, Daphne, and Velma determine how to close the gates; and the Falcon Force flies around Cerberus to keep him distracted. With help from the Rottens, they trap Cerberus back in the Underworld, but Shaggy sacrifices himself to stay inside the Underworld and lock the gates, following Alexander the Great and Peritas' bond prophecy. The gang finds an exit that continues the prophecy, which Scooby unlocks to reunite with Shaggy.

The Rottens capture Muttley and Dastardly, who is unmasked twice in a revelation that he impersonated Cowell. The Falcon Force takes the pair into custody, while Mystery Inc. returns home and unveils their official new headquarters. They celebrate their grand opening with the entire town, including the Falcon Force, who gifts them an upgraded Mystery Machine, before they head off to solve another mystery.

== Voice cast ==
- Will Forte as Norville "Shaggy" Rogers, Scooby-Doo's owner and best friend and the fun-loving member of Mystery Inc.
  - Iain Armitage as young Shaggy Rogers
- Mark Wahlberg as Brian Crown / Blue Falcon, the original Blue Falcon's son and successor. Crown is Wahlberg's first voice acting role, with the actor previously only performing live-action roles.
- Jason Isaacs as Dick Dastardly, a criminal mastermind plotting to obtain treasure from the Greek underworld and rescue his dog sidekick Muttley
- Gina Rodriguez as Velma Dinkley, the intellectual brain of Mystery Inc.
  - Ariana Greenblatt as young Velma Dinkley
- Zac Efron as Fred Jones, the leader of Mystery Inc.
  - Pierce Gagnon as young Fred Jones
- Amanda Seyfried as Daphne Blake, the fashionable member of Mystery Inc.
  - Mckenna Grace as young Daphne Blake
- Kiersey Clemons as Dee Dee Skyes, the pilot for the Falcon Force
- Ken Jeong as Dynomutt the Dog Wonder, the robot dog sidekick of Blue Falcon
- Tracy Morgan as Captain Caveman, a fur-covered caveman superhero who resides in Messick Mountain
- Frank Welker as Scooby-Doo, a talking Great Dane who was adopted by Shaggy as a child and the mascot of Mystery Inc.
  - Welker is the only current voice cast member from the franchise to reprise his role for the film, and also provides the vocal effects of the pterodactyl.
- Christina Hendricks as Officer Jaffe, a police officer. She is named after Nicole Jaffe, the original voice of Velma.
- Henry Winkler as Keith, the servant of the Falcon Fury
- John DiMaggio as a restaurant owner
- Kevin Heffernan as Officer Gary, a police officer who pursues a younger Scooby-Doo
- Ira Glass as himself
- Henry Kaufman as Chad and Chet, two kids who steal Shaggy's Halloween candy
- Maya Erskine as Judy Takamoto, the proprietor of Takamoto Bowling. She is named after Iwao Takamoto, the original designer of Scooby-Doo.
- Billy West as Muttley, the dog sidekick of Dick Dastardly
  - Don Messick provides Muttley's laughs, as well as the Spooky Space Kook, via archive recordings
- Fred Tatasciore as Cerberus, the giant three-headed ghost dog that guards the Greek underworld
- Justina Machado as Jamie Rivera, who calls Mystery Inc. to another mystery
- John McDaniel as Hal Murphy
- Pam Coats as Mrs Rogers, the mother of Shaggy
- Adam Sztykiel as Officer Casey, a police officer who investigates stolen items at the Rigby House. He is named after the late Casey Kasem, the original voice of Shaggy.
- Alex Kaufman as Officer North, a police officer who investigates stolen items at the Rigby House. She is named after the late Heather North, the second voice of Daphne.
- Vanara Taing as Dusty/Baby Rotten
- Sarah Lancia as Dispatcher Stevens, a police dispatcher. She is named after Pat Stevens, the second voice of Velma.
- Michael Kurinsky as Samuel Colton
- Kennedy Peil as Indira Knight
- Maven Morgan as Kari
- Eric Cowell as Ben

Cameos

- Simon Cowell as himself, Mystery Inc.'s first investor, who is later revealed to be Dastardly in disguise.
- Harry Perry as himself

Additionally, director Tony Cervone cameos as the voices of Ghost/Mr. Rigby as well as Alice.

Other characters from Hanna-Barbera shows that make non-vocal cameos include The Slag Brothers, Atom Ant, Jabberjaw, Grape Ape, Frankenstein Jr. and Dr. Benton Quest. All mentioned are included in the end credits.

== Production ==
=== Development ===
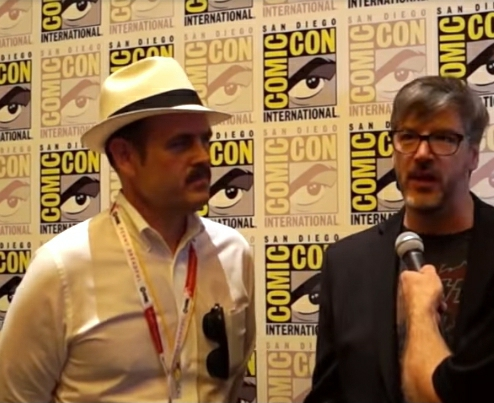
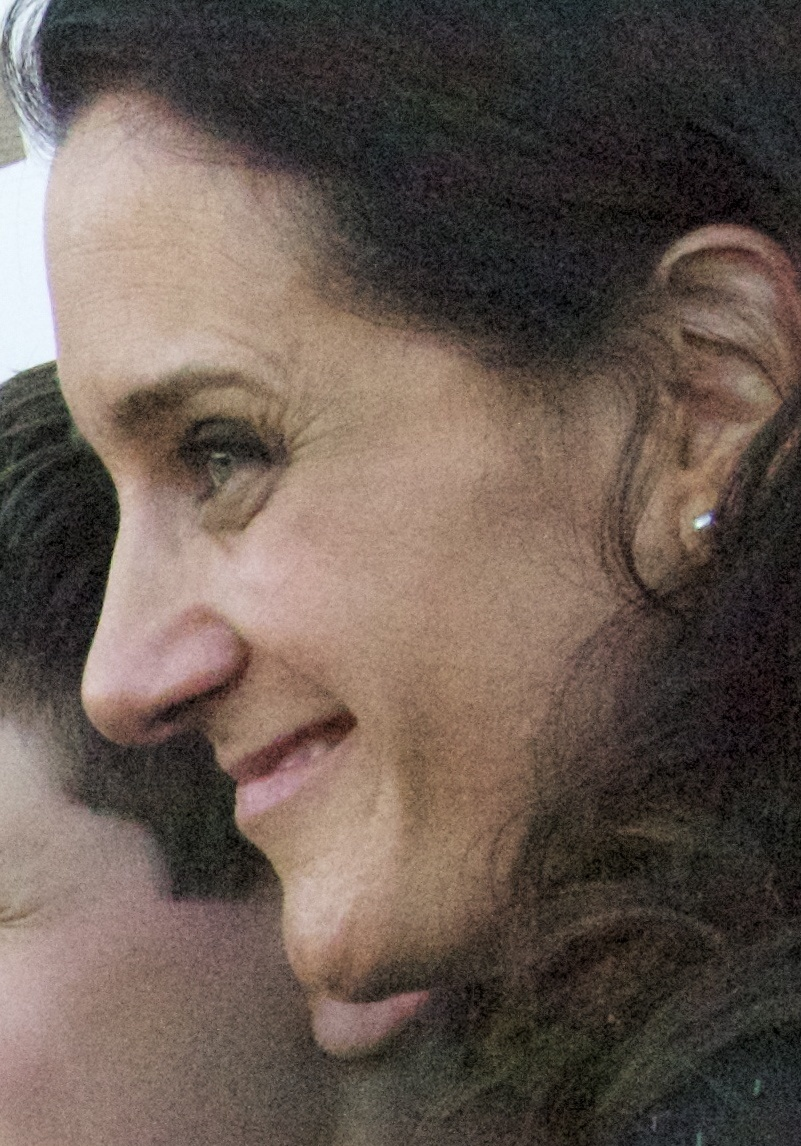
Director Tony Cervone (left) and Producer Allison Abbate (right).

On June 17, 2014, Warner Bros. Pictures announced that they would reboot the Scooby-Doo film series with an animated film, then being written by Randall Green. On August 17, 2015, Tony Cervone, who had previously worked on several Scooby-Doo projects, was hired to direct the animated film, now with a script by Matt Lieberman. Allison Abbate (Cervone's wife) and Pam Coats produced the film, with Charles Roven and Richard Suckle among its executive producers. Dan Povenmire, the co-creator of the Disney Channel series Phineas and Ferb and Milo Murphy's Law, was set to be involved in a creative capacity, and was eventually also credited as an executive producer on the film.

At the 2016 CinemaCon, the film's official title was announced to be S.C.O.O.B., with a plot involving Scooby-Doo and Shaggy rescued by a larger organization led by Blue Falcon. The film was intended to lead into a cinematic universe based on Hanna-Barbera properties. In September 2016, it was reported that Dax Shepard would co-direct and co-write the film along with Cervone and Lieberman respectively. In October 2018, it was announced that Shepard was no longer part of the project, thus leaving Cervone the solo director once again with Kelly Fremon Craig set to serve as screenwriter instead and Chris Columbus set to join as one of the film's executive producers as well. Ultimately, Lieberman, Adam Sztykiel, Jack Donaldson, and Derek Elliott received screenplay credit, with Lieberman, Eyal Podell, and Jonathon E. Stewart having "story by" billing.

Later in production, many miscellaneous Hanna-Barbera characters were cut, and the story changed to focus on Scooby-Doo and Shaggy's friendship and give Scooby an emotional arc. According to Tony Cervone, the film also took inspiration from Spider-Man: Into the Spider-Verse and is a Scooby-Doo mystery that's bigger, more personal, and goes beyond the typical formula. Cervone also called the film a "love letter" to Hanna-Barbera, in an interview with Jackson Murphy on animationscoop.com.

I think when we first started, this was much more like "Hanna-Barbera Avengers". And then, somehow along the way, the more time we spent with Scooby and Shaggy, we were just like, "This is all we care about". Scooby and Shaggy had their own gravity that took up space.

— Tony Cervone, in an interview to Cinema Blend

=== Casting ===
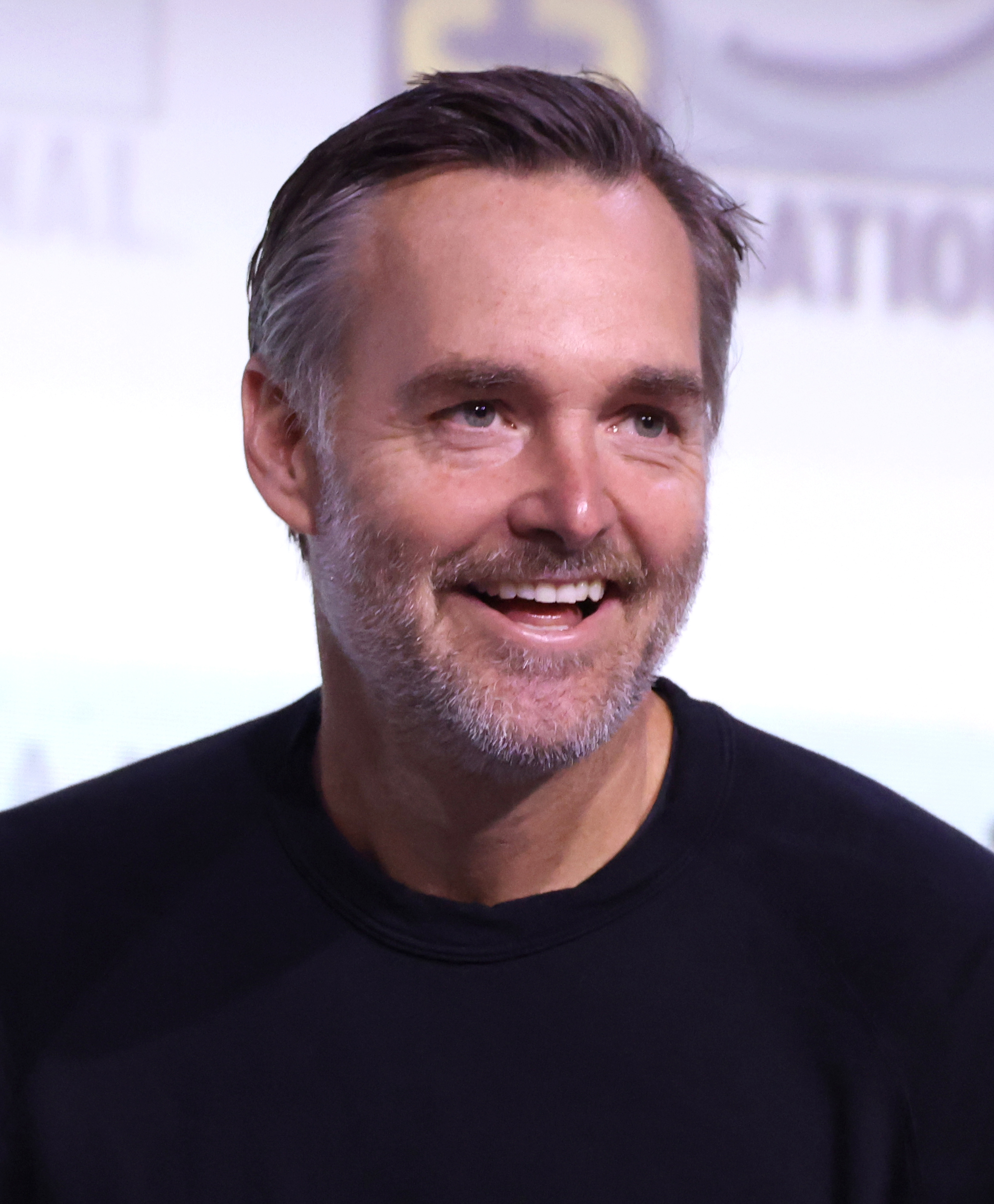
Will Forte
(Shaggy Rogers)

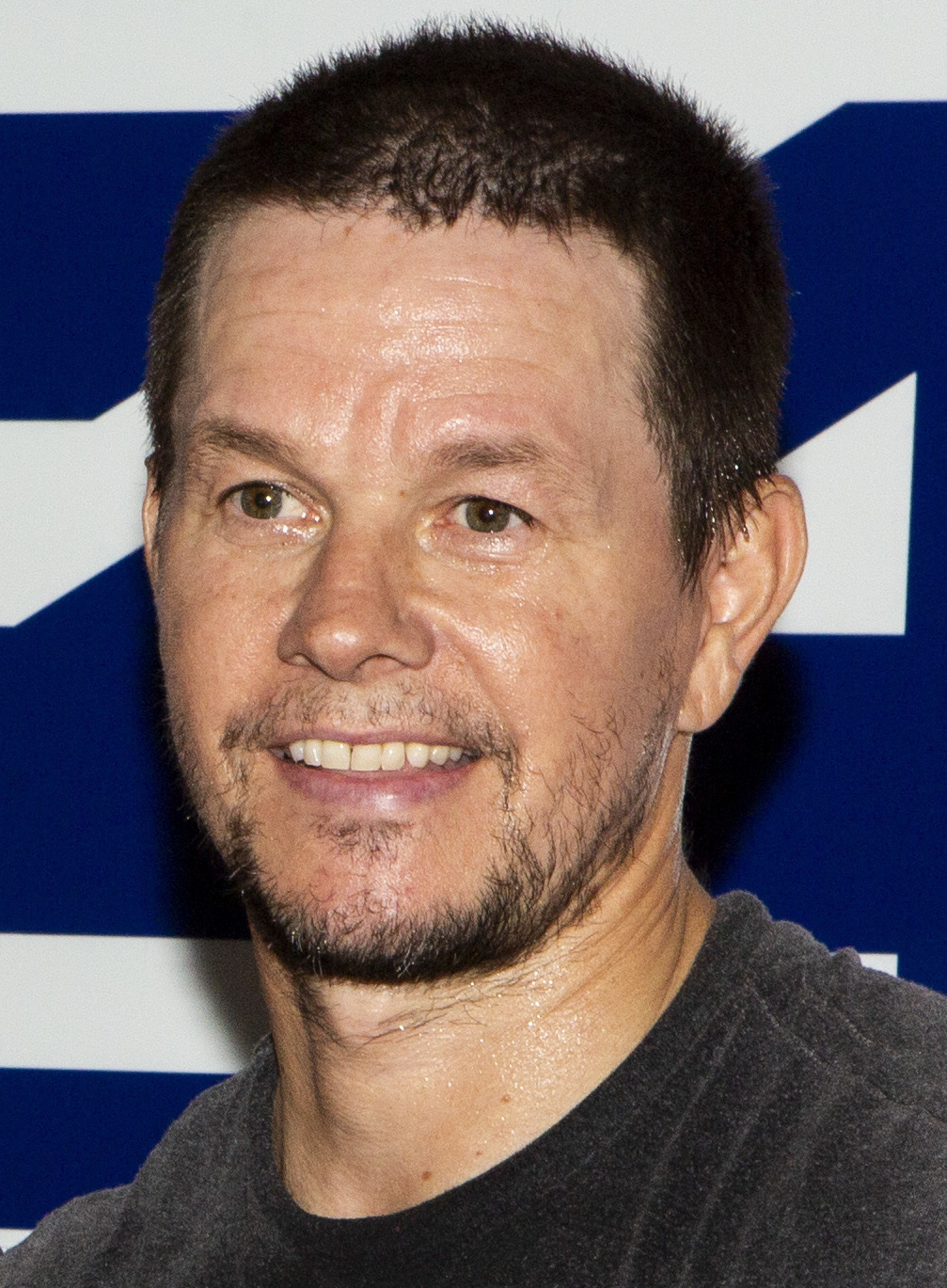
Mark Wahlberg
(Blue Falcon)

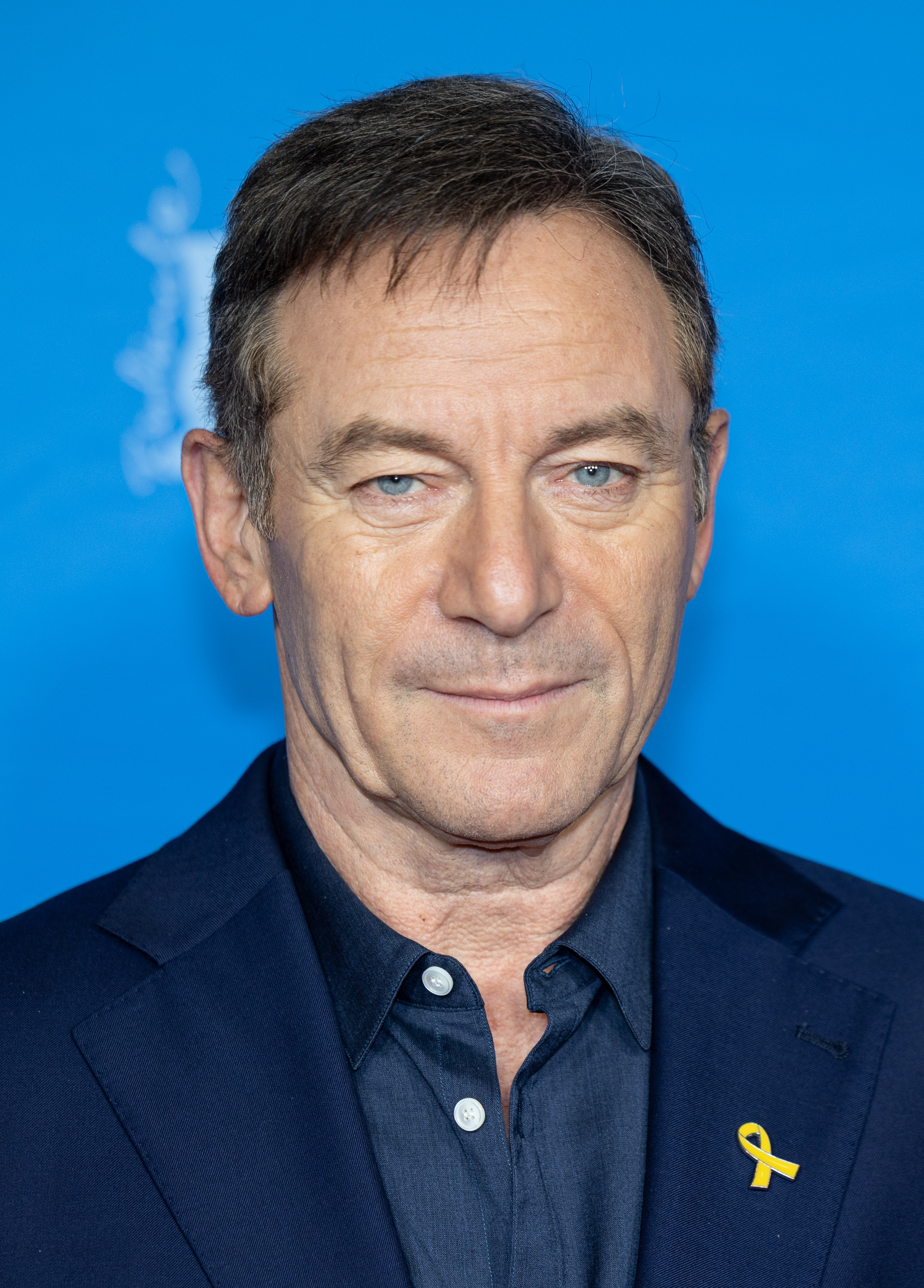
Jason Isaacs
(Dick Dastardly)

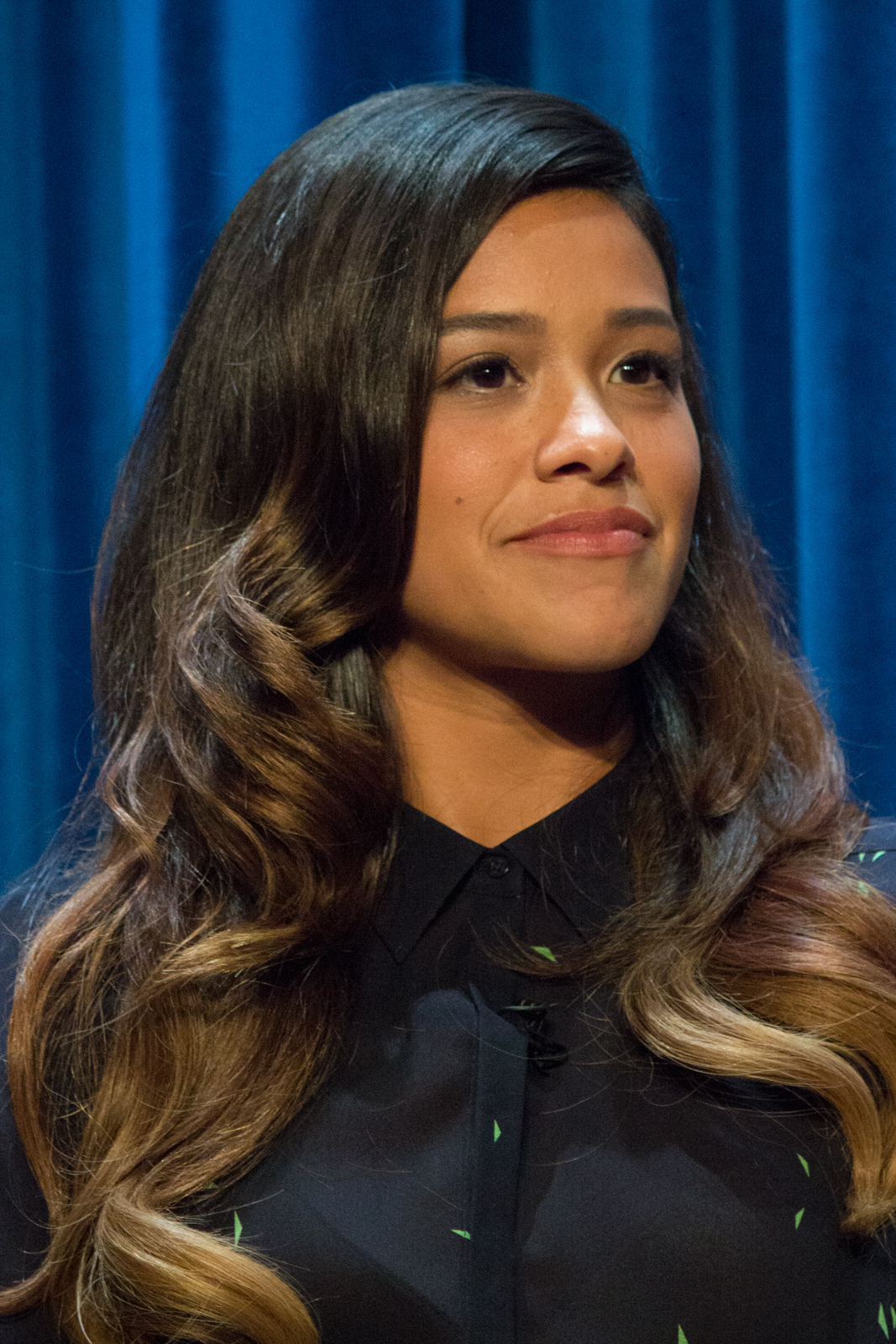
Gina Rodriguez
(Velma Dinkley)

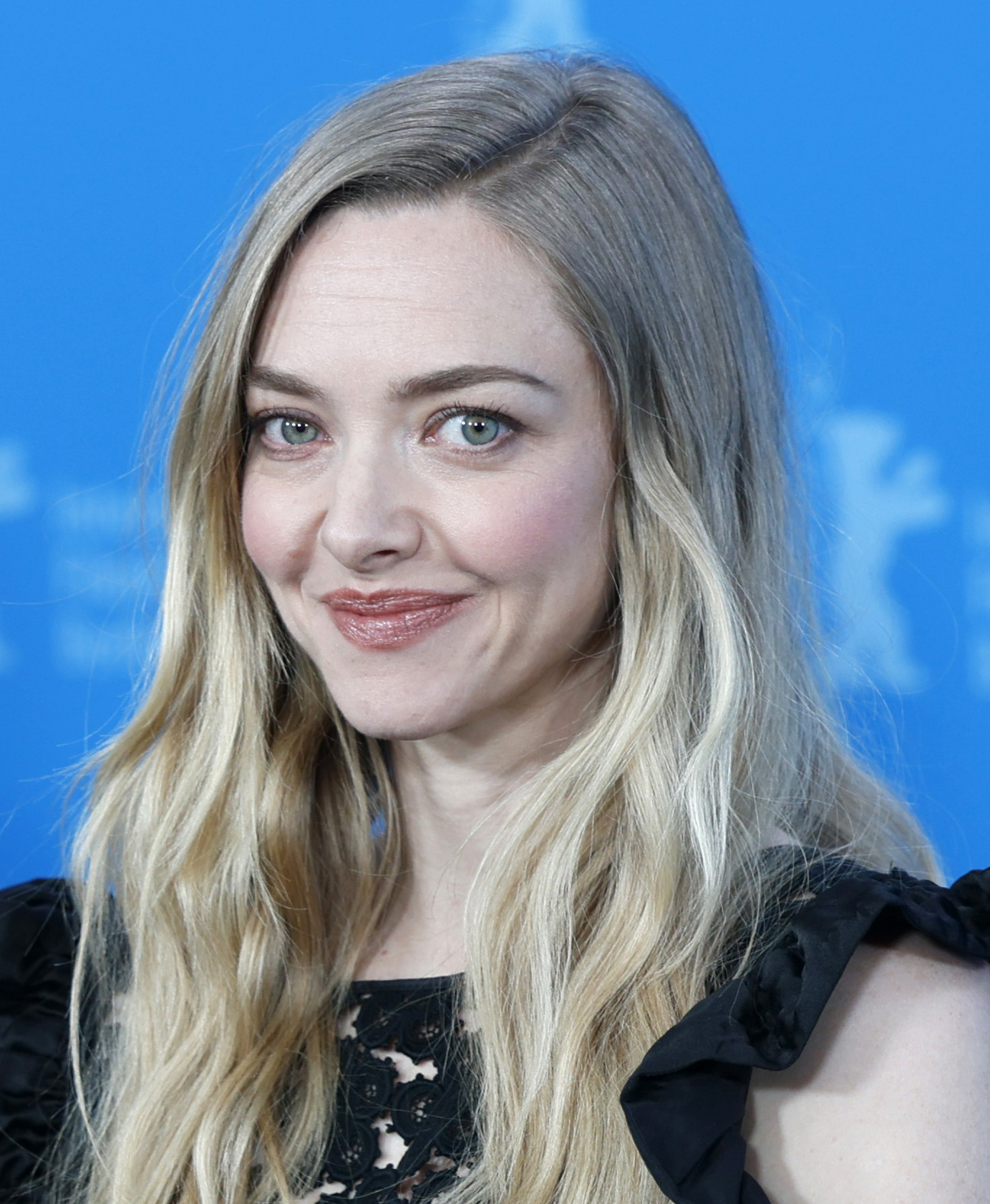
Amanda Seyfried
(Daphne Blake)

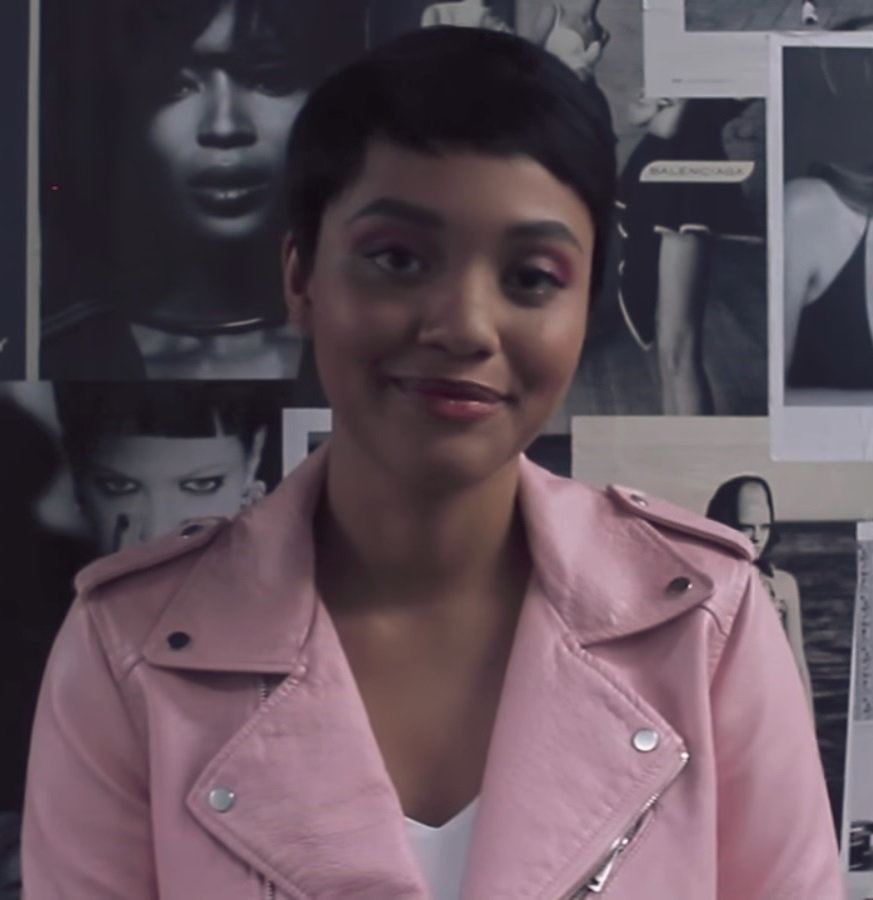
Kiersey Clemons
(Dee Dee Skyes)

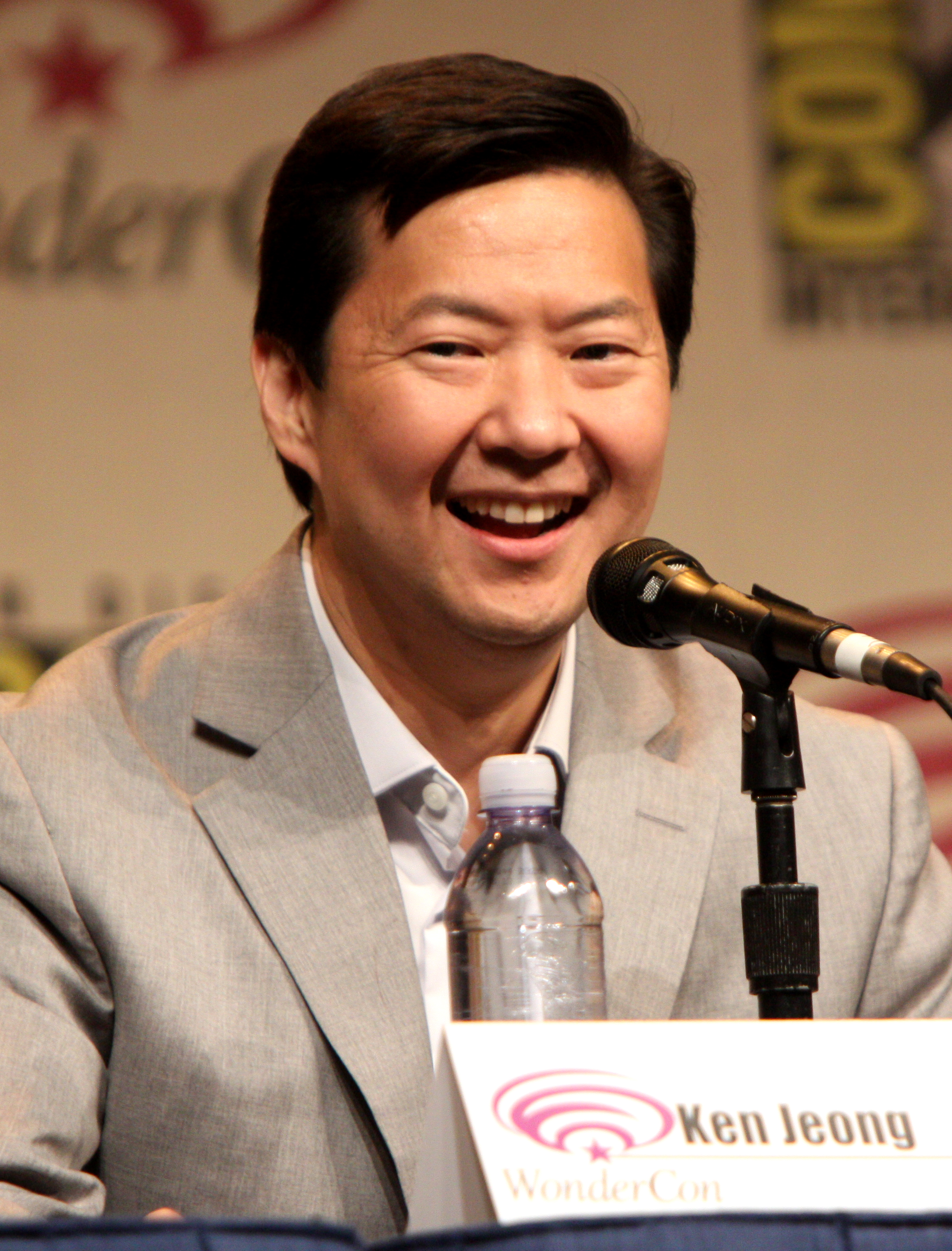
Ken Jeong
(Dynomutt)

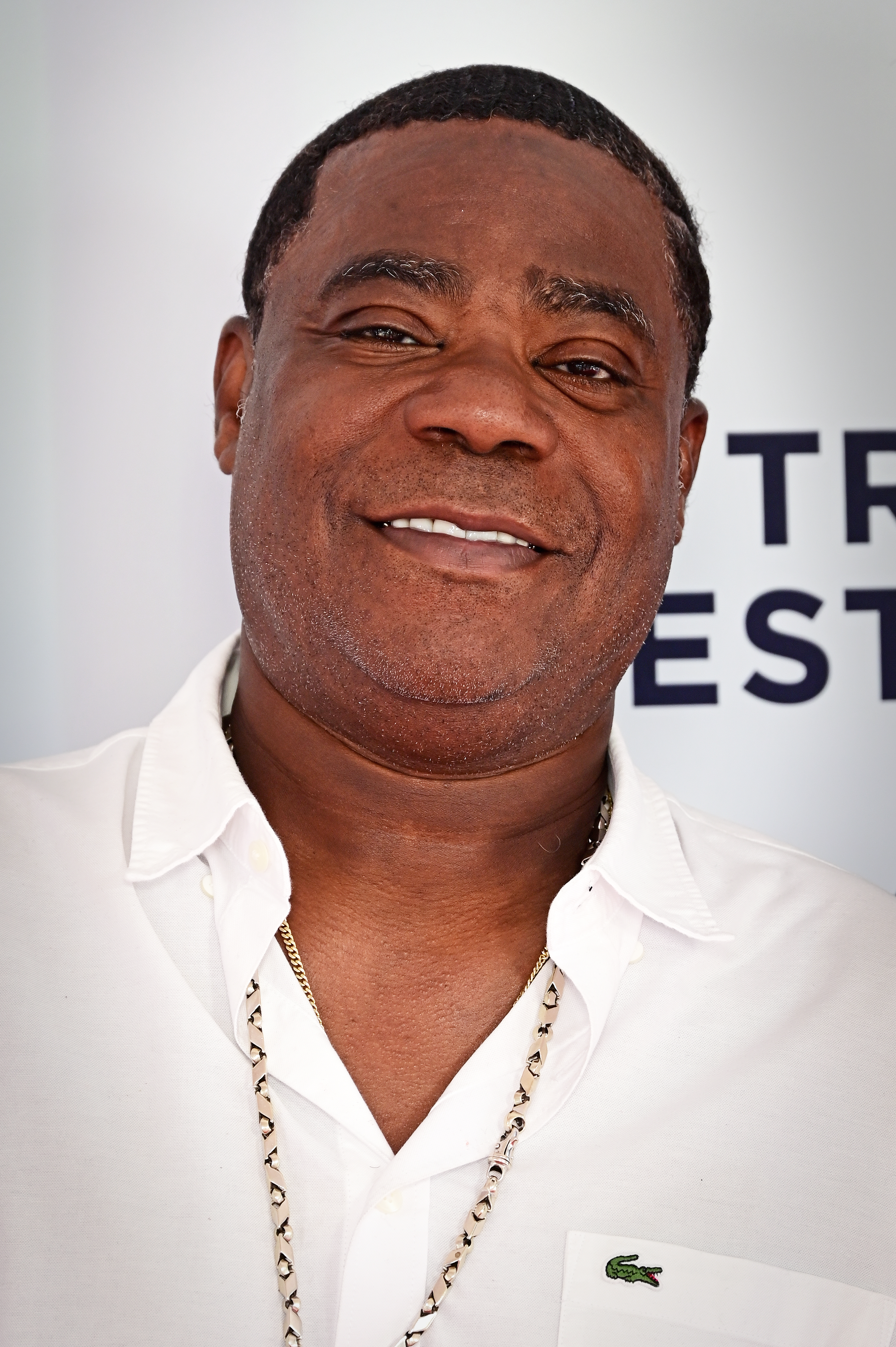
Tracy Morgan
(Captain Caveman)

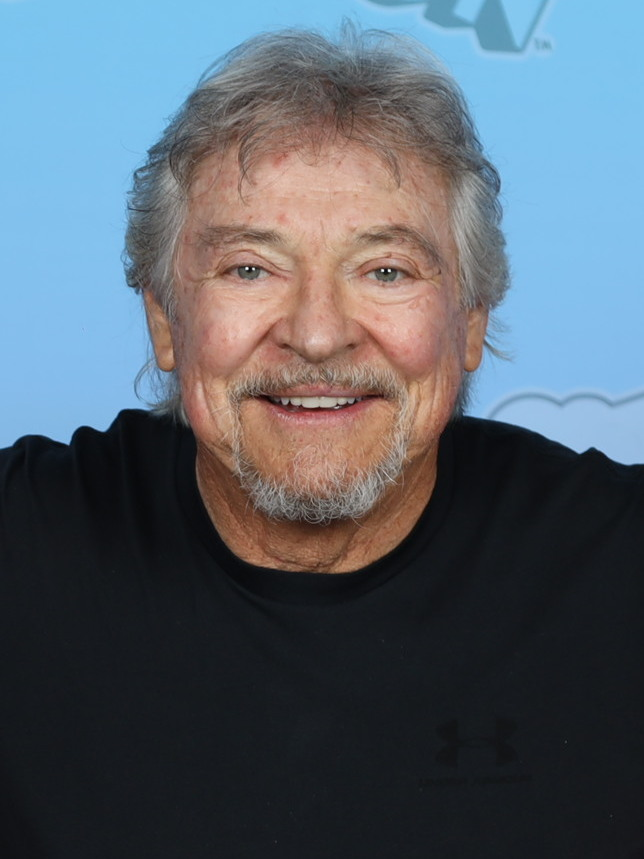
Frank Welker
(Scooby-Doo)

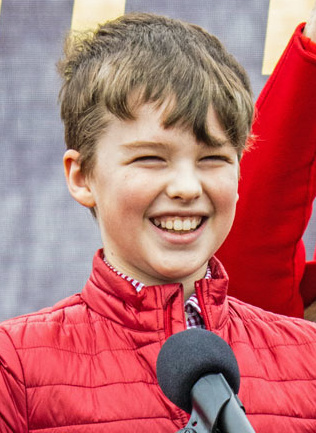
Iain Armitage
(Young Shaggy Rogers)

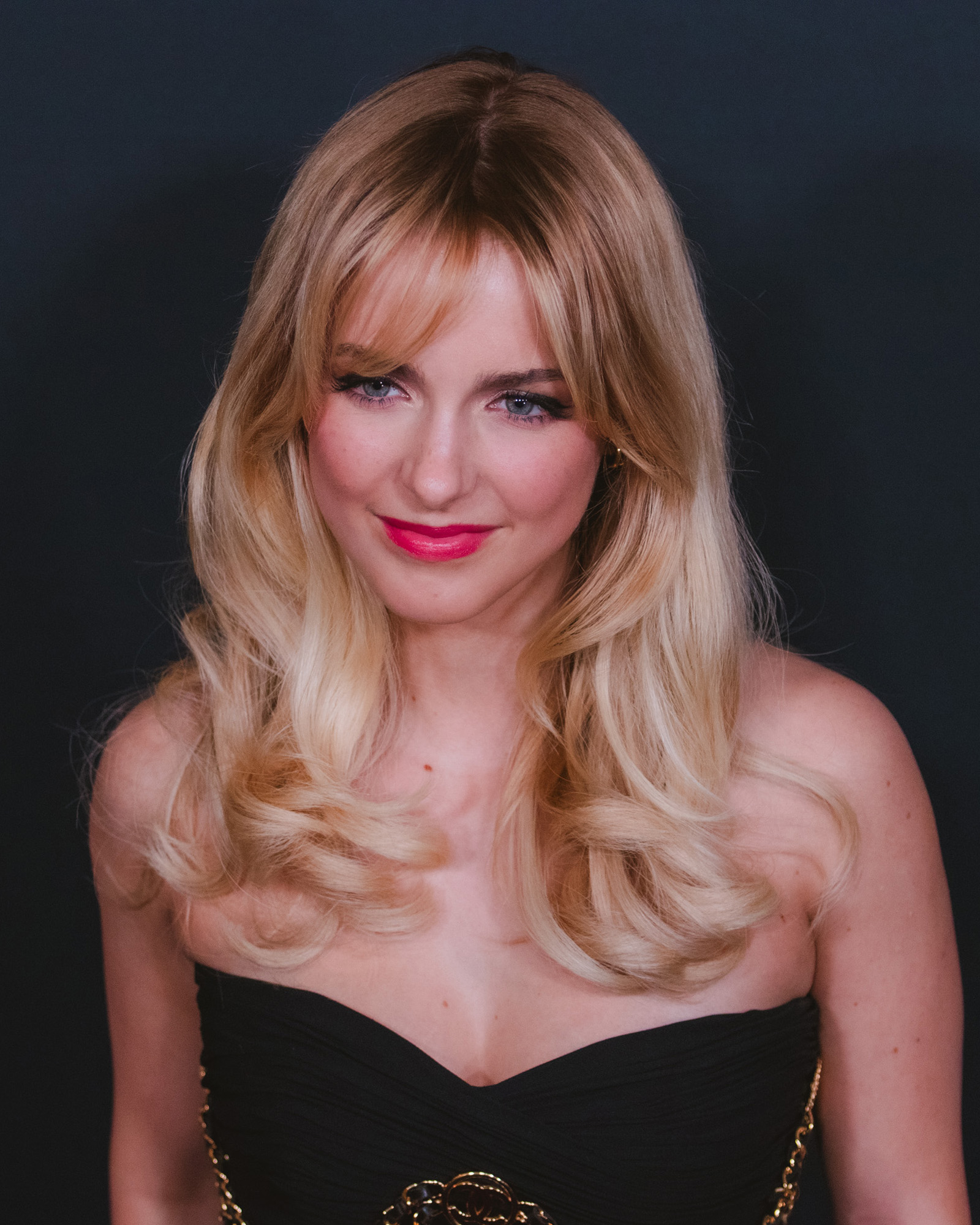
Mckenna Grace
(Young Daphne Blake)

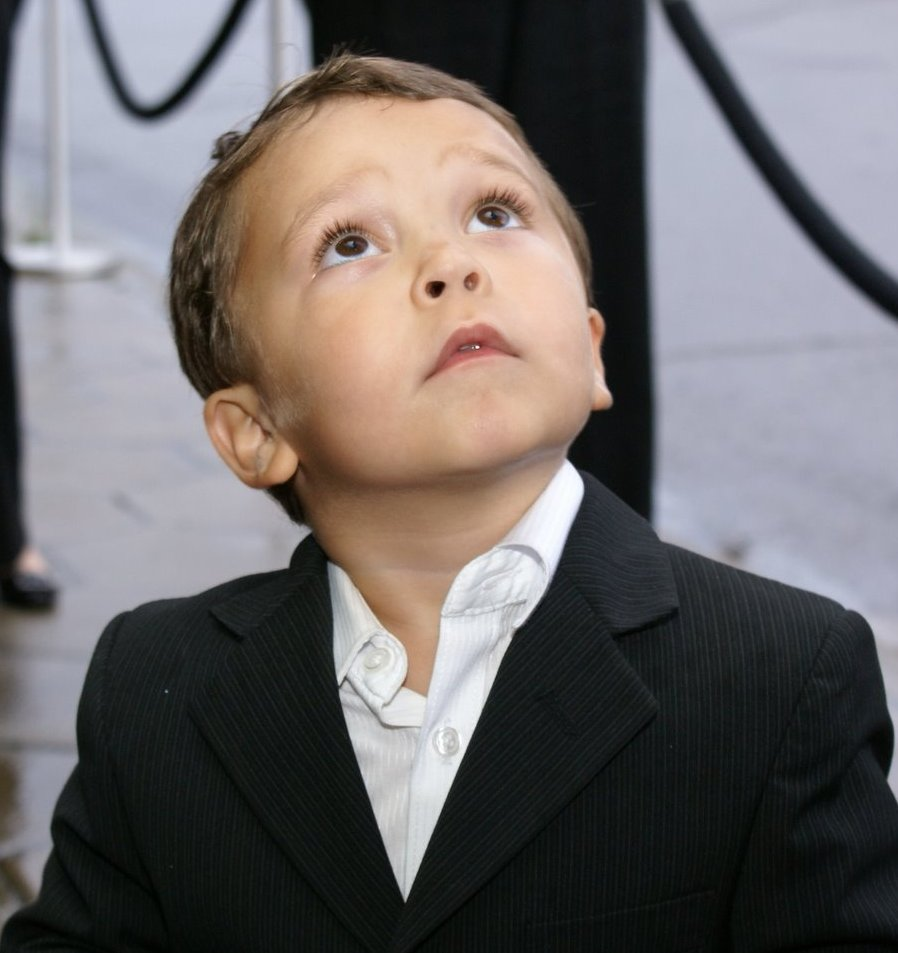
Pierce Gagnon
(Young Fred Jones)

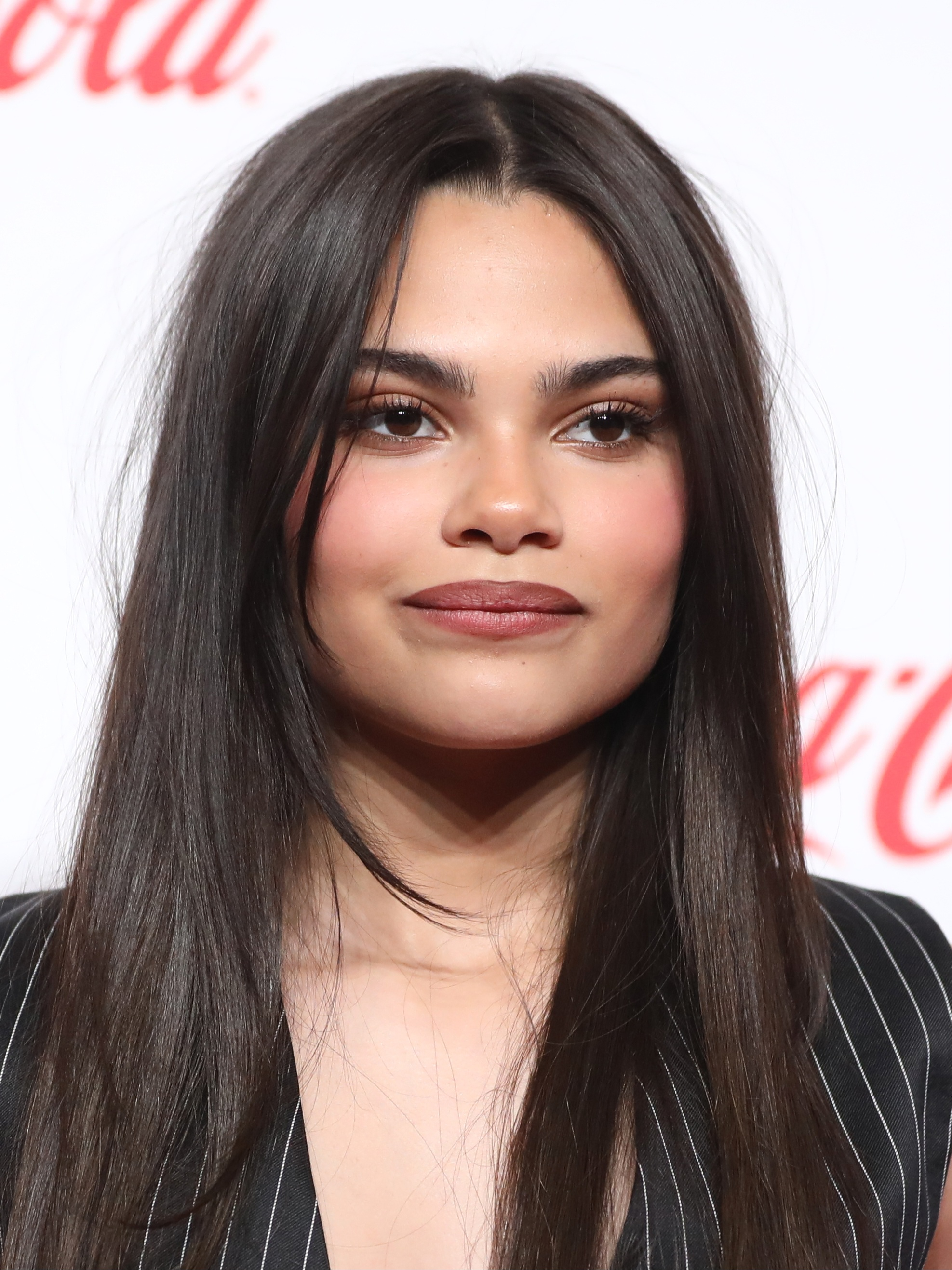
Ariana Greenblatt
(Young Velma Dinkley)

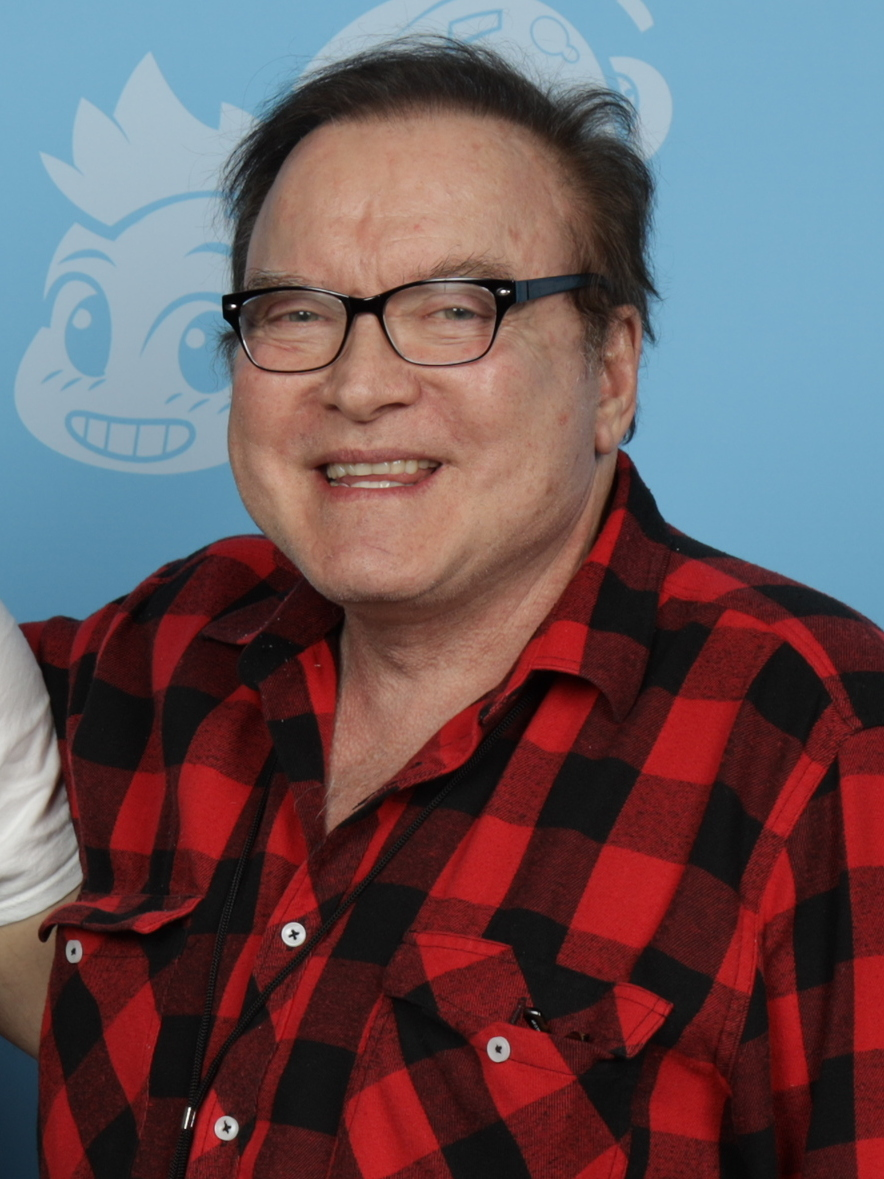
Billy West
(Muttley)

In March 2019, Frank Welker was revealed to reprise as Scooby-Doo, while Will Forte, Gina Rodriguez, and Tracy Morgan had signed on to voice Shaggy, Velma, and Captain Caveman. Forte, a fan of the franchise, aimed to create a more emotional Shaggy, while adding his own spin on voicing him. To homage Casey Kasem's impression, who he considers an icon, and he also praised Matthew Lillard's impression. Rodriguez, another fan of the franchise, aimed to create a more outspoken Velma and was thrilled to voice her as a Latina American, after discussing with director Tony Cervone about how they could sneak her heritage into her. Morgan also loved Captain Caveman growing up, and would even yell out his signature catchphrase when having fun at home. In May 2019, Zac Efron and Amanda Seyfried were cast as Fred and Daphne. Efron's casting marked a rare occasion in which the character has not been voiced by Welker (who has played Fred in most incarnations since the show's debut in 1969). Efron aimed to create a more fun and honest Fred, and Seyfried aimed to create a more empathetic and relatable Daphne. Both Efron and Seyfried were fans of the franchise growing up.

Lillard and Grey Griffin, the current voices of Shaggy and Daphne's regular incarnations, both expressed their disappointment at the news of their roles being recast. Despite this, they still get to voice their mainstream versions, with Lillard wishing the film good luck, and Griffin not holding any hard feelings towards Seyfried or her performance in the film. A different voice cast of younger adults was chosen, as the film aims to be its own stand-alone story and its characters are reimagined young adults exclusively from a modern cinematic universe. The film's cancelled spinoff prequel, Scoob! Holiday Haunt also would have emphasized this, as their kid counterparts are 10 years old and set 10 years before their present timeline. Director Tony Cervone confirms the gang in the movie are in their early 20s.

In April 2019, Ken Jeong and Kiersey Clemons were announced to voice Dynomutt and Dee Dee Skyes. In May 2019, Mark Wahlberg and Jason Isaacs joined to voice Blue Falcon and Dick Dastardly, who Isaacs also wanted to re-imagine as a bigger threat. Mckenna Grace, Iain Armitage, Ariana Greenblatt and Pierce Gagnon were also set as young versions of Daphne, Shaggy, Velma and Fred, respectively. In March 2020, Simon Cowell joined the cast voicing a fictionalized version of himself. Besides being a business entrepreneur in real life, Cowell is also an avid fan of the franchise and was thrilled to take his role. In May 2020, days before the film's release, it was revealed that voice acting veteran Billy West had reprised his role as Dick Dastardly's sidekick, Muttley, and that Cowell's son, Eric, also has a voice role.

Everyone pushed their roles a little bit. It's important the characters remain who they are, but it's interesting to let the actors do their work. Gina's Velma is not the same as everyone else's Velma, and Zac Efron's Fred is not the same as Frank Welker's Fred, but it's still Fred. A lot of people have played Hamlet, over the years.

— Tony Cervone, in an interview to Stack

=== Animation ===
Animation services were provided by Reel FX Animation Studios, who also produced the animation for the 2010s computer-animated Looney Tunes theatrical shorts that Tony Cervone produced. The animators aimed to adapt the classic Hanna-Barbera world and characters into 3D animation, without losing their cartoony charm and spirit. The animators also used early Scooby-Doo cartoons as reference and inspiration for the animation sequences.

=== Music ===
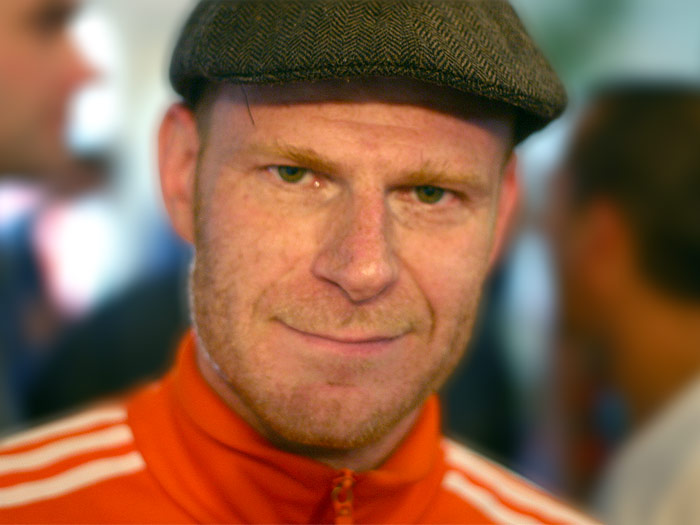
Tom Holkenborg composed the film's score.

On January 28, 2020, Tom Holkenborg signed on to compose the film's original score. On May 5, 2020, it was announced Scoob! The Album would be released on May 15, 2020, including the songs "On Me" by Thomas Rhett and Kane Brown, featuring Ava Max, and "Summer Feelings" by Lennon Stella, featuring Charlie Puth. The soundtrack also includes other songs by various artists, including Faouzia, Sage the Gemini, R3hab, Pink Sweat$, Galantis, Best Coast, Rico Nasty, and Jack Harlow, with the original score being released digitally on May 29, 2020. For the film's music, Holkenborg and director Tony Cervone revisited the original show's music as inspiration. A lot of the music fused the zanier psychedelic elements of the original show with hip-hop beats, to do something new while honoring the original vibe.

== Release ==
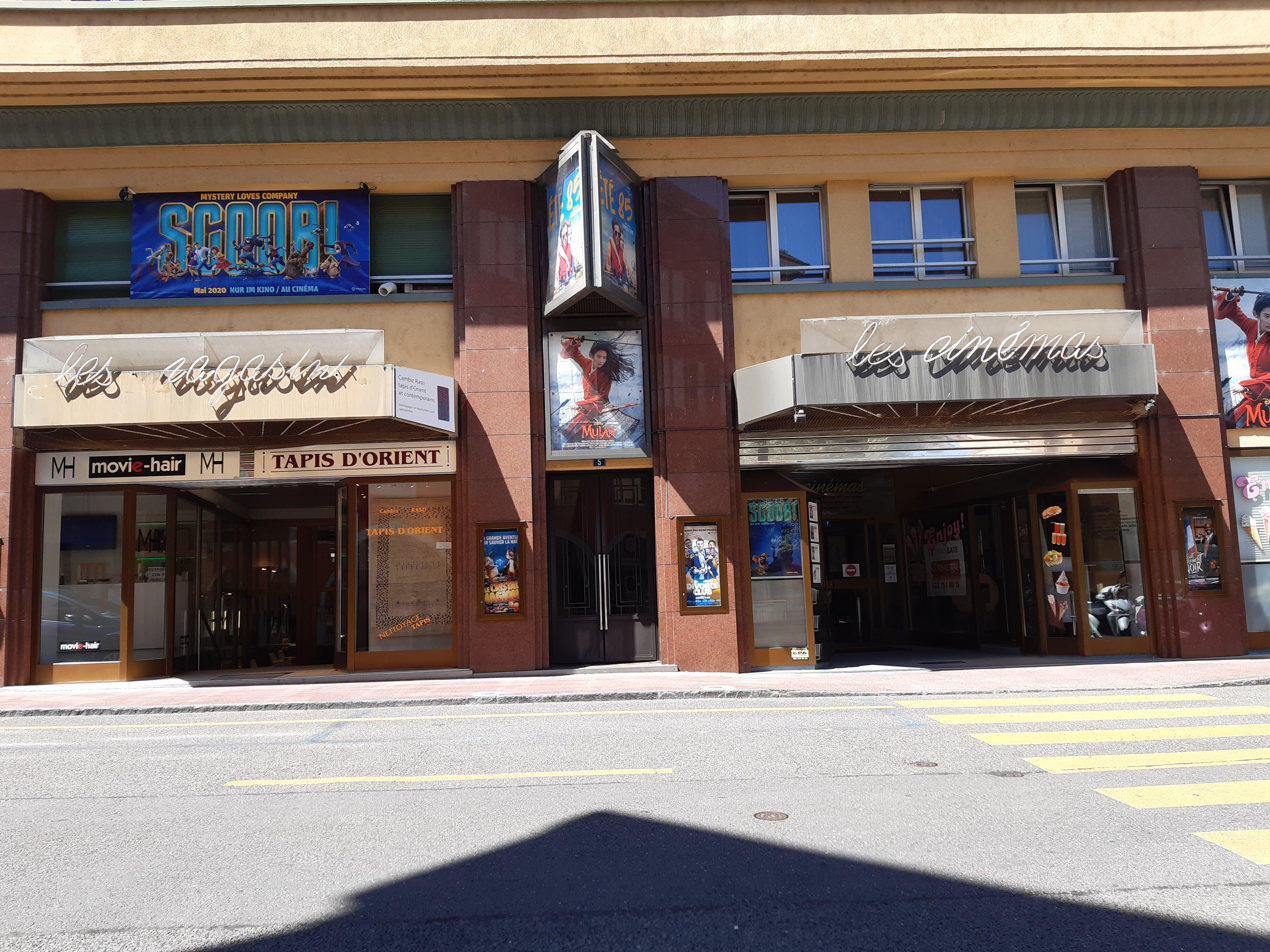
Promotional film advert in Nyon, Switzerland.

Scoob! was originally set for a September 21, 2018 release before being pushed back to May 15, 2020. On March 24, 2020, the film's theatrical release date was delayed indefinitely due to movie theater closures since mid-March, because of COVID-19 pandemic restrictions. It was announced on April 21, 2020, that Warner Bros. had canceled the North American theatrical release and would instead make Scoob! available for digital distribution in the United States through Premium Video on demand on the originally scheduled theatrical date. Variety wrote that releasing the film digitally was "a big risk — and an almost certain loss — for Warner Bros." but noted that the success of Trolls World Tour in a similar release venue could be a positive sign. As the pandemic receded, Warner Bros. confirmed that the film would still play in theaters in select countries, with relaxed COVID-19 restrictions beginning July 8, 2020. The film was reissued in North American theaters for the weekend of May 21–23, 2021.

=== Home media ===
On June 18, 2020, it was announced that Scoob! would be available for streaming on HBO Max beginning June 26, 2020. Scoob! was released on DVD, Blu-ray, and Ultra HD Blu-ray on July 21, 2020.

== Reception ==
=== Box office ===
Scoob! was released in theaters on July 10, 2020, in five countries (France, Netherlands, Germany, Switzerland, and Vietnam), and grossed $1.8 million in its opening weekend. Warner Bros. announced plans to eventually theatrically release the film into 20 markets. Over its second weekend of release, the film made $243,000 from the Netherlands and $266,000 in Spain, as well as finishing third in France. Over the weekend of July 31, the film made $1.3 million from 13 countries. In Spain, the film had a four-week running total of $1.6 million. When the film was issued in North American theaters on May 21, 2021, it debuted in 8th place at the box office over the weekend with $850,000. The film grossed a total of $2.2 million in the United States and Canada and $26.4 million in other territories for a worldwide total of $28.6 million worldwide.

=== VOD sales ===
Scoob! was the top-rented film on Amazon Prime Video, Google Play, FandangoNow, Spectrum, and the iTunes Store in its opening weekend. Although Warner Bros. did not report actual figures, the film had a higher sales count than Trolls: World Tour, which made $100 million over its first three days. It remained the top-rented film across all services in its second weekend, then on three of four services in its third. In its fourth week it remained #1 on FandangoNow, while falling to second on Amazon Prime and fourth on the iTunes charts.

In its fifth weekend of release, Warner Bros. lowered the price from $19.99 to $14.99, and the film finished second on FandangoNow, Amazon Prime, and Spectrum, and fifth on iTunes. While no official numbers were released by Warner Bros., Deadline Hollywood estimated that by mid-June the film had made about 35% to 40% less than Trolls: World Tour (which had itself totaled at least $100 million in sales over its first month). In October 2020, The Hollywood Reporter said the film was the third-most-popular PVOD title amid the COVID-19 pandemic.

=== Critical response ===
On Rotten Tomatoes, the film has an approval rating of 48% based on 152 reviews and an average rating of 5.3/10. The website's critics' consensus reads: "Scoob! is fun enough for youthful viewers and some hardcore fans, but never quite solves the mystery of why audiences shouldn't watch old episodes instead." On Metacritic, the film has a weighted average score of 43 out of 100 based on 33 critics, indicating "mixed or average reviews".

In his review for The Mercury News, Randy Myers wrote, "Scoob! is a goofy and bright surprise – an imaginative reboot that respects its shaggy dog TV roots but is smart enough to add dashes, not shovelfuls, of wry pop-culture and movie references." Michael Phillips of the Chicago Tribune gave the film 2.5 out of 4 stars, writing, "I'm reasonably happy to report that it's a reasonably diverting reboot. It's also ridiculously overpacked, crammed with Hanna-Barbera cartoon characters from various TV series beyond Scooby-Doo, Where Are You!" USA Today's Brian Truitt, who also gave the film 2.5 out of 4 stars, wrote that, "after a super-fun opening, it's all 'Ruh-roh' from there". Peter DeBruge of Variety wrote that "this attractive but calculated attempt to connect Scooby-Doo to other Hanna-Barbera characters abandons the show's fun teen-detective format," and RogerEbert.com's Christy Lemire gave the film 1.5 out of 4 stars, finding the origin story to be "confounding and convoluted for a pretty straightforward Saturday morning cartoon".

=== Accolades ===
At the 46th People's Choice Awards, Scoob! received nominations for the Family Movie of 2020 and The Soundtrack Song of 2020. It also earned a pair of nominations for Best Animated Film from the NAACP Image Awards and the Nickelodeon Kids' Choice Awards. At the 2021 Golden Trailer Awards, the film's "Stay at Home" (Buddha Jones) was nominated for Best Animation TrailerByte for a TV/Streaming Series.

== Cancelled prequel ==
In June 2021, Cervone said that a follow-up to the film was in development. On December 22, 2021, HBO Max released a sizzle reel featuring a first look at a Christmas prequel film, titled Scoob! Holiday Haunt, which was set to be released on the service in December 2022. The film takes place before the events of the first film, with Welker and the child actors from the previous film reprising their roles while Cervone returned to write the film with Paul Dini as well to produce the project. The film was co-directed by the first film's animation director Bill Haller and Michael Kurinsky and had a production budget of $40 million. On August 2, 2022, Warner Bros. Discovery canceled its release, citing cost-cutting measures and a refocus on theatrical films rather than creating projects for streaming. Cervone would go on to say on the same day that the project was "practically finished". Later that month, it was reported that the film would still be finished, though Warner Bros. Discovery had no plans to release the film.
