= Iain Armitage =

American actor (born 2008)

- Armitage in 2026
- Born: July 15, 2008 (age 18); Savannah, Georgia, U.S.
- Occupation: Actor
- Years active: 2012–present
- Known for: Young Sheldon; Big Little Lies
- Father: Euan Morton
- Relatives: Richard Armitage (maternal grandfather)

Iain Marshall Armitage (born July 15, 2008) is an American actor. He is best known for his role as Sheldon Cooper in Young Sheldon, a spin-off prequel to The Big Bang Theory, from 2017 to 2024. He also played Ziggy Chapman in Big Little Lies (2017–2019) and voiced young Shaggy Rogers in Scoob! (2020) and Chase in Paw Patrol: The Movie (2021).

== Early life and career ==
Iain Marshall Armitage was born on July 15, 2008. He first gained prominence appearing in the YouTube series Iain Loves Theatre, where he reviews musical theatre shows. His videos' success caught the attention of the theater industry and led to his receiving offers from agents. In 2015, he served as a correspondent for Perez Hilton during the 2015 Tony Awards and was referenced in the opening number of the show.

In January 2017, Armitage starred in the Law & Order: Special Victims Unit episode "Chasing Theo," playing a kidnapped child. In the same year, he played Ziggy Chapman in the HBO series Big Little Lies and appeared in The Glass Castle, a film adaptation of Jeannette Walls' memoir of the same name. He also appeared in the films I'm Not Here and Our Souls at Night, starring alongside Jane Fonda and Robert Redford.

In March 2017, Armitage was cast as a young Sheldon Cooper in Young Sheldon (2017–2024), a prequel series to the sitcom The Big Bang Theory. In December 2018, he appeared in "The VCR Illumination", an episode of The Big Bang Theory, playing young Sheldon on a videotape recording intended to cheer up and encourage an older Sheldon.

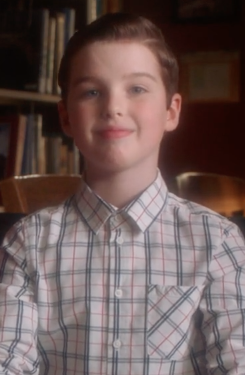
Armitage in 2019

In 2020, Armitage voiced young Shaggy Rogers in the Scooby-Doo film Scoob!. He was set to reprise the role in the film Scoob! Holiday Haunt, which was set for a release in late 2022 on HBO Max, but was canceled in August 2022. In 2021, Armitage voiced Chase in PAW Patrol: The Movie.

== Personal life ==
Armitage is the son of Scottish actor Euan Morton and American theater producer Lee Armitage. He is the grandson of former United States Deputy Secretary of State Richard Lee Armitage. His godfather is former Signature Theatre Artistic Director Eric D. Schaeffer.

Armitage is homeschooled and resides with his family in Arlington, Virginia. The family previously maintained a residence in Manhattan, splitting their time between Arlington and New York City. He has learned to speak multiple languages to different extents, including Russian, Armenian, German, Spanish, Italian, Assyrian, and Sinhalese.

== Filmography ==
=== Film ===
Year	Title	Role	Notes
2017	The Glass Castle	Young Brian Walls	Film debut
2017	Our Souls at Night	Jamie Moore	
2017	I'm Not Here	Stevie	
2020	Scoob!	Young Shaggy Rogers (voice)	
2021	Paw Patrol: The Movie	Chase (voice)	
TBA	The Adam Trials		

=== Television ===
Year	Title	Role	Notes
2014	Impractical Jokers	Himself	Episode: "Look Out Below"
2016	Little Big Shots	Guest judge	Episode: "The Idiom of Love"
2017	Law & Order: Special Victims Unit	Theo Lachere	Episode: "Chasing Theo"
2017–2019	Big Little Lies	Ziggy Chapman	Main role
2017–2024	Young Sheldon	Sheldon Cooper	Main role
2018	Jeopardy!	Video Clue Giver	6 episodes
2018	The Big Bang Theory	Young Sheldon Cooper	Episode: "The VCR Illumination"
2020	Nickelodeon's Unfiltered	Himself	2 episodes
2020	Group Chat	Himself	Episode: "Group Chat Unleashed – Party Pooper Prank"
2022	The Price Is Right at Night	Himself (Note: Armitage and Raegan Revord appear as special guests, not contestants.)	Episode: "The Price is Right at Night with Iain Armitage and Raegan Revord"
2022	Ghostwriter	Wilbur (voice)	2 episodes
2026	Ghosts	Himself	Episode: "Woodstone Royale"

=== Web ===
Year	Title	Role
2012–present	Iain Loves Theatre	Presenter

== Awards and nominations ==
Year	Award	Category	Nominee	Result	Ref.
2018	Young Artist Awards	Best Performance in a TV Series – Leading Young Actor	Young Sheldon	Won	
2018	Teen Choice Awards	Choice Breakout TV Star	Young Sheldon	Nominated	
2020	Screen Actors Guild Awards	Outstanding Performance by an Ensemble in a Drama Series	Big Little Lies	Nominated	
2021	Kids' Choice Awards	Favorite Male TV Star	Young Sheldon	Nominated	
2022	Critics' Choice Awards	Best Actor in a Comedy Series	Young Sheldon	Nominated	
2022	Kids' Choice Awards	Favorite Male TV Star	Young Sheldon	Nominated	
2024	Kids' Choice Awards	Favorite Male TV Star	Young Sheldon	Won	
2024	Astra TV Awards	Best Actor in a Broadcast Network or Cable Comedy Series	Young Sheldon	Nominated	
