= Allison Abbate =

American film producer and animator

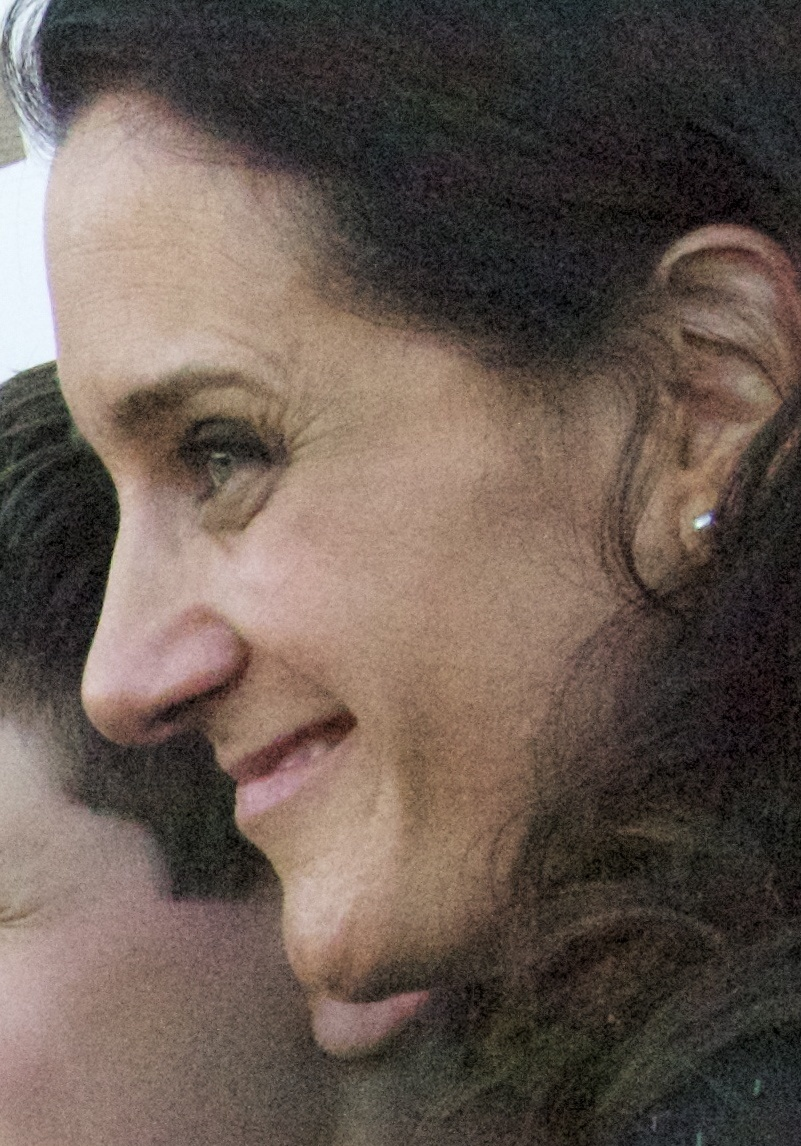
- Abbate in 2012
- Born: Allison Therese Abbate; July 23, 1965 (age 61); Brooklyn, New York, U.S.
- Occupations: Film producer, animator
- Years active: 1988–present
- Spouse: Tony Cervone (m. 2012)

Allison Therese Abbate (born July 23, 1965) is an American film producer and animator, primarily of animated films.

== Biography ==
Abbate gained experience in animation while working on The Little Mermaid for The Walt Disney Company, before working on The Rescuers Down Under and The Nightmare Before Christmas where she first met Tim Burton.

She first worked with Warner Bros. as a co-producer on the film Space Jam in 1996. She then helped produce The Iron Giant for which she won a BAFTA award. In 2006 she was nominated for a "Motion Picture Producer of the Year" award by the Producers Guild of America for her work on Corpse Bride.

Abbate shifted to the United Kingdom in 2004 to set up an animation production facility for 3 Mills Studios. In 2004, Abbate moved to the United Kingdom to set up an animation production facility at 3 Mills Studios. While in the United Kingdom, she produced Corpse Bride, Fantastic Mr. Fox, and Frankenweenie at 3 Mills Studios in London.In 2009, she worked on Fantastic Mr. Fox. She was also the voice of Rabbit's ex-girlfriend in the film. Abbate later worked on Burton's Frankenweenie, making it her third major project with Burton (alongside Corpse Bride and The Nightmare Before Christmas).

Abbate has been married to Tony Cervone, an animation director, writer and producer, since 2012. She returned to the United States in 2012 to serve as an executive producer on Warner Animation Group's first feature, The Lego Movie, released in 2014.

In 2017 she was appointed as the Executive Vice President of Warner Animation Group and oversaw films like The Lego Ninjago Movie, Scoob!, Smallfoot, The Lego Movie 2: The Second Part, Tom and Jerry, Space Jam: A New Legacy and DC League of Super-Pets. She decided to step down in August 2022 after the merger of WarnerMedia and Discovery, Inc.

== Filmography ==
- Out of This World (1988) (production associate)
- The Rescuers Down Under (1990) (assistant production manager: layout/retakes)
- The Nightmare Before Christmas (1993) (artistic coordinator)
- Runaway Brain (1995) (associate producer)
- Space Jam (1996) (animation co-producer)
- The Iron Giant (1999) (producer)
- Looney Tunes: Back in Action (2003) (animation producer)
- Corpse Bride (2005) (producer)
- Fantastic Mr. Fox (2009) (producer)
- Frankenweenie (2012) (producer)
- The Lego Movie (2014) (executive producer)
- Smallfoot (2018) (executive producer)
- Scoob! (2020) (producer)
- Tom & Jerry (2021) (executive producer)
- Space Jam: A New Legacy (2021) (executive producer)
- DC League of Super-Pets (2022) (executive producer)
- Coyote vs. Acme (2026) (executive producer)
