= Pierce Gagnon =

American actor (born 2005)

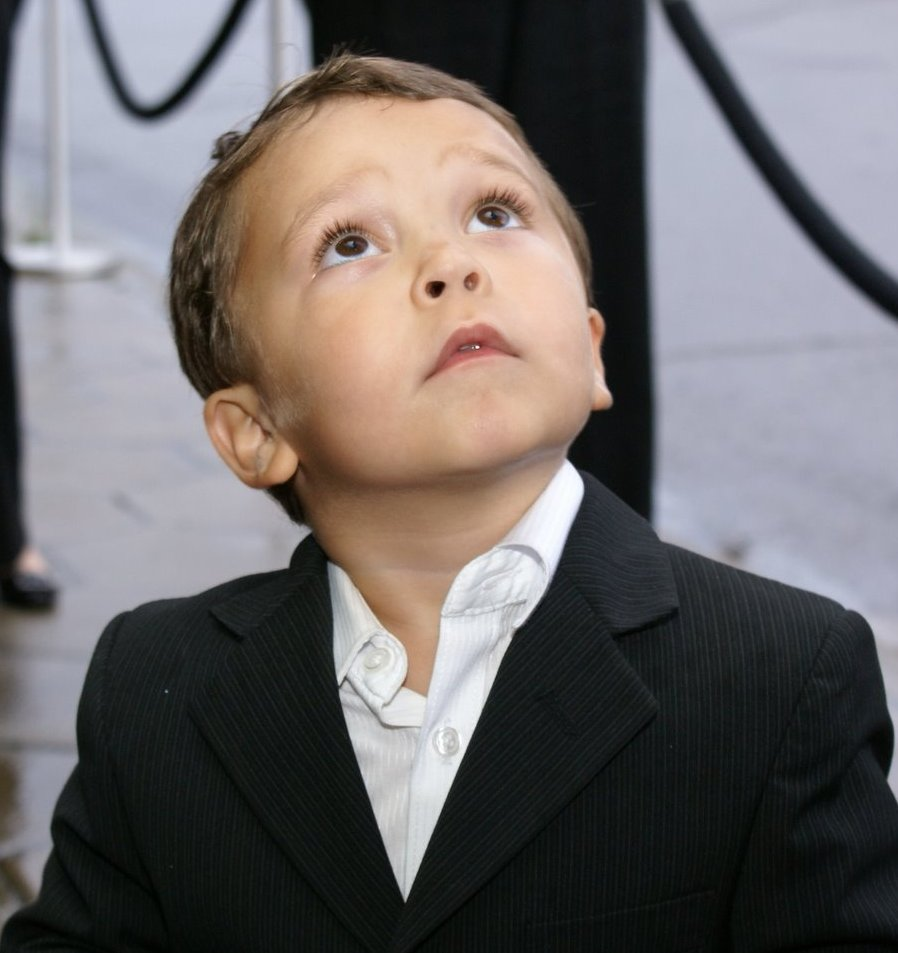
- Gagnon in 2009
- Born: July 25, 2005 (age 21); Atlanta, Georgia, U.S.
- Occupation: Actor
- Years active: 2010–present

Pierce Gagnon (born July 25, 2005) is an American actor. He is known for his roles in the film Looper and in the CBS series Extant, as well as voicing Tim Templeton in the Netflix series The Boss Baby: Back in Business.

== Personal life ==
Gagnon was born on July 25, 2005, in Atlanta, Georgia. He has three younger siblings, including his brother Steele. He resides in Los Angeles, California.

== Career ==
Gagnon played Logan Evans, the son of Clay Evans (Robert Buckley), in season 9 of the CW drama series One Tree Hill.

In 2011, he was cast in the action thriller film Looper as Cid Harrington, a child with unusual telekinetic abilities, who becomes a warlord called the "Rainmaker". Rian Johnson said, "Looking back I'm kind of terrified that I hinged the success of the backend of the movie on finding someone like Pierce. It's really rare to find a kid who can do what he does. He would do three-page dialogue scenes with Emily [Blunt] and Joe [Gordon-Levitt] and hold his own against them all the way through."

After voicing Tiago in Rio 2, the sequel to the 2011 film Rio, Gagnon played Tucker Bloom in the comedy-drama film Wish I Was Here. He played Ethan Woods, the android son of Molly Woods (Halle Berry), in the CBS science fiction drama series Extant. Gagnon was named one of the best actors under twenty years of age.

In 2017, he played Sonny Jim Jones, the son of Dougie and Jane Jones (Naomi Watts), in the Showtime series Twin Peaks. From 2018 to 2020, he has voiced the character of Tim Templeton on the Netflix animated series The Boss Baby: Back in Business.

In 2020, Gagnon voiced the role of Young Fred Jones in the Scooby-Doo film Scoob!. He was set to reprise the role in the film Scoob! Holiday Haunt, which was set for release in 2022 on HBO Max, but the release was canceled in August 2022.

== Filmography ==
=== Film ===
Year	Title	Role	Notes
2010	The Crazies	Distraught Son	
2010	The Way Home	Little Joe	
2012	Looper	Cid Harrington	
2014	Wish I Was Here	Tucker Bloom	
2014	Rio 2	Tiago	Voice role
2014	A Merry Friggin' Christmas	Douglas Mitchler	
2015	Tomorrowland	Nate Newton	
2020	Scoob!	Young Fred Jones	Voice role
2022	The Boss Baby: Christmas Bonus	Timothy Leslie "Tim" Templeton,	Voice role

=== Television ===
Year	Title	Role	Notes
2012	One Tree Hill	Logan Evans	Recurring role
2014–15	Extant	Ethan Woods	Main cast
2017	Twin Peaks: The Return	Sonny Jim Jones	Recurring role
2018–20	The Boss Baby: Back in Business	Timothy Leslie "Tim" Templeton (voice)	Main cast
2020	The Loud House	Ryan Miller (voice)	Episode: "Family Bonding"
