= Frankenweenie (2012 film) =

2012 stop-motion animated film by Tim Burton

- Theatrical release poster
- Directed by: Tim Burton
- Screenplay by: John August
- Based on: Frankenweenie by: Lenny Ripps (screenplay); Tim Burton (story)
- Produced by: Tim Burton; Allison Abbate
- Starring: Catherine O'Hara; Martin Short; Martin Landau; Charlie Tahan; Atticus Shaffer; Winona Ryder
- Cinematography: Peter Sorg
- Edited by: Chris Lebenzon; Mark Solomon
- Music by: Danny Elfman
- Production companies: Walt Disney Pictures; Tim Burton Productions
- Distributed by: Walt Disney Studios; Motion Pictures
- Release dates: September 20, 2012 (Fantastic Fest); October 5, 2012 (United States)
- Running time: 87 minutes
- Country: United States
- Language: English
- Budget: $39 million
- Box office: $87 million

Frankenweenie is a 2012 American stop motion-animated science fiction horror film directed by Tim Burton, written by John August, and featuring the voices of Catherine O'Hara, Martin Short, Martin Landau, Charlie Tahan, Atticus Shaffer, and Winona Ryder. A co-production between Walt Disney Pictures and Tim Burton Productions, it is a feature-length remake of the 1984 short film. The film follows a boy named Victor Frankenstein who uses the power of electricity to resurrect his dead dog Sparky, but his peers discover what he has done and reanimate their own deceased pets and other creatures, resulting in mayhem.

Frankenweenie initially began development in November 2005, with a script written by Josann McGibbon and Sara Parriott. In December 2007, Burton was asked to direct two 3D films for Disney, including a 2010 live-action adaptation of Alice in Wonderland. Filming began at 3 Mills Studios in July 2010. The tongue-in-cheek film contains numerous references to and parodies of Frankenstein and past film versions of it, other literary classics, various horror and science-fiction films, and other films which Burton has directed or produced.

Frankenweenie premiered at Fantastic Fest on September 20, 2012, and was released in the United States on October 5, to generally positive reviews for its visuals and story. It was a moderate box office success, grossing $82 million against a $39 million budget. It won the Saturn Award for Best Animated Film, and was nominated for an Academy Award, a Golden Globe, a BAFTA, and an Annie Award for Best Animated Film.

== Plot ==
Victor Frankenstein, a young scientist and amateur filmmaker, lives with his parents, Susan and Edward, and his beloved bull terrier, Sparky, in the quiet town of New Holland. He does not interact much with his classmates, who include his somber next-door neighbor Elsa Van Helsing, the mischievous Edgar "E" Gore, the naive Bob, the pretentious Toshiaki, the sinister Nassor, and an eccentric "Weird Girl". Concerned with Victor’s isolation, Edward encourages him to take up baseball. When Victor hits a home run at his first game, Sparky chases the ball, but is struck and killed by a car, leaving Victor despondent.

Inspired by his science teacher Mr. Rzykruski's demonstration of the effect of electricity on dead frogs, Victor digs up Sparky, brings him to a makeshift laboratory in his attic, and reanimates him with a bolt of lightning. Victor is elated by Sparky's revival, but keeps him hidden in the attic. While Victor is at school the next day, Sparky escapes the attic to chase the Weird Girl's cat, Mr. Whiskers, and explore the neighborhood. He is recognized by Edgar, who blackmails Victor into teaching him how to raise the dead. Together, the two resurrect a dead goldfish, which inexplicably becomes invisible. Edgar brags about the fish to his classmates, but the fish disappears when he tries to show it to a skeptical Nassor.

Fearful of losing the upcoming science fair, Toshiaki and Bob create a jetpack from soda bottles, but their test ends with Bob falling off his roof and breaking his arm. The townsfolk blame Mr. Rzykruski for the incident, accusing him of negatively influencing their children. When Susan and Edward call upon Mr. Rzykruski to speak in his defense, he gives a tactlessly insulting and threatening speech which results in his dismissal, and the gym teacher replaces him. Before Mr. Rzykruski leaves the school, Victor learns from him that the differing outcomes of his experiment were influenced by his emotional attachment. Edgar accidentally reveals Victor's role in reviving the fish and Sparky to Toshiaki, Nassor, and Bob, inspiring them to conduct their own reanimation experiments.

Victor's parents are shocked to discover Sparky in the attic, causing the dog to flee. Although upset by the gravity of Victor's actions, they set out with him to find Sparky. When the family leaves, Victor's classmates invade the lab and discover Victor's reanimation research. When they perform their experiments separately, their competitive sentiment turns each of their dead animals into a monster: Mr. Whiskers holds a dead bat while he is electrocuted, resulting in both animals being fused into a vampiric feline; a dead rat Edgar found in the garbage turns into a wererat; Nassor's mummified hamster Colossus comes back to life; Toshiaki's turtle Shelley is covered in Miracle-Gro and becomes a kaiju; and Bob's expired Sea-Monkeys grow into amphibious humanoids similar to Gremlins. The monsters converge on the town fair and wreak havoc.

After finding Sparky at the town's pet cemetery, Victor is alerted to the monster attacks and goes to help his classmates: the Sea-Monkeys explode after eating salted popcorn, Colossus is stepped on by Shelley, and the wererat and Shelley both return to their original, deceased forms after getting electrocuted. During the chaos, Persephone, Elsa's pet poodle, is grabbed by Mr. Whiskers and carried to the town windmill, with Elsa and Victor giving pursuit. The townsfolk blame Sparky for Elsa's disappearance and chase him to the windmill, which Elsa's uncle accidentally ignites with his torch. Victor and Sparky enter the burning windmill and rescue Elsa and Persephone. However, Victor ends up being trapped inside. Sparky rescues Victor, only to be dragged back inside by Mr. Whiskers, who is fatally impaled by a flaming piece of wood just before the windmill collapses, killing Sparky again.

The townsfolk, moved by Sparky's heroism, gather and revive Sparky with their car batteries. Persephone runs to Sparky, and they touch noses, producing a spark.

== Voice cast ==
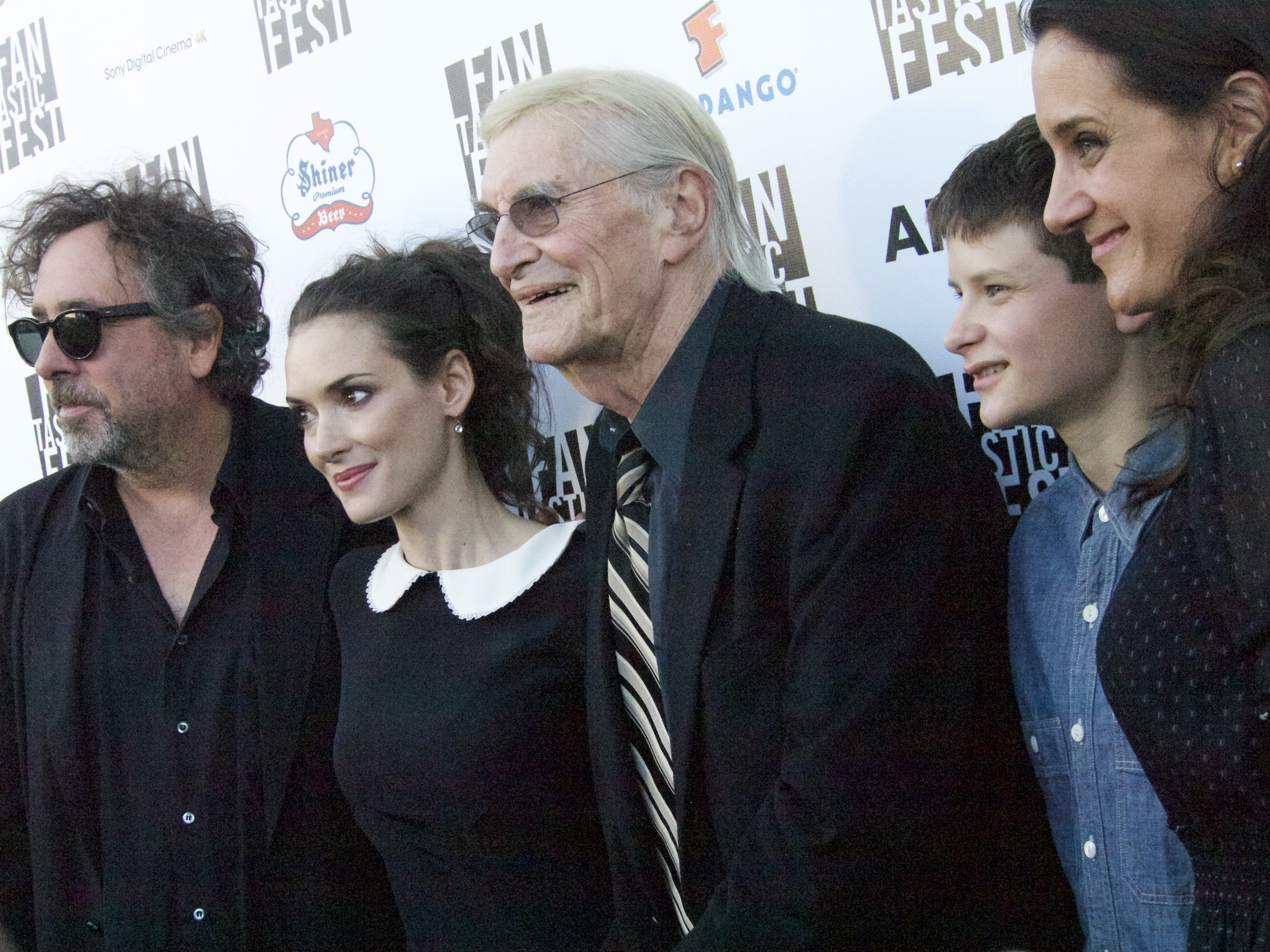
Tim Burton, Winona Ryder, Martin Landau, Charlie Tahan, and Allison Abbate at the film's premiere at the Fantastic Fest in Austin, Texas.

- Charlie Tahan as Victor Frankenstein, a young scientist who brings his dog, Sparky, back to life.
- Catherine O'Hara as:
  - Susan Frankenstein, Victor's mother.
  - Weird Girl, Victor's unnamed eccentric classmate who is obsessed with the psychic predictions of her cat, Mr. Whiskers.
  - The Gym Teacher who replaces Mr. Rzykruski as science teacher when he gets fired and has no knowledge of science.
- Martin Short as:
  - Edward Frankenstein, Victor's father.
  - Mr. Burgermeister, the grumpy Mayor of New Holland who is the Frankenstein family's next-door neighbor and Elsa's uncle. Burgermeister is an homage to the villainous Burgermeister Meisterburger from the 1970 Rankin/Bass television special Santa Claus Is Comin' to Town.
  - Nassor, Victor's classmate who was the owner of Colossus the hamster. Nassor has a flat head inspired by Frankenstein's monster, and his voice and face resemble that of Boris Karloff, who played Frankenstein in the 1931 Frankenstein film.
- Martin Landau as Mr. Rzykruski, the eccentric, but wise, science teacher at Victor's school who has a thick Eastern European accent. His teachings inspire Victor's effort to resurrect Sparky and he acts as a mentor to Victor. Rzykruski was inspired by Burton's childhood icon Vincent Price.
- Atticus Shaffer as Edgar "E" Gore, Victor's classmate who is the first to discover Victor brought Sparky back to life. Edgar was inspired by the Igor stock character and has a hunch-back.
- Winona Ryder as Elsa Van Helsing, Victor's kind classmate and next-door neighbor, Burgermeister's niece, and Persephone's owner.
- Robert Capron as Bob, Victor's classmate and Toshiaki's science fair partner.
- James Hiroyuki Liao as Toshiaki, Victor's most competitive classmate, Bob's science fair partner, and the former owner of Shelly the turtle.
- Conchata Ferrell as Bob's Mom, a stereotypical suburban housewife who dotes upon her son. She believes in the status quo and that her misguided actions are in Bob's best interest.
- Tom Kenny as the New Holland Towns Folk, the ones that speak are the fire chief, a soldier, and a man in the crowd during Mayor Burgermeister's town meeting revolving around Mr. Rzykrusi's teachings.

Actor Christopher Lee, who had worked with Tim Burton on five earlier films, makes an appearance via the inclusion of a live-action clip from his 1958 film Dracula.

== Production ==
=== Development ===
Although Tim Burton signed with Walt Disney Pictures to direct two films in Disney Digital 3-D (2010's Alice in Wonderland and this film), development of a full-length stop-motion Frankenweenie dates as far back as November 2005, when scripts had been written by Josann McGibbon and Sara Parriott. John August was approached to do a rewrite in 2006, but was not hired until January 2009.

Like the original short film, this feature version was shot in black-and-white. Many of the animation artists and crew from Corpse Bride (2005) were involved in the production of the film. Burton borrowed heavily from his design for the titular character of Family Dog (1993) for Sparky.

=== Filming ===
Filming began at 3 Mills Studios in July 2010. The crew created three giant sound stages, including Victor's cluttered family attic, a cemetery exterior, and a school interior. The sound stages were then divided into 30 separate areas to deal with the handcrafted, frame-by-frame style of filmmaking. Compared to other stop-motion animation sets, Frankenweenie's set was much larger.

As IGN noted, the main character Sparky had to be "'dog-size' compared to the other human characters, but also large enough to house all the elements of the mechanical skeleton secreted within his various foam and silicon-based incarnation". The mechanics were small and delicate, and in some instances the filmmakers had to have Swiss watchmakers create the tiny nuts and bolts. Around 200 separate puppets were used in the film, with roughly 18 different versions of Victor. The puppets had human hair, with 40–45 joints for the human characters and about 300 parts for Sparky.

=== Music ===
In early 2011, it was announced that Danny Elfman would score Frankenweenie, with work already started on pre-production music.

Prior to the film's release, both an "inspired by" soundtrack album, Frankenweenie: Unleashed!, and Elfman's Frankenweenie: The Original Motion Picture Soundtrack were released by Walt Disney Records on September 25, 2012. The download of Frankenweenie: Unleashed! contained bonus content, including a custom icon and an app that loaded a menu to view more bonus content, provide input, or buy more music from Disney Music Group.

== Release ==
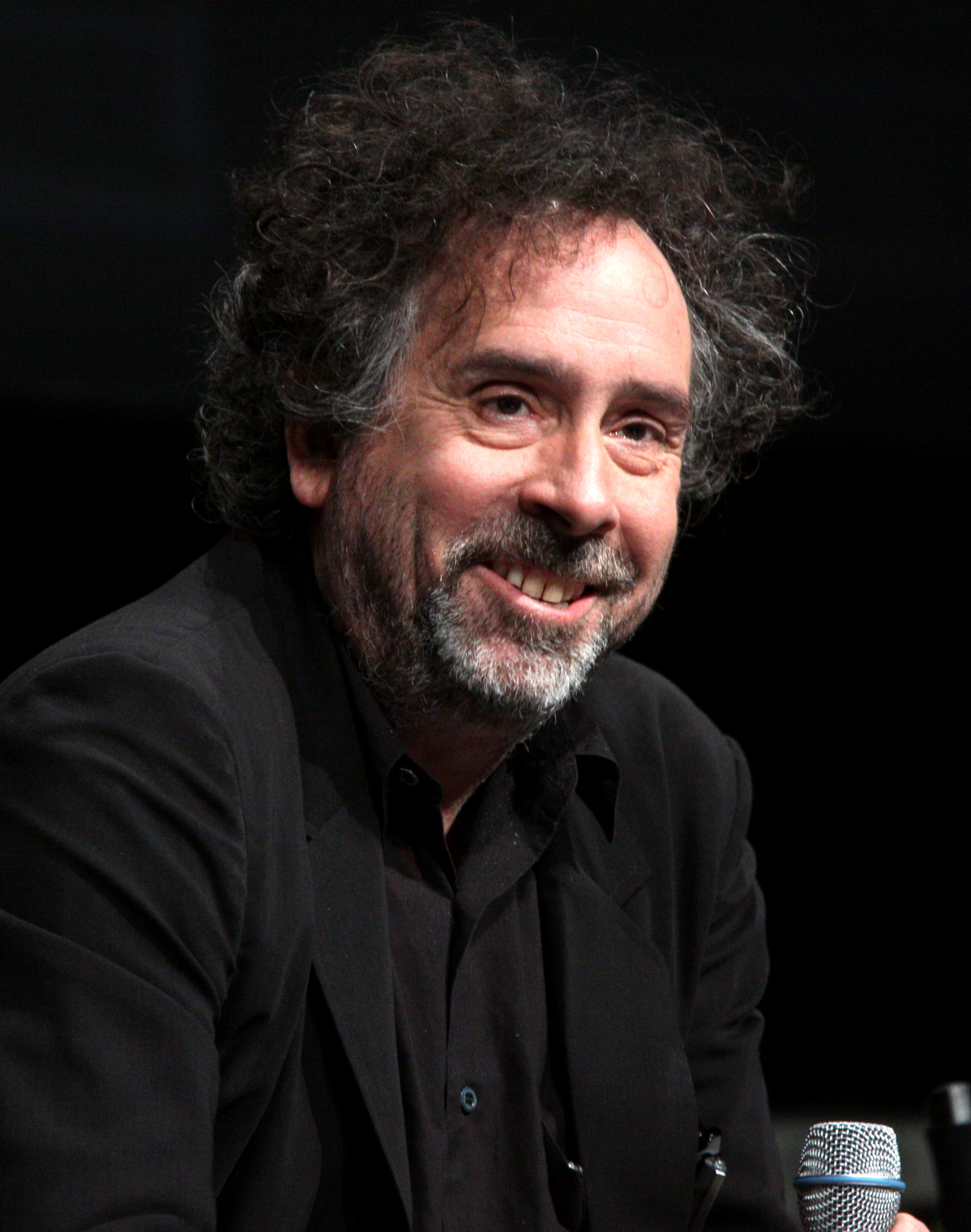
Tim Burton, the director of Frankenweenie, promoting the film at the 2012 San Diego Comic-Con

=== Marketing ===
In the lead-up to the film's release in October 2012, there was a traveling art exhibition detailing the work that went into creating the film. During the exhibition, it was possible to see sets and characters that were used for this stop motion feature film.

From September 14 to November 5, 2012, Disney California Adventure offered exclusive scenes from the film during nighttime operating hours of Muppet*Vision 3D.

At Disneyland, Sparky's tombstone was added to the pet cemetery outside of Haunted Mansion Holiday, a seasonal attraction that features characters from Burton's The Nightmare Before Christmas.

The free version of Where's My Water? received a level pack called 10 Days of Frankenweenie. It was only available for a limited time, from September 27 to October 6, 2012

Victor's mad scientist outfit and some clothes with designs inspired by the film were added to the Xbox 360 Avatar Store along with an interactable Sparky prop.

=== Premiere and theatrical release ===
The film’s world premiere took place on September 20, 2012, on the opening night of Fantastic Fest, an annual film festival in Austin, Texas. It also opened the 56th BFI London Film Festival, on October 10, 2012.

Initially set for theatrical release in November 2011, Walt Disney Studios Motion Pictures moved the film twice, first to March 9, 2012, and then, in January 2011, to October 5, 2012, with John Carter taking the March 9 release date.

=== Home media ===
The film was released by Walt Disney Studios Home Entertainment on DVD, Blu-ray, and Blu-ray 3D on January 15, 2013. The Blu-ray releases included the original live-action Frankenweenie short and a new two-minute animated short, titled Captain Sparky vs the Flying Saucers, as bonus features.

== Reception ==
=== Box office ===
Frankenweenie grossed $35,291,068 in North America and $46,200,000 in other countries for a worldwide total of $81,491,068. In North America, it earned $11,412,213 its opening weekend, finishing fifth at the box office (behind Taken 2, Hotel Transylvania, Pitch Perfect, and Looper). Its second weekend, the film dropped to seventh place, grossing an additional $7,054,334. Its third weekend, it dropped to ninth place, grossing $4,329,358, and its fourth weekend, it dropped to twelfth place, grossing $2,456,350.

=== Critical response ===
The film received generally positive reviews from critics. Based on 222 reviews, it holds an approval rating of 87% on review aggregator Rotten Tomatoes, with an average rating of 7.5/10; the website's critical consensus reads: "Frankenweenie is an energetic stop-motion horror movie spoof with lovingly crafted visuals and a heartfelt, oddball story." On Metacritic, which assigns a weighted average score out of 100 to reviews from mainstream critics, it has a score of 74, based on 38 reviews, indicating "generally favourable reviews". Audiences polled by CinemaScore gave the film an average grade of "B+" on an A+ to F scale.

Justin Chang of Variety reacted positively to the film, saying that it "evinces a level of discipline and artistic coherence missing from the director's recent live-action efforts". Todd McCarthy of The Hollywood Reporter gave it a mediocre review, explaining that, while the various creative elements "pay homage to a beloved old filmmaking style", the film mostly feels "like second-generation photocopies of things Burton has done before". Roger Ebert gave the film three out of four stars, writing that it is "not one of Burton's best, but it has zealous energy" and "the charm of a boy and his dog retains its appeal". Chris Packham of The Village Voice gave the film a positive review, saying: "Frankenweenie, scripted by John August, and based on a screenplay by Lenny Ripps from Burton's original story, is tight and brief, hitting all the marks you'd expect from an animated kid's film, and enlivened by Burton's visual style. The man should make more small movies like this one." Christy Lemire of the Associated Press gave the film three out of four stars, saying: "Revisiting the past - his own, and that of the masters who came before him - seems to have brought this filmmaker's boyish enthusiasm back to life, as well." Kerry Lengel of The Arizona Republic gave the film three out of five stars, saying: "It's all perfectly entertaining, but never really reaches the heights of hilarity, perhaps because everything about the plot is underdeveloped." Lisa Schwarzbaum of Entertainment Weekly gave the film an A−, saying: "The resulting homage to Frankenstein in particular and horror movies in general is exquisite, macabre mayhem and a kind of reanimation all its own."

Michael Phillips of the Chicago Tribune gave the film two and a half stars out of four, saying: "The monster-movie component of Frankenweenie stomps all over the appeal of the original 30-minute version." Linda Barnard of the Toronto Star gave the film three out of four stars, saying: "High-concept and stylish, Frankenweenie is a playlist of films and characters from Burton's movie-loving childhood." James Berardinelli of ReelViews gave the film three out of four stars, saying: "Even as the narrative becomes progressively more ghoulish and a Godzilla wannabe shows up, Frankenweenie never loses its heart." Joe Williams of the St. Louis Post-Dispatch gave the film three out of four stars, saying: "Some audiences might feel that Frankenweenie is creaky, but those on the same wavelength as Burton will gratefully declare it's alive." Alonso Duralde of The Wrap gave the film a positive review, saying: "Fans of Tim Burton 1.0, rejoice: Frankenweenie hearkens back to the director's salad days and, in turn, to the old-school horror classics that inspired him in the first place." Claudia Puig of USA Today gave the film three and a half stars out of five, saying: "Frankenweenie is enlivened with beguiling visuals and captivating action sequences. The science is murky at best, but the underlying themes are profound, and the story is equal parts funny and poignant. It's Burton's most moving film." Rafer Guzmán of Newsday gave the film two and a half stars out of four, saying: "It's a quintessential Burton film, but also more Disney than a lot of Disney films." Amy Biancolli of the San Francisco Chronicle gave the film four out of four stars, saying: "The overall effect is great cinema, good fun, a visual feast for pie-eyed Burton fans - and a terrifically warped reminder of just how freaky a PG film can be."

Elizabeth Weitzman of the New York Daily News gave the film four out of five stars, saying: "Burton's extraordinary powers of imagination are in dazzling bloom, from the gorgeous stop-motion animation to the goofy, homemade horror movies the children direct." Peter Travers of Rolling Stone gave the film three and a half stars out of four, saying: "Only Tim Burton could envision this Frankenstein-inspired tale, and it's a honey, a dark and dazzling spellbinder that scares up laughs and surprising emotion." Colin Covert of the Star Tribune gave the film four out of four stars, saying: "The story brims with self-parody, social satire, horror, nostalgia, wit and emotional insight, with Burton keeping all the plates spinning." David Hiltbrand of The Philadelphia Inquirer gave the film two out of four stars, saying: "Frankenweenie is the apotheosis of goth director Tim Burton's oeuvre: artistic yet sterile, incredibly meticulous and totally misbegotten." Stephanie Zacharek of NPR gave the film a negative review, saying: "Burton half succeeds in making this revamped Frankenweenie its own distinctive creature, pieced together from the essential bits of the 29-minute original. But he just doesn't know when to stop, and his overgrown creation gets the better of him." Betsy Sharkey of the Los Angeles Times gave the film three out of five stars, saying: "There are so many horror auteurs Burton wants to thank that the film is absolutely bursting at the seams with knowing nods." A. O. Scott of The New York Times gave the film three out of five stars, saying: "While Frankenweenie is fun, it is not nearly strange or original enough to join the undead, monstrous ranks of the classics it adores."

Ty Burr of The Boston Globe gave the film four out of four stars, saying: "Frankenweenie is a mere 87 minutes long, which turns out to be just the right length; there's not enough time for Burton to go off the rails as he does in so many of his films." Tom Long of The Detroit News gave the film a B+, saying: "Frankenweenie may just be a wacky horror cartoon, but it's an awfully good wacky horror cartoon. Frighteningly good, you might say." Richard Corliss of Time gave the film a positive review, saying: "This 3-D, black-and-white 'family' comedy is the year's most inventive, endearing animated feature." Stephen Whitty of the Newark Star-Ledger gave the film four out of four stars, saying: "The stop-motion animation - a favorite tool of Burton's - is given loving attention, and the character design is full of terrific touches, such as the hulking flat-topped schoolmate who looks a bit like a certain man-made monster." Michael O'Sullivan of The Washington Post gave the film three out of four stars, saying: "Designed to appeal to both discriminating adults and older kids, the gorgeous, black-and-white stop-motion film is a fresh, clever and affectionate love letter to classic horror movies." Moira Macdonald of The Seattle Times gave the film three out of four stars, saying: "Older kids, horror-movie buffs and Burton fans will likely enjoy this oddly gentle tale of a boy and his dog."

=== Awards and nominations ===
List of awards and nominations
| Award | Category | Recipient(s) | Result |
|---|---|---|---|
| 85th Academy Awards | Best Animated Feature | Tim Burton | Nominated |
| American Cinema Editors | Best Edited Animated Feature Film | Chris Lebenzon, A.C.E., & Mark Solomon | Nominated |
| Annie Awards | Best Animated Feature | | Nominated |
| Annie Awards | Production Design in an Animated Feature Production | Rick Heintzich | Nominated |
| Annie Awards | Voice Acting in an Animated Feature Production | Atticus Shaffer | Nominated |
| Annie Awards | Voice Acting in an Animated Feature Production | Catherine O'Hara | Nominated |
| Annie Awards | Writing in an Animated Feature Production | John August | Nominated |
| BAFTA Awards | Best Animated Film | Tim Burton | Nominated |
| Boston Society of Film Critics | Best Animated Film | Tim Burton | Won |
| Critics Choice Awards | Best Animated Feature | Tim Burton | Nominated |
| Chicago Film Critics Association | Best Animated Feature | Tim Burton | Nominated |
| Cinema Audio Society | Outstanding Achievement in Sound Mixing for Motion Pictures Animated | | Nominated |
| Dallas-Fort Worth Film Critics Association | Best Animated Film | Tim Burton | Nominated |
| Florida Film Critics Circle | Best Animated Feature | Tim Burton | Won |
| Golden Globe Awards | Best Animated Feature Film | Tim Burton | Nominated |
| Houston Film Critics Society | Best Animated Film | Tim Burton | Nominated |
| Kansas City Film Critics Circle | Best Animated Film | Tim Burton | Won |
| Los Angeles Film Critics Association | Best Animation | Tim Burton | Won |
| Nevada Film Critics Society | Best Animated Movie | Tim Burton | Won |
| New York Film Critics Circle | Best Animated Film | Tim Burton | Won |
| Online Film Critics Society | Best Animated Feature | Tim Burton | Nominated |
| Phoenix Film Critics Society | Best Animated Film | Tim Burton | Nominated |
| Producers Guild of America | Outstanding Animated Theatrical Motion Pictures | Allison Abbate & Tim Burton | Nominated |
| San Diego Film Critics Society | Best Animated Film | Tim Burton | Nominated |
| Satellite Awards | Best Motion Picture, Animated or Mixed Media | Tim Burton | Nominated |
| Saturn Awards | Best Animated Film | Tim Burton | Won |
| Saturn Awards | Best Music | Danny Elfman | Won |
| Southeastern Film Critics Association | Best Animated Film | Tim Burton | Nominated |
| St. Louis Gateway Film Critics Association | Best Animated Film | Tim Burton | Nominated |
| Toronto Film Critics Association | Best Animated Feature | Tim Burton | Nominated |
| Washington D.C. Area Film Critics Association | Best Animated Feature | Tim Burton | Nominated |

== See also ==
- List of films featuring Frankenstein's monster
- List of black-and-white films produced since 1966
