= Scoob! Holiday Haunt =

Unreleased American animated film

- Directed by: Michael Kurinsky; Bill Haller
- Written by: Paul Dini; Tony Cervone
- Based on: Scooby-Doo by; Joe Ruby; Ken Spears; Characters by Hanna-Barbera Productions
- Produced by: Tony Cervone; Mitchell Ferm
- Starring: Frank Welker; Iain Armitage; Ariana Greenblatt; Mckenna Grace; Pierce Gagnon; Mark Hamill; Michael McKean; Andre Braugher; Cristo Fernández; Ming-Na Wen; Maya Hawke; Patrick Warburton; Priah Ferguson; J.B. Smoove
- Music by: Dara Taylor
- Production company: Warner Animation Group
- Country: United States
- Language: English

Scoob! Holiday Haunt is an unreleased American animated mystery comedy film based on Hanna-Barbera's Scooby-Doo franchise, produced by Warner Bros. Pictures and Warner Animation Group. The film is a prequel to Scoob! (2020) and follows a young Mystery Incorporated investigating a mystery in a holiday-themed resort. The film was directed by Michael Kurinsky and Bill Haller from a screenplay by Paul Dini and Tony Cervone, and stars Frank Welker, Iain Armitage, Ariana Greenblatt, Mckenna Grace, Pierce Gagnon, Mark Hamill, Michael McKean, Andre Braugher, Cristo Fernández, Ming-Na Wen, Maya Hawke, Patrick Warburton, Priah Ferguson, and J.B. Smoove.

The film was to be released on HBO Max in December 2022. Warner Bros. Discovery shelved the film that August, citing cost-cutting measures and an intent to refocus on theatrical films over projects made for streaming.

== Premise ==
A prequel story to Scoob!; to celebrate Scooby-Doo's first Christmas, 10-year-old Shaggy and the gang take him to a holiday-themed resort owned by Fred's favorite Uncle Ned. When the park is beset by a ghostly haunting, the kids must solve a 40-year-old mystery to save the resort and show Scooby the true meaning of Christmas.

== Voice cast ==
- Frank Welker as Scooby-Doo
- Iain Armitage as Shaggy Rogers
- Ariana Greenblatt as Velma Dinkley
- Mckenna Grace as Daphne Blake
- Pierce Gagnon as Fred Jones
- Michael McKean as Uncle Ned, Fred's favorite uncle.
- Andre Braugher as Chef Dave, the resort's head chef who befriends the children.
- Patrick Warburton as Sheriff Bronson Stone

Additionally, Mark Hamill, Cristo Fernández, Ming-Na Wen, Maya Hawke, Priah Ferguson, and J.B. Smoove had been cast in undisclosed roles.

== Production ==
In June 2021, Tony Cervone said that a follow-up to Scoob! was in development. On December 22, 2021, HBO Max released a sizzle reel featuring a first look at a Christmas-themed prequel film, titled Scoob! Holiday Haunt, which was to be released on the service in December 2022. The film takes place in the gang's youth, with Welker and the actors who portrayed the younger versions reprising their roles while Cervone returned to write the film with Paul Dini as well to produce the project. The film was co-directed by Bill Haller and Michael Kurinsky.

Like Scoob!, the animation services were provided by Reel FX Animation.

== Cancellation ==
On August 2, 2022, Warner Bros. Discovery canceled its release, citing cost-cutting measures and a refocus on theatrical films rather than creating projects for streaming. Tony Cervone would go on to say on the same day that the project was "practically finished". Later that month, it was reported that the film would still be finished, even though Warner Bros. Discovery had no present plans to release it. On November 22, 2022, it was reported that production on the film had wrapped.

== See also ==
- List of abandoned and unfinished films
- List of unproduced Warner Bros. Animation projects
- Batgirl, another 2022 Warner Bros. film that was left unreleased
