= Hey Boy (Sia song) =

2020 single by Sia

Single by Sia

from the album Music – Songs from and Inspired by the Motion Picture
- Released: 19 November 2020
- Recorded: 2020
- Studio: The Ribcage (Los Angeles)
- Genre: Pop; dancehall
- Length: 2:29
- Label: Monkey Puzzle; Atlantic
- Songwriters: Sia Furler; Jesse Shatkin; Kamille
- Producer: Jesse Shatkin

Sia singles chronology
"Del Mar" (2020)	"Hey Boy" (2020)	"Floating Through Space" (2021)

Lyric video
- "Hey Boy" on YouTube

"Hey Boy" is a song by Australian singer-songwriter Sia released on 19 November 2020, through Atlantic Records. It is taken from her album, Music – Songs from and Inspired by the Motion Picture and it follows "Together" and "Courage to Change" as the third single from the album. An alternate version of the track featuring Burna Boy was released on 14 January 2021.

== Background, release and promotion ==
Sia revealed that "Hey Boy" was originally written for Rihanna.

On 12 November 2020, Sia announced the release of the single through her social media accounts and it was made available for pre-save on streaming platforms. It was released alongside its lyric video on 19 November 2020 at 13:00 UTC. With the release of the single, Sia's ninth studio album Music – Songs from and Inspired by the Motion Picture was made available for pre-order.

Sia performed "Hey Boy" live at the 2020 MTV Movie & TV Awards, on 6 December 2020.

== Composition ==
"Hey Boy" was written by Sia, Jesse Shatkin and Kamille and has a length of 2:29. Derrick Rossignol of Uproxx described it as "a quick dose of bouncy pop in which Sia expresses a desire for some male company." Billboard described the track as a "hip-swiveling tune", while NME's Nick Levine penned that it is a "dancehall bop with an infectious hint of grit".

== Credits and personnel ==
Credits adapted from TIDAL.

- Sia Furler – writer, vocals
- Kamille – writer
- Jesse Shatkin – writer, producer, bass, drum programmer, drums, engineer, guitar, keyboards, organ, percussion, synthesizer
- Sean Kantrowitz – guitar
- Sam Dent – engineer
- Serban Ghenea – mixer
- John Hanes – mixing engineer
- Chris Gehringer – masterer

== Charts ==
Chart performance for "Hey Boy"
Chart (2021)	Peak position
Mexico Ingles Airplay (Billboard)	28
San Marino (SMRRTV Top 50)	49

== Burna Boy version ==
"Hey Boy"

Single by Sia featuring Burna Boy

from the album Music
- Released: 14 January 2021
- Studio: The Ribcage (Los Angeles)
- Genre: Pop; dancehall
- Length: 3:01
- Label: Monkey Puzzle; Atlantic
- Songwriters: Sia Furler; Jesse Shatkin; Kamille; Damini Ogulu
- Producer: Jesse Shatkin

Burna Boy singles chronology
"20 10 20" (2020)	"Hey Boy" (2021)	"Kilometre" (2021)

Music video
- "Hey Boy (feat. Burna Boy)" on YouTube

An alternate version of "Hey Boy" featuring Nigerian artist Burna Boy was released on 14 January 2021, alongside an animated music video. It is featured on Music – Songs from and Inspired by the Motion Picture as a bonus track.

=== Composition ===
Burna Boy is credited as a songwriter on the alternate version of "Hey Boy"; it runs for a length of 3:01. On the track, Burna Boy performs background vocals and lends a rap verse.

=== Music video ===
The animated music video for "Hey Boy", directed by Rafatoon, premiered alongside the track's release on 14 January 2021. In the video, Sia, depicted as a "voluptuous" diva, is chased around by a "horny anthropomorphic wolf". Burna Boy, backup dancers and other characters also appear throughout the video as animals. Claire Shaffer of Rolling Stone noted the video took inspiration from Disney cartoons of the 1980s and 1990s, such as Red Hot Riding Hood, Who Framed Roger Rabbit and A Goofy Movie, and described it as a "vibrant and colorful concert sequence". Billboard described the video as "eye-popping" and Sia, in it, as a "21st century Jessica Rabbit".

=== Charts ===
Chart performance for "Hey Boy"
Chart (2021)	Peak position
New Zealand Hot Singles (RMNZ)	27

== Track listings ==
- Digital download and streaming
1. "Hey Boy" – 2:29
- Digital download and streaming
1. "Hey Boy" (feat. Burna Boy) – 3:01
- Digital download and streaming – The Remixes EP
1. "Hey Boy" (Country Club Martini Crew Remix) – 3:02
2. "Hey Boy" (Wideboys Remix) – 2:27
3. "Hey Boy" (Stave Remix) – 3:29
4. "Hey Boy" (feat. Burna Boy) – 3:01

== Release history ==
Region	Date	Format	Version	Label	Ref.
Various	19 November 2020	Digital download; streaming	Original	Monkey Puzzle; Atlantic	
Italy	28 December 2020	Contemporary hit radio	Original	Warner	
Various	14 January 2021	Digital download; streaming	Burna Boy	Monkey Puzzle; Atlantic	
Various	22 January 2021	Digital download; streaming	The Remixes EP	Monkey Puzzle; Atlantic	
