= 1+1 (Sia song) =

2021 single by Sia

- Banx & Ranx remix cover

Single by Sia

from the album Music – Songs from and Inspired by the Motion Picture
- Released: 13 July 2021
- Recorded: 2017–2021
- Studio: The Rib Cage (Los Angeles)
- Genre: Dance-pop; dancehall (remix)
- Length: 2:59
- Label: Monkey Puzzle; Atlantic
- Songwriters: Sia Furler; Jesse Shatkin
- Producer: Jesse Shatkin

Sia singles chronology
"Diamond Eyes" (2021)	"1+1" (2021)	"Born Yesterday" (2021)

Amir singles chronology
"Ce soir" (2021)	"1+1" (Remix) (2021)	"Rétine" (2021)

Audio videos
- "1+1" on YouTube
- "1+1 (Banx & Ranx Remix)" on YouTube
- "1+1 (feat. Yandel & Sofía Reyes) [Banx & Ranx Remix]" on YouTube

Lyric video
- "1+1 (feat. Amir) [Banx & Ranx Remix]" on YouTube

"1+1" is a song by Australian singer-songwriter Sia, taken from her ninth studio album, Music – Songs from and Inspired by the Motion Picture.

The song was used in musical film Music, co-written and directed by Sia, it was released on YouTube alongside Sia's album on February 12. In the film, it is performed by American actress and singer Kate Hudson.

Three Banx & Ranx remixes of "1+1" were then released; the first, featuring guest vocals from Israeli-French singer-songwriter Amir Haddad, was released on 13 July 2021. This was followed by a solo version on 23 July, and, on 6 August, a Spanish-language remix featuring Sofía Reyes and Yandel. Amir's remix is included on the deluxe edition of Haddad's fourth studio album, Ressources and on the French edition of Sia's ninth studio album.

== Composition ==
"1+1" is a "breezy", summery track, built on a dance-pop instrumental.

== Personnel ==
- Sia Furler – writer, vocals
- Jesse Shatkin – writer, producer, keyboards, bass, percussion, drums, synthesizer, engineer
- Sam Dent – producer, engineer

== Track listing ==
Digital download and streaming – album track

1. "1+1" – 2:29

Digital download and streaming – (feat. Amir) (Banx & Ranx Remix)

1. "1+1" (feat. Amir) (Banx & Ranx Remix) – 3:17

Digital download and streaming – (Banx & Ranx Remix)

1. "1+1" (Banx & Ranx Remix) – 3:25

Digital download and streaming – (feat. Yandel & Sofía Reyes) (Banx & Ranx Remix)

1. "1+1" (feat. Yandel & Sofía Reyes) (Banx & Ranx Remix) – 3:25

== Charts ==
Chart (2021)	Peak position
Belgium (Ultratop)	17
Canada AC (Billboard)	9
Canada CHR/Top 40 (Billboard)	43
France (SNEP)	40
New Zealand Hot Singles (RMNZ)	30
