= Maddie Ziegler =

American actress and dancer (born 2002)

- Ziegler in 2026
- Born: Madison Nicole Ziegler; September 30, 2002 (age 24); Pittsburgh, Pennsylvania, US
- Occupations: Actress; dancer
- Years active: 2010–present
- Relatives: Mackenzie Ziegler (sister)

Madison Nicole Ziegler (/ˈzɪɡlər/; born September 30, 2002) is an American actress and dancer. She appeared in Lifetime's reality show Dance Moms from 2011 at age 8 until 2016, and starred in a series of music videos by Sia, beginning with "Chandelier" and "Elastic Heart", which have in total attracted more than 6 billion views on YouTube. Ziegler has also appeared in films, television shows, concerts, advertisements and on magazine covers.

Ziegler was a judge on the 2016 season of So You Think You Can Dance: The Next Generation, toured with Sia in North America and Australia in 2016 and 2017 and has given dance tours with her sister, Mackenzie. Her 2017 memoir, The Maddie Diaries, was a New York Times Best Seller. Her film roles include Camille Le Haut in the animated film Ballerina (2016), Christina Sickleman in The Book of Henry (2017), the title role in Music (2021), Mia in The Fallout (2021), Velma in Steven Spielberg's West Side Story (2021), Lindy in Fitting In (2023) and Ruthie in My Old Ass (2024).

Ziegler was included by Time magazine on its list of the "30 most influential teens" in each year from 2015 to 2017. She was included in the 2023 Forbes 30 Under 30 list in the Hollywood & Entertainment category. Her social media presence includes an Instagram account with more than 13 million followers.

== Early life and education ==
Ziegler was born in Pittsburgh, Pennsylvania, to Melissa Ziegler-Gisoni and Kurt Ziegler, who owned a mortgage company. She is of Polish, German and Italian descent. Her parents divorced in 2011, and her mother married Greg Gisoni in 2013. Ziegler began taking ballet lessons at the age of two and joined the Abby Lee Dance Company at age four, where she trained in tap, ballet, lyrical, contemporary, acro and jazz. Ziegler has a younger sister, Mackenzie, a singer and dancer who appeared with her on Dance Moms, two older half-brothers from her father's previous marriage, and two older step-siblings from the previous marriage of her stepfather, Greg Gisoni, a vice president at Westinghouse Electric Company.

Ziegler attended Sloan Elementary School in Murrysville, near Pittsburgh, until 2013, when she left to be homeschooled. Ziegler was raised in Murrysville, but as a teenager she began to work and spend most of her time in Los Angeles.

== Career ==
=== Dance Moms and music videos ===
With Abby Lee Dance Company, Ziegler won numerous titles at regional, state and national dance competitions, including the 2014 Dancers Choice Award for Favorite Dancer 17 & Under. In 2010, she performed for Paula Abdul's reality television program Live to Dance. In 2011, eight-year-old Ziegler and her mother appeared on the first season of Lifetime's Dance Moms, a reality show about the young dancers on Abby Lee Miller's Abby Lee Dance Company Elite Competition Team and their often quarrelsome mothers. Ziegler "emerged as the preternaturally polished standout on six seasons" on the show, where she continued to appear alongside her mother and younger sister, Mackenzie, until 2016, their last season on the show. In 2013, she made guest appearances on a spin-off program, Abby's Ultimate Dance Competition. Dance Moms helped to make Ziegler "one of the most famous dancers in the entertainment world currently. ... [She inspires] other dancers to pursue their dreams with originality and grace."

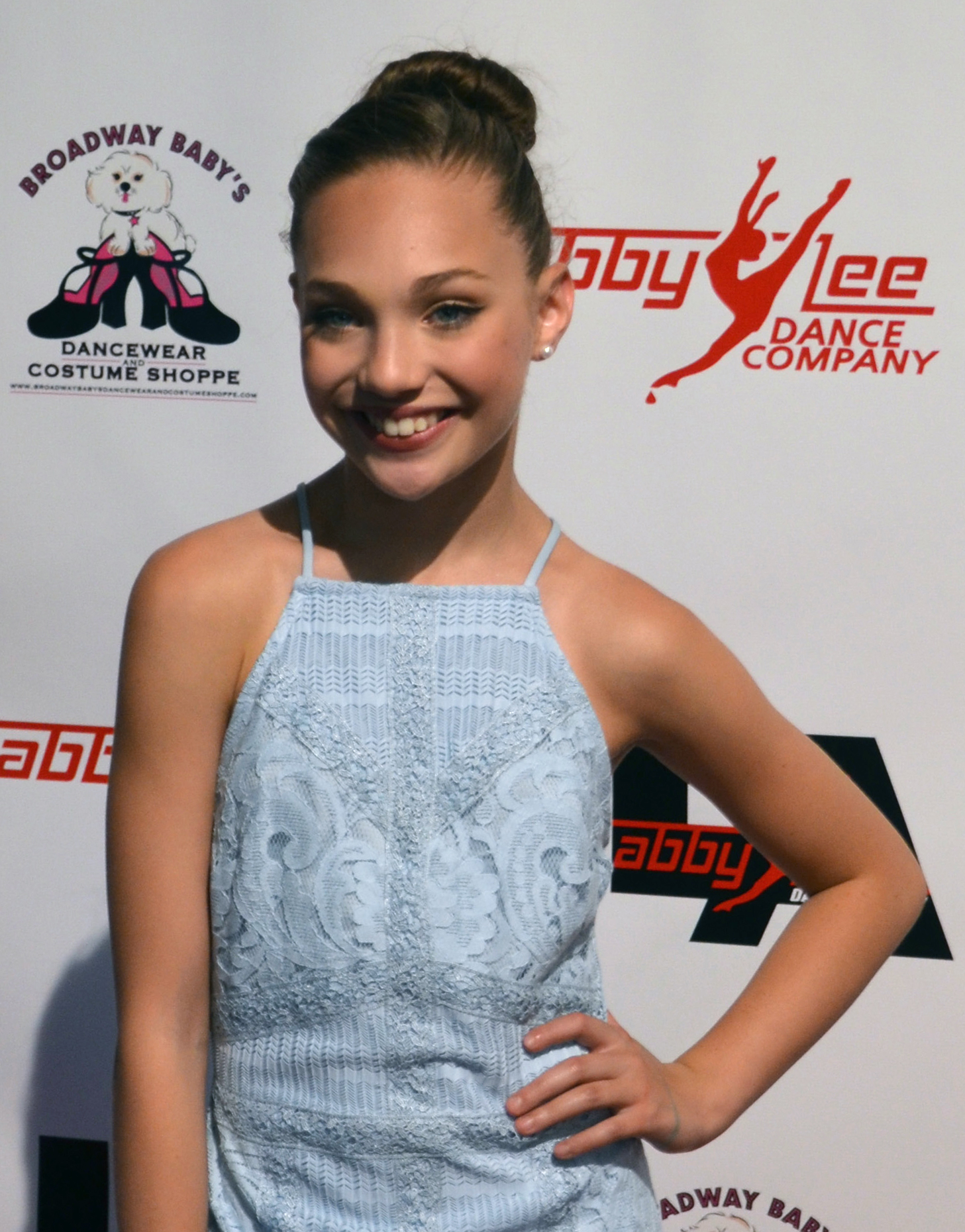
Ziegler in 2015

Ziegler has appeared in music videos for such artists as Alexx Calise, Sia and Todrick Hall. She gained wide notice, at the age of 11, by starring in the 2014 video for "Chandelier" by Sia, which won the ARIA Music Award for Best Video. Sia discovered Ziegler on Dance Moms. The video also received nominations at the 2014 MTV Video Music Awards for Video of the Year and Best Choreography, winning the latter. It was also nominated for the Grammy Award for Best Music Video in 2015. It has received more than 2.5 billion views on YouTube, and at one point it was the 13th most viewed YouTube video of all time. Ziegler said of the choreography: "It ... was really out of the box and it expanded me a lot, because I'm used to competition dances where you're like, Point your legs! But this time it was like, you just need to let go and feel it."

In 2015, Ziegler starred with Shia LaBeouf in "Elastic Heart", another Sia video, which has accumulated more than 1 billion YouTube views. Later that year, Ziegler starred in the music video for "Big Girls Cry" to complete her trilogy of videos from Sia's album 1000 Forms of Fear. She danced to Sia's vocals on several television shows in 2014 and 2015, including The Ellen DeGeneres Show, Dancing with the Stars, Jimmy Kimmel Live! and Saturday Night Live, as well as at the Hollywood Bowl. By the end of 2015, she had performed with Sia on the Ellen DeGeneres Show three times. She also performed to "Chandelier", alongside Sia and Kristen Wiig, at the 2015 Grammy Awards. The "Chandelier" and "Elastic Heart" videos were both selected as part of PopSugar's 2016 list of "25 of the Best Dance Videos of the Last Decade". In 2016, Ziegler starred in a fourth Sia video, "Cheap Thrills", from the album This Is Acting, in which she "delivers another powerful performance". This was followed by a fifth Sia video, later that year, for "The Greatest". Kathleen Hildebrand wrote in Süddeutsche Zeitung that anyone who has seen Ziegler's "iconic" movement will never again return to "boringly ordinary" MTV videos. Ziegler continued the collaboration with Sia and the group LSD in the music videos for "Thunderclouds" (2018) and "No New Friends" (2019). She also dances in the 2020 music video for Sia's single, "Together".

=== Other activities (2012–present) ===
==== Acting ====
In 2012, Ziegler's first professional acting job was portraying the character Young Deb on an episode of the Lifetime series Drop Dead Diva. In 2014, Ziegler appeared as a guest star in Episode 34 of HitStreak Summer, a made-for-mobile series. She continued her acting career in 2015 with guest spots on the Disney Channel series Austin & Ally and ABC Family's Pretty Little Liars. In January 2016, she guest starred in the episode "Ballet and the Beasts" on Nickelodeon's Nicky, Ricky, Dicky & Dawn. She returned to Nicky, Ricky, Dicky & Dawn in January 2017 in the episode "Keeping Up with the Quadashians".

Ziegler voiced the character Camille in the animated film, Ballerina (2016), released in the US in 2017 as Leap!, and played Christina in the feature film The Book of Henry (2017). Colin Trevorrow, the director of The Book of Henry, told Entertainment Weekly that Ziegler "is extraordinarily capable. ... She finds whatever emotion she needs to dial in very quickly. No one taught her how to do that she just knows." A reviewer for Santa Monica Daily Press wrote that, in The Book of Henry, "Ziegler ... does a wonderful job with a character forced to hide her pain". In 2019, she narrated a tribute film about her friend Simone Biles for BBC Sport. Ziegler co-starred as the title character in a musical film written and directed by Sia, titled Music, released in February 2021. Chris Willman, in Variety, called Ziegler's performance as a non-verbal autistic teenager "not always credible" but commented that she had "no limitations in ... dancing up a storm". Although she received the 2021 Golden Raspberry Award for Worst Supporting Actress for the role, she received several favorable reviews.

Ziegler co-stars in the high school drama film The Fallout, which premiered in March 2021 at South by Southwest, where it won the Grand Jury Prize in the Narrative Feature Film Competition. It was released on HBO Max in January 2022 and in theaters where HBO Max was not available. Ziegler's performance as the popular but lonely Mia was called "stoic yet sensitive and vulnerable", "a staggering performance" and "astounding ... fully realized and complex". She plays Velma in Steven Spielberg's version of West Side Story and stars as Lindy in the film Fitting In (initially titled Bloody Hell), written and directed by Molly McGlynn, which premiered at South by Southwest in March 2023. A review in Collider said that Ziegler's "strong performance" "elevated" the film, while The Daily Beast's thought her "natural performance leaves a lasting impression. ... Ziegler is a striking screen presence, and she brings a quiet charisma ... relatable and empathetic". Another in The Daily Texan praised her graceful and "vulnerable performance", while an article in The Globe and Mail noted "Ziegler's dry wit and vulnerability". Kurt Loder wrote that Ziegler "captures the quietly conflicted Lindy with low-key expertise. She has a way with a zippy line, too." An A.V. Club review says "Ziegler is a fantastic lead, bringing us into Lindy’s confused headspace."

Ziegler plays Ruthie in the comedy film, My Old Ass (2024), written and directed by Megan Park, who directed The Fallout. The film premiered at the Sundance Film Festival, where Variety presented Ziegler with one of its "Breakthrough Awards, which highlight the next generation of exceptional talents in front of the camera". Alex Stedman, in IGN, wrote: "Maddie Ziegler and Kerrice Brooks in particular are fantastic as Elliott’s best friends Ruthie and Ro". Later the same year she starred in a short film, Kodar: The Primordial God of Light and Ether, written by Will Ropp and Nick Skardarasy. In 2024 Ziegler filmed a starring role in the film Shiver, but post-production has been halted for financial reasons. She stars as Bones in the 2026 film Pretty Lethal, for which she was nominated for the 2026 Critics' Choice Super Award for Best Actress in an Action Movie. Later in 2026, Ziegler is set to star in In a Holidaze, based on the novel by Christina Lauren.

==== Modeling, endorsements and fashion ====
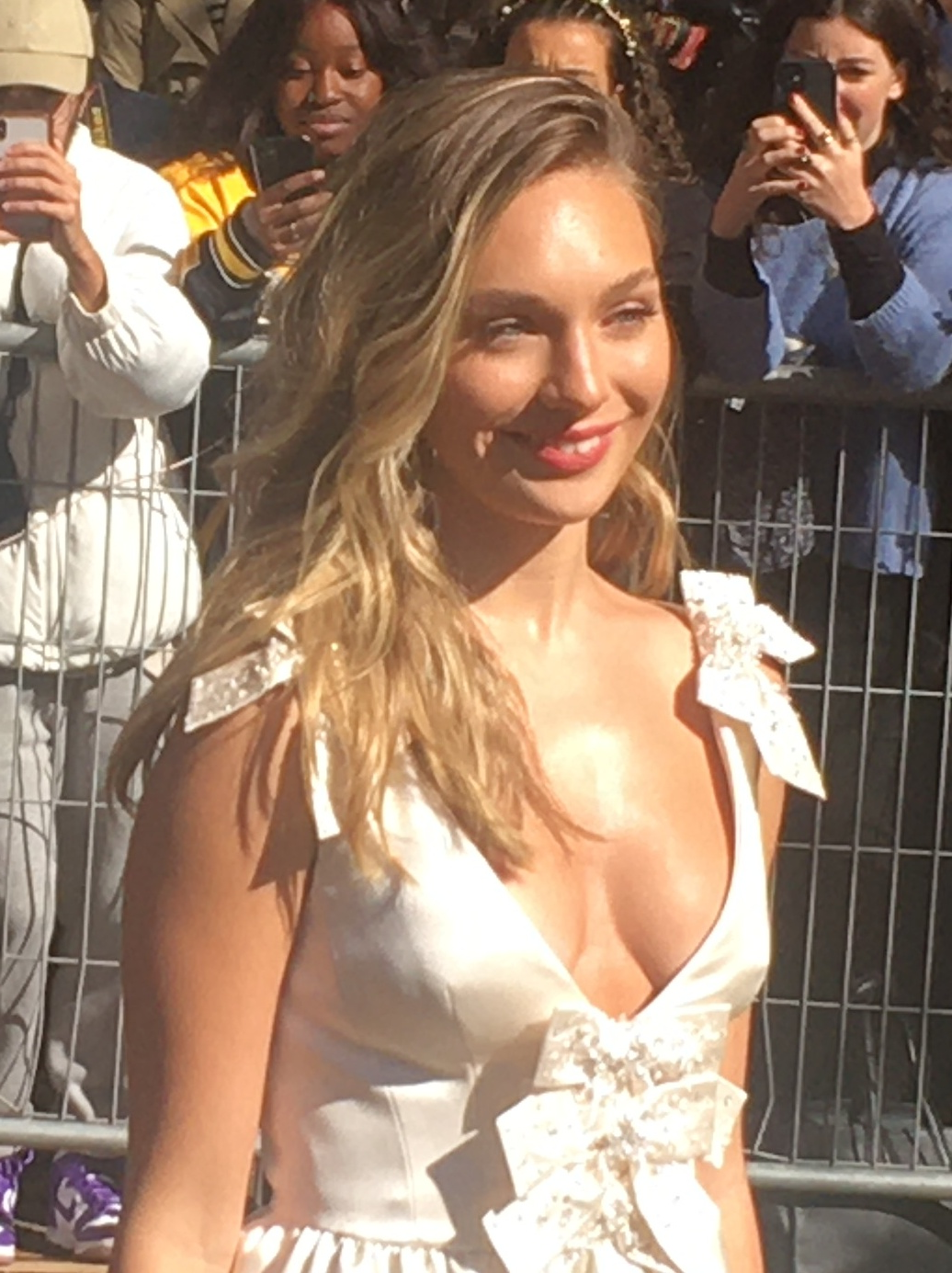
Ziegler during Paris Fashion Week in October 2021

Ziegler has modeled for, or represented, such brands as Clean & Clear, Capezio, including their Betsey Johnson line, Target, Ralph Lauren and Tiffany & Co. She has also been featured on numerous magazine covers and in fashion editorials, including Vogue, Schön!, Elle, Nylon, Vs., Seventeen, Harper's Bazaar, People, Dazed, Cosmopolitan, i-D, Billboard, Teen Vogue, Stella, Maniac, Vanity Fair Italia, Flaunt, Paper, Galore and Russh.

Ziegler and her sister released a fashion line, The Maddie & Mackenzie Collection in 2014. At the 2015 New York Fashion Week, Ziegler acted as a correspondent for Elle. She launched a casual fashion line, MaddieStyle, for girls and juniors, in 2016. In 2017, she appeared as a guest judge in an episode of Project Runway and on the cover of Sia's 2017 album Everyday is Christmas. In 2018 Ziegler collaborated with Sia on a lipstick, VIVA GLAM Sia, to benefit the M.A.C. AIDS Fund. Ziegler has a make-up collaboration with Morphe Cosmetics and a fashion collaboration with Fabletics. In 2020, she was the model for Kate Spade's signature fragrance advertisements. In 2023, Ziegler and her sister launched a back-to-school fashion collection with American Eagle Outfitters.

==== Dancing and dance judging ====
In February 2016, Ziegler appeared as the featured dancer in the ABC TV special The Wonderful World of Disney: Disneyland 60 during the song "Part of Your World", sung by Kelsea Ballerini and choreographed by Travis Wall. A Huffington Post reporter called the number "stunning and graceful". In April 2016, six of her pre-taped performances were projected onto the big screens during Sia's Coachella set, and Ziegler appeared live with Sia at YouTube's Brandcast event in New York City. In May 2016, Ziegler appeared on the season finale of The Voice with Sia, dancing to "Cheap Thrills". In June, she starred in another Todrick Hall video, "Taylor in Wonderland", based on Alice in Wonderland, dancing to a mash-up of Taylor Swift songs. That same month, Ziegler joined Fox's So You Think You Can Dance: The Next Generation as a judge and a guest performer; she also danced at Sia's concert at Red Rocks Amphitheatre in Colorado. In September 2016, Ziegler performed with Sia at the launch of Apple's iPhone 7 and at the iHeartRadio Music Festival.

She joined Sia on the singer's Nostalgic for the Present Tour from September to November 2016. Ten years later, a film of the concert was released in theatres featuring Ziegler's dancing. Ziegler and her sister conducted a dance workshop tour of Australia in January 2017. In March 2017, Ziegler performed at the Dubai World Cup with Sia. In September, Ziegler danced to Sia's song "Rainbow", from the soundtrack to My Little Pony: The Movie, in a costume that simulated the look of Sia's character in the film. She again performed with Sia on a mini-tour of Australasia in November and December 2017, and later in December, she and Sia returned to the Ellen show to perform Sia's song "Snowman". Ziegler and her sister conducted another dance workshop tour of Australia and New Zealand in July 2018 and in the UK in 2019. In July 2019, Ziegler performed at the Fuji Rock Festival with Sia in Japan. She and her sister were guest judges in 2020 on the Quibi dance competition show Floored.

==== Writing and social media ====
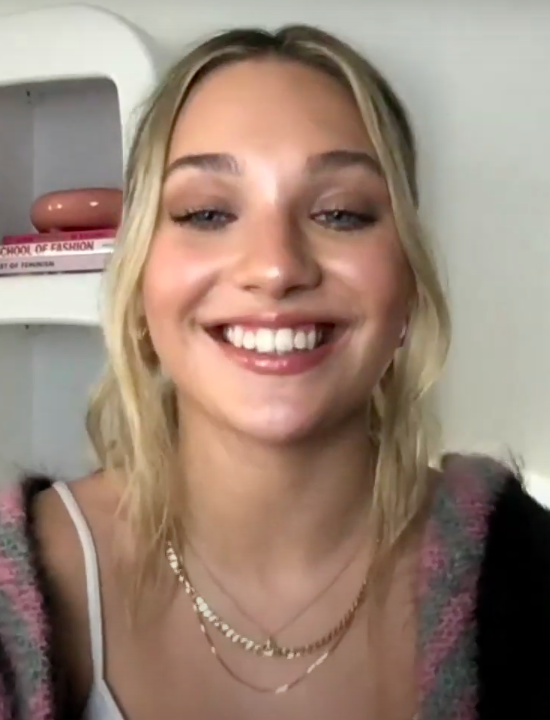
Ziegler in 2021

Ziegler wrote the foreword to Abby Lee Miller's 2014 memoir, Everything I Learned about Life, I Learned in Dance Class. Ziegler interviewed her friend Millie Bobby Brown for a cover article in the November 2016 issue of Interview magazine. In 2017, she released her own memoir, The Maddie Diaries, which became a New York Times Best Seller. Ziegler also wrote a trilogy of novels for middle-grade readers. The series centers on a 12-year-old dancer, Harper, whose family relocates to a new state, as she negotiates the pre-teen challenges of making new friends while earning her place on a competitive dance team. The first novel, The Audition, was released in 2017, The Callback was released in 2018, and The Competition followed in 2019.

Ziegler has an active social media presence, with more than 13 million Instagram followers, over 1.2 million Twitter followers and over 3 million followers on Facebook. Sia's videos of her dancing have accumulated more than six billion total views on YouTube. Ziegler's YouTube channel has more than 3.6 million subscribers.

== Philanthropy ==
In 2012, Ziegler, along with her mother and sister, partnered with Starlight Children's Foundation to help raise awareness for chronically ill youth. In 2016, Ziegler and her sister made a public service announcement for DoSomething.org's Birthday Mail campaign, which enables people to send homemade birthday cards to children living in homeless shelters. The same organization placed the Ziegler sisters on their 2016 list of charitable young celebrities. Ziegler also performed with Travis Wall at Nigel Lythgoe's Dizzy Feet Foundation gala in 2016 to raise funds for dance education programs for low-income children and scholarships for talented students at dance schools in the US

Since 2016, Ziegler has partnered with Dancers Against Cancer, appearing in public service announcements to raise awareness and funding for people battling cancer. She starred in a 2017 ASPCA Public service announcement, set to Sia's song "Puppies Are Forever", to encourage people to adopt shelter and rescue dogs. In 2018, Ziegler teamed up with Sia and MAC Cosmetics, with an ad, choreographed to Sia's song "Helium", for a lipstick with all proceeds to benefit the company's AIDS Fund. She appeared on Celebrity Family Feud on July 7, 2019, together with her sister, mother, aunt and dancer Charlize Glass, playing for "My Friend's Place", where they have volunteered in the past, which provides meals for homeless youth in Los Angeles.

== Reputation and accolades ==
Reviews called Ziegler's work in "Chandelier" "a dazzling dance performance" (Billboard magazine); commented that she "dances with such impressive flexibility" (The Guardian); thought that her "crisp moves and theatrical mugging were a great fit for Ryan Heffington's imaginative choreography" and praised her "charisma that makes this video mesmerizing: Her dancing makes your memory tingle" (Rolling Stone); and said that she "interprets the song's lyrics into something that is deranged, isolated, manic and profound" (Dazed magazine). People magazine joked that she is "a super-human graceful alien sent from Planet Talented to make us mere mortals look really clumsy". A 2015 feature in The Huffington Post praised her artistry:

Her ... jétés and pirouettes juxtapose self-containment with a sort of reckless abandon. But it is her face ... that truly captivates her audience thanks to the tantalizing allure of catharsis through art. [Ziegler's] work ethic, not to mention her evident love for the art, has made her relentlessly relevant. She has something to say with her performances, whether in a music video for Sia or in a solo at nationals. Her technique is lovely, especially for a 12-year-old. She has stretched knees, pointed feet, and arms that float on clouds, her fingers perfectly placed. But still more important is her virtuosity, her connection with the public. She tells a narrative that resonates with the viewer, whether portraying a scorned lover or a werewolf. This maturity is astounding for a preteen – she just gets it. She's meant to perform, meant to communicate with people. She has defied the odds of Generation Z's competitive, egocentric mentality to make her career about the work, not the celebrity.

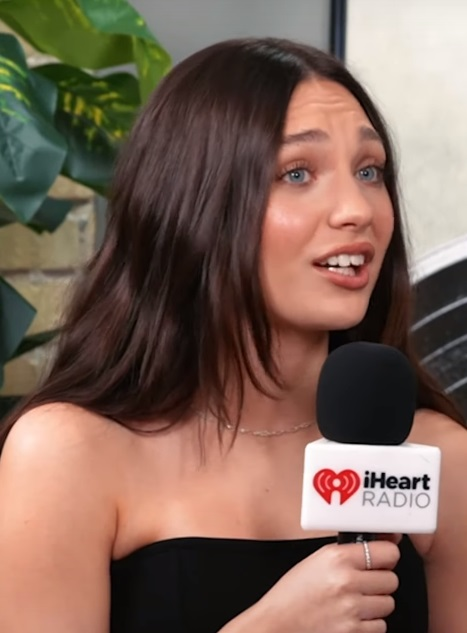
Ziegler in 2024

Ballet choreographer Troy Schumacher told New York magazine in 2016: "She has, fascinatingly, really created her own world of dance. When we talk about great dancers, it's definitely a persona that leaves a lasting impression – it's not necessarily the most technically perfect dancer. She's only 13, but there's a strong sense of personality that comes through in her movement that is somewhat iconic." Billboard's Jason Lipshutz wrote that Ziegler's live participation in Sia's Nostalgic for the Present Tour "transforms a staged affair into a live one, and a great lineup into an indispensable arena experience" and that she "possesses an astounding control of her physicality. ... [Her] presence adds a mischievous energy, as if replicated movements can't capture the heart behind those wide eyes and deranged smiles." Leslie Ventura of Las Vegas Weekly noted that, on the tour, Ziegler's dancing added "dimension and weight to the dramatic vocals." Britt Robson of the Star Tribune added, "The clear-cut star was Ziegler, obviously Sia's alter ego. ... Ziegler was a riveting whirlwind, contorting her appendages and facial expressions with equal aplomb, topped by forward flips". Jon Pareles of The New York Times wrote that her "frenetic moves and flickering expressions ramp up the songs' emotional stakes". Reviewing Sia's concert in 2017, Richard He of The Guardian called Ziegler "a physical virtuoso to match Sia's vocal acrobatics, embodying the songs' emotional turmoil." David James Young of Junkee felt that Ziegler's performance "cements her status as one of the great dancers of the modern era. ... She leaves everything out there on the stage". Bonnie Malkin of The Guardian wrote that Ziegler's "face and body are extraordinary. ... So expressive, so wild in her movement, so magnetic."

Ziegler was named by Time magazine as one of the "30 most influential teens of 2015"; she made the list again in 2016 and in 2017. She was also on the Harpers Bazaar 2015 list of "19 Rising Style Icons Aged 19 and Under". Billboard selected Sia and Ziegler's performance of "Elastic Heart" on Saturday Night Live 2015 as one of the 10 Best SNL musical performances since the 1990s, "12-year-old dance phenom Maddie Ziegler ... displayed power, vulnerability, and more than a little weirdness". Ziegler won a 2016 People's Choice Award, a 2016 Teen Choice Award and a 2017 Teen Choice Award. She won a 2017 Shorty Award in one category and received an audience honor in another. In 2018 and 2019, The Hollywood Reporter named Ziegler among Hollywood's top thirty stars under age eighteen. In 2018, for the third year in a row, Ziegler won the award for Choice Dancer at the Teen Choice Awards. She was included in the 2023 Forbes 30 Under 30 list in the Hollywood & Entertainment category.

=== Awards and nominations ===
List of accolades
Year	Award	Category	Work	Result	Ref(s)
2015	The Dance Awards	Female Best Dancer (Junior)	—N/a	3rd runner-up	
2015	Teen Choice Awards	Choice Dancer	—N/a	Nominated	
2016	People's Choice Awards	DailyMail.com; Seriously Popular Award	—N/a	Won	
2016	Shorty Awards	Best In Dance	—N/a	Nominated	
2016	Teen Choice Awards	Choice Dancer	—N/a	Won	
2017	Shorty Awards	Best In Dance	—N/a	Nominated	
2017	Shorty Awards	Medium-Length Video	"Maddie – Wear; What Moves You"	Nominated	
2017	Shorty Awards	Brand Identity	"Maddie – Wear; What Moves You"	Won	
2017	Shorty Awards	Fashion	"Maddie – Wear; What Moves You"	Audience Honor	
2017	Teen Choice Awards	Choice Dancer	—N/a	Won	
2018	Teen Choice Awards	Choice Dancer	—N/a	Won	
2019	Teen Choice Awards	Choice Female Web Star	—N/a	Nominated	
2021	Kids' Choice Awards	Favorite Female Social Star	—N/a	Nominated	
2021	Golden Raspberry Awards	Worst Supporting Actress	Music	Won	
2022	Critics' Choice Awards	Best Acting Ensemble	West Side Story	Nominated	
2024	Variety & Golden Globe's Breakthrough Artist Awards	Breakthrough Award	My Old Ass	Honoree	
2024	Northern Ontario Music and Film Awards	Outstanding Performance by an Actor	Fitting In	Won	
2026	Critics' Choice Super Awards	Best Actress in an Action Movie	Pretty Lethal	Nominated	

== Personal life ==
From early 2017 to mid-2018, Ziegler dated Australian Jack Kelly, the son of former New York Yankees infielder Pat Kelly. From 2019 to early 2023 she dated singer-songwriter Eddie Benjamin.

== Filmography ==
=== Film ===
Key
†	Denotes films that have not yet been released

Year	Title	Role	Notes	Ref(s)
2015	Lucky Thirteen	Girl	Short film	
2016	Ballerina	Camille	Voice role. Animated film	
2017	The Book of Henry	Christina Sickleman	Live action feature film debut	
2020	To All the Boys: P.S. I Still Love You	Cheerleader	Cameo	
2021	Music	Music Gamble		
2021	The Fallout	Mia Reed		
2021	West Side Story	Velma		
2023	Fitting In	Lindy		
2024	My Old Ass	Ruthie		
2024	Kodar: The Primordial God of Light and Ether	Claire	Short film	
2026	Pretty Lethal	Bones		
2026	Sia: Nostalgic for the Present	Lead dancer	Concert performance film	
2026	In a Holidaze †	Maelyn Jones		
TBA	Girl †	TBA	Post-production	

=== Television ===
Key
•	Denotes acting credits

Year	Title	Role	Network	Notes	Ref.
2011–2016	Dance Moms	Herself	Lifetime	Main cast, 162 episodes	
2012–2015	The View	Herself, dancer	ABC	3 episodes	
2012	Drop Dead Diva •	Young Deb	Lifetime	Episode: "Lady Parts"	
2013	Abby's Ultimate Dance Competition	Herself	Lifetime	2 episodes	
2014–2019	The Ellen DeGeneres Show	Herself, dancer	NBCUniversal	6 episodes (5 with Sia)	
2014–2015	Dancing with the Stars	Performer	ABC	Sia: "Chandelier", with Allison Holker (Season 19, Ep. 4); Josh Groban: "Somewhere Over the Rainbow" (Season 20, Ep. 9)	
2014	Jimmy Kimmel Live!	Herself, dancer	ABC	Sia: "Chandelier"; Ziegler teaches hosts "Chandelier" dance (Season 12, Ep. 95)	
2015	Saturday Night Live	Performer	NBC	Sia: "Elastic Heart" (Season 40, Ep. 11)	
2015	57th Annual Grammy Awards	Performer	CBS	Sia: "Chandelier" with Kristen Wiig	
2015	Austin & Ally •	Shelby Hayden	Disney Channel	Episode: "Homework and Hidden Talents"	
2015	Pretty Little Liars •	Creepy Dancer	ABC Family	Episode: "She's No Angel"	
2016–2017	Nicky, Ricky, Dicky & Dawn •	Eiffel	Nickelodeon	2 episodes	
2016–2017	Harry	Herself	NBCUniversal Television Distribution	2 episodes	
2016	The Wonderful World of Disney: Disneyland 60	Performer	ABC	Kelsea Ballerini: "Part of Your World"	
2016	The Voice	Performer	NBC	Sia: "Cheap Thrills" (Season 10 finale)	
2016	So You Think You Can Dance: The Next Generation	Judge and guest dancer	Fox	10 episodes, including 8 as a judge and 2 as a guest dancer	
2017	Project Runway	Guest judge	Lifetime	August 31 episode	
2018	Hollywood Medium with Tyler Henry	Herself	E! Television Network	April 18 episode	
2018	Dancing with the Stars	Herself, dancer	ABC	October 15 episode – tango with Alexis Ren and Alan Bersten	
2018	Dancing with the Stars: Juniors	Herself, dancer	ABC	November 18 episode – samba with her sister and Sage Rosen	
2019	Spirit Riding Free •	Rose	Netflix	Voice role	
2019	The Tonight Show	Herself	NBC	Interview	
2019	Celebrity Family Feud	Herself	ABC	Charity contestant	
2020	Scooby-Doo and Guess Who?	Herself	Boomerang	Episode: "Dance Matron of Mayhem" (voice)	
2020	The Tonight Show	Herself, dancer	NBC	Sia: "Together"	

=== Music videos ===
Year	Title	Artist	Notes	Ref.
2011	"It's Like Summer"	LUX	Supporting	
2012	"Cry"	Alexx Calise	Lead	
2012	"Summer Love Song"	Brooke Hyland	Supporting	
2014	"It's a Girl Party"	Mack Z		
2014	"Freaks Like Me"	Todrick Hall	Supporting, vocals	
2014	"Chandelier"	Sia	Lead	
2014	"Shine"	Mack Z	Supporting	
2015	"Elastic Heart"	Sia	Lead, alongside Shia LaBeouf	
2015	"Big Girls Cry"	Sia	Lead	
2015	"Wear Em Out"	Kendall K	Assistant choreographer	
2016	"Cheap Thrills"	Sia	Lead, alongside two male dancers	
2016	"Taylor in Wonderland"	Todrick Hall	Lead	
2016	"The Greatest"	Sia	Lead	
2017	"Outlaws"; Music: "Feel It Still"	Portugal. The Man	Co-lead with 5 other dancers Brian Friedman, choreographer	
2017	"Rainbow"	Sia	Lead	
2018	"Thunderclouds"	LSD	Co-lead with Diplo and Labrinth	
2019	"Bitch (Takes One to Know One)"	Lennon Stella	Cameo	
2019	"No New Friends"	LSD	Co-lead with Diplo and Labrinth	
2019	"Graduation"	Benny Blanco and Juice Wrld	Cameo ("Kristen")	
2020	"Worse"	New Hope Club	Supporting	
2020	"Together"	Sia	Lead, alongside Kate Hudson and Leslie Odom Jr.	
2021	"Speechless"	Eddie Benjamin	Lead, alongside Eddie Benjamin	
2023	"Anatomy"	Mackenzie Ziegler	Choreographer	

== Tours ==
- Nostalgic for the Present Tour with Sia (2016–17)
- The Ziegler Girls 2017 tour of Australia (with Mackenzie Ziegler)
- Maddie & Mackenzie Australia & New Zealand Tour 2018 (with Mackenzie Ziegler)
- Maddie and Mackenzie UK tour

== See also ==
- List of dancers
