= Floating Through Space =

2021 single by Sia and David Guetta

Single by Sia and David Guetta

from the album Music – Songs from and Inspired by the Motion Picture
- Released: 19 February 2021
- Genre: Dance-pop
- Label: Monkey Puzzle; Atlantic
- Songwriters: Sia Furler; Greg Kurstin
- Producers: Greg Kurstin; David Guetta; Mike Hawkins; Toby Green

Sia singles chronology
"Hey Boy" (2020)	"Floating Through Space" (2021)	"Titans" (2021)

David Guetta singles chronology
"Big" (2021)	"Floating Through Space" (2021)	"Bed" (2021)

Music video
- "Floating Through Space" on YouTube

"Floating Through Space" is a song by Australian singer-songwriter Sia and French DJ David Guetta. It was released on 4 February 2021 by Monkey Puzzle and Atlantic Records as the first promotional single from Sia's ninth studio album Music – Songs from and Inspired by the Motion Picture, and was later released as the fourth and last single from the album.

== Background and release ==
Sia announced the release of "Floating Through Space" on 3 February 2021, the day before it was released. Originally released as a promotional single, it was serviced to contemporary hit radio in Italy on 19 February 2021. It is Sia's seventh song with Guetta to be released as an official single, following "Titanium", "She Wolf (Falling to Pieces)", "Bang My Head", "Helium", "Flames" and "Let's Love", and tenth collaboration overall.

== Composition ==
Written by Sia and frequent collaborator Greg Kurstin, "Floating Through Space" is a dance-pop song which features electric, upbeat synths. It has an uplifting atmosphere and inspiring, simple lyrics; "You made it through another day" is repeated throughout the track. The song bears more resemblance to Sia's style of pop music more than her previous collaborations with David Guetta.

== Music video ==
=== Standard ===
A music video, directed by Lior Molcho, was released alongside the song on 4 February 2021. In the video, three skateboaders, each wearing one of Sia's signature black-and-white wigs, obscuring their eyes, show off their moves at a skatepark.

==== Credits ====
Music video credits adapted from YouTube.

- Lior Molcho – director
- Danit Sigler – cinematographer, editor
- Chen Biton – producer
- Stephanie Sosa – line producer
- Deven MacNair – stunt coordinator
- Tali Litmanovitz – second camera
- Janthavy Norton – skateboarder
- Cory Mcmillin – skateboarder
- Bryan McGowan – skateboarder

=== Collaboration with NASA ===
In April 2021, Sia collaborated with NASA for a music video of the track celebrating the first flight of the Ingenuity Mars helicopter. The video features footage of NASA researchers and engineers working and testing the helicopter, as well as the Perseverance mission, and includes facts explaining what is happening.

== Credits and personnel ==
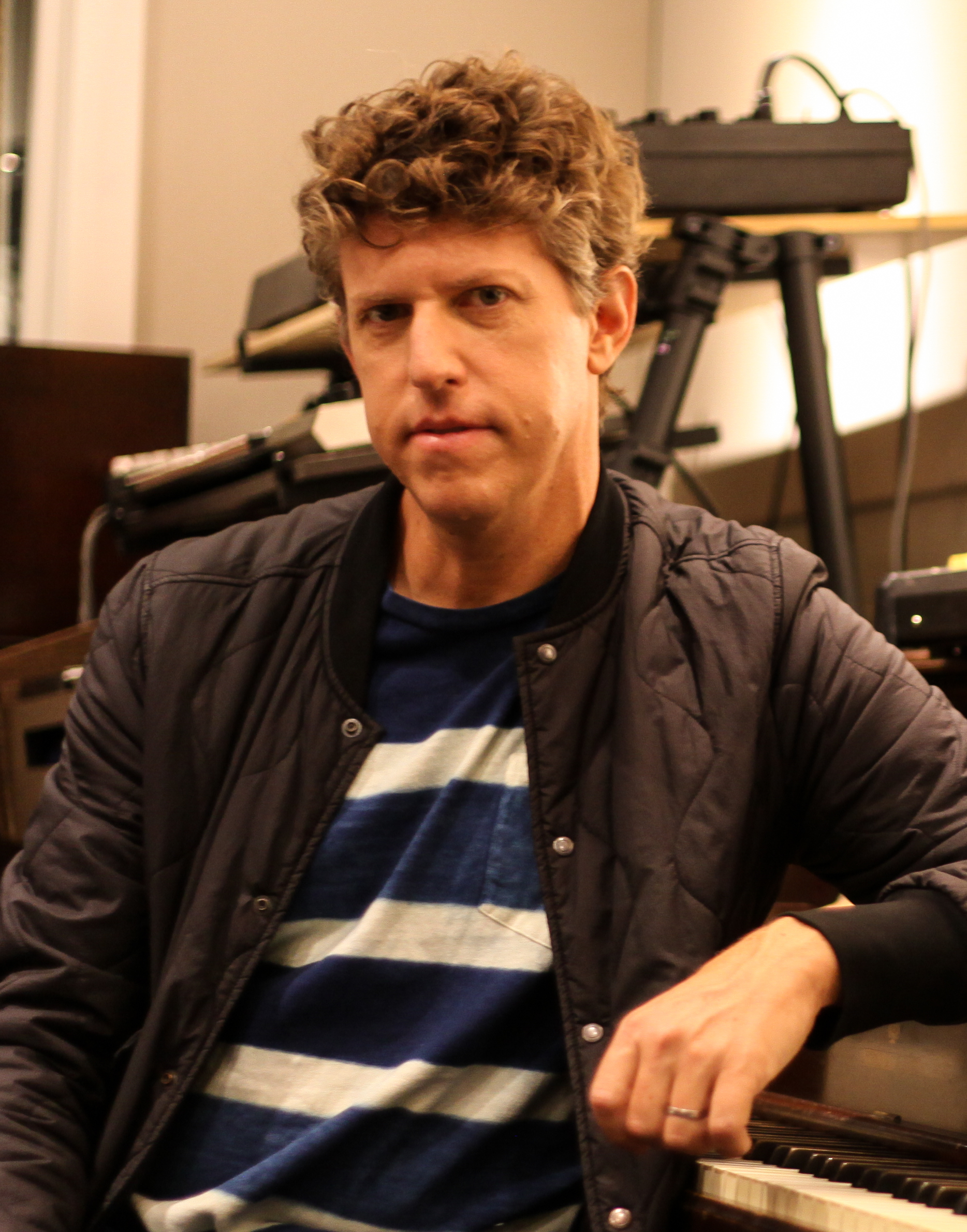
Greg Kurstin, co-writer and producer on the song.

Credits adapted from Tidal and liner notes of Music.

- Sia Furler – writer, vocals
- Greg Kurstin – writer, producer, keyboards, engineer
- David Guetta – producer, mixer
- Mike Hawkins – producer
- Toby Green – producer
- Julian Burg – engineer

== Charts ==
=== Weekly charts ===
Weekly chart performance for "Floating Through Space"
Chart (2021)	Peak position
Austria (Ö3 Austria Top 40)	51
Belgium (Ultratop 50 Wallonia)	19
Croatia (HRT)	4
Czech Republic Airplay (ČNS IFPI)	22
Czech Republic Singles Digital (ČNS IFPI)	89
Finland Airplay (Radiosoittolista)	18
France (SNEP)	50
Germany (GfK)	56
Global Excl. U.S. (Billboard)	162
Hungary (Rádiós Top 40)	39
Lithuania (AGATA)	94
Netherlands (Dutch Top 40)	8
Netherlands (Single Top 100)	18
New Zealand Hot Singles (RMNZ)	21
Norway (VG-lista)	33
Poland (Polish Airplay Top 100)	78
San Marino (SMRRTV Top 50)	42
Slovakia Airplay (ČNS IFPI)	6
Slovakia (Singles Digitál Top 100)	39
Sweden (Sverigetopplistan)	55
Switzerland (Schweizer Hitparade)	32
US Hot Dance/Electronic Songs (Billboard)	11

=== Year-end charts ===
Year-end chart performance for "Floating Through Space"
Chart (2021)	Position
Belgium (Ultratop Wallonia)	67
France (SNEP)	116
Netherlands (Dutch Top 40)	26
Netherlands (Single Top 100)	70
Switzerland (Schweizer Hitparade)	62
US Hot Dance/Electronic Songs (Billboard)	55

== Certifications ==
Region	Certification	Certified units/sales
Austria (IFPI Austria)	Gold	15,000^{‡}
France (SNEP)	Platinum	200,000^{‡}
^{‡} Sales+streaming figures based on certification alone.

== Release history ==
Release history for "Floating Through Space"
Region	Date	Format	Version	Label	Ref.
Various	4 February 2021 (Note: Release as a promotional single.)	Digital download; streaming	Original	Monkey Puzzle; Atlantic	
Italy	19 February 2021	Contemporary hit radio	Original	Warner	
Various	19 March 2021	Digital download; streaming	Hex Hector's Roller Jam Mix	Monkey Puzzle; Atlantic	
Various	9 April 2021	Digital download; streaming	JIM OUMA Remix	Monkey Puzzle; Atlantic	
Various	30 April 2021	Digital download; streaming	Hex & Sia In Space Mix	Monkey Puzzle; Atlantic	
