= Alexx Calise =

American singer-songwriter

- Born: June 28, 1985 (age 41); Staten Island, New York, U.S.
- Origin: Fort Lauderdale, Florida, U.S.
- Genres: Rock
- Occupations: Musician; singer; songwriter
- Instruments: Vocals; guitar
- Years active: 2007–present
- Website: alexxcalise.net

Alexx Calise (born June 28, 1985), is an American singer, songwriter, and musician. She is best known for her solo work and her other musical project (with songwriting partner Dennis Morehouse), BBatfarm. Calise is best known for her 2010 song "Cry" which received heavy rotation after being featured on reality TV show Dance Moms the following year.

== Biography ==
Alexx Calise was born on June 28, 1985, in Staten Island, New York, but grew up in Fort Lauderdale, Florida. An avid writer, she began playing the guitar at age 11 to emulate her father, who is also a musician. Calise began pursuing her professional music career at the age of 14.

She now resides in Los Angeles, California, where she writes and performs her own solo material, and pens songs for other high-profile artists. Calise's original music has appeared in several television shows such as Dance Moms, Dance Moms: Miami, Abby's Ultimate Dance Competition, Grimm, NY Ink, Last Call with Carson Daly, One Tree Hill, Next, Tough Love, CrossFit Games and more. Her song, "Release Me" was also chosen as the title track for the 2011 film, L.A., I Hate You, starring William Forsythe, Malcolm McDowell and Deedee Pfieffer, which was distributed by Universal Pictures. She also lent her voice to a Coachella Music Festival short (music written by Matt O'Malley of human) directed by Sam O'Hare.

Calise is best known for her song, "Cry", a ballad which she wrote in fifteen minutes in her apartment during a low point in her life that was released in 2010 as a track on her second studio album In Avanti, the song was featured on Lifetime's Dance Moms in 2011, where it enjoyed heavy rotation and has gone on to sell hundreds of thousands of units independently. "Cry" peaked at No. 64 on the iTunes rock charts in August 2011, and its official music video also features Dance Moms star, Maddie Ziegler, who danced to the song in several episodes of the show.

Calise is also an actress, and has appeared in several national TV commercials and shows including the Discovery Channel documentary, The Science of Sex Appeal, Disney's Science of Imagineering DVD series, and most recently, a series of national Guitar Center commercials.

Calise and her band performed her song "Cry" on season 7 of Dance Moms with Nia Sioux and Kendall Vertes. Calise also released her single, "Breathe," which featured Nia Sioux on vocals on the same day as the episode's airing.

Calise is currently working on new music for her solo project and her band Batfarm, as well as hosting for Guitar World magazine and writing for a variety of music publications.

== Interviews ==
Calise has been interviewed by The Wall Street Journal, Examiner.com, Guitar Player, Blender, Guitar World, Louis Velazquez of UCW Radio, Outloud Multimedia, Hard Drivin' Radio, Paul and Young Ron of Big 106 FM, Empowerment4women.com, Broward New Times, Sun-Sentinel, Miami Community News, and more. She was also interviewed in the nationally distributed how-to/method book, How to Succeed as a Female Musician (Alfred Publishing), which features such notable musicians as Lisa Loeb and the Donnas), and more.

== Charity work ==
Calise is involved with Wear Your Music, an organization that produces jewelry from high-profile artists' guitar strings. All sales from Calise's bracelets are donated to the Brain Trauma Foundation.

== Discography ==
- "Pull It (Bullet)" (single) (2007)
- "Morning Pill" (2007)
- "In Avanti" (2010)
- "No Vampires In Gilroy" (2011) (with other group, Sound of Cancer—now Batfarm)
- "Outta Here Alive" (single) (2012)
- "AC3" EP (2012)
- "Home Again" (single) (2013)
- "All Night Long" (single) (2013)
- "The Catalyst: B-Sides" (2015)
- "Addition by Subtraction" (2015)
- "Breathe" (single) (2017)
- "Rise" feat. Sensitive Robot (single) (2019)
