= In a Holidaze =

Upcoming Christmas film

- Release poster
- Directed by: Tiffany Paulsen
- Screenplay by: Tiffany Paulsen
- Based on: In a Holidaze by Christina Lauren
- Produced by: Leslie Morgenstein; Elysa Koplovitz Dutton
- Starring: Maddie Ziegler; Rob Lowe; Graham Phillips; Elias Kacavas
- Production company: Alloy Entertainment
- Distributed by: Netflix
- Release date: December 2, 2026
- Country: United States
- Language: English

In a Holidaze is an upcoming Netflix time-loop comedy set at Christmas. It is written and directed by Tiffany Paulsen and stars Maddie Ziegler and Rob Lowe. The film is based on the 2020 novel by Christina Lauren.

== Premise ==
An unlucky-in-love young woman finds herself caught in a time-loop of family Christmas gatherings until she discovers the key to her own happiness.

== Cast ==
- Maddie Ziegler
- Rob Lowe
- Graham Phillips
- Elias Kacavas
- Patton Oswalt
- Jackie Sandler
- Gil Bellows
- Andrea Anders
- Luke Roessler

== Production ==
The film is written and directed by Tiffany Paulsen and produced by Alloy Entertainment for Netflix. It is adapted from the 2020 novel by Christina Lauren, the pen name for writing partners Christina Hobbs and Lauren Billings, and was first announced in development in 2024.

It is produced by Leslie Morgenstein and Elysa Koplovitz Dutton. The cast is led by Maddie Ziegler, Rob Lowe, Graham Phillips and Elias Kacavas. In March 2026, Patton Oswalt, Jackie Sandler, Gil Bellows, Andrea Anders and Luke Roessler were confirmed in the cast.

Principal photography was scheduled for Vancouver and Whistler, British Columbia, with Vancouver filming dates commencing from 29 January 2026 and running to 12 March 2026.

== Release ==
In a Holidaze is scheduled to be released on Netflix on December 2, 2026.
