= Jesse Shatkin =

American songwriter

- Also known as: Belief (1999–2010)
- Born: Jesse Samuel Shatkin; 1979 (age 46–47)
- Genres: Pop; rock; alternative rock; hip hop
- Occupations: Record producer; songwriter; engineer
- Instruments: Keyboards; bass; guitar; drums
- Years active: 2002–present

Jesse Samuel Shatkin (born 1979) is an American songwriter, producer and engineer. He has worked with Sia, Kelly Clarkson, Jennifer Lopez, Fitz and the Tantrums, One Direction, and Miley Cyrus, among others. Shatkin was nominated in 2014 for Grammy Awards as both a producer (Record of the Year) and as a songwriter (Song of the Year). Both nominations were based on his work on the Sia track "Chandelier", which he co-wrote and co-produced. He was also nominated in the Record of the Year category in 2013 as an engineer on Clarkson's single "Stronger (What Doesn't Kill You)".

Shatkin works frequently with producer Greg Kurstin. As an engineer, his credits include records by artists including Jennifer Lopez, Selena Gomez, Ellie Goulding, Pink, Rita Ora, The Shins, Lily Allen, Tegan and Sara and Dido, among others.

== Songwriting and production credits ==
| Year | Title | Artist(s) | Album | Credits | Written with | Produced with |
|---|---|---|---|---|---|---|
| 2014 | "Kiss Me Once" | Kylie Minogue | Kiss Me Once | Producer | - | - |
| 2014 | "Chandelier" | Sia | 1000 Forms of Fear | Co-writer/Producer | Sia Furler | Greg Kurstin |
| 2014 | "Godzillionaire" | Brooke Candy | Opulence EP | Co-writer/Producer | Brooke Candy, Sia Furler, Jimmy Joliff, Maureen McDonald, Cory Enemy, Jesse St. John | - |
| 2014 | "Adiós" | Ricky Martin | A Quien Quiera Escuchar | Producer | - | Antonio Rayo, Yotuel Romero, David Cabrera, Enrique Larreal |
| 2014 | "Waiting for Lightning" | Cheryl | Only Human | Co-writer/Producer | Fransisca Hall, Matthew Morris | - |
| 2015 | "Invincible" | Kelly Clarkson | Piece by Piece | Co-writer/Producer | Sia Furler, Stephen Mostyn, Warren "Oak" Felder | Steve Mostyn, Oak |
| 2015 | "Take You High" | Kelly Clarkson | Piece by Piece | Co-writer/Producer | Maureen McDonald | - |
| 2015 | "In the Blue" | Kelly Clarkson | Piece by Piece | Co-writer/Producer | Kelly Clarkson, Anjulie Persaud, Fransisca Hall | - |
| 2015 | "Okay Dog" | Murs | Have a Nice Life | Co-writer/Producer | Nicholas Carter, J Taylor | - |
| 2015 | "Get It" | Matt & Kim | New Glow | Co-writer/Producer | Matthew Johnson, Kimberly Schifino | Matt Johnson |
| 2015 | "No More Control" (featuring MNDR) | Murs | Have a Nice Life | Co-writer/Producer | Nicholas Carter, Amanada Lucille Warner | - |
| 2015 | "Mi Corazon" | Murs | Have a Nice Life | Co-writer/Producer | Nicholas Carter, Amanada Lucille Warner | - |
| 2015 | "Woke Up Dead" | Murs | Have a Nice Life | Co-writer/Producer | Nicholas Carter | - |
| 2015 | "Pussy and Pizza" | Murs | Have a Nice Life | Co-writer/Producer | Nicholas Carter | - |
| 2015 | "Two Step" (featuring King Fantastic) | Murs | Have a Nice Life | Co-writer/Producer | Nicholas Carter | - |
| 2015 | "Anyways" | Murs | Have a Nice Life | Co-writer/Producer | Nicholas Carter | - |
| 2015 | "I Miss Mikey" | Murs | Have a Nice Life | Co-writer/Producer | Nicholas Carter | - |
| 2015 | "Heart Is a Weapon" | Walk off the Earth | Sing It All Away | Co-writer | Sarah Blackwood, Giancarlo Nicassio, Ryan Marshall, Thomas Salter | - |
| 2015 | "In The Cards" | Robert DeLong | In the Cards | Producer | - | Robert DeLong |
| 2015 | "Crystal Heart" | Jasmine Thompson | Adore EP | Co-writer/Producer | Jasmine Thompson, Fransisca Hall | - |
| 2015 | "Alive" | Sia | This Is Acting | Producer | - | - |
| 2015 | "Perfect" | One Direction | Made in the A.M. | Co-writer/Producer | Harry Styles, Louis Tomlinson, Julian Bunetta, John Ryan, Jacob Kasher Hindlin, Maureen McDonald | Julian Bunetta, Afterhrs |
| 2015 | "Feet Don't Fail Me Now" | Foxes | All I Need | Co-writer/Producer | Louise Allen, Fransisca Hall | - |
| 2015 | "One Million Bullets" | Sia | This Is Acting | Co-writer/Producer | Sia Furler | - |
| 2016 | "Reaper" | Sia | This Is Acting | Producer | - | Kanye West, Dom $olo, Noah Goldstein, 88-Keys, Jake Sinclair |
| 2016 | "Unstoppable" | Sia | This Is Acting | Producer | - | - |
| 2016 | "House on Fire" | Sia | This Is Acting | Producer | - | Jack Antonoff, Jake Sinclair |
| 2016 | "Footprints" | Sia | This Is Acting | Additional producer | - | T-Minus, Josh Valle, Nikhil Seetharam |
| 2016 | "Broken Glass" | Sia | This Is Acting | Co-writer/Producer | Sia Furler, Jasper Leak | - |
| 2016 | "Fist Fighting a Sandstorm" | Sia | This Is Acting | Co-writer/Producer | Sia Furler | - |
| 2016 | "Summer Rain" | Sia | This Is Acting | Co-writer/Producer | Sia Furler | - |
| 2016 | "Up All Night" | Charlie Puth | Nine Track Mind | Co-writer | - | Matt Prime |
| 2016 | "On My Way" | Foxes | All I Need | Co-writer | Louisa Allen | - |
| 2016 | "100x" | Tegan and Sara | Love You to Death | Co-writer | Tegan Quinn, Sara Quinn | - |
| 2016 | "Dying to Know" | Tegan and Sara | Love You to Death | Co-writer | Tegan Quinn, Sara Quinn, Greg Kurstin | - |
| 2016 | "Complicated" | Fitz and the Tantrums | Fitz and the Tantrums | Co-writer/Producer | Michael Fitzpatrick, Noelle Scaggs, Joe Kearns, James King, Jeremy Ruzumma, Jonathan Wicks, Sean Foreman | - |
| 2016 | "Burn it Down" | Fitz and the Tantrums | Fitz and the Tantrums | Producer | - | - |
| 2016 | "Roll Up" | Fitz and the Tantrums | Fitz and the Tantrums | Producer | - | - |
| 2016 | "Tricky" | Fitz and the Tantrums | Fitz and the Tantrums | Co-writer/Producer | Michael Fitzpatrick, Noelle Scaggs, Joe Kearns, James King, Jeremy Ruzumma, Jonathan Wicks, Ross Golan | - |
| 2016 | "Run It" | Fitz and the Tantrums | Fitz and the Tantrums | Producer | - | - |
| 2016 | "Get Right Back" | Fitz and the Tantrums | Fitz and the Tantrums | Producer | - | - |
| 2016 | "Walking Target" | Fitz and the Tantrums | Fitz and the Tantrums | Producer | - | - |
| 2016 | "A Place for Us" | Fitz and the Tantrums | Fitz and the Tantrums | Producer | - | - |
| 2016 | "Sledgehammer" | Rihanna | Star Trek Beyond: OST | Co-writer/Producer | Sia Furler, Robyn Fenty | - |
| 2016 | "Phone" | Lizzo | Coconut Oil EP | Co-writer/Producer | Melissa Jefferson, Evan Kidd Bogart | Ricky Reed |
| 2016 | "Lavender" | Two Door Cinema Club | Gameshow | Co-writer | Alexander Trimble, Kevin Baird, Samuel Halliday, Jacknife Lee, Sean Foreman | - |
| 2017 | "Young and Menace" | Fall Out Boy | Mania | Producer | - | Fall Out Boy |
| 2017 | "Believer" | Lea Michele | Places | Co-writer/Producer | Fransisca Hall, Anjulie Persaud | - |
| 2017 | "Let You Go" | Machine Gun Kelly | Bloom | Co-writer/Producer | Colson Baker, Brandon Allen, Samuel Basil | Machine Gun Kelly, slimXX, Baze |
| 2017 | "Good Goodbye" (featuring Pusha T & Stormzy) | Linkin Park | One More Light | Co-writer/Additional producer | Brad Delson, Michael Shinoda, Terrence Thornton, Michael Omari | Mike Shinoda, Brad Delson, Andrew Bolooki |
| 2017 | "Invisible" | Linkin Park | One More Light | Co-producer | - | Brad Delson, Mike Shinoda, Andrew Dawson, RAC, Emily Wright |
| 2017 | "I Have Questions" | Camila Cabello | Crying in the Club (Note: Featured on the 7-inch extended play Crying in the Club, "Camila Cabello - Crying In The Club Limited 7" LP | Urban Outfitters". US: Urban Outfitters. June 28, 2017. Archived from the original on April 23, 2019.) | Co-writer/Producer | Camila Cabello, Bibi Bourelly | - |
| 2017 | "Champion" | Fall Out Boy | Mania | Co-writer/Additional producer | Patrick Stump, Pete Wentz, Joe Trohman, Andrew Hurley, Sia Furler | Fall Out Boy |
| 2017 | "Ego" (featuring Ty Dolla Sign) | Ella Eyre | Non-album single | Co-writer/Producer | Ella McMahon, Fransisca Hall, Tyrone Griffin Jr. | - |
| 2017 | "Repercussions" | Bea Miller | Chapter Three: Yellow | Co-writer/Producer | Bea Miller, Julia Michaels, Justin Tranter | - |
| 2017 | "Confetti" | Sia | This Is Acting | Producer | - | - |
| 2017 | "Love So Soft" | Kelly Clarkson | Meaning of Life | Co-writer/Producer | Priscilla Renea, Maureen McDonald | MoZella, Priscilla Renea |
| 2017 | "Heat" | Kelly Clarkson | Meaning of Life | Producer | - | Mick Schultz, The Monarch, Jessica Ashley |
| 2017 | "Meaning of Life" | Kelly Clarkson | Meaning of Life | Co-writer/Producer | Ilsey Juber, James Catchpole | - |
| 2017 | "Whole Lotta Woman" | Kelly Clarkson | Meaning of Life | Co-writer/Producer | Kelly Clarkson, Jussi Karvinen, Denisia "Blu" Andrews, Brittany "Chi" Coney, Evon Barnes Jr. | Jussifer, Novawav, Fade Majah |
| 2017 | "Didn't I" | Kelly Clarkson | Meaning of Life | Producer | - | The Monarch |
| 2017 | "Don't You Pretend" | Kelly Clarkson | Meaning of Life | Co-writer/Producer | Kelly Clarkson, Maureen McDonald | - |
| 2017 | "Go High" | Kelly Clarkson | Meaning of Life | Co-writer/Producer | Kelly Clarkson, Maureen McDonald | - |
| 2017 | "The Architect" | Paloma Faith | The Architect | Producer | - | Paloma Faith |
| 2017 | "I'll Be Gentle" (featuring John Legend) | Paloma Faith | The Architect | Producer | - | Starsmith |
| 2017 | "Kings and Queens" | Paloma Faith | The Architect | Co-writer/Producer | Paloma Faith, Cass Lowe | - |
| 2017 | "Warrior" | Paloma Faith | The Architect | Producer | - | Samuel Dixon, Emre Ramazanoglu |
| 2017 | "Till I'm Done" | Paloma Faith | The Architect | Producer | - | TMS |
| 2017 | "Lost and Lonely" | Paloma Faith | The Architect | Producer | - | Eg White |
| 2017 | "WW3" | Paloma Faith | The Architect | Co-writer/Producer | Paloma Faith, Ilsey Juber | - |
| 2017 | "Tonight's Not the Only Night" | Paloma Faith | The Architect | Producer | - | Eg White |
| 2017 | "Price of Fame" | Paloma Faith | The Architect | Producer | - | Thomas Brenneck, Homer Steinweiss |
| 2017 | "I Got It" (featuring Brooke Candy, Cupcakke & Pabllo Vittar) | Charli XCX | Pop 2 | Co-writer | Charlotte Aitchison, Alexander Guy Cook, Rodriko Gorky, Pablo Bispo, Cupcakke, Arthur Marques | - |
| 2018 | "Stay Frosty Royal Milk Tea" | Fall Out Boy | Mania | Producer | - | Dave Sardy |
| 2018 | "Magic" | Sia | A Wrinkle in Time: OST | Co-writer/Producer | Sia Furler | - |
| 2018 | "Drop Top" (featuring Kassi Ashton) | Keith Urban | Graffiti U | Producer | - | Keith Urban, Jimmy Robbins |
| 2018 | "Remember Me" | Ina Wroldsen | TBA | Producer | - | - |
| 2018 | "Preacher" | Years & Years | Palo Santo | Co-writer/Producer | Olly Alexander, Julia Michaels, Justin Tranter | - |
| 2018 | "Wonderful" | Mackenzie Ziegler | Phases | Co-writer/Producer | Sia Furler | - |
| 2018 | "Just Click" | Emily Warren | Quiet Your Mind | Co-writer/Producer | Emily Schwartz, Scott Friedman | - |
| 2018 | "Limitless" | Jennifer Lopez | Second Act: OST | Co-writer/Producer | Sia Furler | - |
| 2018 | "I'm Still Here" | Sia | Non-album single | Co-writer/Producer | Sia Furler | - |
| 2018 | "Walk Alone" (featuring Tom Walker) | Rudimental | Toast to Our Differences | Co-writer/Producer | Amir Izadkhah, Piers Aggett, Kesi Dryden, Leon Rolle, Cass Lowe, Ilsey Juber, Dacoury Natche, Thomas Walker | Rudimental, Mike Spencer, JAE5 |
| 2019 | "Love Myself" | Olivia O'Brien | Was It Even Real? | Co-writer/producer | Olivia O'Brien, Anton Hård af Segerstad, Tobias Frelin | Anton Hård |
| 2020 | "I Dare You" | Kelly Clarkson | Non-album single | Co-writer/producer | Jeff Gitelman, Natalie Hemby, Laura Veltz, Ben West | - |
| 2020 | "We Belong" | Dove Cameron | Non-album single | Co-writer/producer | Dove Cameron, Casey Smith, Noonie Bao | - |
| 2020 | "Together" | Sia | Music – Songs from and Inspired by the Motion Picture | Additional producer | - | Jack Antonoff |
| 2020 | "Del Mar" | Ozuna, Doja Cat and Sia | Enoc | Co-writer | Sia Furler, Juan Carlos Ozuna, Amala Dlamini, Yazid Antonio Rivera, Starlin Rivas Rivera, Jose Cotto, José Aponte Santi, Eli Xavier, Eliezer Vargas Torres, Donny Flores, Alexis Gotay | - |
| 2020 | "Hey Boy" | Sia | Music – Songs from and Inspired by the Motion Picture | Co-writer/producer | Sia Furler, Camille Purcell | - |
| 2021 | "Eye to Eye" | Sia | Music – Songs from and Inspired by the Motion Picture | Co-writer/producer | Sia Furler | - |
| 2021 | "1+1" | Sia | Music – Songs from and Inspired by the Motion Picture | Co-writer/producer | Sia Furler | - |
| 2021 | "Lie to Me" | Sia | Music – Songs from and Inspired by the Motion Picture | Co-writer/producer | Sia Furler | - |
| 2021 | "Miracle" | Sia | Music – Songs from and Inspired by the Motion Picture | Co-writer/producer | Sia Furler | - |
| 2021 | "Pin Drop" | Sia | Everyday Is Christmas | Co-writer/producer | Sia Furler | - |
| 2021 | "Santa Visits Everyone" | Sia | Everyday Is Christmas | Co-writer/producer | Sia Furler | - |
| 2021 | "Fly Me to the Moon" | Sia | Non-album single | Producer | - | - |
| 2022 | "Naughty & Nice" | Sia | Everyday Is Christmas | Co-writer/producer | Sia Furler | - |
| 2022 | "12 Nights" | Sia | Everyday Is Christmas | Co-writer/producer | Sia Furler | - |
| 2022 | "3 Minutes 'Til New Years" | Sia | Everyday Is Christmas | Co-writer/producer | Sia Furler | - |
| 2023 | "Mine" | Kelly Clarkson | Chemistry | Co-writer/producer | Kelly Clarkson, Eric Serna | Eric Serna |
| 2023 | "Me" | Kelly Clarkson | Chemistry | Co-producer | - | Jason Halbert |
| 2023 | "Favorite Kind of High" | Kelly Clarkson | Chemistry | Co-writer/producer | Kelly Clarkson, Carly Rae Jepsen | – |
| 2023 | "I Hate Love" | Kelly Clarkson | Chemistry | Co-writer/producer | Kelly Clarkson, Nick Jonas | – |
| 2023 | "Violet Chemistry" | Miley Cyrus | Endless Summer Vacation | Co-writer/producer | Miley Cyrus, Sia, Michael Len Williams II, James Blake | Max Taylor-Sheppard, Mike Will Made It, Maxx Morando |
| 2023 | "I Feel Love" | Freya Ridings | Blood Orange | Co-writer/producer | Freya Ridings, Wrabel | – |
| 2023 | Waiting for It" | Ellie Goulding | Higher Than Heaven | Co-writer/producer | Ellie Goulding, Maureen McDonald | – |
| 2023 | "Gimme Love" | Sia | Reasonable Woman | Co-writer/producer | Sia Furler | – |
| 2024 | "Dance Alone" | Sia and Kylie Minogue | Reasonable Woman | Co-writer/producer | Sia Furler | Jim-E Stack |
| 2024 | "Little Wing" | Sia | Reasonable Woman | Co-writer/producer | Sia Furler | – |
| 2024 | "I Had a Heart" | Sia | Reasonable Woman | Co-writer/producer | Sia Furler, Rosalía Tobella | – |
| 2024 | "Nowhere to Be" | Sia | Reasonable Woman | Co-writer/producer | Sia Furler | – |
| 2024 | "Towards the Sun" | Sia | Reasonable Woman | Co-writer/producer | Sia Furler | – |
| 2024 | "Champion" | Sia featuring Tierra Whack, Kaliii and Jimmy Jolliff | Reasonable Woman | Co-writer/producer | Sia Furler, Joshua Goods, Charlie Heat, Jimmy Jolliff, Kaliii, Tierra Whack | Charlie Heat |
| 2024 | "One Night" | Sia | Reasonable Woman | Co-writer/producer | Sia Furler, Bülow, Gabriel Noel, Max Wolfgang | – |
| 2024 | "Go On" | Sia | Reasonable Woman | Co-writer/producer | Sia Furler, Jasper Harris, Magnus Høiberg, Benjamin Levin | Benny Blanco, Jasper Harris |
| 2024 | "Rock and Balloon" | Sia | Reasonable Woman | Co-writer/producer | Sia Furler | – |
| 2025 | "Little Monster" | Illit | Bomb | Co-writer/producer | Caroline Ailin, Dyvahh, "Hitman" Bang, Vincenzo, January 8th, 3!, Maryjane, Dana, Kim Bo-eun, Leekyung, So Do-yeon, Vendors (Chiller and Owl), Jo Yoon-kyung, Bay, Miah, Lee Yi-jin, Ellie Suh, Yoonchae | – |
