= The Wonderful World of Disney: Disneyland 60 =

The Wonderful World of Disney: Disneyland 60 was a television special celebrating the 60th anniversary of the Disneyland theme park in Anaheim, California, which aired on ABC on February 21, 2016. The special was largely broadcast from the Hollywood and Highland Center. It is the second episode of the re-incarnation of The Wonderful World of Disney (originally aired from 1954 to 2008), after returning as an infrequent series of specials in 2015.

The show was introduced by Dancing with the Stars performers Derek Hough and Witney Carson.

The trailer for Pete's Dragon debuted during the special.

== Starring ==
- Alfonso Ribeiro
- Ariel Winter
- Bryce Dallas Howard
- Dame Helen Mirren
- Derek Hough
- Dick Van Dyke
- Eric Stonestreet
- Ginnifer Goodwin
- Harrison Ford
- Hilary Duff
- Jason Bateman
- Jessica Alba
- Jimmy Kimmel
- John Lasseter
- John Stamos
- Josh Gad
- Julie Bowen
- Kerry Washington
- Kiefer Sutherland
- Kristen Bell
- Lupita Nyong'o
- Neil Patrick Harris
- Nolan Gould
- P!nk
- Priyanka Chopra
- Robin Roberts
- Sabrina Carpenter
- Sarah Hyland
- Sofia Carson
- Ty Burrell
- Viola Davis
- Whoopi Goldberg
- Witney Carson
- Zendaya

== Performances ==
- Fall Out Boys
- Gustavo Dudamel and the Los Angeles Philharmonic
- Idina Menzel
- Jessie J
- Kelsea Ballerini
- Kermit the Frog
- Little Big Town
- Ne-Yo
- Pentatonix
- Sir Elton John
- Star Wars: In Concert
- Tori Kelly

== Segments ==
- Opening sequence, featuring Dancing With The Stars pro dancers and Pentatonix performing a special version of "Be Our Guest"
- Jessie J sings "When You Wish Upon A Star"
- Title sequence naming all stars and performers
- Dame Helen Mirren talks about Walt Disney and how he created Disneyland
- Walt Disney tribute showing different clips of him with different stars talking about him
- Derek Hough talks about the Disney Applause App
- Hilary Duff talks about the C.K. Holiday train, and specials about Disneyland
- Josh Gad takes you on a small tour of Disneyland, and shows the Disneyland Dream Suite
- Derek Hough introduces John Stamos
- John Stamos talks about Fall Out Boy
- Fall Out Boy sings "I Wan'na Be Like You"
- Pete's Dragon trailer introduced by Bryce Dallas Howard
- Mickey Mouse tribute, introduced by Bryce Dallas Howard
- Jimmy Kimmel introduces Elton John
- Sir Elton John performs "Circle of Life" at Sleeping Beauty Castle
- Neil Patrick Harris talks about Make-A-Wish Foundation and #ShareYourEars
- Kelsea Ballerini introduces Tori Kelly and Kermit the Frog
- Tori Kelly and Kermit the Frog perform "The Rainbow Connection"
- Cast of Modern Family talk about what they do in Disneyland
- Kerry Washington introduces a Disney Princess tribute
- Sabrina Carpenter and Sofia Carson introduce Idina Menzel
- "Let It Go", performed by Idina Menzel at Disney California Adventure's Paradise Pier
- Dance themed clip reel, set to the song "Rapper's Delight" by The Sugarhill Gang, introduced by Witney Carson and Alfonso Ribeiro
- Dance sequences, introduced by Carson and Ribeiro
  - "Part of Your World", featuring Kelsea Ballerini, dancers included Maddie Ziegler
  - "Friend Like Me", featuring Ne-Yo
  - "Step in Time", featuring Derek Hough and including an appearance by Dick van Dyke
- Harrison Ford, talking about the moviegoing experience, his involvement in the Star Wars films, and Star Wars Land
- Star Wars: In Concert, introduced by Ford, and including a cameo by BB-8
- "Steve McQueen" performed by Little Big Town in Cars Land, introduced by Hough
- Segment on recent Disneyland additions, hosted by Whoopi Goldberg
- Zootopia clip introduced by Ginnifer Goodwin and Jason Bateman
- Segment on Disney animation, stories and characters, hosted by John Lasseter, introduced by Goodwin and Bateman
- "The Sorcerer's Apprentice", performed by the Los Angeles Philharmonic at the Walt Disney Concert Hall, accompanied with footage of The Sorcerer's Apprentice segment of Fantasia, introduced by Kiefer Sutherland
- A segment on Shanghai Disney Resort, introduced and narrated by Priyanka Chopra
- "Wonderful Crazy Night", performed by Sir Elton John at Sleeping Beauty Castle, introduced by Derek Hough

== Disney Short Films Clips ==
- Steamboat Willie (1928)
- Plane Crazy (1929)
- Lonesome Ghosts (1937)
- Mickey's Trailer (1938)

== Walt Disney Animation Studios Films Clips ==
- Snow White and the Seven Dwarfs (1937)
- Pinocchio (1940)
- Fantasia (1940)
- Dumbo (1941)
- Bambi (1942)
- Cinderella (1950)
- Alice in Wonderland (1951)
- Peter Pan (1953)
- Lady and the Tramp (1955)
- Sleeping Beauty (1959)
- One Hundred and One Dalmatians (1961)
- The Sword in the Stone (1963)
- Mary Poppins (1964)
- The Jungle Book (1967)
- The Aristocats (1970)
- Bedknobs and Broomsticks (1971)
- Robin Hood (1973)
- The Many Adventures of Winnie the Pooh (1977)
- Pete's Dragon (1977)
- The Fox and the Hound (1981)
- The Little Mermaid (1989)
- Beauty and the Beast (1991)
- Aladdin (1992)
- The Lion King (1994)
- Pocahontas (1995)
- The Hunchback of Notre Dame (1996)
- Hercules (1997)
- Mulan (1998)
- Tarzan (1999)
- The Emperor's New Groove (2000)
- Lilo & Stitch (2002)
- Enchanted (2007)
- Bolt (2008)
- The Princess and the Frog (2009)
- Tangled (2010)
- Winnie the Pooh (2011)
- Wreck-It Ralph (2012)
- Frozen (2013)
- Big Hero 6 (2014)

== Pixar films Clips ==
- Toy Story (1995)
- Toy Story 2 (1999)
- Monsters, Inc. (2001)
- Finding Nemo (2003)
- The Incredibles (2004)
- Cars (2006)
- Ratatouille (2007)
- WALL-E (2008)
- Up (2009)
- Toy Story 3 (2010)
- Cars 2 (2011)
- Brave (2012)
- Monsters University (2013)
- Inside Out (2015)

== The Muppets films Clips ==
- The Muppet Movie (1979)
- The Great Muppet Caper (1981)
- Muppet Treasure Island (1996)
- The Muppets (2011)
- Muppets Most Wanted (2014)

== Star Wars films Clips ==
- Star Wars (1977)
- The Empire Strikes Back (1980)
- Return of the Jedi (1983)
- Star Wars: Episode II Attack of the Clones (2002)
- Star Wars: Episode III Revenge of the Sith (2005)
- Star Wars: The Force Awakens (2015)

== Upcoming Disney Films Clips/Trailers ==
- The Jungle Book (2016)
- Pete's Dragon (2016)
- Alice Through the Looking Glass (2016)
- Zootopia (2016)
- Finding Dory (2016)
- Moana (2016)

== Production ==
The special was produced by Den of Thieves & Lincoln Square Productions.

- Executive producers: Jesse Ignatovic, Evan Prager
- Director: Louis J. Horvitz
- Disneyland Resorts segments director: Sandra Restrepo Considini
