= Courage to Change (song) =

Single by Sia

from the album Music – Songs from and Inspired by the Motion Picture
- Released: 24 September 2020
- Studio: Echo (Los Angeles)
- Genre: Pop
- Length: 4:52
- Label: Monkey Puzzle; Atlantic
- Songwriter(s): Sia Furler; Alecia Moore; Greg Kurstin
- Producer(s): Greg Kurstin

Sia singles chronology
"Let's Love" (2020)	"Courage to Change" (2020)	"Cold" (2020)

Lyric video
- "Courage To Change" on YouTube

"Courage to Change" is a song by Australian singer-songwriter Sia, released on 24 September 2020 through Monkey Puzzle and Atlantic Records. It is taken from her ninth studio album, Music – Songs from and Inspired by the Motion Picture, which features songs from musical film Music, co-written and directed by herself. It is the second single from the album, following the lead single, "Together".

== Release and promotion ==
"Courage to Change" is the second single released from Sia's ninth studio album, Music – Songs from and Inspired by the Motion Picture, which features songs written, by Sia, for and inspired by musical film Music. The album was released on 12 February 2021 in connection with the release of Music.

The single was announced on Sia's social media accounts on 23 September 2020, the day before its release. Sia performed "Courage to Change" at the 2020 Billboard Music Awards on 14 October 2020 and at the NRJ Music Awards on 5 September. A lyric video for the track premiered on 11 January 2021. The Michael Calfan remix of the song was released on 10 June 2022.

== Composition ==
"Courage to Change" was written by Sia, Pink and frequent collaborator Greg Kurstin, and production was handled solely by Kurstin. At a length of 4:52, it interpolates Pink's song "Courage", from her album Hurts 2B Human, also co-written by Sia. The song is composed in the key of B minor. Opening with an intro of "moody" strings, "Courage to Change" builds into an "enormous", "soaring" chorus that has simple, repetitive but inspirational lyrics, with a "driving message of empowerment; "Have I the courage to change?/ Have I the courage to change today?".

Wongo Okon of Uproxx described the song as "another graceful effort, aiming to empower its listeners to be their most [courageous] selves".

== Charts ==
=== Weekly charts ===
Weekly chart performance for "Courage to Change"
Chart (2020–2021)	Peak position
Australia (ARIA)	180
Belgium (Ultratop 50 Wallonia)	7
France (SNEP)	48
Global 200 (Billboard)	194
Slovakia (Rádio Top 100)	95
Sweden Heatseeker (Sverigetopplistan)	19
Switzerland (Schweizer Hitparade)	21

=== Year-end charts ===
Year-end chart performance for "Courage to Change"
Chart (2021)	Position
Belgium (Ultratop Wallonia)	55
France (SNEP)	191

== Certifications ==
Certifications for "Courage to Change"
Region	Certification	Certified units/sales
France (SNEP)	Platinum	200,000^{‡}
Poland (ZPAV)	Gold	25,000^{‡}
^{‡} Sales+streaming figures based on certification alone.

== Release history ==
Release history and formats for "Courage to Change"
Region	Date	Format	Version	Label	Ref.
Various	24 September 2020	Digital download; streaming	Original	Monkey Puzzle; Atlantic	
Various	10 June 2022	Digital download; streaming	Michael Calfan remix	Monkey Puzzle; Atlantic	
