= Dallas Clayton =

American author and illustrator

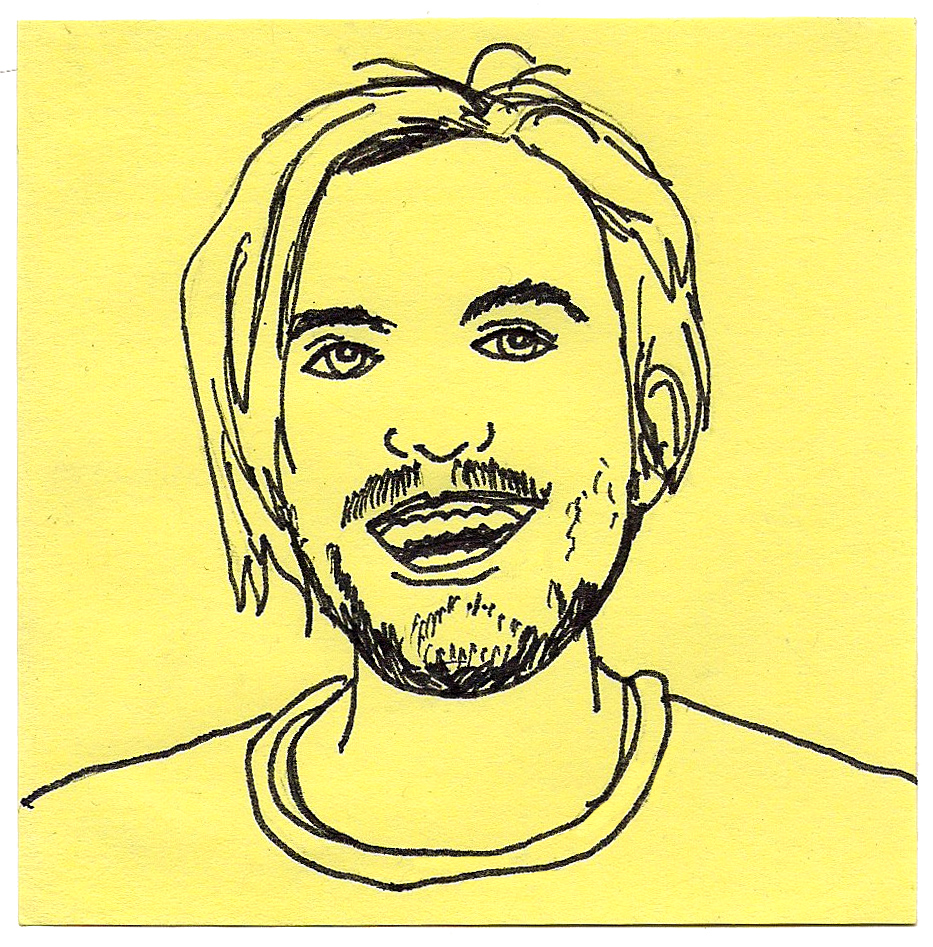
- A drawing of Dallas Clayton by Topher McCulloch in 2014
- Occupations: Illustrator, writer
- Children: 1
- Writing career
- Years active: 2008–present
- Genre: Children's literature
- Notable work: An Awesome Book!
- Website: dallasclayton.com

Dallas Clayton is an American author and illustrator best known for his children's works in the Awesome Book series.

== Early career ==
Clayton began his writing career by self-publishing small run short story zines which he distributed in art galleries, music venues, and on street corners throughout the U.S.

== Work ==
After the birth of his son in 2003, Clayton wrote, illustrated, and published An Awesome Book!, a 64-page children's picture book about "dreaming big". After being turned down by several major publishing houses Clayton opted to self-publish An Awesome Book! by posting the book for free online and using mostly non-traditional means of distribution, after which the book sold over 50,000 copies to date.

Clayton was hired in 2009 as the editor-in-chief of We Love You So, an art magazine founded by director Spike Jonze, designed to tie into with Where the Wild Things Are, Jonze's adaptation of the children's book of the same title.

Clayton released his next book, An Awesome Book of Thanks! (2010) through online bookseller Amazon.com's new publishing imprint, AmazonEncore. An Awesome Book of Thanks! followed the pattern of An Awesome Book!, this time delivering a message about the importance of being thankful.

In 2011, The Hollywood Reporter announced that Clayton had signed a three-book deal with HarperCollins as well a two-book deal with Candlewick Press. An Awesome Book! received a full scale re-release from Harpercollins in March 2012. 2012 also saw the release of Awesome Book of Love! (Harper).

Clayton released a collection of children's poetry entitled Make Magic! Do Good! (Candlewick Press) in 2012.

He released a "children's book for adults" entitled It's Never Too Late through P. Putnam's Sons in 2013.

Clayton's 2014 releases included A is for Awesome and Lily the Unicorn.

In 2016, he wrote an early draft of a film adaptation of Harold and the Purple Crayon for Sony Pictures Animation before the film was cancelled.

Clayton, along with Australian singer-songwriter Sia, wrote the screenplay for musical film Music, which was released February 2021.

== Personal life ==
With actress Shannyn Sossamon, Clayton has one son, named Audio Science, who was born on May 29, 2003.

Clayton founded the non-profit Awesome World Foundation in 2009 with the intention of traveling the world, reading to kids, and promoting childhood literacy. The foundation has donated books worldwide and supported various other children's causes.

== Bibliography ==
- An Awesome Book! (November 1, 2008)
- An Awesome Book of Thanks! (November 18, 2010)
- Make Magic! Do Good! (November 13, 2012)
- An Awesome Book of Love! (December 26, 2012)
- It's Never Too Late (November 7, 2013) ISBN 9780399163081
- A Is for Awesome (March 11, 2014)
- Lily the Unicorn (April 22, 2014)
