= Music – Songs from and Inspired by the Motion Picture =

Studio album by Sia
- Released: 12 February 2021
- Studios: Conway (Los Angeles); Electric Lady (New York City); The Rib Cage (Los Angeles); Melrose Music (Palm Springs, California); Beachwood Park (Los Angeles); Echo (Los Angeles); Janitor (London); RAK (London)
- Genre: Pop
- Length: 49:22
- Labels: Monkey Puzzle; Atlantic
- Producers: Jack Antonoff; Jesse Shatkin; Greg Kurstin; David Guetta; Mike Hawkins; Toby Green; Labrinth; Oliver Kraus; Sia

Sia chronology
Everyday Is Christmas (2017)	Music – Songs from and Inspired by the Motion Picture (2021)	Reasonable Woman (2024)

Singles from Music
- 1. "Together" Released: 20 May 2020; 2. "Courage to Change" Released: 24 September 2020; 3. "Hey Boy" Released: 19 November 2020; 4. "Floating Through Space" Released: 19 February 2021

Music – Songs from and Inspired by the Motion Picture is the ninth studio album by Australian singer-songwriter Sia. It was released on 12 February 2021 by Monkey Puzzle and Atlantic, in connection with the release of the musical film Music, which was directed and co-written by Sia.

Sia wrote 10 original songs for the film's soundtrack following its transformation into a musical, half of which are included on the album. The album also includes songs inspired by the film, such as "Saved My Life", co-written by Dua Lipa. Primarily a pop album, it received mixed reviews from critics. Three singles preceded the album's release; "Together", the album's lead single, "Courage to Change", co-written with Pink (credited as Alecia Moore), and "Hey Boy". "Floating Through Space", a collaboration with David Guetta, was released as the fourth single shortly after the album came out.

At the 2021 ARIA Music Awards, the album was nominated for Best Original Soundtrack, Cast or Show Album.

== Background ==
Sia did not conceive Music as a musical film. She said that friends told her it would be like "[having] a blank Scrabble chip, and not using it" if she did not make the film as a musical. She stated that the film's budget increased from $4 million to $16 million with its transformation into a musical, as the studio could profit from the soundtrack. Sia wrote 10 original songs for the film. In February 2020, she stated that she had two albums "waiting to go", one of which included her versions of the original soundtrack songs. Along with new material inspired by the film, some of the 10 original songs are featured on Music – Songs from and Inspired by the Motion Picture. The album has a total of 14 tracks; the Japanese edition of the album features two domestic bonus tracks, "I'm Still Here", which was first released in 2018, and the Initial Talk remix of "Together".

Sia considers this a studio album rather than a soundtrack album. The film's soundtrack was never released separately as an album.

== Composition ==
Music is a pop album with electropop, R&B, reggae and EDM influences.

The album opens with "Together", a track written by Sia and Jack Antonoff. It is an upbeat pop song that "bounces with joy". "Hey Boy" is a "euphoric", "exuberant", "flirty" and "bouncy" pop and dancehall song, in which, lyrically, Sia expresses a desire for male company. "Saved My Life", co-written by British singer-songwriter Dua Lipa, is a pop ballad that opens up as a piano-based ballad and slowly builds into a grand track filled with strings and an uptempo beat. "Floating Through Space" is a dance-pop track that features electric and upbeat synths and inspiring lyrics. The song bears more resemblance to Sia's style of pop music than her previous collaborations with David Guetta. "Eye to Eye" is an 80s-themed, electropop song that features Moog synths. The album's title track is a "cinematic" power ballad with orchestral influences, while "1+1" is a "breezy", summery track, built on a dance-pop instrumental.

"Courage to Change", which interpolates Pink's "Courage", also co-written by Sia, is more downtempo and builds from a "moody" string intro into a "soaring" chorus that has simple, repetitive but "uplifting" chorus lyrics; "Have I the courage to change?/ Have I the courage to change today?". "Play Dumb", a song built around "vintage" synths and bass sounds, is reminiscent of old-school hip hop and has G-funk-influenced production. "Beautiful Things Can Happen" is a piano ballad produced by Labrinth, and filled with Sia's signature vocal cracks. "Lie to Me" is an orchestral ballad that opens with a "delicate" intro with "string-like" orchestrations, before building into a "massive", atmospheric chorus. "Oblivion" features guest vocals from Labrinth, and is a re-recorded version of the same song included on his 2019 album, Imagination & the Misfit Kid. Musically, it is built around "distorted beats" and a string orchestra. "Miracle" is a tropical song. The album closes with an alternate version of "Hey Boy", featuring Burna Boy, who lends a verse.

== Singles and promotion ==
"Together" and its accompanying music video were released as the album's lead single on 20 May 2020. "Courage to Change" was released as the second single on 24 September 2020. The album was made available for pre-order on 19 November 2020, along with the release of "Hey Boy" as the third single. Sia announced the album's tracklist on 13 January 2021. An alternate version of "Hey Boy" featuring Nigerian singer Burna Boy was released alongside an animated video on 14 January 2021.

"Floating Through Space" was originally released as the album's first promotional single with its music video on 4 February 2021, and was serviced to contemporary hit radio in Italy on 19 February 2021. Five (Note: In addition, a shorter version of "Eye to Eye", with alternate lyrics, appears on the film soundtrack as "Could I Love with No Fear".) of the songs from the album appear on the film's soundtrack: "Together", "Music", "1+1", "Beautiful Things Can Happen", and, as the credits track, "Courage to Change". Remixes of "Eye to Eye" were released on 4 June 2021. Three Banx & Ranx remixes of "1+1" were then released; the first, featuring guest vocals from Israeli-French singer-songwriter Amir Haddad, was released on 13 July 2021. This was followed by a solo version on 23 July, and, on 6 August, a Spanish-language remix featuring Sofía Reyes and Yandel.

== Critical reception ==
Professional ratings
Aggregate scores
Source	Rating
AnyDecentMusic?	5.3/10
Metacritic	57/100
Review scores
Source	Rating
AllMusic	3/5 stars
The Arts Desk	2/5 stars
The Australian	3.5/5 stars
Entertainment Weekly	C−
Evening Standard	3/5 stars
MusicOMH	2.5/5 stars
NME	3/5 stars
Rolling Stone	2.5/5 stars
The Observer	3/5 stars

At Metacritic, which assigns a normalised score out of 100 to ratings from publications, the album received an average score of 57 based on 6 critic reviews, indicating a "mixed or average" response.

Mark Richardson of The Wall Street Journal described the album as "feel-good", although "generic". Writing for Associated Press, Mark Kennedy called the album "very, very good" and commented that songs on the record display some of the "most restrained and mature" songwriting Sia has ever done. He stated, however, that as a lyricist Sia's "often gets stuck in repetitive choruses", which he finds to be present in Music. The Evening Standard's David Smyth gave the album a rating of 3 out of 5 stars, and wrote that the songs' "melodies stick right away" and that there are "enough eccentric touches". Kitty Empire of The Observer gave the same rating, writing that the "sound design" on the album is "excellent throughout", but commenting that it would be easier to appreciate the songs without the controversy surrounding the film.

Hilary Hughes of Entertainment Weekly criticized the album, writing that the lyrical theme of "motivational language" flies "dangerously close to inspiration porn". In RIFF Magazine, Domenic Strazzabosco wrote that Music "fails to strike a chord", commenting that Sia has compiled "a rather monotonous collection of songs" in the album. Keith Harris of Rolling Stone wrote that the album "lacks a big hit" to pull together a "competent level of craft". He also opined that the album's highlights are its more upbeat songs, such as "Hey Boy", "1+1" and "Play Dumb". NME's Nick Levine stated that the album offers "glimpses" of Sia's "undeniable greatness", though he also commented that the highlights are not enough to make Music "feel as vital as top-notch Sia efforts".

== Track listing ==
Music – Songs from and Inspired by the Motion Picture track listing
No.	Title	Writer(s)	Producer(s)	Length
1.	"Together"	Sia Furler; Jack Antonoff	Antonoff; Jesse Shatkin^{[a]}	3:25
2.	"Hey Boy"	Furler; Kamille; Jesse Shatkin	Shatkin	2:29
3.	"Saved My Life"	Furler; Dua Lipa; Greg Kurstin	Kurstin	3:55
4.	"Floating Through Space" (with David Guetta)	Furler; Kurstin	David Guetta; Kurstin; Mike Hawkins; Toby Green	2:57
5.	"Eye to Eye"	Furler; Shatkin	Shatkin	4:19
6.	"Music"	Furler; Christopher Braide	Labrinth; Oliver Kraus; Braide^{[b]}	4:58
7.	"1+1"	Furler; Shatkin	Shatkin	2:58
8.	"Courage to Change"	Furler; Alecia Moore; Kurstin	Kurstin	4:52
9.	"Play Dumb"	Furler; Antonoff	Furler; Antonoff	3:03
10.	"Beautiful Things Can Happen"	Furler; Matt Corby	Labrinth; Corby^{[a]}	2:50
11.	"Lie to Me"	Furler; Shatkin	Shatkin	3:03
12.	"Oblivion" (featuring Labrinth)	Furler; Timothy McKenzie	Labrinth; Ilya^{[a]}	4:14
13.	"Miracle"	Furler; Shatkin	Shatkin	3:18
14.	"Hey Boy" (featuring Burna Boy)	Furler; Kamille; Shatkin; Damini Ebunoluwa Ogulu	Shatkin	3:01
Total length:				49:22

French edition bonus track
No.	Title	Writer(s)	Producer(s)	Length
15.	"1+1" (featuring Amir - Banx & Ranx Remix)	Furler; Shatkin; Amir Haddad; Nazim Khaled; Yannick Rastogi; Zacharie Raymond	Shatkin; Banx & Ranx	3:16
Total length:				52:45

Japanese edition bonus tracks
No.	Title	Writer(s)	Producer(s)	Length
15.	"I'm Still Here"	Furler; Shatkin	Shatkin	4:01
16.	"Together" (Initial Talk Remix)	Furler; Antonoff	Antonoff; Shatkin^{[a]}	3:18
Total length:				56:41

- ^{^[a]} signifies an additional producer
- ^{^[b]} signifies a vocal producer

== Personnel ==
Credits adapted from Tidal and album liner notes.

Musicians

- Sia – vocals
- Jack Antonoff – drums, piano (1, 9); background vocals, keyboards, programming, synthesizer (1); Mellotron, Moog, percussion (9)
- Jesse Shatkin – bass guitar, drum programming, drums, keyboards, synthesizer (1, 2, 5, 7, 13, 14); programming (1, 5, 7, 13, 14), guitar (2, 13, 14), organ (2, 14), percussion (2, 5, 7, 13, 14), piano (5, 13), vocals (13)
- Sean Kantrowitz – guitar (2, 14)
- Greg Kurstin – bass guitar, drums, guitar, piano, programming (3, 8); keyboards (3, 4, 8)
- Labrinth – programming (6, 10, 12), synthesizer (6, 10), orchestral arrangement (10, 12), instrumentation (12), vocals (12)
- Evan Smith – saxophone (9)
- Gustave Rudman – orchestral arrangement (10, 12)
- Burna Boy – vocals (14)

Notable technical personnel

- Serban Ghenea – mixer (1, 2, 12, 14)
- Greg Kurstin – mixer, engineer (3, 4)
- Chris Gehringer – mastering engineer (1–3, 8, 14)
- Jesse Shatkin – engineer (1, 2, 5, 7, 11, 13, 14)
- Labrinth – engineer (6, 10, 12)

== Charts ==
=== Weekly charts ===
Weekly chart performance for Music – Songs from and Inspired by the Motion Picture
Chart (2021)	Peak position
Australian Albums (ARIA)	12
Austrian Albums (Ö3 Austria)	49
Belgian Albums (Ultratop Flanders)	111
Belgian Albums (Ultratop Wallonia)	22
Canadian Albums (Billboard)	88
Czech Albums (ČNS IFPI)	72
Dutch Albums (Album Top 100)	29
French Albums (SNEP)	29
German Albums (Offizielle Top 100)	28
Hungarian Albums (MAHASZ)	29
Japan Hot Albums (Billboard Japan)	36
Japanese Albums (Oricon)	45
Lithuanian Albums (AGATA)	69
Norwegian Albums (VG-lista)	20
Polish Albums (ZPAV)	50
Scottish Albums (Official Charts)	70
Slovak Albums (ČNS IFPI)	69
Spanish Albums (Promusicae)	45
Swiss Albums (Schweizer Hitparade)	5
UK Albums (Official Charts)	90
US Soundtrack Albums (Billboard)	8
US Top Album Sales (Billboard)	66

=== Year-end charts ===
Year-end chart performance for Music – Songs from and Inspired by the Motion Picture
Chart (2021)	Position
Dutch Albums (Album Top 100)	82
French Albums (SNEP)	160

== Certifications ==
Certifications for Music – Songs from and Inspired by the Motion Picture
Region	Certification	Certified units/sales
France (SNEP)	Gold	50,000^{‡}
^{‡} Sales+streaming figures based on certification alone.

== Release history ==
Release history for Music – Songs from and Inspired by the Motion Picture
Country	Date	Format	Label	Ref.
Various	12 February 2021	CD; cassette; digital download; streaming	Monkey Puzzle; Atlantic	
Various	23 April 2021	LP	Atlantic	
