= Saved My Life (Sia song) =

Single by Sia
- Released: 2 May 2020
- Studio: Echo (Los Angeles)
- Genre: Pop
- Length: 3:55
- Label: Monkey Puzzle; Atlantic
- Songwriters: Sia Furler; Dua Lipa; Greg Kurstin
- Producer: Greg Kurstin

Sia singles chronology
"On" (2020)	"Saved My Life" (2020)	"Together" (2020)

Audio video
- "Saved My Life" on YouTube

"Saved My Life" is a song performed by Australian singer-songwriter Sia. The song was released on 2 May 2020, after she performed it during the online COVID Is No Joke live comedy fest hosted by AmeriCares during the COVID-19 pandemic. The proceeds from the song benefit AmeriCares and CORE Response. It is featured on Sia's ninth studio album, Music – Songs from and Inspired by the Motion Picture (2021). Lyrically, the song is about her friend saving her from suicide in 2016.

== Background and composition ==
Sia wrote "Saved My Life" in a session with British singer-songwriter Dua Lipa. It is a pop ballad which features piano, keyboards, bass, drums and guitar played by Kurstin. The track opens up as a piano ballad and slowly builds into a grand track filled with strings and an uptempo beat. Sia's vocal performance on the track was described as "passionate" by MXDWN. "Saved My Life" has a length of three minutes and fifty-five seconds.

== Credits and personnel ==
Credits adapted from Tidal.

- Sia – writer, vocals
- Dua Lipa – writer
- Greg Kurstin – writer, producer, bass, drums, guitar, keyboards, piano, programming, engineer, mixer, masterer
- Julian Burg – engineer
- Chris Gehringer – masterer

== Charts ==
Chart (2020)	Peak position
Switzerland (Schweizer Hitparade)	79
