= Music (2021 film) =

2021 film directed by Sia

- Theatrical release poster
- Directed by: Sia
- Screenplay by: Sia; Dallas Clayton
- Story by: Sia
- Produced by: Sia; Vincent Landay
- Starring: Kate Hudson; Leslie Odom Jr.; Maddie Ziegler
- Cinematography: Sebastian Winterø
- Edited by: Matt Chessé; Curtiss Clayton; Dana Congdon
- Music by: Craig DeLeon
- Production companies: HanWay Films; Atlantic Films; Pineapple Lasagne Productions; Landay Entertainment; Crush Films
- Distributed by: HanWay Films (international); Vertical Entertainment (United States)
- Release dates: January 14, 2021 (Australia); February 12, 2021 (United States)
- Running time: 107 minutes
- Country: United States
- Language: English
- Budget: $16 million
- Box office: $645,949

Music is a 2021 American musical drama film directed by singer-songwriter Sia. The film was co-written by Sia and Dallas Clayton, and stars Kate Hudson, Leslie Odom Jr. and Maddie Ziegler. It marks Sia's feature film directorial debut. The film follows Zu, a newly sober drug dealer who becomes the sole guardian of her half-sister Music, a teenage nonverbal autistic girl.

The film began development following Sia's announcement of the project in 2015. Originally intended as a non-musical film, it was subsequently re-conceived as a musical with a larger budget, and was filmed in mid-2017. A studio album by Sia was also released in connection with the film, including some of the 10 songs she wrote for it.

Music was released in Australia on January 14, 2021, by StudioCanal, and in select IMAX theatres in the United States for one night on February 10, 2021, followed by an on-demand release on February 12, 2021, by Vertical Entertainment. The film was a commercial failure, grossing $645,949 against its $16 million budget, and received largely unfavorable reviews from critics, with most criticism stemming from its depiction of autism. It was nominated for Best Motion Picture – Musical or Comedy and Best Actress – Motion Picture Comedy or Musical (Hudson) at the 78th Golden Globe Awards, but was also nominated for four Golden Raspberry Awards, winning Worst Actress for Hudson, Worst Supporting Actress for Ziegler and Worst Director for Sia.

== Plot ==
Newly sober alcoholic Kazu "Zu" Gamble is left as the sole guardian of her teenage, nonverbal autistic half-sister, Music, following the death of their grandmother, Millie, who raised Music. Zu deals drugs with the help of her friend Rudy but is unable to pay him back as she is unemployed. One morning soon after Zu begins to care for her, Music has a meltdown when Zu is unable to braid her hair. Her neighbor, Ebo, comes to help calm Music, and Zu and Ebo form a friendship. Ebo tells Zu that he is a boxer and teaches boxing to children, one of them being Felix, who dislikes boxing but is forced to do it by his father. Felix lives opposite Music and is often seen watching her. Zu learns how to take care of Music with Ebo's help but continues to deal drugs to fund her dream to move to Costa Rica.

After Ebo reveals that his ex-wife left him for his brother, Zu promises to accompany him to their wedding. Rudy asks Zu to deliver HIV medication to a buyer, later revealed to be Ebo. When Zu and Music go for a walk, Zu becomes distracted, and Music is stung by a bee. Music suffers an allergic reaction and is hospitalized. Zu cannot afford the treatment and realizes that she has left her bag in the park, which contained drugs intended to be sold to a pop star. Distraught, Zu suffers a relapse and begins drinking. While intoxicated, she gets into a fight with Ebo's neighbor, and the police are called; she admits to Ebo that she is on probation. The same night, Felix attempts to intervene during a physical altercation between his parents, and his father accidentally kills Felix.

Sometime later, Ebo attends his brother's wedding alone. Meanwhile, Zu brings Music to an adoption center but cannot bring herself to leave her there. They decide to join Ebo at the wedding, where Zu and Ebo share a kiss on stage and prepare to sing as Ebo plays the piano. Music interrupts and begins to sing herself. Later, the three are together happily preparing Music's breakfast. Music is given a new support dog, which Felix had arranged for her prior to his death.

== Cast ==
- Kate Hudson as Kazu "Zu" Gamble
- Maddie Ziegler as Music Gamble
- Leslie Odom Jr. as Ebo Odom
- Héctor Elizondo as George
- Mary Kay Place as Millie
- Brandon Soo Hoo as Tanner
- Tig Notaro as Radgicals TV show host
- Alexandria Lee as Radgical
- Beto Calvillo as Felix Chang
- Celeste Den as Felix's mom
- Luoyong Wang as Felix's dad
- Ben Schwartz as Rudy
- Juliette Lewis as Evelyn
- Kathy Najimy as Evelyn's mom
- Henry Rollins as Ebo's neighbor
- Parvesh Cheena as Electronics Store Manager
- Blair Williamson as Abel
- Braeden Marcott as Nassir
- Zander Ayeroff as Cleo
- Sia as Popstar Without Borders

== Production ==
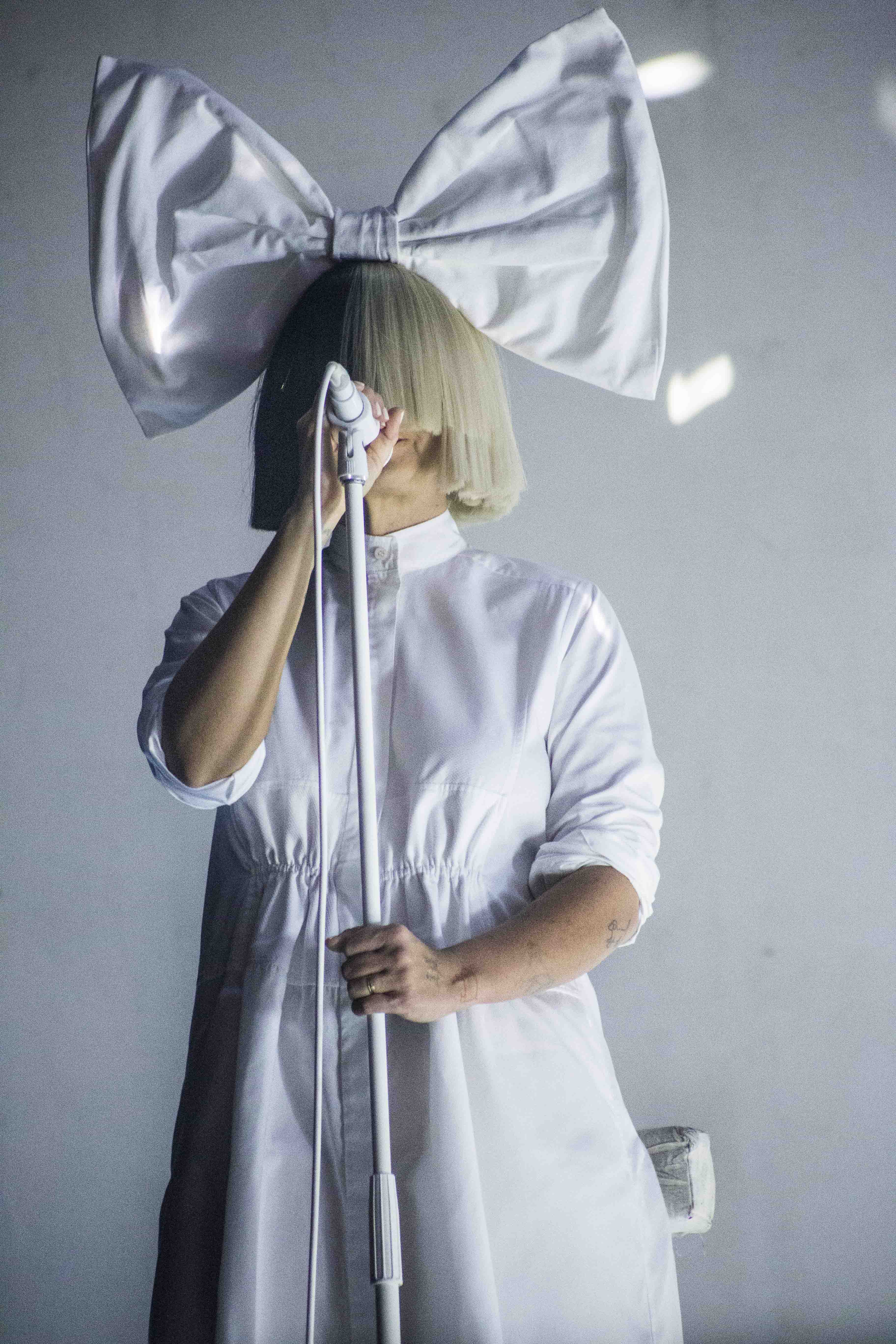
Sia at her concert in Boston in May 2016

Sia announced the film, her directorial debut, at the 2015 Venice Film Festival, to star Maddie Ziegler, who starred in a series of music videos that Sia co-directed with Daniel Askill and who has danced in many of Sia's live performances. After creating the music video for "Chandelier" in 2014, Sia had decided that she was "pretty good" at directing and "felt a little bit braver". The film's screenplay was co-written by Sia and children's book author Dallas Clayton based on a one-page story that she had written in 2007. Sia enjoyed the creative process and noted similarities between directing and writing songs, saying:

For me, the process was basically, I work out the movie. I'll act it out, I'll have the dialogue already in my head... I can't be bothered to learn Final Draft. Like, when I sing, I just want to sing the melody and write the lyrics. I don't want to have to do production, which is very technical. I don't enjoy that.

The project, originally conceived as a non-musical film, was subsequently made into a musical. The transformation into a musical saw the film's budget increase from $4 million to $16 million. Songs were written by Sia, with choreography by her frequent collaborator Ryan Heffington. It was first given the working title Sister and subsequently renamed Music. The character of Zu was originally planned to be male, and was to be portrayed by Shia LaBeouf, then Jonah Hill. After Sia saw an Instagram post of Kate Hudson singing, she cast her and changed the sex of the role. Most of the film's casting was organized through social media. The film was shot in mid-2017 over 40 days. At the time, Ziegler was 14 years old. The film's editing process took three years, as Sia said she wanted it to be "the best movie it could be". She told Rolling Stone Australia: "The making of the movie was fun but the editing portion actually made me sick. I had an illness and severe pain", and "I couldn't seem to find the right editor – someone who understood the magic I was trying to make happen."

== Soundtrack and album ==
Sia wrote 10 original songs for the soundtrack of Music. The performances of the songs in the film are shared by the three principal cast members (Hudson, Odom Jr. and Ziegler). A full cast version of the soundtrack was originally expected to be released through Atlantic, but it was never released.

Some of the songs written for the film, but sung by Sia, are featured on Sia's ninth studio album, Music – Songs from and Inspired by the Motion Picture, which was released by Monkey Puzzle and Atlantic alongside the film in February 2021. The album also includes material inspired by the film. The album was nominated for the 2021 ARIA Award for Best Original Soundtrack, Cast or Show Album.

Sia released "Together", the song used in the film's final scene, as the lead single from her album on May 20, 2020. A second single, "Courage to Change", the song used over the film's closing credits, was released on September 24, 2020. A clip of Hudson singing the song "1+1" exclusively aired on the MTV Movie and TV Awards: Greatest of All Time on December 6, 2020. "Music", also performed by Hudson, was released alongside the accompanying film scene on January 26, 2021. "Beautiful Things Can Happen", performed by Leslie Odom Jr., from the film, was released on February 2, 2021, and the full "1+1" musical scene was released on YouTube alongside Sia's album on February 12.

=== Musical numbers ===
Throughout the film, the title character "sees the world as pastel dance daydreams" that are executed by Ziegler, Hudson and Odom. Musical numbers and performers listed in the closing credits:

- "Oh Body" (performed by Maddie Ziegler)
- "Best Friend" (performed by Ziegler)
- "1+1" (performed by Kate Hudson)
- "Insecure" (performed by Hudson and Leslie Odom Jr.)
- "Music" (apartment duet; performed by Hudson and Odom)
- "Beautiful Things Can Happen" (performed by Odom)
- "Could I Love with No Fear" (performed by Hudson and Ziegler)
- "Easy" (performed by Hudson)
- "Music" (performed by Hudson)
- "Mountains" (performed by Hudson and Odom)
- "Music" (wedding trio; performed by Ziegler, Hudson and Odom)
- "Together" (performed by Sia)
- "Courage to Change" (closing credits song; performed by Sia)

== Release ==
Sia stated in May 2019 that the film was set for release in October of that year. As of July 2020, it was expected to be released by IMAX after Tenet, later in 2020, but was further delayed to early 2021. In October 2020, the film's producers announced that HanWay Films were to handle global sales, distribution and marketing. A teaser trailer was released by Sia on November 19, 2020, and the US trailer was released on January 15, 2021, by distributor Vertical Entertainment.

Music was released in Australia on January 14, 2021, by StudioCanal. In the United States, it was released in select IMAX theatres for one night on February 10, 2021, and was followed by a premium video on demand release across the country on February 12. It was released in various other markets throughout February 2021. The film was also released on DVD and Blu-ray by distributors in select regions in March 2021.

== Reception ==
=== Box office ===
In Australia, Music grossed $286,000 through its first weekend of release, and $446,000 in its first full week.

Upon its video on demand release in the United States, IndieWire reported that the film was "showing little initial interest despite its $6.99 price."

=== Critical response ===
On the review aggregator website Rotten Tomatoes, Music has an approval rating of 7% based on 55 reviews, with an average rating of 3.5/10. The website's critics consensus reads, "Offensive in its depiction of autism—and painfully misguided in essentially every respect—Music is a vanity project that begs to be turned down." According to Metacritic, which assigned the film a weighted average score of 23 out of 100 based on 18 critics, Music received "generally unfavorable reviews".

Tom Breihan of Stereogum wrote that "Critics hate this thing" and noted the criticism of the casting of Ziegler. Jake Wilson of The Sydney Morning Herald called the film "scarcely less of a baffling fiasco" than Tom Hooper's Cats, that "leaves you wondering what anyone was thinking" and said the casting of Ziegler as an autistic girl is "self-evidently problematic" in the 2020s. James Croot of Stuff also compared Music to Cats, and wrote that the "characters are one-dimensional" and that "an inexplicable cameo from Sia herself is simply bizarre". Stephen Russell of Time Out stated that Music is "a well-intentioned but messily fantastical neurodiversity drama", giving it 2 out of 5 stars and comparing it to Rain Man. Charlotte O'Sullivan, writing for the Evening Standard, gave the same rating and criticised the film, describing it as a "crass and lazy mess". Kevin Maher, writing for The Times, gave the film 2 out of 5 stars, describing the film as a "hodgepodge head-wrecker" and questioning its Golden Globe nominations. He did, however, praise the soundtrack. Johnny Oleksinski, writing for the New York Post, called the film "unwatchable and offensive", giving it 0 out of 5 stars, saying that "Sia should leave the director's chair behind".

Teo Bugbee of The New York Times called Music a "cringeworthy drama", saying that the film "reduces disability to mannerisms that look indistinguishable from mockery." Lucy Rutherford of PerthNow accused the film of being "tone deaf", and wrote that the narrative flow being "interrupted by an album's worth of Sia music videos gets old very quickly". She also commented that the musical sequences "are not a replacement for giving Music a genuine point of view". Tim Robey of The Daily Telegraph also gave the film 2 out of 5 stars, describing it as a "poorly judged, [...] fitfully peppy mess". Vanity Fair's Richard Lawson wrote that Music is a "messy" and "misguided" film. He described the songs as "pleasant" but criticised the choreography. Tim Grierson of Screen Daily penned that the film was executed "naive[ly]". Writing for Slate, Sara Luterman said that she felt "acute discomfort of watching [Ziegler] clumsily ape disability" and comments that "despite the movie's eponymous title", Music is more about Zu than the titular character. Multiple reviews noted parallels between Music and the 2008 film Tropic Thunder starring Ben Stiller as, in Matthew Rozsa of Salon's words, "an actor who tries to win an Oscar by playing a mentally disabled person and fails because his performance is so over-the-top way that it becomes cringe-y rather than compelling."

Luke Buckmaster of The Guardian gave the film 2 out of 5 stars and wrote it "lacks credibility", with Ziegler's "distracting" performance feeling "ill-judged at best". He also penned that it is, in effect, "two very different films with wildly disparate tones" stuck together poorly. Clem Bastow, writing for the same publication, criticized Music's portrayal of autism, stating that it used "abject stereotypes", and noting that Ziegler's performance as the title character is the "standout disaster, serving us 'autism' the Rain Man way." She further wrote that "Music manages to both underestimate autistic people and infantilise them." Bastow also raises concerns about the portrayal of a potentially deadly prone restraint displayed in the film. In a negative review, Dalia Maeroff of The Pitt News wrote that the "bright flashing lights and colors featured throughout the movie make it unwatchable for the very people this movie was made for — people with autism, many of whom have epilepsy." Matt Zoller Seitz for RogerEbert.com wrote that "the film seems to be going for a gritty-yet-also-magical-and-empowering vibe" which lacked common sense and felt insincere and hollow even with its artistry and compassion.

Some critics, however, were more appreciative of the film. Andrew McMillen of The Australian praised Music, writing that it is a "portrait of autism in all its inward splendour and outward challenges". He also commended Ziegler's portrayal of the title character, describing her performance as "moving, singular and perfectly pitched" and as "one of the most moving, magnetic and complete performances in recent memory". Mark Morellini of Star Observer wrote that the film is "a joy to watch", and also applauded Ziegler's performance, describing it as "realistic and emotionally charged". Rachael Mead, writing for InDaily, described the musical interludes as "both visually stunning and musically stunning". Shirley Halperin of Variety described the film as an "exceptional" one "filled with music and visual splendour with heart at its core", and said that the long wait for the film's release "was well worth [it]". Alex Clement, writing for British website HeyUGuys, commended the film, writing that it is a "beautiful piece of art" and a "great accomplishment for a first time director." Clement also praised the musical sequences, describing them as "colourful, vibrant and wild". Tara Brady of The Irish Times said that Ziegler's performance is the "best thing" about the film, and praised the fact that it acknowledges autistic people "can be remarkable without having remarkable abilities", unlike in other films. David Fear, writing for Rolling Stone, wrote that the film painted the "world as pastel dance daydreams, one part Busby Berkeley, one part Daft Punk's 'Around the World', and one part Yo Gabba Gabba!", adding that you have to admire Sia's intentions, but stating the gap between that and the result is "Grand Canyon-esque". The Independent's Adam White wrote similarly of the film, saying that it is "undeniably well-intentioned", but, at the same time, "a total disaster".

=== Criticism from the autistic community ===
Several months before the film was released, after the teaser trailer was released, Sia received criticism for casting Ziegler (who is neurotypical) as an autistic girl in Music. On February 4, 2021, Sia acknowledged criticism of the film from some members of the autistic community and issued an apology on Twitter. In response to criticism that the film's depiction of a physical restraint is potentially dangerous, Sia announced that future screenings would be preceded by a warning and would have the scenes involving restraints removed. However, upon release, it was reported that the film was not recut and was released without a warning. The BBC's Drew Miller Hyndman wrote that "for many in the autistic community, Sia's apology is being seen as too little too late". Helen Brown of The Independent argued that the film's depiction of the restraint could be dangerous, as neurotypical people may come away thinking it is acceptable to "crush" an autistic person when they are having a meltdown. Hudson, while appearing on Jimmy Kimmel Live!, commented that she believes the depiction of autism "is an important conversation to have – not just about [Music], but as a whole about representation". Sia stated that, prior to the film's release, the Child Mind Institute had given Ziegler's portrayal of an autistic character a 100 percent approval rating.

The Autistic Self Advocacy Network (ASAN), the Alliance Against Seclusion and Restraint, and CommunicationFIRST, in a joint press release, declared the use of the restraints to be dangerous after the "movie team [failed] to address recommendations to protect autistic people", and called for Sia to cancel the film. Danish autism advocate Nina Skov Jensen started a Change.org petition calling for the film's Golden Globe nominations to be rescinded, which had received over 140,000 signatures as of March 16, 2021. Jill Escher, the president of the National Council on Severe Autism, however, defended Sia, writing that the denunciation of her over casting choices was unreasonable and harmed the arts and the autism community. The organization also published a letter from an autistic fan titled "Thank You for Representing a Girl with Severe Autism".

=== Accolades ===
| Award | Date of ceremony | Category | Recipient(s) | Result | Ref. |
|---|---|---|---|---|---|
| Golden Globe Awards | February 28, 2021 | Best Motion Picture – Musical or Comedy | Music | Nominated | |
| Golden Globe Awards | February 28, 2021 | Best Actress in a Motion Picture – Musical or Comedy | Kate Hudson | Nominated | |
| Golden Raspberry Awards | April 24, 2021 | Worst Picture | Sia and Vincent Landay | Nominated | |
| Golden Raspberry Awards | April 24, 2021 | Worst Director | Sia | Won | |
| Golden Raspberry Awards | April 24, 2021 | Worst Actress | Kate Hudson | Won | |
| Golden Raspberry Awards | April 24, 2021 | Worst Supporting Actress | Maddie Ziegler | Won | |
