= Let's Love (David Guetta and Sia song) =

2020 single by David Guetta and Sia

Single by David Guetta and Sia
- Released: 11 September 2020
- Genre: Synth-pop; synthwave; new wave
- Length: 3:20
- Label: Parlophone
- Songwriters: David Guetta; Giorgio Tuinfort; Marcus van Wattum; Sia Furler
- Producers: David Guetta; Giorgio Tuinfort; Marcus van Wattum

David Guetta singles chronology
"Pa' La Cultura" (2020)	"Let's Love" (2020)	"Save My Life" (2020)

Sia singles chronology
"Exhale" (2020)	"Let's Love" (2020)	"Courage to Change" (2020)

Music video
- "Let's Love" on YouTube

"Let's Love" is a song by French DJ David Guetta and Australian singer-songwriter Sia. It was released as a single on 11 September 2020 through Parlophone. The song was written by Guetta, Giorgio Tuinfort, Marcus van Wattum and Sia.

At the APRA Music Awards of 2022, the song was nominated for Most Performed Dance/Electronic Work.

== Background ==
David Guetta previously collaborated with Sia on the singles "Titanium", "She Wolf (Falling to Pieces)", "Bang My Head", "Helium" and "Flames". Guetta revealed he was in Miami during the COVID-19 pandemic when he texted Sia and asked if she wanted to "save the world with a happy record and go against the trend". He originally sent Sia piano chords, on which Sia recorded vocals and sent him back a ballad. Guetta wanted the track to feel "happier", and turned it into an '80s synth-pop track. Guetta told Forbes that Pat Benatar, liked by both Sia and himself, was a big influence for "Let's Love".

The single was announced on 27 August 2020 through Guetta's social media platforms, and made available for pre-save on streaming platforms. The track was previewed on TikTok prior to release; Guetta added a statement, saying; "What I love is being in the studio and making music, especially here in Ibiza. Tell me what you love. Tell me what you love, show me what you love. Send me your videos, anything you're passion about. I think life is nothing without a passion and I want us to celebrate life together". Regarding the song release, Guetta stated that "during this time of isolation, I've been incredibly inspired to release music that has an uplifting energy".

== Composition and reception ==
"Let's Love" is a synth-pop, synthwave and new wave song with '80s influences. It was written by David Guetta, Giorgio Tuinfort, Marcus van Wattum and Sia in the key of D minor. Sia's vocals in the song span a range of F_{3} to D_{5}.

Ben Kaye of Consequence of Sound described the song as "an uplifting '80s banger" with "a slapping '80s beat that's a few electronic note removed from Sing Street". The Official Charts Company also described "Let's Love" as a track with "glimmering synths and an uplifting tempo that juxtapose the trap, alternative, and emo-rap landscape of 2020 in music." Various journalists also noted the track's similarity to Pat Benatar's "Love Is a Battlefield".

== Track listings ==
- Digital download and streaming
1. "Let's Love" – 3:20
- Digital download and streaming – David Guetta & MORTEN Future Rave Remix
1. "Let's Love" (David Guetta & MORTEN Future Rave Remix) – 3:42
2. "Let's Love" (David Guetta & MORTEN Future Rave Remix) [Extended] – 4:39
- Digital download and streaming – Cesqeaux Remix
1. "Let's Love" (Cesqeaux Remix) – 3:26
2. "Let's Love" (Cesqeaux Remix) [Extended] – 4:00
- Digital download and streaming – Robin Schulz Remix
1. "Let's Love" (Robin Schulz Remix) – 2:52
2. "Let's Love" (Robin Schulz Remix) [Extended] – 4:13
- Digital download and streaming – Acoustic
1. "Let's Love" (Acoustic) – 3:25
2. "Let's Love" – 3:20
- Digital download and streaming – Vintage Culture, Fancy Inc Remix
1. "Let's Love" (Vintage Culture, Fancy Inc Remix) – 3:40
2. "Let's Love" (Vintage Culture, Fancy Inc Remix) [Extended] – 5:26
- Digital download and streaming – DJs from Mars Remix
1. "Let's Love" (DJs from Mars Remix) – 3:10
2. "Let's Love" (DJs from Mars Remix) [Extended] – 4:21
- Digital download and streaming – Aazar Remix
1. "Let's Love" (Aazar Remix) – 4:02

== Personnel ==
Credits adapted from Tidal.

- David Guetta – production, instruments, programming
- Sia Furler – lead vocals
- Giorgio Tuinfort – production, instruments, piano, programming
- Marcus van Wattum – production, instruments, programming
- Marcel Schimscheimer – bass
- Pierre-Luc Rioux – guitar
- Peppe Folliero – mastering, mixing

== Charts ==
=== Weekly charts ===
Chart (2020–2021)	Peak position
Argentina Hot 100 (Billboard)	59
Australia (ARIA)	94
Australia Digital Song Sales (Billboard)	6
Austria (Ö3 Austria Top 40)	56
Belgium (Ultratop 50 Flanders)	15
Belgium (Ultratop 50 Wallonia)	2
CIS Airplay (TopHit)	6
Croatia Airplay (HRT)	1
Czech Republic Airplay (ČNS IFPI)	37
France (SNEP)	47
Germany (GfK)	30
Germany Airplay (BVMI)	1
Global 200 (Billboard)	106
Hungary (Dance Top 40)	15
Hungary (Rádiós Top 40)	8
Hungary (Single Top 40)	9
Iceland (Tónlistinn)	22
Israel (Media Forest)	1
Italy (FIMI)	45
Mexico Airplay (Billboard)	1
Netherlands (Dutch Top 40)	7
Netherlands (Single Top 100)	37
Poland Airplay (ZPAV)	18
Romania (Airplay 100)	95
Russia Airplay (TopHit)	3
San Marino (SMRRTV Top 50)	4
Scottish Singles Sales (Official Charts)	7
Slovakia Airplay (ČNS IFPI)	15
Slovenia (SloTop50)	2
Switzerland (Schweizer Hitparade)	47
Ukraine Airplay (TopHit)	44
UK Singles (Official Charts)	53
US Hot Dance/Electronic Songs (Billboard)	9

=== Year-end charts ===
Chart (2020)	Position
Belgium (Ultratop Wallonia)	94
CIS (TopHit)	73
Hungary (Dance Top 40)	93
Netherlands (Airplay Top 50)	43
Netherlands (Dutch Top 40)	38
Russia Airplay (TopHit)	81
US Hot Dance/Electronic Songs (Billboard)	79

Chart (2021)	Position
Belgium (Ultratop Flanders)	98
Belgium (Ultratop Wallonia)	56
CIS (TopHit)	60
Hungary (Dance Top 40)	56
Hungary (Rádiós Top 40)	35
Hungary (Single Top 40)	92
Netherlands (Airplay Top 50)	44
Netherlands (Dutch Top 40)	78
Russia Airplay (TopHit)	66
US Hot Dance/Electronic Songs (Billboard)	79

Chart (2022)	Position
Hungary (Dance Top 40)	62

Chart (2023)	Position
Hungary (Dance Top 40)	97

== Certifications ==
Region	Certification	Certified units/sales
Belgium (BRMA)	Gold	20,000^{‡}
France (SNEP)	Platinum	200,000^{‡}
Italy (FIMI)	Platinum	70,000^{‡}
Poland (ZPAV)	Platinum	50,000^{‡}
Portugal (AFP)	Gold	5,000^{‡}
Spain (Promusicae)	Gold	30,000^{‡}
Switzerland (IFPI Switzerland)	Platinum	20,000^{‡}
^{‡} Sales+streaming figures based on certification alone.

== Release history ==
Region	Date	Format	Version	Label	Ref.
Various	11 September 2020	Digital download; streaming	Original	Parlophone	
Australia	11 September 2020	Contemporary hit radio	Original	Warner Music Australia	
Italy	18 September 2020	Contemporary hit radio	Original	Warner	
United Kingdom	26 September 2020	Adult contemporary radio	Original	Parlophone	
Various	23 October 2020	Digital download; streaming	David Guetta & MORTEN Remixes	Parlophone	
Various	30 October 2020	Digital download; streaming	Cesqeaux Remixes	Parlophone	
United States	3 November 2020	Contemporary hit radio	Original	Warner Records	
Various	6 November 2020	Digital download; streaming	Robin Schulz Remixes	Parlophone	
Various	20 November 2020	Digital download; streaming	Acoustic	Parlophone	
Various	27 November 2020	Digital download; streaming	Vintage Culture, Fancy Inc Remixes	Parlophone	
Various	11 December 2020	Digital download; streaming	DJs from Mars Remixes	Parlophone	
Various	12 February 2021	Digital download; streaming	Aazar Remix	Parlophone	

== See also ==
- List of Billboard number-one dance songs of 2020
