= Stella (Norwegian magazine) =

Norwegian women's magazine

- Editor: Lene Vintervoll
- Categories: Women's lifestyle, fashion, health and fitness
- Frequency: Monthly
- Publisher: Bonnier Media
- Founded: 2011
- First issue: 14 March 2011
- Country: Norway
- Based in: Oslo
- Language: Norwegian
- Website: stellamagasinet.no (online edition)

Stella is a monthly Norwegian women's lifestyle magazine published by Bonnier Media which was launched on 14 March 2011. Its tagline is Indre styrke, ytre stil (inner strength, outstanding style) and its main focus is on beauty, health, fashion, and lifestyle.

The editor is Lene Vintervoll, who has extensive experience at Dagbladet and Dagens Næringsliv.

The first issue of Stella had Mia Hundvin on the cover, and the interview with her led to considerable publicity. Stella always features well known Norwegian women on the cover, and the cover interviews are often news in other media.

The first issue, dated April 2011, had a print run of 130,000. Almost 5,000 copies were sold, a very successful launch for the market. Stella has been Bonnier's main focus since its launch. There is also an online edition, which was launched on 10 March 2011. This has the same editorial team, at Øvre Vollgate 6 in central Oslo.

Since the magazine's inception, Sigrid Bonde Tusvik has been a regular columnist, Annema Refsnes the regular fitness expert and psychologist Cathrine Moestue the regular expert on psychology.
