= Together (Sia song) =

Single by Sia

from the album Music – Songs from and Inspired by the Motion Picture
- Released: 20 May 2020
- Studio: Conway (Los Angeles); Electric Lady (New York City); The Rib Cage (Los Angeles)
- Genre: Pop
- Length: 3:25
- Label: Monkey Puzzle; Atlantic
- Songwriters: Sia Furler; Jack Antonoff
- Producers: Jack Antonoff; Jesse Shatkin

Sia singles chronology
"Saved My Life" (2020)	"Together" (2020)	"Exhale" (2020)

Music video
- "Together" on YouTube

"Together" is a song by Australian singer-songwriter Sia from the motion picture soundtrack of the musical film Music, co-written and directed by herself. It was released on 20 May 2020, by Atlantic Records. It is also the lead single from Sia's ninth studio album, Music – Songs from and Inspired by the Motion Picture (2021).

== Background ==
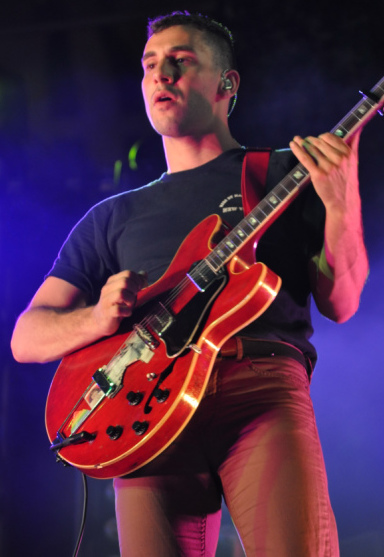
Song co-writer and producer Jack Antonoff in 2012.

The song was first mentioned by Sia in a 2018 interview with Rolling Stone, where it was described as a "cheerful song that matches her personality much more than, say, "Chandelier"." It is the end title of the film Music, which was written and directed by Sia herself. Although Music was not a musical originally, Sia told Rolling Stone that she would be given "roughly $10 million more" to make it a musical film. Music was released in February 2021, along with Sia's album Music – Songs from and Inspired by the Motion Picture.

On 11 May 2020, "Together" was made available for pre-save on Spotify and Apple Music through the website wecantakeithigher. Sia announced the release of the single through her social media accounts on 13 May.

The song was written by Sia and American record producer Jack Antonoff. It was produced by Antonoff, with additional production by Sia's frequent collaborator, Jesse Shatkin. Antonoff was nominated for Producer of the Year, Non-Classical at the 63rd Annual Grammy Awards for his work on the track.

"Together" was featured in an advert for American retail chain Target.

== Release and music video ==
The music video to the song was released on 20 May with the single. The video stars Music's three principal cast members, Maddie Ziegler, Kate Hudson and Leslie Odom Jr, with a troupe of dancing children, wearing outfits themed after clouds and rainbows. A one-take visual, it sees Ziegler leading a high-energy dance around a technicolour room, dressed as a "praying" emoji, and Hudson as a "peace hand" emoji.

"Together" was released to adult contemporary radio in the United Kingdom on 30 May 2020 and in the United States on 29 June.

The F9 radio and club remixes were released for download and streaming on 10 July 2020, followed by the Initial Talk remix on 24 July. An "80s bootleg music video" for the Initial Talk remix was released on 30 July 2020. It has clips from Sia's previous music videos.

== Commercial performance ==
"Together" saw fair commercial success in Australia, Sia's home country. It peaked at number 27 on the ARIA Singles Chart there, and reached number 1 on The Music Network's Hot 100, which tracks weekly radio spins of singles in Australia, becoming Sia's first solo number 1 on the chart.

In the UK, "Together" debuted and peaked at number 96 on the UK Singles Chart dated 4 June 2020. Following substantial hot adult contemporary airplay in the US, "Together" peaked at number 11 on the Billboard Adult Top 40 chart.

== Track listing ==
Digital download and streaming

1. "Together" – 3:25

Digital download and streaming (F9 Remixes)

1. "Together" (F9 Radio Remix) – 3:20
2. "Together" – 3:25
3. "Together" (F9 Club Remix) – 7:49

Digital download and streaming (Initial Talk Remix)

1. "Together" (Initial Talk Remix) – 3:18

== Credits and personnel ==
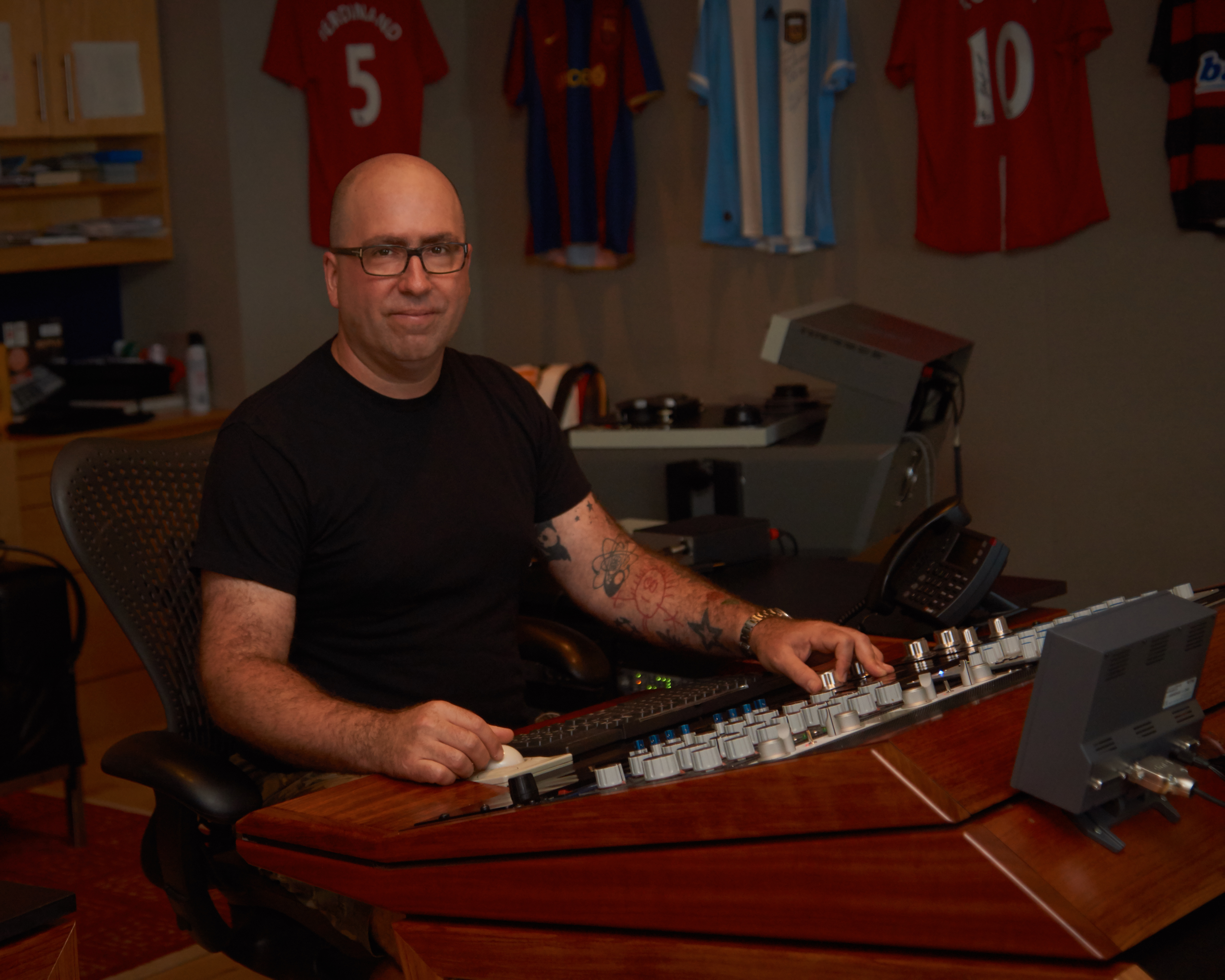
Chris Gehringer served as the track's mastering engineer.

Credits adapted from Tidal.

- Sia Furler – writer, vocals
- Jack Antonoff – writer, producer, background vocals, drums, keyboards, piano, programming, synthesizer
- Jesse Shatkin – additional production, additional programming, bass guitar, drum programming, keyboards, synthesizer, engineer
- Laura Sisk – engineer
- Sam Dent – additional engineer
- John Rooney – assistant engineer
- Jon Sher – assistant engineer
- Serban Ghenea – mixer
- John Hanes – mixing engineer
- Chris Gehringer – masterer

== Charts ==
=== Weekly charts ===
Chart (2020)	Peak position
Australia (ARIA)	27
Belgium (Ultratop 50 Wallonia)	23
Canada Hot 100 (Billboard)	70
Canada AC (Billboard)	36
Canada CHR/Top 40 (Billboard)	34
Canada Hot AC (Billboard)	29
France (SNEP)	161
Hungary (Single Top 40)	27
New Zealand Hot Singles (RMNZ)	10
Scotland Singles (OCC)	56
Slovakia Singles Digital (ČNS IFPI)	54
Slovenia (SloTop50)	48
Switzerland (Schweizer Hitparade)	61
UK Singles (OCC)	96
US Adult Pop Airplay (Billboard)	11
US Pop Airplay (Billboard)	39

=== Year-end charts ===
Chart (2020)	Position
Australian Artist (ARIA)	11
US Adult Top 40 (Billboard)	40

== Certifications ==
Region	Certification	Certified units/sales
Austria (IFPI Austria)	Gold	15,000^{‡}
Canada (Music Canada)	Gold	40,000^{‡}
New Zealand (RMNZ)	Gold	15,000^{‡}
^{‡} Sales+streaming figures based on certification alone.

== Release history ==
Region	Date	Format	Version	Label(s)	Ref.
Various	20 May 2020	Digital download; streaming	Original	Monkey Puzzle; Atlantic	
Italy	22 May 2020	Contemporary hit radio	Original	Warner	
United Kingdom	30 May 2020	Adult contemporary radio	Original	Atlantic	
United States	29 June 2020	Adult contemporary radio	Original	Elektra	
Various	10 July 2020	Digital download; streaming	F9 remixes	Monkey Puzzle; Atlantic	
Various	24 July 2020	Digital download; streaming	Initial Talk remix	Monkey Puzzle; Atlantic	
