= Zero 7 discography =

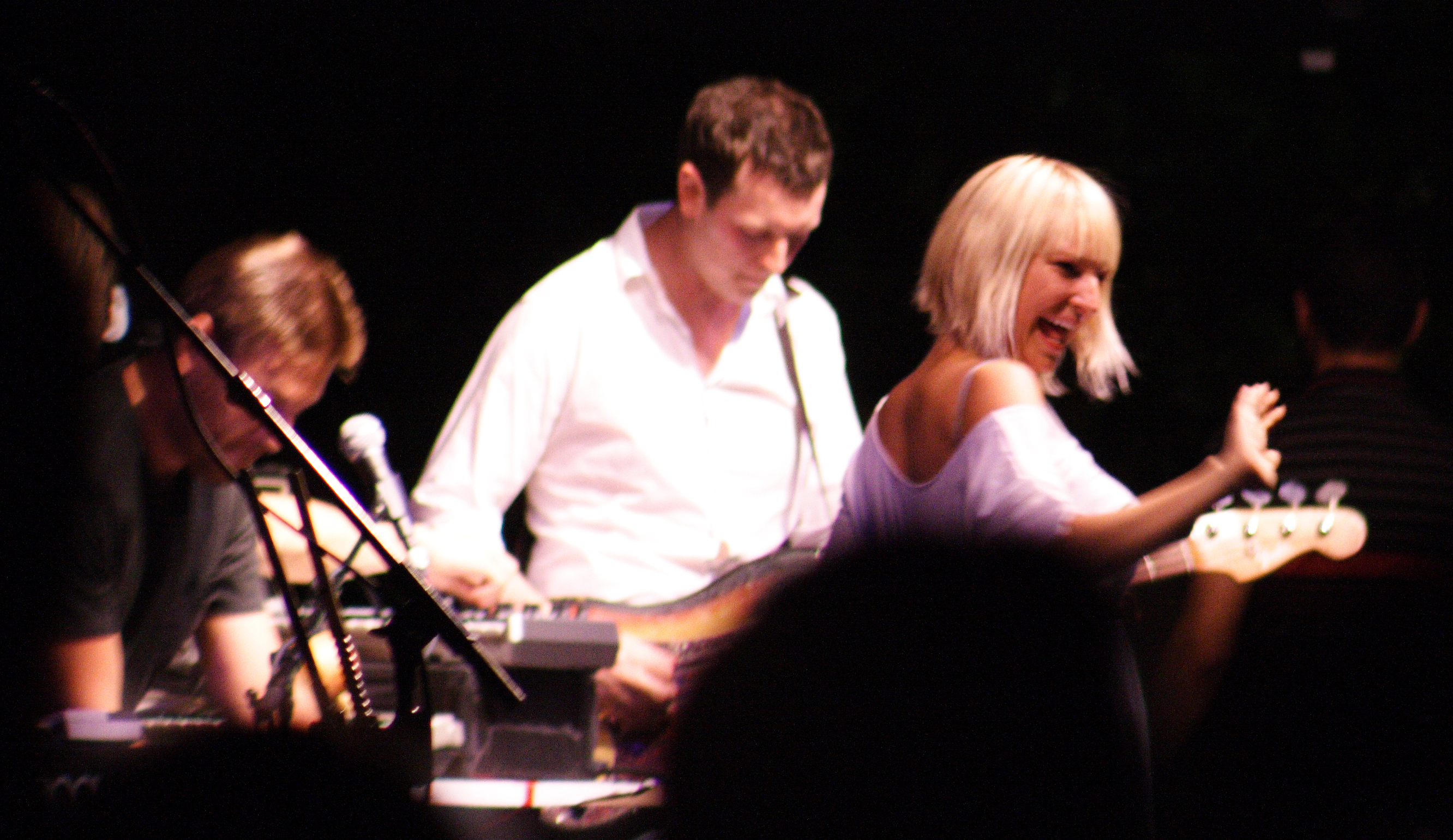
- Zero 7 in concert with Sia
- Studio albums: 4
- Extended plays: 7
- Compilation albums: 4
- Singles: 19

British musical duo Zero 7 has released four studio albums, four compilation and remix albums, seven extended plays and nineteen singles.

== Albums ==
=== Studio albums ===
List of albums, with selected chart positions, sales, and certifications
Title	Album details	Peak chart positions										Certifications
Title	Album details	UK	AUS	FRA	IRE	ITA	NZ	NL	POR	SCO	US	Certifications
Simple Things	Released: 23 April 2001; Label: Ultimate Dilemma/Palm Pictures	28	—	134	—	—	—	—	—	34	— (Note: Simple Things did not enter the US Billboard 200, but peaked at number 20 on the US Heatseekers Albums Chart.)	BPI: Platinum
When It Falls	Released: 1 March 2004; Label: Ultimate Dilemma/Elektra	3	— (Note: When It Falls did not enter the Australian ARIA Albums Chart but peaked at number 12 on the ARIA Hitseekers Chart.)	76	27	24	—	59	10	5	139	BPI: Platinum
The Garden	Released: 22 May 2006; Label: Atlantic	4	81	128	29	52	30	87	—	6	94	BPI: Gold
Yeah Ghost	Released: 28 September 2009; Label: Atlantic	39	—	—	—	—	—	—	—	65	142	
"—" denotes a recording that did not chart or was not released in that territory.

=== Remixes and compilations ===
List of remix and compilation albums, with selected chart positions
Title	Album details	Peak chart positions			
Title	Album details	UK	UK Dance	SCO	US Dance
Another Late Night: Zero 7	Released: 18 February 2002; Label: Azuli, Kinetic	—	—	—	16
Simple Things Remixes	Released: 21 January 2003; Label: Palm	—	—	—	—
The Garden Exclusives	Released: 6 June 2006; Label: Warner	—	—	—	—
Record	Released: 28 June 2010; Label: New State	61	10	90	22
"—" denotes a recording that did not chart or was not released in that territory.

== EPs ==
List of EPs, with selected chart positions
Title	Album details	Peak chart positions		
Title	Album details	UK Sales	UK Indie	US Dance
EP 1	Released: 24 January 2000; Label: Ultimate Dilemma	—	—	—
EP 2	Released: 20 November 2000; Label: Ultimate Dilemma	—	37	—
In the Waiting Line	Released: March 18, 2001; Label: New State Music	—	—	—
Introducing... Zero 7	Released: 19 May 2008; Label: New State Music	—	—	—
Simple Science	Released: 18 August 2014; Label: Make	—	—	—
EP 3	Released: 14 April 2015; Label: Make	43	—	15
Shadows	Released: 23 October 2020; Label: Make	—	—	—
"—" denotes a recording that did not chart or was not released in that territory.

== Singles ==
List of singles, with selected chart positions and certifications, showing year released and album name
Title	Year	Peak chart positions									Certifications	Album
Title	Year	UK	UK Dance	UK Indie	CIS	EUR	RUS	SCO	UKR	US AAA	Certifications	Album
"I Have Seen" (featuring Mozez)	2001	76	18	9	—	—	—	—	—	—		Simple Things
"Destiny" (featuring Sophie Barker and Sia)	2001	30	—	2	—	99	—	35	—	26	BPI: Silver	Simple Things
"End Theme"	2001	117	—	17	—	—	—	—	—	—		Simple Things
"In the Waiting Line" (featuring Sophie Barker)	2001	47	30	6	—	—	—	67	—	—	BPI: Silver	Simple Things
"Truth & Rights"	2002	141	—	—	—	—	—	—	—	—		Another Late Night
"Distractions" (featuring Sia)	2002	45	37	5	—	—	—	58	—	—		Simple Things
"Home" (featuring Tina Dickow)	2004	— (Note: "Home" did not enter the UK Singles Chart, but peaked at number 33 on the UK Physical Singles Chart Top 100.)	—	—	190	—	165	—	64	—		When It Falls
"Somersault" (featuring Sia)	2004	56	—	—	—	—	—	72	—	—		When It Falls
"Warm Sound" (featuring Mozez)	2005	—	—	—	—	—	—	—	—	—		When It Falls
"Futures" (featuring José González)	2006	—	—	—	—	—	—	—	—	—		The Garden
"Throw It All Away" (featuring Sia)	2006	—	—	—	—	—	—	—	—	—		The Garden
"You're My Flame" (featuring Sia)	2006	103	—	—	—	—	—	67	—	—		The Garden
"If I Can't Have You" (featuring Sia)	2006	—	—	—	—	—	—	—	—	—		The Garden
"Inaminute"	2006	200	—	—	—	—	—	—	—	—		The Garden
"Medicine Man" (featuring Eska)	2009	—	—	—	—	—	—	—	—	—		Yeah Ghost
"On My Own" / "Don't Call It Love"	2013	— (Note: "On My Own" did not enter the UK Singles Chart, but peaked at number 57 on the UK Physical Singles Chart Top 100.)	—	—	—	—	—	—	—	—		Non-album single
"Simple Science" / "Red Blue and Green"	2014	— (Note: "Simple Science" did not enter the UK Singles Chart, but peaked at number 89 on the UK Physical Singles Chart Top 100.)	—	—	—	—	—	—	—	—		Simple Science
"Take Me Away" / "U Know"	2014	— (Note: "Take Me Away" did not enter the UK Singles Chart, but peaked at number 91 on the UK Physical Singles Chart Top 100.)	—	—	—	—	—	—	—	—		Simple Science
"Mono" (featuring Hidden)	2018	—	—	—	—	—	—	—	—	—		Non-album singles
"Aurora" (featuring José González)	2019	—	—	—	—	—	—	—	—	—		Non-album singles
"Swimmers" (featuring Jem Cooke)	2019	—	—	—	—	—	—	—	—	—		Non-album singles
"—" denotes a recording that did not chart or was not released in that territory.

== Music videos ==
Year	Title	Director	Album
2001	"I Have Seen"	Garth Jennings	Simple Things
2001	"Destiny" (Animated version)	Tommy Pallotta	Simple Things
2001	"Destiny" (Alternate version)	Howard Greenhalgh	Simple Things
2001	"In The Waiting Line" (Animated version)	Tommy Pallotta	Simple Things
2001	"In The Waiting Line" (Alternate version)	unknown	Simple Things
2002	"Distractions"	unknown	Simple Things
2004	"Home"	Barney Clay	When It Falls
2004	"Somersault" (Performance version)	unknown	When It Falls
2004	"Somersault" (Alternate version)	unknown	When It Falls
2004	"In Time"	Matthew Leslie Burke	When It Falls
2006	"Futures" (First version)	DuckEye	The Garden
2006	"Futures" (Alternate version)	Robert Seidel	The Garden
2006	"You're My Flame" (First version)	JD Smyth	The Garden
2006	"You're My Flame" (Animated version)	Robert Chandler	The Garden
2006	"Throw It All Away" (First version)	Daniel Ackerman	The Garden
2006	"Throw It All Away" (Alternate version)	unknown	The Garden
2006	"Crosses"	DuckEye	The Garden
2006	"Left Behind" (First version)	Adam Bizanski	The Garden
2006	"Left Behind" (Alternate version)	Neil Coxhill	The Garden
2006	"This Fine Social Scene"	Kit Fraser	The Garden
2006	"Seeing Things"	unknown	The Garden
2009	"Everything Up (Zizou)" (Joker & Ginz remix)	Future Power Station	Yeah Ghost
2018	"Mono"	Julian House	non-album single
2019	"Swimmers"	Natasha Dettman	non-album single

== Soundtracks, compilations and media appearances ==
Simple Things (2001)

Song	Appearance(s)
"I Have Seen"	Shortland Street 2010 promo
"Polaris"	Sex and the City
"Destiny"	Blue Crush; Raising Helen; I'm With Lucy/; Lacoste website; The O.C.; Roswell; True Life; Obsessed; "Destiny (Hefner's Destiny's Chill)"; The Chillout Project; "Destiny (Acoustic Mix)"; Acoustic 3
"Give It Away"	CSI: Crime Scene Investigation
"Distractions"	Six Feet Under; Tracy Beaker Returns
"In the Waiting Line"	2008 Summer Olympics; Sex and the City; House, M.D.; Numb3rs; Scrubs; Garden State (can be found on the Garden State soundtrack); "In the Waiting Line (Dorfmeister Con Madrid De Los Austrias Dub)"; Confidence
"This World"	Snowpiercer
"End Theme"	CSI: Crime Scene Investigation

When It Falls (2004)

Song	Appearance(s)
"Warm Sound"	West Wing - S05E018 - Access
"Home"	Ministry of Sound Chillout Sessions 5
"Somersault"	Guess Who; The O.C.; Annapolis; "Somersault (Danger Mouse Mix)"; Entourage (U.S. TV series)
"Passing By"	The O.C.
"When It Falls"	The West Wing
"Look Up"	Goal!

The Garden (2006)

Song	Appearance(s)
"Throw It All Away"	Studio 60 on the Sunset Strip
"The Pageant of the Bizarre"	The O.C.; Warren Miller's Off The Grid
"Today"	The Boys and Girls Guide to Getting Down
"Waiting to Die"	The O.C.

Remixes/Covers

- "Truth and Rights"
  - Another Late Night (later Late Night Tales)
    - Another Late Night: Zero 7 (2002)
- "To Ulrike M. (Zero 7 Mix)"
  - Hôtel Costes, Vol. 2: La Suite
- "I Go to Sleep"
  - The Saturday Sessions: The Dermot O'Leary Show (2007 compilation album)

== Remixes by various artists ==
- Distractions (Bugz in the Attic Remix)
- Distractions (Bugz Cooperative Dub)
- Distractions (DJ Spinna Remix)
- Distractions (Version Idjut)
- Distractions (Madlib's YNQ Remix)
- Distractions (Block 16 Remix)
- Destiny (Photek Remix)
- Destiny (Hefner's Destiny's Chill)
- Destiny (Simian Remix)
- End Theme (Roni Size's Tear It Up Remix)
- End Theme (Roni Size's Tear It Down Remix)
- End Theme (Herbert's Unrealised Remix)
- Futures (Metronomy Remix)
- Futures (Block 16 Mix)
- In the Waiting Line (Aquanote's Naked Adaptation)
- In the Waiting Line (Diaspora Mix, Osunlade Instrumental)
- In the Waiting Line (Slide Remix)
- In the Waiting Line (Dorfmeister Con Madrid De Los Austrias Dub)
- In the Waiting Line (Koop Remix)
- In the Waiting Line (S.P.Y. Remix)
- Home (Stereolab Remix)
- Home (Ben Watt Remix)
- Somersault (Yam Who? Mix)
- Somersault (Danger Mouse Remix)
- Somersault (Hot Chip Remix)
- Throw It All Away (Dilla Circulate Mix)
- Today (Pépé Bradock Mix)
- Warm Sound (Remystify Mix)
- Warm Sound (Justin Haylock Mix)
- Warm Sound (inputJunkie Remix)
- You're My Flame (Dabrye Remix)
- You're My Flame (Justus Köhncke Vox Mix)

== Remixes by Zero 7 ==
- To Ulrike M. - Doris Days
- Up With People - Lambchop
- If You Can't Say No - Lenny Kravitz
- Climbing Up The Walls - Radiohead
- Twisty Bass - Neil Finn
- Umi Says - Mos Def
- Low Five - Sneaker Pimps
- Provider - N.E.R.D.
- Love Theme From Spartacus - Terry Callier
- Moon To Let - Tina Dico
- The Absentee - Half Cousin
- Hey Now - London Grammar
- In This Shirt - The Irrepressibles
- Our Song - Ultraísta
- Crush - Hello Skinny
