= Lady Croissant =

2007 live album by Sia

Live album by Sia
- Released: 3 April 2007
- Recorded: 17 April 2006
- Venue: Bowery Ballroom (New York City, New York)
- Length: 40:16
- Label: Astralwerks
- Producer: Dan Carey

Sia chronology
| Colour the Small One (2004) | Lady Croissant (2007) | Some People Have Real Problems (2008) |

Singles from Lady Croissant
- 1. "Pictures" Released: 27 November 2006

Lady Croissant is a live album by Australian singer-songwriter Sia, released in April 2007, through the Astralwerks. It contains one studio recording ("Pictures") as well as eight live tracks recorded during an April 2006 concert at the Bowery Ballroom in New York City. Eight songs were written or co-written by Sia; one of the featured songs is a cover version of Ray Davies's song "I Go to Sleep", a studio recording of which later appeared on Sia's fourth studio album Some People Have Real Problems (2008).

The album was produced by Dan Carey, mixed by Jon Lemon and Taz Mattar at Sarm Studios in London, and mastered by Emily Lazar and Sarah Register at The Lodge in New York City. Lady Croissant received a mixed critical reception and spawned one single, "Pictures", which was released exclusively via American Eagle Outfitters on 27 November 2006.

== Composition ==
Just over forty minutes in length, Lady Croissant contains nine "slow-to-mid-tempo" compositions. The album includes one previously unreleased studio recording called "Pictures", co-written by Dan Carey, along with eight live tracks recorded during her 17 April 2006 performance at the Bowery Ballroom in New York City. "Destiny" and "Distractions" each appeared on Zero 7's 2001 album Simple Things, which featured vocals by Sia. Both songs were co-written by Sia and members of Zero 7; "Destiny" was also co-written by Sophie Barker, another vocal contributor to Simple Things.

"Blow It All Away" originally appeared on Sia's 2002 studio album Healing Is Difficult, and "Don't Bring Me Down", "Numb" and "Breathe Me" were each released on her 2004 album Colour the Small One. "Lentil" and the cover version of Ray Davies' song "I Go to Sleep", made popular by both Cher and the Pretenders, would later appear on Some People Have Real Problems (2008). The album was produced by Carey, mixed by Jon Lemon and Taz Mattar at Sarm Studios in London and mastered by Emily Lazar and Sarah Register at The Lodge in New York City.

== Reception ==
Professional ratings
Review scores
| Source | Rating |
|---|---|
| AllMusic | 3/5 stars |
| DIY | 5.0/10 |
| Gigwise | 4/5 stars |
| Pitchfork | 5.2/10 |
| Popmatters | 4.0/10 |

Lady Croissant received a mixed critical reception. AllMusic's Marisa Brown called Sia's vocal performance "rich and passionate" and compared it to Nelly Furtado and Morley. Brown stated the band was "tight and lush" and that the music was "very modern, warm and melodic and cleanly intricate". In his review for BBC Music, Paul Sullivan wrote that the album successfully displayed Sia's vocal capabilities and versatility. However, he noted the minimal audience participation and felt that this prevented the album from capturing a "live" experience. For Sullivan, highlights included "Don't Bring Me Down", "Destiny", and "Lentil", which he believed were "executed with an appealing mixture of frankness and fluidity". Mark Perlaki of Gigwise awarded the album four out of five stars and opined that the album "portrays an artist who's [sic] star is in the ascendant, whose voice is unrivaled in style and expression, an artist on the brink of deserved and assured greater recognition". The Selby Times' review called the collection "mesmerising" and a good indicator of Sia's future work. One reviewer for WERS called the album "breathtaking" and wrote positively of Sia's vocals and the instrumentation. Like Sullivan, the reviewer warned that listeners expecting a traditional live album with "raw cuts and heavy improvisation" might be disappointed.

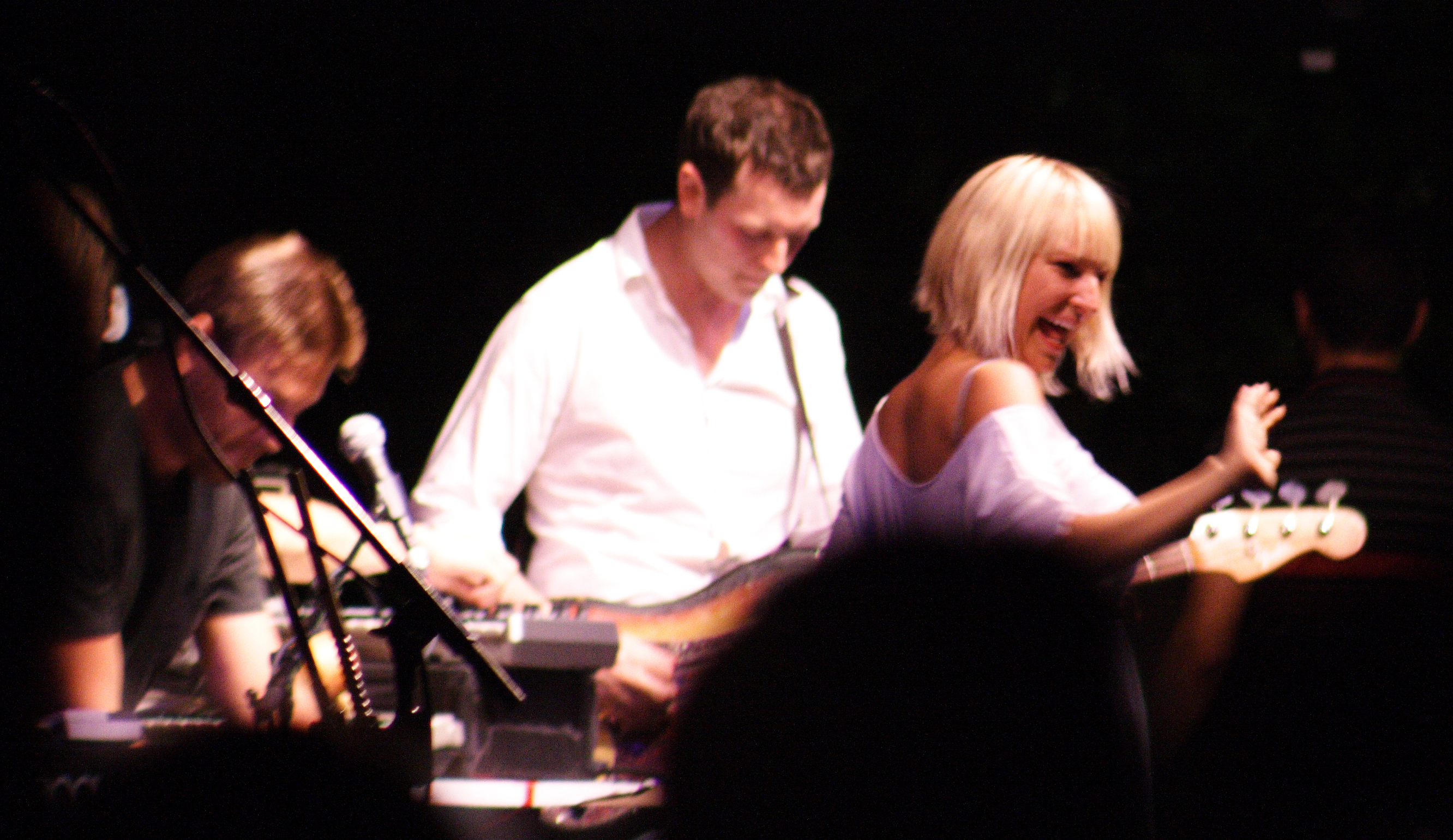
Sia and Zero 7 performing in 2006; Henry Binns and Sam Hardaker of Zero 7 are credited as co-writers for "Destiny" and "Distractions"

Roque Strew of Pitchfork found Sia's Adelaide accent to be a "liability", specifically noting difference in pronunciation between the studio versions of "Destiny" and "Distractions" and the live performances. Strew complimented "Pictures" and "Lentil", the latter of which shined through the "fog of elongated syllables and cut consonants". Popmatters' Mike Schiller felt the instrumentation was "robotic" and found Sia's vocal manipulation and bending of vowels "infuriating", even unintelligible at times. Schiller did, however, favor her vocal tone and found the power of her voice "occasionally transcendent". Stuart McCaighy of DIY appreciated "Pictures" but also criticized Sia's performance for lacking diversity and for "incomprehensible" vocals due to her slurring of words. McCaighy concluded that, like other live albums, Lady Croissant was redundant but would be appreciated by fans. The Australian publication DNA published a mixed review of the album in 2010 following the release of We Are Born, complimenting Sia's vocals but suggesting that "Pictures" sounded like a B-side and that the album's release smells like a "cash-in" on her "recent success".

== Track listing ==
Credits were adapted from AllMusic.

Lady Croissant track listing
| No. | Title | Writer(s) | Length |
|---|---|---|---|
| 1. | "Pictures" (studio recording) | Dan Carey; Sia Furler | 3:37 |
| 2. | "Don't Bring Me Down" | Furler; Blair MacKichan | 4:36 |
| 3. | "Destiny" | Sophie Barker; Henry Binns; Furler; Sam Hardaker | 3:55 |
| 4. | "Blow It All Away" | Kevin Armstrong; Furler; Felix Howard; MacKichan | 5:19 |
| 5. | "Lentil" | Samuel Dixon; Furler | 4:11 |
| 6. | "Numb" | Furler; Howard; James McMillan | 4:26 |
| 7. | "I Go to Sleep" | Ray Davies | 3:17 |
| 8. | "Breathe Me" | Carey; Furler | 5:52 |
| 9. | "Distractions" | Binns; Furler; Hardaker | 5:03 |

== Personnel ==
- Kevin Armstrong – composer
- Sophie Barker – composer
- Henry Binns – composer
- Felix Bloxsom – drums
- Dan Carey – bass, composer, engineer, guitar, keyboards, producer, Wurlitzer
- Robin Danar – assistant engineer
- Ray Davies – composer
- John Dent – mastering
- Samuel Dixon – bass, composer
- Tom Elmhirst – mixing
- Sia Furler – composer, vocals
- José González – photography
- Sam Hardaker – composer
- Felix Howard – composer
- Joe Kennedy – keyboards
- Olliver Kraus – cello
- Emily Lazar – mastering
- Joey Lemon – mixing
- Blair MacKichan – composer
- Taz Mattar – mixing engineer
- James McMillan – composer
- Stephanie Pistel – cover photo, photography
- Sarah Register – mastering
- Michael Sendaydiego – photography
- Gus Seyffert – guitar
- Jeff Tweedy – photography
- Joey Waronker – drums

Credits adapted from AllMusic and CD liner notes.

== Release history ==
| Region | Date | Format(s) | Label | Ref. |
|---|---|---|---|---|
| Australia | 3 April 2007 | Digital download | Astralwerks | |
| United States | 3 April 2007 | CD; digital download | Astralwerks | |
| United Kingdom | 7 May 2007 | CD; digital download | Astralwerks | |

== See also ==
- Music of Adelaide
- Zero 7 discography
