= Record (Zero 7 album) =

Compilation album by Zero 7
- Released: 2010
- Genres: Electronica; downtempo
- Label: Atlantic

Zero 7 chronology
Yeah Ghost (2009)	Record (2010)	Simple Science (2014)

Record, sometimes referred as Record: The Best of Zero 7, is a compilation album by British musical duo Zero 7, released on 28 June 2010. The compilation contains material from the duo's first four studio albums. The deluxe version includes a second disc featuring remixes by such producers as J Dilla, Justus Köhncke and Joker.

== Critical reception ==
Professional ratings
Aggregate scores
Source	Rating
Metacritic	69/100
Review scores
Source	Rating
Allmusic	4/5 stars
Pitchfork Media	(4/10)
PopMatters	(4/10)
Under the Radar	(7/10)

Lily Moayeri of Under the Radar said the album "is all the Zero 7 anyone could ask for—all killer, no filler." Pitchfork Media's Jess Harvell wrote that "the best-of format actually works against Zero 7 by ignoring the non-singles that added, however rarely, some much-needed variety to their albums." Sachyn Mital of PopMatters suggested that the single-disc version is "passable for new listeners", while the deluxe version "might please longtime fans hoping to collect many remixes on one disc."

== Track listing ==
No.	Title	Writer(s)	Vocals	Length
1.	"Futures"	Henry Binns; Sam Hardaker	José González	3:53
2.	"I Have Seen"	Roy Phillips	Mozez	5:04
3.	"You're My Flame"	Binns; Hardaker; Sia Furler	Sia	3:20
4.	"Destiny"	Binns; Hardaker; Sophie Barker; Furler	Sia and Sophie Barker	5:38
5.	"Throw It All Away"	Binns; Hardaker; Furler; Dedi Madden	Sia	5:25
6.	"Polaris"	Binns; Hardaker		4:48
7.	"Everything Up [Zizou]"	Binns; Hardaker; Eska Mtungwazi	Eska	5:19
8.	"Home"	Binns; Hardaker; Tina Dickow; Madden	Tina Dico	4:36
9.	"Mr McGee"	Binns; Hardaker; Rob Gallagher; Mtungwazi	Eska	4:19
10.	"Swing"	Binns; Hardaker; Binki Shapiro	Jackie Daniels	3:57
11.	"Somersault"	Binns; Hardaker; Furler	Sia	6:57
12.	"In The Waiting Line"	Binns; Hardaker; Barker	Sophie Barker	4:32
13.	"The Pageant of the Bizarre"	Binns; Hardaker; Furler	Sia	4:26
14.	"Salt Water Sound"	Binns; Hardaker		5:27
15.	"Distractions"	Binns; Hardaker; Furler	Sia	5:16
16.	"End Theme"	Daryl Runswick		3:38
