= Eska =

Eska may refer to:

- Eska (band) 1990s Glasgow band
- Eska (singer) 2010s singer
  - Eska (album), her debut album
- Eska TV
- Eska Rock
- Eska Water
- Radio Eska, Polish radio network
- Eska Awards
- Joseph F. Eska, linguist Lepontic language
- Gimo Air Base, airport in Gimo, Sweden, with the ICAO code ESKA

== See also ==
- Ezka, a river in the Basque country known as "Esca" in Spanish
