= Simple Things Remixes =

Remix album by Zero 7
- Released: 21 January 2003
- Genre: Electronica; downtempo
- Length: 34:13
- Label: Palm Pictures
- Producer: Madlib; Photek; Roni Size; Bugz in the Attic; Richard Dorfmeister

Zero 7 chronology
Another Late Night: Zero 7 (2002)	Simple Things Remixes (2003)	When It Falls (2004)

Professional ratings
Review scores
Source	Rating
Allmusic	3/5 stars

Simple Things Remixes is a remix album by Zero 7, released only in the United States. It features mixes of tracks from their first album, Simple Things and an enhanced music video for the 2001 single "Destiny".

== Track listing ==
No.	Title	Length
1.	"Distractions" (Bugz in the Attic Remix)	5:35
2.	"In the Waiting Line" (Dorfmeister con Madrid de los Austrias Dub)	6:42
3.	"Destiny" (Photek Remix)	7:13
4.	"Distractions" (Madlib's Ynq Remix)	5:15
5.	"End Theme" (Roni Size's Tear It Up Remix)	9:28
6.	"Destiny" (Music Video)	6:46
