= List of downtempo artists =

This is a list of downtempo artists, a genre of electronic music.

== List ==
- Air
- All India Radio
- The Album Leaf
- Alpha
- Arthur Loves Plastic
- Banco de Gaia
- Bibio
- Bitter:Sweet
- Blank & Jones
- Blue Sky Black Death
- Blue States
- Boards of Canada
- Bohren & der Club of Gore
- Bonobo
- Boozoo Bajou
- Bowery Electric
- Brazilian Girls
- Burial
- Carbon Based Lifeforms
- Catching Flies
- Charles Webster
- Chet Faker
- Chinese Man
- Clara Hill
- Clutchy Hopkins
- Colder
- Continuum
- Craig Armstrong
- Daedelus
- Darkside
- Death In Vegas
- Dave Harrington
- De-Phazz
- D.V.S*
- Dido
- Dntel
- dZihan & Kamien
- Elliott Power
- Emancipator
- Enigma
- Esthero
- Etro Anime
- Fat Jon
- Fila Brazillia
- Flume
- Four Tet
- Funki Porcini
- Frou Frou
- Gaelle
- Geyser
- Global Communication
- Goldfrapp
- Goldfish
- Hallucinogen
- Helicopter Girl
- Hooverphonic
- Ilya
- Jahcoozi
- James Blake
- Jazzanova
- Jazztronik
- Keep Shelly in Athens
- Klaus Waldeck
- Kruder & Dorfmeister
- Kygo
- Lamb
- Late Night Alumni
- Leftfield
- Lemon Jelly
- Liquid Stranger
- Lisa Shaw
- Little Dragon
- Lovage
- Massive Attack
- Matthew Herbert
- Men I Trust
- Mister Lies
- Moby
- Monk & Canatella
- Morcheeba
- MoShang
- Mr. Scruff
- Nicolas Jaar
- Nightmares on Wax
- Nitin Sawhney
- Parov Stelar
- Patrick Wolf
- Pete Namlook
- Portishead
- Pretty Lights
- Quantic
- Rena Jones
- Riad Michael
- Röyksopp
- Rhye
- Saafi Brothers
- Samantha James
- Seelenluft
- Sevdaliza
- Si*Sé
- Sophie Barker
- Soulstice
- St Germain
- Stuart Matthewman
- The Cinematic Orchestra
- Tipper
- Télépopmusik
- Thievery Corporation
- Tommy Guerrero
- Tosca
- Tricky
- Two Loons for Tea
- Tycho
- Ulrich Schnauss
- Vanessa Daou
- Weekend Players
- William Orbit
- Zero 7
