= EP 1 (Zero 7 EP) =

EP by Zero 7
- Released: 24 January 2000
- Genre: Downtempo; trip hop
- Length: 26:19
- Label: Ultimate Dilemma

Zero 7 chronology
EP 1 (2000)	EP 2 (2000)

EP 1, also simply EP, is the first EP released by British downtempo duo Zero 7. The release was limited to 1000 copies.

== Tracks ==
Whilst the A Side tracks are featured on the album Simple Things, the track "Out of Town" differs to the version that appears on the aforementioned album.

The track "Lo" has been featured on a mix CD by Layo & Bushwacka!, and is the reason behind the track being referred to as Lo (Layo and Bushwacka! Remix) in many areas. It is one of the few times the track has actually appeared on CD or in digital form (Lo has since seen release on the Deluxe version of Record). EP1 is the only Zero 7 release that contains the track "One Arm Break".

== Track listing ==
Side A
No.	Title	Length
1.	"Out of Town"	4:55
2.	"This World"	5:35
3.	"Likufanele"	6:11

Side B
No.	Title	Length
1.	"Lo"	4:36
2.	"One Arm Break"	5:00
