= Where I Belong (Sia song) =

Single by Sia

from the album Colour the Small One
- Released: 9 August 2004
- Studio: Heliocentric Studios; Rye, England
- Genre: Downtempo; indie pop; jazz
- Length: 4:44
- Label: Systemtactic; Go! Beat; Astralwerks
- Songwriter(s): Sia Furler; Samuel Dixon
- Producer(s): Jimmy Hogarth

Sia singles chronology
"Somersault" (2004)	"Where I Belong" (2004)	"Numb" (2005)

"Where I Belong" is a song by Australian singer Sia. It was released as the third single from her 2004 album, Colour the Small One in August 2004.

"Where I Belong" was scheduled to be included on the soundtrack for the film Spider-Man 2; however, owing to a record label conflict, it was withdrawn at the last minute. This is referenced in the cover art for the single, which features Sia donning a Spider-Man costume.

== Promotion ==
Sia performed the track on her four UK live summer appearance in 2004:

- 1 July - Lock 17
- 1 August - Big Chill
- 4 August - Supporting Air at Somerset House
- 15 August - Weekender Summer Sundae, Leicester.

== Review ==
In an album review, Daniel Murt of The Guardian listed "Where I Belong" as a stand out tracks alongside "Don't Bring Me Down".

== Charts ==
On 21 August 2004, The song debuted at number 85 on the UK Singles Charts and stayed in the Top 100 for 1 week.

== Track listings ==
1 track Single

1. Where I Belong (Radio Edit) - 4:44

UK CD and digital download

1. Where I Belong - 4:45
2. Where I Belong (Roni Size Remix) - 5:58
3. Where I Belong (Red Astaire Remix) - 6:06
4. Where I Belong (Cookie Remix) - 4:35
5. Where I Belong (Hot Chip Remix) - 5:06
6. Where I Belong (Future Funk Squad Acidic Funk Dub) - 5:52
7. Where I Belong (Roni Size Crush Remix) - 5:32

2008 US Remixes 1

1. Where I Belong (Roni Size Remix) - 6:03
2. Where I Belong (Roni Size Crush Remix) - 5:34

2008 US Remixes 2

1. Where I Belong (Red Astaire Remix) - 6:11
2. Where I Belong (Future Funk Squad "Acidic-Funk" Dub) - 5:55

== Credits and Personnel ==
- Design, Art Direction – Blue Source
- Drums – Jeremy Stacey
- Engineer – Cameron Craig
- Engineer [Assistant] – Patrick Moore
- Guitar [Electric Guitar] – Kevin Cormack
- Keyboards, Horns – Martin Slattery
- Saxophone, Background Vocals – Camille
- Lyrics By [Words], Vocals, Written-by – Sia Furler
- Mastered By – Frank Arkwright
- Mixed By – Tchad Blake
- Photography By [Cover Photography] – Gareth McConnell
- Producer, Acoustic Guitar [Acoustic Guitars], Percussion – Jimmy Hogarth
- Written-by, Bass [Bass Guitar] – Samuel Dixon

== Release history ==
Region	Date	Format	Label	Ref.
United Kingdom	9 August 2004	CD single	Go! Beat	
United Kingdom	9 August 2004	Vinyl, CD Maxi and digital download	Go! Beat	
North America	17 July 2008	Digital download	Go! Beat	
