= Colour the Small One =

- Standard cover

Studio album by Sia
- Released: 19 January 2004
- Recorded: 2003
- Studios: Heliocentric (Rye, England)
- Genres: Folk; electronica; folktronica; jazz
- Length: 48:18
- Labels: Astralwerks; Go! Beat
- Producer: Jimmy Hogarth

Sia chronology
Healing Is Difficult (2001)	Colour the Small One (2004)	Lady Croissant (2007)

Singles from Colour the Small One
- 1. "Don't Bring Me Down" Released: November 2003; 2. "Breathe Me" Released: 19 April 2004; 3. "Where I Belong" Released: 9 August 2004; 4. "Numb" Released: 18 April 2005

Colour the Small One is the third studio album by Australian singer-songwriter Sia, released in Australia and the United Kingdom on 19 January 2004. It was issued in the United States on 3 February 2004. Production was by Jimmy Hogarth, who also co-wrote three tracks and provided various instruments. It was re-released 10 January 2006 in the US, after the track "Breathe Me" became popular on alternative radio, following its feature as the closing song in the series finale of the HBO drama Six Feet Under (aired August 2005). The album peaked at No. 14 on the Billboard Top Heatseekers Albums Chart. "Breathe Me" was also featured in the television series, Bionic Woman.

== Background and recording ==
In 2000, Sia was based in the United Kingdom from recording her previous solo album Healing Is Difficult, which would be released in 2001. However, she was unhappy with the promotion of the album. Sia fired her manager, left Sony Music and signed with Go! Beat Records, a subsidiary of Universal Music Group. The album was recorded in 2003 at Heliocentric Studios in Rye with Jimmy Hogarth producing. Sia credits the biggest influence on her new album as touring with Zero 7. In a 2015 interview with Rolling Stone, she mentioned the album was heavily influenced by and, in her words, even "derivative" of the work of James Taylor, Kings of Convenience and other musicians the duo played in their tour bus.

All tracks are co-written by Sia, five of the original eleven tracks are co-written with bass guitarist, Samuel Dixon. Hogarth also co-wrote three tracks with Furler and provided various instruments. The track "The Bully" is co-written by Furler with United States musician, Beck. Two other songs from the Colour the Small One sessions were co-written with Beck but were not used. "Natale's Song" has backing vocals from UK singer Sophie Barker who had previously worked with Sia on the Zero 7 single, "Destiny" (August 2001). Another UK singer, Yvonne John Lewis, features on "The Church of What's Happening Now" as backing vocalist.

== Release and promotion ==
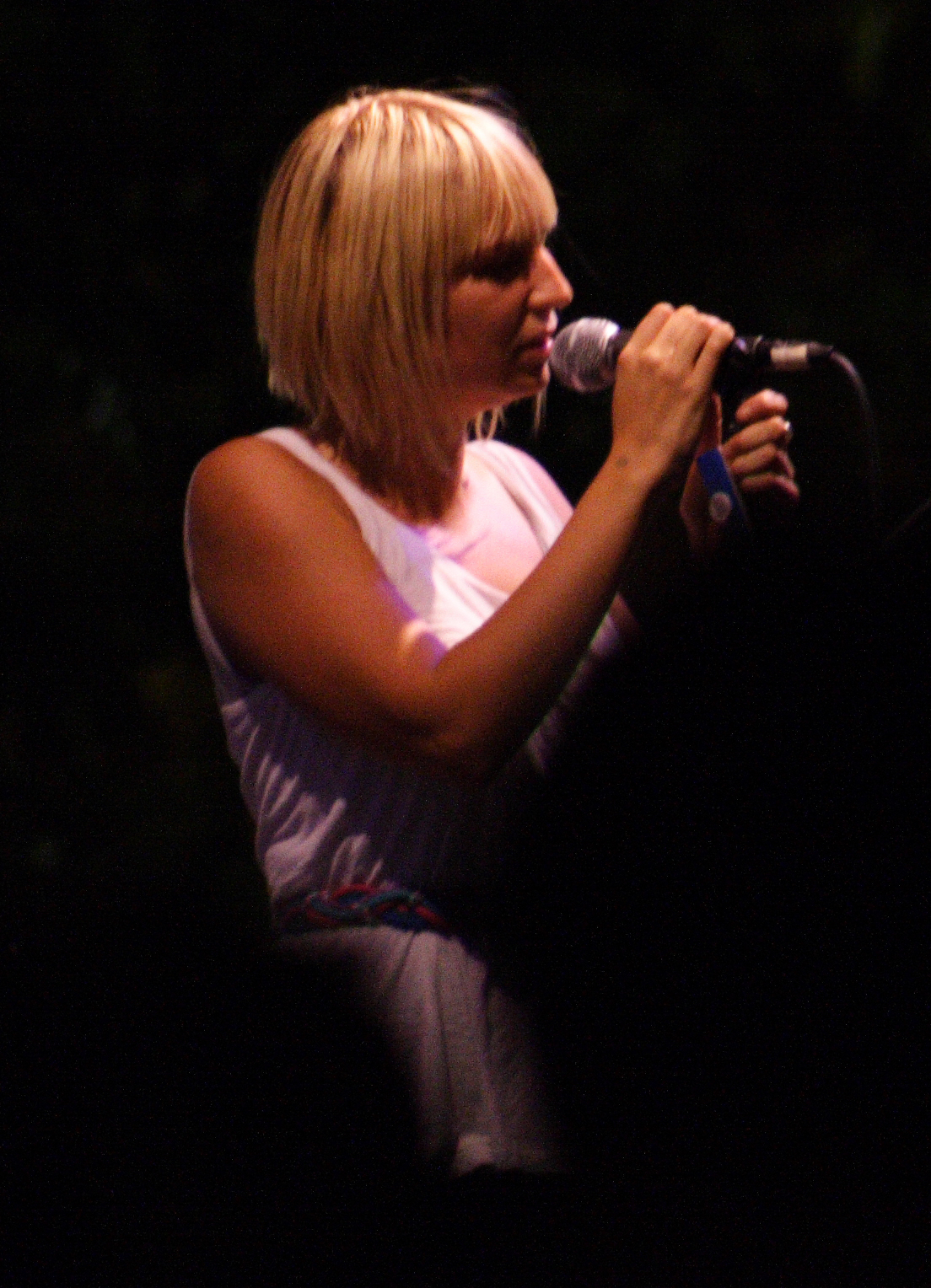
Sia at Bumbershoot in Seattle, 2006

The initial Australian version of Colour the Small One had eleven tracks, with "Butterflies" added for later versions. The track "Don't Bring Me Down" was issued as the lead single in Australia in late 2003. It was repackaged as a four-track extended play, Don't Bring Me Down, for UK release. When it was released in 2004, "Breathe Me", was the first single across most markets outside Australasia, whereas "Don't Bring Me Down" was second. "Breathe Me" reached No. 71 on the UK Singles Chart in May 2004, whilst the third single, "Where I Belong", reached the top 100 however the fourth single, "Numb", did not appear in the chart. Colour the Small One reached the top 200 on the UK Albums Chart. In promotion of the album, Go! Beat Records provided a "making-of" video. Music videos were shot for two tracks, "Breathe Me" and "Sunday", while an animation was made for "Numb". A music video was later shot for "Don't Bring Me Down" but featured the live version which appeared, in April 2007, on the live album, Lady Croissant.

After "Breathe Me" was used in the TV series finale of Six Feet Under (aired August 2005), the album was re-released on 10 January 2006 in the US, in an expanded version with 16 tracks. The album peaked at No. 14 on the Billboard Top Heatseekers Albums Chart. "Breathe Me" gained popularity on alternative rock and alternative adult radio stations. In 2007, "Breathe Me" was used in television commercials for Cooper University Hospital of Camden, New Jersey, USA. In April 2008, "Breathe Me" was featured on the German soap opera, Verbotene Liebe when gay supercouple Christian Mann and Oliver Sabel embraced as lovers for the first time on German television. Also, in October 2008, whilst at the Tokyo Game Show Ubisoft revealed a trailer for their upcoming video-game Prince of Persia which used the track "Breathe Me". Many of the commercials on NBC for the 2008 Summer Olympics featured clips of "Breathe Me" and the song was also used for Coca-Cola commercials during the 2010 Winter Olympics. "Breathe Me" is also appeared in the NBC television series, Bionic Woman. "Numb" was featured on an episode of Nip/Tuck (Season 3, Episode #33 "Rhea Reynolds"), played at the close of the episode. It is also regularly used in the UK TV series Holby City and has been played in the UK soap opera Hollyoaks several times. It has also been used in an episode of The Hills.

== Critical reception ==
Professional ratings
Aggregate scores
Source	Rating
Metacritic	77/100
Review scores
Source	Rating
AllMusic	3/5 stars
E! Online	A
The Guardian	3/5 stars
The Observer	3/5 stars
Pitchfork	7.3/10
PopMatters	9/10
Prefix	2.5/5 stars
Rolling Stone	2.5/5 stars
Slant Magazine	3.5/5 stars

Colour the Small One received generally favourable reviews, according to Metacritic website's rating of 77 out of 100 based on 15 professional critics.

Allmusic's Jon O'Brien noted that Furler's "hushed, intimate vocals are surrounded by acoustic folk-tinged electronica". Pitchfork's Chris Ott found the album's "downtempo kaleidoscope of pain and progress is unable to hold on to all that it reaches for, but delivers moments of brilliance and daring". Carmine Pascuzzi of Mediasearch described Furler providing a "spark to the acoustic/chilled tastings of today" with a "more experimental" album than Healing Is Difficult.

== Track listing ==
Standard edition
No.	Title	Writer(s)	Length
1.	"Rewrite"	Samuel Dixon, Sia Furler	4:45
2.	"Sunday"	Dixon, Furler	4:17
3.	"Breathe Me"	Dan Carey, Furler	4:34
4.	"The Bully"	Beck (aka B Hansen), Furler, Hogarth	3:51
5.	"Sweet Potato"	Kevin Cormack, Furler, Hogarth	4:00
6.	"Don't Bring Me Down"	Furler, Blair MacKichan, Dixon	4:25
7.	"Natale's Song"	Dixon, Furler	2:32
8.	"Butterflies" (International version only)	Cormack, Furler, Hogarth	3:26
9.	"Moon"	Dixon, Furler, Hogarth	5:02
10.	"The Church of What's Happening Now"	Dixon, Furler	4:27
11.	"Numb"	Furler, Felix Howard, James McMillan	4:40
12.	"Where I Belong"	Dixon, Furler	4:45
Total length:			48:18

US edition
No.	Title	Writer(s)	Length
13.	"Broken Biscuit"	Chad Fischer, Furler	4:55
14.	"Sea Shells"	Furler, Larry Goldings	4:51
15.	"Breathe Me" (Four Tet Remix)	Carey, Furler	5:03
16.	"Breathe Me" (Ulrich Schnauss Remix)	Carey, Furler	4:53
Total length:			1:08:00

Digital deluxe edition
No.	Title	Writer(s)	Length
13.	"Broken Biscuit"	Chad Fischer, Furler	4:55
14.	"Lucky"	Furler, Hogarth	3:13
15.	"So Bored"	Furler, Hogarth	3:09
16.	"Breathe Me" (Four Tet Remix)	Carey, Furler	5:01
17.	"Where I Belong" (Hot Chip Remix)	Dixon, Furler	5:03
18.	"Numb" (Tom Middleton Cosmos Mix)	Furler, Howard, McMillan	8:16
19.	"Breathe Me" (Mr Dan Remix)	Carey, Furler	4:38
Total length:			1:25:00

== Personnel ==
=== Musicians ===
- Sia Furler – vocals, background vocals, glockenspiel (9)
- Sam Dixon – bass guitar (1–8, 10–14), guitars (9), twelve-string guitar (1), accordion (1), noises (1)
- Jimmy Hogarth – guitar (1–11, 13, 14), acoustic guitar (12), keyboards (9), bass (9), percussion (2, 6, 9, 12)
- Jackie Shave – violin (2–10, 11, 13)
- Peter Hanson – violin (10, 11)
- Bruce White – viola (2, 11)
- Peter Lale – viola (10, 11)
- David Daniels – cello (2, 11)
- Ben Chappell – cello (11)
- Martin Slattery – keyboards (1–8, 10–14), piano (3), electric guitar (12), flute (2, 14), clarinet (2), horn (12), wind chimes (11)
- Kevin Cormack – guitar (2, 4, 5, 7, 12, 13), accordion (5, 8), clarinet (8), vibraphone (8), percussion (3–5, 8), noises (1, 6, 11, 14)
- Jeremy Stacey – drums (2, 4–14), bass drum (1)
- Felix Bloxsom – drums (1, 3), percussion (7), marimba (3)
- Felix Howard – acoustic guitar (11)
- Arnulf Lindner – double bass (11)
- Sophie Barker – background vocals (7)
- Yvonne John Lewis – background vocals (11)

=== Production ===
- Producer – Jimmy Hogarth
- Engineer – Cameron Craig
- Assistant engineer – Patrick Moore
- Mixing – Tchad Blake
- String arrangement – Will Malone
- Remix and additional production – Four Tet (15), Ulrich Schnauss (16)
- Photography – Martin Gerlach
- Artwork – Stephen Tappin
- Art direction – Blue Source

== Charts ==
Chart (2006)	Peak position
Australian Albums (ARIA)	113
UK Albums (OCC)	180
US Top Heatseekers (Billboard)	14
