= Yeah Ghost =

Studio album by Zero 7
- Released: 28 September 2009 (UK); 29 September 2009 (US); 2 October 2009 (Australia)
- Genres: Electronica; downtempo; pop; ambient
- Length: 45:17
- Label: Atlantic
- Producers: Henry Binns; Sam Hardaker

Zero 7 chronology
The Garden (2006)	Yeah Ghost (2009)	Record (2010)

Professional ratings
Aggregate scores
Source	Rating
Metacritic	59/100
Review scores
Source	Rating
Allmusic	3/5 stars
BBC Music	fairly negative
The Guardian	3/5 stars
The Independent	4/5 stars
Pitchfork	4.0/10
Planet Sound	5/10 stars
PopMatters	5/10 stars

Yeah Ghost is the fourth studio album by Zero 7, released in September 2009. The album features vocals by ESKA (on "Mr McGee", "Medicine Man", "Sleeper", and "The Road"), Martha Tilston (on "Pop Art Blue"), Binki Shapiro (on "Swing" and "Ghost Symbol"), Rowdy Superstar (on "Sleeper"), and Binns himself (on "Everything Up (Zizou)", an homage to French footballer Zinedine Zidane).

== Track listing ==
No.	Title	Writer(s)	Length
1.	"Count Me Out"	Henry Binns; Sam Hardaker; Rob Mullarkey; Tom Skinner; Eddie Stevens	1:26
2.	"Mr McGee"	Binns; Hardaker; Rob Gallagher; Eska Mtungwazi	4:19
3.	"Swing"	Binns; Hardaker; Binki Shapiro	3:58
4.	"Everything Up (Zizou)"	Binns; Hardaker; Mtungwazi	5:19
5.	"Pop Art Blue"	Binns; Hardaker; Martha Tilston	4:23
6.	"Medicine Man"	Binns; Hardaker; Mtungwazi	4:33
7.	"Ghost sYMbOL"	Binns; Hardaker; Shapiro	4:37
8.	"Sleeper"	Binns; Hardaker; Mtungwazi; Rowdy Superstar	4:40
9.	"Solastalgia"	Binns; Hardaker; Mullarkey; Skinner; Stevens	1:59
10.	"The Road"	Binns; Hardaker; Gallagher; Mtungwazi	3:43
11.	"All of Us"	Binns; Hardaker; Mullarkey; Skinner; Stevens	6:20

Digital release bonus track
No.	Title	Length
12.	"Methods"	8:43

== Personnel ==
Zero 7

- Henry Binns – producer, vocals (4)
- Sam Hardaker – producer

Musicians

- Eska – vocals (2, 6, 8, 10), additional background vocals (4)
- Rowdy Superstar – vocals (8)
- Martha Tilston – vocals (5)
- Jackie Daniels – vocals (7)
- Tom Skinner – drums (1, 4-6, 9, 11)
- Rob Mullarkey – bass guitar (3-6, 10, 11), steel drums (3), guitar (1, 9)
- Eddie Stevens – electronics and keyboards (1, 9, 11), marimba (5)
- Maynard O'Byrne – banjo (5)
- Finn Peters – flute and saxophone (3)
- Trevor Mires – euphonium and trombone (3)
- Sid Gauld – flugelhorn and trumpet (3)

Technical personnel

- Mike "Spike" Drake – mixing (2, 4, 6, 10)
- Phill Brown – mixing (1, 3, 5, 8, 9, 11)
- Kevin Metcalfe – mastering
