= Lullaby (Sophie Barker album) =

Studio album by Sophie Barker
- Released: 1 October 2004
- Label: Sony Music

Sophie Barker chronology
Lullaby (2004)	Earthbound (2006)

Lullaby is a platinum award winning children's album released by duo "The Rainbow Collections" (singer Sophie Barker and musician KK) on 14 June 2005 on Sony Music. Barker is best known for her work with Zero 7.

== Tracks ==
1. "Twinkle Twinkle Little Star" – 3:21
2. "Somewhere Over the Rainbow" – 2:53
3. "Ride a Cock Horse" – 0:12
4. "Lavender Blue" – 2:15
5. "Frere Jacques" – 1:05
6. "There Was a Crooked Man" – 0:13
7. "Sing a Song of Sixpence" – 2:45
8. "Little Bo Peep" – 2:13
9. "Baa Baa Black Sheep" – 3:46
10. "Little Miss Muffet" – 0:12
11. "Brahms Lullaby" – 2:36
12. "Oranges and Lemons" – 1:45
13. "Hush Little Baby" – 0:54
14. "Rock a Bye Baby" – 1:42
15. "Dream a Little Dream" – 2:00
16. "The Owl and the Pussycat" – 0:27
17. "Row Your Boat" – 4:36
18. "Silent Night" – 2:49

== See also ==
- http://www.sophiebarker.com/lullaby.php
- Lullaby at AllMusic
