= EP 2 (Zero 7 EP) =

EP by Zero 7
- Released: 20 November 2000
- Genre: Downtempo; trip hop
- Length: 22:00
- Label: Ultimate Dilemma

Zero 7 chronology
EP 1 (2000)	EP 2 (2000)	Simple Things (2001)

EP 2 is the second extended play (EP) released by British downtempo duo Zero 7.

== Track listing ==
No.	Title	Length
1.	"Give it Away"	5:20
2.	"Polaris"	4:48
3.	"Distractions"	5:17
4.	"Spinning Dub"	5:24
5.	"Monday Night"	6:35
