= KK (composer, producer) =

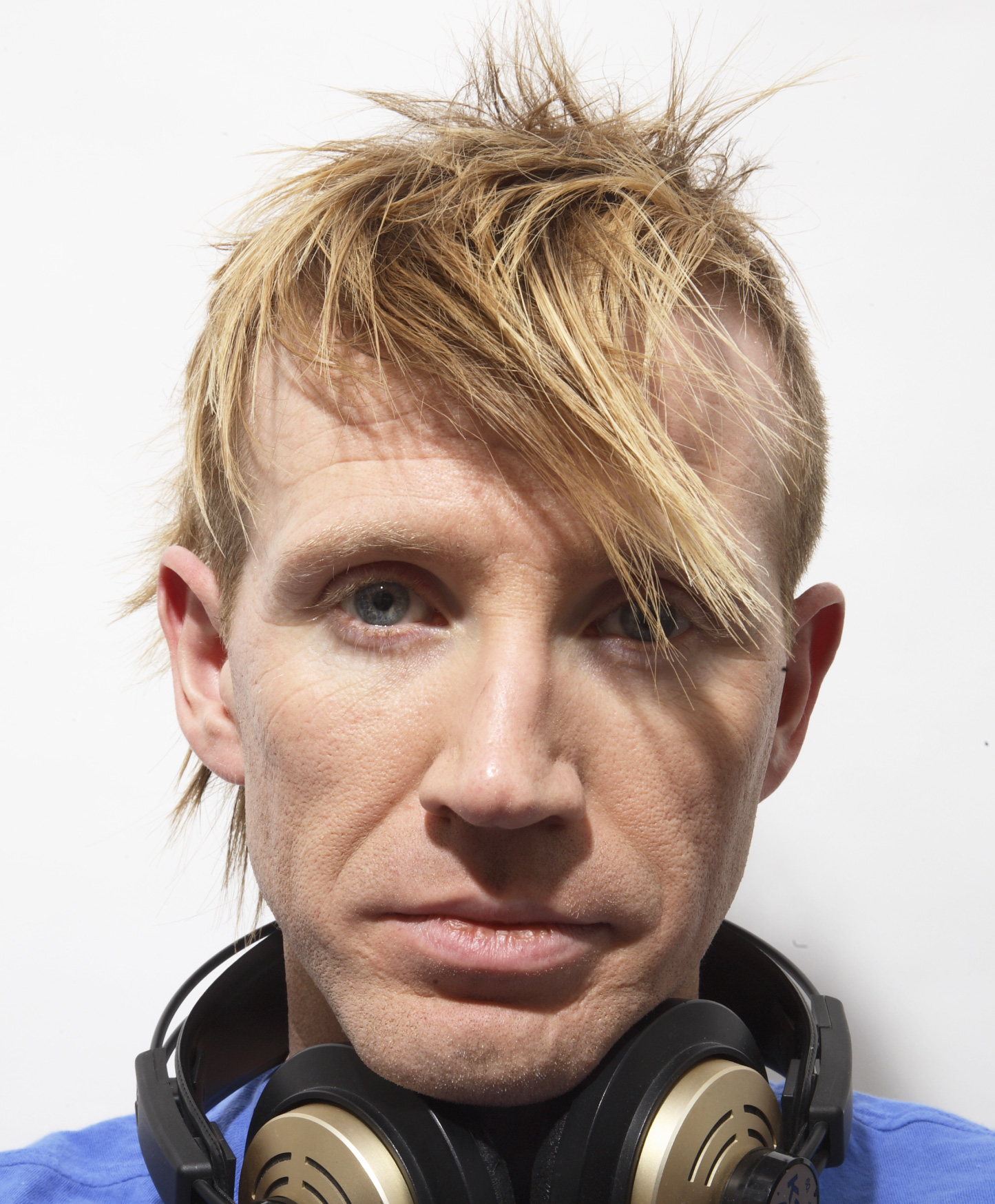

Background information
- Birth name: Kevin Kerrigan
- Born: December 1, 1975 (age 49); United Kingdom
- Genres: Pop music
- Occupation(s): Composer, record producer
- Years active: 1993-2004, 2005-present

KK (born Kevin Kerrigan, 1 December 1975) is a British composer, record producer and sound designer, best known for his work as a composer and music producer in the field of contemporary/pop music. His past work includes collaborations with Brian Eno, Björk, James, Dido, Natalie Imbruglia and Mediaeval Baebes.

With Sophie Barker (of Zero 7), KK is half of the platinum selling children's group The Rainbow Collections (Sony Music), whose popular releases have included Lullaby (2004), Toybox (2010) and Snowflake (2010).

Kerrigan collaborated with James Newton Howard on the soundtrack to Collateral (2004, Paramount Pictures), and has since composed soundtracks to other films such as The Thompsons (2012, Lionsgate) and Holy Ghost People (2013), "A Beginners Guide To Snuff" (2016), and "The Night Watchmen" (2016), as well as TV series such as Stage School (Channel 4), and has composed extensively for television channels such as Dave, Discovery Channel, BBC, ITV, Channel 4, E4, National Geographic Channel, Bravo, TLC and History Channel, and for various commercial clients

Other album releases as a recording artist include Chiaroscuro (2019), Solasta (2017), Empty World (2011), The Magic Lantern (2009) and Telescopes (2007).
