= Somersault (song) =

2004 single by Zero 7

Single by Zero 7 featuring Sia

from the album When It Falls
- Released: 17 May 2004
- Recorded: 2003–2004
- Genre: Downtempo; new wave; folk; soul
- Length: 3:56
- Label: East West; Ultimate Dilemma
- Songwriters: Henry Binns; Sia Furler; Sam Hardaker
- Producer: Zero 7

Zero 7 singles chronology
"Home" (2004)	"Somersault" (2004)	"Warm Sound" (2005)

Sia singles chronology
"Breathe Me" (2004)	"Somersault" (2004)	"Where I Belong" (2004)

Music video
- "Somersault" on YouTube

"Somersault" is a song by English musical duo Zero 7 featuring Australian singer Sia. It was released on 17 May 2004 as the second single from the band's second studio album, When It Falls (2004). It was the third time Zero 7 had featured Sia on a single release, following their singles, "Destiny" and "Distractions".

The song includes the memorable lines: "You put my feet back on the ground/ Did you know you brought me around/ You were sweet, and you were sound/ You saved me."

The Danger Mouse remix of "Somersault" was the 100 millionth track downloaded from the iTunes Store since it opened for business in April 2003 when Kevin Britten of Hays, Kansas downloaded the track.

== Reviews ==
Jemma Volp-Fletcher of Contact Music gave the track 7 out of 10, saying: "Another winner from Zero 7 – this time more folky with a plumped up acoustic guitar sound throughout. Sia Furler's vocal is outstanding as ever and immediately transports you to that summer's day, barbie on the go and sun blazing down. 'Somersault' is almost meditative with its glistening strings and delicate vocal - a shining offering from their latest album When it falls."

In a review of When It Falls album, John Bush of All Music complimented the track, saying; "Sia Furler shines on a track "Somersault". [It's] simultaneously spacy and down-home"

John Donnolly of The Digital Fix (Music) gave the song a negative review, saying; "Somersault, sounds exactly like their last single. There's acoustic guitar, a soul vocal (courtesy of Sia), violins, the merest hint of electronica... but the whole thing is dreadfully earnest, 'adult', polite, flat, boring, dull... Chill out? This one will go the whole hog and send you to sleep."

== Chart performance ==
In May 2004, The song debuted at number 56 on the UK Singles Charts and stayed in the Top 100 for TWO weeks.

== Track listings ==
CD single

1. Somersault (Radio Edit) - 3:56
2. Light Blue Movers - 5:27
3. Somersault (Reworked By Yam Who) - 8:22

DVD single

1. Somersault
2. Somersault (Video)
3. Home (Video)

Digital EP

1. Somersault (Radio Edit) - 3:57
2. Somersault (Reworked By Yam Who) - 8:24
3. Somersault (Dangermouse Remix) - 3:38

Digital download (live)

1. Somersault (live) - 5.46

=== Release history ===
Region	Date	Format	Label(s)	Ref.
United Kingdom	17 May 2004	CD single	EastWest; Ultimate Dilemma	
United Kingdom	17 May 2004	DVD single	EastWest; Ultimate Dilemma	
United Kingdom	17 May 2004	12-inch single	EastWest; Ultimate Dilemma	
United States	27 July 2004	Digital EP	Ultimate Dilemma	
United States	16 November 2005	Digital download (live)	Ultimate Dilemma	
