= The Garden (Zero 7 album) =

Studio album by Zero 7
- Released: 22 May 2006
- Genre: Electronica; downtempo; chill-out
- Length: 51:42
- Label: Atlantic
- Producer: Henry Binns; Sam Hardaker

Zero 7 chronology
When It Falls (2004)	The Garden (2006)	Yeah Ghost (2009)

Singles from The Garden
- 1. "Futures" Released: 13 March 2006; 2. "Throw It All Away" Released: 15 May 2006; 3. "You're My Flame" Released: 24 July 2006

Professional ratings
Aggregate scores
Source	Rating
Metacritic	70/100
Review scores
Source	Rating
AllMusic	4.5/5 stars
Entertainment Weekly	B
The Guardian	4/5 stars
The Independent	3/5 stars
Mojo	4/5 stars
MusicOMH	4/5 stars
Pitchfork	3.2/10
PopMatters	8/10
The Times	3/5 stars

The Garden is Zero 7's third studio album. It was released in the United Kingdom on 22 May 2006, and in the United States on 6 June 2006.

The album features vocal performances by José González, Sia, and Henry Binns.

The artwork for the album is by Gideon London and the CD was named after his collage. The album was nominated for a 2007 Grammy Award in the "Best Electronic/Dance Album" category.

== Track listing ==
No.	Title	Writer(s)	Vocals	Length
1.	"Futures"	Henry Binns; Sam Hardaker	José González	3:51
2.	"Throw It All Away"	Binns; Hardaker; Sia Furler; Dedi Madden	Sia	5:22
3.	"Seeing Things"	Binns; Hardaker		5:11
4.	"The Pageant of the Bizarre"	Binns; Hardaker; Furler	Sia and Henry Binns	4:23
5.	"You're My Flame"	Binns; Hardaker; Furler	Sia	3:17
6.	"Left Behind"	Binns; José González	José González	1:17
7.	"Today"	Binns; Hardaker; González	José González	4:05
8.	"This Fine Social Scene"	Binns; Hardaker; Furler	Sia and Henry Binns	4:29
9.	"Your Place"	Binns; Hardaker	Henry Binns	6:03
10.	"If I Can't Have You"	Binns; Hardaker; Furler; Madden	Sia	3:24
11.	"Crosses"	González	José González	6:41
12.	"Waiting to Die"	Binns; Hardaker; Furler	Sia and Henry Binns	3:39

iTunes bonus tracks
No.	Title	Length
13.	"Dreaming"	3:24
14.	"Inaminute"	4:58
15.	"Futures" (Acoustic version)	2:37

US/UK digital release bonus tracks
No.	Title	Length
13.	"Futures" (acoustic version)	2:43
14.	"Throw It All Away" (Tribute to Dilla remix by Demus)	4:04

== Charts ==
=== Weekly charts ===
Chart (2006)	Peak position
Australian Albums (ARIA)	81
Belgian Albums (Ultratop Flanders)	81
Belgian Albums (Ultratop Wallonia)	65
Dutch Albums (Album Top 100)	87
French Albums (SNEP)	28
Irish Albums (IRMA)	29
Italian Albums (FIMI)	52
New Zealand Albums (RMNZ)	30
Scottish Albums (OCC)	6
Swiss Albums (Schweizer Hitparade)	81
UK Albums (OCC)	4
US Billboard 200	94
US Top Dance/Electronic Albums (Billboard)	2

=== Year-end charts ===
Chart (2006)	Position
UK Albums (OCC)	185
US Top Dance/Electronic Albums (Billboard)	16

== Certifications ==
Region	Certification	Certified units/sales
United Kingdom (BPI)	Gold	100,000^{^}
^{^} Shipments figures based on certification alone.
