= Martha Tilston =

English folk singer-songwriter

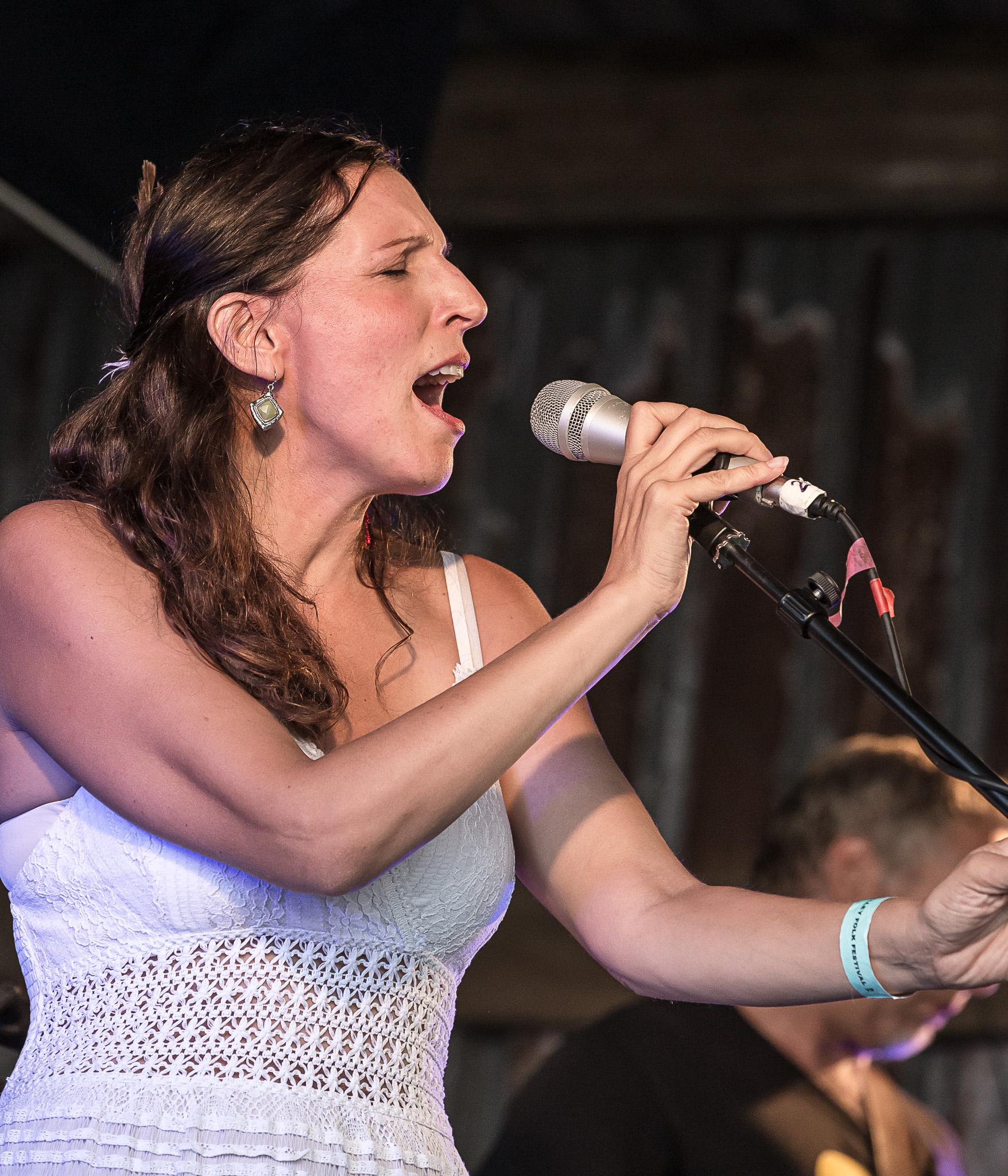
- at Purbeck Valley Folk Festival in 2022

Background information
- Born: 1975 or 1976 (age 50–51)
- Origin: Brighton, East Sussex, England
- Genre: Folk
- Years active: 2000–present
- Labels: Squiggly, Other Tongues
- Website: marthatilston.co.uk

Martha Tilston is a singer-songwriter, film-maker and writer based in Cornwall.

== Biography ==
Martha Tilston is the daughter of singer-songwriter Steve Tilston and stepdaughter of Irish folk performer Maggie Boyle. Trained as an artist and dramatist, she began her musical career in 2000 in Britain's alternative festival scene, as part of the travelling troupe called the Small World Solar Stage. She formed the duo Mouse with guitarist Nick Marshall, releasing two albums, Helicopter Trees (2000) and Mouse Tales (2001) and touring as a supporting act with Damien Rice. Her first solo album, Rolling, was issued in 2002 on her own label, Squiggly, followed by Bimbling in 2004.

Tilston's next album, Ropeswing (2005), featured backing musicians named The Woods, was a free download. It contains her two most politically explicit songs, "Artificial", which speaks of the deadliness of office life, and "Corporations", which is a critique of corporate rule and the "corporate–education complex". She appeared on several compilations, including her song "The Saddest Game" about child soldiers in Africa on The Big Issue's Peace Not War CD. Her song "Good World" is among several that she has written and performed on environmental subjects. However, much of her work is not political, focusing instead on personal freedom, love, inner peace and the natural world. Songs such as "Simple" on Ropeswing, "By the Lake" on Mouse Tales and "Firefly" on Bimbling are examples of these.

Tilston's album Of Milkmaids and Architects was released in late 2006. She was nominated for Best New Act in the 2007 BBC Radio 2 Folk Awards contest.

Throughout her career, Tilston has played unaccompanied solo gigs to larger concerts with the six-piece backing band The Woods. She toured Australia in 2008. Following a maternity break, she resumed playing live in April 2009, appearing on the fourth Zero 7 studio album, Yeah Ghost.

Tilston released two albums of largely self-penned songs (Lucy and the Wolves in 2010 and Machines of Love And Grace in 2012). In 2014, she released the album The Sea, consisting of traditional English folk songs about the sea, largely reflecting her family's strong musical traditions and involving her family and friends in the performances.

In 2021, she wrote, directed and starred in a feature film The Tape.

== Discography ==
=== Albums ===
- 2000: Mouse: Helicopter Trees (with Nick Marshall)
- 2001: Mouse: Mouse Tales (with Nick Marshall)
- 2003: Rolling
- 2004: Bimbling
- 2006: Ropeswing (credited to Martha Tilston and The Woods)
- 2007: Of Milkmaids and Architects
- 2008: Till I Reach the Sea (compilation EP)
- 2010: Lucy and the Wolves
- 2012: Machines of Love and Grace
- 2014: The Sea
- 2017: Nomad
- 2021: The Tape

== Sources ==
- Biography by Colin Irwin at Allmusic.com
- Review from The Argus, 25 September 2006.
- Review of Of Milkmaids and Architects by David Kidman
- Review from BBC Norfolk
- Short Interview from Friends of the Earth
- Interview with Colin Irwin of fRoots Magazine (subscription) No. 297, March 2008
- Martha Tilston on Folk Radio UK
- (Artist's newsletter, 6 January 2010)
