= Riad Michael =

German electronic musician and physician

Riad Alexander Michael, also known as Geyser, is a German electronic musician as well as physician.

After his noticed and critically acclaimed debut album Digger has been published under the Colonian label Mehrwert Records, he has founded his own label Geyser Recordings under which his further studio albums have been released. His productions have been described as original and have influences of different electronica styles such as downtempo, ambient or trance.

Riad Michael has written his medical dissertation concerning the subject of music drawing as psychotherapeutic method in psychogenic and psychosomatic disorders as well as absolved a scientific further education in music therapy.

== Discography ==
=== As Riad Michael ===
Albums

- 2009 Ambient I

Singles & EPs

- 2008 Abaro
- 2009 Snip
- 2010 Lights
- 2011 Desire

=== As Geyser ===
Albums

- 2000 Digger (promo version)
- 2001 Digger
- 2005 Concrete (featuring Leah)
- 2005 Atmosphere
- 2006 Digger 2006 (reissue)
- 2009 Clean Sweep
- 2011 Fifth

Singles & EPs

- 2001 Tomi
- 2005 Concrete (featuring Leah)
- 2006 Anker
- 2007 Decision

Compilations

- 2010 Selected Downbeat Works 01-09

== See also ==
- List of ambient music artists
