= When It Falls =

Studio album by Zero 7
- Released: 1 March 2004 (UK); 2 March 2004 (U.S.)
- Recorded: 2003–04
- Genres: Downtempo; trip hop; electronica; R&B
- Length: 59:07
- Labels: Ultimate Dilemma (UK); Elektra (U.S.)
- Producer: Zero 7

Zero 7 chronology
Simple Things Remixes (2003)	When It Falls (2004)	The Garden (2006)

Professional ratings
Aggregate scores
Source	Rating
Metacritic	68/100
Review scores
Source	Rating
Allmusic	3/5 stars
The Guardian	2/5 stars
Rolling Stone	3/5 stars

When It Falls is the second album by Zero 7, released on 1 March 2004.

The album features vocals by Sia (on tracks "Somersault" and "Speed Dial No.2"), Mozez (on "Warm Sound", "Over Our Heads" and "Morning Song"), Sophie Barker (on "Passing By" and "In Time") and Tina Dico (on "Home" and "The Space Between"). It was the band's first album to feature Dico and their second featuring Sia and Barker.

The album maintains a similar style to the band's first album, however it is notably more melancholy. Songs such as "Morning Song" keep a very somber tone in comparison to songs such as "In the Waiting Line" from Simple Things, which do so on a lesser level.

== Track listing ==
No.	Title	Writer(s)	Vocals	Length
1.	"Warm Sound"	Henry Binns; Sam Hardaker; Osmond Wright	Mozez	5:30
2.	"Home"	Binns; Hardaker; Tina Dickow; Dedi Madden	Tina Dico	4:37
3.	"Somersault"	Binns; Hardaker; Sia Furler	Sia Furler	6:57
4.	"Over Our Heads"	Binns; Hardaker; Wright	Mozez	4:24
5.	"Passing By"	Binns; Hardaker; Sophie Barker	Sophie Barker	4:52
6.	"When It Falls"	Binns; Hardaker		5:31
7.	"The Space Between"	Binns; Dickow	Tina Dico	6:01
8.	"Look Up"	Binns; Hardaker	Yvonne John Lewis	5:57
9.	"In Time"	Binns; Hardaker; Barker	Sophie Barker	4:58
10.	"Speed Dial No. 2"	Binns; Hardaker; Furler; Nigel Godrich	Sia Furler	3:51
11.	"Morning Song"	Binns; Hardaker; Wright	Mozez	6:32

== Personnel ==
Zero 7

- Henry Binns – producer
- Sam Hardaker – producer

Musicians

- Sophie Barker – lead vocals (5, 9)
- Brilliant Strings – strings (1, 3, 8, 10, 11)
- Neil Cowley – Wurlitzer (1, 3), Clavinet (5), Rhodes solo (7)
- Barnaby Dickinson – trombone (2, 7)
- Tina Dico – lead vocals (2, 7)
- Sia Furler – lead vocals (3, 10)
- Adam Glasser – harmonica (8)
- Nigel Godrich – Suzuki sounds (6), guitar and bass guitar (10)
- Sally Herbert – strings conductor (1, 3, 8, 10, 11), violin (4)
- Siobhan Lamb – flute (7)
- Yvonne John Lewis – lead vocals (8), backing vocals (3, 11)
- Dan Lipman – flute (1, 3)
- Dedi Madden – guitars (2, 6), acoustic guitar (1, 3, 4, 7-9, 11), electric guitar (5, 11)
- Mozez – lead vocals (1, 4, 11), backing vocals (11)
- Robin Mullarkey – bass guitar (1, 4-9, 11)
- Gerard Presencer – trumpet and flugelhorn solo (2, 7), brass arrangements (2, 7), woodwind arrangement (7)
- Jeremy Stacey – drums (1, 2, 6, 9, 11)
- Allan Simpson – acoustic guitar (7, 11)
- Eddie Stevens – Moog synthesizer (1), Rhodes solo (6)
- Crispin Taylor – drums (5, 7, 10)
- Pete Trotman – bass guitar (2, 3)

== Singles ==
The following singles were released from the album:

*
"Home" (23 February 2004)
    - UK CD single EW282CD
    1. "Home" 4.38
    2. "Home (Stereolab Remix)" 6.51
    3. "Home (Ben Watt Remix)" 8.51
    - UK 12" single EW282T
    1. "Home" 4.38
    2. "Home (Stereolab Remix)" 6.51
    3. "Home (Ben Watt Remix)" 8.51
    - UK CD promo PRO 4516
    1. "Home (Radio Edit)" 3.32
    - UK 12" promo UDR PRO 4523
    1. "Home" 4.38
    - UK 12" promo UDR PRO 4531
    1. "Home (Ben Watt Remix)" 8.51
    2. "Home (Ben Watt Instrumental)"
    3. "Home" 4.38
    - UK 12" promo 5050467 EW 282 T
    1. "Home" 4.38
    2. "Home (Stereolab Remix)" 6.51
    3. "Home (Ben Watt Remix)" 8.51
    - UK 12" promo ED 6424
    1. "Home (Radio Edit)" 3.32
    2. "Home" 4.37
    3. "Home (Stereolab Remix)" 6.50
    4. "Home (Ben Watt Remix Edit)" 3.25
    - EU CD promo SAM 00910
    1. "Home (Radio Edit)" 3.32
    - US CD promo PRCD 1978–2
    1. "Home (Radio Edit)" 3.32
    2. Home 4.37
    3. Home (Stereolab Remix) 6.50
    4. Home (Ben Watt Remix Edit) 3.25
*
"Somersault" (17 May 2004)
    - UK CD single EW290CD
    1. "Somersault (Radio Edit)" 3.57
    2. "Light Blue Movers" 5.28
    - UK 12" single EW290T
    1. "Somersault (Radio Edit)" 3.57
    2. "Light Blue Movers" 5.28
    3. "Somersault (Reworked By Yam Who)"
    - UK 12" promo PRO4834
    1. "Somersault"
    - EU CD promo SAM 00944
    1. "Somersault (Radio Edit)" 3.57
*
"Warm Sound" (remixes) (16 May 2005)
    - UK 12" single ATUK006T
    1. Warm Sound (Justin Haylock Mix)
    2. Warm Sound (Remystify Mix)

== Certifications ==
Region	Certification	Certified units/sales
United Kingdom (BPI)	Platinum	300,000^{‡}
^{‡} Sales+streaming figures based on certification alone.
