= Another Late Night: Zero 7 =

Compilation album by Zero 7
- Released: 18 February 2002
- Label: Azuli, Kinetic
- Producer: Zero 7

Zero 7 chronology
Simple Things (2001)	Another Late Night: Zero 7 (2002)	Simple Things Remixes (2003)

Another Late Night chronology
Rae & Christian (2001)	Zero 7 (2002)	Groove Armada (2002)

Professional ratings
Review scores
Source	Rating
Allmusic	3/5 stars

Another Late Night: Zero 7 is a DJ mix album, mixed by English musical duo Zero 7. It is the fourth in the series from Late Night Tales. It was released on 18 February 2002 on Late Night Tales in the UK (catalogue no. ALNCD04) and on Kinetic Records in the USA (catalogue no. 67728-54705-2).

== Track listing ==
No.	Title	Artist	Length
1.	"Sunrays"	Yesterday's New Quintet	3:14
2.	"Real Eyes"	Quasimoto	2:51
3.	"Witness" (Walworth Road Rockers Dub)	Roots Manuva	3:01
4.	"Jealousy"	Slum Village	3:51
5.	"Channel 1 Suite"	The Cinematic Orchestra	4:11
6.	"Christine Bonilla"	Joy Zipper	3:53
7.	"Ghost Ship In A Storm"	Jim O'Rourke	3:41
8.	"'93 'til Infinity"	Souls Of Mischief	4:39
9.	"Pra Manha"	Da Lata	5:08
10.	"Bonnie and Clyde" (Herbert's Fred & Ginger Mix)	Serge Gainsbourg	4:11
11.	"Happiness" (Ashley Beedle's West Coast Mix)	Shawn Lee	4:51
12.	"You Can't Turn Me Away"	Sylvia Striplin	4:15
13.	"Loving You, Holding You"	Don Blackman	3:58
14.	"Cool Out"	Leroy Hutson	2:47
15.	"Truth & Rights"	Zero 7	4:33
16.	"People Make the World Go Round"	The Stylistics	6:15

== Single ==
"Truth And Rights" (a mistitled cover of Johnny Osborne's "Truths & Rights") was released as a single to promote the album in 2002.

- UK 7" single ALN704
1. "Truth And Rights"
2. "Truth And Rights (Spoken Word Story)"
