= Saint-Mathieu-d'Harricana =

- Municipality

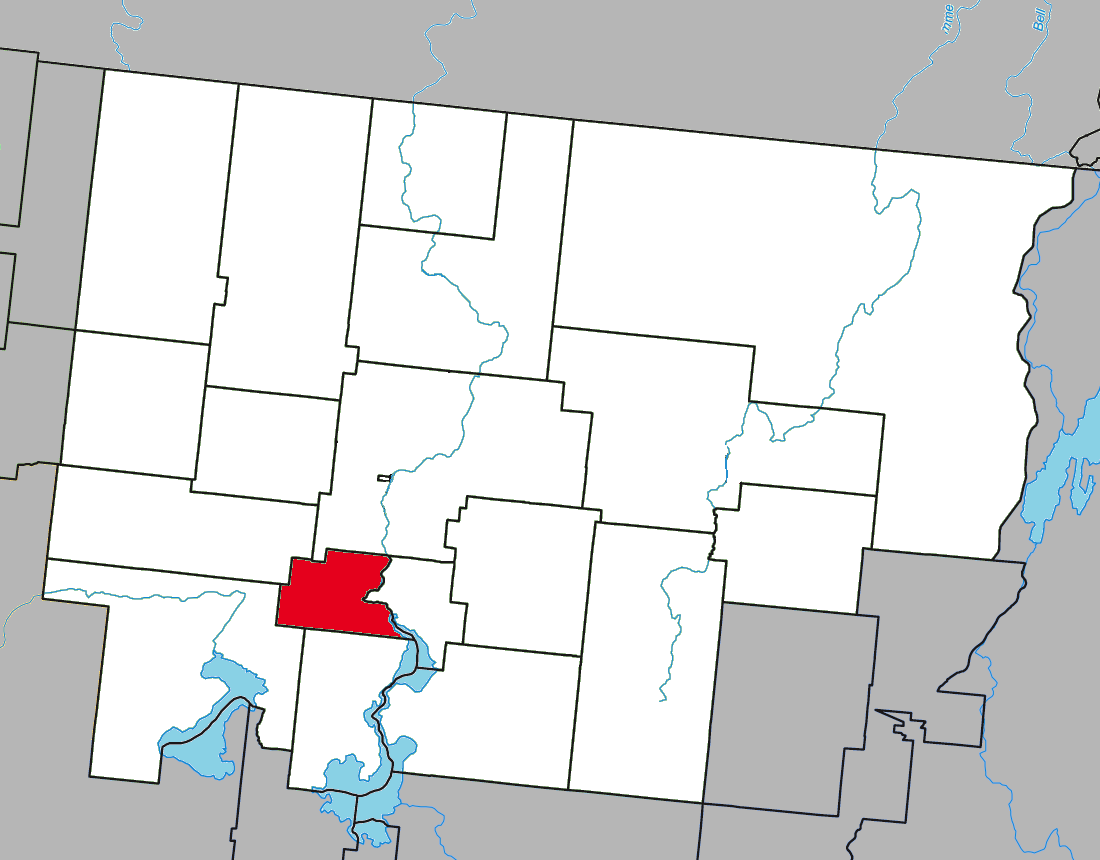
- Location within Abitibi RCM

- Location in western Quebec
- Coordinates: 48°28′N 78°08′W
- Country: Canada
- Province: Quebec
- Region: Abitibi-Témiscamingue
- RCM: Abitibi
- Settled: 1912
- Constituted: January 1, 1943

Government
  - Mayor: Martin Roch
  - Federal riding: Abitibi—Témiscamingue
  - Prov. riding: Abitibi-Ouest

Area
  - Total: 111.69 km^{2} (43.12 sq mi)
  - Land: 105.86 km^{2} (40.87 sq mi)

Population (2021)
  - Total: 770
  - Density: 7.3/km^{2} (19/sq mi)
  - Pop (2016-21): ▲4.2%
  - Dwellings: 349
- Time zone: UTC−05:00 (EST)
  - Summer (DST): UTC−04:00 (EDT)
- Postal code(s): J0Y 1M0
- Area code: 819
- Highways: R-109
- Website: www.stmathieudharricana.com

Saint-Mathieu-d'Harricana (French pronunciation: [sɛ̃ matjø daʁikana], lit. 'Saint-Mathieu of Harricana') is a municipality in the Canadian province of Quebec, located in the Abitibi Regional County Municipality. It is part of the census agglomeration of Amos.

The municipality is home to a bottling plant operated by Eska Water, which sources and bottles natural spring water from the surrounding region.

== Demographics ==
In the 2021 Census of Population conducted by Statistics Canada, Saint-Mathieu-d'Harricana had a population of 770 living in 318 of its 349 total private dwellings, a change of 4% from its 2016 population of 739. With a land area of 105.86 km^{2} (40.87 sq mi), it had a population density of 7.3/km^{2} (18.8/sq mi) in 2021.

As of the 2021 census, mother tongues spoken are:

- English as first language: 1.3%
- French as first language: 97.4%
- English and French as first language: 0%
- Other as first language: 1.3%

Historical census populations – Saint-Mathieu-d'Harricana

Year	Pop.	±%
1951	465	—
1956	478	+2.8%
1961	478	+0.0%
1966	441	−7.7%
1971	399	−9.5%
1976	406	+1.8%
1981	549	+35.2%
1986	611	+11.3%

Year	Pop.	±%
1991	655	+7.2%
1996	717	+9.5%
2001	700	−2.4%
2006	716	+2.3%
2011	696	−2.8%
2016	739	+6.2%
2021	770	+4.2%

Population figures based on revised counts.
Source: Statistics Canada

== Government ==
Municipal council (as of 2023):

- Mayor: Martin Roch
- Councillors: Miguel Roy, Simon Roy, Éric Arseneault, Lucie Crépeault, Guillaume Bergeron, Sébastien Morand
