= Eska Water =

Canadian bottled water brand from Quebec

- Eska bottling facility in Saint-Mathieu-d'Harricana, Quebec
- Market: Canada
- Produced by: Eska Inc. (Eaux Vives Water Inc.)
- Introduced: 2005; 21 years ago
- Source: Saint-Mathieu–Lac-Berry esker, Abitibi-Témiscamingue, Quebec
- Type: Still and sparkling
- pH: 7.9
- Bromine (Br): 0
- Calcium (Ca): 24
- Chloride (Cl): 0
- Fluoride (F): 0
- Magnesium (Mg): 4.0
- Nitrate (NO_{3}): 0.40
- Potassium (K): 0.9
- Sodium (Na): 2.4
- Sulfate (SO_{4}): 7.2
- TDS: 86
- Website: www.eskawater.com
- All concentrations in milligrams per liter (mg/L); pH without units

Eska (stylized ESKA) is a Canadian brand of bottled water drawn from the Saint-Mathieu–Lac-Berry esker in Abitibi-Témiscamingue, Quebec. Corporate offices are in Laval, Quebec, and bottling occurs beside the source in Saint-Mathieu-d'Harricana, Quebec.

== History ==
Commercial bottling began in the early 2000s under the name "Esker Natural Spring Water", then owned and operated by Eaux Vives Harricana for Parmalat. In 1999, Eaux Vives Harricana announced their intentions to invest over CA$37 million into starting a bottling plant in Quebec's Abitibi region, in which water was collected from an esker. By 2003, the brand sold bottled water nationally. The brand was relaunched in the mid-2000s as Eska following corporate restructuring under Eaux Vives Water Inc.

Expansion continued over the following decade. In 2009, the company added a bottling line and created new positions at the plant. In 2017, increased demand for carbonated products saw part of the production handled on a Montreal line while still using water from the same esker.

== Water sales ==
Eska sells still and carbonated spring water across Canada. Trade media reported the firm’s transition to bottles made from 100% recycled PET (rPET) beginning 2019–2021, while grocery listings and product registries document retail availability and note that carbonation is added at bottling.

== Controversies ==
In 2018, a CBC Marketplace investigation using a fluorescent-tagging method reported microplastics in several bottled-water brands sold in Canada, including Eska. The Canadian Beverage Association responded that standardized, peer-reviewed protocols were needed to interpret such results.

== See also ==
- Bottled water
- Esker
- Poland Spring
