= Don't Bring Me Down (Sia song) =

Single by Sia

from the album Colour the Small One
- Released: November 2003
- Studio: Heliocentric Studios, Rye, England
- Length: 4:27
- Label: Go! Beat
- Songwriters: Sia Furler; Blair MacKichan; Samuel Dixon
- Producer: Jimmy Hogarth

Sia singles chronology
"Distractions" (2002)	"Don't Bring Me Down" (2003)	"Breathe Me" (2004)

"Don't Bring Me Down" is a 2003 song by Australian singer Sia. It was released in Australia in November 2003 (and in the United Kingdom on 9 February 2004) as the first single from her third studio album Colour the Small One (2004). The track was written by Sia and Blair MacKichan who had recently worked with Will Young's on his Brit Award winning song, "Your Game". The track received little promotion and did not chart.

In the video The making of Colour the Small One, Sia explains: "I hadn't done drugs for a period of time before writing that song. It was about having a really horrible comedown off ecstasy, and the concept of being abandoned before you get to sleep - being the last one high when everyone else has gone to bed."

The track is included on the soundtrack for the film 36th Precinct and a number of compilations including, "Songbirds", Chillout Sessions, Vol. 6 as well as Sia's 2007 live album, Lady Croissant.

== Music video ==
The music video for the song featured a live recording of the song released on the live album Lady Croissant in 2007. It featured Sia singing the song in front of a green screen, interjected with scenes of a young girl named Ella playing with balloons, swimming, and eating ice-cream. The video was directed by filmmaker and musician Nik Fackler of the band Icky Blossoms.

== Reviews ==
Katherine Tomlinson of All Gigs UK said; "'Don't Bring Me Down' features breathy vocals, mirroring the latest style brought to fame by Katie Melua and Norah Jones, complete with haunting strings, and dreamy vocals." Tareck Ghoneim of Contact Music said this EP demonstrates Sia's uniqueness. He said, "Her voice is expressed subtly with conviction and shows depth when needed. It’s the enchanting essence of Sia that makes her so appealing to listen to." Carmine Pascuzzi in a review of the album said of the song, "The acoustic guitar sits beautifully over the heartfelt strings". However, in a review of the album, Pitchfork Media's Chris Ott said the first single "Don't Bring Me Down" was the wrong choice, describing it as "a dolled-up, half-asleep stab at commercial trip-hop starving for a good hook".

== Track listing ==
1 Track Single

1. Don't Bring Me Down - 4:27

EP

1. Don't Bring Me Down - 4:27
2. Broken Biscuit - 4:56
3. Lucky - 3:16
4. So Bored - 3:09
- Note: Track 2 is available on the US re-issue of Colour The Small One. Tracks 3 and 4 on the EP are on the digital deluxe version of Colour the Small One.
