= Breathe Me =

Single by Sia

from the album Colour the Small One
- B-side: "Sea Shells"
- Released: 19 April 2004
- Length: 4:32
- Label: Systemtactic; Go! Beat; Astralwerks
- Songwriters: Sia Furler; Dan Carey
- Producer: Jimmy Hogarth

Sia singles chronology
"Don't Bring Me Down" (2003)	"Breathe Me" (2004)	"Somersault" (2004)

Music video
- "Breathe Me" on YouTube

"Breathe Me" is a song by Australian singer Sia. Released on 19 April 2004, it is featured on her third studio album, Colour the Small One. The song became popular on alternative radio and has been used in many different forms of media, most notably in the series finale of Six Feet Under in 2005 and the television film Cyberbully in 2011.

== Critical reception ==
Rolling Stone called the song "delicate and haunting". The song has received increasingly positive reviews in years since its release, being described as "beautiful and moving."

== Chart performance and sales ==
In the United Kingdom, "Breathe Me" peaked at number 71 on 1 May 2004. In the United States, the song charted at number 24 on 27 March 2010 on the Rock Digital Songs, a component chart on the Billboard magazine. "Breathe Me" also reached number 19 in Denmark in 2011 and number 81 in France in 2012.

As a single it had sold over 1.2 million copies in the United States by 2014.

== Music video ==
The official music video was directed by Daniel Askill. It was shot over three days in a themed hotel in London and it is constructed with over 2,500 individual polaroid stills.

== Track listings ==
- Maxi CD Pt.1
1. "Breathe Me" – 4:32
2. "Sea Shells" – 4:52
- Maxi CD Pt.2
1. "Breathe Me" – 4:34
2. "Breathe Me (Four Tet remix)" – 5:01
3. "Breathe Me (Ulrich Schnauss remix)" – 4:57
4. "Breathe Me (Mylo remix)" – 6:22
5. "Breathe Me (Mr. Dan remix)" – 4:38
- 10" Pt.1
1. A: "Breathe Me (Four Tet remix)" – 5:01
2. B: "Where I Belong (Hot Chip remix)" – 5:03
- 10" Pt.2
1. A: "Breathe Me (Ulrich Schnauss remix)" – 4:57
2. B: "Numb (Leila remix)" – 4:14
- 12" Single
1. A1 "Breathe Me (Mylo remix)" – 6:22
2. A2 "Breathe Me (Ulrich Schnauss remix)" – 4:57
3. B1 "Breathe Me (Four Tet remix)" – 5:01
4. B2 "Breathe Me (Mr. Dan remix)" – 4:38

== Charts ==
Chart (2004–2014)	Peak position
Denmark (Tracklisten)	19
France (SNEP)	81
UK Singles (OCC)	71
US Rock Digital Songs (Billboard)	24

== Certifications ==
Region	Certification	Certified units/sales
Denmark (IFPI Danmark)	Platinum	90,000^{‡}
New Zealand (RMNZ)	Platinum	30,000^{‡}
United Kingdom (BPI)	Platinum	600,000^{‡}
United States	—	1,200,000
^{‡} Sales+streaming figures based on certification alone.

== Release history ==
Region	Date	Format	Label	Ref.
Canada	19 April 2004	CD single (part 1)	Go! Beat	
Canada	19 April 2004	CD single (part 2)	Go! Beat	
Germany	19 April 2004	CD single (part 1)	Go! Beat	
Germany	19 April 2004	CD single (part 2)	Go! Beat	
Germany	19 April 2004	Vinyl single	Go! Beat	
United Kingdom	19 April 2004	12"	Go! Beat	
United States	20 April 2004	CD single (part 1)	Go! Beat	
United States	3 January 2006	Digital download	Astralwerks	
