= Eska (album) =

ESKA

Studio album by Eska
- Released: 27 April 2015
- Genre: Neofolk; experimental folk; pop
- Length: 35:17
- Label: Naim; Earthling Recordings
- Producer: Eska; Matthew Herbert; David Okumu; Leroy Robinson; John McLaughlin; Louis Hackett

Eska chronology
Gatekeeper (2013)	ESKA (2015)

ESKA is the debut album of British singer-songwriter Eska, released on 27 April 2015. The album was released in collaboration with Naim Records and Eska's own Earthling Recordings. It was shortlisted for the 2015 Mercury Music Prize.

== Critical reception ==
Professional ratings
Aggregate scores
Source	Rating
Metacritic	82/100
Review scores
Source	Rating
Independent On Sunday	5/5 stars
The Observer	4/5 stars
musicOMH	4/5 stars
The 405	7/10 stars
Uncut	8/10
Evening Standard	4/5
Financial Times	4/5

Upon release, ESKA was received with acclaim from critics. At Metacritic, which assigns a normalized rating out of 100 to reviews from critics, the album received an average score of 82, based on 5 reviews, indicating "generally favorable reviews". The Observer wrote that ESKA was a "mind-bending gem", offering particular praise for "This Is How a Garden Grows". Praise for "This Is How a Garden Grows" was mirrored in Mixmag who made it a Tune of the Month writing "...having toured and performed with Grace Jones, The Cinematic Orchestra. Writing for Uncut, John Lewis praised Eska escaping of her influences saying, "so distinctive and confessional is Eska's voice she's created a British pastoral music that defies classification". Writing for the Independent on Sunday, Howard Male said of the album, "Only a couple of times a decade does a new artist come along who so impresses that I find myself getting excited about what they’ll do next, even as I’m still assimilating their debut." In describing ESKA, Male calls the album "touching, powerful, experimental and sensuous – you could pick just about any positive adjective and it would apply," and in describing the individual tracks, the reviewer states that "each song here is both an independent entity of striking originality and a vital part of a truly cohesive album that is sure to be deemed a classic in decades to come."

== Track listing ==
No.	Title	Writer(s)	Producer(s)	Length
1.	"This Is How a Garden Grows"	Eska Mtungwazi	Eska; Matthew Herbert	3:52
2.	"Gatekeeper"	Eska Mtungwazi	Eska; David Okumu	4:59
3.	"Rock of Ages"	Eska Mtungwazi; Edward Maclean	Eska; Matthew Herbert	4:29
4.	"Boundaries"	Eska Mtungwazi	Eska; Matthew Herbert	3:54
5.	"She's in the Flowers"	Eska Mtungwazi; Anselmo Netto	Eska; Matthew Herbert; David Okumu	3:10
6.	"Shades of Blue"	Eska; Leroy Robinson; John McLaughlin	Eska Mtungwazi; Louis Hackett	4:04
7.	"Heroes & Villains"	Eska Mtungwazi	Eska; Louis Hackett	3:03
8.	"To Be Remembered"	Eska Mtungwazi	Eska; Matthew Herbert	3:04
9.	"Dear Evelyn"	Eska Mtungwazi	Eska; Louis Hackett	2:01
10.	"So Long Eddy"	Louis Hackett; Eska Mtungwazi	Louis Hackett; Eska	2:41
Total length:				35:17

Japanese edition bonus tracks
No.	Title	Writer(s)	Producer(s)	Length
11.	"Red"	Eska; Jesse Hackett; Robin Mullarkey	Eska; Matthew Herbert; David Okumu	5:18
12.	"Dear Evelyn" (Song Version)	Eska Mtungwazi	Eska; Louis Hackett	1:59
Total length:				42:42
