= Mozez =

Jamaican-British musician

- Born: Osmond Wright
- Genres: Soul, pop, dance
- Occupations: Singer, songwriter, producer
- Years active: 1994–present
- Label: Numen Records
- Website: mozez.co.uk

Osmond Wright, professionally known as Mozez, is a Jamaican-born and London-based singer, songwriter, and producer. He has released three studio albums, So Still (2005), Wings (2015), and Lights On (2021).

== Career ==
After moving to London, his first major break as a professional artist came in 1996 when, as part of British vocal house duo Spirits, he had hits with "Don't Bring Me Down" and "Spirit Inside". In the early 2000s he became established as the male lead singer for Zero 7.

After contributing to the first two Zero 7 albums (Simple Things and When It Falls), Mozez launched his solo career and his own record label, Numen Records.

His debut solo album So Still was released on 10 October 2005, featuring many of the down-tempo elements he has become known for. Collaborators on the album included producer Guy Sigsworth, Nightmares on Wax, and Henry Binns of Zero 7.

In 2012, his record label released the debut album, Gentle Beauty, by Italian singer-songwriter Mari Conti. The album was co-written and produced by Mozez.

On 27 November 2015 Mozez released his second album, Wings. The album received a rating of 4.5 out of 5 stars from Pop Magazine and is listed at #4 on the magazine's Best Albums of 2015 ranking.

In 2020, his record label released the singles "Hangin' on a Kiss", "Live Now", and "New Dawn" by Mari Conti, all songs co-written and produced by Mozez.

On 29 June 2020 Mozez released a new song, "Looking at Me", which serves as the lead single from his third studio album, Lights On. On 23 October 2020 he released the second single, "That's Crazy". Two more singles, "Destiny Ride" and "Wait a Minute", were released in 2021. The album, Lights On, was released on 16 July 2021.

== Discography ==
=== Studio albums ===
- So Still (2005)
- Wings (2015)
- Lights On (2021)
- Dreams (with Tim Angrave, 2024)

=== Remix albums ===
- Time Out (2011)
- Dream State (2016)
- Arcadian Muse (2023)

=== Singles ===
- "Wings" (2015)
- "Run River" (2015)
- "Looking at Me" (2020)
- "That's Crazy" (2020)
- "Destiny Ride" (2021)
- "Wait a Minute" (2021)
- "Thankful" (2021)
