= Sophie Barker =

British singer and songwriter

- Born: Sophie Alexandra Jessica Barker; 5 November 1971 (age 54); London, England
- Genres: Alternative rock; trip hop
- Occupations: Singer; songwriter
- Instruments: Vocals; guitar
- Years active: 1996–present
- Label: Sony
- Website: SophieBarker.com

Sophie Alexandra Jessica Barker (born 5 November 1971) is a British singer and songwriter from London, best known for her work with the British downtempo group Zero 7.

== Biography ==
Barker left University College London after two years to become a full-time singer, signing to Sony Records in 1996 with fellow singer Kate Holmes under the name "Sirenes". They released three singles, Blind, Deep End, and Sun Don't Shine, before splitting up at the end of 1997.

Barker appeared on the final two tracks of English house band Groove Armada's second album Vertigo (1999).

Barker contributed to three songs on the Zero 7 album Simple Things (2001), including their biggest hit, "Destiny", accompanied by fellow vocalist Sia. Barker also co-wrote and sang on "In the Waiting Line" – which appeared on the popular Garden State soundtrack – and "Spinning". She also contributed to the follow-up 2004 Zero 7 album When It Falls, co-writing the songs "Passing By" and "In Time".

Barker collaborated with musician KK in 2004 to release Lullaby, an album of night-time songs for children. That same year, she appeared as a backing vocalist on Sia's album Colour the Small One, appearing on the track Natale's Song. She followed this with a solo album entitled Earthbound, released in 2005. Barker has also worked with The Egg ("Walking Away"), electronica artists Grooverider (Time, Space), Groove Armada (Inside My Mind (Blue Skies), Your Song) and the acid-jazz duo Muki ("I Don't Want to Know"). Barker was featured in a 2006 British Airways UK television campaign, singing a cover version of John Denver's Leaving on a Jet Plane. Barker also featured as a guest singer on Quiet Letters by Bliss, and then collaborated and provided vocals for their album entitled No One Built This Moment.

In 2010, she signed with the independent record label, Ho Hum Records. According to the label's website, Barker has recorded a new album, Seagull, which was released on 6 May 2011. Seagull spawned two singles, "Say Goodbye" and "Bluebell".

On 13 January 2017 she released her third solo album, Break the Habit on Disco Gecko Recordings.

She also appeared on CeCe X's all female synth pop EP 'Synthgirl Squad', duetting and co-writing on the track, 'Take Me Away', released in 2017.

== Discography ==
- Lullaby (2004)
- Earthbound (2005)
- Seagull (2011)
- Snowflake (The Rainbow Collection) (2011)
- A Forest / Say Goodbye (2011)
- I Do it to Myself (2016)
- Break the Habit (2017)
- LSA (2017)
- Neon Lines (2019)
