= Simple Things (Zero 7 album) =

Studio album by Zero 7
- Released: 23 April 2001
- Genre: Electronica; downtempo; chill-out
- Length: 61:14
- Label: Ultimate Dilemma
- Producer: Zero 7

Zero 7 chronology
EP 2 (2000)	Simple Things (2001)	Another Late Night: Zero 7 (2002)

Singles from Simple Things
- 1. "I Have Seen" Released: 4 June 2001; 2. "Destiny" Released: 6 August 2001; 3. "End Theme (Roni Size Remixes)" Released: 22 October 2001; 4. "In the Waiting Line" Released: 5 November 2001; 5. "Distractions" Released: 18 March 2002

Simple Things is the debut studio album by English duo Zero 7, released on 23 April 2001. It peaked at number 28 on the UK Albums Chart, staying on the chart for 56 weeks. In the U.S., it reached number 4 on the Billboard Top Dance/Electronic Albums. It was nominated for the Mercury Prize. Five singles, such as "Destiny" and "In the Waiting Line", promoted the album prior to its release.

== Critical reception ==
Professional ratings
Review scores
Source	Rating
AllMusic	4/5 stars
Alternative Press	9/10
The Boston Phoenix	3/4 stars
Muzik	4/5
NME	8/10
Pitchfork	5.3/10
Rolling Stone	3.5/5 stars
Spin	8/10

Tim DiGravina of AllMusic gave the album 4 stars out of 5, calling it "an accomplished slice of soulful genius that rewards frequent spins." He said, "the duo of Henry Binns and Sam Hardaker mix a number of musical elements, such as soul-influenced diva vocals, gurgling and ringing keyboards, and classical string arrangements, into a relaxing, potent wave of sounds." Matt Diehl of Rolling Stone gave the album 3.5 stars out of 5, saying, "More like jazz on acid than acid jazz, Simple Things can be hallucinatory yet eminently listenable; it's chill-out music with a little something for your mind as well." For Rob Mitchum, writing for Pitchfork, the album was too similar to Air's Moon Safari.

== Track listing ==
No.	Title	Writer(s)	Length
1.	"I Have Seen" (The Peddlers cover)	Roy Phillips	5:07
2.	"Polaris"	Henry Binns; Sam Hardaker	4:48
3.	"Destiny"	Henry Binns; Sam Hardaker; Sophie Barker; Sia Furler	5:38
4.	"Give It Away"	Henry Binns; Sam Hardaker	5:17
5.	"Simple Things"	Henry Binns; Sam Hardaker; Osmond Wright	4:24
6.	"Red Dust"	Henry Binns; Sam Hardaker	5:40
7.	"Distractions"	Henry Binns; Sam Hardaker; Sia Furler	5:16
8.	"In the Waiting Line"	Henry Binns; Sam Hardaker; Sophie Barker	4:35
9.	"Out of Town"	Henry Binns; Sam Hardaker	4:48
10.	"This World"	Henry Binns; Sam Hardaker; Osmond Wright	5:37
11.	"Likufanele"	George Martin; Primrose Nyoka; Zandile Mayekiso	6:24
12.	"End Theme"	Daryl Runswick	3:38
Total length:			61:14

US edition bonus tracks
No.	Title	Writer(s)	Length
13.	"Salt Water Sound"	Henry Binns; Sam Hardaker	5:30
14.	"Spinning"	Henry Binns; Sam Hardaker; Sophie Barker	6:03
Total length:			74:47

Japanese edition bonus tracks
No.	Title	Writer(s)	Length
13.	"Salt Water Sound"	Henry Binns; Sam Hardaker	5:30
14.	"Spinning"	Henry Binns; Sam Hardaker; Sophie Barker	6:03
15.	"Monday Night"	Henry Binns; Sam Hardaker	6:55
Total length:			79:39

Australian edition bonus disc
No.	Title	Length
1.	"Destiny (Photek Remix)"	7:13
2.	"In the Waiting Line (Dorfmeister Con Madrid De Los Austrias Dub)"	6:42
3.	"Spinning Dub"	5:25
4.	"In the Waiting Line (Aquanote's Naked Adaption)"	6:43
5.	"Salt Water Sound"	5:32
6.	"End Theme (Roni's Tear It Down Remix)"	7:58
Total length:		38:22

== In popular culture ==
- "In the Waiting Line" appeared in the season 6 episode, "The Domino Effect" of Sex and the City, in the season 3 episode of House "Needle in a Haystack", and in the 2004 film Garden State and on its soundtrack.
- "Destiny" appeared in the 2002 film Blue Crush, as well as the 2009 film Obsessed.
- “Give It Away” was used as a background track on the CBBC show SMart when sharing viewers' artwork that had been sent in the previous week.

== Personnel ==
Credits adapted from liner notes.

- Zero 7 – production, mixing
- Demus – mixing (3, 5)
- Mozez – vocals (1, 5, 10)
- Sia Furler – vocals (3, 7)
- Sophie Barker – vocals (3, 8, 14)
- Philani Mothers - vocals (11)
- Dedi Madden – guitar (1, 7, 8)
- Allan Simpson – guitar (3, 4, 6)
- Phil Thornalley – guitar (9), bass guitar (9)
- Pete Trotman – bass guitar (1, 2, 3, 4, 6, 7, 8, 12)
- Max Beesley – Rhodes piano (5)
- The Brilliant Strings – strings (1, 4, 5, 6, 12)
- Sally Herbert – violin (1, 7, 10, 11)
- Graeme Stewart – trumpet (4, 6)
- Simon Elms – trumpet (9)
- Dan Litman – flute (6)
- Jeremy Stacey – drums (1, 8, 12)
- Miggi Barradas – drums (4)
- Ollie Savill – percussion (2)
- Jenny Arrel – percussion (11)
- House – design

== Charts ==
=== Weekly charts ===
Chart (2001)	Peak position
UK Albums (OCC)	28
US Top Dance/Electronic Albums (Billboard)	4
US Heatseekers Albums (Billboard)	20
US Independent Albums (Billboard)	21

=== Year-end charts ===
Chart (2001)	Position
UK Albums (OCC)	119
Chart (2002)	Position
Canadian Alternative Albums (Nielsen SoundScan)	101
UK Albums (OCC)	123

== Certifications and sales ==
Region	Certification	Certified units/sales
United Kingdom (BPI)	Platinum	300,000^{*}
United States	—	165,000
Summaries
Worldwide	—	800,000
^{*} Sales figures based on certification alone.
