= Destiny (Zero 7 song) =

2001 single by Zero 7

Single by Zero 7

from the album Simple Things
- Released: 6 August 2001
- Genre: Downtempo
- Length: 5:38 (album version); 3:47 (radio edit)
- Label: Ultimate Dilemma
- Songwriters: Sophie Barker; Henry Binns; Sia Furler; Sam Hardaker
- Producer: Zero 7

Zero 7 singles chronology
"I Have Seen" (2001)	"Destiny" (2001)	"End Theme" (2001)

Sia singles chronology
"Drink to Get Drunk" (2001)	"Destiny" (2001)	"Distractions" (2002)

Music video
- "Destiny" on YouTube

"Destiny" is a song by English downtempo music duo Zero 7, written and produced by Zero 7 members Henry Binns and Sam Hardaker. After writing the music, the team recruited British singer-songwriter Sophie Barker, who provided additional writing. Zero 7 then met Australian singer Sia, whose manager recommended her to the duo, and she became the track's fourth writer. The song, a downtempo ballad, is about two separated romantics who wish to be with each other again, with one of the partners more desperate to interact with the other. Sia and Barker contribute to the vocal performances, with Sia singing the verses and choruses while Barker duets with Sia during the choruses. The song was included on Zero 7's debut studio album, Simple Things, which was released on 23 April 2001.

"Destiny" was later released as a single in the United Kingdom on 6 August 2001. Music critics responded positively to the song, calling it "extraordinary" and "unforgettable" with "dulcet" and "smoldering" vocals, although one reviewer criticised the track for being "too nice". On 12 August 2001, the song debuted at its peak of number 30 on the UK Singles Chart, remaining in the top 100 for three weeks. It also received airplay on adult album alternative radio stations in the United States, reaching number 26 on the Radio & Records Triple A Top 30 chart. Several music videos were made to promote the song. One video, directed by Tommy Pallotta, incorporates rotoscoping techniques and received the most rotation on video networks. This video illustrates several morose individuals walking around a city, passing by many romantic couples displaying their love for each other.

== Background ==
Zero 7 came to public attention after creating a dub remix of "Climbing Up the Walls", a song from English rock band Radiohead's third studio album, OK Computer (1997). They followed up with another remix, this time reworking "Love Theme from Spartacus" by American singer-songwriter Terry Callier. The duo then released their first extended play, EP1, in 2000; only 1,000 copies were issued, which sold out within a few days. Afterwards, the twosome began to work on their first full album, which would include several tracks from EP1.

Henry Binns explained to Helen Brown of British newspaper The Independent that after he and Zero 7 partner Sam Hardaker had composed the music for their debut studio album, Simple Things, they began to search for singers, one of whom was "Destiny" vocalist and writer Sophie Barker. She had been performing music around London during the album's creation, and after Zero 7 attended one her shows, they asked her to be a vocalist on Simple Things, to which she agreed. Afterwards, most of the album's material was complete, but Zero 7 believed that "Destiny", then an instrumental, was missing a certain quality. At the time, Hardaker played association football with Sia's manager, and although Hardaker initially reacted reluctantly to the manager's proposition to feature her on the track, he soon discovered that Sia was the vocalist for whom they had been searching. With her help, they penned the lyrics for two songs in one afternoon: "Distractions" and "Destiny". According to Binns, he was amazed that Sia had managed to work with so little complication. He stated, "She worked so fast – was so completely in the moment. If you didn't catch her vocal on the first take you worried it might never happen." In a 2020 interview with music magazine The Big Takeover, Binns recalled that having Sia as a vocalist "spoiled" him and Hardaker.

== Composition and lyrics ==
"Destiny"
A sample of the opening of "Destiny", displaying Sia's low vocals and the song's "placid" tone.

A downtempo torch song and ballad, "Destiny" is composed in C Phrygian mode, which is the third mode of the A-flat major scale. The chorus follows the chord progression of E♭6–dm7–D♭maj7–C. Rachel Brodsky of Spin magazine called the tone of the track "placid". Sia sings the verses while Barker accompanies her during the choruses. The song tells the story of two lovers who are separated, with the narrator living in isolation while away from home and pining for her partner's company. Bored and homesick, she resorts to watching pornography in her hotel room. Even then, she continues to draw strength from her lover, as she believes they were destined to be together.

== Critical reception ==
Angelo De Robertis of Italian contemporary hit radio station Radio 105 praised the song, saying, "It's an extraordinary record," and comparing it to the works of French music duo Air. In a November 2001 review of Simple Things for Billboard magazine, Michael Paoletta said that "Destiny" (along with another album track, "In the Waiting Line") could "comfort those in need of TLC". In a later Billboard review, published in January 2002, he went on to compliment the "smoldering" vocals of Sia and Barker and wrote that the track was "chilled to perfection". Robb Patryk of American online magazine SoulTracks said of "Destiny", "The track has a swirling, trip-hoppy vibe, and Sia lays her incredibly supple and soulful voice atop it like whipped cream". Radio & Records named in their "Record of the Week" on their 1 February 2002 issue, with columnist Katy Stephan referring to the song as "more comfortable than a sofa," noting its smooth vocals, rich melody, and chilling loops. Another Radio & Records columnist, Dan Reed, praised the way in which the voices of Sia and Barker blend during the chorus.

Smooth Radio writer Tom Eames ranked "Destiny" as Zero 7's best track. BBC writer Christian Hopwood called Sia's vocals "dulcet" and praised her collaboration with Barker. Lily Moayeri of American music magazine Under the Radar also praised Zero 7's alliance with Sia, labelling the song as "unforgettable". Reviewing the parent album for music website Sit Down/Listen Up, Thom Lieb said that "Destiny" would be a "great" song for weddings if not for the opening lines about watching pornography. Stephen Dalton of British website NME wrote that while the song was not bad, it would satisfy only a particular audience for being "too nice" and a sleep-inducing track.

== Release and promotion ==
"Destiny" was included as the third track on Simple Things, released on 23 April 2001 to high anticipation, and was issued as the album's second single on 6 August 2001. The song made its debut on the UK Singles Chart at number 30 on 12 August 2001. On 19 August, the song fell to number 46, then dropped to number 55 during its third and final week on the UK chart. It is Zero 7's only song to peak within the top 40, and it was Sia's second song to enter the top 40, following her debut single, "Taken for Granted", in 2000; she would not return to the top 40 until January 2012, when her collaboration with French DJ David Guetta, "Titanium", rose into the top 10. In Scotland, the song peaked at number 35 on the week of its debut and also stayed within the top 100 of the Scottish Singles Chart for three weeks. On the UK Indie Chart, which ranks songs released on independent record labels, the song attained a peak of number two. As of November 2018, "Destiny" has garnered over 5.7 million streams in the UK alone since the Official Charts Company began tracking streams in 2014, and the song was certified silver by the British Phonographic Industry in July 2021 for sales and streams exceeding 200,000 units.

The animated music video uses rotoscoping techniques and warm colouration. A dismal woman passes by a cuddling couple.

Internationally, the single's British sales alone registered on the Eurochart Hot 100 on Music & Media's 25 August 2001 issue, when it appeared at number 99. In the United States, the song was first added to national adult album alternative radio stations in November 2001. Following a large number of radio additions on the week of 11 February 2002, "Destiny" debuted at number 27 on the Radio & Records Triple A Top 30 Indicator listing on 22 February 2002. As its airplay increased, it eventually dropped out of the indicator chart and entered the main Triple A Top 30 ranking, where it debuted and peaked at number 26 on 7 June 2002.

Several music videos were created for the song. One of them, directed by Tommy Pallotta, features rotoscoping, a process in which live-action footage is traced over frame-by-frame, turning it into an animated film; it was this video that received plentiful airplay. It is mostly animated in black and white, although it does feature sporadic red, orange, and yellow colouration. The video shows several downtrodden individuals travelling around a city, encountering romantic couples of all ages socialising, cuddling, kissing, or interacting with their children. The video completely colourises as it ends, showing a depressed woman staring out of a window.

== Track listings ==
UK CD1

1. "Destiny" (radio edit)
2. "Destiny" (Photek remix radio edit)
3. "End Theme" (Roni Size remix)

UK CD2

1. "Destiny" (full length version)
2. "Destiny" (Hefner's Destinys Chill)
3. "Destiny" (Simian Remix)

UK and US 12-inch single

A1. "Destiny" (full length)
A2. "Destiny" (Hefner's Destinys Chill)
B1. "Destiny" (Photek remix)

European maxi-CD single

1. "Destiny" (radio edit)
2. "Destiny" (Hefner's Destinys Chill)
3. "Destiny" (Photek remix)
4. "End Theme" (Roni Size remix)

== Charts ==
Weekly chart performance for "Destiny"
Chart (2001–2002)	Peak position
Europe (Eurochart Hot 100)	99
Scotland Singles (OCC)	35
UK Singles (OCC)	30
UK Indie (OCC)	2
US Triple A Top 30 (Radio & Records)	26

== Certifications ==
Certifications and sales for "Destiny"
Region	Certification	Certified units/sales
United Kingdom (BPI)	Silver	200,000^{‡}
^{‡} Sales+streaming figures based on certification alone.

== Release history ==
Release dates and formats for "Destiny"
Region	Date	Format(s)	Label(s)	ID	Ref.
United Kingdom	6 August 2001	CD: CD1	Ultimate Dilemma	UDRCDS043	
United Kingdom	6 August 2001	CD: CD2	Ultimate Dilemma	UDRCDSX043	
United Kingdom	6 August 2001	12-inch vinyl	Ultimate Dilemma	UDR 043	
Europe	2001	Maxi-CD	Ultimate Dilemma; PIAS	726.0043.122; CMV 5 0043.22.726 [CD]; 081PS; UDRCDS043	
United States	2001	12-inch vinyl	Quango; Palm Pictures; Giant Step	GSTP 7020-1	
