= Eska (singer) =

British singer-songwriter and multi-instrumentalist (born 1971)

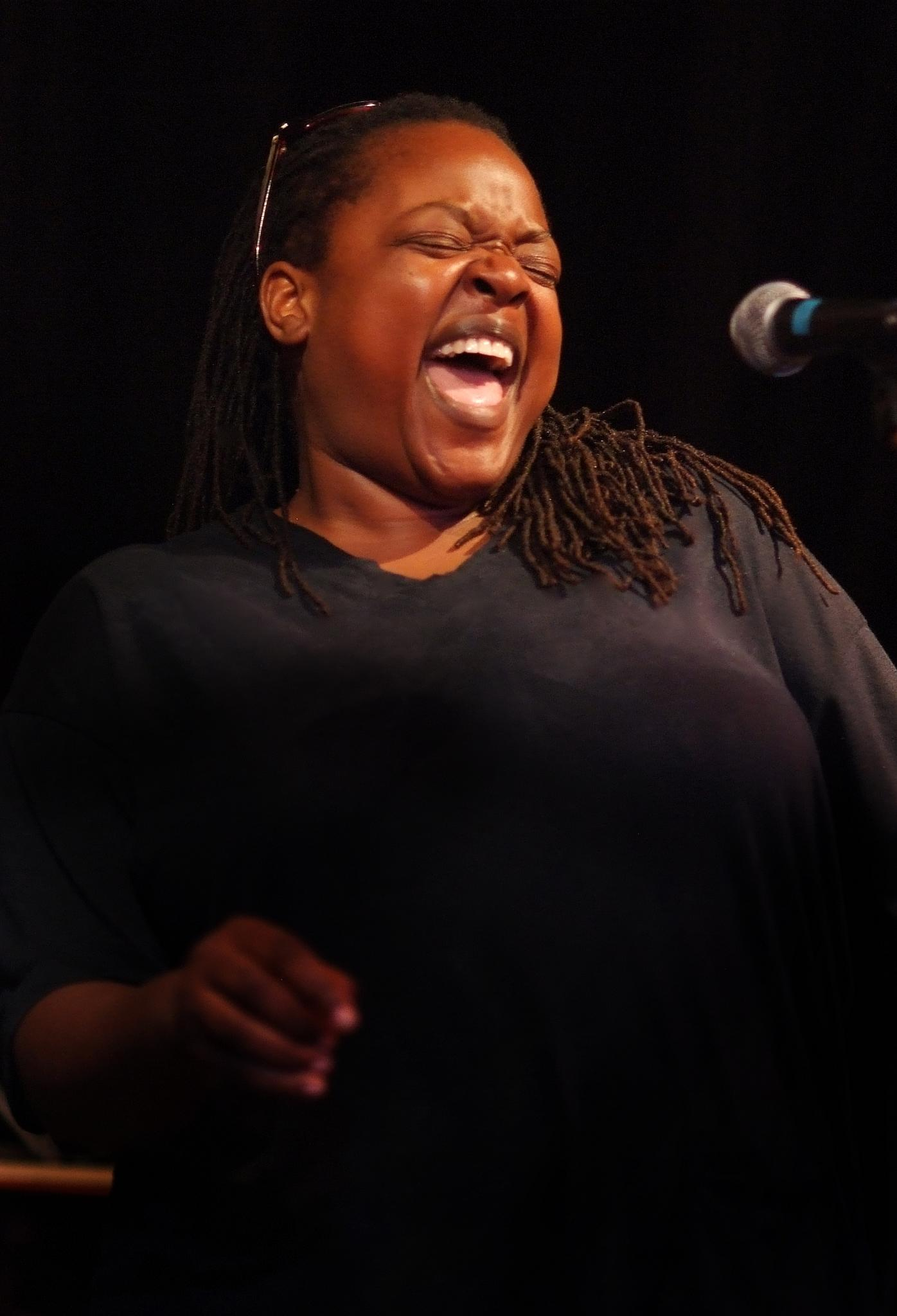
- Eska in 2008

Background information
- Born: Eska Mtungwazi; 1971 (age 54–55)
- Origin: Lewisham, London, England
- Genres: Folk; soul; jazz; dance
- Occupations: Singer-songwriter; record producer; session musician
- Instruments: Vocals; guitar; violin; piano
- Years active: 1998–present
- Label: Earthling
- Website: eskaonline.com

Eska Gillian Mtungwazi (born 1971), known mononymously as Eska, is a British singer-songwriter and multi-instrumentalist. Following her inaugural release as a solo artist with her 2013 Gatekeeper EP, her self-titled debut album, Eska, was released on 27 April 2015.

== Early and personal life ==
Born in 1971, Mtungwazi grew up in Lewisham, South-East London, England. She was raised by her Zimbabwean parents, who relocated the family to London when she was two years old. She cites Quincy Jones as being particularly influential during her youth. With the assistance of her teachers, she began learning the violin, earning herself a scholarship at the Conservatoire in Blackheath. She is also an alumnus of the music education and artist development organization Tomorrow's Warriors.

== Life and career ==
After gaining a Bachelor of Science degree in Mathematics from the London School of Economics, Mtungwazi became a mathematics and music teacher. During this time, she performed as a backup singer on other musicians' projects. She has worked with other established British artists and bands, including Grace Jones, Bobby McFerrin, Zero 7, UNKLE, Kae Tempest, Shabaka Hutchings, Nitin Sawhney, Matthew Herbert, and Baxter Dury.

Mtungwazi received vocal credits on independent releases throughout the 2000s, and in 2013 released her debut solo project, Gatekeeper EP, through her self-owned label, Earthling Recordings. The EP (co-produced by Matthew Herbert and David Okumu) included five original tracks. It received critical acclaim from various musicians, including DJ Gilles Peterson and Jamie Cullum. Additionally, the title track was also selected by Peterson for his Brownswood Bubblers 10 compilation, released on Brownswood Recordings.

In June 2022, Mtungwazi provided the support act for Grace Jones at the Meltdown festival in London's Southbank Centre.

In March 2026, Eska was announced by Tomorrow's Warriors as one of the charity's 12 inaugural patrons, the others being Baroness Amos, Margaret Busby, Guy Chambers, Nick Hornby, Robert Elms, Lizzie Ridding and John Ridding, Michael Watt, Richard Wyatt, Femi Koleoso and Moses Boyd.

=== Eska ===
Mtungwazi released her self-titled debut album, Eska, on 26 April 2015, later nominated for the 2015 Mercury Music Prize.

=== The Ordinary Life of a Magic Woman ===
Almost 10 years after her debut album's release, Mtungwazi released her sophomore album, The Ordinary Life of a Magic Woman, in April/May 2025. In a BBC Radio 6 Music interview with Gilles Peterson, she stated that releasing the vinyl first was a conscious decision "based on the principle that films go out to cinema first, so why in music don't we do the same?" The album was preceded by the release of four digital singles: "Down Here", "Magic Woman", "Human", and "Daddy Long Legs". The album is a mix of alternative rock and electronic sounds.

== Discography ==
=== Albums ===
- Eska (2015)
- The Ordinary Life of a Magic Woman (2025)

=== EPs ===
- Gatekeeper EP (2013)

=== Singles ===
==== As a main artist ====
- "Rock of Ages" (2015), Earthling Recordings
- "Shades of Blue" (2015), Earthling Recordings
- "Many People of the Songbird" (with Jesse Hackett and Louis Hackett) (2016), Gearbox
- "Down Here" (2025)
- "Magic Woman" (2025)
- "Human" (2025)
- "Daddy Long Legs" (2025)

==== As a featured artist ====
- "What U Do" (with Colours / Stephen Emmanuel) (1998), Inferno – UK No. 51
- "Coochy Coo" (as En-Core with Stephen Emmanuel) (2000), Ice Cream Records – UK No. 32
- "Home" (with Uschi Classen) (2000), Earth Project
- "Sunset" (with Nitin Sawhney) (2001), V2 Records – UK No. 65
- "Rocc It 2nite" (with Quango) (2004), People
- "The Way We Like It" (with Natalie Williams & Ty) (2006), East Side Records
- ”Still Here” (with Stanton Warriors) (2006)
- "Dirty Basement" (with Elektrons) (2007), Genuine/PIAS Recordings/Wall of Sound
- "Monosabio Blues" (with Gecko Turner) (2007), LoveMonk
- "Mr McGee", "Medicine Man", "Sleeper" and "The Road" (with Zero 7) (2009), Atlantic
