= Zero 7 =

English musical duo

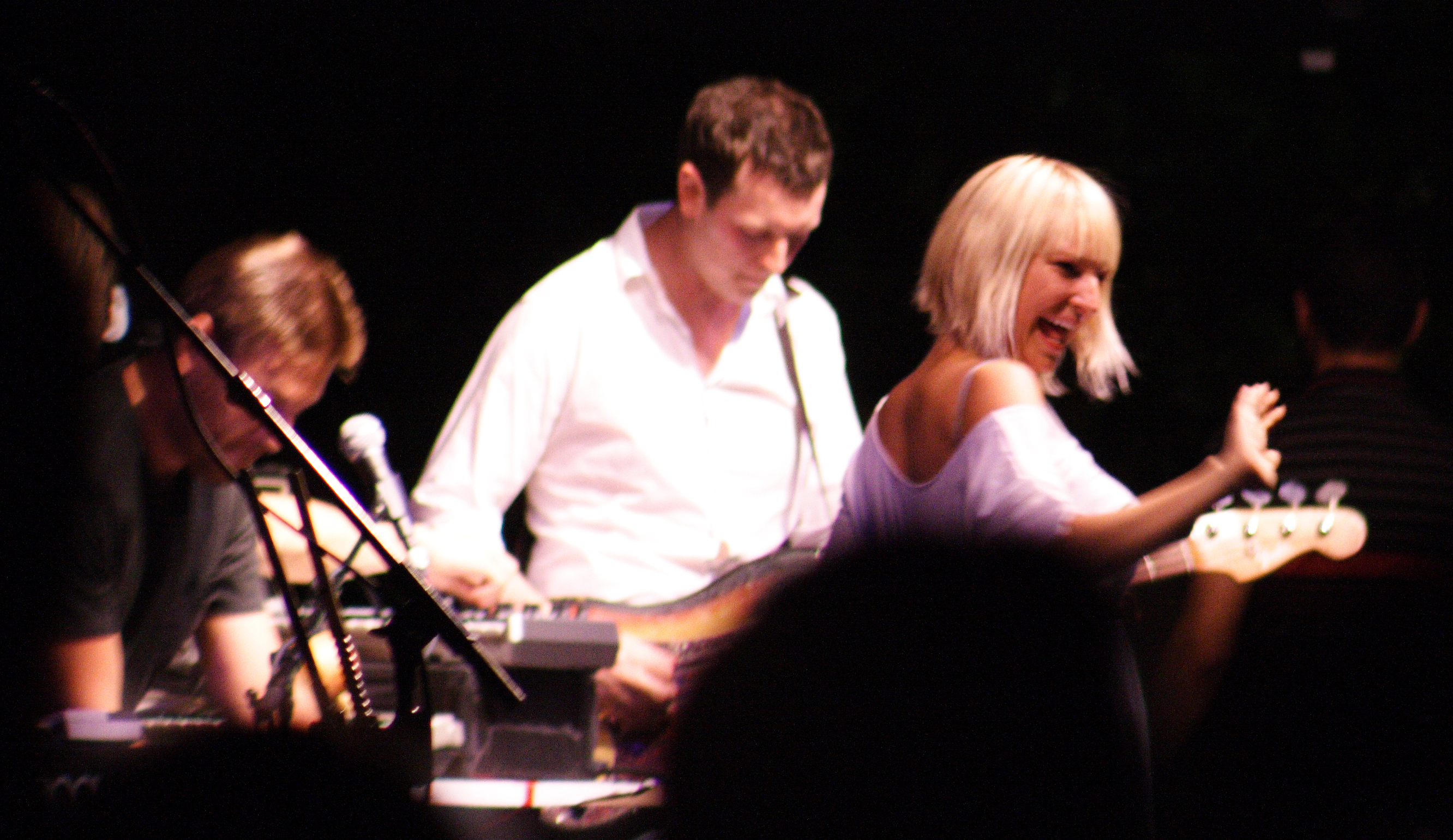
- (L–R) Band members Henry Binns and Sam Hardaker, with frequent collaborator Sia in 2006

Background information
- Origin: London, England
- Genres: Trip hop; electronica; downtempo; acid jazz; ambient; chill-out
- Years active: 1997–present
- Labels: Ultimate Dilemma; Palm; Elektra; Atlantic; Make
- Members: Henry Binns; Sam Hardaker
- Website: zero7.co.uk

Zero 7 is an English musical duo consisting of Henry Binns and Sam Hardaker that formed in 1997. Their debut album, Simple Things, was released in 2001; their song "Destiny" stayed in the top 100 of the UK Single Charts. Subsequent albums include When It Falls, The Garden, and Yeah Ghost.

After studying sound engineering, Binns and Hardaker began their careers in the music industry in the 1990s at Mickie Most's RAK Studios in London, engineering music for British groups like Pet Shop Boys, Young Disciples, and Robert Plant. In 1997 they created a remix of the song "Climbing Up the Walls" by Radiohead (which was also the first time the name 'Zero 7' was used), and provided additional programming on "Meeting in the Aisle", a Karma Police B-side, and Binns received a credit for additional sampling on Kid A. The pair also remixed Terry Callier's "Love Theme From Spartacus" and songs by Lenny Kravitz, Sneaker Pimps and Lambchop.

== History ==
The name Zero 7 was chosen after Binns and Hardaker spent time on the Honduran island Utila, which contained a bar named Cero Siete. After returning to the UK they were asked by Radiohead to remix the song "Climbing Up the Walls". Binns and Hardaker called their mix "the Zero 7 Mix", and the name stuck.

In 1999, they released an EP of original material called EP 1 under the name Zero 7. In 2001, they released their debut album, Simple Things, which featured collaborations with vocalists Mozez, Sia, and Sophie Barker. The album peaked at number 28 on the UK albums chart and went platinum. It was later nominated for the Mercury Music Prize and won the "Best Newcomer" Muzik Award. Live appearances after the album's release consisted of Binns and Hardaker along with guest vocalists and other musicians, with as many as 20 performers on stage at once.

In 2004, they released their second album, When It Falls. In addition to the three vocalists from their first album, it featured a collaboration with Danish singer-songwriter Tina Dico. It peaked at number 3 on the UK albums chart, their highest charting to date, and became a certified gold record. That same year, Binns co-wrote the Emma Bunton track "Breathing".

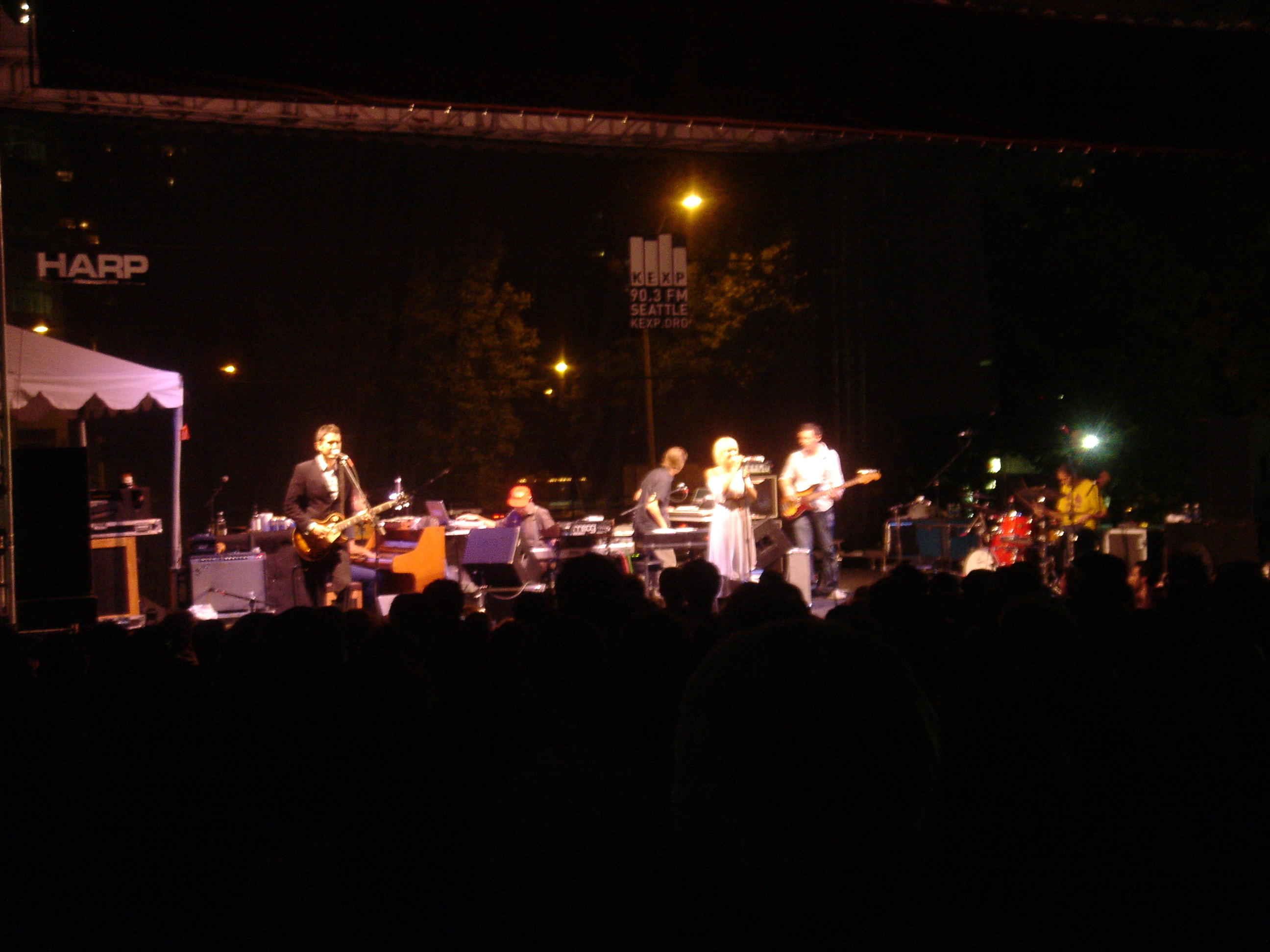
Zero 7 at Bumbershoot in 2006

Zero 7 released their third album, The Garden, in May 2006, which contained vocals performed by Binns as well as guest vocalists Sia and Swedish folk musician José González. The album was named after the collage that artist friend Gideon London produced for its cover.

In 2007, Binns and Hardaker created a band called Ingrid Eto, which has been described as a Zero 7 instrumental project. In 2009, they released an experimental instrumental EP under the name Kling, titled Kling EP. Its tracks were later incorporated into Zero 7's fourth album, Yeah Ghost, also released in 2009. The album included contributions from jazz and soul singer Eska Mtungwazi as well as folk artist Martha Tilston.

In 2010, the duo released a retrospective compilation titled Record. A two-disc special edition contained exclusive remixes of songs from all four of their prior studio albums. In 2013, the band released a 12" single, "On My Own" b/w "Don't Call It Love", on their own label, Make Records.

In 2014, the band released the Simple Science EP, followed by EP3 in 2015. Both were released on Make Records.

In 2016, Henry Binns teamed up with Bo Bruce and Jodi Milliner to form a group called Equador.

At the end of 2018, Zero 7 released the track "Mono" featuring Hidden. This was followed at the beginning of 2019 by "Aurora". In October 2019, the duo released another single titled "Swimmers" with additional vocals courtesy of UK based singer Jem Cooke. Later in August 2020, the band released another single, "Shadows", and announced an upcoming EP. In October 2020, the Shadows EP was released, containing 4 tracks by singer-songwriter Lou Stone.

In March 2024, Zero 7 teased new music via social media. Then on 3 April they released their first new single, "The Crowd", from forthcoming album with California west coast based artist Swim Surreal. They followed this with their second single "Bloom" released on 15 May. On 5 June they released "Don't Call it Love" along with a video. Finally, 21 June saw the release of the full-length album In the Half Light, a nine-song collaboration with Swim Surreal. All songs were co-written and produced by Zero 7, essentially comprising the fifth Zero 7 album, their first since 2009.

== Discography ==
- Simple Things (2001)
- When It Falls (2004)
- The Garden (2006)
- Yeah Ghost (2009)
- In The Half Light (with Swim Surreal, 2024)

== Awards ==
- Nominated for the Mercury Prize 2001 for Simple Things.
- Nominated for Best British Newcomer at the Brit Awards 2002.
- Nominated for a 2007 Grammy Award for The Garden, in the category 'Best Electronic/Dance Album'.

== See also ==
- List of downtempo artists
- List of trip hop artists
