= Victorian Farmers Federation =

Australian farmer lobby group

The Victorian Farmers Federation (VFF) is an Australian non-profit membership based advocacy and lobby group that represents farmers in Victoria. The organisation represents its members in lobbying state and federal government on policy matters that affect farmers and regional communities. The VFF is a member organisation of the national farm lobby group the National Farmers Federation.

In response to the need to unite all farm lobby groups, the VFF was founded in 1979 as the Victorian Farmers and Graziers Association (VFGA) – the merger of three organisations: the Victorian Farmers Union (VFU), the Graziers Association of Victoria (GAV) and the United Dairyfarmers of Victoria (UDV).

== History ==
=== Farmer unity in Victoria ===
In 1840, the Australia Felix Pastoral and Agricultural Society was founded in Melbourne. It held its first agricultural show in 1842, which was a failure. It disbanded soon after.

The Moonee Ponds Farmers' Society began in 1848, and within months had expanded its scope and became the Port Phillip Farmers' Society, aiming to serve the Port Phillip District. (This group held the first events now considered to be the Melbourne Show.) Further independent agricultural associations formed in various parts of the District soon after. In 1856, the Port Phillip group founded the "Agricultural Club" to discuss agricultural matters, and this served as a think-tank which influenced farmers across the state. In 1866, a short lived Victorian Farmers' Association was established.

By 1870 there was no Victoria-wide farming group, and the National Agricultural Society of Victoria was founded in that year to represent farmers' interests. This organisation took over the running of Melbourne's main agricultural show in 1871, and continues to do so to this day, and this has been its main purpose for most of its existence.

The first Victorian Farmers Union (VFU) was founded in 1879, in response to 1878 Victorian closer settlement legislation. It ceased in 1880. Its role was taken up by the Victorian Farmers' Protectionist Association, founded in 1887, and becoming known as the Victorian Farmers' Association in 1891 before also fading away. The similar Victorian Chamber of Agriculture then existed from 1899 to 1900.

The second VFU existed under that name from 1914 to 1927. In 1926, a large number of Mallee wheat farmer VFU branches broke away from this body to become the Primary Producer's Union, (with some additional support in other parts of the state). The VFU broadened its membership to include non-farmers who lived in country areas, and became the Victorian Country Party in 1927. Despite the contribution these organisations made to representing farmers' interests in Victoria, they are not considered as forerunners to the modern VFF.

Instead, today's VFF traces its roots back to the VFU established in 1968 following the merger of the Victorian Wheat and Woolgrowers Association (VWWA) established in 1938, and the Victorian Branch of the Australian Primary Producers Union (APUV) established in 1940.

The Graziers Association of Victoria's roots went as far back as 1890, when during a shearing turmoil, the Pastoralists Union of Victoria and Southern Riverina was formed. The main concern at that time was the strength of the Amalgamated Shearers Union and it became apparent that pastoralists had to unite as a counter measure. In 1907 the Riverina farmers split to form a separate organisation and some 18 years later, in 1925, the Pastoral Association of Victoria became known as the Graziers Association of Victoria (GAV).

The Victorian Dairy Farmers Association was founded in the late 1800s. It merged with the dairy division of the VFU in 1976 to form the United Dairyfarmers of Victoria (UDV).

In 1979 the VFU, GAV and UDV merged to form the Victorian Farmers and Graziers Association (VFGA),

In 1986 the VFGA changed its name to the Victorian Farmers Federation to come into line with the other national and state farming organisations.

=== Fighting for a fair go ===
During the 1980s, the introduction of wide combs for shearing caused enormous unrest in the pastoral industry as did the so-called 'Mudginberri dispute' which became a landmark in terms of challenging the labour efficiency in abattoirs. The VFGA was very proactive and lobbied hard on both these issues. A crippling drought in 1982/83 caused enormous hardship for Victorian farmers. Again the VFGA fought hard for its members. Farmers gained access to subsidies for fodder and also for transport of livestock and fodder.

Victorian farmers were becoming increasingly restless and frustrated. They believed that neither the government nor the general public understood their plight. An enormous rally, organised by Benalla farmer Ian Cuming and involving about 40,000 farmers, paraded through the streets of Melbourne in June 1985 under the banner of 'Farmers Fighting for a Fair Go'. This display of unity and determination established a firm base from which to lobby both state and federal governments and helped bridge the gap between city and country people. The Melbourne rally was followed by a national farmer rally in Canberra which led to the establishment of the NFF's 'Farmers Fighting Fund'. This fund has helped finance various significant campaigns waged by Australian farmers.

=== VFF and Landcare ===
Under its first female president Heather Mitchell OBE, the VFF became instrumental in the formation of Landcare. Landcare was created in 1986 and grew from groups of Victorian farmers coming together to tackle natural resource management issues on a district and regional basis. The VFF retains a very a close link with the Victorian Landcare network. There are now about 1,000 Landcare groups and over 20,000 Landcare members in Victoria, most of whom are also VFF members.

== Structure ==
The VFF has approximately 200 branches spread across the state to which all its members belong.

All members are part of a Commodity Group which have their own Policy Councils and representation on the VFF Board of Directors.

The VFF consists of seven Commodity Groups

- Dairy (United Dairyfarmers of Victoria)
- Livestock
- Grains
- Horticulture (incorporating Flowers Victoria)
- Chicken Meat
- Eggs
- Pigs.

The President and vice-president of the Federation are democratically elected by members every two years at the VFF Annual Conference.

The Policy Council is chaired by the President and includes representatives from each Commodity Group and the Chairs of its sub-committees: Water Council, Farm Business & Regional Development Committee, Ag Vet Chemicals Committee and the VFFIA.

The Victorian Farmers Federation Industrial Association (VFFIA) is a registered organisation under the Fair Work Act and represents members of the VFF in employment matters.

== Farrer House ==
Since its foundation the headquarters of the VFF has been located at 24-28 Collins Street, Melbourne, in close proximity to Victoria's Parliament House and other government offices. In 1949 the Victorian Wheat and Woolgrowers Association (VWWA) purchased a 4-storey building at 26-28 Collins Street. In 1951 the VWWA resolved to name the building 'Farrer House' in honour of the pioneering Australian agronomist and plant breeder William Farrer. In 1967 the VWWA purchased the remaining terrace building at 24 Collins Street and works began to demolish the buildings to be replaced with the present multi-storey office building.

== Past Presidents ==
Name	Term start	Term end	
Miles Burke	1979	1982	Grain farmer (Mallee)
Des Crowe	1982	1986	Cattle producer (South West)
Heather Mitchell OBE	1986	1989	Grain farmer (Wimmera)
Alex Arbuthnot OA	1989	1992	Dairy farmer (Gippsland)
Bill Bodman OAM	1992	1995	Cattle producer (Gippsland)
Wally Shaw	1995	1998	Chicken farmer (Mornington Peninsula)
Peter Walsh	1998	2002	Tomato and grain farmer (Northern Victoria)
Paul Weller	2002	2005	Dairy farmer (Northern Victoria)
Simon Ramsay	2005	2009	Livestock producer (Western District)
Andrew Broad	2009	2012	Grain farmer (Northern Victoria)
Peter Touhey	2012	2016	Grain farmer (Northern Victoria)
David Jochinke	2016	2020	Grain farmer (Wimmera)
Emma Germano	2020	2024	Horticulture and livestock farmer (Gippsland)
Brett Hosking	2024	2026	Grain and livestock farmer (Mallee)
Ryan Milgate	2026		Grain Farmer (Wimmera)
