= Winston Crane =

Australian politician

Senator for Western Australia
- In office 1 July 1990 – 30 June 2002

Personal details
- Born: 21 August 1941 (age 84) Perth, Western Australia
- Party: Liberal
- Relations: Bert Crane (uncle)
- Occupation: Farmer, grazier

Arthur Winston Crane (born 21 August 1941) is a former Australian politician. Born in Perth, Western Australia, he was a farmer and grazier, and served as Senior Vice-President of the National Farmers' Federation. In 1990, he was elected to the Australian Senate as a Liberal Senator from Western Australia. For the 2001 election, he was demoted to fourth place on the Liberal ticket, replaced by the State President of the WA Liberal Party, David Johnston. Crane was defeated; his term expired in 2002.

== Early life ==
Crane was born in Perth on 21 August 1941. He is the son of Lavina (née Longman) and Arthur Crane. His uncle Bert Crane was a state MP.

Crane was raised on his family's Wheatbelt farming property at Bindi Bindi, Western Australia. He attended the local state school and then boarded at Guildford Grammar School in Perth until the age of 15. After leaving school he worked as a contractor and shearer. He eventually purchased a property at Jerdacuttup.

== Farming advocacy ==
Crane was a founder of the Jerdacuttup branch of the Farmers' Union of Western Australia and was elected to the union's executive in 1973. He served as president of the union from 1982 to 1989, by which time it had changed its name to the Western Australian Farmers Federation. He was also a member of the executive of the National Farmers' Federation (NFF) from 1978 and served as senior vice president under Ian McLachlan from 1987 to 1989.

Crane served as chairman of the NFF's industrial committee in the 1980s, successfully lobbying for the right of farmers to establish their own superannuation funds. During his tenure the NFF was involved with a number of industrial conflicts with trade unions, including the Wide Comb dispute, the Mudginberri dispute, and the CBH Group waterside dispute in Geraldton. Crane was also chairman of the NFF's fertiliser task force, lobbying for the continuance of phosphate subsidies for farmers and opposing the Hawke government's plans to impose a duty on fertiliser imports. He also led the NFF's campaign committee at the 1987 federal election, with the stated aim of increasing the organisation's political presence by lobbying candidates to adopt NFF policies.

== Politics ==
In 1989, Crane won Liberal Party preselection as the third candidate on the party's Senate ticket in Western Australia. He was elected to the Senate at the 1990 federal election to a six-year term beginning on 1 July 1990. He was re-elected at the 1996 election as the Liberal Party's lead candidate in Western Australia.

Crane was a shadow parliamentary secretary from 1993 to 1996. He served on a number of Senate committees, notably as chair of the rural and regional affairs and transport legislation committee from 1996 to 2002. In parliament he spoke frequently on the wool industry and "participated in debates on a range of bills, directing his attention to industrial relations, transport, environmental conservation and primary industry, including matters pertaining to agricultural research and development and trade".

In 1998, the Australian Federal Police (AFP) launched an investigation into allegations that Crane had misused his parliamentary travel allowance in relation to charter flights between Perth and his home in Jerdacuttup. The investigation concluded in 2002, with the Commonwealth Director of Public Prosecutions advising there was insufficient evidence to support the allegations of misuse. As part of the investigation, the AFP took out search warrants and seized documents from Crane's office and home. Crane subsequently alleged the document seizures had breached parliamentary privilege, with the Federal Court ordering that the seized documents be presented to the president of the Senate to determine whether a breach had occurred.

Crane was placed in the "unwinnable" fourth position on the Liberal Party's Senate ticket at the 2001 election, which was attributed to the AFP investigation and factional conflict. He was defeated for re-election with his term expiring on 30 June 2002.
