= Dominion (2018 film) =

- Film poster
- Directed by: Chris Delforce
- Written by: Chris Delforce
- Produced by: Chris Delforce, Matthew Lynch, Farm Transparency Project
- Narrated by: Joaquin Phoenix; Rooney Mara; Sadie Sink; Sia; Kat Von D
- Edited by: Chris Delforce
- Music by: Asher Pope
- Release dates: 29 March 2018 (Melbourne, Australia)
- Running time: 120 minutes
- Country: Australia
- Language: English

Full-length video of Dominion

Dominion is a 2018 Australian documentary film, filmed primarily with drones and hidden cameras inside Australian slaughterhouses and macro-farms, with the aim to expose the "opaque and inhumane system", according to its writer, director, and producer, Chris Delforce, an animal rights activist. The film documents multiple animal abuse industries in Australia, especially agricultural livestock, while focusing its message on animal rights. Dominion portrays the killing of animals through methods such as using carbon dioxide to gas pigs, maceration of chicks, and skinning foxes alive.

== Production ==
Dominion was managed by the animal protection and animal rights organisation, Farm Transparency Project, previously known as Aussie Farms. The film was funded through crowdfunding campaigns and the Australian animal rights organisation Voiceless. It features narration by the actors Joaquin Phoenix, Rooney Mara and Sadie Sink, as well as the singer Sia. It premiered in Melbourne on 29 March 2018. It was filmed to be a feature-length documentary sequel to Lucent (2014), which mostly focused on the Australian pig farming industry.

== Reception ==
Following its release, Dominion received the award for Best Documentary Feature at the 2018 Hollywood International Moving Pictures Film Festival, and Delforce won Best Director at the Festigious International Film Festival. Dominion has been used as a focal point for vegan protest groups, who encourage others to watch the documentary.

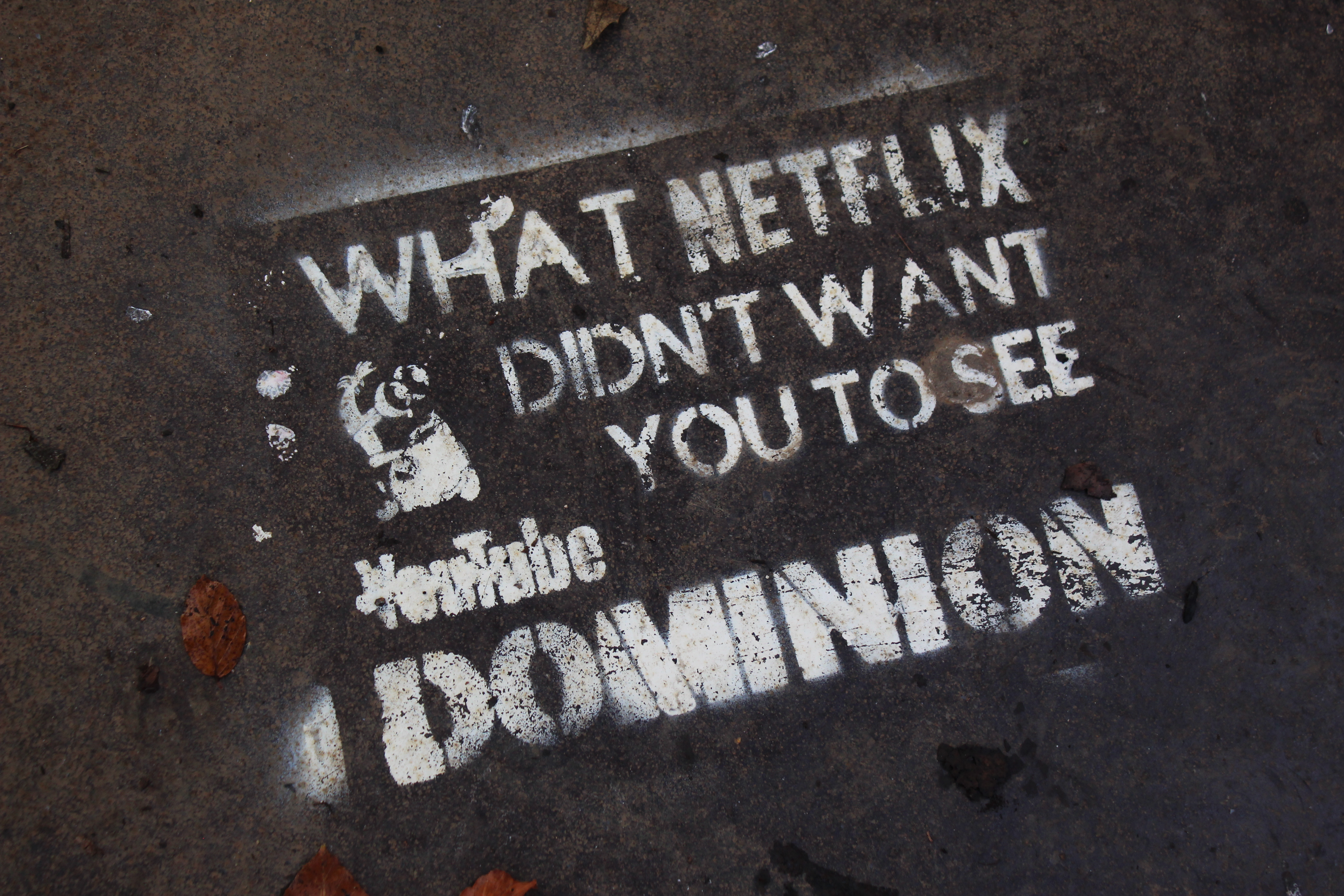
Guerrilla-style marketing for the film

== Criticism ==
Australian farmers have been critical of the film, seeing it as an "attack on Australian farming". The Australian Meat Industry Council Chief Executive, Patrick Hutchinson, has said, "What the film shows is not representative of the practices of the wider industry", while Fiona Simson, president of the National Farmers' Federation, recognised that there was "room for improvement" by industry with respect to animal welfare practices.

== See also ==
- List of vegan and plant-based media
