= Australasian Meat Industry Employees Union =

Australian trade union

AMIEU
- Australasian Meat Industry Employees Union
- Founded: 1906
- Headquarters: Brisbane, Queensland
- Location: Australia
- Members: ▼15,084 (as at 31 December 2024)
- Key people: Graham Smith, Federal Secretary; Patricia Fernandez, Federal President
- Affiliations: ACTU, IUF, ALP
- Website: amieu.asn.au

The Australasian Meat Industry Employees Union (also known as the Meatworkers Union) is an Australian trade union representing workers in the meat industry including in abattoirs, butchers, and smallgoods manufacturers.

== Structure ==
The AMIEU has branches representing workers each State and Territory of Australia. Branch officials are democratically elected by the members every four years.

The union also has a Federal Council, which represents the union nationally and is the supreme decision-making body of the union. The council is composed of elected delegates from each branch, who meet every two years to determine policy for the union and elect the Federal Secretary and President.

In between the biannual meetings of the council the union is governed by a Federal Executive made up of the secretaries of each branch as well as the Federal Secretary and President.

The union is affiliated with the IUF, the Australian Council of Trade Unions, and the Australian Labor Party.

== History ==
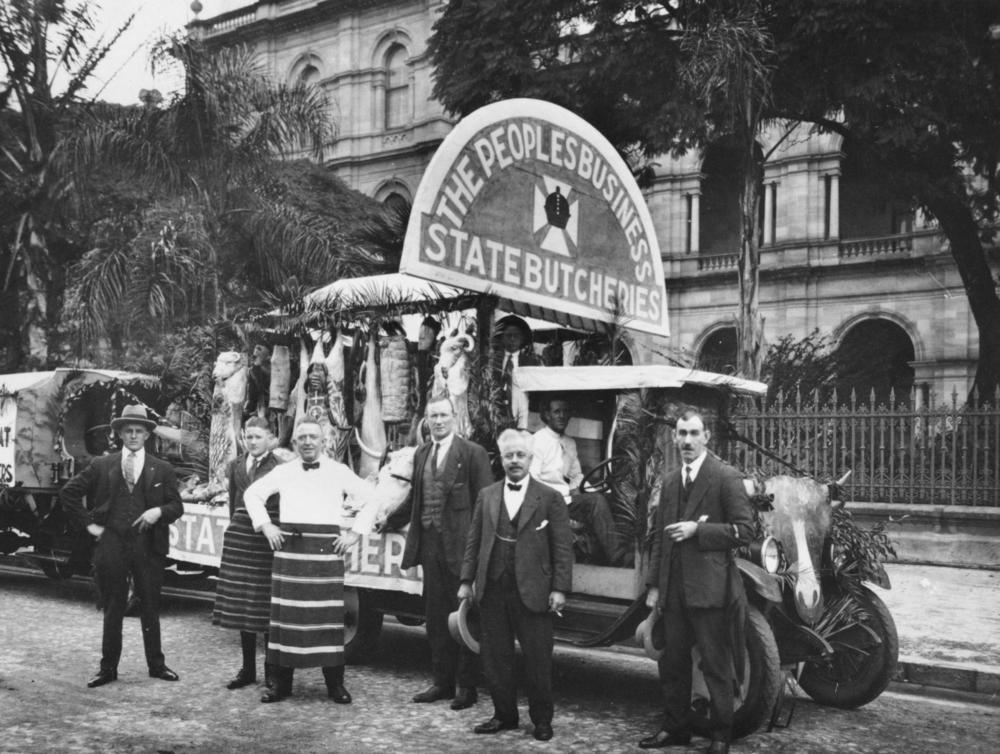
Butchers posing in front of their Labour Day float, Brisbane, 1920

=== Early history ===
Prior to 1890 there were no organised trade unions in the Australian meat processing industry. Wages and conditions varied from worksite to worksite and were re-negotiated at the start of each killing season by butchers on behalf of their teams. Wages tended to be higher at the start of the season when cattle were plentiful, but then driven down significantly at the end of the season when cattle were scarce.

The AMIEU was formed in 1906 as the Federated Butchers Union, and changed its name to the Australasian Meat Industry Employees Union in 1912.

The AMIEU was organised between 1906 and 1920, particularly in Queensland, by the revolutionary union the Industrial Workers of the World. The IWW, or Wobblies, encouraged Meatworkers to set up boards of control on job sites. These boards functioned, effectively, as works councils in the Meat industry. The boards were particularly strong in North Queensland where, under the direction of state organiser Walter Russell Crampton, they controlled production levels through direct action. Meat industry sheds in North Queensland were so effectively organised that the sheds became closed shops. This was known in the day as Preference of Employment.

The AMEIU used the skilled portion of the workforce, the slaughtering gang, to infiltrate non-union towns in North Queensland. These towns were essentially company towns. The slaughtering gang was irreplaceable due to their skill, they were mobile as their skill was in demand across multiple shops, and they were militant. The AMIEU considered itself an industrial union and enrolled all workers in a particular workplace regardless of their trade—the meatworkers represented boilermakers, engine drivers and maintenance workers who worked in the meat industry.

The Queensland organising techniques spread to southern states. Shop committees (workers councils) were established at the Melbourne and Corio works in Victoria in 1917, on the initiative of C. Coupe. Coupe believed shop committees would, "ultimately form part of the machinery of government for the workers when they are prepared to take control of the industries, to be run in the interests of the working class."

In South Australia councils were also established, and in 1919 the South Australian branch of the AMIEU reported to the federal council, "No dispute along the old lines of a cessation of work has taken place within the past two years. Job control and scientific organisation has rendered obsolete this medieval method of fighting. The arbitration method of securing our rights has often been discussed, and has been submitted to most adverse criticism; and, so far as this branch is concerned, unless the whole aim and present methods of the arbitration system are speedily altered, we will have none of it."

The Preference of employment was to be given to members of the Queensland branch of the Australasian Meat Industry Employees' Union.

The councils actively organised go-slows and sabotage, as replacements for strike action. Revolutionary unionism is unusual in Australian history, and the 1908–1923 period was particularly militant. In the same period the AMIEU was organising workers councils; the IWW was organising general strikes, forgery scandals and arson attacks in New South Wales to prevent continued Australian involvement in the First World War, and to protect workers rights. The IWW was a large force behind these upheavals in NSW, and when the IWW was persecuted nationally after 1916, the AMIEU supported them.

In 1947, George Seelaf was made Secretary of the AMIEU, a position he would hold for over two decades. Under Seelaf, the AMIEU became a renowned campaigning force. It agitated for both industrial goals, such as shorter hours and better wages, and non-industrial positions, such as opposing antisemitism and homophobia. He also worked to unite city-based unionists with family farmers, believing them to both be victims of large businesses.

=== Recent history ===
IN 1983, the AMIEU was involved in a major industrial dispute at the Mudginberri abattoir in the Northern Territory. The AMIEU served a log of claims on Mudginberri and on all other abattoirs in the Northern Territory, seeking a unit tally system to be set up. Mudginberri chose to fight the claim, with the backing of the National Farmers' Federation.

The AMIEU has supported a ban on live animal exports since the 2018 animal rights controversy in the Australian live exports industry, and has called for live exports to be replaced by an expanded chilled meat trade.

== See also ==
- Industrial Workers of the World philosophy and tactics
- Sydney Twelve
- Willy Pete § History
- Meat industry
