= Heather Mitchell (farmer) =

Australian farmer, conservationist (1917–1999)

Heather Mary Mitchell OBE AM, nee Hutchieson (25 September 1917 – 12 November 1999) was an Australian farmer, community leader and conservationist. From 1986 to 1989, she served as the first female president of the Victorian Farmers Federation, and played a central role in the establishment of Landcare.

Born in Sydney, she grew up in Albury and in the 1930s went to Melbourne to study nursing. She married Lester Clarence Mitchell, a pharmacist, in 1941 and moved to Hopetoun, where the couple ran a pharmacy and a number of farms. From 1956 to 1966, she served as regional president for the local Red Cross, and from 1966 to 1974 as regional commandant. She was also a life governor for the Royal Victorian Institute for the Blind (1960) and Corrong Retirement Village (1979). She served as president of the local high school council and on the board of Wimmera Base Hospital. From 1969 to 1974 she was the country's vice-president of the Liberal Party in Victoria. In 1979 she was appointed an Officer of the Order of the British Empire.

In the 1980s Mitchell and her husband moved to Horsham, where she became closely involved in the Victorian Farmers Federation (VFF). She was elected the organisation's first female president in 1986, and in that year she and Joan Kirner were the inaugural chairs of Landcare Victoria. She was also the inaugural president of the Public Land Council of Victoria in 1987, and in 1989, the year her term as VFF president ended, she was elected the first female vice-president of the National Farmers' Federation.

Lester died in 1989. Mitchell was appointed a Member of the Order of Australia in 1991 and in 1992 became a life member of the VFF. Her service to the Red Cross was recognised in 1995 with the International Order of St John, and in 1997 she became the patron of the Public Land Council. She died in Melbourne in 1999. She was inducted posthumously onto the Victorian Honour Roll of Women in 2001.
