= World Farmers' Organisation =

International organisation of farmers

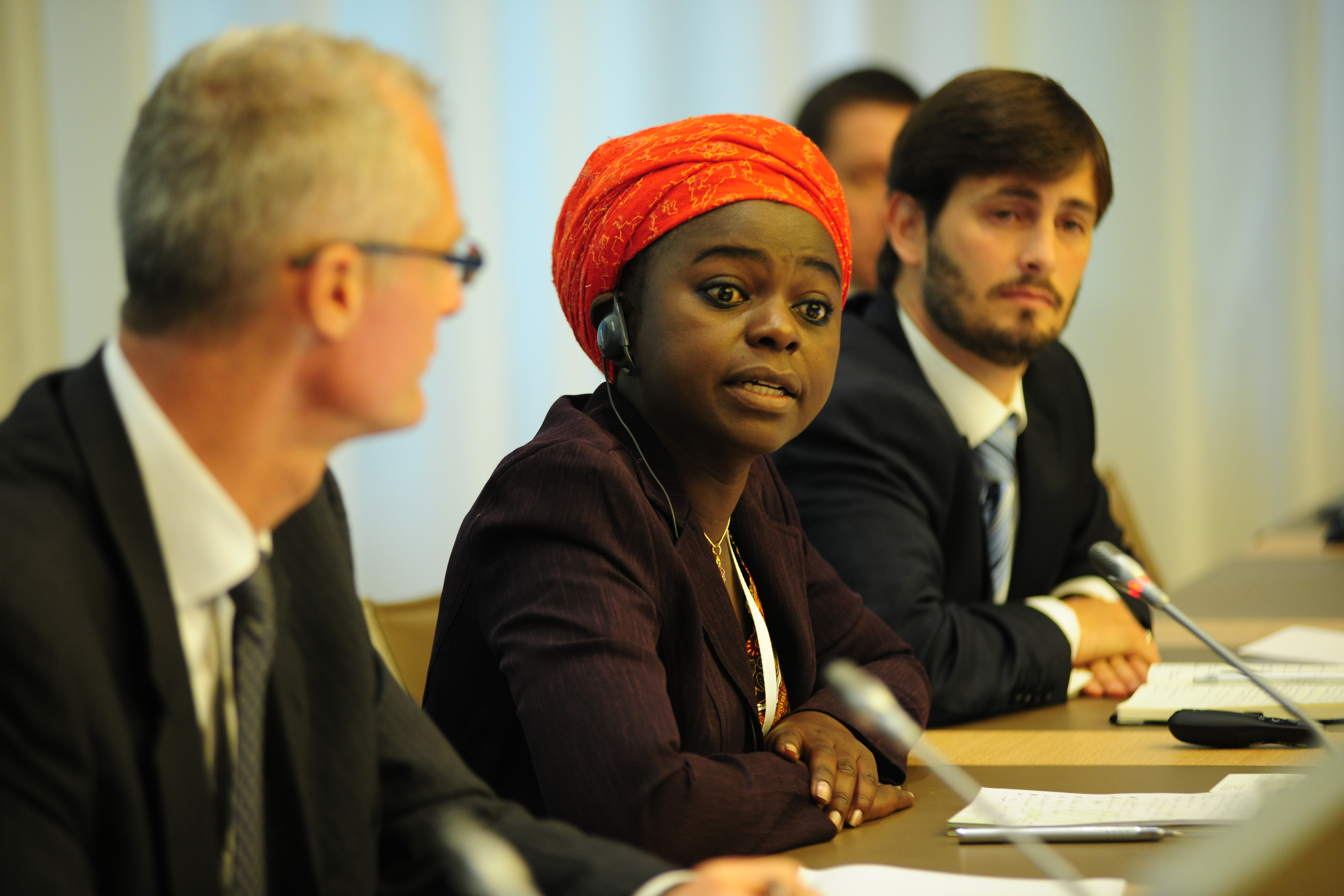
Evelyn Nguleka, president of the WFO and the Zambian National Farmers Union, at the World Trade Organization Public Forum in 2015

The World Farmers' Organization (WFO) is an international organisation of farmers with a focus on agroecology, farming typologies, food chains, indigenous peoples, and mountain farming.

== History ==
A former organisation, the International Federation of Agricultural Producers, was dissolved in 2010. It had been the subject of criticism for mostly middle to upper-class farmers from the Global North.

The World Farmers Organisation (WFO) was established in Rome, Italy, on 12 July 2011, with the aim of representing and advocating for farmers around the world, and bringing farmers and cooperatives together to develop policies and programs to provide solutions to global food security issues.

== Description ==
The WFO has its headquarters in Rome. It is an international organisation of farmers with a focus on agroecology, farming typologies, food chains, indigenous peoples, and mountain farming. It aims to strengthen agricultural producers and farmers' positions within value chains, with a particular focus on smallholder farmers. It closely cooperates with the Food and Agriculture Organization, which is also headquartered in Rome. It also aims to improve the livelihood of producers and rural communities in general.

Researcher Annette Schramm of the University of Tübingen in Germany in 2017 voiced criticism of the WFO for acting as a successor to the now-defunct IFAP, with its focus on representing middle-class to rich farmers from the Global North, and a threat to the Civil Society Mechanism, (now Civil Society and Indigenous Peoples' Mechanism (CSIPM)), an autonomous part of the United Nations Committee on World Food Security.

WFO cooperates with Bayer in several projects (WFO Gymnasium, "Cattle4Care").

== People ==
Robert Carlson of the United States was president of the WFO before the election of Peter Kendall of the United Kingdom in March 2014, but resigned in October 2014 owing to being appointed to a UK government post.

Evelyn Nguleka, who was the first woman president of Zambia Agricultural Organization and the Zambia National Farmers Union, was appointed as acting president in October 2014, and president in 2015. After her resignation on 22 September 2016, WFO vice-president William Rolleston, president of the Federated Farmers of New Zealand, stepped into the acting role.

On 13 June 2017, South African farmer Theo de Jager was elected president. He was the first South African to assume the role. He had led the Southern African Confederation of Agricultural Unions since 2013, and had also had a stint as president of the Pan-African Farmers' Organisation.

In June 2022 Arnold Puech d'Alissac, a family farmer from the Normandy region in northern France, was elected president, and remains in the position as of June 2024. From 2017 until 2022 he had represented the European constituency on the WFO board. His term ends in 2026.

In June 2024, Fiona Simson, who had been first female president of the National Farmers' Federation in Australia from 2016 until 2023 and was elected to the WFO board in 2023, was elected vice-president of the WFO. She is the first Australian vice-president.

== See also ==
- IFOAM
