= Richard Farley (disambiguation) =

Richard Farley (born 1948) is an American convicted murderer in the Sunnyvale ESL shooting.

Richard Farley may also refer to:

- Dick Farley (1946–2026), American football player and coach
- Dick Farley (basketball) (1932–1969), American basketball player
- Rick Farley (1952–2006), Australian politician and civil rights activist

== See also ==
- Richard Farleigh (born 1960), Australian private investor
