= Peter Kendall (farmer) =

English farmer and former NFU president

Peter Ashley Kendall

President of National Farmers' Union of England and Wales
- In office 2006–2014
- Preceded by: Tim Bennett
- Succeeded by: Meurig Raymond

Personal details
- Born: 8 May 1960 (age 65)

Sir Peter Ashley Kendall (born 8 May 1960) is an English farmer and former National Farmers' Union (NFU) officeholder from East Bedfordshire.

In 2006, Kendall was elected President of the National Farmers' Union. He held the position until 2014 when he was succeeded by Meurig Raymond. He was elected president of the World Farmers' Organisation in March 2014, but resigned in October of that year after being appointed chair of the Agriculture and Horticulture Development Board in the UK.

He was knighted in the 2015 New Year Honours.
