= Rick Farley =

Australian activist

- Born: Richard Andrew Farley; 9 December 1952; Townsville, Queensland, Australia
- Died: 13 May 2006 (aged 53); Sydney, Australia
- Occupations: Politician, Civil rights activist
- Political party: Australian Democrats
- Movement: Aboriginal reconciliation, Indigenous rights

Richard Andrew Farley (9 December 1952 – 13 May 2006) was an Australian journalist, politician and Indigenous Australian rights activist. He was a prominent member of the Council for Aboriginal Reconciliation.

== Career ==
Farley worked as a journalist for the Rockhampton Morning Bulletin before he became an adviser to the federal Minister for Health in the Whitlam government. He became the executive director of the Cattlemen's Union of Australia and was the chief executive of the National Farmers' Federation for eight years. In 1989, while head of the National Farmers' Federation, Farley and Phillip Toyne of the Australian Conservation Foundation obtained financial contribution from the Australian government towards Landcare. Subsequently, Farley committed his life and his career to the needs of farmers, conservationists and Indigenous reconciliation.

In 1998, Farley was unsuccessful as an Australian Democrats party candidate for the Australian Senate to represent the Australian Capital Territory.

Farley was described as having had "an extraordinary ability to persuade, negotiate and build bridges to gain bipartisan support for the matters he was passionate about".

== Personal life ==
Farley was born in Townsville, Queensland, on 9 December 1952. In 1983, he married Cathy Reade. They had a son, Jeremy and a daughter Cailin. They separated in 1996. Farley went on to date Australian Labor Party MP Linda Burney, then member of the New South Wales Legislative Assembly.

== Death ==
On 13 May 2006, at the age of 53, Farley died after his wheelchair overturned outside Balmain Hospital in Sydney. He had been leaving after undergoing rehabilitation treatment for a brain aneurysm which he had suffered five months earlier. His funeral was held at St Brigid's Church, in Marrickville. The service was attended not only by numerous prominent politicians and celebrities, but also by Indigenous Australians and rural cattlemen and farmers whom he had represented during his career. He was survived by his partner Linda Burney and two children, and by his first wife Cathy Reade and their children Jeremy and Cailin.

== Legacy ==
Farley contributed notably towards the creation of Landcare, an environmental organisation with thousands of volunteers across Australia.

In December 2006, Linda Burney nominated Bush Heritage Australia to establish the Rick Farley Memorial Scholarship to encourage young Indigenous Australians to pursue environmental conservation and cultural management and to honour Farley's career and achievements.

A biography, A Way Through: The Life of Rick Farley, by Nicholas Brown and Susan Boden, was published by NewSouth in 2012.
