= We Meaning You Tour =

2010–11 concert tour by Sia

- Tour by Sia
- Associated album: We Are Born
- Start date: 10 April 2010
- End date: 8 February 2011
- Legs: 3
- No. of shows: 20 in North America; 6 in Europe; 10 in Australasia; 36 total

Sia concert chronology
- We Meaning You Tour (2010–11); We Are Born Tour (2011)

The We Meaning You Tour was the first concert tour by Australian singer Sia. The tour was launched in support of her fifth studio album, We Are Born (2010). The tour performed shows in North America, Europe and Australasia. The concert at the Roundhouse was recorded and release through Concert Live.

== Background ==
The first show in Vancouver was cut short when the singer suffered from heat exhaustion, and left the stage after an aborted rendition of "Be Good to Me".

== Critical reception ==
The setlist featured a selection of new songs from the album set for a June release, such as "Clap Your Hands" and older tracks. It also included the covers "Oh Father" and "I Go to Sleep". The performance of "I Go To Sleep" during the Portland show was described as "swirling, and gently smoldering, something that allowed Sia to let her voice to shine in all its glory".

A review of the opening night of the European tour remarked that the "actual musical performance [was] decidedly fantastic" while noting the song "Breathe Me" which had been used in prolific advert for the company Nykredit. A reviewer of the well-attended concert in Brussels found a well-balanced setlist and praised the vocal gymnastics, while technical issues resulted in a muted performance in Utrecht.

== Personnel ==
Band

- Guitar: Tim Vanderkuil
- Bass: Sam Dixon
- Keyboards: Joe Kennedy
- Drums: Felix Bloxsom

== Opening acts ==
- Body Language (North America, select dates)
- Girl in a Coma (North America, select dates)
- Dance Yourself to Death (North America, select dates)
- RebekkaMaria (Copenhagen)

== Setlist ==
The following setlist was obtained from the concert held on 15 May 2010, at L'Aéronef in Lille, France. It does not represent all concerts for the duration of the tour.

1. "The Fight"
2. "Buttons"
3. "Big Girl Little Girl"
4. "Little Black Sandals"
5. "Oh Father"
6. "You've Changed"
7. "Lentil"
8. "Never Gonna Leave Me"
9. "The Girl You Lost to Cocaine"
10. "I Go to Sleep"
11. "Cloud"
12. "Clap Your Hands"
13. "You Have Been Loved"
14. "Breathe Me"

Encore

15. "Sunday"
16. "Soon We'll Be Found"

== Tour dates ==
Date	City	Country	Venue
North America
10 April 2010	Vancouver	Canada	Commodore Ballroom
12 April 2010	Seattle	United States	Showbox at the Market
13 April 2010	Portland	United States	Wonder Ballroom
14 April 2010	San Francisco	United States	Regency Ballroom
17 April 2010^{[A]}	Indio	United States	Empire Polo Club
19 April 2010	San Diego	United States	House of Blues
20 April 2010	Tempe	United States	Marquee Theatre
22 April 2010	Englewood	United States	Gothic Theatre
24 April 2010	Minneapolis	United States	Fine Line Music Cafe
25 April 2010	Chicago	United States	The Vic Theatre
26 April 2010	Detroit	United States	Saint Andrew's Hall
28 April 2010	Toronto	Canada	Phoenix Concert Theatre
30 April 2010	Montreal	Canada	Club Soda
1 May 2010	Boston	United States	House of Blues
2 May 2010	Philadelphia	United States	Theatre of Living Arts
4 May 2010	Washington, D.C.	United States	9:30 Club
5 May 2010	Northampton	United States	Pearl Street Ballroom
6 May 2010	New York City	United States	Terminal 5
7 May 2010	Richmond	United States	National Theater
8 May 2010	Baltimore	United States	Rams Head Live!
Europe
12 May 2010	Copenhagen	Denmark	Vega
15 May 2010	Lille	France	L'Aéronef
16 May 2010	Brussels	Belgium	Ancienne Belgique
17 May 2010	Utrecht	Netherlands	Vredenburg Leidsche Rijn
18 May 2010	Paris	France	L'Olympia
27 May 2010	London	England	Roundhouse
Australasia
21 January 2011^{[B]}	Auckland	New Zealand	Mount Smart Stadium
23 January 2011^{[B]}	Gold Coast	Australia	Gold Coast Parklands
26 January 2011^{[B]}	Sydney	Australia	Sydney Showground Stadium
27 January 2011^{[B]}	Sydney	Australia	Sydney Showground Stadium
30 January 2011^{[B]}	Melbourne	Australia	Flemington Racecourse
1 February 2011	Melbourne	Australia	Palais Theatre
2 February 2011	Sydney	Australia	Enmore Theatre
4 February 2011^{[B]}	Adelaide	Australia	Adelaide Showground
6 February 2011^{[B]}	Perth	Australia	Claremont Showground
8 February 2011	Adelaide	Australia	Thebarton Theatre

Festivals and other miscellaneous performances
^{A} This concert was a part of the "Coachella Valley Music and Arts Festival"
^{B} This concert was a part of "Big Day Out"

Cancellations and rescheduled shows

5 May 2010	Baltimore, Maryland	Rams Head Live!	Rescheduled to 8 May 2010
12 May 2010	Copenhagen, Denmark	Falkoner Teatret	Moved to Vega
20 May 2010	Berlin, Germany	Astra Kulturhaus	Rescheduled to 11 October 2010
21 May 2010	Hamburg, Germany	Große Freiheit 36	Rescheduled to 10 October 2010
23 May 2010	Munich, Germany	Muffathalle	Rescheduled to 12 October 2010
24 May 2010	Stuttgart, Germany	Theaterhaus	Rescheduled to 13 October 2010
25 May 2010	Cologne, Germany	Gloria-Theater	Rescheduled to 14 October 2010 and moved to Essigfabrik
6 October 2010	London, England	Troxy	Cancelled
10 October 2010	Hamburg, Germany	Große Freiheit 36	Cancelled
11 October 2010	Berlin, Germany	Astra Kulturhaus	Cancelled
12 October 2010	Munich, Germany	Muffathalle	Cancelled
13 October 2010	Stuttgart, Germany	Theaterhaus	Cancelled
14 October 2010	Cologne, Germany	Essigfabrik	Cancelled

=== Box office score data ===
Venue	City	Tickets sold / available	Gross revenue
House of Blues	San Diego	1,050 / 1,050 (100%)	$23,826
Gothic Theatre	Englewood	883 / 1,000 (88%)	$17,404
The Vic Theatre	Chicago	1,376 / 1,376 (100%)	$29,584
Club Soda	Montreal	902 / 902 (100%)	$21,071
Saint Andrew's Hall	Detroit	587 / 818 (72%)	$9,860
Theatre of Living Arts	Philadelphia	626 / 1,000 (63%)	$11,786
9:30 Club	Washington, D.C.	1,200 / 1,200 (100%)	$30,000
TOTAL		6,624 / 7,346 (90%)	$143,531
