= Sia =

Australian singer and songwriter (born 1975)

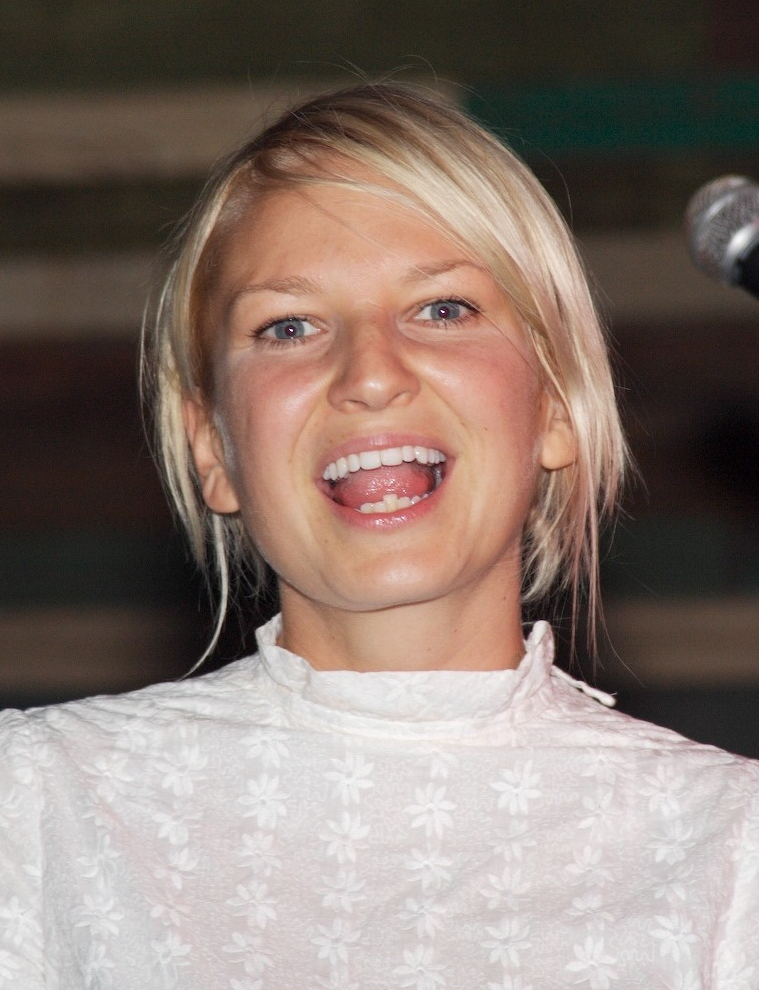
- Sia in 2006
- Born: Sia Kate Isobelle Furler; 18 December 1975 (age 50); Adelaide, South Australia
- Occupations: Singer; songwriter; director
- Spouses: Erik Anders Lang (m. 2014; div. 2016) Dan Bernad (m. 2022; div. 2026)
- Children: 3
- Relatives: Peter Furler (cousin)
- Awards: Full list
- Musical career
- Genres: Pop; folk; electronica
- Works: Discography; songs
- Labels: Flavoured; DancePool; Long Lost Brother; Astralwerks; Go! Beat; Monkey Puzzle; Hear; Jive; Inertia; RCA; Atlantic
- Website: siamusic.net

Signature
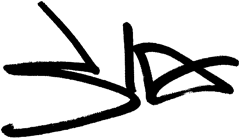

Sia Kate Isobelle Furler (/ˈsiːə/ SEE-ə; born 18 December 1975) is an Australian singer and songwriter. Born and raised in Adelaide, she started her career as a singer in the acid jazz band Crisp in the mid-1990s. When Crisp disbanded in 1997, she released her debut studio album, OnlySee, in Australia. Sia moved to London and provided vocals for the English duo Zero 7. She released her second studio album, Healing Is Difficult, in 2001 and her third, Colour the Small One, in 2004.

Sia moved to New York City in 2005 and toured the US. Her fourth and fifth studio albums, Some People Have Real Problems and We Are Born, were released in 2008 and 2010 respectively, and both were certified gold by the Australian Recording Industry Association and attracted wider notice than her earlier albums. Uncomfortable with her growing fame, she took a hiatus from performing and focused on songwriting for other artists, producing successful collaborations "Titanium" (with David Guetta), "Diamonds" (for Rihanna), "Wild Ones" (with Flo Rida) and "Pretty Hurts" (for Beyoncé).

Sia's sixth studio album, 1000 Forms of Fear, debuted atop the US Billboard 200, generating the top-ten single "Chandelier" and a trilogy of music videos she co-directed, starring child dancer Maddie Ziegler. Her seventh album, This Is Acting (2016), spawned the Billboard Hot 100 number-one single, "Cheap Thrills". In 2016, she also began her Nostalgic for the Present Tour, which incorporated dancing by Ziegler and others, and other performance art elements. After releasing the Christmas album Everyday Is Christmas (2017), Sia, Diplo and Labrinth released a collaborative studio album, LSD (2019). Her tenth album, Reasonable Woman, was released in 2024.

Sia is an advocate for animal rights. She has written many songs for films. Alongside her feature film directorial debut, Music (2021), which received a negative reception, she wrote and produced an album Music – Songs from and Inspired by the Motion Picture. Since the release of 1000 Forms of Fear, in public she has usually worn a wig that obscures her face to protect her privacy. Among her accolades are ten ARIA Awards, an MTV Video Music Award, and nine Grammy Award nominations.

== Early life and education ==
Sia Kate Isobelle Furler was born on 18 December 1975 in Adelaide, South Australia. Her father, Phil Colson, is a guitarist, and her mother, Loene Furler, is an art lecturer. She is the niece of actor Kevin Colson. At age 12, Sia stayed with family friend Colin Hay in New York City for a month, during which Hay attended the Grammy Awards. She cites watching the ceremony from his limousine as inspiration to pursue a music career. As a child, Sia imitated the performing style of Aretha Franklin, Stevie Wonder and Sting, and has cited them, in addition to Hay, as early influences. She attended Adelaide High School.

== Career ==
In the early 1990s, Sia started a career as a singer in the Adelaide acid jazz band Crisp. She contributed vocals to their album Word and the Deal (1996) and EP Delirium (1997). In 1997 Crisp disbanded, and Sia released her debut studio album, OnlySee, on Flavoured Records, in Australia, on 23 December. The album sold about 1,200 copies. Unlike her later albums, OnlySee was marketed under her full name, "Sia Furler". It was produced, and the songs were mostly written, by Jesse Flavell, with Sia co-writing or writing six tracks.

=== 1997–2006: Zero 7, Healing Is Difficult and Colour the Small One ===
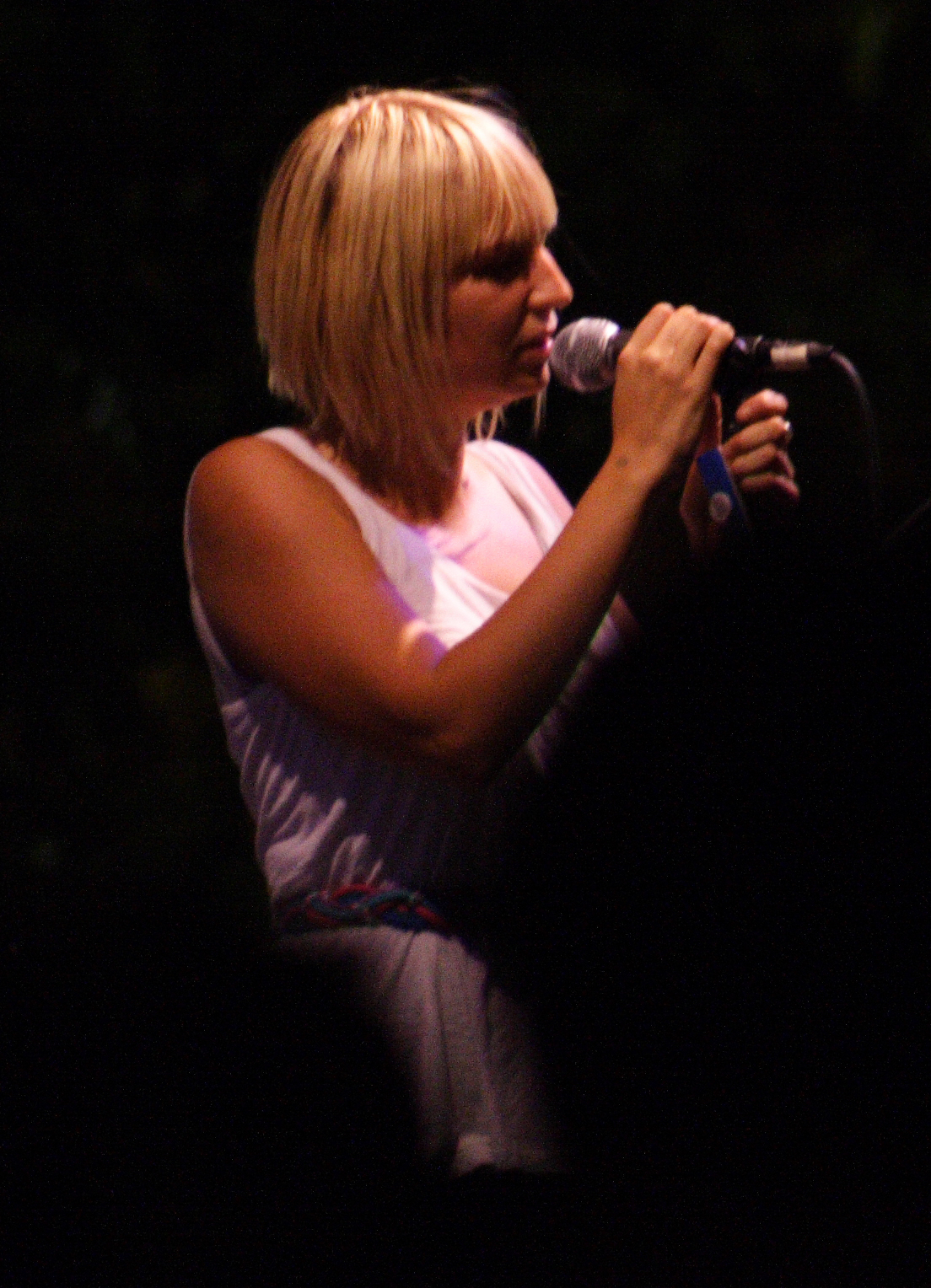
Sia in concert in 2006

Sia then moved to London, where she performed as a background vocalist for British band Jamiroquai. She also provided vocals for English downtempo group Zero 7 on their first three studio albums and toured with the group. On Zero 7's 2001 album Simple Things, Sia contributed vocals to two tracks including the single "Destiny", which peaked at No. 30 on the UK Singles Chart. In 2004, she provided vocals for Zero 7 on "Somersault" and "Speed Dial No. 2" (from the album When It Falls). In 2006, Sia collaborated with Zero 7 for their third album, The Garden.

In 2000, Sia signed a recording contract with Sony Music's sub-label DancePool and released a single, "Taken for Granted", which peaked at No. 10 on the UK Singles Chart. In 2001, she released her second solo album, Healing Is Difficult, which blends retro jazz and soul music and lyrically discusses Sia's dealing with the death of her first love affair. Displeased with the promotion of the album, Sia fired her manager, left Sony Music and signed with Go! Beat, a subsidiary of Universal Music Group (UMG). At the APRA Awards of 2002, Sia won the Breakthrough Songwriter category alongside Brisbane pop duo Aneiki's Jennifer Waite and Grant Wallis.

In 2004, Sia released her third studio album, Colour the Small One. The album employs a mixture of acoustic instruments and electronic backing to her material. The album spawned four singles, including "Don't Bring Me Down" and "Breathe Me", the latter of which charted in the United Kingdom, Denmark and France.

Dissatisfied with Colour the Small One's poor marketing and the album's struggle to connect with a mainstream audience, Sia relocated to New York City in 2005. During that time, "Breathe Me" appeared in the final scene of the US HBO television series Six Feet Under, which helped increase Sia's fame in the United States. Consequently, Sia's manager, David Enthoven, set up a tour across the country to maintain her career.

=== 2007–2010: Some People Have Real Problems and We Are Born ===
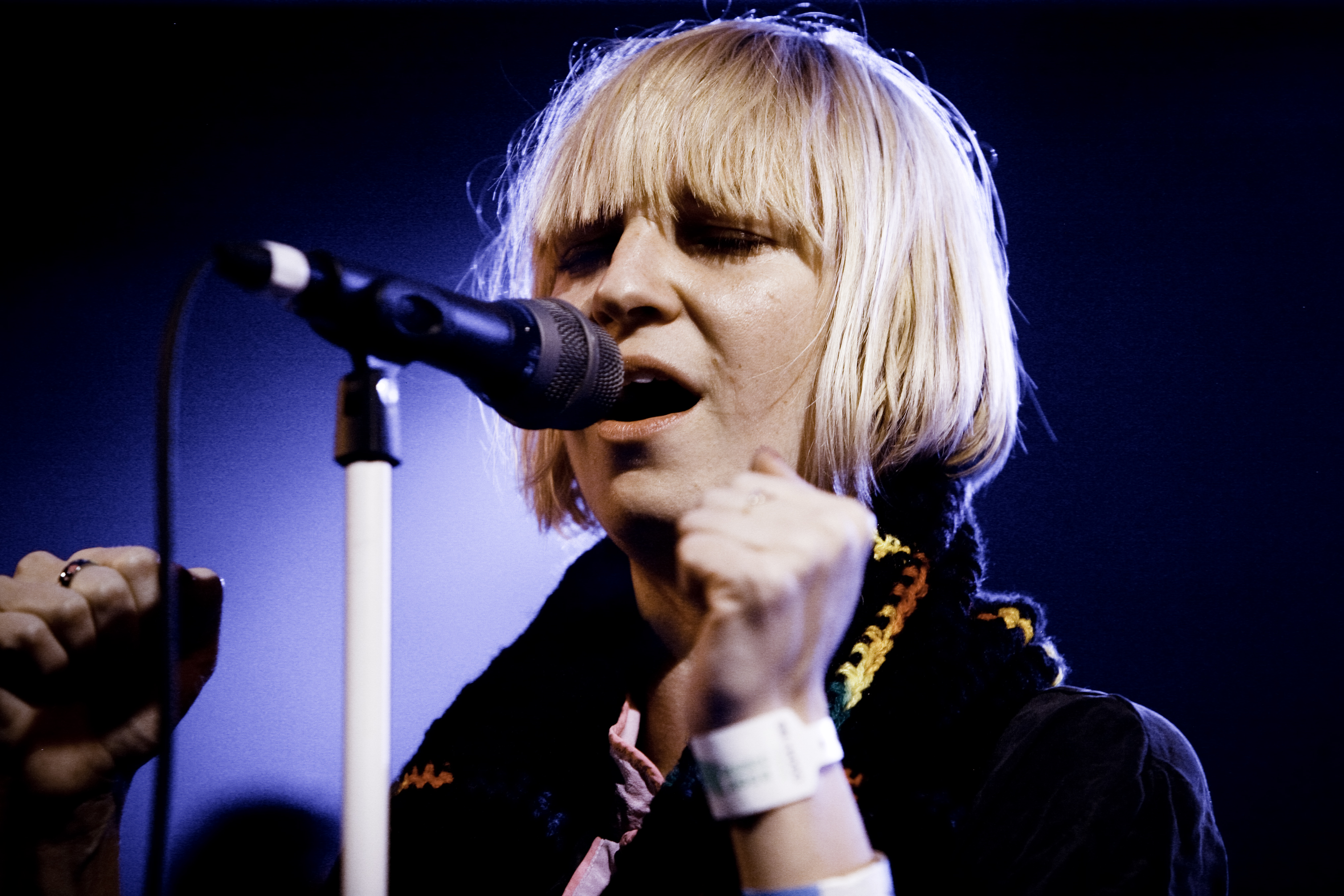
Sia performing at South by Southwest in 2008

In 2007, Sia released a live album, Lady Croissant, which included eight live songs from her April 2006 performance at the Bowery Ballroom in New York and one new studio recording—"Pictures". A year later, she left Zero 7 on friendly terms, replaced by Eska Mtungwazi as the band's frontwoman. Sia released her fourth studio album, Some People Have Real Problems on 8 January 2008. The album peaked at No. 41 in Australia and was certified gold by the Australian Recording Industry Association. It charted at No. 26 on the US Billboard 200, becoming Sia's first to chart in the United States. Some People Have Real Problems yielded four singles, including "The Girl You Lost to Cocaine". It peaked at No. 11 in the Netherlands and No. 12 in Spain; it additionally reached No. 8 on the US Hot Dance Club Songs. Another single from the album was "Soon We'll Be Found".

In May 2009, Sia released TV Is My Parent on DVD, which includes a live concert at New York's Hiro Ballroom, four music videos and behind-the-scene footage. At the ARIA Music Awards of 2009, Sia won the Best Music DVD category for TV Is My Parent. She also received a nomination for Best Breakthrough Artist Album for Some People Have Real Problems.

In 2009, American singer Christina Aguilera approached Sia about writing ballads for Aguilera's sixth studio album. The final product, Bionic, includes four songs co-written by Sia. Later in 2010, Sia also co-wrote "Bound to You" for the soundtrack of the film Burlesque, which starred Aguilera and Cher. The song was nominated for Best Original Song at the 68th Golden Globe Awards. In May 2011, Sia appeared on the inaugural season of the US version of The Voice as an adviser for Aguilera, who served as a vocal coach and judge.

In June 2010, Sia released her fifth studio album, We Are Born. The release peaked at No. 2 on the ARIA Albums Chart and was certified gold by the Australian Recording Industry Association. The release of the album was preceded by three singles: the lead single, "You've Changed", was released in December 2009 and charted at No. 31 in Australia. The follow-up single, "Clap Your Hands", peaked at No. 17 in Australia, No. 10 in the Netherlands and No. 27 in Switzerland. At the ARIA Music Awards of 2010, We Are Born earned Sia two categories won: Best Independent Release and Best Pop Release. Meanwhile, at the 2011 APRA Music Awards, Sia received a nomination for Song of the Year for "Clap Your Hands". To promote We Are Born, Sia gave the We Meaning You Tour, which visited North America and Europe in April–May 2010. The We Are Born Tour followed with stops in Australia in February 2011 and North America in July–August 2011.

=== 2010–2013: Songwriting career and mainstream recognition ===
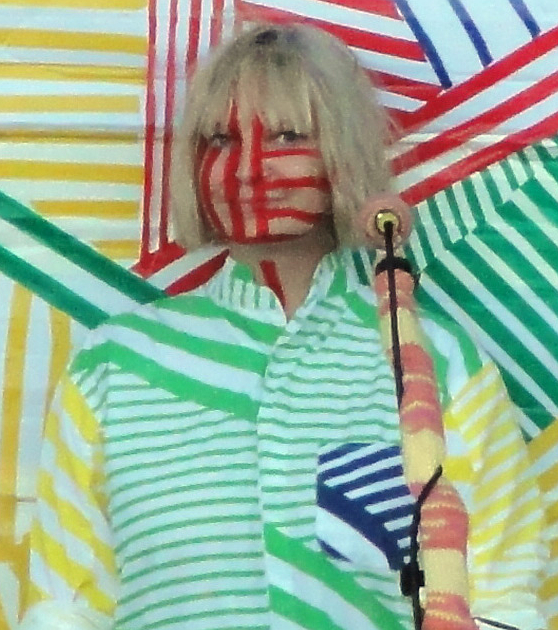
Sia performing in 2011

Following the success of We Are Born, Sia became uncomfortable with her growing fame. She later told The New York Times: "I just wanted to have a private life. Once, as my friend was telling me they had cancer, someone came up and asked, in the middle of the conversation, if they could take a photograph with me. You get me? That's enough, right?" She refused to do promos for her tours, began to wear a mask on stage and became increasingly dependent on drugs and alcohol on the road; she considered suicide. Sia fired Enthoven and hired Jonathan Daniel, who suggested that she write songs for other artists.

Sia retired as a recording artist and began a career as a songwriter. She wrote the song "Titanium" for American singer Alicia Keys, but it was later sent to David Guetta, who included Sia's original demo vocals on the song and released it as a single in 2011. "Titanium" peaked within the top ten of record charts in the United States, Australia and numerous European regions. However, Sia recalled: "I never even knew it was gonna happen, and I was really upset. Because I had just retired, I was trying to be a pop songwriter, not an artist."

From 2011 to 2013, Sia also co-wrote songs for many recording artists, including Beyoncé, Kylie Minogue, Flo Rida and Rihanna. Her collaboration with Flo Rida, "Wild Ones", peaked at No. 5 on the Billboard Hot 100 and was the tenth best-selling song of 2012 globally. In March 2012, Sia released a greatest hits album, Best Of..., in Australia.

=== 2013–2014: Breakthrough with 1000 Forms of Fear ===
In October 2013, Sia released "Elastic Heart" featuring the Weeknd and Diplo for the soundtrack of the American film The Hunger Games: Catching Fire (2013). She executive-produced Brooke Candy's debut EP, Opulence, released in May 2014, and co-wrote 3 songs on the EP. In July 2014, Sia released her own sixth studio album, 1000 Forms of Fear. She again collaborated with Greg Kurstin. The album debuted at No. 1 in the US Billboard 200 with first-week sales of 52,000 copies. By October 2015, it was certified gold by the RIAA denoting 500,000 equivalent-album units sold in the United States. The record peaked at No. 1 in Australia and reached the top ten of charts in numerous European regions. It was certified silver by the British Phonographic Industry and gold by the Australian Recording Industry Association. By early 2016, the album had sold 1 million copies worldwide.

1000 Forms of Fear's lead single, "Chandelier" was released in March 2014. The song peaked at No. 8 on the US Billboard Hot 100, becoming Sia's first entry on that chart as a lead artist. Elsewhere, the song experienced similar commercial success, ranking in the top ten of the record charts in Australia and numerous European regions. As of January 2015, the single had sold 2 million copies in the United States. At the 57th Annual Grammy Awards (2015), Sia received four nominations for "Chandelier": Record of the Year, Song of the Year, Best Pop Solo Performance and Best Music Video.

For performances of songs from 1000 Forms of Fear, Sia chose not to show her face, either facing away from audiences or hiding it behind oversized platinum blonde wigs. In videos for the singles "Chandelier", "Elastic Heart" and "Big Girls Cry", choreographed by Ryan Heffington and co-directed by Sia and Daniel Askill, and in many of the promotional live performances, child dancer Maddie Ziegler performed as a proxy for Sia in bobbed blonde wigs similar to Sia's familiar hairstyle. The three videos have received a total of more than 4 billion views on Vevo. In an interview with Kristen Wiig in Interview magazine, she said she decided to conceal her face to avoid a celebrity lifestyle and maintain some privacy: "I'm trying to have some control over my image. And I'm allowed to maintain some modicum of privacy. But also I would like not to be picked apart or for people to observe when I put on ten pounds or take off ten pounds or I have a hair extension out of place or my fake tan is botched. Most people don't have to be under that pressure, and I'd like to be one of them." The video for Elastic Heart "courted controversy and plaudits in equal measure". Sia explained that the two dancers represented "warring 'Sia' self states", but she nevertheless apologised on Twitter to anyone who was "triggered". Gia Kourlas wrote in The New York Times in 2016 that Sia's collaborations with Heffington have "done more to raise the standards of dance in pop music than nearly any current artist integrating the forms". The "Chandelier" video was ranked as the 10th "greatest music video" of the 2010s by Billboard.

In 2014, Sia contributed to the soundtrack to the 2014 film adaptation of the Broadway musical Annie. She and producer Greg Kurstin wrote three new songs for the film as well as re-working songs from the musical. Sia, Kurstin and the film's director Will Gluck were nominated for Best Original Song at the 72nd Golden Globe Awards for "Opportunity".

=== 2015–2019: This Is Acting and Everyday is Christmas ===
In an interview with NME in February 2015, Sia revealed that she had completed the follow-up to 1000 Forms of Fear, titled This Is Acting. The album was another collaboration with producer and co-writer Greg Kurstin. She said she released 1000 Forms of Fear to free herself from her record deal and had planned simply to write for other artists, but the album's success spurred her to continue writing her own music. Also in February 2015, alongside the digital deluxe release of 1000 Forms of Fear, she released a mobile game, Bob Job. "Alive" from This Is Acting was co-written by Adele and had originally been intended for her third album, 25.

In November, Sia collaborated with composer J. Ralph on the soundtrack of the environmental documentary Racing Extinction, co-writing and singing the song "One Candle". She released two more songs from the album, "Bird Set Free" and "One Million Bullets". The single "Cheap Thrills", featuring Sean Paul, reached No. 1 on the US Billboard Hot 100. Sia released two videos for the song. One features Ziegler and two male dancers, while the other, featuring Sean Paul, shows a 1950s style teen dance party; it has accumulated more than 1.7 billion views.

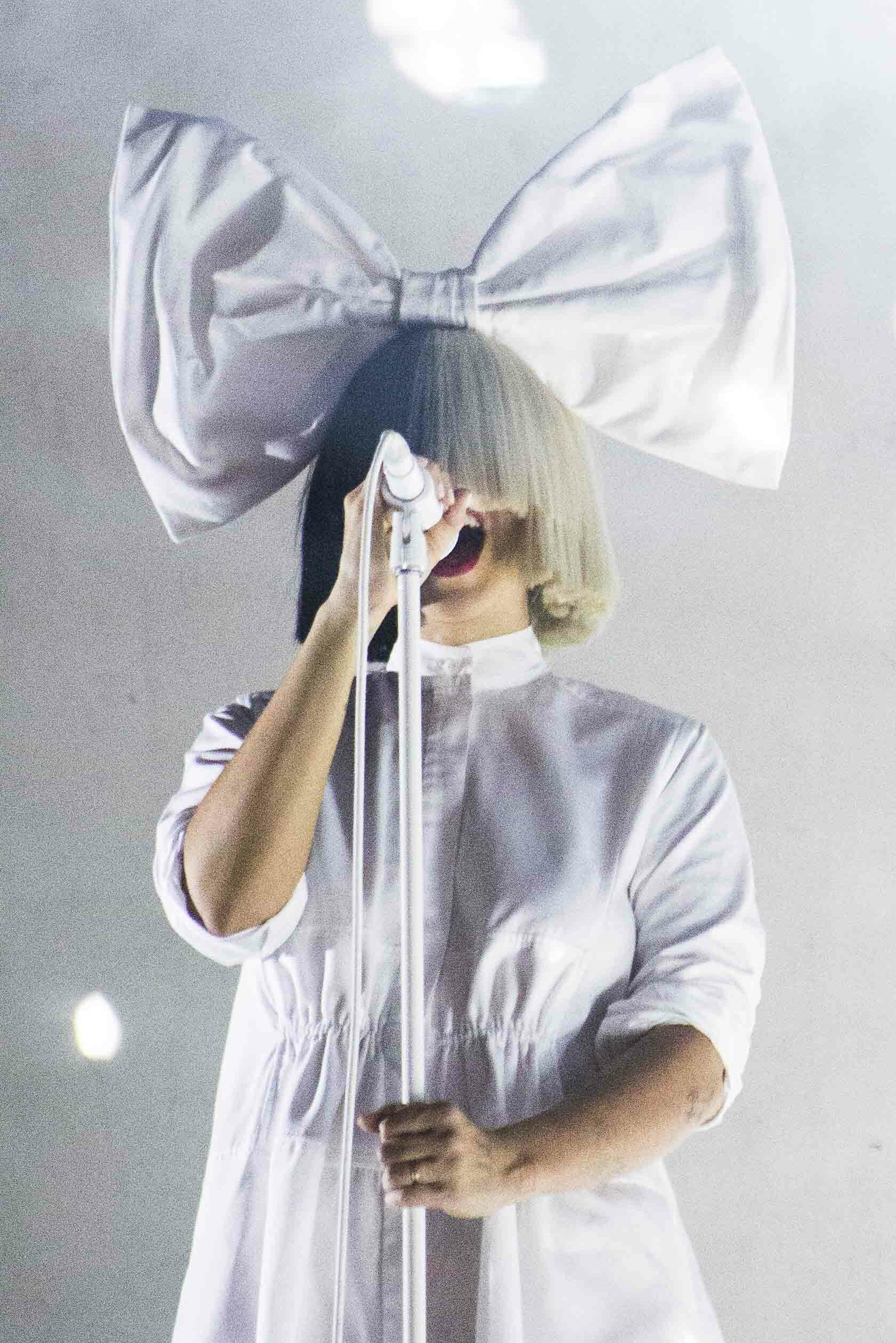
Sia performing in 2016

In April 2016, Sia's performance at the Coachella Valley Music and Arts Festival went viral online. Her performance received an effusively positive critical reception as "one of the greatest moments in Coachella's 17-year history", and it was consistently called one of the best performances of the 2016 festival. The performance was her first full concert since 2011. Sia is an avid fan of the television reality series Survivor; in 2016, she made a surprise appearance on the live reunion of Survivor: Kaôh Rōng, where she donated $50,000 to contestant Tai Trang and another $50,000 to an animal charity of his choice, noting that the two share a mutual love of animals. After that she regularly awarded prizes to her favourite Survivor contestants.

In June 2016, Sia gave a concert at Red Rocks Amphitheatre in Colorado, featuring Ziegler. From May to August, Sia performed in nearly a dozen festivals and other concerts in America and European and Middle Eastern countries, including Portugal, Denmark, Sweden, Finland, Hungary, Romania, Poland, the United Kingdom, Russia, Lebanon and Israel. In September 2016, she released a single, "The Greatest", with vocals from American hip hop recording artist Kendrick Lamar. A video was released the same day featuring Ziegler – the dancer's fifth video collaboration with Sia and Heffington. The two performed the song with several other dancers, and also performed "Chandelier" live the next day at the Apple annual fall event, drawing media attention. Her YouTube videos have accumulated a total of more than 12 billion views, and the channel has more than 24 million subscribers.

Sia gave her Nostalgic for the Present Tour in North America from September to November 2016, featuring Ziegler. As at Coachella and subsequent live performances, Sia appeared at the back of the stage with her familiar wig covering her face, while her dancers performed Heffington's choreography synchronised with pre-recorded videos played on big screens. The tour received a warm reaction: "She let her dancers own center stage, carrying out one skit/performance after another as Sia [sang]. It defied all the regular rules of pop concerts, which are usually designed to focus ... on the star of the show. Yet, Sia's bold gamble paid off, resulting in one of the most daringly original and wholly satisfying shows of 2016." Ed Masley of The Arizona Republic described the show as "part performance art, part interpretive dance. ... [Sia] sounded amazing. ... There's so much raw emotion in her songs. And you can definitely hear that in her voice, but it becomes more visceral when you can also read it in the faces of her dancers, especially Ziegler. ... The entire performance was brilliantly staged". Sia was nominated for three 2017 Grammy Awards. She co-wrote and performed on a platinum-selling single, "Dusk Till Dawn", by Zayn. Sia performed in concert at the close of the Dubai World Cup in March 2017, together with her dancers, led by Ziegler. The second leg of the Nostalgic for the Present Tour was her first stadium tour in Australasia, in late 2017.

In 2017, Sia moved from RCA to Atlantic Records. She released the album Everyday Is Christmas on Atlantic and Monkey Puzzle in November 2017. The album features original songs co-written and co-produced with Kurstin. She performed the single "Snowman" on the finale of the 13th season of The Voice and on The Ellen DeGeneres Show with Ziegler dancing. "Snowman" has also since become a modern-day Christmas classic, and is one of the most-streamed Christmas songs of all time.

In 2018, Sia collaborated with English musician Labrinth and American DJ/record producer Diplo to form the supergroup LSD. They released five singles: "Genius", "Audio", "Thunderclouds", "Mountains", and "No New Friends", before releasing an album, Labrinth, Sia & Diplo Present... LSD, in April 2019. Also in 2018, Sia was one of the narrators of Australian animal rights documentary, Dominion, and shared in a 2018 Award of Excellence from the Hollywood International Independent Documentary Awards.

=== 2020–present: Music and Reasonable Woman ===
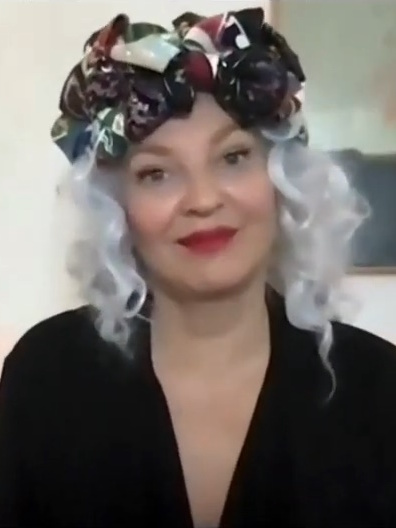
Sia in 2021

Her ninth album, Music – Songs from and Inspired by the Motion Picture, was released in February 2021 in connection with the release of her film, Music. The album peaked at number 8 on the US Billboard soundtrack album chart and number 12 on the ARIA charts.

Her tenth studio album, Reasonable Woman, was released on 3 May 2024. Mark Kennedy wrote, for the Associated Press, "Sia hasn't lost a step [in her] ability to switch from hurt and broken ("I Forgive You") to ecstatic lover ("Towards the Sun") to vengeful, hell-releasing angel, like on "I Had a Heart". ... But on this outing, the ... forever catchy Sia is most interesting with others. In addition to the Khan duet, the best songs are "Dance Alone" with Kylie Minogue, "Incredible" with Labrinth and "Fame Won't Love You" with Paris Hilton"; he says, however, that Sia "rarely shift[s] out of third gear" on the album. Sia executive produced Paris Hilton's 2024 album, Infinite Icon.

A musical theatre adaptation of the film Saturday Church is set to premiere off-Broadway in late 2025. It has a book by Damon Cardasis and James Ijames and music and lyrics by Sia with additional music by Honey Dijon. A concert performance film made of her Nostalgic for the Present Tour was released in theatres in 2026 featuring Ziegler's dancing. In 2026 Sia sold a 50% stake in her catalog to Pophouse Entertainment for $180 million, covering both publishing and master recording rights.

== Artistry and musical style ==
At the start of her career, with the band Crisp, Sia performed acid jazz in Australia and later in London. With her first solo single, "Taken for Granted", she experimented with trip hop. When she joined Zero 7, she sang downtempo numbers. With Colour the Small One (2004) and Some People Have Real Problems (2007) she moved into jazz and folktronica, although the album's biggest hit, "Breathe Me", is described as alternative rock and a power ballad. Some People Have Real Problems expanded her connection with indie pop. Sia stated, "Colour the Small One ... couldn't be more derivative of Kings of Convenience and James Taylor and the things that Zero 7 were playing on the [tour] bus. I'm very easily influenced."

In 2009, after leaving Zero 7, Sia dedicated herself entirely to her solo career. We Are Born (2010), incorporated various pop styles, including synthpop and R&B, with introspective themes accompanied by more insistent and livelier rhythms. 1000 Forms of Fear (2014) consolidated her connection with pop (with traces of electropop, reggae and hip-hop), while This Is Acting (2016) is mostly composed of songs written by Sia with other female pop artists in mind, but the artists did not include the songs on their albums. Sia described songwriting for others as "play-acting". The Guardian's Kitty Empire commented that the latter album "provides an obvious counterpoint to Sia's more personal album of 2014, 1000 Forms of Fear, whose stonking single, 'Chandelier', tackled her intoxicated past. This Is Acting makes plain the fact of manufacture – a process akin to bespoke tailoring." The record also alternates reggae and electropop with more introspective themes.

Sia's music blends pop, folk and electronica. Her voice has been described as "deep, playful, and powerful". In Sia's 2016 live performances, her music was part of performance-art-like shows that involved dance and theatrical effects. An MTV News writer opined that "Sia's throaty, slurred vocals are her norm", while a contributor to The Fader noted that "in the Billboard Hot 100 landscape, Sia's songwriting voice, which deals with depression and addiction, is singular – her actual voice even more so." Everyday Is Christmas (2017), Sia's first release of Christmas music, is a pop album that gives old-fashioned holiday music "some 21st century pop gloss" and is made for those who grow tired of the classics. Music – Songs from and Inspired by the Motion Picture (2021) further developed Sia's pop music catalogue, with the album incorporating more electropop and reggae, alongside R&B and EDM. National Public Radio called Sia "the 21st century's most resilient songwriter".

== Accolades and recognition ==
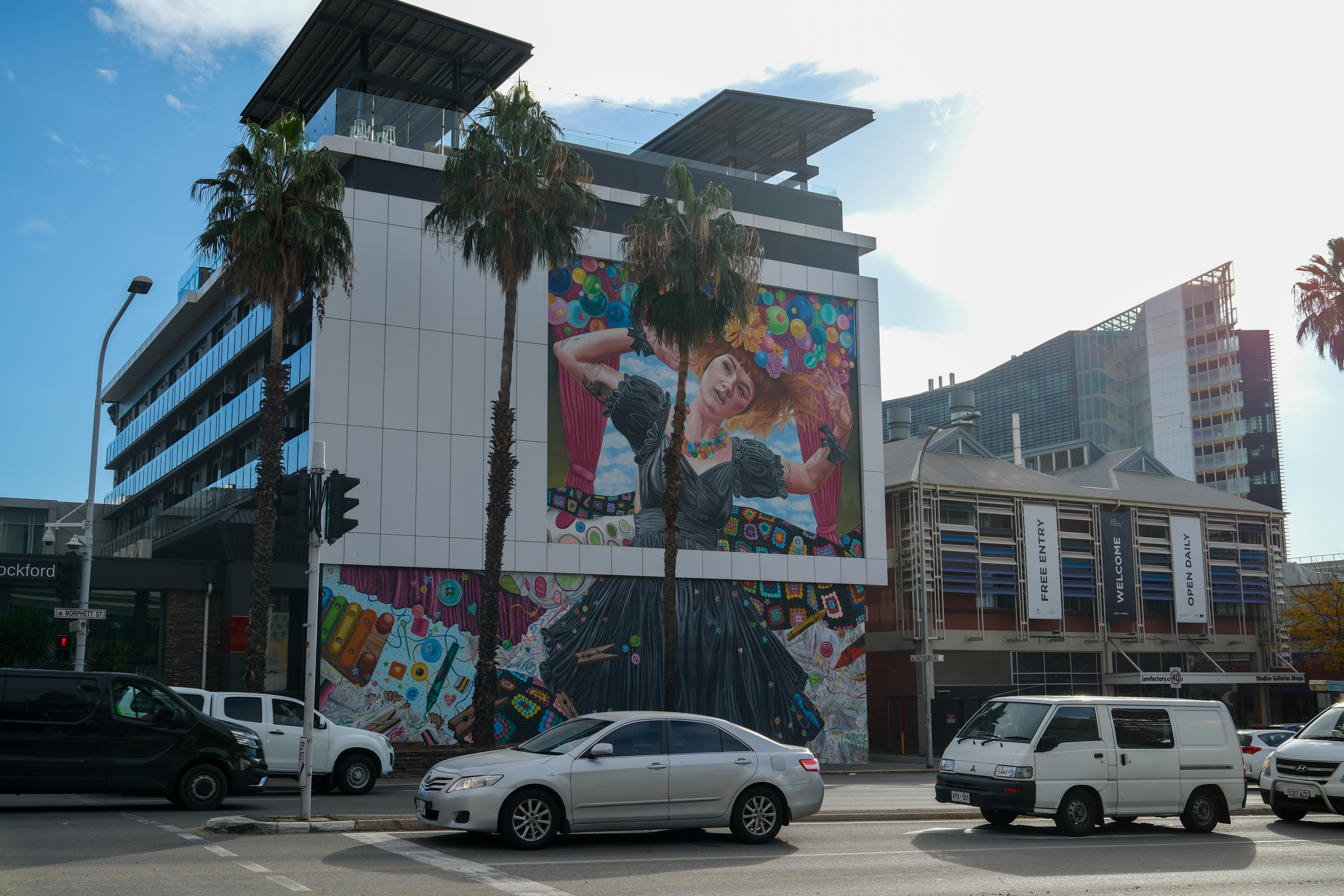
She Imagined Buttons mural and Sia Furler Lane in Adelaide

Sia has received an array of accolades, including ARIA Awards, an MTV Video Music Award and nine nominations for Grammy Awards.

In March 2021, a laneway in Adelaide city centre was renamed Sia Furler Lane, and a mural titled She Imagined Buttons was painted on a wall nearby to commemorate Sia's 2011 performance in Adelaide. As of October 2022, Sia has 15 entries on the APRA billion streams list, the most of any artist.

== Other ventures ==
In the 2014 South Park episode "The Cissy", Sia provided the vocals for the fictional Lorde track "Push (Feeling Good on a Wednesday)". In 2016 Sia covered "Blackbird" by the Beatles for the Netflix original series Beat Bugs. She appeared in the 2017 animated film My Little Pony: The Movie as the voice of pop star Songbird Serenade. She also contributed an original song, "Rainbow", to the film's soundtrack. Sia wrote the songs for the soundtrack to the 2018 musical film Vox Lux, with a score by Scott Walker.

She wrote a screenplay, based on a story that she had written in 2007, for the 2021 musical film, Music, which starred Ziegler, Kate Hudson and Leslie Odom Jr. Sia also directed the film and wrote its soundtrack. The film was released in Australia in January 2021 and in select IMAX theatres in the US for one night on 10 February 2021, followed by an on-demand release. It received negative reviews from critics and generated controversy for its depiction of autism. Sia said after the release of the film and subsequent backlash that she was diagnosed with autism. It was nominated for Best Motion Picture – Musical or Comedy at the 78th Golden Globe Awards. As director of Music, Sia later won the Golden Raspberry Award for Worst Director.

=== Philanthropy ===
Sia has been noted for her philanthropic gestures over the years. Prior to Thanksgiving in 2019, at a Palm Springs, California, Walmart and TJ Maxx, Sia paid for people's groceries and shopping in disguise. During the COVID-19 pandemic in 2020, Sia pledged to donate $1 million to CORE Response; she also donated the proceeds from her single "Saved My Life" to CORE Response's and AmeriCares' relief efforts. The same year she donated $100,000 to Australians in need in collaboration with Nova FM DJs Fitzy & Wippa and another $100,000 to community bail funds in support of the Black Lives Matter movement.

Since 2016, Sia has given money to her favourite contestants in the reality television series Survivor; the tradition has been billed the "Sia Award". At the end of the 45th season, she had given a total of $1 million to contestants over the years.

=== Animal activism ===
Sia is a vegetarian and an "animal lover". She has been an advocate for animals throughout her career. In 2010, she participated in a PETA campaign to tackle animal overpopulation and encourage people to spay or neuter their pets. She performed her song "I'm in Here" at the Beagle Freedom Project Gala in 2013, and, in 2015, "Free the Animal" was used for PETA public service announcements supporting cruelty-free fashion. During her Nostalgic for the Present Tour in 2016, Sia partnered with various animal rescue organisations to set up dog adoption fairs at each of the shows. In 2017, she released another public service announcement, in collaboration with the ASPCA, using her song "Puppies Are Forever", to encourage pet adoption. Sia co-narrated the 2018 animal rights documentary Dominion.

== Personal life ==
=== Relationships and family ===
After Crisp disbanded in 1997, Sia moved to London to be with her boyfriend Dan Pontifex. While on her way to England, she received the news that Pontifex had been hit by a car and died in hospital. She returned to Australia but received a call from one of Pontifex's former housemates, who invited her to stay in London. Her 2001 album Healing Is Difficult lyrically deals with Pontifex's death: "I was pretty fucked up after Dan died. I couldn't really feel anything", Sia recalled in a 2007 interview for The Sunday Times: "We ... got shit-faced on drugs and Special Brew. Unfortunately, that bender lasted six years for me."

Sia married documentary filmmaker Erik Anders Lang at her home in Palm Springs, California, in August 2014. The couple divorced in 2016. During a 2014 appearance on The Howard Stern Show, when asked if she was religious she responded, "I believe in a higher power and it's called 'Whatever Dude' and he's a queer, surfing Santa that's a bit like my grandpa, so yes." In the same interview, she stated that she is a feminist and that Whatever Dude divinely inspired the lyrics she wrote for Rihanna's song "Diamonds". One of Sia's hand tattoos reads "Whatever Dude". She is a cousin of Australian Christian rock musician Peter Furler.

In 2019, Sia adopted two black American boys who were ageing out of the foster care system. In 2020, she announced that she had become a grandmother when one of her two 19-year-old sons had fathered twins. In December 2022, she married Dan Bernad, followed by a ceremony in Portofino, Italy, in May 2023. The couple had one child together, born on 27 March 2024. They separated, and Sia filed for divorce from Bernad in March 2025. Agreements were reached regarding spousal support in December 2025 and joint custody and child support in April 2026, respectively.

=== Sexuality ===
In 2008, Sia discussed her sexual orientation in interviews and revealed her relationship with JD Samson; they broke up in 2011. When asked about her sexuality in 2009, she said, "I've always dated boys and girls and anything in between. I don't care what gender you are, it's about people. ... I've always been... well, flexible is the word I would use." Sia identified as queer on Twitter in 2013.

=== Health ===
Sia has experienced depression and addictions to painkillers and alcohol. In 2010, she wrote a suicide note, planning to overdose; a friend phoned her and, unintentionally, saved her life. Afterwards, Sia joined Alcoholics Anonymous. Sia cancelled various promotional events and shows due to her poor health in 2010. She mentioned having extreme lethargy and panic attacks, and considered retiring permanently from performing and touring. Sia also discussed being diagnosed with Graves' disease. Later that year, she said her health was improving after rest and thyroid suppression therapy.

In 2019, Sia stated that she has Ehlers–Danlos syndrome. She has also said that she was diagnosed with complex post-traumatic stress disorder, stemming from childhood traumas including being sexually abused at the age of nine. Sia said that due to the backlash she received regarding her 2021 film Music, she relapsed, became suicidal again and returned to rehabilitation.

== Discography ==
- OnlySee (1997)
- Healing Is Difficult (2001)
- Colour the Small One (2004)
- Some People Have Real Problems (2008)
- We Are Born (2010)
- 1000 Forms of Fear (2014)
- This Is Acting (2016)
- Everyday Is Christmas (2017)
- Music (2021)
- Reasonable Woman (2024)

== Tours ==
- We Meaning You Tour (2010–2011)
- We Are Born Tour (2011)
- Nostalgic for the Present Tour (2016–2017)

== Filmography ==
Sia wrote or performed songs on the following film soundtracks:

- The Twilight Saga: Eclipse (2010)
- Burlesque (2010; used again in the film's stage adaptation)
- The Great Gatsby (2013)
- The Hunger Games: Catching Fire (2013)
- Annie (2014)
- Transparent (2015)
- Racing Extinction (2015)
- Fifty Shades of Grey (2015)
- Pitch Perfect 2 (2015)
- San Andreas (2015)
- Beat Bugs (2016)
- The Eagle Huntress (2016)
- Zootopia (2016)
- Finding Dory (2016)
- The Neon Demon (2016)
- Star Trek Beyond (2016)
- Lion (2016)
- Fifty Shades Darker (2017)
- Wonder Woman (2017)
- My Little Pony: The Movie (2017)
- Fifty Shades Freed (2018)
- A Wrinkle in Time (2018)
- Charming (2018)
- Dumplin' (2018)
- Vox Lux (2018)
- Seven Worlds, One Planet (2019)
- Dolittle (2020)
- Music (2021)
- Kangaroo Valley (2022)
- Sia: Nostalgic for the Present (2026)

=== Film roles ===
Year	Title	Role	Notes
2004	Piccadilly Jim	New York Bar Singer	Cameo
2014	Annie	Animal Care & Control Volunteer	Cameo
2017	My Little Pony: The Movie	Songbird Serenade	Voice
2018	Peter Rabbit	Mrs. Tiggy-Winkle	Voice
2018	Dominion	Narrator	Documentary
2018	Charming	Half-Oracle	Voice
2021	Music	Popstar Without Borders	Writer, director, producer
2021	Peter Rabbit 2: The Runaway	Mrs. Tiggy-Winkle	Voice

=== Television roles ===
Year	Title	Role	Notes
1997	Home and Away	Herself	Cameo
2014	South Park	Lorde (singing voice)	Season 18; Episode 3: "The Cissy"
2015	Transparent	Puppet	Season 2; Episode 9: "Man on the Land"
2018	Nobodies	Herself	Season 2; Episode 9: "Rob in the Hood"
2019	Scooby-Doo and Guess Who?	Herself	Season 1; Episode 11: "Now You Sia, Now You Don't!"
2021	Waffles + Mochi	Tomato (singing voice)	Season 1; Episode 1: "Tomato"
2026	Jury Duty	Herself	Season 2; Episode 6: "Culture Fit"

== See also ==
- List of artists who reached number one in the United States

Preceded by One Direction	Saturday Night Live musical guest 17 January 2015	Succeeded by Blake Shelton
