= International Federation of Agricultural Producers =

International organization

- Federation Internationale des Producteurs Agricoles
- Abbreviation: IFAP
- Formation: 1946
- Dissolved: 2010 (bankruptcy)
- Type: Non-Profit
- Headquarters: Paris, France
- Region served: Global
- Main organ: Assembly

The International Federation of Agricultural Producers (IFAP), (French: Federation Internationale des Producteurs Agricoles (FIPA)) was an organization that advocated on the international level for member farm organizations. Established in 1946, the organization was liquidated by the French Tribunal de grande instance de Paris in a judgement made on 4 November 2010, to proceed with the liquidation of IFAP after an economic and political crisis. The Federation had gone through severe financial problems.

IFAP represented over 600 million farm families grouped in 120 national organizations in 79 countries. It was a global network in which farmers from industrialized and developing countries exchanged concerns and set common priorities. IFAP was founded in 1946 to advocate farmers' interests at the international level, and had General Consultative Status with the Economic and Social Council of the United Nations.

== Post-liquidation United Nations representation ==
At the time of its liquidation, IFAP held general consultative status with the United Nations Economic and Social Council (ECOSOC), originally granted in 1947. The Tribunal de grande instance de Paris ordered the federation's judicial liquidation on 4 November 2010. Nevertheless, IFAP's name continued to be used in United Nations proceedings during 2011. A January 2011 participant list for a high-level meeting of the United Nations Commission on Sustainable Development identified Robynne Anderson under “Farmers, IFAP”, and an April 2011 United Nations participant list described her as IFAP's “Main Representative to UN”. On 9 May 2011, ECOSOC also circulated a written statement submitted in IFAP's name, identifying it as an organization holding general consultative status granted in 1947.

The World Farmers' Organisation (WFO) was established in 2011 by organizations drawn substantially from IFAP's former constituency. Political scientists Marc Edelman and Saturnino M. Borras Jr. wrote that WFO's membership and ideology mirrored those of IFAP and that it was widely regarded as IFAP's successor. By September 2011, an FAO–OECD meeting report identified Anderson as WFO's “Main Representative to the UN”.

The United Nations Civil Society Participation database subsequently conflated aspects of the two organizations. As of August 2026, the former IFAP profile remained headed “International Federation of Agricultural Producers” but gave its acronym as “WFO” and contained WFO's Rome address, website, mission and a 2011 registration year. A separate database profile also existed for the World Farmers Organisation. The consultative-status pages associated with both profiles stated that the organization concerned was not in consultative status with ECOSOC. The public United Nations record therefore documents continued post-liquidation use of IFAP's identity and a later administrative conflation of IFAP and WFO, but does not record an ECOSOC decision formally transferring IFAP's consultative status to WFO.
