= Landcare Australia =

Not-for-profit organisation

Landcare Australia is a community-based not-for-profit organisation that involves local volunteer groups working to repair the natural environment. Initially, projects focused on agricultural farmland. The idea was that farmers, conservationists, and scientists could work together to improve both farm quality and natural ecosystems.

The organisation has grown and diversified since its small-scale origins in the 1980s. The Landcare concept has grown to include groups working on urban green spaces, waterways, beaches, and larger parklands. Landcare Australia now includes initiatives such as Coastcare and Junior Landcare groups. These initiatives are distinct from Caring for Country programs led by Aboriginal and Torres Strait Islander people.

== History ==
The concept of landcare brings people together who share a common problem and often live within the same drainage basin, or catchment, an area that collects and directs water to a common point. By working together in a catchment, land degradation problems can be tackled successfully. Many of the first groups were set up to eradicate rabbits in Australia and to address other specific farmland degradation issues. The Landcare concept has now extended beyond this to include rural land management, lifestyle, and community development.

The movement began in Victoria, Australia, in 1986 when a group of farmers near St Arnaud in central Victoria formed the first Landcare group, a voluntary group focused on restoring the natural environment. Since then, the Landcare concept has spread across Australia and to approximately 15 other countries. There are approximately 4000 Landcare groups in Australia.

Key figures in the development of Landcare were Rick Farley of the National Farmers Federation, environmental advocate Barbara Hardy and Phillip Toyne, both from the Australian Conservation Foundation. Former premier of Victoria, Joan Kirner, and Heather Mitchell were also early proponents of the idea.

Landcare as an organisation received significant support when the Australian Federal Government of Prime Minister Bob Hawke declared a Decade of Landcare and established a continuing funding mechanism to support volunteers in continuing and expanding their work.

== Activities ==
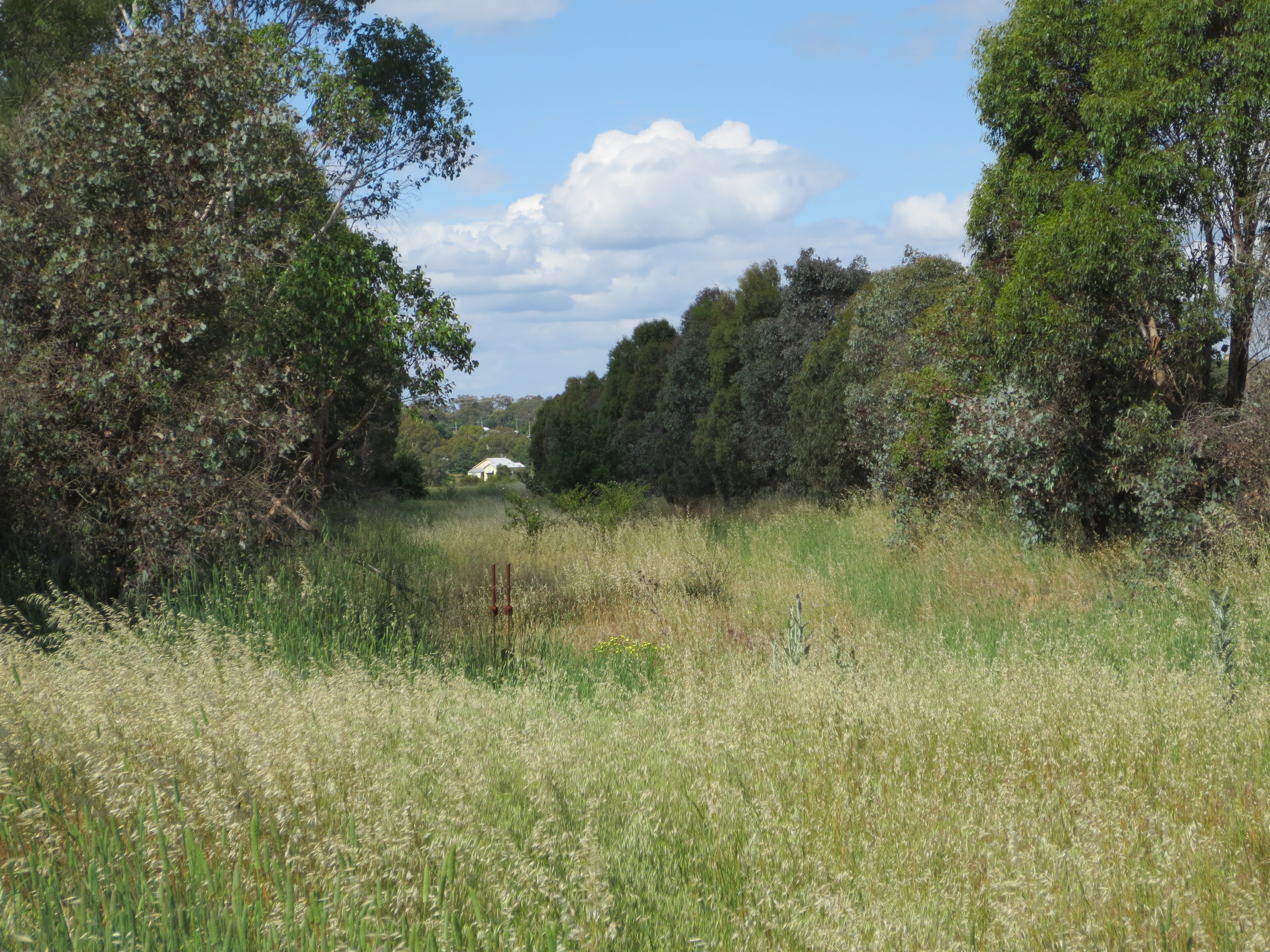
Landcare Australia was one of the supporters of this regenerated habitat for the superb parrot.

The range of activities now included within Landcare programs has expanded to include research that measures the effectiveness of previous activities, fencing out stock so that vegetation can regrow, creating windbreaks to protect livestock, managing waterways and improving drainage, and combating soil salinity. Many of the tasks are carried out to correct mistakes in farming practices from decades earlier, and sometimes, some projects involve sharing ideas related to caring for the land. Other activities include weed removal, using biological controls, and farm beautification.

== Affiliates ==
Landcare groups in Australia are supported by Landcare Australia as a national body as well as by national and state-based agencies or organisations, including:

- Landcare ACT
- Landcare NSW
- Landcare NT
- The Landcare Association of South Australia, aka Landcare SA
- Queensland Water & Land Carers
- Landcare Victoria Inc, formed in 2017 when the Farm Tree and Landcare Association merged with the Victorian Landcare Council in 2017
- Landcare Tasmania and
- The Western Australia Landcare Network, formed May 2013

Landcare Australia maintains the online National Landcare Directory, which includes a wide variety of community-based groups across Australia, including landcare networks and groups, farmers, landholders, traditional custodians, junior groups and coastcare groups.

The National Landcare Network is the national peak body representing community landcare groups in Australia. Its aim is to "represent, support, and foster the community Landcare movement". As of 2023, its members include around 2000 landcare organisations from the states and territories, representing around 6000 individual Landcare groups.

== Governance ==
The CEO of Landcare Australia as of May 2026 is Shane Norrish. The organisation is governed by a board, headed by chair Peter Garrett, who was appointed in May 2026.

== Funding ==
Landcare Australia is funded through a combination of Australian government programs, corporate partnerships, and community support. Major government initiatives, including the National landcare Program, provide funding for environmental restoration and community-based projects.

The organization also ncollaborates with corporate and philanthropic partners to support conservation and sustainable land management initiatives. Corporate partnerships have included collbaoration with companies such as Country Road, The a2 Milk Company, Bupa, and 4 Pines Brewing Company.

Philanthropic support has also been provided by foundations such as the lan Potter Foundation and the Ross Trust.

== National Landcare Awards ==
Landcare Australia runs the biennial National Landcare Awards. The 2020 awards ceremony was postponed to August 2021 owing to the COVID-19 pandemic in Australia, with an awards ceremony hosted by ABC TV presenter Costa Georgiadis was held online, along with the Landcare Australia conference. Awards were given in over nine categories, including: youth, Indigenous, soil care, and farming.

== Caring for Country ==
There are a number of initiatives known as Caring for Country in operation. These focus on indigenous communities and traditional custodians working to manage and restore Indigenous lands and to preserve the environment using their cultural knowledge and connection to Country, and are often carried out in collaboration with non-Indigenous people and organisations. The structure and funding of Caring for Country projects is often different to local Landcare groups. Federal Government Landcare (including the National Landcare Program and Caring for Our Country initiatives) has funded projects and Indigenous ranger positions.

== Human health and wellbeing ==
As well as caring for land and Country, there has been increasing focus within Landcare Australia during the 21st century on the positive benefits of environmental volunteering on human health and wellbeing.

== See also ==
- Conservation in Australia
- Environmental issues in Australia
- Bushcare Group
