= Evelyn Nguleka =

Zambian farmer (1970–2017)

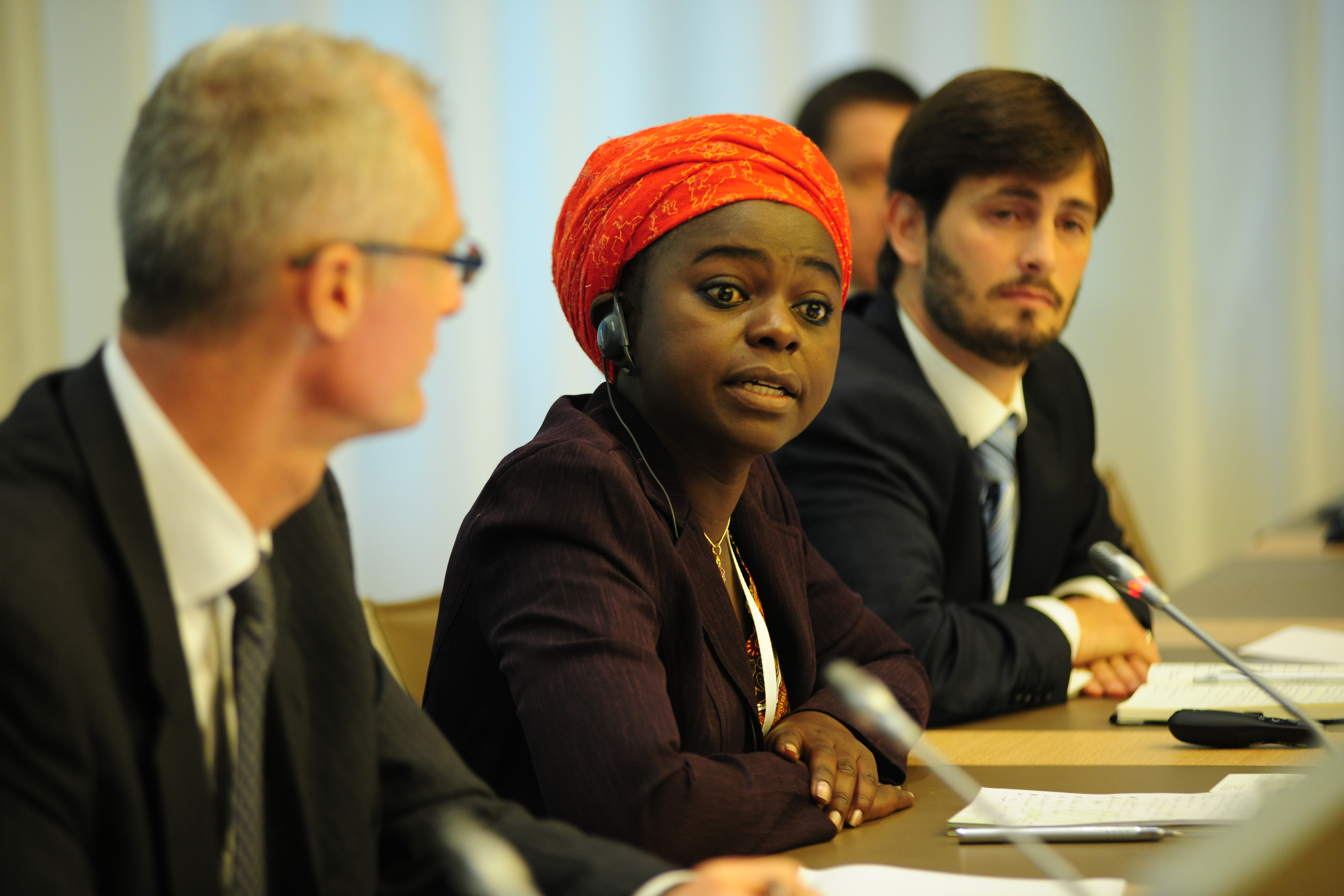
- Nguleka speaking at the World Trade Organization Public Forum in 2015
- Born: 1970
- Died: February 5, 2017 (aged 46–47); Lusaka, Zambia

Evelyn Nguleka (1970 – February 5, 2017) was a veterinarian, farmer, and president of the World Farmers' Organisation from mid-2015 to mid-2016.

== Early life and education ==
Evelyn Nguleka was born in 1970 in Zambia.

Raised by her grandmother in Ndola, Nguleka attended Fatima Girls' Secondary School. She earned a degree in veterinary medicine from the University of Lusaka.

She studied veterinary science at the University of Zambia, and gained an international diploma in poultry handling from Barneveld college in the Netherlands.

== Career ==
Nguleka was a small farmer who specialized in poultry and goats, and in treating diseases in these animals.

She became the first female president of the Zambia National Farmers' Union (ZNFU) upon her election in 2013. She supported the rights of small farmers and often brought up inconsistencies in how farmers of different crops and farm sizes were treated as a homogenized group.

Upon her election to the presidency of the World Farmers' Organisation (WFO) in 2015, after appointment as acting president in October 2014, she stated: "For too long the role of the farmer was taken for granted, almost as if we were vending machines for food, called to respond to that role, who carry out with joy the task of feeding the planet in a compulsory and annihilating way, without margins of profits."

While serving as the president of the WFO, she also worked in Switzerland.

== Resignation ==
In September 2016, she resigned from both the WFO and ZNFU, after being charged and arrested by the Zambian Drug Enforcement Commission alongside ZNFU executive director Ndambo Ndambo for corruption. This occurred after the Finnish and Swedish embassies ordered audits for Finnish and Swedish companies that had worked with ZNFU after suspected mismanagement of donations.

== Death ==
She died of an illness on February 5, 2017 in Lusaka.
