= We Are Born Tour =

2011 concert tour by Sia

- Tour by Sia
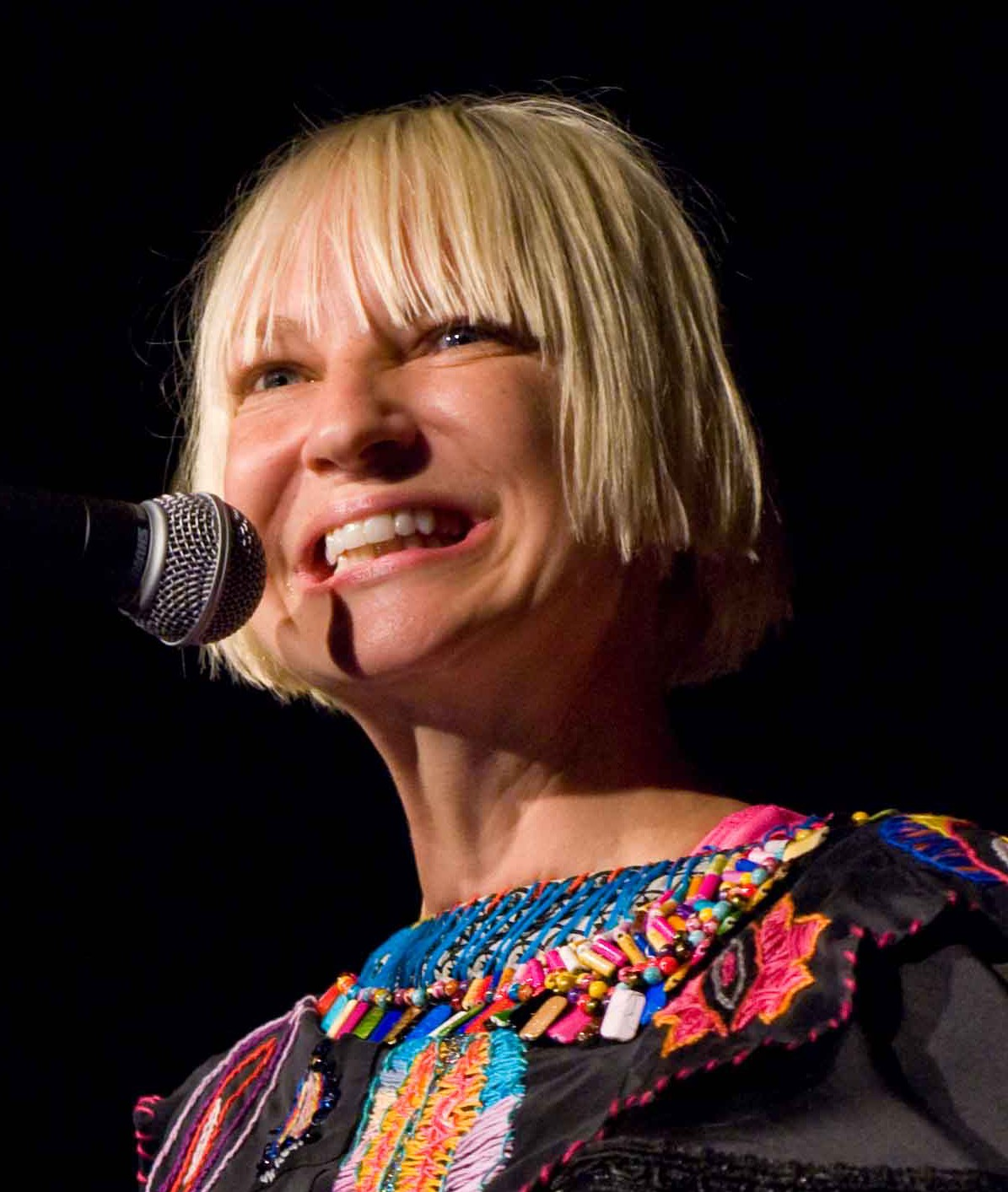
- Sia performs at the Showbox
- Associated album: We Are Born
- Start date: 21 July 2011
- End date: 19 August 2011
- Legs: 1
- No. of shows: 20 in North America

Sia concert chronology
- We Meaning You Tour (2010–11); We Are Born Tour (2011); Nostalgic for the Present Tour (2016–17)

The We Are Born Tour was the second concert tour by the Australian singer Sia in support of her fifth studio album, We Are Born (2010). It is a continuation of her 2010 tour, after several dates were cancelled.

== Opening acts ==
- Oh Land
- Ximena Sariñana (select dates)

== Setlist ==
The following setlist was obtained from the show held 21 July 2011, at First Avenue in Minneapolis, Minnesota. It does not represent all concerts for the duration of the tour.

1. "The Fight"
2. "Buttons"
3. "Oh Father"
4. "Hostage"
5. "Big Girl Little Girl"
6. "Cloud"
7. "I Go to Sleep"
8. "I'm Not Important to You"
9. "Be Good to Me"
10. "Taken for Granted"
11. "Hurting Me Now"
12. "Soon We'll Be Found"
13. "My Love"
14. "Never Gonna Leave Me"
15. "I'm In Here"

Encore

16. "Clap Your Hands"
17. "Breathe Me"

== Tour dates ==
Date	City	Country	Venue
North America
21 July 2011	Minneapolis	United States	First Avenue
22 July 2011	Chicago	United States	Metro
23 July 2011	Detroit	United States	Saint Andrew's Hall
24 July 2011	Toronto	Canada	Phoenix Concert Theatre
26 July 2011	New York City	United States	Webster Hall
27 July 2011	New York City	United States	Webster Hall
28 July 2011	Washington, D.C.	United States	9:30 Club
30 July 2011^{[A]}	Montreal	Canada	Scène Verte
31 July 2011	Boston	United States	House of Blues
1 August 2011	Philadelphia	United States	Trocadero Theatre
3 August 2011	Atlanta	United States	Variety Playhouse
5 August 2011	New Orleans	United States	House of Blues
6 August 2011	Houston	United States	Warehouse Live
7 August 2011	Dallas	United States	Granada Theater
10 August 2011	Los Angeles	United States	Wiltern Theatre
11 August 2011	San Diego	United States	House of Blues
13 August 2011^{[B]}	San Francisco	United States	Speedway Meadow
16 August 2011	Portland	United States	Wonder Ballroom
17 August 2011	Seattle	United States	Showbox SoDo
19 August 2011	Vancouver	Canada	Commodore Ballroom

Festivals and other miscellaneous performances
^{A} This concert was a part of the "Osheaga Music and Arts Festival
^{B} This concert was a part of the "Outside Lands Music and Arts Festival"

=== Box office score data ===
Venue	City	Tickets sold / available	Gross revenue
Metro	Chicago	1,150 / 1,150 (100%)	$27,600
Phoenix Concert Theatre	Toronto	918 / 1,100 (83%)	$23,849
9:30 Club	Washington, D.C.	1,200 / 1,200 (100%)	$30,000
