= Phillip Toyne =

External audio
- Oral history recording by Toyne in 2013, National Library of Australia collection
- Addresses to the National Press Club in March 1991, November 1991, and July 1992

Phillip Toyne AO (16 November 1947 – 13 June 2015) was an Australian environmental and Indigenous rights activist, lawyer, and founder of Landcare Australia.

== Early life and education ==
Phillip Toyne was born on 16 November 1947.

He first earned a law degree, and then received a Diploma of Education from La Trobe University in 1973.

== Career ==
From 1973 until 1986, Toyne worked in central Australia. He was the only teacher at an Aboriginal school at Haasts Bluff, Northern Territory, and then worked as a solicitor and barrister in Alice Springs.

He was the first lawyer who worked for the Pitjantjatjara people, and, with Premier of South Australia Don Dunstan, created the Anangu Pitjantjatjara Yankunytjatjara Land Rights Act 1981 (South Australia). He also negotiated the successful native title claim of the traditional owners of Uluru in 1983.

He was the head of the Australian Conservation Foundation from 1986 to 1992.

Later in life he helped to establish a project in which the Olkola people of the Cape York Peninsula practise traditional burning as part of a Commonwealth government carbon farming initiative, called Natural Carbon.

== Recognition ==
Toyne was awarded the title of Officer of the Order of Australia in 2012, "For distinguished service to environmental law through executive and advisory roles, particularly the introduction of a National Landcare Program, to the protection and restoration of Australian landscapes, and to the Indigenous community."

== Personal life ==
Toyne lived in Gundaroo. He was married to Molly Olson and they had three children.

He was a friend of Doug Humann at Bush Heritage Australia.

== Publications ==
Toyne was the author of two books:

- Growing up the country: the Pitjantjatjara struggle for their land (1984), ISBN 9780140076417
- The reluctant nation: environment, law, and politics in Australia (1994), ISBN 9780733303753

== Death and legacy ==
Toyne died in 2015 of bowel cancer, aged 67.

Apart from the legacy of Landcare Australia, he influenced many people to care better for the environment, as well as "proper recognition of Indigenous people, their culture and lore".
