= Fiona Simson =

Australian vice-president of the World Farmers' Organisation

- Education: University of Canberra
- Occupation: Vice-president World Farmers' Organisation
- Board member of: Australian Centre for International Agricultural Research, Future Food Systems.

Fiona Simson is the vice-president of the World Farmers' Organisation. She was the first woman president of the National Farmers' Federation.

== Education and early life ==
Simson grew up on a farm near Armidale, in NSW, Australia. She was a rotary exchange student, in 1982 in Denmark.

Simson followed a career in corporate life, followed by a role in local government. She graduated from Bachelor of Arts, at the University of Canberra and is a graduate of the Australian Company Directors. In 2006, she successfully campaigned to stop mining companies from extracting coal seam gas, in central NSW, Caroona.

== Career ==
Simson ran a family farming business, including a broad acre farming and commercial breeding business, and she was elected as a Councillor in the Liverpool Plains Shire Council.

In 2016, Simson was elected President of the National Farmers' Federation. She is an advisor for Australia's Foreign Affairs Minister, on the topic of agricultural research and development. She is also a board member on the Australian Made Campaign, AgStewardship Australia, and the Board of NRMA (NSW). She is also on the board of the Australian Farmers Fighting Fund.

Simson was appointed to the statutory Nature Repair Committee in 2024. She was also a Director of the Biodiversity Conservation Trust of NSW, and One Basin CRC. Simson is Patron of the National Rural Press Clue, and of the Program for NFF Diversity in Leadership.

Also in 2024, Simson became an honorary Fellow of the Australian Academy of Technological Sciences and Engineering, in 2024.

Simson was elected as the first Australian vice president of the World Farmers' Organisation in 2024.

== Awards and honours ==
- 2016 – First female president of National Farmers' Federation.
- 2023 – Rabobank Leadership award.
- 2024 – honorary Fellow of the Australian Academy of Technological Sciences and Engineering.
- 2024 – Appointment to Climate Change Authority.
