= Mudginberri dispute =

Coordinates: 12°37′S 132°52′E

The Mudginberri abattoir was the focus of a major industrial relations dispute from 1983 to 1985 in Australia's Northern Territory which was notable for being the first successful use of legal sanctions against a union since the gaoling of Victorian Tramways union leader Clarrie O'Shea in 1969. The successful prosecution of the Australasian Meat Industry Employees Union (AMIEU) under section 45D of the Trade Practices Act (Secondary boycott provisions) was seen by the National Farmers Federation and the developing New Right in and outside the Liberal Party of Australia as a breakthrough in a campaign to break the power of the unions and introduce contract employment.

== Location ==
The Mudginberri station is about 250 km east of Darwin along the Arnhem Highway in the Northern Territory of Australia. The abattoir was built in the early 1970s to take advantage of the large numbers of feral buffalo in the area.

The country itself is mainly low-lying black soil country between the East Alligator and South Alligator Rivers with the Arnhem Land escarpment to the east. The station's abattoir is about 15 kilometres from Jabiru to the south and much the same distance from the Ranger Uranium Mine to the north.

== Background ==
The Australian Meat Industry was in serious decline by the 1980s, with 35 abattoir closures across Australia between 1979 and 1982. Cattle numbers were also being cut in an attempt to eradicate brucellosis and tuberculosis from the cattle herd. This also meant the reduction in the buffalo herd which Mudginberri primarily processed for the export trade.

In the early 1980s of the dozen abattoirs operating in the NT, only Katherine and Darwin abattoirs were bound by the industrial award, while other abattoirs were hiring workers on individual contracts without union involvement. Most of those employed in the Mudginberri abattoir were itinerant workers who came through each year to make good money during the dry season, whereas the larger Katherine meatworks consisted of mainly permanent residents.

Workers were not employed directly by the abattoir owner Jan Pendarvis, but by 3 contractors engaged by the owner. The contractors had most to lose from an award based tally system according to union accounts. According to AMIEU official Allan Anderson "the reason why he (Pendarvis) succeeded was that he employed three contractors and the three contractors were viewed by the Court as being the employer, but in the essence they were really J Pendarvis's employees and J Pendarvis was, of course, the third party that was in fact effected [sic] by that industrial dispute. And, as such, they found against us that we had to pay the damages that he had incurred during that industrial dispute..."

Mudginberri was a member of the Northern Territory Cattlemen's Association which was, in turn, a member of the National Farmers' Federation (NFF). The Meat and Allied Trades Federation of Australia (MATFA), a representative body of meat processors, and the NFF chose to become involved in the dispute.

Paul Houlihan, Industrial Director of the NFF claimed the NFF wanted to get involved in the dispute due to "the extreme inefficiencies that exist in most parts of the meat processing industry, due to the enormously powerful position enjoyed in the industry by the AMIEU, and, in particular, because of the most common piecework method employed, that is the unit tally system."

== The dispute ==
In 1983, the Australasian Meat Industry Employees Union (AMIEU) served a log of claims on Mudginberri and on all other abattoirs in the Northern Territory, seeking a unit tally system to be set up (a log of claims was served on employers when a union wished to create a new award for the industry) on award conditions similar to that operating at the Katherine abattoir.

In July 1984, the AMIEU increased pressure on the dispute by setting up picket lines at two Northern Territory abattoirs – Point Stuart and Mudginberri. A settlement of this dispute led to a withdrawal of the picket with each side paying its own costs.

However, hearings continued on the details of the industrial award that would be made for abattoirs. A decision on the award was handed down in April 1985 by Commissioner McKenzie which specified minimum award standards but also included a clause upholding individual non-union contracts negotiated without union involvement, which the union would not consider.

The employees at Mudginberri had negotiated their own employment contracts without any union involvement. The union was concerned that wages and conditions at Mudginberri did not comply with standard award entitlements and that essentially "the meat industry was a piecework industry whereby you're paid on the amount of work that you did" and "that employees were in fact being dudded on that particular situation by as much as $400 and $500 a week. Because they were carrying out far greater productivity, certainly being paid more, but had they been employed under the worst award that we had anywhere in Australia they would have been about $400 a week ahead." according Anderson. But the Mudginberri workers claimed they were happy with their contracts and most refused to support the picket. Most of the workforce were members of the AMIEU but had little contact with the union.

Picket lines were established on 9 May 1985 at the Victoria River, Mudginberri and Alice Springs abattoirs. Almost unanimously (there were a couple of exceptions that joined the picket line), workers at Mudginberri defied the union instructions and continued to work. Many of the pickets at Mudginberri were from the Katherine abattoir which had failed to open that season with management citing unavailability of stock due to dry conditions, but a conflicting report in the National Farmer said that cattle producers had voted to boycott Katherine meatworks while it "continues to side with unreasonable AMIEU claims". The NT Cattlemen's Association denied such a vote had been taken. The picket received ACTU endorsement on 17 May.

Commonwealth meat inspectors refused to cross the picket line and were suspended without pay, thus stopping production at the abattoir. Work could not resume until 24 June when the NT Government provided inspectors, however state inspectors could only authorise the meat for domestic consumption at half the price of meat graded for export.

According to Paul Houlihan from the NFF, the Commonwealth meat inspectors usually resided in accommodation on Mudginberri Station, but at the request of the inspectors at the start of 1985 that they should stay in the 'closed' uranium mining township of Jabiru, necessitating appropriate authorisation and changes to regulations. Houlihan claims this was planned months in advance so that the inspectors would have to face crossing a picketline, than already being behind it.

The Industrial Relations Commission held conferences but failed to stop the dispute. As a result, Jay Pendarvis, the owner of Mudginberri abattoir, obtained an injunction under Section 45D (Secondary boycott provisions) of Australia's Trade Practices Act preventing the AMIEU from picketing the abattoir. The AMIEU refused to comply with the Federal Court injunction to lift the picket and was initially fined $44,000. On 12 July the union had its assets seized for non-payment of this fine. This action resulted in 20,000 meatworkers going on strike on 25 July. Two further national strikes were held on 7 August and 30 August which included maritime and transport workers.

During August Prime Minister Bob Hawke and Industrial Relations Minister Ralph Willis attempted to have meetings between the disputing parties in Canberra but Pendarvis, the MATFA and the NFF, refused to attend saying the dispute was sub judice. On 12 August the employers faxed their terms of settlement for the dispute to the Prime Minister which included removal of all picket lines, a 2-year ban on strikes, and pay $2.5million damages to Pendarvis as well as all accumulated legal costs.

AMIEU organiser Jack O'Toole reflected in 1995: "At that stage we knew that we weren't dealing with people who were looking for a settlement so much as an overwhelming victory". The AMEIU by this stage were interested in finding a compromise to the dispute and on 27 August lodged with the Arbitration Commission an application to vary the McKenzie award to allow union involvement in contract negotiations and strengthening the preference for unionists clause. So that the case could be heard before the full bench of the Arbitration Commission, all picket lines were lifted in early September. Hearings continued in November and December with a decision handed down on 27 March 1986 which granted the union two concessions: any contract arrangements had to be notified to the union and the decision had no implications beyond the meat industry in the NT.

== Aftermath ==
The dispute had come at the expense of a four-month picket line and a total of $144,000 in fines against the union and a pending lawsuit for damages under Section 45D of the Trade Practices Act. The Mudginberri dispute took 27 court cases and two years of litigation. Although the NFF and MATFA worked together during the dispute, once a settlement was reached MATFA informed the ACTU it would not take part in any damages claim as it was only concerned with the health of its industry and not with an ideological battle with the trade union movement.

Jay Pendarvis, the Manager of Mudginberri Station, was eventually awarded $1,759,444 damages. In subsequent interviews Pendarvis claimed he was not anti-union but that he believed the union was misusing its power by trying to impose an unworkable award on his business. Half way through 1985 Pendarvis had second thoughts about the dispute and the NFF tactics and said: "It became a power thing: 'We're going to destroy the unions'", but was convinced to remain committed to the NFF strategy by senior officials of the NFF.

In 1986 it was revealed in Business Review Weekly that the Country Liberal Party Government of the Northern Territory facilitated loans to Pendarvis with the proviso that he sue the union for damages. The union was able to survive financially through levies placed upon membership, and while the defeat briefly united members, the union was ultimately weakened as more experienced union officials resigned from exhaustion, according to union organisers Pat Roughan and Jack O'Toole.

In 1987, the Katherine abattoir reopened and began operating on a contract system with about half the previous workforce. Union activists were blacklisted from employment where previously the abattoir was unionised and working under award conditions. Mudginberri reportedly shut its doors within two seasons.

Ian McLachlan, who was president of the National Farmers Federation (NFF) during the dispute and later a minister in the Howard Government, wrote that Mudginberri "turned the tide" against union power and "changed the nature of industrial relations in Australia". John Howard, then leader of the Opposition, urged the creation of many more Mudginberris. Barrister for Pendarvis and the NFF was Peter Costello, who was to later co-found the H. R. Nicholls Society, act for Dollar Sweets in the Dollar Sweets dispute and go on to become the federal treasurer in the Howard Government and a prominent architect of the Howard Government Industrial Relations reforms.

By 1998 there were no functioning abattoirs in the Northern Territory.
