= Wide Comb dispute =

1983 Australian industrial dispute

The Wide Comb dispute was a landmark Australian industrial dispute. Australian sheep shearers, represented by the Australian Workers' Union, opposed the alteration of the Federal Pastoral Industry Award to allow the use of shearing equipment that used combs wider than 2.5 inches. Business and farming groups, such as the National Farmers Federation, supported the alteration of the award as they believed that the wider combs increased productivity.

The dispute culminated in a 10-week national strike by shearers in 1983 and was resolved by the decision of the Australian Conciliation and Arbitration Commission to allow the use of the wide comb shears.

The defeat of the AWU in the wide comb dispute has been widely cited as the cause of a decline in union membership and militancy amongst Australian shearers.

The historical background is covered in some detail in a book about industrial relations in Australian shearing through the twentieth century. The core problem had less to do with the traditional "class war" between shearers and the graziers, but arose from a longstanding cultural rift amongst shearers themselves. Union opposition to wide combs and the use of New Zealand shearers is also dramatised in Dennis McIntosh's 2008 novel Beaten by a blow: a shearer's story.

Moneymaking "gun" shearers were only too happy to use wide combs, which had been introduced by New Zealand shearers in Western Australia from the late-1960s. On the other hand, the AWU feared it would lead to the erosion of terms and conditions that had been built into the Pastoral Award over many decades, and diehard unionists resented the cavalier attitude of the moneymakers to these regulations.

At heart it was about AWU control over woolsheds at shearing time. The restriction on wide combs was a union rule dating from 1910, and it had formally been incorporated into the Award in 1926. The rule had been around for so long that few people had a very clear idea about how it had come about or why it was regarded as so sacred by the unionists. Not long after the dispute ended, in 1987, one independent observer suggested that it was "an argument about values" and "not about the facts". AWU officials described wide combs as "immoral and repulsive".
