= National Farmers' Federation =

Australian non-profit organisation representing farmers

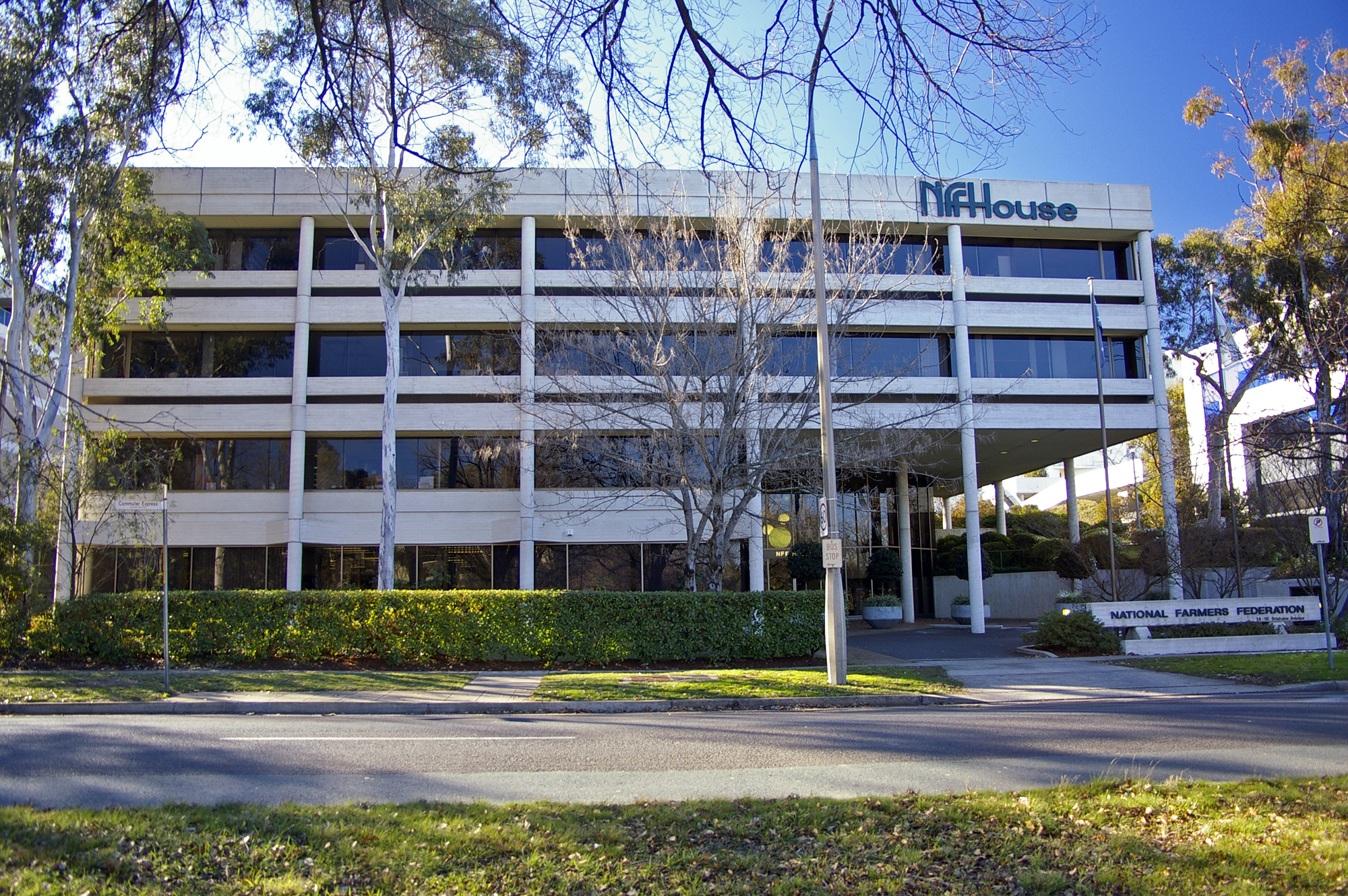
- National Farmers' Federation Headquarters in Barton, Australian Capital Territory.
- Founded: 1979
- Location: Barton, Australian Capital Territory
- Key people: Hamish McIntyre (President); Mike Guerin (Chief Executive)
- Website: nff.org.au

The National Farmers' Federation (NFF) is an Australian non-profit membership–based organisation that represents farmers and the agricultural sector in Australia. The NFF has been a key player in a number of industrial relations disputes, including the 1998 waterfront dispute.

As of July 2026 the president of the National Farmers' Federation is Hamish McIntyre since 2025; the organisation's Chief Executive is Mike Guerin, since March 2026.

== History ==
The NFF was formed in 1979.

NFF was a key player in a number of industrial relations disputes, including the 1998 Australian waterfront dispute; the shearing wide comb dispute; and the Mudginberri dispute.

== Key policy priorities ==
The NFF's key policy areas include farm business and productivity; access to markets; digital connectivity; natural resource management; biosecurity, health and welfare; education and training; and workplace relations. The NFF has been involved in a number of major policy debates in Australia, including most recently, the backpacker tax, the Murray-Darling Basin Plan, carbon tax, foreign investment, drought policy reform and livestock exports.

In February 2013, the NFF released the first Blueprint for Australian Agriculture. The blueprint is a strategic plan for the Australian agricultural sector and its supply chain, setting out its future direction. The blueprint is the first cross-industry plan for the sector, developed by the sector. In 2013, the NFF moved into the legacy phase of the blueprint: turning the blueprint document into action. The blueprint was developed with the support of Westpac, Woolworths Group and the Department of Agriculture, Fisheries and Forestry, with Westpac and Woolworths Group continuing their support into the legacy phase, along with new partners Bayer and Syngenta Australia.

In December 2015, the National Farmers Federation launched a new program to use digital technology to improve agricultural efficiency. The program comprises three components:

- An online platform that will provide "a single source for ... food and agribusiness news ... weather and market information, blogs, commentary" as well as "a stronger more unified public voice", scheduled to be available in May 2016
- The National Farmers' Digital Agriculture Service, an online service for data collation
- Sprout, an incubator program to identify and support new ideas in agribusiness developed in partnership with financial services group Findex

== NFF membership ==
NFF policy is set by the NFF Members' Council, which comprises the presidents of the (as of 2026) NFF's 33–member organisations

NFF's members are the state-level farmers' organisations, national commodity councils, and other affiliated members. According to the NFF charter, state-level farmers' organisations represent the interests of the agricultural sector in their respective states. Issues related to individual commodities or interstate/national farming concerns are represented by relevant national commodity councils. The NFF focuses on those policy issues that affect all farmers, regardless of location or commodity. These include such issues as farm business and productivity, access to markets, natural resource management, biosecurity, animal health and welfare, education and training, and workplace relations.

In 2026 the NFF's 33–member organisations were:

- AgForce Queensland
- Australian Chicken Growers' Council
- Australian Dairy Farmers
- Australian Forest Products Association
- Australian Livestock Exporters' Council
- Australian Livestock and Property Agents Association
- Australian Organic
- Australian Veterinary Association
- Australian Wild Game Industry Council
- Beechworth Honey
- CANEGROWERS
- Cattle Australia
- Cotton Australia
- Farmers for Climate Action
- Goat Industry Council of Australia
- GrainGrowers
- NFF Horticulture Council
- NRM Regions Australia
- NSW Farmers
- NSW Irrigators' Council
- Northern Territory Cattlemen's Association
- Pastoralists' Association of West Darling
- Primary Employers Tasmania
- Primary Producers SA
- Queensland Farmers Federation
- Ricegrowers' Association of Australia
- Seafood Industry Australia
- Sheep Producers Australia
- Soils for Life
- Tasmanian Farmers and Graziers Association
- Victorian Farmers Federation
- WAFarmers
- WoolProducers Australia

== Office bearers ==
=== President ===
The following people have been president of the National Farmers' Federation:

Name	Term start	Term end	Term of office
Sir Donald Eckersley OBE	1979	1981	1–2 years
Michael Davidson OBE	1981	1984	2–3 years
Hon. Ian McLachlan AO	1984	1988	3–4 years
John Allwright AO	1988	1991	2–3 years
Graham Blight	1991	1994	2–3 years
Donald McGauchie AO	1994	1998	3–4 years
Ian Donges	1998	2002	3–4 years
Peter Corish	2002	2006	3–4 years
David Crombie	2006	2010	3–4 years
Jock Laurie	2010	2013	2–3 years
Duncan Fraser	April 2013	November 2013	0 years
Brent Finlay	2013	2016	3 years
Fiona Simson	2016	2023	7 years (first female president)
David Jochinke	2023	2025	2 Years
Hamish McIntyre	2025		Current

=== Chief executive officer ===
The following people have been chief executive officer, or another appropriate title, of the National Farmers' Federation:

Name	Term start	Term end	Term of office	Title of office
John Whitelaw	1979	1985	5–6 years	Executive director
Andrew Robb AO	1985	1988	2–3 years	Executive director
Rick Farley	1988	1995	6–7 years	Executive director
Wendy Craik	1995	2000	4–5 years	Executive director
Anna Cronin	2000	2005	5–6 years	Executive director/chief executive officer
Ben Fargher	2005	2011	5–6 years	Chief Executive Officer
Matt Linnegar	2011	2014	2–3 years	Chief Executive Officer
Simon Talbot	2014	2016	1–2 years	Chief Executive Officer
Tony Mahar	2016	2024	9–10 years	Chief Executive Officer
Troy Williams	March 2025	July 2025	<1 year	Chief Executive Officer
Su McCluskey	September 2025	March 2026	<1 year	Interim Chief Executive
Mike Guerin	March 2026		Current	Chief Executive Officer

=== Award of Honour ===
The NFF Award of Honour recognises people who have made an important contribution to the NFF and the farming sector. These include:

Name	Year awarded
Bill de Vos AM	1987
Jim Tehan AM	1988
David Partridge	1990
Roy Smith	1993
John Mackenzie	1999
Alick Lascelles	2000
Graham Blight	2002
Hon. Ian McLachlan AO	2004
Geoffrey Crick	2009
John Underwood	2009
Alex Arbuthnot AM	2012

== NFF Congress ==
The NFF has run its National Congress four times, in 2009, 2010, 2012 and 2014. The two first Congresses focused on modern farming, and adapting to the changing agriculture environment. In 2012, the Congress was around understanding, and capitalizing on, the food and fibre boom. The theme for the 2014 Congress was "Producing Our Future".

== Australian Farmers' Fighting Fund ==
The Australian Farmers' Fighting Fund was created in 1985 to provide financial, legal, and professional assistance to farmers. The fund was created out of the Mudgenberri dispute in 1985, funded in part by farmers and in part by non-farming businesses. The AFFF is governed independently of the NFF and is controlled by a board of trustees, three of whom are independent trustees.

== See also ==
- Agriculture in Australia
- Economy of Australia
