= Nostalgic for the Present Tour =

2016–17 concert tour by Sia

- Tour by Sia
- Promotional poster for the tour
- Associated album: This Is Acting
- Start date: 29 September 2016
- End date: 5 December 2017
- Legs: 2
- No. of shows: 23 in North America; 1 in Asia; 3 in Oceania; 27 total

Sia concert chronology
- We Are Born Tour (2011); Nostalgic for the Present Tour (2016–17)

The Nostalgic for the Present Tour was a concert tour by Australian singer Sia. The 23-date North American leg of the tour, which featured opening acts Miguel and AlunaGeorge, began at Seattle, Washington's KeyArena on 29 September 2016 and concluded on 6 November 2016 at the Frank Erwin Center in Austin, Texas. Maddie Ziegler toured with Sia, together with several other onstage dancers, executing Ryan Heffington's choreography on the stage, while Sia sang at the rear of the stage with her face covered by her familiar wig. The tour received positive reviews from critics.

In November and December 2017, Sia conducted the second leg of the tour, her first stadium tour in Australia, accompanied by Ziegler.

== Background ==
Sia toured in North America and Europe in 2010, and in Australia and North America in 2011, to promote her album We Are Born. She then turned to songwriting, retiring from performing for several years. In 2014, she released the album 1000 Forms of Fear, which, together with its singles and videos like "Chandelier" that featured Maddie Ziegler, achieved considerable success, gaining Sia wider public notice. When Sia performed at various award ceremonies, television shows and other events to promote the album, she wore a wig covering part of her face in an effort to retain some privacy and control over her image.

In April 2016, after Sia released her seventh album, This Is Acting, she performed a live concert for the first time in five years at the Coachella Valley Music and Arts Festival. The concert featured projected videos above the stage with choreographed vignettes, including several that featured Ziegler, while Sia's small dance troupe duplicated the videos' choreography onstage. The performance was widely praised. In June 2016, Sia gave a similar concert at Red Rocks Amphitheatre in Colorado, featuring Ziegler.

The North American leg of the tour was announced on 16 May 2016. From May to August, Sia performed nearly a dozen festival and other concerts in America and European and Middle Eastern countries, establishing the format that she would use on the Nostalgic for the Present Tour, with her dance troupe and video projections, while wearing her "huge white bow hat over a black and white wig covering her face." Ryan Heffington, the choreographer for both the stage performances and the recorded tour visuals, first met Sia in 2013. Their collaborations, beginning with the "Chandelier" video in 2014, for which he won a VMA Award, have "done more to raise the standards of dance in pop music than nearly any current artist integrating the forms." For the North American part of the tour, Sia partnered with rescue organizations to conduct a dog adoption fair at each of her concerts.

In November and December 2017 Sia concluded the second leg of the tour, a stadium mini-tour in Australasia. With these dates, she became the third female soloist to play Australian stadiums in the past quarter century, after Taylor Swift (2013's Red Tour and 2015's 1989 Tour) and Madonna (1993's Girlie Show Tour). Ziegler also accompanied Sia for this run of shows.

A concert performance film made of the tour was released in theatres in 2026, featuring Ziegler's dancing.

== Concert synopsis ==
The concerts in the first leg of the tour opened with AlunaGeorge, followed by Miguel, backed by video screens and "playing a guitar which he eventually ditched to pull off some fluid dance moves, even some knee sliding, during his solid 50-minute set." Eight of the sixteen songs are from Sia's 2016 album This Is Acting (including "The Greatest", which is on the Deluxe version of the album). Four are from her 2014 album 1000 Forms of Fear, while the others are from earlier albums, covers of songs she wrote for other artists, and songs she was featured in.

Sia began her 75-minute set at the center of the stage, which was otherwise empty except for a white square in the middle. She dressed all in white, wearing her signature black and blonde wig that covers the upper half of her face, topped by a giant white bow, and her signature bold red lipstick. Her giant ruffled skirt was revealed to be a huddled group of dancers from whom Ziegler emerged to dance during the first number, "Alive". Sia then moved to a rear corner of the stage for the rest of her set and did not speak, except for acknowledging applause. There were giant video screens on each side of the stage displaying a prerecorded, choreographed vignette for each song that was closely duplicated by the dancer(s) on stage. The videos included cameos by comic Tig Notaro in the song "Diamonds" and actors Paul Dano in "Bird Set Free", Kristen Wiig in "One Million Bullets", Gaby Hoffmann in "Unstoppable" and Ben Mendelsohn in "Breathe Me", each "paired with the dancers onstage to create memorable pieces of performance art."

== Critical reception ==
Critical reaction to the first leg of the tour began with mostly positive reviews and became generally more enthusiastic as the tour progressed. Reviewing the opening night of the tour, Owen R. Smith wrote for The Seattle Times:

Sia used songs from her 2016 hit album This Is Acting to craft powerful visual vignettes. It was the rare arena concert that had a real sense of tension and mystery to it. ... [Sia relegated] herself to the far side of the white performance space ... it was an odd but not unexpected arrangement that put the focus squarely on the visual aspect of the show. Since there was sadly no live band and Sia herself did little besides sing note-perfect if somewhat rote versions of her songs, it wasn’t out of the question to wonder what we needed her for, anyway. After all, there was a magnetic visual assault to focus on, led by 14-year-old dancer Maddie Ziegler, who has starred in five of Sia's music videos since 2014. ... Most of the time, the dancing perfectly complemented the music and asked you to pay attention in different ways than most shows do. ... But Sia was such a passive presence, when things weren’t quite as visually interesting, there wasn’t much else to draw you in.

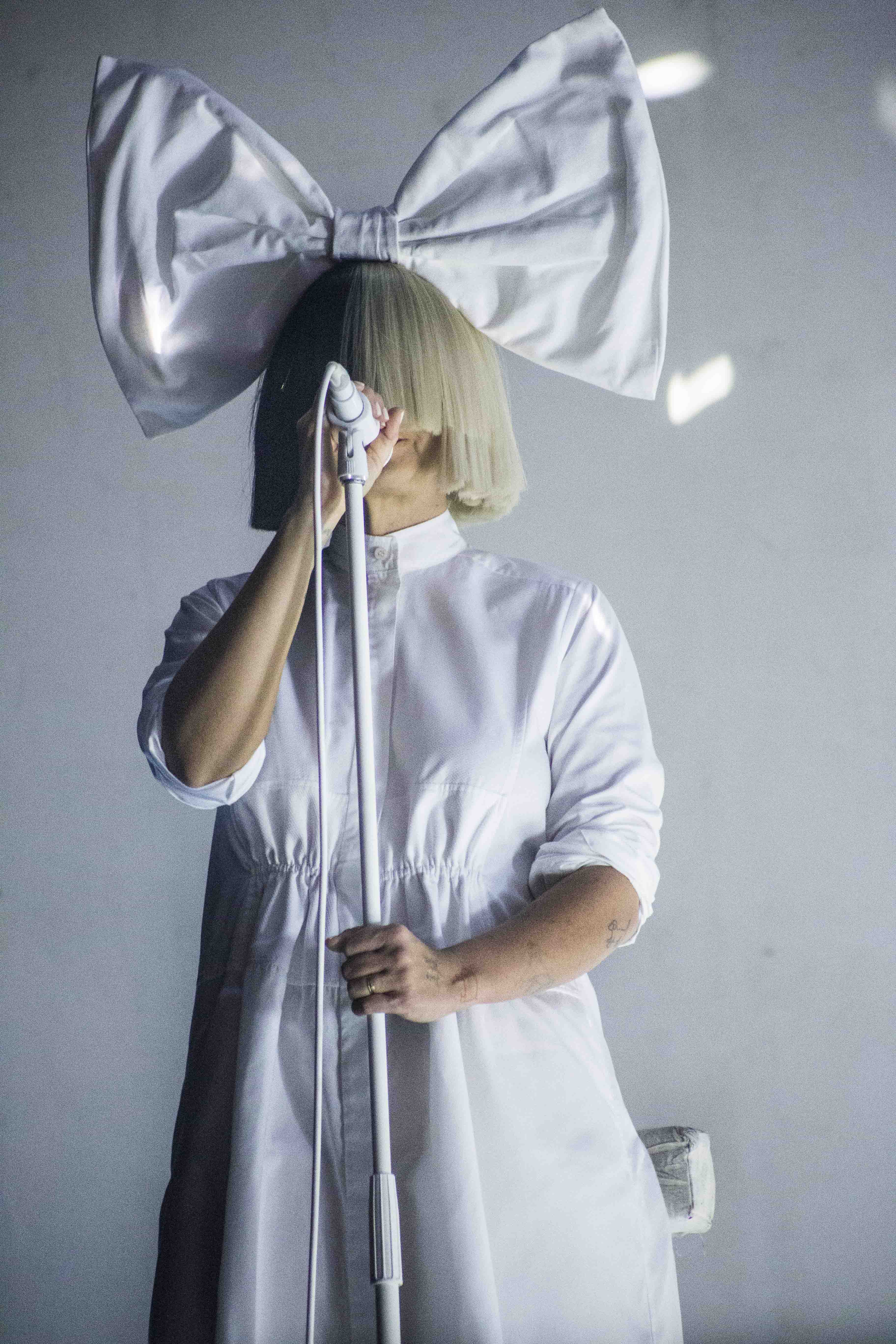
Sia in 2016

For The Mercury News, Jim Harrington commented: "She let her dancers own center stage, carrying out one skit/performance after another as Sia delivered the soundtrack. ... It defied all the regular rules of pop concerts, which are usually designed to focus every ounce of the audience's attention on the star of the show. Yet, Sia's bold gamble paid off, resulting in one of the most daringly original and wholly satisfying shows of 2016." Azucena Rasilla for KRON-TV noted: "The magnificent theatrical production had concert-goers in awe with just how beautiful, though rather short (roughly an hour and fifteen minutes,) and visually delightful the concert was. ... [Sia's] powerful vocals transported us to a magical musical realm." Ed Masley of The Arizona Republic described the show as "part performance art, part interpretive dance. ... [Sia] sounded amazing. ... There's so much raw emotion in her songs. And you can definitely hear that in her voice, but it becomes more visceral when you can also read it in the faces of her dancers, especially Ziegler. ... The entire performance was brilliantly staged, with one song flowing seamlessly into another".

Leslie Ventura wrote for Las Vegas Weekly: "Sia engaged us in a conversation on the human condition ... through intense visuals, song and dance. ... [H]er immaculately produced and evocative show ... [commented] on a wide range of situations and emotions – depression, panic, exhaustion, heartache, innocence and strength. ... Ziegler ... danced furiously alongside the singer, adding dimension and weight to the dramatic vocals." According to Josh Klein of the Chicago Tribune, Sia was "a bundle of fascinating, frustrating contradictions." She performed her deeply personal songs "with palpable passion, but ... delegated the real emoting to Ziegler and her other dancers. ... Sia pushed her powerful voice to its limits, but what was really going on behind her veil of hair remained inscrutable", adding "a barrier between singer and audience". Gary Graff, in Michigan's Daily Tribune, felt that although the concert was "daring and different", it was really designed for a more intimate theatre, rather than an arena. He also noted: "The live dancers were synced so well with their filmed counterparts that it occasionally took a minute to ascertain that what was on the stage was indeed NOT the same as the screen."

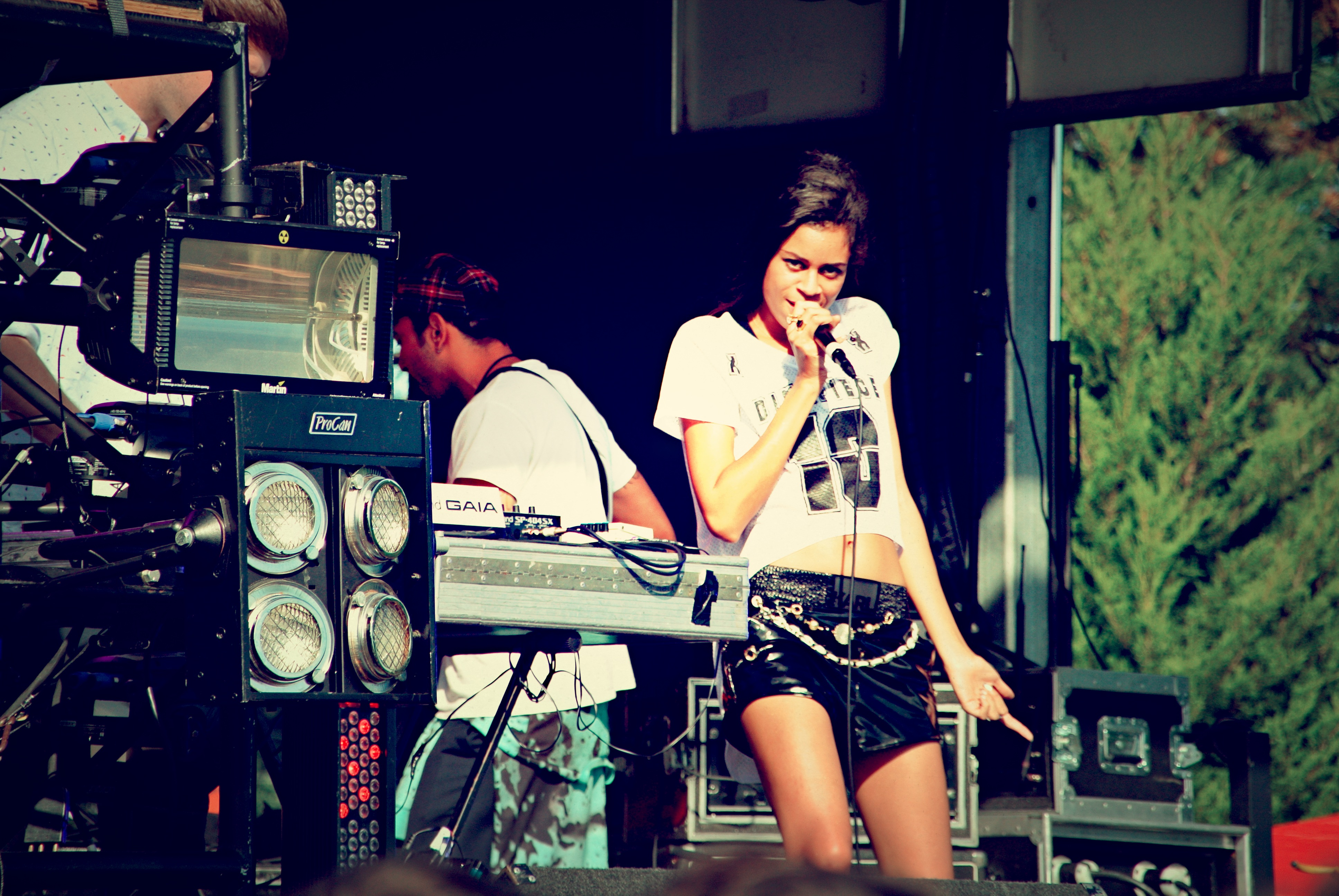
AlunaGeorge, 2013

Of the opening acts, Masley noted: "The show also featured two powerful openers – AlunaGeorge and a very funky Miguel". Lindsay Sanchez of CBS Local Media's Radio.com thought that AlunaGeorge had "star power". She commented: "AlunaGeorge's island electro dance jams ... vibrated through the arena. ... She has a kind of bada– stage presence that works on a stage of any size". Robson wrote: "Miguel, is a brazenly sensual and sexy showman of mixed race parentage who favors a robust mix of nasty funk and powerhouse rock." Klein called Miguel "a magnetic performer and total extrovert. In other words, he was Sia's exact opposite. Yet for all Miguel's energy and charisma, too many meandering detours (including a respectable appeal to vote) kept the set from achieving much momentum."

Later in the tour, Greg Bouchard wrote of the Toronto concert in Exclaim!: "At the massive, packed ACC, Sia did something she unjustly has a reputation for not doing – she connected with the audience, and somehow managed to give an intimate performance in an arena." Jason Lipshutz of Billboard noted that Sia's show drew a "frenzied response" from the New York crowd, commenting:

There was no stage banter, false movements or deviations from the well-worn setlist ... each pre-planned detail is breathtaking. ... Ziegler's presence adds a mischievous energy, as if replicated movements can't capture the heart behind those wide eyes and deranged smiles. [Sia's] lack of movement ... underlines the force of her vocal strength through isolation. ... This year has featured some huge pop spectacles ... but none as creatively captivating as what Sia is doing onstage".

At the last concert of the first leg of the tour, Alejandra Ramirez of The Austin Chronicle judged that Sia's performances was "one of the most innovative" at the Frank Erwin Center, and that her lack of movement and avoidance of the usual "pop-glitz vanity show ... magnified her sheer vocal power, ricocheting from gasping-for-air croons on 'Elastic Heart', soaring rasped shrieks in 'Chandelier', and slip-sliding cadences for 'The Greatest'. ... [S]he's running circles around a sexist, ageist industry. Sia's crushing the cookie-cutter stereotypes of what a pop star should be."

== Set list ==
The following set list is obtained from the Oakland concert on 1 October 2016.

1. "Alive"
2. "Diamonds"
3. "Reaper"
4. "Big Girls Cry"
5. "Bird Set Free"
6. "One Million Bullets"
7. "Cheap Thrills"
8. "Soon We'll Be Found"
9. "Fire Meet Gasoline"
10. "Elastic Heart"
11. "Unstoppable"
12. "Breathe Me"
13. "Move Your Body"
14. "Titanium"
15. "Chandelier"

Encore

16. "The Greatest"

== Shows ==
List of concerts
Date	City	Country	Venue	Opening acts	Attendance	Gross revenue
29 September 2016	Seattle	United States	KeyArena	Miguel; AlunaGeorge	—N/a	—N/a
1 October 2016	Oakland	United States	Oracle Arena	Miguel; AlunaGeorge	—N/a	—N/a
4 October 2016	Phoenix	United States	Talking Stick Resort Arena	Miguel; AlunaGeorge	—N/a	—N/a
5 October 2016	San Diego	United States	Viejas Arena	Miguel; AlunaGeorge	—N/a	—N/a
7 October 2016	Paradise (Note: Billed as Las Vegas.)	United States	Mandalay Bay Events Center	Miguel; AlunaGeorge	6,748 / 8,357	$473,857
8 October 2016	Los Angeles	United States	Hollywood Bowl	Miguel; AlunaGeorge	33,384 / 33,384	$2,688,735
9 October 2016	Los Angeles	United States	Hollywood Bowl	Miguel; AlunaGeorge	33,384 / 33,384	$2,688,735
13 October 2016	Minneapolis	United States	Target Center	Miguel; AlunaGeorge	7,889 / 9,694	$596,047
15 October 2016	Auburn Hills	United States	The Palace of Auburn Hills	Miguel; AlunaGeorge	—N/a	—N/a
16 October 2016	Chicago	United States	United Center	Miguel; AlunaGeorge	—N/a	—N/a
18 October 2016	Boston	United States	TD Garden	Miguel; AlunaGeorge	—N/a	—N/a
19 October 2016	Washington, D.C.	United States	Verizon Center	Miguel; AlunaGeorge	9,919 / 14,196	$897,506
21 October 2016	Philadelphia	United States	Wells Fargo Center	Miguel; AlunaGeorge	11,131 / 13,530	$749,417
22 October 2016	Toronto	Canada	Air Canada Centre	Miguel	13,141 / 13,141	$967,973
23 October 2016	Montreal	Canada	Bell Centre	Miguel	13,352 / 13,352	$810,037
25 October 2016	Brooklyn	United States	Barclays Center	Miguel; AlunaGeorge	12,134 / 12,134	$1,278,262
26 October 2016	Uncasville	United States	Mohegan Sun Arena	Miguel; AlunaGeorge	5,449 / 6,270	$498,575
29 October 2016	Sunrise	United States	BB&T Center	Miguel; AlunaGeorge	—N/a	—N/a
30 October 2016	Orlando	United States	Amway Center	Miguel; AlunaGeorge	8,432 / 11,696	$678,427
1 November 2016	Atlanta	United States	Philips Arena	Miguel; AlunaGeorge	—N/a	—N/a
3 November 2016	New Orleans	United States	Smoothie King Center	Miguel; AlunaGeorge	—N/a	—N/a
4 November 2016	Houston	United States	Toyota Center	Miguel; AlunaGeorge	8,220 / 9,244	$676,640
6 November 2016	Austin	United States	Frank Erwin Center	Miguel; AlunaGeorge	8,578 / 10,541	$720,855
25 March 2017 (Note: Part of Dubai World Cup)	Dubai	United Arab Emirates	Meydan Racecourse	—N/a	—N/a	—N/a
30 November 2017	Melbourne	Australia	AAMI Park	Charli XCX; MØ; Amy Shark	25,704 / 25,919	$2,681,830
2 December 2017	Sydney	Australia	Allianz Stadium	Charli XCX; MØ; Amy Shark	32,230 / 32,931	$2,849,380
5 December 2017	Auckland	New Zealand	Mount Smart Stadium	Charli XCX; MØ; Theia	—N/a	—N/a
Total					196,311 / 214,389 (91.6%)	$16,567,541
