= Daniel Askill =

Australian filmmaker and artist

Daniel Askill (born 1977) is an Australian filmmaker and artist who uses film, photographs, video installation and sculpture in his work. He has directed short films, music videos, commercials and fashion films. He is currently based between Sydney and New York.

== Early life and work ==
Askill was born in Sydney in 1977. He has two brothers: Lorin Askill (a director, editor, photographer and artist) and Jordan Askill (a jewelry designer). He initially studied visual communication at the University of Technology Sydney in 1997 before moving to London, studying at the Central Saint Martins College of Art and Design in 1999.

Working freelance in London, he was involved in design work and film direction. Also during his time in London, he engaged in visual design work for Alexander McQueen.

In 2001, Askill returned to Sydney and founded multimedia production and design studio Collider with his colleagues Andrew van der Westhuyzen and Sam Zalaiskalns. The studio has since expanded and presently has a large roster of staff and directors.

In addition to his background in film and video, Askill also has a background in music composition and performance. He also recorded an album with shakuhachi player Riley Lee when he was 19. With Collider, Askill directed short films, fashion films and commercials for companies including Sony, Dior Homme and Xbox.

== We Have Decided Not To Die ==
In 2003, Askill wrote and directed the critically acclaimed, surreal short film We Have Decided Not To Die. Exhibited in various international film festivals, the film won prizes at the Clermont-Ferrand festival in France, Melbourne International in Australia, Brooklyn International and South by Southwest in the United States. The work is notable for its portrayal of the human body, ritual and use of visceral special effects. It was described by film critic Susan Shineberg in the Sydney Morning Herald as "a breathtaking, burnished triptych, it evokes a surreal, ritualistic world whose characters appear to float free of space and time".

== Works ==
Along with his video art he has also directed numerous music videos for artists such as Sia, These New Puritans and Phoenix. He directed Phoenix's Rally (2007) and Consolation Prizes (2006)

Askill was also commissioned to make films for fashion companies like Ksubi, Another Magazine, Dior and Acne.

In 2009, Askill collaborated with the Sydney Dance Company in its creative work We Unfold. Askill was commissioned to provide video art to screen alongside the work which was exhibited at the Venice Biennale in 2010.

Askill's most recent, solo exhibitions Modern Worship (2011) and Three Rituals (2011) have been exhibited in Los Angeles and Sydney. The works are described as "a meditation on the notion of ritual and how it can be viewed through the eyes of modern culture" and use video installation, photography and sculpture. At the ARIA Music Awards of 2014 he won Best Video, co-directing with Sia Furler, on her music video, "Chandelier" (March 2014).

== List of works ==
=== Film ===
- We Have Decided Not to Die (2003)
- Take Flight - The New York Times (2015)
- Universal Machine (2019)

=== Artistic works ===
- Modern Worship (2011)
- Slow Work on a Bright Screen (2010)
- Triptych and Transforming (2010)
- Artefacts from The Fifth Ritual (2009)
- We Unfold (2009)
- Suspending Disbelief (2008)
- Angel (2007)

=== Music videos ===
- David Guetta and Sia – Beautiful People (2025)
- Flume feat. Caroline Polachek – Sirens (2022)
- Lady Gaga – Stupid Love (2020)
- Sia – Rainbow (2017)
- Sia – The Greatest (2016)
- Sia – Cheap Thrills (Performance Edit) (2016)
- Sia – Alive (2016)
- Sia – Big Girls Cry (2015)
- Sia – Elastic Heart (2015)
- Sia – Chandelier (2014)
- These New Puritans – Fragment Two (2013)
- WIM – See You Hurry (2011)
- These New Puritans – We Want War (2009)
- Digitalism – Pogo (2007)
- Phoenix – Rally (2007)
- Placebo – Follow the Cops (2006)
- Phoenix – Consolation Prizes (2006)
- Unkle feat. Ian Brown – Reign (2005)
- Sia – Breathe Me (2004)

=== Commercials ===
Askill has also directed a number of commercials for companies including, Sony, BMW, Dior Homme, and Xbox.

- Sony – New York City Ballet
- Smirnoff – Purity
- BMW – Climate Control
- History Channel – Hero
- Xbox – Faces
- Dior Homme – Jude Law
- Cadillac – Roll
- Airfrance – Swimming Pool
- Lexus – Merge
- Hummer – Chairs
- Panasonic – Olympic Art

== Selected exhibitions and screenings ==
- Prism, Los Angeles – Three Rituals – 2011
- Gallery A.S, Sydney – Modern Worship – 2011
- Nam June Paik Art Center, Seoul, Korea- Souvenirs from Earth – 2011
- Venice Biennale, Venice, Italy – We Unfold – 2010
- World Expo, Shanghai, China – We Unfold – 2010
- ASVOFF Centre Pompidou, Paris, France- Nocturna – 2010
- RAFW, Sydney- Suspending Disbelief – 2009
- Monster Children Gallery, Sydney- Artefacts From The Fifth Ritual – 2009
- Palais de Tokyo, Paris – France Artcurial for Amnesty International – 2008
- Werkleitz Biennale, Halle, Germany – Happy Believers – 2006 (group)
- Institute of Contemporary Art, London, UK – onedotzero – 2004
- ARTSPACE, Sydney, Australia – We Have Decided Not To Die – 2003
