= Mahiro =

Japanese unisex given name

- Gender: Unisex (usually female)
- Language: Japanese

Origin
- Origin: Japan
- Meaning: Different meanings depending on the kanji used

Other names
- Variant forms: Female: 151; Male: 117
- Nicknames: Ma-chan(まーちゃん); Hirochan(ひろちゃん); Mahiron(まひろん)
- Related names: Mashiro

Mahiro (まひろ) is a unisex Japanese given name.

== Meaning ==
When used as a name, the Kana writing まひろ is the standard reading of Mahiro. While this name is usually applied to females, it has also been used as a unisex. The phonetic is written the same for both sexes and has no inherent meaning. For other kanji variant forms the first sound in Mahiro is "Ma". Sounds starting with "Ma" often have meanings that evoke kindness and tolerance. Mahiro can be written in dozens of different ways that individually exceed 100 for both sexes. Unique readings which are probable guesses are then split off from the larger group. For example, as a boy's name Mahiro has an extended list from one source that includes at least 117 syllabaries of which 12 are unique.

== People ==
- Mahiro Ano (阿野 真拓; born 2003), Japanese footballer currently playing as a midfielder
- Mahiro Hayashida, (林田 真尋) Japanese former idol of the group Fairies (Japanese group)
- Mahiro Kawamura (川村 真洋; born 1995), Japanese former idol of the group Nogizaka46
- Mahiro Kiryu, Japanese wrestler of the group Tokyo Joshi Pro-Wrestling
- Mahiro Maeda (前田 真宏; born 1963), Japanese anime director
- Mahiro Takahashi (高橋 真広; born 2001), Japanese footballer
- Mahiro Takano (高野 万優; born 2006), Japanese karate practitioner
- Mahiro Takasugi (高杉 真宙; born 1996), Japanese actor
- Mahiro Yoshinaga (吉長 真優; born 2002), Japanese footballer

== Fictional characters ==
- Mahiro Fuwa (不破 真広), protagonist of the manga series Zetsuen no Tempest
- Mahiro Yasaka (八坂 真尋), protagonist of the light novel series Haiyore! Nyaruko-san
- Mahiro Oyama (緒山 真尋; aka "緒山 まひろ"), protagonist of the manga series Onimai
