= Free Me (Sia song) =

Single by Sia
- Released: 9 June 2017
- Length: 4:46
- Label: Monkey Puzzle
- Songwriters: Sia Furler; Lucian Piane; Oliver Kraus
- Producer: Oliver Kraus

Sia singles chronology
| "Reaper" (2017) | "Free Me" (2017) | "Dusk Till Dawn" (2017) |

Music video
- "Free Me" on YouTube

"Free Me" is a song by Sia, released on 9 June 2017. Proceeds from the song support efforts to eliminate HIV/AIDS.

== Composition ==
"Free Me" is a piano-led ballad laden with orchestral compositions. It was written by Sia, Oliver Kraus, and Lucian Piane in the key of E-flat major.

== Music video ==
The music video for "Free Me", directed by Blake Martin, was released alongside the song on 9 June 2017. Zoe Saldaña plays an expectant mother who goes for a check-up only to find out that she is HIV-positive. In a voiceover provided by Julianne Moore, we find out that Saldana could pass the disease on to her unborn child if she goes untreated. The five-minute clip follows the mum-to-be's journey from learning of her health status to building her emotional strength–as illustrated by a heartfelt dance sequence choreographed by Ryan Heffington–and giving birth to a healthy baby.

=== Credits ===
Music video credits adapted from YouTube.

- Blake Martin – director
- Kimberly Stuckwisch – producer
- Ian Blair – producer, executive producer
- Diktator – production company
- Ryan Heffington – choreographer
- Marshall Rose – director of photography
- Javier Ameijeiras – production designer
- Josh Strickland – art director
- Madia Hill Scott – production supervisor
- Kelli Kay – assistant production supervisor
- Chad Nicholson – first assistant director
- Bruno Michaels – second assistant director
- Ari Robbins – steadicam

== Charts ==
| Chart (2017) | Peak position |
|---|---|
| France (SNEP) | 155 |
| New Zealand Heatseekers (RMNZ) | 7 |
