= This Is Acting =

2016 studio album by Sia

- Standard edition cover

Studio album by Sia
- Released: 29 January 2016
- Studios: Echo Studio, Los Angeles, California; Harmony Recording Studios, Los Angeles, California; Hot Closet Studios, Los Angeles, California; Kingslanding Studios, Hamptons, New York City; Magical Thinking Studios, Los Angeles, California; The Rib Cage, Los Angeles, California; Wizard Tone Studios, Adelaide, South Australia
- Genre: Pop
- Length: 46:32
- Labels: Monkey Puzzle; RCA
- Producers: Greg Kurstin; Jesse Shatkin; Kanye West; Jack Antonoff; 88-Keys; Jake Sinclair; T-Minus; Nikhil Seetharam; Chris Braide; Josh Valle; Cameron Deyell; Alan Walker; Oliver Kraus

Sia chronology
1000 Forms of Fear (2014)	This Is Acting (2016)	Everyday Is Christmas (2017)

Alternative cover
- Deluxe edition cover

Singles from This Is Acting
- 1. "Alive" Released: 25 September 2015; 2. "Cheap Thrills" Released: 17 December 2015; 3. "Move Your Body" Released: 6 January 2017; 4. "Reaper" Released: 29 May 2017; 5. "Unstoppable" Released: 18 July 2022

Singles from This Is Acting (Deluxe)
- 1. "The Greatest" Released: 6 September 2016

This Is Acting is the seventh studio album by Australian singer and songwriter Sia. It was released on 29 January 2016 by Inertia, Monkey Puzzle and RCA Records. The album is mostly composed of songs written by Sia for other pop artists that were not included on their albums. Sia described songwriting for others as "play-acting," hence the album title.

"Alive", the album's lead single, was released on 24 September 2015. The second single, "Cheap Thrills", was released on 11 February 2016. It reached the top 5 in a number of markets and marked Sia's first number one on the US Billboard Hot 100. A remix of the track featuring guest vocals from Sean Paul was also released. A deluxe edition of This Is Acting was released on 21 October 2016 featuring seven new tracks, including solo and Kendrick Lamar-assisted versions of the single "The Greatest". The album's fourth single, "Move Your Body", was released on 6 January 2017.

The album received generally positive reviews from music critics, who complimented Sia's vocals and deemed it a concept album. However, some criticized the impersonal and indirect nature of the songs. The album debuted at number one in Australia, and also reached number four on the US Billboard 200, selling 81,000 album equivalent units in its first week—of which 68,000 were from pure album sales, becoming Sia's highest first week sales in the country. To further promote the album, Sia embarked on the accompanying Nostalgic for the Present Tour in September 2016. This Is Acting was nominated for the Grammy Award for Best Pop Vocal Album.

== Background and development ==
This Is Acting is the follow-up to Sia's sixth studio album 1000 Forms of Fear, released in 2014. In December 2014, Sia told Spin that she had "two [more records] completed and ready to go". She revealed details of This Is Acting for the first time in an interview published by NME in February 2015. In the article, she confirmed once again that work on the album was finished and that its content was "more pop" than her previous material. She also revealed that the success of 1000 Forms of Fear, specifically its lead single "Chandelier", encouraged her to continue releasing new material, and said of the album's title: "I'm calling it This Is Acting because they are songs I was writing for other people, so I didn't go in thinking 'this is something I would say'. It's more like play-acting. It's fun." The album's cover art features Sia's face digitally altered. Shortly after Sia's announcement, Out published a list of her "10 Greatest Hits for Other Artists" in anticipation of the album.

== Release and promotion ==
During an online chat with fans in April 2015, Sia revealed that the album would "probably" be released in early 2016, but possibly before the end of 2015.

The Target-exclusive deluxe edition of This Is Acting features a song by the name of "Summer Rain". It is believed that this song was rejected by Christina Aguilera. An alleged track list for Aguilera's eighth studio album was leaked early in 2015, and the fifth track was entitled "Summer Rain", suggesting that she was planning on recording and releasing a song dedicated to her daughter with the same name. Sia is also listed as one of the producers on the record. Now that a song whose title is identical to Aguilera's alleged track name has been realized and placed on Sia's extended album, it is thought to have been planned for Aguilera initially, but declined shortly after.

On 7 November 2015, Sia performed "Alive" and "Bird Set Free" on Saturday Night Live; the episode was hosted by Donald Trump. She performed "Alive" on The Ellen DeGeneres Show and The Voice on 1 December, and again on The X Factor in the United Kingdom on 6 December. She further appeared on The Graham Norton Show on 11 December, where she sang "Alive", and on 27 January 2016, she performed "Cheap Thrills" on The Tonight Show Starring Jimmy Fallon. In February 2016, Sia appeared on The Late Late Show with James Corden, in the Carpool Karaoke segment with Corden.

A deluxe edition of This Is Acting was released on 21 October 2016 featuring seven new tracks, including three brand new tracks: "Confetti", "Midnight Decisions", and "Jesus Wept", as well as the single remix of "Cheap Thrills", the Alan Walker remix of "Move Your Body", and the solo and Kendrick Lamar-assisted versions of "The Greatest".

=== Singles ===
In September 2015, Sia confirmed the album's lead single "Alive" would be released later that month and was originally written for Adele; the English singer and songwriter co-wrote but "rejected" the song at the last minute. The album's release date, 29 January 2016, was confirmed in early November 2015. "Cheap Thrills" was released as the album's second official single on 17 December 2015, and it was originally planned for Rihanna.

"The Greatest" was released as the first single from the deluxe version of the album on 5 September 2016. It features vocals from American rapper Kendrick Lamar. "Move Your Body" was released as the third single from the album on 6 January 2017. The song was originally planned for Shakira. "Reaper" was released in Australia as the fourth single from the album on 29 May 2017.

"Unstoppable" was released as the fifth and final single from the album on 18 July 2022, after gaining traction over the years from usage in commercials and TikTok videos.

=== Promotional singles ===
"Bird Set Free" was released as the first promotional single along with the pre-order of the album on 4 November 2015. The song was originally written for Pitch Perfect 2 but it was rejected in favor of "Flashlight". The song was then pitched to Rihanna. After being rejected, it was then recorded by Adele but did not make the cut for her third studio album, 25.

"One Million Bullets" was released as the second promotional single on 27 November 2015. The song is the only one on the album that was not pitched to another artist.

"Cheap Thrills" was announced as the album's third promotional release and was released on 16 December 2015. The song was one of two tracks rejected by Rihanna who, as Sia described, was a no-show at the recording sessions.

"Reaper" was released as the fourth promotional single on 7 January 2016. The song was written by herself and Kanye West for Rihanna, but Sia decided to keep it.

"Unstoppable" was released as the fifth and final promotional single on 21 January 2016. Jessie Morris of Complex commented that the song sounds like a "page torn right out of Demi Lovato's Confident book", while editors of other media platforms like Idolator noticed this as well, which raised speculation that the track was intentionally written for Lovato.

=== Tour ===
On 16 May 2016, Sia announced her first tour in five years, Nostalgic for the Present Tour, and the tour dates for the North American leg. Miguel and AlunaGeorge were announced as the opening acts for the first leg.

== Critical reception ==
Professional ratings
Aggregate scores
Source	Rating
AnyDecentMusic?	6.4/10
Metacritic	67/100
Review scores
Source	Rating
AllMusic	4/5 stars
The A.V. Club	B+
Billboard	3/5 stars
The Guardian	3/5 stars
Idolator	4/5
The Independent	4/5 stars
NME	4/5 stars
Pitchfork	6.8/10
Rolling Stone	3/5 stars
Slant Magazine	3/5 stars

This Is Acting received generally positive reviews from music critics. The A.V. Club gave the album a favorable review, stating that "There's a clear theme here, and it's emancipation—from fear, from doubt, and most of all, from feeling as though she wasn’t meant to be a star. Gone is the uncertainty that still clung to many of her earlier efforts at mainstream pop hits of her own; success has granted her the confidence to dive into the deep end of the mainstream music pool, and the results are potent."

Jon Pareles from The New York Times gave the album a mixed review, writing "In 'Alive', as she repeats 'I'm still breathing!' in the chorus, she makes her voice break a different way each time she sings it. But Sia's success as a hitmaker has also turned into a pitfall. Even as she and her producers flaunt their layered vocals and whiz-bang sound effects, there are already so many of Sia's midtempo victim-to-victory anthems around that they offer diminishing returns, particularly when listened to as an album."

Kathy Iandoli of Idolator was more positive towards the effort, stating that it "feels like the aftermath of coming to terms with her nagging demons, as Sia maintains brutal honesty cloaked in cinematic, mainstream music — albeit through songs that, as we well know by now, were written for and rejected by other artists." She continues: "Her voice is so bold and beautiful that when she attempts to wedge herself into songs designed for thin voices (check 'Sweet Design'), she sounds like an opera singer in a dancehall." On a more personal aspect, she writes "feels as though Sia's career has been idyllic thus far to everyone but her. She started in the super cool indie world, moved over to mid-level pop majesty, took a break to be a hit songwriter and then slid into near-icon status. But when you live inside your head, none of that really matters, and that's what This Is Acting reveals."

Billboard listed This is Acting among the best albums of the first half of 2016, with an editor writing "While other artists shudder at the thought of being labeled a sellout, Sia celebrated the moniker – and turned it into a concept album."

== Commercial performance ==
This Is Acting debuted atop the ARIA Albums Chart in Australia, and received a gold certification for sales of over 35,000 copies. It debuted at number four on the US Billboard 200 with first-week sales of 81,000 album equivalent units (68,000 in pure album sales), which became Sia's highest sales week in the country. As of 1 January 2017, the album has sold 299,600 copies and 904,000 total equivalent units in the United States.

In its 26th week on Billboard 200, the album vaulted back into the top 10 for the first time since its debut week, as it rose 11–6 with 30,000 units, supported by the success of the second single "Cheap Thrills", which reached the summit of the Billboard Hot 100 at the time.

In its 39th week, it vaulted 18–11 due to the deluxe edition of the album being released, and became the greatest gainer of the week. Also, during this week, the lead single off the deluxe edition, "The Greatest", rose 25–19.

== Track listing ==
Standard edition
No.	Title	Writer(s)	Producer(s)	Length
1.	"Bird Set Free"	Sia Furler; Greg Kurstin	Kurstin	4:12
2.	"Alive"	Furler; Adele Adkins; Tobias Jesso Jr.	Jesse Shatkin	4:23
3.	"One Million Bullets"	Furler; Shatkin	Shatkin	4:12
4.	"Move Your Body"	Furler; Kurstin	Kurstin	4:07
5.	"Unstoppable"	Furler; Chris Braide	Shatkin	3:37
6.	"Cheap Thrills"	Furler; Kurstin	Kurstin	3:31
7.	"Reaper"	Furler; Kanye West; Dom $olo; Noah Goldstein; Charles Misodi Njapa	West; Dom $olo; Goldstein; 88-Keys; Shatkin; Jake Sinclair	3:39
8.	"House on Fire"	Furler; Jack Antonoff	Shatkin; Antonoff; Sinclair^{[a]}	4:01
9.	"Footprints"	Furler; Tyler Williams; Josh Valle; Nikhil Seetharam	T-Minus; Valle^{[a]}; Seetharam^{[a]}; Shatkin^{[a]}	3:13
10.	"Sweet Design"	Furler; Kurstin; Mark Andrews; Desmond Child; Robi Rosa; Tim Kelley; Bob Robinson; Marquis Collins; Joseph Longo	Kurstin	2:25
11.	"Broken Glass"	Furler; Shatkin; Jasper Leak	Shatkin	4:25
12.	"Space Between"	Furler; Braide	Cameron Deyell; Braide^{[b]}	4:47
Total length:				46:32

Japanese edition bonus tracks (Alive Remixes)
No.	Title	Writer(s)	Producer(s)	Length
13.	"Alive" (AFSHeeN Remix)	Furler; Adkins; Jesso Jr.	Shatkin	3:16
14.	"Alive" (Boehm Remix)	Furler; Adkins; Jesso Jr.	Shatkin	3:50
15.	"Alive" (Cahill Remix)	Furler; Adkins; Jesso Jr.	Shatkin	6:20
Total length:				59:58

Spotify reissue bonus track
No.	Title	Writer(s)	Producer(s)	Length
13.	"Cheap Thrills" (featuring Sean Paul)	Furler; Paul; Kurstin	Kurstin	3:44
Total length:				50:16

Google Play reissue bonus track
No.	Title	Writer(s)	Producer(s)	Length
14.	"The Greatest" (featuring Kendrick Lamar)	Furler; Lamar; Kurstin; Blair MacKichan	Kurstin	3:30
Total length:				53:46

Deluxe edition
No.	Title	Writer(s)	Producer(s)	Length
15.	"Confetti"	Furler; Braide	Shatkin	4:06
16.	"Move Your Body" (Alan Walker Remix)	Furler; Kurstin	Kurstin; Walker^{[c]}; Mood Melodies^{[c]}	3:37
17.	"Midnight Decisions"	Furler; Braide	Braide	3:43
18.	"Jesus Wept"	Furler; Samuel Dixon	Oliver Kraus	5:30
19.	"The Greatest"	Furler; Kurstin; MacKichan	Kurstin	3:30
Total length:				74:11

Target bonus tracks
No.	Title	Writer(s)	Producer(s)	Length
13.	"Fist Fighting a Sandstorm"	Furler; Shatkin	Shatkin	3:48
14.	"Summer Rain"	Furler; Shatkin	Shatkin	3:35
Total length:				53:55

Target deluxe edition bonus tracks
No.	Title	Writer(s)	Producer(s)	Length
15.	"Cheap Thrills" (featuring Sean Paul)	Furler; Paul; Kurstin	Kurstin	3:44
16.	"The Greatest" (featuring Kendrick Lamar)	Furler; Lamar; Kurstin; MacKichan	Kurstin	3:30
17.	"Confetti"	Furler; Braide	Shatkin	4:06
18.	"Move Your Body" (Alan Walker Remix)	Furler; Kurstin	Kurstin; Walker^{[c]}; Mood Melodies^{[c]}	3:37
19.	"Midnight Decisions"	Furler; Braide	Braide	3:42
20.	"Jesus Wept"	Furler; Dixon	Kraus	5:29
Total length:				78:00

10th Anniversary edition
No.	Title	Writer(s)	Producer(s)	Length
13.	"Cheap Thrills" (featuring Sean Paul)	Furler; Paul; Kurstin	Kurstin	3:44
14.	"The Greatest" (featuring Kendrick Lamar)	Furler; Lamar; Kurstin; MacKichan	Kurstin	3:30
15.	"Confetti"	Furler; Braide	Shatkin	4:06
16.	"Midnight Decisions"	Furler; Braide	Braide	3:43
17.	"Jesus Wept"	Furler; Dixon	Kraus	5:30
18.	"The Greatest"	Furler; Kurstin; MacKichan	Kurstin	3:30
19.	"Fist Fighting a Sandstorm"	Furler; Shatkin	Shatkin	3:48
20.	"Summer Rain"	Furler; Shatkin	Shatkin	3:35
21.	"Bird Set Free - Live from The Village"	Furler; Kurstin	Kurstin	5:13
22.	"Alive" (Plastic Plates Remix)	Furler; Adkins; Jesso Jr.	Shatkin; Plates^{[c]}	4:58
23.	"Move Your Body" (Alan Walker Remix)	Furler; Kurstin	Kurstin; Walker; Melodies	3:37
24.	"Unstoppable" (R3hab Remix)	Furler; Braide	Shatkin; R3hab^{[c]}	2:42
Total length:				1:34:00

Notes

- ^{^a} signifies an additional producer
- ^{^b} signifies a vocal producer
- ^{^c} signifies a remixer

Sample credits

- "Sweet Design" samples elements of "Thong Song" (1999) performed by Sisqó, written by Mark "Sisqó" Andrews, Tim Kelley, Bob Robinson, Desmond Child and Robi Rosa, "Remind Me" performed by Schiller Street Gang, and "Life Walked Out" performed by The Mist.

== Personnel ==
- Sia – vocals, executive producer, all photos, art direction, design, font creator
- Cameron Deyell – guitar (12), bass guitar (12), keyboards (12)
- Tobias Jesso Jr. – piano (2)
- Greg Kurstin – bass guitar (1, 4, 6, 10), drums (1, 4, 6, 10), keyboards (1, 4, 6, 10), mellotron (1), piano (1), guitar (6, 10)
- Garrett Ray – drums (2)
- Erick Serna – guitar (2, 8–9)
- Jesse Shatkin – bass guitar (2–3, 5, 8, 11), piano (2–3, 5, 7–8), synthesizer (2, 8, 11), guitar (2–3), percussion (2), drums (3, 5, 7–9, 11), keyboards (3, 5, 9)
- Jake Sinclair – percussion (8), tambourine (8), piano (8)
- T-Minus – drums (9), bass (9), piano (9)
- Josh Valle – guitar (9)
- Chris Wrays – keyboards (7), guitar (7)

Production

- 88-Keys – production (7)
- Jack Antonoff – production (8)
- Christopher Braide – vocal production (12), vocals recording (12)
- James Brown – engineering (12)
- Julian Burg – engineering (1, 4, 6, 10), additional engineering (7–9)
- Cameron Deyell – production (12)
- Dom $olo – production (7)
- Noah Goldstein – production (7)
- Greg Kurstin – production (1, 4, 6, 10), engineering (1, 4, 6, 10)
- Alex Pasco – engineering (1, 4, 6, 10)
- Nikhil Seetharam – additional production (9)
- Jesse Shatkin – production (2–3, 5, 7–8, 11), drum programming (2, 7–8, 11), string programming (2, 5, 9), additional programming (2), engineering (2, 5, 7–9, 11), programming (3, 5, 8–9, 11), recording (3), additional vocals recording (6), bass programming (7), synth programming (7), additional production (9), vocal engineering (9)
- Suzy Shinn – additional engineering (7)
- Jake Sinclair – production (7), additional production (8)
- Rob Suchecki – vocal recording (9)
- T-Minus – production (9), programming (9), engineering (9)
- Josh Valle – additional production (9)
- Kanye West – production (7)
- Stuart White – vocal recording (9)
- Jaime Wosk – additional engineering (2, 5, 7–8), vocal engineering (9)
- Jonathan Daniel – management
- Michelle Holme – design
- Bob McLynn – management
- Keith Naftaly – A&R
- Erik Lang – all photos
- David Russell – album production manager, management
- Chloe Weise – A&R

== Charts ==
=== Weekly charts ===
Chart (2016–2017)	Peak position
Australian Albums (ARIA)	1
Australian Dance Albums (ARIA)	1
Austrian Albums (Ö3 Austria)	9
Belgian Albums (Ultratop Flanders)	11
Belgian Albums (Ultratop Wallonia)	4
Canadian Albums (Billboard)	2
Croatian Albums (Toplista)	35
Czech Albums (ČNS IFPI)	3
Danish Albums (Hitlisten)	11
Dutch Albums (Album Top 100)	9
Finnish Albums (Suomen virallinen lista)	3
French Albums (SNEP)	3
German Albums (Offizielle Top 100)	14
Greek Albums (IFPI)	14
Hungarian Albums (MAHASZ)	33
Irish Albums (IRMA)	5
Italian Albums (FIMI)	13
South Korean Albums (Circle)	36
South Korean International Albums (Circle)	2
Japanese Albums (Oricon)	30
Mexican Albums (AMPROFON)	26
New Zealand Albums (RMNZ)	5
Norwegian Albums (VG-lista)	1
Polish Albums (ZPAV)	2
Portuguese Albums (AFP)	13
Scottish Albums (Official Charts)	2
Spanish Albums (Promusicae)	4
Swedish Albums (Sverigetopplistan)	10
Swiss Albums (Schweizer Hitparade)	3
Swiss Albums (Romandy)	1
UK Albums (Official Charts)	3
UK Album Downloads (Official Charts)	2
US Billboard 200	4

=== Monthly charts ===
Chart (2016)	Peak position
Argentine Monthly Albums (CAPIF)	4

=== Year-end charts ===
Chart (2016)	Position
Australian Albums (ARIA)	18
Australian Dance Albums (ARIA)	4
Belgian Albums (Ultratop Flanders)	64
Belgian Albums (Ultratop Wallonia)	27
Canadian Albums (Billboard)	9
Danish Albums (Hitlisten)	18
Dutch Albums (MegaCharts)	61
French Albums (SNEP)	22
German Albums (Offizielle Top 100)	96
Icelandic Albums (Plötutíóindi)	67
Mexican Albums (AMPROFON)	73
New Zealand Albums (RMNZ)	26
Polish Albums (ZPAV)	65
South Korean Albums International (Gaon)	68
Spanish Albums (PROMUSICAE)	46
Swedish Albums (Sverigetopplistan)	27
Swiss Albums (Schweizer Hitparade)	19
UK Albums (OCC)	16
US Billboard 200	22
Chart (2017)	Position
Australian Albums (ARIA)	63
Belgian Albums (Ultratop Flanders)	144
Belgian Albums (Ultratop Wallonia)	134
Canadian Albums (Billboard)	28
Danish Albums (Hitlisten)	48
Dutch Albums (MegaCharts)	72
Italian Albums (FIMI)	74
New Zealand Albums (RMNZ)	47
Polish Albums (ZPAV)	22
Swedish Albums (Sverigetopplistan)	52
UK Albums (OCC)	86
US Billboard 200	82
Chart (2023)	Position
Swedish Albums (Sverigetopplistan)	91

=== Decade-end charts ===
Chart (2010–2019)	Position
US Billboard 200	189

== Certifications and sales ==
Region	Certification	Certified units/sales
Australia (ARIA)	Gold	35,000^{^}
Brazil (Pro-Música Brasil)	3× Platinum	120,000^{‡}
Canada (Music Canada)	2× Platinum	62,043
Denmark (IFPI Danmark)	3× Platinum	60,000^{‡}
France (SNEP)	Platinum	100,000^{‡}
Germany (BVMI)	Platinum	200,000^{‡}
Italy (FIMI)	2× Platinum	100,000^{‡}
Mexico (AMPROFON)	4× Platinum	240,000^{‡}
New Zealand (RMNZ)	3× Platinum	45,000^{‡}
Poland (ZPAV)	Diamond	100,000^{‡}
Switzerland (IFPI Switzerland)	Gold	15,000^{‡}
United Kingdom (BPI)	Platinum	300,000^{‡}
United States (RIAA)	2× Platinum	2,000,000^{‡}
Summaries
Worldwide	—	1,200,000
^{^} Shipments figures based on certification alone.^{‡} Sales+streaming figures based on certification alone.

== Release history ==
Country	Date	Format	Version	Label	Ref.
Worldwide	29 January 2016	CD; digital download	Standard	Inertia; Monkey Puzzle; RCA	
Worldwide	21 October 2016	CD; digital download	Deluxe	Inertia; Monkey Puzzle; RCA	
Worldwide	30 January 2026	2xLP; digital download	10th Anniversary Edition	Inertia; Monkey Puzzle; RCA	

== See also ==
- List of 2016 albums
- List of number-one albums of 2016 (Australia)
- List of number-one albums of 2016 (Norway)
- List of UK top-ten albums in 2016
