= Reaper (song) =

2017 song by Sia

Single by Sia

from the album This Is Acting
- Released: 29 May 2017
- Studio: The Rib Cage (Los Angeles, CA)
- Genre: Pop
- Length: 3:39
- Label: Inertia
- Songwriters: Sia Furler; Kanye West; Noah Goldstein; Charles Misodi Njapa; Dom $olo
- Producers: West; Dom $olo; Goldstein; 88-Keys; Jesse Shatkin; Jake Sinclair

Sia singles chronology
"To Be Human" (2017)	"Reaper" (2017)	"Free Me" (2017)

Audio video
- "Reaper" on YouTube

"Reaper" is a song by Australian singer and songwriter Sia which features on her seventh studio album, This Is Acting (2016). It was released as the fourth promotional single from This Is Acting on 7 January 2016, before being released as an official single, the fourth from the album, in Australia, on 29 May 2017.

The pop song, originally intended for Rihanna's album Anti (2016), was written by Sia, Kanye West, Noah Goldstein, Charles Njapa (better known by his stage name 88-Keys), and Dom $olo, and produced by West, Dom $olo, Goldstein, 88-Keys, Jesse Shatkin, and Jake Sinclair.

== Background and release ==
"Reaper" came about when Sia was writing songs for Rihanna's eighth studio album Anti. Both Rihanna and Kanye West were supposed to be a part of the session with her, but neither turned up, instead telling Sia what they wanted, leaving notes for her. Sia and West had previously collaborated on the latter's song "Wolves". "Reaper" was one of four rejected by Rihanna which ended up on This Is Acting, alongside "Bird Set Free", "Cheap Thrills", and "Space Between". Sia stated in an interview with Rolling Stone that she "thought there was something about the chorus that seemed fun", but "never thought it would see the light of day". Her manager pushed for the song to be featured on the album:

I don't care about the song. I know in print that will look bad, but what I mean is I'm not emotionally attached to it. I thought it was a fun song. I think it's a good, fun song, but I didn't anticipate it being on the record. But my manager really likes it so I put it on for him.

— Sia on "Reaper", Rolling Stone

In January 2016, Sia revealed the track listing for This Is Acting by having theaters around the world display songs and track numbers on their marquees. The songs "Reaper" and "House on Fire" were confirmed as the seventh and eighth tracks, respectively, on the marquee of Webster Hall in Manhattan, New York City, on 6 January. The day after, "Reaper" was released as the fourth promotional single from the album.

Sia performed the song on Good Morning America on the morning of This Is Acting's release. It was eventually released as a single in Australia – the fifth from the album – on 29 May 2017, directly following the announcement of the Australian leg of the Nostalgic for the Present Tour.

== Composition ==
"Reaper" is a pop song about cheating death. The song, featuring Sia's "eccentric art-pop vocals", begins mellow before building into a "dramatic" chorus. At a length of 3 minutes and 38 seconds, it was written by Sia, Kanye West, Noah Goldstein, 88-Keys, and Dom $olo, with the latter four handling production alongside Jesse Shatkin and Jake Sinclair. The song is written in the key of F-sharp major.

== Reception ==
In her review of This Is Acting for Vulture, Lindsay Zoladz named "Reaper" as one of the album's best songs, calling it "a feel-good ode to cheating death". Laurence Day of The Line of Best Fit opined that although the lyrics are "wounded and vulnerable", the song is an "endearingly optimistic track", likening its belying of the "gravity of the subject at hand" to that in Sia's "Chandelier". Writing for The Arts Desk, Katie Colombus described "Reaper" as a "huge life [anthem] that celebrate[s] every breath you are able to take", and Soul Bounce writer B. Cakes called the song "oddly-inspiring" and "jaunty". DIY's El Hunt described it as "simple yet effective". In 2017, staff of Billboard ranked the song as one of the best "deep cuts" by 21st century popstars, describing it as a "rumbling anthem" which "is a welcome dose of 'not today' attitude".

Taking a more critical standpoint, Alex Kritselis of Bustle wrote, "After hearing 'Reaper', [...] it's easy to understand Sia's indifference. It's a catchy tune, sure [but] I'm not at all surprised Rihanna passed on it." Similarly, Cameron Cook of Pitchfork opined that the song "falls a little flat, missing the punch that its intended artist [Rihanna] would have provided".

== Personnel ==
Credits adapted from the liner notes of This Is Acting.

- Sia – songwriting
- Kanye West – songwriting, production
- Noah Goldstein – songwriting, production
- 88-Keys – songwriting, production
- Dom $olo – songwriting, production
- Jesse Shatkin – production, drums, drum programming, bass programming, synth programming, piano, engineering
- Jake Sinclair – production
- Chris Wrays – keyboards, guitar
- Jaime Wosk – additional engineering
- Julian Burg – additional engineering
- Suzy Shinn – additional engineering
- Manny Marroquin – mixing
- Emily Lazar – mastering

== Charts ==
Chart (2016)	Peak position
Australia (ARIA)	89
Canada Hot 100 (Billboard)	78
France (SNEP)	89
Sweden (Sverigetopplistan)	92

== Release history ==
Country	Date	Format	Label	Ref.
Worldwide	7 January 2016	Digital download; streaming	Monkey Puzzle; Inertia; RCA	
Australia	29 May 2017	Contemporary hit radio	Inertia	
