= Jordan Askill =

Australian jeweller

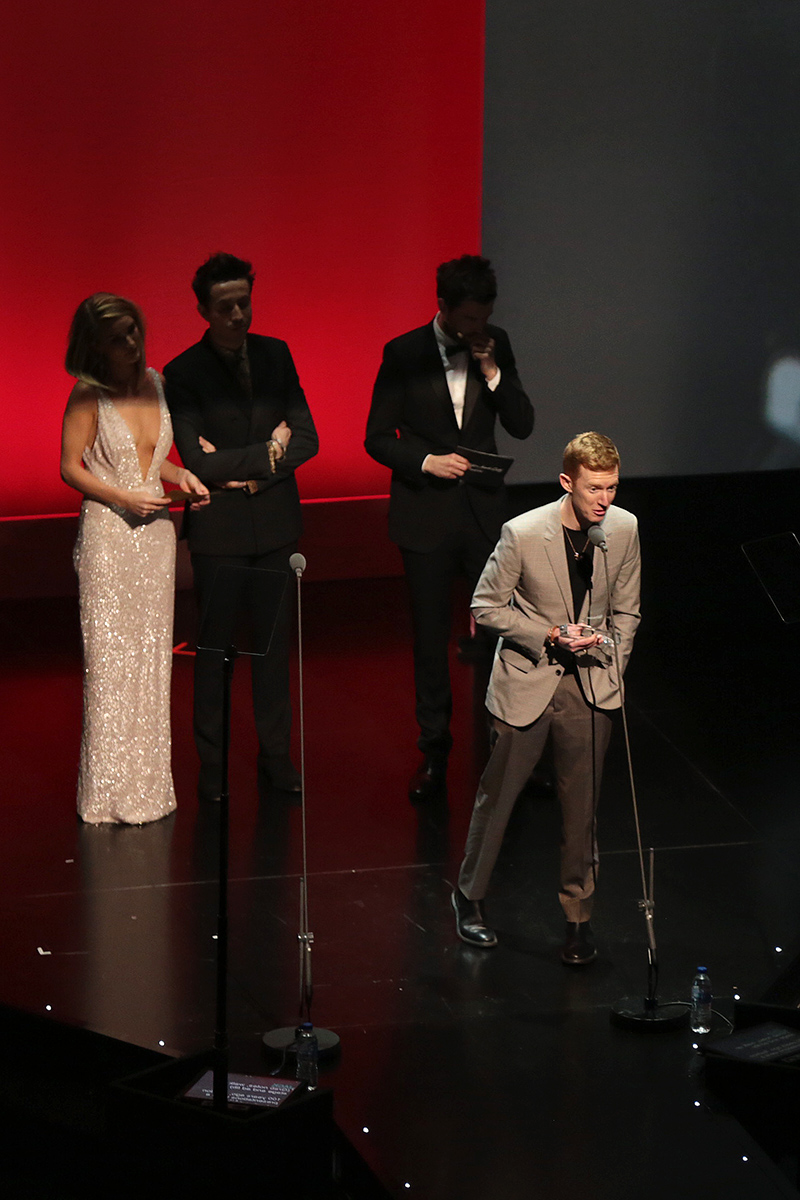
- Born: 17 May; Sydney, Australia
- Education: TAFE NSW – Sydney
- Occupation: Jewelry designer
- Years active: 2011 – present
- Known for: Jordan Askill brand

Jordan Askill is an Australian jewelry designer and sculptor.

== Biography ==
Askill was born in Sydney, Australia and currently works as a jeweller and sculptor. He is the brother of Daniel Askill. He studied at TAFE NSW. After graduating in 2000, he interned with Alexander McQueen in London. Askill became lead designer for Australian brand Ksubi in Sydney. In 2004, he took a job at Dior Homme in Paris, and relocated to London four years later to create his own jewelry brand. In 2015, Askill collaborated with Danish brand Georg Jensen, its first jewelry collaboration with a contemporary designer in 15 years. Also in 2015, he won a British Fashion Award for Emerging Accessory Design, the first time in 5 years that this category had been won by a jewelry designer. His work has also been exhibited at the Museum of London as part of an exhibition showcasing the work of contemporary jewelers based in London.

His jewelry and works have been featured in major media such as GQ, People, Elle, The Guardian and Vogue.

== Awards ==
- 2012: British Fashion Council: Rock Vault
- 2012: Elle Style Awards Best Jewellery Designer
- 2015: British Fashion Award for Emerging Accessory Design
- 2017: CFDA / Vogue Fashion Fund finalist
