= The Greatest (Sia song) =

2016 single by Sia

- Single cover, featuring Maddie Ziegler

Single by Sia featuring Kendrick Lamar

from the album This Is Acting (Deluxe)
- Released: 22 January 2016
- Studio: Echo Studios (Los Angeles, CA)
- Genre: Electropop
- Length: 3:30
- Label: Monkey Puzzle; RCA
- Songwriters: Sia Furler; Greg Kurstin; Kendrick Duckworth; Blair MacKichan
- Producer: Greg Kurstin

Sia singles chronology
"Je te pardonne" (2016)	"The Greatest" (2016)	"Never Give Up" (2016)

Kendrick Lamar singles chronology
"Holy Key" (2016)	"The Greatest" (2016)	"Freedom" (2016)

Music video
- "The Greatest" on YouTube

Audio video
- "The Greatest (feat. Kendrick Lamar)" on YouTube

"The Greatest" is a song recorded by Australian singer and songwriter Sia for the deluxe edition of her seventh studio album, This Is Acting (2016). Being made available for digital download as the lead single of the album's deluxe edition on 6 September 2016 through Monkey Puzzle and RCA Records, the single version of "The Greatest" features a verse from American rapper Kendrick Lamar. The electropop song was written by Sia, Greg Kurstin, Blair MacKichan and Lamar, with production handled by Kurstin. The solo version was written by the former three only.

An accompanying music video for the single was filmed by Sia and Daniel Askill, and features American dancer Maddie Ziegler surrounded by 48 different young people. Although the singer has not provided an interpretation of the video's plot, numerous media outlets have perceived it as a tribute to the 49 victims of the Orlando nightclub shooting. Commercially, "The Greatest" reached the top five in several countries and was awarded with certifications in different territories. The music video was nominated for a 2017 MTV Video Music Award for Best Choreography.

== Composition ==
Billboard editor Gil Kaufman described "The Greatest" as an "uplifting, poppy song with a subtle island vibe."

The song is written in the key of C minor with a cut common time tempo of 96 beats per minute. The vocals span from B♭_{3} to E♭_{5} in the song.

== Critical reception ==
The Greatest was highly praised by music critics and its commemoration too. Jessica Goodman from Entertainment Weekly explained the chorus "massive and catchy." Once the critics had picked up on the song's connection with the Orlando nightclub shooting, Spencer Kornhaber of The Atlantic wrote:

Making pop about a specific tragedy is necessarily a tricky job. So it's no crime that some of the other mainstream original songs memorializing Orlando have been as rote as issue-oriented singles are often stereotyped as being. ... But "The Greatest" is very potent, a work of art, not charity. ... There's no break here from the rest of Sia's catalog about pain and release in everyday life: You hear a sad voice wailing about bucking up, very stark emotional peaks and valleys, and a danceable backing of explosive drums, toy-box melodies, and reggae grooves. Sia and Greg Kurstin may have written the song even before the massacre. But in the context of Orlando, the possible platitude of the chorus becomes gutting: "I'm free to be the greatest / I'm alive." She's pepping the listener up, but she's also defining the value of life, marking the human potential that's been lost.

The Orlando shooting commemoration was also praised by Bruno Russell from The Edge, who called the song's concept "inspirational" as "the message is clear: that we can make a difference and be 'The Greatest,' but we have to act now." Russell awarded a 5-star review for the song, praising her performance as having "somewhat of a narrative feel, especially from the childish nature of the instrumental backing, which emphasizes the vulnerability there to be exposed and challenged (though, at the same time, there is also a power within this from the more powerful chorus)." Russell also praised Lamar's rap in the single release of the track.

== Chart performance ==
Upon the song's release, "The Greatest" debuted on several charts worldwide, including the US Billboard Hot 100 at number 52, UK Singles Chart at 49, and Australian Singles Chart at number 25, and achieved top ten debuts in France, New Zealand, Scotland, Finland, Norway, Hungary, Spain, and Sweden. In its second week on the UK Singles Chart, the song climbed to number 5, making it Sia's ninth top ten single on that chart, and Kendrick's second. It later rose to number 2 in Australia, number 1 in Switzerland, and number 18 in the US. In its fourth week on the singles chart, "The Greatest" was certified gold in both Australia and Canada.

== Music video ==
The music video was directed by Sia and Daniel Askill and choreographed by Ryan Heffington. The director of photography was Mathieu Plainfosse. It was released on 5 September 2016 and has been viewed on YouTube more than 790 million times as of August 2023.

Writers from several media outlets, including E! Online, Cosmopolitan, Variety, People magazine, concluded that the video was a tribute to the victims of the Orlando nightclub shooting. The video opens with a low drone and cuts between shots of an upset Maddie Ziegler painting rainbow colours on her cheeks. She frees 48 other young spirits trapped in a cage (49 being the number of people killed in the shooting); their freedom is short-lived, however. Later, a wall is seen filled with bullet holes as everyone falls to the ground, and tears stream down Ziegler's face. Kornhaber wrote:

Absent of any social context, it's all striking and beautiful and ineffably sad. With the knowledge that it was inspired by queer youths and friends gunned down in the act of coming together and enjoying themselves, it becomes almost unbearably poignant. Sia keeps singing about having stamina; Kendrick Lamar's verse, omitted from the video, is all about surviving adversity and haters. What’s so potent about the video—and so specifically awful about this massacre—is that its subjects do seem to have struggled and triumphed to find the freedom to flip out together, and they are still cut down. It's bookended by Ziegler crying: As is appropriate, there's no take-home moral to make what happened seem okay.

The music video was nominated for Best Video at the ARIA Music Awards of 2017.

== Live performances ==
On 7 September 2016, Sia, Ziegler and several other dancers performed "The Greatest" live for the first time at the 2016 Apple launch of the iPhone 7 at San Francisco's Bill Graham Civic Auditorium. Sia and Ziegler performed the song during her performance at the 2016 iHeartRadio Music Festival on 23 September 2016. The song is included on Sia's Nostalgic for the Present Tour.

== Track listing ==
- Digital download
1. "The Greatest" (featuring Kendrick Lamar) – 3:30
- Digital download
1. "The Greatest" – 3:30
- Digital download
1. "The Greatest" (KDA Remix) (featuring Kendrick Lamar) – 3:41

== Charts ==
=== Weekly charts ===
Chart (2016–2017)	Peak position
Australia (ARIA)	2
Austria (Ö3 Austria Top 40)	4
Belarus Airplay (Eurofest)	60
Belgium (Ultratop 50 Flanders)	7
Belgium (Ultratop 50 Wallonia)	1
Canada Hot 100 (Billboard)	6
Canada AC (Billboard)	16
Canada CHR/Top 40 (Billboard)	8
Canada Hot AC (Billboard)	10
Colombia (National-Report)	66
Croatia International Airplay (Top lista)	1
Czech Republic Airplay (ČNS IFPI)	2
Czech Republic Singles Digital (ČNS IFPI)	2
Denmark (Tracklisten)	5
Euro Digital Songs (Billboard)	2
Finland (Suomen virallinen lista)	4
France (SNEP)	3
France Airplay (SNEP)	1
Germany (GfK)	3
Greece Digital (Billboard)	2
Hungary (Rádiós Top 40)	1
Hungary (Single Top 40)	2
Iceland (RÚV)	3
Ireland (IRMA)	3
Israel International Airplay (Media Forest)	2
Italy (FIMI)	5
Japan Hot 100 (Billboard)	54
Lebanon Airplay (Lebanese Top 20)	6
Luxembourg Digital (Billboard)	2
Mexico (Billboard Mexican Airplay)	1
Netherlands (Dutch Top 40)	4
Netherlands (Single Top 100)	8
New Zealand (Recorded Music NZ)	5
Norway (VG-lista)	2
Poland Airplay (ZPAV)	2
Portugal (AFP)	5
Romania (Airplay 100)	1
Russia Airplay (Tophit)	28
Scottish Singles Sales (Official Charts)	4
Scottish Singles Sales (Official Charts) Solo version	51
Slovakia Airplay (ČNS IFPI)	5
Slovakia Singles Digital (ČNS IFPI)	2
Slovenia (SloTop50)	1
South Korea International (Gaon)	6
Spain (Promusicae)	4
Sweden (Sverigetopplistan)	5
Switzerland (Schweizer Hitparade)	1
UK Singles (Official Charts)	5
US Billboard Hot 100	18
US Adult Pop Airplay (Billboard)	11
US Dance Club Songs (Billboard)	34
US Dance Airplay (Billboard)	20
US Pop Airplay (Billboard)	10
US Rhythmic Airplay (Billboard)	27
Venezuela English (Record Report)	3

=== Year-end charts ===
Chart (2016)	Position
Australia (ARIA)	46
Austria (Ö3 Austria Top 40)	50
Belgium (Ultratop Flanders)	61
Belgium (Ultratop Wallonia)	45
Canada (Canadian Hot 100)	62
Denmark (Tracklisten)	77
France (SNEP)	65
Germany (Official German Charts)	44
Hungary (Rádiós Top 40)	98
Hungary (Single Top 40)	22
Italy (FIMI)	49
Netherlands (Dutch Top 40)	30
Netherlands (Single Top 100)	70
Poland (ZPAV)	38
South Korean International Chart (Gaon)	87
Spain (PROMUSICAE)	76
Sweden (Sverigetopplistan)	66
Switzerland (Schweizer Hitparade)	48
UK Singles (Official Charts Company)	50
Chart (2017)	Position
Belgium (Ultratop Wallonia)	97
Canada (Canadian Hot 100)	72
France (SNEP)	172
Hungary (Rádiós Top 40)	23
Hungary (Single Top 40)	66
Hungary (Stream Top 40)	89
Israel (Media Forest)	33
Italy (FIMI)	92
Romania (Airplay 100)	14
Slovenia (SloTop50)	48
Spain Airplay (PROMUSICAE)	32
Switzerland (Schweizer Hitparade)	72
US Adult Pop Songs (Billboard)	37
US Radio Songs (Billboard)	69

== Certifications ==
Region	Certification	Certified units/sales
Australia (ARIA)	2× Platinum	140,000^{‡}
Austria (IFPI Austria)	Gold	15,000^{‡}
Belgium (BRMA)	Platinum	20,000^{‡}
Canada (Music Canada)	4× Platinum	320,000^{‡}
Denmark (IFPI Danmark)	2× Platinum	180,000^{‡}
France (SNEP)	Diamond	233,333^{‡}
Germany (BVMI)	3× Gold	600,000^{‡}
Italy (FIMI)	4× Platinum	200,000^{‡}
Mexico (AMPROFON)	Diamond	300,000^{‡}
New Zealand (RMNZ)	3× Platinum	90,000^{‡}
Poland (ZPAV)	4× Platinum	80,000^{‡}
Portugal (AFP)	Gold	5,000^{‡}
Spain (Promusicae)	Platinum	40,000^{‡}
Switzerland (IFPI Switzerland)	Platinum	30,000^{‡}
United Kingdom (BPI)	2× Platinum	1,200,000^{‡}
United States (RIAA)	4× Platinum	4,000,000^{‡}
^{‡} Sales+streaming figures based on certification alone.

== Release history ==
Region	Date	Format	Version	Label	Ref.
Worldwide	6 September 2016	Digital download	Duet	Monkey Puzzle; Inertia; RCA	
Italy	16 September 2016	Contemporary hit radio	Duet	Sony	
United States	27 September 2016	Contemporary hit radio	Duet	RCA	
Italy	29 September 2016	Contemporary hit radio	Solo	Sony	
United States	18 October 2016	Rhythmic contemporary	Duet	RCA	
United States	24 October 2016	Hot adult contemporary	Duet	RCA	
Various	23 December 2016	Digital download	KDA Remix	Monkey Puzzle; Inertia; RCA	

== See also ==
- List of Airplay 100 number ones of the 2010s
