= Fire Meet Gasoline =

Single by Sia

from the album 1000 Forms of Fear
- B-side: "Big Girls Cry" (Bleachers remix)
- Released: 19 June 2015
- Recorded: 2013–2014
- Studio: Hot Closet Studios (Los Angeles); Echo Park (Los Angeles)
- Genre: Pop
- Length: 4:01
- Label: Monkey Puzzle; RCA
- Songwriters: Sia Furler; Sam Dixon; Greg Kurstin
- Producer: Greg Kurstin

Sia singles chronology
"Golden" (2015)	"Fire Meet Gasoline" (2015)	"Alive" (2015)

Music video
- "Fire Meet Gasoline@ on YouTube

"Fire Meet Gasoline" is a song recorded by Australian singer and songwriter Sia for her sixth studio album, 1000 Forms of Fear (2014). It was written by Sia, Greg Kurstin and Samuel Dixon. Kurstin also produced the song. It was released in Germany on 19 June 2015 as the album's fourth and final single.

== Music video ==
The music video was released on 23 April 2015 on YouTube. It was filmed for Heidi Klum's lingerie line, and stars Klum and Game of Thrones actor Pedro Pascal as a couple in the throes of a dramatic relationship. Somewhere in the middle of the video, Klum's character sets their home on fire and together they watch it burn by its end. Sia never appears in the visual, but her blonde wig does. Sia herself was not involved with the shooting of the video, which was directed by Francesco Carrozzini. Although it was believed that she would release a new single, the singer said: "Fire Meet Gasoline is not an official music video, nor is it my new single. It's a lingerie commercial to which I licensed a song."

Klum said she was "thrilled" to have Sia's song in her video. "Sia is one of those incredible artists who puts so much passion into her work, and I am thrilled to be part of a music video," Klum said in a statement. "I remember being blown away the first time I heard her voice on 'Breathe Me'. And I love many songs she has written for other artists. I love great collaborations and to be given the opportunity to appear in the video while wearing my Heidi Klum Intimates collection, is definitely up there."

== Formats ==
CD single

1. "Fire Meet Gasoline" – 4:02
2. "Big Girls Cry" – (Bleachers Remix) – 4:05

== Personnel ==
- Greg Kurstin – bass, drums, guitar, mellotron, piano, xylophone

Technical

- Greg Kurstin – producer, engineer
- Jesse Shatkin – engineer
- Alex Pasco – additional engineering
- Julian Burg – additional engineering
- Manny Marroquin – mixing
- Chris Galland – mixing assistance
- Delbert Bowers – mixing assistance

== Charts ==
=== Weekly charts ===
Chart (2015)	Peak position
Australia (ARIA)	60
Austria (Ö3 Austria Top 40)	68
Belgium (Ultratip Bubbling Under Flanders)	12
Belgium (Ultratip Bubbling Under Wallonia)	4
France (SNEP)	39
Germany (GfK)	85
Lebanon (Lebanese Top 20)	5
Switzerland (Schweizer Hitparade)	47
UK Singles (Official Charts Company)	193

=== Year-end charts ===
Chart (2015)	Position
France (SNEP)	179

== Certifications ==
Region	Certification	Certified units/sales
Canada (Music Canada)	Gold	40,000^{‡}
^{‡} Sales+streaming figures based on certification alone.

== Release history ==
Region	Date	Format	Label	Ref
Germany	19 June 2015	CD single	Sony Music Entertainment	
