= Mashiro =

Japanese unisex given name and surname

- Gender: Unisex (usually female)
- Language: Japanese

Origin
- Origin: Japan
- Meaning: Different meanings depending on the kanji used

Other names
- Variant forms: Female: 28; Male: 77
- Related names: Mahiro

Mashiro (ましろ) is a unisex Japanese given name and a Japanese surname.

== Meaning ==
When used as a name, the Kana writing ましろ aka "Ma White" (茉白, "Ma Bai") is the standard reading of Mashiro. This reading is usually reserved for girls, as boys have their own kana readings for Mashiro. The first sound used for both genders is "Ma" which has many meanings that give a gentle and inclusive feeling. It also has a sense of openness, and is bright, active, expansive, and sociable when using the vowel "あ(a)" for the sound. In terms of luck, the status (地格は) of any given name is determined by the number of strokes in the Kanji characters used. The standard feminine reading of "Ma White" (茉白, "Ma Bai") is considered "excellent luck" (大吉, Daikichi). As a dictionary definition, the Kana ましろ is now obsolete for 茉白 ("pure white" or "blank" e.g. mind, paper).

== Written forms ==
Outside of its standard feminine reading of ましろ, Mashiro can be written in dozens of different ways for both sexes. Unique readings which are probable guesses are then split off from the larger group. For example, as a boy's name Mashiro has an extended list from one source that includes at least 77 syllabaries of which 15 are unique. As a girl's name, Mashiro can be written using at least 28 different syllabaries of which 10 are unique. As its impossible to list all of the combinations here, only the first 17 feminine writings in kanji are listed below.

Name/Reading	Meaning of Kanji	Luck
万白	"ten thousand", "white"	Good
麻白	"hemp", "white"	Excellent
満白	"enough", "white"	Good
茉代	"Ma", "era"	Excellent
麻志路	"hemp", "will", "road"	Excellent
真詩呂	"true", "poem", "Lu"	Middle
茉城	"Ma", "castle"	Good
真素	"true", "prime"	Bad
眞白	"Makoto", "white"	Excellent
麻代	"hemp", "era"	Excellent
摩白	"rub", "white"	Bad
真城	"true", "castle"	Bad
麻皓	"hemp", "Hao"	Excellent
磨白	"grind", "white"	Excellent
舞白	"dance", "white"	Bad
麻城	"hemp", "castle"	Bad
真白	"true", "white"	Excellent

== People ==
- Mashiro Ayano (綾野 ましろ), Japanese singer signed to Sacra Music
- Yuki Mashiro (ましろ ゆき; born 2001), Japanese professional wrestler

== Fictional characters ==
- Mashiro Kazahana, a character in the Japanese anime series My-HiME and My-Otome
- Mashiro Kuna, a character in the Japanese manga and anime series Bleach
- Mashiro Kumade, a character and sixth ranger in the Japanese tokusatsu series, No.1 Sentai Gozyuger.
- Mashiro Kurata, a character in franchise BanG Dream!
- Mashiro Mitsumine, a brown-haired monster from the Japanese four-panel manga Engaged to the Unidentified
- Mashiro Nijigaoka, a character in the Japanese anime series Soaring Sky! Pretty Cure
- Mashiro Shiina, a character in the Japanese light novel series The Pet Girl of Sakurasou
- Mashiro Shizuyama, a character in Role-playing game Blue Archive
- Moritaka Mashiro, a character in the Japanese manga series Bakuman
- Rima Mashiro, a character in the Japanese manga series Shugo Chara!
- Tomoya Mashiro, a character in franchise Ensemble Stars!
- Mashiro, or Fiona in the west, is a character and Hero from Xenoblade Chronicles 3.
