= Eye of the Needle (song) =

Promotional single by Sia

from the album 1000 Forms of Fear
- Released: 3 June 2014
- Recorded: 2013
- Genre: Pop
- Length: 4:09
- Label: Monkey Puzzle; RCA
- Songwriters: Sia Furler; Christopher Braide
- Producer: Greg Kurstin

Sia promotional singles chronology
| "Eye of the Needle" (2014) | "Salted Wound" (2015) |

Audio video
- Eye of the Needle on YouTube

"Eye of the Needle" is a song recorded by Australian singer Sia for her sixth studio album, 1000 Forms of Fear (2014). The song was released on 3 June 2014 as a promotional single by Inertia in Australia and Monkey Puzzle and RCA Records globally. It appeared on record charts of Australia, France and the United Kingdom.

== Background and composition ==
"Eye of the Needle" was released as streamed audio as a promotional tool for Sia's album 1000 Forms of Fear on 2 June 2014. The song was written by Chris Braide and Sia, while production was handled by Greg Kurstin.

== Collaboration ==
In 2015, Adult Swim released a remix of the song featuring Big Freedia as part of the Adult Swim Singles Program.

== Track listing ==
Digital download

1. "Eye of the Needle" – 4:09

== Credits and personnel ==
Credits adapted from liner notes of 1000 Forms of Fear and Tidal.

- Sia Furler – composer, lyricist
- Christopher Braide – composer, lyricist
- Greg Kurstin – producer, bass, drums, guitar, mellotron, piano, engineer
- Jesse Shatkin – engineer
- Alex Pasco – additional engineering
- Julian Burg – additional engineering
- Manny Marroquin – mixer
- Emily Lazar – masterer

== Charts ==
| Chart (2014) | Peak position |
|---|---|
| Australia (ARIA) | 36 |
| France (SNEP) | 71 |
| UK Singles (Official Charts Company) | 181 |

== Release history ==
| Region | Date | Format | Label |
|---|---|---|---|
| Australia | 3 June 2014 | Digital download | Inertia |
| Belgium | 3 June 2014 | Digital download | Monkey Puzzle; RCA |
| Finland | 3 June 2014 | Digital download | Monkey Puzzle; RCA |
| Germany | 3 June 2014 | Digital download | Monkey Puzzle; RCA |
| Portugal | 3 June 2014 | Digital download | Monkey Puzzle; RCA |
| Spain | 3 June 2014 | Digital download | Monkey Puzzle; RCA |
| Sweden | 3 June 2014 | Digital download | Monkey Puzzle; RCA |
| Switzerland | 3 June 2014 | Digital download | Monkey Puzzle; RCA |
