= Move Your Body (Sia song) =

- Single mix cover

Single by Sia

from the album This Is Acting
- Released: 6 January 2017
- Recorded: 2014–2015
- Studio: Echo Studio (Los Angeles, CA)
- Genre: Europop; dance-pop
- Length: 4:12 (single mix); 4:07 (album version)
- Label: Inertia; Monkey Puzzle; RCA
- Songwriters: Sia Furler; Greg Kurstin
- Producer: Greg Kurstin

Sia singles chronology
"Angel by the Wings" (2016)	"Move Your Body" (2017)	"Living Out Loud" (2017)

Lyric video
- "Move Your Body" on YouTube

"Move Your Body" is a song by Australian singer and songwriter Sia. It was released in January 2017 as the third single from her seventh studio album This Is Acting (2016). The song was used in the Super Bowl Lexus LC commercial in 2017 and Mitsubishi Xforce commercial in 2023.

== Background ==
"Move Your Body" was originally intended for Shakira, but was rejected. Sia commented on her interview in 2015 with Rolling Stone, saying, "One of them is a Shakira reject, which there's no doubt when you hear it. You'll know that it was a Shakira reject because I sound like Shakira."

== Critical reception ==
Overall response to the song was mixed. Bradley Stern of MuuMuse raved: "'Move Your Body', a pulsating Shakira offering, proves once again that the 'Titanium' singer is a more than welcome addition to the club scene, providing a sweaty, carnal call-to-arms filled with an instant catchy chant for the dance floor." Alex McCown-Levy of The A.V. Club wrote: "Move Your Body, [Sia's] attempt at a straight-up Europop dance-floor jam, suffers from a lack of distinction. It's an obvious play for a club hit, but it feels a bit predictable and safe—enjoyable, yes, but so calculated as to be stripped of any sense of engagement, like Robyn on autopilot." Carl Wilson of Billboard called the song "overwhelming", while Lindsay Zolandz of Vulture.com deemed it "the most ridiculous song on This Is Acting", and "catchy dance track" is how The New Zealand Herald's Kim Gillespie described the number. Idolator's Kathy Iandoli argued that the song "makes a valiant attempt to lighten things up a bit." Writing for The Guardian, Kitty Empire said: "There is nothing wrong with [Move Your Body], if you like your pop as gusty as a typhoon."

The Independent's Hugh Montgomery called the song a "stuttering dancefloor magnet", while Sal Cinquemani of Slant Magazine offered that "[songs like] “Move Your Body,” whose unabashed 4/4 beat and clattering EDM percussion are straight out of Rihanna's Loud, seem more like dated outtakes than underappreciated gems." Sarah Rodman of The Boston Globe wrote "The thumping groove of “Move Your Body” — which in a just world would be a dancefloor smash — has Shakira written all over it, and inspires the titular command."

== Lyric video ==
A lyric video of "Move Your Body" was uploaded on Sia's Vevo account on YouTube on 12 January 2017. The video is set in a photography studio in an American Mall in 1987, and features a girl (portrayed by Lilliana Ketchman) and her parents in a glamour photo shoot until she runs off set, where she finds Sia's signature black-and-blonde wig in a dressing room and tries it on. She then photobombs strangers' posed pictures until her parents drag her away, but the strangers invite her back for even more photos and dance along with her.

== Versions ==
- Move Your Body (Album version) – 4:07
- Move Your Body (Single mix) – 4:12
- Move Your Body (Alan Walker Remix) – 3:41

== Charts ==
=== Weekly charts ===
Chart (2016–17)	Peak position
Australia (ARIA)	34
Australia Dance (ARIA)	9
Belgium (Ultratip Bubbling Under Flanders)	11
Belgium (Ultratip Bubbling Under Wallonia)	2
Canada Hot 100 (Billboard)	82
Czech Republic Airplay (ČNS IFPI)	95
Finland (Suomen virallinen lista)	8
France (SNEP)	62
Hungary (Single Top 40)	33
Ireland (IRMA)	19
Italy (FIMI)	90
Mexico (Billboard Mexican Airplay)	15
New Zealand Heatseekers (RMNZ)	2
Norway (VG-lista)	3
Poland Airplay (ZPAV)	2
Poland Dance (ZPAV)	5
Russia Airplay (Tophit)	87
Scottish Singles Sales (Official Charts)	27
Spain (Promusicae)	45
Sweden (Sverigetopplistan)	57
UK Singles (Official Charts)	59
US Dance Club Songs (Billboard)	1
US Dance Airplay (Billboard)	24

=== Year-end Charts ===
Chart (2017)	Position
Latvia Airplay (LaIPA)	46
Poland Airplay (ZPAV)	14
US Dance Club Songs (Billboard)	7

== Certifications ==
Region	Certification	Certified units/sales
Denmark (IFPI Danmark)	Gold	45,000^{‡}
France (SNEP)	Gold	66,666^{‡}
Germany (BVMI)	Gold	200,000^{‡}
Italy (FIMI)	Gold	25,000^{‡}
Mexico (AMPROFON)	2× Platinum	120,000^{‡}
New Zealand (RMNZ)	Platinum	30,000^{‡}
Poland (ZPAV)	2× Platinum	100,000^{‡}
Sweden (GLF)	Gold	20,000^{‡}
United Kingdom (BPI)	Gold	400,000^{‡}
United States (RIAA)	Gold	500,000^{‡}
^{‡} Sales+streaming figures based on certification alone.

== Release history ==
Region	Date	Format	Label
Worldwide	6 January 2017	Digital download	Monkey Puzzle; Inertia; RCA

== Alan Walker Remix ==
"Move Your Body (Alan Walker Remix)"

Remix by Sia and Alan Walker

from the album This Is Acting (Deluxe Edition)
- Released: October 21, 2016
- Length: 3:39
- Label: MER
- Songwriters: Greg Kurstin; Sia
- Producers: Mood Melodies; Alan Walker

Alan Walker chronology
"Sing Me to Sleep" (2016)	"Move Your Body (Alan Walker Remix)" (2016)	"Routine" (2016)

Audio
- "Move Your Body (Alan Walker Remix)" on YouTube

Norwegian DJ and record producer Alan Walker released a remix of "Move Your Body" from Sia's album This is Acting (Deluxe Edition) on October 21, 2016. It was viewed over 50 millions on YouTube.

=== Background ===
In an interview with Billboard, Walker said, "Two years ago, I heard her voice and thought ‘whoa’". He added, "It’s still weird to think that now I’m going to have a remix with her. I’m very thankful for that opportunity". He added, "This is a good opportunity to show that I also work with other genres and tempos, not just slower stuff".

In an interview with the Norwegian newspaper Verdens Gang, Walker's manager Gunnar Greve said:

It is an honorable mission for Alan and us. Sia is undeniably one of the world's greatest artists, and we are all sworn fans, both musically and artistically.

=== Critical reception ===
Michael Sundius of Billboard described the remix as an “infectious four-on-the-floor” track that effectively showcases Sia’s vocals, while retaining Alan Walker’s signature sentimentality and candor. In their review of This Is Acting (Deluxe Edition), Entertainment Weekly rated the song 3 out of 5, stating, "One of This Is Acting's weaker tracks gets a thudding EDM makeover—way more effective at getting you to do what the title commands".

=== Track listing ===
US Vinyl

1. "Move Your Body" (Club Mix) - 4:58
2. "Move Your Body" (Radio Mix) - 3:38
3. "Move Your Body" (Club Mix Instrumental) - 4:58

=== Charts ===
Chart (2016)	Peak position
Norway (VG-lista)	3
France (SNEP)	154
Sweden (Sverigetopplistan)	57

=== Certifications ===
Region	Certification	Certified units/sales
Sweden (GLF)	Gold	20,000^{*}
^{*} Sales figures based on certification alone.

== See also ==
- List of number-one dance singles of 2017 (U.S.)
