= Mahiro Takano =

Japanese karateka (born 2006)

Personal information
- Full name: Mahiro Takano
- Nationality: Japanese
- Born: 15 July 2006 (age 18); Japan
- Occupation: Martial artist
- Years active: 2010–present

Sport
- Country: Japan
- Sport: Karate
- Rank: 1st (in her age group)

Mahiro Takano (Japanese: 高野万優, born 15 July 2006) is a Japanese karateka, six-time Japanese champion at primary-school level in the Kata discipline. In 2015, at the age of nine, she starred in the music video for Sia's song "Alive".

== Biography ==
Takano's hometown is Nagaoka, Niigata Prefecture.
