= 1000 Forms of Fear =

Studio album by Sia
- Released: 4 July 2014
- Recorded: 2013–2014
- Studios: Echo (Los Angeles); Larrabee (North Hollywood); The Lodge (New York)
- Genre: Electropop
- Length: 48:41
- Labels: Inertia; Monkey Puzzle; RCA
- Producers: Jesse Shatkin; Greg Kurstin; Chris Braide; Diplo

Sia chronology
Best Of... (2012)	1000 Forms of Fear (2014)	This Is Acting (2016)

Singles from 1000 Forms of Fear
- 1. "Chandelier" Released: 17 March 2014; 2. "Big Girls Cry" Released: 25 June 2014; 3. "Elastic Heart" Released: 9 January 2015; 4. "Fire Meet Gasoline" Released: 19 June 2015

1000 Forms of Fear is the sixth studio album by Australian singer Sia. It was released on 4 July 2014 by Monkey Puzzle and RCA Records worldwide, and Inertia Records in Australia. Primarily an electropop album, the record also incorporates influences from reggae and hip hop. Lyrically, the record is focused on Sia struggling to deal with drug addiction and a misdiagnosis of bipolar disorder at the time, later rediagnosed as complex PTSD in 2019.

1000 Forms of Fear received generally favorable reviews from music critics, who praised Sia's vocals as well as the album's lyrical content. The album debuted at number one on the US Billboard 200 with first-week sales of 52,000 copies. The release also charted atop the charts of Australia and Canada, and reached the top five charts of Denmark, New Zealand, Norway, Sweden, Switzerland, and the United Kingdom. As of 26 October 2015, it has been certified gold by the RIAA denoting 500,000 equivalent-album units sold in the United States. As of January 2016, the album has sold 1 million copies worldwide.

The album spawned four singles. Its lead single, "Chandelier", released in March 2014, became a worldwide top-10 single; it also peaked at number eight on the US Billboard Hot 100, becoming the first song by Sia to enter the chart as a lead artist. "Big Girls Cry" was released in June 2014. Sia's solo version of "Elastic Heart", which was originally a collaboration with The Weeknd and Diplo, was released in January 2015, and reached the top 20 of the Hot 100. "Fire Meet Gasoline" was released as the fourth and final single in Germany on 19 June 2015. The official music video for "Chandelier" has been viewed on YouTube more than 2 billion times, and the video for "Elastic Heart" has been viewed more than 1 billion times.

To promote the project, Sia appeared on a number of TV shows, including The Ellen DeGeneres Show and Jimmy Kimmel Live!, where she recruited Maddie Ziegler, who starred in three music videos from the album, as her persona onstage, during 2014 and 2015. 1000 Forms of Fear earned Sia three ARIA Music Awards in 2014 and was listed as one of the best albums of 2014 by several publications, including The Boston Globe and Rolling Stone. The lead single "Chandelier" received four Grammy nominations for Song of the Year, Record of the Year, Best Pop Solo Performance, and Best Music Video.

== Background ==
In 2010, Sia released her fifth studio album, We Are Born, which peaked at number two on the ARIA Albums Chart and was certified gold by the Australian Recording Industry Association. Following the release of We Are Born, Sia decided to retire from the career as a recording artist and established a career as a songwriter. She wrote the song "Titanium" for American singer Alicia Keys, but it was later sent to David Guetta, who included Sia's original demo vocals on the song and released it as a single in 2011. "Titanium" was a commercial success worldwide, peaking within the top five of record charts in the United States, Australia and numerous European regions. However, Sia was not pleased with the success of the single: "[...] I never even knew it was gonna happen, and I was really upset. Because I had just retired, I was trying to be a pop songwriter, not an artist." From 2011 to 2013, Sia became well known for writing songs for Christina Aguilera, Beyoncé, Flo Rida, and Rihanna.

By September 2013, Sia was recording vocal tracks at her home studio with the hope of releasing a new album the following spring. Later that year, a team of RCA Records representatives including the label's CEO Peter Edge met with Sia to discuss a record deal. The singer agreed to a contract for a new album in which she was not obliged to tour or do press appearances to promote the album. In an interview published by NME in February 2015, Sia revealed that 1000 Forms of Fear was released as a contractual obligation: "Basically, I put this out to get out of my publishing deal. I was planning to be a pop song writer for other artists. But my publishing deal was as an artist so I had to put one more album out. I didn't want to get famous so I kept all the songs I wanted and had a lot of fun making it."

== Composition ==
1000 Forms of Fear is primarily an electropop album, with influences of hip hop and reggae. It opens with "Chandelier", an electropop song that features a reggae-influenced beat. Lyrically, the track talks about "the glitter and fatigue of a party girl's life." The follow-up, "Big Girls Cry", was compared to Alanis Morissette's "Hands Clean". On "Burn the Pages", Sia described a friend she wants to cheer up: "You're twisted up like a slipknot / Tied by a juicehead who just took his T-shot." "Eye of the Needle" is a "military-march" piano ballad, while "Hostage" is a new wave pop and ska track that features Sia's voice "cracking like a punk singer." The sixth song, "Straight for the Knife", is instrumented by strings and lyrically details a tempestuous relationship: "But will someone find me swinging from the rafters / From hanging on your every word."

"Fair Game", where Sia sings "Watch me squirm baby, but you're just what I need," is a minimalist and string-laden song about the desire to find an equal partner. The solo version of "Elastic Heart", which originally featured The Weeknd and Diplo, is a trap song. The song addresses "the overwhelming strength [Sia] needed to convince herself that life was worth living after coming out of a crushing relationship." "Free the Animal" lyrically "imagines being killed in lurid, masochistic detail" with the lyrics "Detonate me / Shoot me like a cannon ball / Granulate me / Kill me like an animal." The tenth song, "Fire Meet Gasoline", was compared to Beyoncé's "Halo" by Harriet Gibsone from The Guardian. "Cellophane" is an electropop track, where Sia likens herself to "a basket filled with pain." 1000 Forms of Fear concludes with "Dressed in Black", which Heather Phares of AllMusic described as a ballad "with more depth than the ones she writes for hire."

== Singles ==
"Chandelier"
"Chandelier", a reggae-influenced electropop song, served as the album's lead single

"Chandelier" served as 1000 Forms of Fear's lead single. It was released for digital download onto the iTunes Stores on 17 March 2014. A music video for the song was released on 6 May 2014 and has been viewed on YouTube more than 2 billion times. It features dancer Maddie Ziegler in a blonde wig resembling a Sia hairstyle. The single became a commercial success, peaking at number eight on the US Billboard Hot 100, becoming the first single by Sia to appear on the chart as a lead artist. "Chandelier" also peaked within the top five of record charts in Europe and Oceania countries, including: Flanders and France (number one), Australia and Norway (number two), New Zealand (number three), United Kingdom (number six), and Slovakia (number five). The track was certified triple platinum by the Australian Recording Industry Association and gold by Recorded Music NZ.

"Big Girls Cry" was made available for music download on 25 June. On 2 April 2015, a music video was released, starring Ziegler in the same blonde wig in front of a black background, contorting her face and using her hands to express a slew of emotions.

"Elastic Heart" was released as the third single from 1000 Forms of Fear in January 2015. A music video for the song was released on 7 January 2015 and features Ziegler in the same blonde wig dancing in a giant birdcage opposite actor Shia LaBeouf. It has been viewed on YouTube more than 1 billion times. "Elastic Heart" peaked at number 17 on the US Billboard Hot 100 and charted within the top five charts of several countries, including Australia and Ireland.

"Fire Meet Gasoline" was officially released as the fourth and last single from the album in Germany on 19 June 2015. A music video was released on 23 April 2015 on YouTube. It was filmed for Heidi Klum's lingerie line, and stars Klum and Game of Thrones actor Pedro Pascal.

=== Promotional singles ===
"Eye of the Needle" was released digitally on 3 June 2014 as a promotional single.

== Promotion ==
I already have a much larger concept for this album and for how I'm going to present it and that was: I don't want to be famous. If Amy Winehouse was a beehive then I guess I'm a blonde bob. I thought 'well if that's my brand, how can I avoid having to use my face to sell something', so my intention was to create a blonde bob brand. Throughout this whole thing I'll put a different person in a blonde bob and either they lip-synch while I'm doing a live performance or they perform a dance or do some sort of performance while I have my back to the audience, as with Ellen.

— Sia

In an interview with Dazed & Confused, Sia explained that she had decided not to show her face in videos and press shots in the campaign for 1000 Forms of Fear; instead, she focused on creating visual art through her videos. During the promotion of the album, Sia recruited Ziegler to be her persona on stage and performed with her back facing to the camera. On 19 May 2014, Sia performed "Chandelier" on The Ellen DeGeneres Show, where Maddie Ziegler recreated the choreography in the music video. Sia also performed the song on Late Night with Seth Meyers on 9 June 2014, with Girls star Lena Dunham performing the choreography. On 4 July 2014, Sia made an appearance on Jimmy Kimmel Live!, where she performed "Chandelier", "Big Girls Cry" and "Elastic Heart".

On 30 July 2014, Sia performed "Chandelier", "Elastic Heart" and "Big Girls Cry" on the VH1's show "SoundClash". On 17 January 2015, Sia performed "Chandelier" and "Elastic Heart" on Saturday Night Live. On 8 February 2015, Sia and Ziegler together with actress Kristen Wiig performed "Chandelier" in a room reminiscent of the video set on the 2015 Grammy Awards telecast.

== Critical reception ==
Professional ratings
Aggregate scores
Source	Rating
AnyDecentMusic?	7.1/10
Metacritic	76/100
Review scores
Source	Rating
AllMusic	4.5/5 stars
The A.V. Club	C
The Daily Telegraph	4/5 stars
The Guardian	3/5 stars
The Independent	4/5 stars
Los Angeles Times	3/4 stars
The Observer	3/5 stars
Robert Christgau	(1-star Honorable Mention)
Rolling Stone	4/5 stars
Slant Magazine	4/5 stars
Spin	8/10

1000 Forms of Fear received generally positive reviews from critics. The Boston Globe critic Sarah Rodman described the release as "dynamite," while Heather Phares from AllMusic called the album "the sound of [Sia] owning her success." Writing for The Daily Telegraph, Helen Brown praised the album's production and "inspirational" lyrics showcasing Sia struggling to deal with drug addiction and bipolar disorder. Rolling Stone's Julianne Escobedo Shepherd simply wrote that "she sounds like a superstar;" while Maura Johnston of Spin characterised 1000 Forms of Fear as "a chunk of the human emotional spectrum committed to record." On behalf of The New York Times, Jon Pareles lauded the "loopy, unresolved passions" on the album in favour of "the triumphal, laminated, computer-perfected tone of Sia’s clients."

Writing for Slant Magazine, Annie Galvin opined that 1000 Forms of Fear "should be the vessel that rockets the singer out of relative obscurity and into the stratosphere populated by those more recognizable stars who've come to dominate the pop-music universe thanks, in part, to her songwriting skills." Mikael Wood writing for the Los Angeles Times praised Sia's vocals and the production held by Greg Kurstin. Likewise, Entertainment Weekly's Adam Markovitz positively viewed Sia's voice as "astonishing," giving the album a B score. Robert Christgau gave the album a one-star honorable mention, citing "Chandelier" and "Elastic Heart" as highlights.

On a less enthusiastic review, The Guardian's Harriet Gibsone shared that the album was so impeccable and "contemporary-sounding" that "its impact may fade with time." The A.V. Club writer Annie Zaleski wrote: "1000 Forms of Fear certainly has the songs and contemporary sheen to make Sia a star in her own right, but it's at the expense of both her emotional intimacy and her offbeat personality."

=== Accolades ===
Sarah Rodman of The Boston Globe labelled 1000 Forms of Fear the "Best Surprise" of 2014. It ranked number 13 on Digital Spy's list of Top 15 Albums of 2014. Jon Pareles from The New York Times placed the album at number 5 on his list of favourite albums of the year. It also appeared on the lists of the best albums of 2014 of Slant Magazine (number 13) and The Daily Telegraph (number 44). Rolling Stone ranked it number 20 on its list of 20 Best Pop Albums of 2014. At the ARIA Music Awards of 2014, Sia won Album of the Year, Best Female Artist and Best Pop Release for 1000 Forms of Fear. The lead single "Chandelier" received four Grammy nominations for Song of the Year, Record of the Year, Best Pop Solo Performance and Best Music Video at the 57th Grammy Awards.

== Commercial performance ==
1000 Forms of Fear debuted atop the US Billboard 200 with first-week sales of 52,000 copies. By doing so, it became the lowest sales figure for a number-one album on the chart in nearly two years. The Guardian's Clem Bastow commented on the album's success in the United States: "Australian artists typically fare better in the Billboard Hot 100 singles chart, but even then, Sia finds herself in rarefied company." On behalf of The Sydney Morning Herald, George Palathingal opined that the album's debuting atop the Billboard 200 is the result of "a stroke of (anti-)marketing genius" and "a case of quality pop music standing proud." 1000 Forms of Fear had sold 374,000 copies in the United States as of December 2015.

In Australia, the release debuted atop the ARIA Albums Chart on 20 July 2014 and remained on the chart for 20 weeks. In April 2015, the album was certified platinum by the Australian Recording Industry Association for having shipped 70,000 units in the country. 1000 Forms of Fear also peaked at number one on the Canadian Albums Chart. The release also charted within the top five albums charts of several countries, including Norway (number two), New Zealand, Sweden and Switzerland (number four) and Denmark (number five). In the United Kingdom, 1000 Forms of Fear peaked at number 5 on the UK Albums Chart and was certified gold by the British Phonographic Industry. As of February 2016, the album has sold 268,949 copies in the United Kingdom. As of January 2016, it has sold 1 million copies worldwide.

== Track listing ==
Credits adapted from 1000 Forms of Fear liner notes

No.	Title	Writer(s)	Producer(s)	Length
1.	"Chandelier"	Sia Furler; Jesse Shatkin	Shatkin; Greg Kurstin	3:36
2.	"Big Girls Cry"	Furler; Christopher Braide	Kurstin; Braide^{[a]}	3:30
3.	"Burn the Pages"	Furler; Kurstin	Kurstin	3:15
4.	"Eye of the Needle"	Furler; Braide	Kurstin; Braide	4:08
5.	"Hostage"	Furler; Nick Valensi	Kurstin	2:56
6.	"Straight for the Knife"	Furler; Justin Parker	Kurstin	3:31
7.	"Fair Game"	Furler; Kurstin	Kurstin	3:51
8.	"Elastic Heart"	Furler; Thomas Wesley Pentz; Andrew Swanson	Diplo; Kurstin^{[b]}	4:17
9.	"Free the Animal"	Furler; Kurstin; Jasper Leak	Kurstin	4:24
10.	"Fire Meet Gasoline"	Furler; Kurstin; Samuel Dixon	Kurstin	4:01
11.	"Cellophane"	Furler; Kurstin	Kurstin	4:25
12.	"Dressed in Black"	Furler; Kurstin; Grant Michaels	Kurstin	6:40
Total length:				48:28

1000 Forms of Fear – Japan bonus tracks
No.	Title	Writer(s)	Producer(s)	Length
13.	"Chandelier" (piano version)	Furler	Shatkin; Kurstin	4:00
14.	"Chandelier" (Four Tet Remix)	Furler	Shatkin; Kurstin; Kieran Hebden (remix)	4:30
Total length:				57:11

1000 Forms of Fear – French bonus tracks
No.	Title	Writer(s)	Producer(s)	Length
13.	"Chandelier" (piano version)	Furler	Shatkin; Kurstin	4:00
14.	"Chandelier" (Owlle Remix)	Furler	Shatkin; Kurstin; France Picoulet (remix)	4:18
15.	"Chandelier" (Four Tet Remix)	Furler	Shatkin; Kurstin; Hebden (remix)	4:30
Total length:				1:01:29

1000 Forms of Fear – 10th anniversary deluxe LP bonus tracks
No.	Title	Writer(s)	Producer(s)	Length
13.	"Elastic Heart" (featuring the Weeknd & Diplo)	Furler; Pentz; Swanson; Abel Tesfaye	Diplo; Kurstin^{[b]}	4:18
14.	"Chandelier" (piano version)	Furler	Shatkin; Kurstin	4:00
15.	"Elastic Heart" (piano version)	Furler	Diplo; Kurstin^{[b]}	4:10
16.	"Chandelier" (Four Tet Remix)	Furler	Shatkin; Kurstin; Hebden (remix)	4:30
17.	"Chandelier" (Plastic Plates Remix)	Furler	Shatkin; Kurstin	4:23
18.	"Elastic Heart" (Clams Casino Remix)	Furler; Pentz; Swanson	Diplo; Kurstin^{[b]}	5:19
19.	"Elastic Heart" (Blood Diamonds Remix)	Furler; Pentz; Swanson	Diplo; Kurstin^{[b]}	5:07
20.	"Big Girls Cry" (Odesza Remix)	Furler	Kurstin; Braide^{[a]}	4:21
21.	"Big Girls Cry" (Bleachers Remix)	Furler	Kurstin; Braide^{[a]}	4:04
Total length:				1:28:53

Notes

- ^a signifies a vocal producer
- ^b signifies a co-producer

== Personnel ==
- Sia – vocals
- Greg Kurstin – drums, guitar (1–6, 8–12), mellotron (1–2, 4, 6–10, 12), piano (1–4, 6–11), bass guitar (2–12), percussion (2, 9), Hammond organ (2, 5), keyboards (3, 11), xylophone (7, 9–12), celeste (12), chamberlin (12)
- Jesse Shatkin – drums (1), keyboards (1)
- Nick Valensi – guitar (5)

Production

- Delbert Bowers – mixing assistant (1–2, 4–5, 8–10, 12)
- Chris Braide – vocal production (2), vocal recording (2)
- Julian Burg – additional engineering
- Diplo – production (8), drum programming (8), engineering (8)
- Chris Galland – mixing assistant (1–2, 4–5, 8–10, 12)
- Rob Kleiner – vocal recording (8)
- Greg Kurstin – production (1–7, 9–12), co-production (8), vocal recording (2), engineering, mixing (3, 6–7, 11)
- Emily Lazar – mastering
- Manny Marroquin – mixing (1–2, 4–5, 8–10, 12)
- Rich Morales – mastering assistant
- Alex Pasco – additional engineering
- Jesse Shatkin – production (1), programming (1), engineering
- Sia – executive production
- Andrew Swanson – drum programming (8), engineering (8)

== Charts ==
=== Weekly charts ===
Chart (2014–15)	Peak position
Australian Albums (ARIA)	1
Austrian Albums (Ö3 Austria)	19
Belgian Albums (Ultratop Flanders)	34
Belgian Albums (Ultratop Wallonia)	10
Canadian Albums (Billboard)	1
Danish Albums (Hitlisten)	5
Dutch Albums (Album Top 100)	22
Finnish Albums (Suomen virallinen lista)	9
French Albums (SNEP)	7
German Albums (Offizielle Top 100)	30
Irish Albums (IRMA)	6
Italian Albums (FIMI)	33
Japanese Albums (Oricon)	55
Mexican Albums (AMPROFON)	48
New Zealand Albums (RMNZ)	4
Norwegian Albums (VG-lista)	2
Polish Albums (ZPAV)	7
Portuguese Albums (AFP)	43
Scottish Albums (Official Charts)	5
Spanish Albums (Promusicae)	30
Swedish Albums (Sverigetopplistan)	4
Swiss Albums (Schweizer Hitparade)	4
UK Albums (Official Charts)	5
US Billboard 200	1

=== Year-end charts ===
Chart (2014)	Position
Australian Albums Chart	34
Belgian Albums Chart (Wallonia)	82
French Albums Chart	44
Swedish Albums Chart	69
Swiss Albums Chart	75
US Billboard 200	131

Chart (2015)	Position
Australian Albums (ARIA)	14
Belgian Albums (Ultratop Flanders)	124
Belgian Albums Chart (Wallonia)	50
Danish Albums (Hitlisten)	23
French Albums Chart	33
Spanish Albums (PROMUSICAE)	99
Swiss Albums (Swiss Hitparade)	52
UK Albums Chart	24
US Billboard 200	40

Chart (2016)	Position
Danish Albums (Hitlisten)	62
UK Albums Chart	89
US Billboard 200	129

== Certifications and sales ==
Region	Certification	Certified units/sales
Australia (ARIA)	Platinum	70,000^{^}
Brazil (Pro-Música Brasil)	3× Platinum	120,000^{‡}
Canada (Music Canada)	3× Platinum	240,000^{‡}
Denmark (IFPI Danmark)	2× Platinum	40,000^{‡}
France (SNEP)	Platinum	100,000^{*}
Germany (BVMI)	Gold	100,000^{‡}
Italy (FIMI)	Platinum	50,000^{‡}
Mexico (AMPROFON)	2× Platinum	120,000^{‡}
New Zealand (RMNZ)	2× Platinum	30,000^{‡}
Poland (ZPAV)	Diamond	100,000^{‡}
Singapore (RIAS)	Gold	5,000^{*}
Sweden (GLF)	Platinum	40,000^{‡}
United Kingdom (BPI)	Platinum	300,000^{‡}
United States (RIAA)	2× Platinum	2,000,000^{‡}
^{*} Sales figures based on certification alone.^{^} Shipments figures based on certification alone.^{‡} Sales+streaming figures based on certification alone.

== Release history ==
Region	Date	Format(s)	Edition	Label	Ref.
Australia	4 July 2014	CD; digital download	Standard	Inertia	
New Zealand	4 July 2014	CD; digital download	Standard	Inertia	
Germany	4 July 2014	CD; digital download	Standard	RCA; Sony	
United Kingdom	7 July 2014	CD; digital download	Standard	Monkey Puzzle Records; RCA	
United States	8 July 2014	CD; digital download	Standard	Monkey Puzzle Records; RCA	
Germany	1 August 2014	Vinyl	Standard	RCA; Sony	
Worldwide	1 May 2015	CD; digital download	Deluxe	Monkey Puzzle; RCA	

== See also ==
- Greg Kurstin production discography
- List of Billboard 200 number-one albums of 2014
- List of number-one albums of 2014 (Australia)
