= Alive (Sia song) =

Single by Sia

from the album This Is Acting
- Released: 25 September 2015
- Recorded: 2015
- Studio: Harmony Recording Studios (Los Angeles, CA); Hot Closet Studios (Los Angeles, CA); The Rib Cage (Los Angeles, CA)
- Genre: Pop; synth-pop
- Length: 4:23
- Label: Inertia; Monkey Puzzle; RCA
- Songwriters: Sia Furler; Adele Adkins; Tobias Jesso Jr.
- Producer: Jesse Shatkin

Sia singles chronology
"Fire Meet Gasoline" (2015)	"Alive" (2015)	"Bang My Head" (2015)

Music video
- "Alive" on YouTube

"Alive" is the lead single from Australian singer and songwriter Sia's seventh studio album This Is Acting (2016). It was co-written by Sia, Adele, and Tobias Jesso Jr. The song was produced by Jesse Shatkin. "Alive" was released on 25 September 2015. The song was originally intended for Adele's third studio album, 25, along with "Bird Set Free". However, since Adele decided not to use the songs, she let Sia use them for her seventh studio album. Musically, it is a midtempo pop and synth-pop song.

On 22 September 2015, Sia posted a tweet on Twitter which hinted that the single would be released on 25 September. The next day she released a 15-second preview of the music video on her Vevo account. The song achieved moderate commercial success, reaching the top 40 in over 15 countries, including Spain, Belgium and France. In the UK, the song reached number 30 on the UK Singles Chart. The song reached number 56 on the US Billboard Hot 100, failing to reach the upper half of the chart. The music video for the song was released on 5 November 2015. It has received over 300 million views.

The song received generally positive reviews, with critics praising Sia's powerful, electrifying vocals. Sia has performed the song multiple times on camera, including The Ellen DeGeneres Show, Saturday Night Live, and The X Factor.

== Background ==
In September 2015, Sia confirmed that This Is Acting's lead single "Alive" would be released later that month and was originally written for Adele. She described that the song "was about Adele's life" and "written in Adele's perspective." She further explained to Ryan Seacrest that the song was written in a writing session with Adele for her third album 25, but was rejected at the last minute. Rihanna also rejected the tune.

== Release ==
On 22 September 2015, Sia posted a tweet on Twitter which hinted that the single would be released on 25 September. A 15-second preview was uploaded to Sia's Vevo channel on 23 September and the release date was made 1 day earlier to 24 September. Sia further updated on her Twitter that it would be released on the morning of 24 September. The single was premiered on Snapchat at about 7 a.m. and released to other services soon after.

== Composition ==
"Alive" is written in the key of F♯ minor with a tempo of 100 beats per minute. The song follows a chord progression of F♯m–C♯m–D–F♯m–C♯m–D–Bsus2, and Sia's vocals span from F♯_{3} to E_{5}. "Alive" is a midtempo pop and synth-pop power ballad. Dan Weiss of Billboard found the song similar to Demi Lovato's "Skyscraper" (2011).

== Music video ==
The music video for the song directed by Sia and Daniel Askill was released on 5 November 2015. It was shot by cinematographer Mathieu Plainfosse. It stars child karate star Mahiro Takano sporting Sia’s black and blonde wig performing her karate moves in an abandoned room. The music video was filmed in Japan.

A lyric video was uploaded on 20 October 2015 on Sia's Vevo channel. Shot in de-saturated colours, the video features female figures without their faces shown. They wear two-toned black and blonde wigs, and the lyrics of the song are written on walls.

The Japanese official music video was released on 7 March 2016. It stars Japanese actress Tao Tsuchiya, who studies Buyō at Japan Women's College of Physical Education, dancing uniquely. Due to a big attention to this video from Japan, "Alive" peaked No. 1 on Billboard Japan Hot 100 on 21 March 2016.

== Reception ==
Rolling Stone critic Jon Blistein described Furler's vocals as "devastating, electrifying," and wrote, "while the dramatic build of "Alive" sounds straight out of Adele's wheelhouse, the outsized pop production — courtesy of Jesse Shatkin — and the ragged, throat-cracking, enrapturing vocal run Sia embarks on at the end are quintessentially her." Dan Weiss of Billboard said that the song has a "chandelier-shattering chorus that proves a power ballad can still be, well, powerful in the age of EDM." "Alive" also came in at #56 on the annual Triple J Hottest 100 for 2015.

== Commercial performance ==
In the United States, the song debuted at number 56 on the US Billboard Hot 100, selling 54,000 copies in its first week. In Australia, the song debuted at number 10 and has been certified platinum by the Australian Recording Industry Association.

== Live performances ==
Sia first performed the song during the forty-first season of Saturday Night Live, with Donald Trump hosting, on 7 November 2015 with Mina Nishimura dancing. Later, throughout December the song was performed on The Ellen DeGeneres Show as well as The Voice on 1 December, followed by an X Factor UK performance on 6 December. Sia appeared on French TV show C à vous on 9 December and two days later, 11 December on C'Cauet. The same day she gave a performance on The Graham Norton Show and then performed the single on New Year's Eve on TFI Friday. When performing the song live, Sia usually sings in the key of E minor, one tone below the recorded version.

== Track listing ==
Digital download

1. "Alive" – 4:23

CD single

1. "Alive" – 4:23
2. "Alive" (instrumental) – 4:23

Digital download - Remixes EP

1. "Alive" (Plastic Plates Remix) – 4:58
2. "Alive" (Maya Jane Coles Remix) – 5:07
3. "Alive" (AFSHeeN Remix) – 3:16
4. "Alive" (Boehm Remix) – 3:50
5. "Alive" (Cahill Remix) – 4:18

== Charts ==
=== Weekly charts ===
Weekly chart performance for "Alive"
Chart (2015–2016)	Peak position
Australia (ARIA)	10
Austria (Ö3 Austria Top 40)	39
Belgium (Ultratop 50 Flanders)	49
Belgium (Ultratop 50 Wallonia)	40
Canada Hot 100 (Billboard)	28
Canada CHR/Top 40 (Billboard)	36
Canada Hot AC (Billboard)	40
Czech Republic Singles Digital (ČNS IFPI)	36
Finland Download (Latauslista)	5
France (SNEP)	17
Hungary (Single Top 40)	37
Ireland (IRMA)	44
Italy (FIMI)	57
Japan Hot 100 (Billboard)	28
Japan Hot Overseas (Billboard)	1
New Zealand (Recorded Music NZ)	29
Poland Airplay (ZPAV)	39
Scottish Singles Sales (Official Charts)	14
Slovakia Airplay (ČNS IFPI)	82
Slovakia Singles Digital (ČNS IFPI)	31
Spain (Promusicae)	21
Sweden (Sverigetopplistan)	69
Switzerland (Schweizer Hitparade)	30
UK Singles (Official Charts)	30
US Billboard Hot 100	56
US Pop Airplay (Billboard)	43
US Adult Pop Airplay (Billboard)	33
US Dance Club Songs (Billboard)	28

=== Year-end charts ===
2015 year-end chart performance for "Alive"
Chart (2015)	Position
Australian Artist Singles (ARIA)	20

2016 year-end chart performance for "Alive"
Chart (2016)	Position
Australian Artist Singles (ARIA)	30

== Covers ==
In 2019, American rock band Daughtry released a cover of the song after frontman Chris Daughtry performed it on The Masked Singer as the "Rottweiler".

In 2021, Japanese singer Mao Abe released a cover of the song on her album MY INNER CHILD MUSEUM.

== Certifications ==
Certifications and sales for "Alive"
Region	Certification	Certified units/sales
Australia (ARIA)	Platinum	70,000^{‡}
Canada (Music Canada)	Platinum	80,000^{‡}
Denmark (IFPI Danmark)	Gold	45,000^{‡}
Italy (FIMI)	Platinum	50,000^{‡}
Mexico (AMPROFON)	Platinum	60,000^{‡}
New Zealand (RMNZ)	Platinum	30,000^{‡}
Poland (ZPAV)	2× Platinum	40,000^{‡}
Spain (Promusicae)	Gold	30,000^{‡}
Sweden (GLF)	Gold	20,000^{‡}
United Kingdom (BPI)	Platinum	600,000^{‡}
United States (RIAA)	Platinum	1,000,000^{‡}
^{‡} Sales+streaming figures based on certification alone.
