= Bird Set Free =

2015 promotional single by Sia

Promotional single by Sia

from the album This Is Acting
- Released: 4 November 2015
- Studio: Echo Studios (Los Angeles, CA)
- Genre: Power pop
- Length: 4:15
- Label: Inertia
- Songwriters: Sia Furler; Greg Kurstin
- Producer: Greg Kurstin

Sia promotional singles chronology
"Salted Wound" (2015)	"Bird Set Free" (2015)	"One Million Bullets" (2016)

Audio video
- Bird Set Free on YouTube

"Bird Set Free" is a song recorded by Sia for her seventh studio album This Is Acting (2016). It was released as the first promotional single from the album on 4 November 2015.

== Background ==
In an interview with Rolling Stone, Sia said that the song was written for Pitch Perfect 2 soundtrack, but they rejected it in favour of "Flashlight". Afterwards she pitched it to Rihanna, who rejected it, then to Adele, who initially recorded it for her album 25, but later decided to let Sia keep it.

== Composition ==
"Bird Set Free" is a piano-based power ballad written in the key of F minor.

== Critical reception ==
Rolling Stone said the song is "liberating". In a review of the song's parent album This Is Acting, Kathy Iandolf of Idolator wrote "This album is dark, indicated by the lead single 'Alive,' but also by the opener 'Bird Set Free,' where Sia takes a solemn vow to emotional liberation amidst strong piano keys." Alex McCown of The A.V. Club called it the "best female empowerment sing-along Katy Perry never wrote." Calling the song a "ginormo self-empowerment anthem", Hugh Montgomory of The Independent wrote "Sia produces something more complex, battle-cries from a volatile soul."

== Promotion ==
Sia performed "Bird Set Free" and "Alive" on the 7 November 2015 episode of Saturday Night Live.

== Personnel ==
- Sia Furler – vocals, songwriting
- Greg Kurstin – songwriting, production, engineering
- Jamie Wosk – additional studio production
- Alex Pasco – engineering
- Julian Burg – engineering
- Manny Marroquin – mixing engineering
- Chris Galland – assistant engineering
- Ike Schultz – assistant engineering
- Emily Lazar – mastering engineering

== Usage in media ==
"Bird Set Free" was featured over the end credits of the horror film The Shallows. It was also featured in the opening credits of the 2017 film Unforgettable.

== Charts ==
Chart (2015–16)	Peak position
Australia (ARIA)	36
Canada Hot 100 (Billboard)	98
Czech Republic Singles Digital (ČNS IFPI)	69
France (SNEP)	49
New Zealand Heatseekers (Recorded Music NZ)	9
Slovakia Singles Digital (ČNS IFPI)	65
Sweden Heatseeker (Sverigetopplistan)	13
Switzerland (Schweizer Hitparade)	69
UK Singles (OCC)	92

== Certifications ==
Region	Certification	Certified units/sales
Italy (FIMI)	Gold	25,000^{‡}
New Zealand (RMNZ)	Gold	15,000^{‡}
Poland (ZPAV)	Gold	25,000^{‡}
United Kingdom (BPI)	Silver	200,000^{‡}
United States (RIAA)	Platinum	1,000,000^{‡}
^{‡} Sales+streaming figures based on certification alone.
