= Oliver Kraus =

- Born: 1970 (age 55–56); Shepherd's Bush, London, England
- Occupations: Musician, arranger, composer
- Instruments: Cello, piano, viola, violin
- Website: oliverkraus.com

Oliver Kraus (born 1970 in Shepherd's Bush, London) is an English musician best known for his work as a cellist and string arranger/ producer and composer for film and television.

== String arrangements and performance ==
Kraus has performed with numerous international artists, both on tour and in studio. As an arranger, he has written, arranged and performed strings for many artists including:

- Dave Matthews' No.1 album Come Tomorrow
- Adele's No 1 Grammy-winning album 25
- Beth Orton's album Trailer Park
- Sia's album Some People Have Real Problems
- Ash's album Free All Angels
- Tom McRae, multiple albums
- Duffy's debut album, Rockferry
- Christina Aguilera's No.1 album Bionic and Golden Globe nominated song from the film Burlesque, "Bound to You" from the Burlesque soundtrack
- Sara Bareilles & Ingrid Michaelson, Pink, Florence and the Machine, Colbie Caillat & Gavin Degraw, Tom McRae, Lukas Nelson, Joshua Radin, Cary Brothers, Lenka, Tracey Thorn, James Blunt, Rachael Yamagata, Jake Bugg, Paloma Faith, Joy Williams, Christina Perri, Alexi Murdoch, Jay Brannan, Ry Cuming, Bell X1, Christina Aguilera, Gomez, Dan Wilson, Colin Hay, Lifehouse, Liz Phair, Mandy Moore, Marc Almond, Meiko, My Life Story, Kristina Train, The View, The Weepies, Thea Gilmore, Priscilla Ahn, Brandon Jenner, Tyler Hilton, Hanson and Ben Ottewell, among other artists
- Full Credits on Allmusic.com

== Film and television ==
As a composer, Kraus has written music for film and television with frequent collaboration with Sia and The Cure drummer Jason Cooper.

=== Film and soundtrack ===
- Fifty Shades Freed, dir. James Foley, Song "Helium" Produced and Arranged for Sia Furler 2018
- You, Me and Gasoline dir. Jenna A Rice, Co-written with Joel Shearer 2017
- Fifty Shades Darker, dir. James Foley, Song "Deer in Headlights" Produced and Arranged for Sia Furler 2017
- Finding Dory dir. Andrew Stanton, Song "Unforgettable' Arranged, Produced and Conducted for Sia Furler 2016
- Bad Santa 2 dir. Mark Waters, Song "(There's No Place Like) Home for the Holidays" Co-Produced with John Alagia, singer Joy Williams 2016
- San Andreas dir. Brad Peyton, Song 'California Dreaming' Produced for Sia Furler 2015
- Fifty Shades Of Grey dir. Sam Taylor-Johnson, Song 'Salted Wound' Co-Written and Produced for Sia Furler 2015
- The Great Gatsby, dir. Baz Luhrmann, song Kill and Run Produced and Arranged for Sia Furler, 2013
- Without Gorky dir. Cosima Spender, Score Co-Written with Jason Cooper and Matteo Cipollina 2012
- Twilight Eclipse dir. David Slade, song ‘My Love’ co-written and Produced with Sia Furler, 2010
- From Within, dir. Phedon Papamichael, 2008 Music Score co-written and Produced with Jason Cooper, winner of Grand Jury Award for Best Music Score at the Solstice Film Festival
- Joybells, dir. Mike Hawley, Music score written and produced. 2007
- Stanley, dir. Mike Hawley, Music score written and produced 2007
- The Power of the Game, dir. Michael Apted, 2007 cues written for score.
- Spiderhole, dir. Daniel Simpson, Music score co-written and Produced with Jason Cooper, 2009
- The Uninvited, dir. Daniel Simpson, Music score co-written and Produced with Jason Cooper, 1999
- ‘h’ dir, Daniel Simpson, Music score co-written and Produced with Jason Cooper, 1995
- Handle with Care, dir, Alexis Bowler & Sandy Hunt, WWF, Co-written with Antony Wilkins & Miriam Kaufman. Awards: Winner Best Children's Program at Chicago International Children's Film Festival; New England Children's Film festival; British Animation Week, National Film Theatre, London; Edinburgh International Film Festival

=== Television ===
Kraus has worked with the BBC's Documentary department scoring music for a number of series including 7 episodes of BBC1's ‘Macintyre Investigates’ featuring BAFTA-nominated investigative reporter Donal Macintyre, 12 episodes of BBC1's ‘Whistleblowers’ series, and BBC1's flagship documentary series ‘Panorama’. He teamed up again with writing partner Jason Cooper to score music for the BBC Wildlife Documentary series ‘Natural World," working with Simon King on several documentary films.

==== Selected credits ====
- Meerkats, Natural World, BBC 2, 2003
- What's the Big Idea, Series, Discovery Channel, 2004
- Cheetahs, Natural World, BBC 2, 2005
- The Battle with my Brain, Dispatches, C4, 2005
- Toki's Tale, Natural World, BBC 2, 2007
- Macintyre Investigates, Series, BBC 1, 2002-3
- Whistleblowers, Series, BBC 1, 2004-6
- Dogfighting, Panorama, BBC 1, 2007

== Original composition ==
- Oliver Kraus, Sound Bites
