= Big Girls Cry =

Single by Sia

from the album 1000 Forms of Fear
- Released: 25 June 2014
- Recorded: 2013
- Studio: Magical Thinking Studios (Los Angeles, CA); Echo Studios (Los Angeles, CA)
- Genre: Pop
- Length: 3:31
- Label: Monkey Puzzle; RCA
- Songwriter(s): Sia Furler; Christopher Braide
- Producer(s): Greg Kurstin

Sia singles chronology
"Chandelier" (2014)	"Big Girls Cry" (2014)	"Guts Over Fear" (2014)

Music video
- "Big Girls Cry" on YouTube

"Big Girls Cry" is a single by Australian singer-songwriter Sia, from her sixth studio album 1000 Forms of Fear (2014). The single was not totally released internationally; it was only released in Australia and some parts of Europe. It charted in Belgium and hit the top 40 in Australia and France.

Electronic duo Odesza released a "choppy, chillwave" remix of "Big Girls Cry" on 5 December 2014. On 15 October 2014, Sia performed the song at The Recording Academy. On 2 April 2015, "Big Girls Cry" was released as the third single in the United Kingdom. Sia performed it live on Australian television show Sunrise on 21 April 2015.

== Music video ==
On 2 April 2015, a video for the song was released on Sia's Vevo YouTube channel. The video features Maddie Ziegler facing the camera using her hands and face to express emotions. At one point a pair of hands come into the frame (shown in behind-the-scenes footage to be Sia's own hands) manipulating Ziegler's face and covering her mouth, they appear to lift Ziegler by the throat into the air until only her kicking feet are shown, then Ziegler drops back into the frame to resume her emotive facial contortions. The single shot video with various lighting and a plain black background is comparable to Lorde's "Tennis Court".

As of June 2022, the video had received more than 300 million views. Since mid 2018, the video has not been available for viewers in Australia and New Zealand.

== Charts ==
=== Weekly charts ===
Weekly chart performance for "Big Girls Cry"
Chart (2014–15)	Peak position
Australia (ARIA)	16
Belgium (Ultratip Bubbling Under Flanders)	54
Belgium (Ultratop 50 Wallonia)	29
Canada (Canadian Hot 100)	64
France (SNEP)	18
France Airplay (SNEP)	8
Iceland (RÚV)	17
Ireland (IRMA)	60
Israel (Media Forest)	7
Scotland (OCC)	51
Sweden Heatseeker (Sverigetopplistan)	15
UK Singles (OCC)	77
US Bubbling Under Hot 100 (Billboard)	3

=== Year-end charts ===
2014 year-end chart performance for "Big Girls Cry"
Chart (2014)	Position
France (SNEP)	100

2015 year-end chart performance for "Big Girls Cry"
Chart (2015)	Position
Australian Artist Singles (ARIA)	16
France (SNEP)	113

== Certifications ==
Certifications and sales for "Big Girls Cry"
Region	Certification	Certified units/sales
Australia (ARIA)	Platinum	70,000^{^}
Canada (Music Canada)	Gold	40,000^{‡}
Denmark (IFPI Danmark)	Gold	45,000^{‡}
New Zealand (RMNZ)	Gold	7,500^{*}
United Kingdom (BPI)	Silver	200,000^{‡}
United States (RIAA)	Gold	500,000^{‡}
^{*} Sales figures based on certification alone.^{^} Shipments figures based on certification alone.^{‡} Sales+streaming figures based on certification alone.

== Release history ==
Release dates for "Big Girls Cry"
Region	Date	Format	Label
Belgium	25 June 2014	Digital download	Monkey Puzzle; RCA
Finland	25 June 2014	Digital download	Monkey Puzzle; RCA
Portugal	25 June 2014	Digital download	Monkey Puzzle; RCA
Spain	25 June 2014	Digital download	Monkey Puzzle; RCA
Sweden	25 June 2014	Digital download	Monkey Puzzle; RCA
Switzerland	25 June 2014	Digital download	Monkey Puzzle; RCA
France	27 April 2015	Digital download (Remix EP)	Monkey Puzzle; RCA
United States	28 April 2015	Digital download (Remix EP)	Monkey Puzzle; RCA
United Kingdom	4 May 2015	Digital download (Remix EP)	Monkey Puzzle; RCA
United Kingdom	4 May 2015	Mainstream radio	Monkey Puzzle; RCA
