= List of songs recorded by Sia =

Songs recorded by Sia
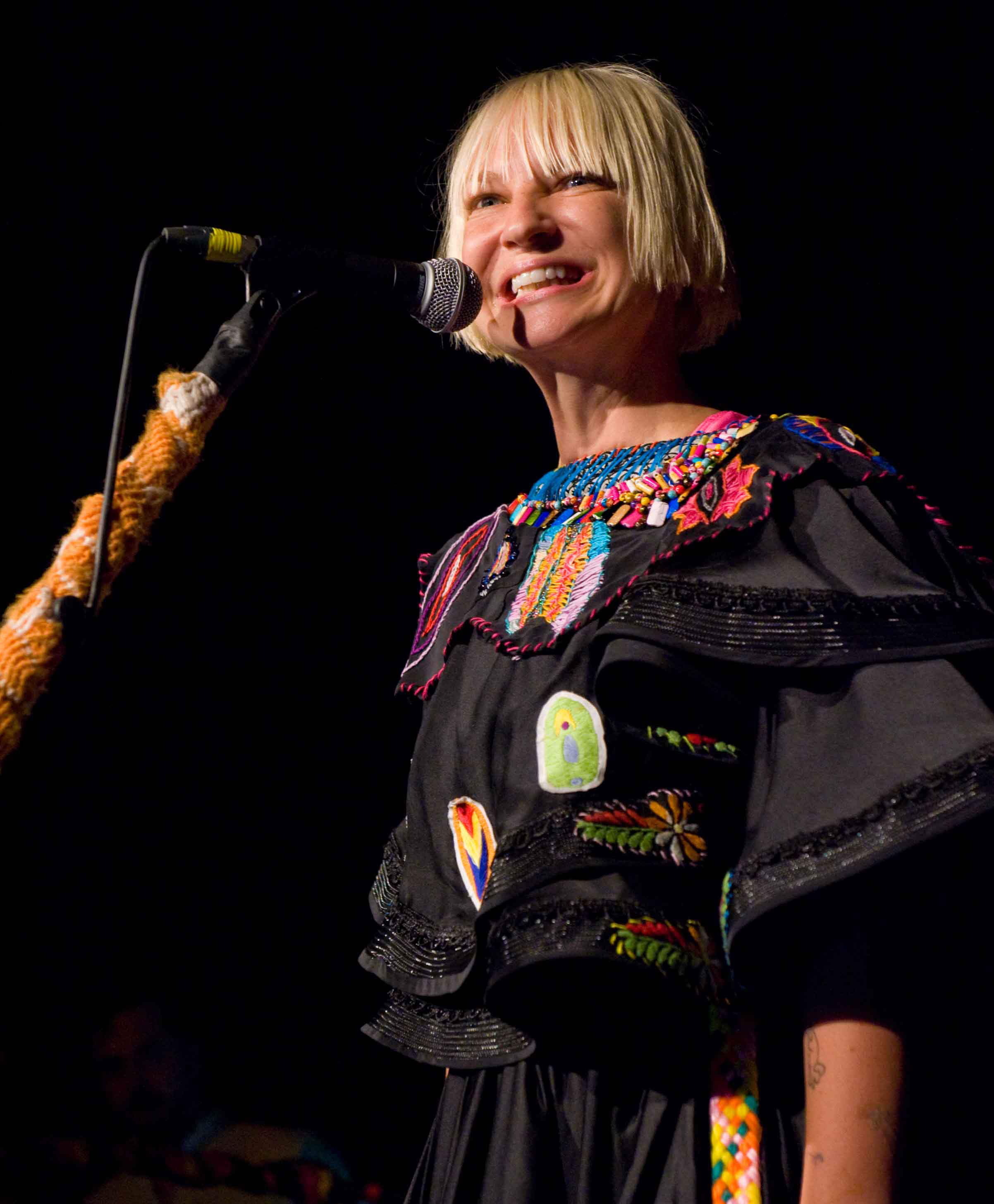
- Sia performing in Seattle in 2011
- Released songs: 228

In 1997, Australian singer-songwriter Sia released her debut studio album, entitled OnlySee. She released her second album, Healing Is Difficult, in 2001. The album yielded three singles: "Taken for Granted", "Little Man" and "Drink to Get Drunk". Sia was also part of English band Zero 7, and performed vocals on their albums in the early 2000s; she left the group in Late 2006.

In 2004, Sia released her third studio album, Colour the Small One. Its singles included "Don't Bring Me Down", "Breathe Me", "Where I Belong", "Sunday", and "Numb". In 2008, her fourth studio album, Some People Have Real Problems, was released. The album spawned four singles: "Day Too Soon", "The Girl You Lost to Cocaine", "Soon We'll Be Found" and "Buttons". Its follow-up, We Are Born, was made available in 2010 and spawned the singles "You've Changed", "Clap Your Hands", "Bring Night" and "I'm in Here".

In 2011, Sia was featured on the successful singles "Titanium" by David Guetta and "Wild Ones" by Flo Rida. In 2013, she contributed the song "Elastic Heart" to the soundtrack of the 2013 American film The Hunger Games: Catching Fire. A year later, she released her sixth, breakthrough studio album, 1000 Forms of Fear. Four singles were released from it: "Chandelier", "Big Girls Cry", Sia's solo version of "Elastic Heart", and "Fire Meet Gasoline".

Sia's seventh album, This Is Acting, was released on 29 January 2016. It generated the singles "Alive", her first Billboard Hot 100-topping hit "Cheap Thrills" (solo or featuring Sean Paul), "The Greatest", "Move Your Body", "Reaper" (in Australia), and "Unstoppable" (in 2022). Sia left RCA Records and signed with Atlantic Records in 2017; she released Everyday Is Christmas, her first album with the label, in November of that year. It was re-released with new bonus tracks in three following years (2018, 2021, and twice in 2022). In 2018, she formed LSD, a supergroup with Labrinth and Diplo; their debut album was released in April 2019 and included the singles "Genius", "Audio", "Thunderclouds", "Mountains" and "No New Friends".

Sia's ninth studio album Music – Songs from and Inspired by the Motion Picture was released on 12 February 2021. It spawned the singles "Together", "Courage to Change", "Hey Boy" (solo or featuring Burna Boy) and "Floating Through Space" (with David Guetta). Her tenth studio album, Reasonable Woman, was released on 3 May 2024, and features the singles "Gimme Love" and "Dance Alone".

Sia has recorded and released collaborations with many artists, including Eminem, Wiz Khalifa, Leslie Odom Jr., Angel Haze, Beck, Lior, Giorgio Moroder, Ozuna, Zayn Malik, Doja Cat, BTS, Barney McAll, Gims, Brooke Candy, Miley Cyrus, Diljit Dosanjh, Kylie Minogue, and Kanye West.

== Released songs ==
Key
| † | Indicates single release |
| ‡ | Indicates song included on an alternative version of the album |
| * | Indicates song included as a b-side on the single |

| Title | Artist(s) | Writer(s) | Album | Year | Ref |
|---|---|---|---|---|---|
| "1+1" | Sia | Sia Furler; Jesse Shatkin | Music – Songs from and Inspired by the Motion Picture | 2021 | |
| "2 Minutes 'Til New Years" | Sia | Sia Furler; Jesse Shatkin; Erick Serna | Everyday Is Christmas ‡ | 2022 | |
| "3 Minutes 'Til New Years" | Sia | Sia Furler; Jesse Shatkin; Erick Serna | Everyday Is Christmas ‡ | 2022 | |
| "12 Nights" | Sia | Sia Furler; Jesse Shatkin; Erick Serna | Everyday Is Christmas ‡ | 2022 | |
| "A Situation" | Sia | Jesse Flavell | OnlySee | 1997 | |
| "Academia" | Sia | Sia Furler; Dan Carey | Some People Have Real Problems | 2008 | |
| "Alive" † | Sia | Sia Furler; Adele Adkins; Tobias Jesso Jr. | This Is Acting | 2016 | |
| "Angel by the Wings" † | Sia | Sia Furler; Greg Kurstin | The Eagle Huntress | 2016 | |
| "Angel in Your Eyes" | LSD (Labrinth, Sia and Diplo) | Sia Furler; Timothy McKenzie; Thomas Wesley Pentz | LSD | 2019 | |
| "Asrep Onosim" | Sia | Sia Furler; Jesse Flavell | OnlySee | 1997 | |
| "Audio" † | LSD (Labrinth, Sia and Diplo) | Sia Furler; Timothy McKenzie; Thomas Wesley Pentz; Henry Agincourt Allen; Philip Meckseper | LSD | 2018 | |
| "Bang My Head" † | David Guetta featuring Sia and Fetty Wap | David Guetta; Giorgio Tuinfort; Marcus van Wattum; Christian Karlsson; Sia Furler; Vincent Pontare; Magnus Lidehäll | Listen Again | 2014 | |
| "Battle Cry" † | Angel Haze featuring Sia | Angel Haze; Sia Furler; Greg Kurstin | Dirty Gold | 2013 | |
| "Be Good to Me" | Sia | Sia Furler; Jesse Graham; Simon Katz | We Are Born | 2010 | |
| "Beautiful Calm Driving" | Sia | Sia Furler; Samuel Dixon | Some People Have Real Problems | 2008 | |
| "Beautiful Pain" | Eminem featuring Sia | Marshall Mathers; Emile Haynie; Sia Furler; Luis Resto | The Marshall Mathers LP 2 ‡ | 2013 | |
| "Beautiful People" | Wiz Khalifa featuring Sia | Sia Furler; Tor Erik Hermansen; Mikkel Eriksen | Non-album single | 2013 | |
| "Beautiful Reality" | Sia | Jesse Flavell | OnlySee | 1997 | |
| "Beautiful Things Can Happen" | Sia | Sia Furler; Matt Corby | Music – Songs from and Inspired by the Motion Picture | 2021 | |
| "Big Girl, Little Girl" | Sia | Sia Furler; Henry Binns | We Are Born | 2010 | |
| "Big Girls Cry" † | Sia | Sia Furler; Christopher Braide | 1000 Forms of Fear | 2014 | |
| "Bird Set Free" † | Sia | Sia Furler; Greg Kurstin | This Is Acting | 2016 | |
| "Blackbird" | Sia | John Lennon; Paul McCartney | Beat Bugs – Music From the Original Series: Season 1, V.2 | 2016 | |
| "Blame It on the Radio" | Sia | Sia Furler; Dan Carey | The Girl You Lost to Cocaine * | 2008 | |
| "Blow It All Away" | Sia | Sia Furler; Blair MacKichan; Felix Howard; Kevin Armstrong | Healing Is Difficult | 2001 | |
| "Born Yesterday" † | Arca featuring Sia | Sia Furler; Alejandra Ghersi; Jeremy Michael Coleman | Kick II | 2021 | |
| "Breathe Me" † | Sia | Sia Furler; Dan Carey | Colour the Small One | 2004 | |
| "Bring It to Me" | Sia | Sia Furler | Soon We'll Be Found * | 2008 | |
| "Bring Night" † | Sia | Sia Furler; Lauren Flax | We Are Born | 2010 | |
| "Broken Biscuit" | Sia | Sia Furler; Chad Fischer | Colour the Small One ‡ | 2003 | |
| "Broken Glass" | Sia | Sia Furler; Jesse Shatkin; Jasper Leak | This Is Acting | 2016 | |
| "The Bully" | Sia | Sia Furler; Bek David Campbel; Jimmy Hogarth | Colour the Small One | 2004 | |
| "Burn the Pages" | Sia | Sia Furler; Greg Kurstin | 1000 Forms of Fear | 2014 | |
| "Butterflies" | Sia | Sia Furler; Jimmy Hogarth; Kevin Cormack | Colour the Small One ‡ | 2004 | |
| "Buttons" † | Sia | Sia Furler; Samuel Dixon | Some People Have Real Problems ‡ | 2008 | |
| "California Dreamin'" | Sia | John Phillips; Michelle Phillips | San Andreas - Original Motion Picture Soundtrack | 2015 | |
| "Candy Cane Lane" | Sia | Sia Furler; Greg Kurstin | Everyday Is Christmas | 2017 | |
| "Cares at the Door" | Sia | Sia Furler; Samuel Dixon | Some People Have Real Problems ‡ | 2008 | |
| "Cellophane" | Sia | Sia Furler; Greg Kurstin | 1000 Forms of Fear | 2014 | |
| "Chandelier" † | Sia | Sia Furler; Jesse Shatkin | 1000 Forms of Fear | 2014 | |
| "Cheap Thrills" † | Sia featuring Sean Paul | Sia Furler; Greg Kurstin | This Is Acting | 2016 | |
| "The Church of What's Happening Now" | Sia | Sia Furler; Samuel Dixon | Colour the Small One | 2006 | |
| "Clap Your Hands" † | Sia | Sia Furler; Samuel Dixon | We Are Born | 2010 | |
| "Cloud" | Sia | Sia Furler; Samuel Dixon | We Are Born | 2010 | |
| "The Co-Dependent" | Sia | Sia Furler; Greg Kurstin | We Are Born | 2010 | |
| "Cold" † | Leslie Odom Jr. featuring Sia | Leslie Odom Jr. Rafael Casal; Sam Ashworth; Tommy King | Non-album single | 2020 | |
| "Confetti" | Sia | Sia Furler; Christopher Braide | This Is Acting ‡ | 2016 | |
| "Courage to Change" † | Sia | Sia Furler; Greg Kurstin; Alecia Moore | Music – Songs from and Inspired by the Motion Picture | 2020 | |
| "Dance Alone" † | Sia and Kylie Minogue | Sia Furler; Jesse Shatkin | Reasonable Woman | 2024 | |
| "The Day That You Moved On" † | TQX featuring Sia | Sia Furler; Barney McAll | Global Intimacy | 2017 | |
| "Day Too Soon" † | Sia | Sia Furler; Samuel Dixon | Some People Have Real Problems | 2008 | |
| "Death by Chocolate" | Sia | Sia Furler; Greg Kurstin | Some People Have Real Problems | 2008 | |
| "Deer in Headlights" | Sia | Sia Furler; Samuel Dixon | Fifty Shades Freed: Original Motion Picture Soundtrack | 2018 | |
| "Déjà Vu" † | Giorgio Moroder featuring Sia | Giorgio Moroder; Sia Furler | Déjà Vu | 2015 | |
| "Del Mar" † | Ozuna, Doja Cat and Sia | Sia Furler; Juan Carlos Ozuna; Amala Dlamini; Yazid Antonio Rivera; Starlin Rivas Rivera; Jose Cotto; José Aponte Santi; Jesse Shatkin; Eli Xavier Vargas; Donny Flores; Alexis Gotay | ENOC | 2020 | |
| "Destiny" † | Zero 7 featuring Sia and Sophie Barker | Sia Furler; Sophie Barker; Henry Binns; Sam Hardaker | Simple Things | 2001 | |
| "Diamond Eyes" | Eddie Benjamin featuring Sia | Sia Furler; Jesse Shatkin; Eddie Benjamin | Emotional | 2021 | |
| "Dim the Lights" | Creep featuring Sia | Sia Furler; Lauren Flax; Lauren Dillard; Kevin Malpass | Echoes | 2013 | |
| "Distractions" | Zero 7 featuring Sia | Sia Furler; Henry Binns; Sam Hardaker | Simple Things | 2001 | |
| "Don't Bring Me Down" † | Sia | Sia Furler; Blair MacKichan | Colour the Small One | 2003 | |
| "Don't Get Me Started" | Sia | Sia Furler; Jesse Flavell | OnlySee | 1997 | |
| "Don't Give Up" † | Sam I featuring Sia, Busta Rhymes and Vic Mensa | André Laudz; Jose Henrique Pinheiro; Sam Spiegel; Sia Furler; Trevor Smith, Jr. Victor Mensah | Random Shit from the Internet Era | 2020 | |
| "Dragging You Around" † | Greg Laswell featuring Sia | Greg Laswell | Landline | 2012 | |
| "Dreaming" | Zero 7 featuring Sia | Sia Furler; Henry Binns; Sam Hardaker | The Garden | 2006 | |
| "Dressed in Black" | Sia | Sia Furler; Greg Kurstin; Grant Michaels | 1000 Forms of Fear | 2014 | |
| "Drink to Get Drunk" † | Sia vs DifferentGear | Sia Furler; Sam Frank | Healing Is Difficult | 2001 | |
| "Dusk Till Dawn" † | Zayn featuring Sia | Zayn Malik; Sia Furler; Greg Kurstin | Non-album single | 2017 | |
| "Dynamite" | Sean Paul featuring Sia | Sia Furler; Sean Paul; Greg Kurstin; Raymond Zacharie Alexandre; Yannick Rastogi; Nyann Raymond Lodge | Scorcha | 2021 | |
| "Elastic Heart" † | Sia featuring The Weeknd and Diplo | Sia Furler; Thomas Wesley Pentz; Andrew Swanson; Abel Tesfaye | 1000 Forms of Fear and The Hunger Games: Catching Fire – Original Motion Picture Soundtrack | 2014 | |
| "Electric Bird" | Sia | Sia Furler; Henry Binns | Some People Have Real Problems | 2008 | |
| "Everyday Is Christmas" | Sia | Sia Furler; Greg Kurstin | Everyday Is Christmas | 2017 | |
| "Eye of the Needle" | Sia | Sia Furler; Christopher Braide | 1000 Forms of Fear | 2014 | |
| "Eye to Eye" | Sia | Sia Furler; Jesse Shatkin | Music – Songs from and Inspired by the Motion Picture | 2021 | |
| "Exhale" † | Kenzie featuring Sia | Casey Smith; Marcus Lomax; Mark Williams; Raul Cubina | Non-album single | 2020 | |
| "Fair Game" | Sia | Sia Furler; Greg Kurstin | 1000 Forms of Fear | 2014 | |
| "Fear" | Sia | Sia Furler | Healing Is Difficult | 2001 | |
| "The Fight" | Sia | Sia Furler; Dan Carey | We Are Born | 2010 | |
| "Fire Meet Gasoline" † | Sia | Sia Furler; Sam Dixon; Greg Kurstin | 1000 Forms of Fear | 2014 | |
| "Firefly" | Barney McAll featuring Sia and Invenio Choir | Sia Furler; Barney McAll | Graft | 2012 | |
| "Fist Fighting a Sandstorm" | Sia | Sia Furler; Jesse Shatkin | This Is Acting ‡ | 2016 | |
| "Flames"† | David Guetta and Sia | David Guetta; Sia Furler; Christopher Braide; Giorgio Tuinfort; Marcus van Wattum | 7 | 2018 | |
| "Floating Through Space" † | Sia and David Guetta | Sia Furler; Greg Kurstin | Music – Songs from and Inspired by the Motion Picture | 2021 | |
| "Fly Me to the Moon" | Sia | Bart Howard | Non-album single | 2021 | |
| "Footprints" | Sia | Sia Furler; Tyler Williams; Josh Valle; Nikhil Seetharam | This Is Acting | 2016 | |
| "Free Me" | Sia | Sia Furler; Lucian Piane; Oliver Kraus | Non-album single | 2017 | |
| "Free the Animal" | Sia | Sia Furler; Jasper Leak; Greg Kurstin | 1000 Forms of Fear | 2014 | |
| "Genius" † | LSD (Labrinth, Sia and Diplo) | Sia Furler; Timothy McKenzie; Thomas Wesley Pentz; Philip Meckseper | LSD | 2018 | |
| "Get Me" | Sia | Sia Furler; Sam Frank | Healing Is Difficult | 2001 | |
| "Golden" † | Travie McCoy featuring Sia | Travie McCoy; Sia Furler; Thomas Wesley | Rough Water | 2015 | |
| "Gimme Love" † | Sia | Sia Furler; Jesse Shatkin | Reasonable Woman | 2023 | |
| "The Girl You Lost to Cocaine" † | Sia | Sia Furler; Rob Allum; Phil Marten; Eddie Myer | Some People Have Real Problems | 2008 | |
| "The Greatest" † | Sia featuring Kendrick Lamar | Sia Furler; Greg Kurstin | This Is Acting ‡ | 2016 | |
| "Guts Over Fear" † | Eminem featuring Sia | Eminem; Luis Resto; Emile Haynie; John Hill; Sia Furler | Shady XV | 2014 | |
| "Hass Hass" † | Diljit Dosanjh and Sia | Sia Furler; Diljit Dosanjh; Greg Kurstin; Inder Bajwa | Non-album single | 2023 | |
| "Healing is Difficult" | Sia | Sia Furler; Sam Frank | Healing Is Difficult | 2001 | |
| "Heaven Can Wait" | LSD (Labrinth, Sia and Diplo) | Sia Furler; Timothy McKenzie; Thomas Wesley Pentz; Philip Meckseper | LSD | 2019 | |
| "Helium" | Sia | Sia Furler; Chris Braide | Fifty Shades Darker - Original Motion Picture Soundtrack | 2017 | |
| "Here I Am" † | Dolly Parton and Sia | Dolly Parton | Dumplin' - Original Motion Picture Soundtrack | 2018 | |
| "Hey Boy" † | Sia | Sia Furler; Jesse Shatkin; Kamille | Music – Songs from and Inspired by the Motion Picture | 2020 | |
| "Ho Ho Ho" | Sia | Sia Furler; Greg Kurstin | Everyday Is Christmas | 2017 | |
| "Hold Me Down" | Sia | Sia Furler; Dan Carey | We Are Born ‡ | 2010 | |
| "Hostage" | Sia | Sia Furler; Nick Valensi | 1000 Forms of Fear | 2014 | |
| "House on Fire" | Sia | Sia Furler; Jack Antonoff | This Is Acting | 2016 | |
| "How to Breathe" | Sia | Sia Furler | How to Breathe (EP) | 1997 | |
| "I Don't Want to Want You" | Sia | Sia Furler; Jesse Flavell | OnlySee | 1997 | |
| "I Go to Sleep" | Sia | Ray Davies | Some People Have Real Problems | 2008 | |
| "I Love It" † | Hilltop Hoods featuring Sia | Matthew Lambert; Daniel Smith; Ben John Hare; A. Schefrin; Sia Furler | Drinking from the Sun | 2012 | |
| "I'll Forget You" | Lior featuring Sia | Lior Attar; Ben Fink | Corner of an Endless Road | 2008 | |
| "I'm in Here" | Sia | Sia Furler; Samuel Dixon | We Are Born | 2010 | |
| "I'm Not Important to You" | Sia | Sia Furler; Sam Frank | Healing Is Difficult | 2001 | |
| "I'm Still Here" † | Sia | Sia Furler; Jesse Shatkin | Music – Songs from and Inspired by the Motion Picture ‡ | 2018 | |
| "If I Can't Have You" | Zero 7 featuring Sia | Sia Furler; Henry Binns; Sam Hardaker; Dedi Madden | The Garden | 2006 | |
| "Insidiously" | Sia | Sia Furler; Sam Frank | Healing Is Difficult | 2001 | |
| "It's Time" | LSD (Labrinth, Sia and Diplo) | Sia Furler; Timothy McKenzie; Thomas Wesley Pentz | LSD | 2019 | |
| "Je te pardonne" † | Maître Gims featuring Sia | Maître Gims; Renaud Rebillaud; Sia Furler | Mon cœur avait raison | 2015 | |
| "Jesus Wept" | Sia | Sia Furler; Samuel Dixon | This Is Acting ‡ | 2016 | |
| "Judge Me" | Sia | Sia Furler; Sam Frank | Healing Is Difficult | 2001 | |
| "Kill and Run" | Sia | Sia Furler; Chris Braide | The Great Gatsby – Original Motion Picture Soundtrack | 2013 | |
| "Lentil" | Sia | Sia Furler; Samuel Dixon | Some People Have Real Problems | 2008 | |
| "Let's Love" † | David Guetta and Sia | David Guetta; Sia Furler; Giorgio Tuinfort; Marcus van Wattum | TBA | 2020 | |
| "Lie to Me" | Sia | Sia Furler; Jesse Shatkin | Music – Songs from and Inspired by the Motion Picture | 2021 | |
| "Light Headed" | David Guetta and Sia | David Guetta; Sia Furler; Christopher Braide; Tor Erik Hermansen; Mikkel Eriksen; Boris "Netsky" Daenen | 7 | 2018 | |
| "Like a River Runs" | Bleachers featuring Sia | Jack Antonoff; John Hill | Terrible Thrills, Vol. 2 | 2015 | |
| "Little Black Sandals" | Sia | Sia Furler; Dan Carey | Some People Have Real Problems | 2008 | |
| "Little Man" † | Sia | Sia Furler; Sam Frank | Healing Is Difficult | 2001 | |
| "Living Out Loud" † | Brooke Candy featuring Sia | Sia Furler; Geoffrey Early; Greg Kurstin; Priscilla Hamilton | Non-album single | 2017 | |
| "Lucky" | Sia | Sia Furler; Samuel Dixon | Don't Bring Me Down * | 2003 | |
| "Lullaby" | Sia | Sia Furler; Samuel Dixon | Some People Have Real Problems | 2008 | |
| "Madlove" | Sia | Sia Furler | OnlySee | 1997 | |
| "Magic" | Sia | Sia Furler; Jesse Shatkin | A Wrinkle in Time – Original Motion Picture Soundtrack | 2018 | |
| "Manchild" † | Sia | Neneh Cherry; Cameron McVey; Robert Del Naja | The Versions | 2022 | |
| "Midnight Decisions" | Sia | Sia Furler; Chris Braide | This Is Acting ‡ | 2016 | |
| "Miracle" | Sia | Sia Furler; Jesse Shatkin | Music – Songs from and Inspired by the Motion Picture | 2021 | |
| "Moon" | Sia | Sia Furler; Samuel Dixon; Jimmy Hogarth | Colour the Small One | 2004 | |
| "Moonquake Lake" | Sia and Beck | Sia Furler; Greg Kurstin; Will Gluck | Annie (2014) – Original Motion Picture Soundtrack | 2014 | |
| "Mountains" † | LSD (Labrinth, Sia and Diplo) | Sia Furler; Timothy McKenzie; Thomas Wesley Pentz | LSD | 2018 | |
| "Move Your Body" † | Sia | Sia Furler; Greg Kurstin | This Is Acting | 2016 | |
| "Muddy Feet" | Miley Cyrus featuring Sia | Sia Furler; Miley Cyrus; Jesse Shatkin; Michael Pollack; Michael Len Williams II; Bibi Bourelly; Gregory "Aldae" Hein; Jesse Van der Meulen; David Frank; Steve Kipner; Pam Sheyne | Endless Summer Vacation | 2023 | |
| "Music" | Sia | Sia Furler; Chris Braide | Music – Songs from and Inspired by the Motion Picture | 2021 | |
| "My Love" | Sia | Sia Furler; Oliver Kraus | The Twilight Saga: Eclipse – Original Motion Picture Soundtrack | 2010 | |
| "My Old Santa Claus" | Sia | Sia Furler; Greg Kurstin | Everyday Is Christmas ‡ | 2017 | |
| "Naughty & Nice" | Sia | Sia Furler; Jesse Shatkin | Everyday Is Christmas ‡ | 2022 | |
| "Natale's Song" | Sia | Sia Furler; Samuel Dixon | Colour the Small One | 2004 | |
| "Never Give Up" † | Sia | Sia Furler; Greg Kurstin | Lion – Original Motion Picture Soundtrack | 2016 | |
| "Never So Big" | David Byrne and Fatboy Slim featuring Sia | David Byrne; Norman Cook | Here Lies Love | 2015 | |
| "No New Friends" † | LSD (Labrinth, Sia and Diplo) | Sia Furler; Timothy McKenzie; Thomas Wesley Pentz; Henry Agincourt Allen; Philip Meckseper | LSD | 2019 | |
| "Numb" † | Sia | Sia Furler; Felix Howard; James McMillan | Colour the Small One | 2004 | |
| "Oakland Nights" | The Lonely Island featuring Sia | Vincent van den Ende; Nathaniel Motte; Andrew Samberg; Akiva Schaffer | The Unauthorized Bash Brothers Experience | 2019 | |
| "Oblivion" (Note: "Oblivion" was originally released as a single from Labrinth's 2019 album Imagination & the Misfit Kid as Labrinth featuring Sia, though was re-recorded for Sia's 2021 album Music – Songs from and Inspired by the Motion Picture as Sia featuring Labrinth.) | Sia featuring Labrinth | Sia Furler; Timothy McKenzie | Music – Songs from and Inspired by the Motion Picture, Imagination & the Misfit Kid | 2019 and 2021 | |
| "Oh Father" | Sia | Madonna Ciccone; Patrick Leonard | We Are Born | 2010 | |
| "On" † | BTS featuring Sia | Antonina Armato; August Rigo; J-Hope; Julia Ross; Krysta Youngs; Melanie Fontana; Michel Schulz; Pdogg; RM; Suga | Map of the Soul: 7 | 2020 | |
| "One Candle" | J. Ralph featuring Sia | J. Ralph; Sia Furler | Racing Extinction – Original Motion Picture Soundtrack | 2015 | |
| "One Million Bullets" | Sia | Sia Furler; Jesse Shatkin | This Is Acting | 2016 | |
| "One More Shot" | Sia | Jesse Flavell | OnlySee | 1997 | |
| "OnlySee" | Sia | Jesse Flavell | OnlySee | 1997 | |
| "Opportunity" | Sia | Sia Furler; Greg Kurstin; Will Gluck | Annie (2014) – Original Motion Picture Soundtrack | 2014 | |
| "Original" † | Sia | Sia Furler; Jesse Shatkin; Sean Douglas | Dolittle – Original Motion Picture Soundtrack | 2020 | |
| "The Pageant of the Bizarre" | Zero 7 featuring Sia | Sia Furler; Henry Binns; Sam Hardaker | The Garden | 2006 | |
| "Paranoid Android" | Sia | Colin Greenwood; Jonny Greenwood; Ed O'Brien; Philip Selway; Thom Yorke | Exit Music: Songs with Radio Heads | 2006 | |
| "Pictures" † | Sia | Sia Furler; Dan Carey | Lady Croissant | 2007 | |
| "Pin Drop" | Sia | Sia Furler; Jesse Shatkin | Everyday Is Christmas ‡ | 2021 | |
| "Play Dumb" | Sia | Sia Furler; Jack Antonoff | Music – Songs from and Inspired by the Motion Picture | 2021 | |
| "Playground" | Sia | Sia Furler; Samuel Dixon; Felix Bloxsom | Some People Have Real Problems | 2008 | |
| "Puppies Are Forever" | Sia | Sia Furler; Greg Kurstin | Everyday Is Christmas | 2017 | |
| "Rainbow" † | Sia | Sia Furler; James Vincent Notorleva; Jesse Shatkin | My Little Pony: The Movie (soundtrack) | 2017 | |
| "Reaper" † | Sia | Sia Furler; Kanye West; Noah Goldstein; Charles Misodi Njapa; Dom $olo | This Is Acting | 2016 | |
| "Rewrite" | Sia | Sia Furler; Samuel Dixon | Colour the Small One | 2004 | |
| "Riding on My Bike" | Sia | Sia Furler; Larry Goldings | At Home with the Kids | 2020 | |
| "Round and Round" | Sia | Joe Shapiro; Lou Stallman | Everyday Is Christmas ‡ | 2018 | |
| "Salted Wound" | Sia | Brian West; Gerald Eaton; Sia Furler; Oliver Kraus | Fifty Shades of Grey – Original Motion Picture Soundtrack | 2015 | |
| "Santa Visits Everyone" | Sia | Sia Furler; Jesse Shatkin | Everyday Is Christmas ‡ | 2021 | |
| "Santa's Coming for Us" † | Sia | Sia Furler; Greg Kurstin | Everyday Is Christmas | 2017 | |
| "Satisfied" | Sia featuring Miguel and Queen Latifah | Lin-Manuel Miranda | The Hamilton Mixtape | 2016 | |
| "Saved My Life" † | Sia | Sia Furler; Greg Kurstin; Dua Lipa | Music – Songs from and Inspired by the Motion Picture | 2020 | |
| "Sea Shells" | Sia | Sia Furler; Larry Goldings | Colour the Small One ‡ | 2004 | |
| "Shadow" | Sia | Jesse Flavell | OnlySee | 1997 | |
| "She Wolf (Falling to Pieces)" † | David Guetta featuring Sia | David Guetta; Chris Braide; Sia Furler; Giorgio Tuinfort | Nothing but the Beat 2.0 | 2012 | |
| "Sing for My Life" | Sia | Sia Furler; Greg Kurstin | Everyday Is Christmas ‡ | 2018 | |
| "Snowflake" | Sia | Sia Furler; Greg Kurstin | Everyday Is Christmas | 2017 | |
| "Snowman" † | Sia | Sia Furler; Greg Kurstin | Everyday Is Christmas | 2017 | |
| "So Bored" | Sia | Sia Furler; Boo Hewerdine | Don't Bring Me Down * | 2003 | |
| "Sober and Unkissed" | Sia | Sia Furler; Jesse Flavell | Healing Is Difficult | 2001 | |
| "Somersault" † | Zero 7 featuring Sia | Sia Furler; Henry Binns; Sam Hardaker | When It Falls | 2004 | |
| "Soon" | Sia | Sia Furler; Jesse Flavell | OnlySee | 1997 | |
| "Soon We'll Be Found" † | Sia | Sia Furler; Rick Nowels | Some People Have Real Problems | 2008 | |
| "Space Between" | Sia | Sia Furler; Chris Braide | This Is Acting | 2016 | |
| "Speed Dial No. 2" | Zero 7 featuring Sia | Sia Furler; Henry Binns; Sam Hardaker | When It Falls | 2004 | |
| "Step by Step" | Sia | —N/a | Non-album single | 2018 | |
| "Stop Trying" | Sia | Sia Furler; Greg Kurstin | We Are Born | 2008 | |
| "Stories" | Sia | Sia Furler; Jesse Flavell | OnlySee | 1997 | |
| "Straight for the Knife" | Sia | Sia Furler; Justin Parker | 1000 Forms of Fear | 2014 | |
| "Summer Rain" | Sia | Sia Furler; Jesse Shatkin | This Is Acting ‡ | 2016 | |
| "Sunday" | Sia | Sia Furler; Samuel Dixon | Colour the Small One | 2004 | |
| "Sunshine" | Sia | Sia Furler; Greg Kurstin | Everyday Is Christmas | 2017 | |
| "Sweet Design" | Sia | Sia Furler; Chris Braide | This Is Acting | 2016 | |
| "Sweet One" | Katie Noonan & The Captains featuring Sia | Sia Furler; Katie Noonan; Lester Mendez | Emperor's Box | 2010 | |
| "Sweet Potato" | Sia | Sia Furler; Kevin Cormack; Jimmy Hogarth | Colour the Small One | 2004 | |
| "Take It to Heart" | Sia | Sia Furler; Jesse Flavell | OnlySee | 1997 | |
| "Taken for Granted" † | Sia | Sia Furler | Healing Is Difficult | 2000 | |
| "That's Life" † | 88-Keys featuring Mac Miller and Sia | Charles Njapa; Malcolm McCormick; Sia Furler; Alec Gould; Daniel Glogower; I. Rosenberg; J. O'Connell; M. LaValle; N. Ashford; Winston "Wentz" Nelson; V. Simpson | Non-album single | 2019 | |
| "This Fine Social Scene" | Zero 7 featuring Sia | Sia Furler; Henry Binns; Sam Hardaker | The Garden | 2006 | |
| "Throw It All Away" † | Zero 7 featuring Sia | Sia Furler; Henry Binns; Sam Hardaker; Dedi Madden | The Garden | 2006 | |
| "Thunderclouds" † | LSD (Labrinth, Sia and Diplo) | Sia Furler; Timothy McKenzie; Thomas Wesley Pentz; Henry Agincourt Allen; Philip Meckseper | LSD | 2018 | |
| "Titanium" † | David Guetta featuring Sia | Sia Furler; David Guetta; Giorgio Tuinfort; Nick Van De Wall | Nothing but the Beat | 2011 | |
| "Titans" † | Major Lazer featuring Sia and Labrinth | Sia Furler; Boaz van de Beatz; Philip Meckseper; Thomas Wesley Pentz; Timothy McKenzie; Yonatan Goldstein | Music Is the Weapon (Reloaded) | 2021 | |
| "Tripoutro" | Sia | Sia Furler | OnlySee | 1997 | |
| "To Be Human" | Sia featuring Labrinth | Florence Welch; Rick Nowels | Wonder Woman (soundtrack) | 2017 | |
| "Together" † | Sia | Sia Furler; Jack Antonoff | Music – Songs from and Inspired by the Motion Picture | 2020 | |
| "Under the Milky Way" † | Sia | Steve Kilbey; Karin Jansson | Non-album single | 2010 | |
| "Underneath the Christmas Lights" | Sia | Sia Furler; Greg Kurstin | Everyday Is Christmas | 2017 | |
| "Underneath the Mistletoe" | Sia | Sia Furler; Greg Kurstin | Everyday Is Christmas | 2017 | |
| "Unforgettable" † | Sia | Irving Gordon | Finding Dory – Original Motion Picture Soundtrack | 2016 | |
| "Unstoppable" † | Sia | Sia Furler; Chris Braide | This Is Acting | 2016 (Note: "Unstoppable" was originally released as a promotional single in 2016, before being released as an official single in 2022.) | |
| "Vague à l'Ame" | Juliette Katz featuring Sia | Sia Furler; Juliette Katz; Bardi Jóhannsson; Hélène Guyon | Tout Va De Travers | 2012 | |
| "Waiting to Die" | Zero 7 featuring Sia | Sia Furler; Henry Binns; Sam Hardaker | The Garden | 2006 | |
| "Waterfall" † | Stargate featuring Pink and Sia | Mikkel Storleer Eriksen; Tor Erik Hermansen; Thomas Wesley Pentz; Sia Furler; Philip Meckseper | Non-album single | 2017 | |
| "Waving Goodbye" | Sia | Sia Furler; Thomas Wesley Pentz; Andrew Swanson | The Neon Demon – Original Motion Picture Soundtrack | 2016 | |
| "Welcome to the Wonderful World of" | LSD (Labrinth, Sia and Diplo) | Sia Furler; Timothy McKenzie; Thomas Wesley Pentz | LSD | 2019 | |
| "Where I Belong" † | Sia | Sia Furler; Samuel Dixon | Colour the Small One | 2004 | |
| "The Whisperer" | David Guetta featuring Sia | David Guetta; Giorgio Tuinfort; Sia Furler | Listen Again | 2014 | |
| "Wicked Game" | Peter Jöback featuring Sia | Chris Isaak | East Side Stories | 2009 | |
| "Wild One Two" | Jack Back featuring Sia, David Guetta, and Nicky Romero | Flo Rida soFLY & Nius; Sia Furler; Axwell; Jacob Luttrell; Marcus Cooper; Niklaas Vogel-Kern | Wild Ones ‡ | 2011 | |
| "Wild Ones" † | Flo Rida featuring Sia | Flo Rida soFLY & Nius; Sia Furler; Axwell; Jacob Luttrell; Marcus Cooper; Niklaas Vogel-Kern | Wild Ones | 2012 | |
| "Wolves" † | Kanye West featuring Sia and Vic Mensa | Kanye West; Sia Furler; Victor Mensah; Magnus August Høiberg; Alan Soucy Brinsmead; Noah Goldstein; Elon Rutberg; Cydel Young; Ryan McDermott; Mike Dean; Kirby Lauryen; Pat Reynolds; Caroline Shaw | The Life of Pablo | 2016 | |
| "You Have Been Loved" | Sia | Sia Furler; Clifford Jones; Peter-John Vettese | Some People Have Real Problems | 2008 | |
| "You're My Flame" † | Zero 7 featuring Sia | Sia Furler; Henry Binns; Sam Hardaker | The Garden | 2006 | |
| "You're Never Fully Dressed Without a Smile" † | Sia | Charles Strouse; Martin Charnin | Annie (2014) – Original Motion Picture Soundtrack | 2014 | |
| "You've Changed" † | Sia | Sia Furler; Lauren Flax | We Are Born | 2010 | |
