= 2019 MTV Video Music Awards =

Award ceremony

- Date: Monday, August 26, 2019
- Venue: Prudential Center (Newark, New Jersey)
- Country: United States
- Hosted by: Sebastian Maniscalco

Highlights
- Most awards: Ariana Grande; Taylor Swift; Billie Eilish (3 each)
- Most nominations: Ariana Grande; Taylor Swift (12 each)
- Website: mtv.com/vma

Television/radio coverage
- Network: MTV; MTV2; VH1; MTV Classic; BET; Nick at Nite; CMT; Comedy Central; Logo TV; Paramount Network; TV Land; BET Her
- Produced by: Bruce Gillmer; Jesse Ignjatovic
- Directed by: Alex Rudzinski

The 2019 MTV Video Music Awards were held on August 26, 2019, at the Prudential Center in Newark, being the first VMA ceremony to be held in New Jersey. Sebastian Maniscalco hosted the 36th annual ceremony. Ariana Grande, Taylor Swift, and Billie Eilish were the most awarded with three each. Missy Elliott became the first female rapper to win the Michael Jackson Video Vanguard Award. The show was broadcast on a variety of Viacom-owned networks, as well as their respective websites, and apps through TV Everywhere authentication. 2019 MTV Video Music Awards won the 2020 Webby Award for Events in the category Social.

== Performances ==
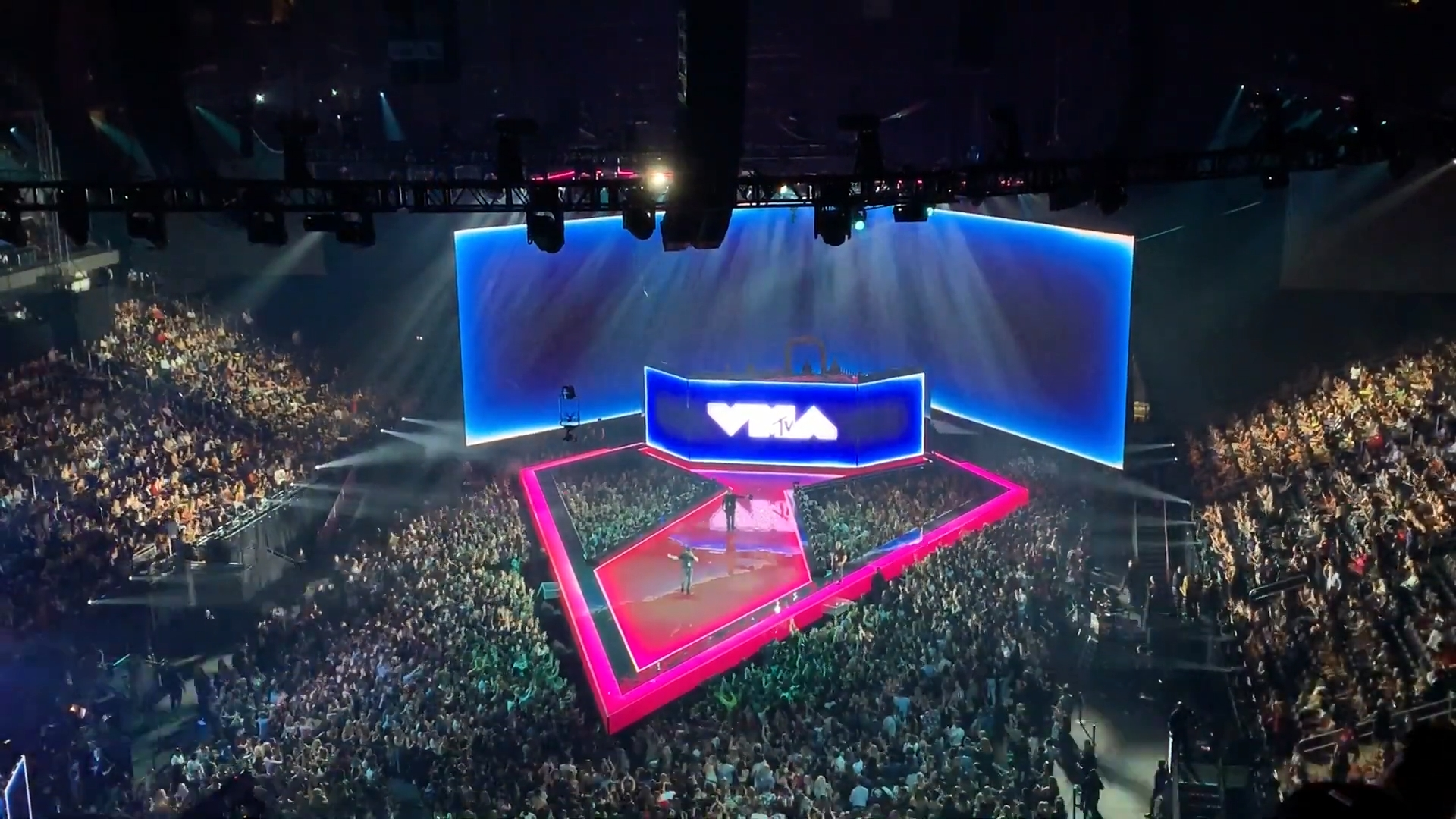
Award ceremony main stage

List of musical performances
| Artist(s) | Song(s) |
Pre-show
| Ava Max | "Torn" "Sweet but Psycho" |
| CNCO | "De Cero" |
| Megan Thee Stallion | "Big Ole Freak" "Hot Girl Summer" "Cash Shit" |
Main show
| Taylor Swift | "You Need to Calm Down" "Lover" |
| Shawn Mendes | "If I Can't Have You" |
| Lizzo | "Truth Hurts" "Good as Hell" |
| Jonas Brothers (from The Stone Pony in Asbury Park) | "Sucker" "Only Human" |
| Lil Nas X | "Panini" |
| Missy Elliott | Michael Jackson Video Vanguard Medley "Throw It Back" "The Rain (Supa Dupa Fly)" "Hot Boyz" "Get Ur Freak On" "Work It" "Pass That Dutch" "Lose Control" (contains excerpts from "Cool Off") |
| Shawn Mendes; Camila Cabello | "Señorita" |
| Miley Cyrus | "Slide Away" |
| Rosalía; Ozuna | "A Ningún Hombre" "Yo x Ti, Tu x Mi" "Aute Cuture" |
| H.E.R. | "Anti" |
| Normani | "Motivation" |
| Big Sean; ASAP Ferg | "Bezerk" |
| J Balvin; Bad Bunny | "Qué Pretendes" |
| Queen Latifah; Naughty by Nature; Redman; Fetty Wap; Wyclef Jean | Medley "O.P.P" "Trap Queen" "Gone Till November" "No Woman, No Cry" "U.N.I.T.Y." "Hip Hop Hooray" |

== Presenters ==
A variety of presenters appeared at the pre-show and main ceremony.

=== Pre-show ===
- Hayley Kiyoko – presented Push Artist of the Year
- Terrence J and Nessa (pre-show hosts) and Zara Larsson (pre-show special correspondent) – presented Best K-Pop

=== Main show ===
- Rick Ross and Pepa – presented Best Hip Hop
- Hailee Steinfeld – announced the top two nominees for Best New Artist and presented the award later in the night
- Bebe Rexha – introduced Shawn Mendes
- Alison Brie and French Montana – presented Best Latin
- Megan Thee Stallion – introduced Lizzo
- Billy Ray Cyrus – introduced Lil Nas X
- Jonathan Van Ness – presented Video for Good
- Cardi B – presented the Video Vanguard award
- Lindsey Vonn and P. K. Subban – introduced Shawn Mendes and Camila Cabello
- Queen Latifah and John Travolta – presented Video of the Year
- Lizzo – introduced Miley Cyrus
- Keke Palmer – presented Song of the Year
- Gigi Hadid and Bella Hadid – introduced Rosalía and Ozuna
- Lenny Kravitz – introduced H.E.R. and Normani
- Drea de Matteo, Vincent Pastore and Jamie-Lynn Sigler – presented Best Pop
- DJ Khaled – introduced Big Sean and ASAP Ferg
- Alex Morgan, Ali Krieger and Ashlyn Harris – presented Best Collaboration
- Victor Cruz and Adriana Lima – introduced J Balvin and Bad Bunny
- Ice-T – introduced Redman, DoItAll, Fetty Wap, Wyclef Jean, Naughty by Nature and Queen Latifah

== Winners and nominees ==
The nominees for most categories were revealed on July 23, 2019. Ariana Grande and Taylor Swift had the most nominations with ten followed by Billie Eilish with nine and Lil Nas X received eight while two new categories were included: Best K-Pop and Video for Good (previously "Video with a Message"). On August 19, three more categories were announced: Best Group, Best Power Anthem, and Song of Summer. The new categories increased the nominations for Grande and Swift to twelve each, Eilish to ten, and Lil Nas X to nine.

Winners are listed first and highlighted in bold.

| Video of the Year | Song of the Year |
|---|---|
| **Taylor Swift** **— "You Need to Calm Down"**; 21 Savage (featuring J. Cole) — "A Lot"; Billie Eilish — "Bad Guy"; Ariana Grande — "Thank U, Next"; Jonas Brothers — "Sucker"; Lil Nas X (featuring Billy Ray Cyrus) — "Old Town Road (Remix)" | **Lil Nas X (featuring Billy Ray Cyrus) — "Old Town Road (Remix)**"; Drake – "In My Feelings"; Ariana Grande — "Thank U, Next"; Jonas Brothers — "Sucker"; Lady Gaga and Bradley Cooper – "Shallow"; Taylor Swift — "You Need to Calm Down" |
| Artist of the Year | Best Group |
| **Ariana Grande**; Cardi B; Billie Eilish; Halsey; Jonas Brothers; Shawn Mendes | **BTS**; 5 Seconds of Summer; Backstreet Boys; Blackpink; CNCO; Jonas Brothers; PrettyMuch; Why Don't We |
| Best New Artist | Best Collaboration |
| **Billie Eilish**; H.E.R.; Lil Nas X; Lizzo; Ava Max; Rosalía | **Shawn Mendes and Camila Cabello – "Señorita"**; BTS (featuring Halsey) – "Boy with Luv"; Lady Gaga and Bradley Cooper – "Shallow"; Lil Nas X (featuring Billy Ray Cyrus) — "Old Town Road (Remix)"; Ed Sheeran and Justin Bieber – "I Don't Care"; Taylor Swift (featuring Brendon Urie of Panic! at the Disco) – "ME!" |
| Push Artist of the Year | Best Pop |
| **Billie Eilish**; Bazzi; CNCO; H.E.R.; Lauv; Lizzo | **Jonas Brothers — "Sucker"**; 5 Seconds of Summer – "Easier"; Cardi B and Bruno Mars – "Please Me"; Billie Eilish — "Bad Guy"; Ariana Grande — "Thank U, Next"; Khalid — "Talk"; Taylor Swift — "You Need to Calm Down" |
| Best Hip Hop | Best R&B |
| **Cardi B — "Money"**; 2 Chainz (featuring Ariana Grande) – "Rule the World"; 21 Savage (featuring J. Cole) — "A Lot"; DJ Khaled (featuring Nipsey Hussle and John Legend) — "Higher"; Lil Nas X (featuring Billy Ray Cyrus) — "Old Town Road (Remix)"; Travis Scott (featuring Drake) — "Sicko Mode" | **Normani (featuring 6lack) – "Waves"**; Childish Gambino — "Feels Like Summer"; H.E.R. (featuring Bryson Tiller) – "Could've Been"; Alicia Keys – "Raise a Man"; Ella Mai – "Trip"; Anderson .Paak (featuring Smokey Robinson) — "Make It Better" |
| Best K-Pop | Best Latin |
| **BTS (featuring Halsey) – "Boy with Luv"**; Blackpink – "Kill This Love"; Exo – "Tempo"; Monsta X (featuring French Montana) – "Who Do You Love?"; NCT 127 – "Regular"; TXT – "Cat & Dog" | **Rosalía and J Balvin (featuring El Guincho) – "Con Altura"**; Anuel AA and Karol G – "Secreto"; Bad Bunny (featuring Drake) – "Mia"; Benny Blanco, Tainy, Selena Gomez and J Balvin – "I Can't Get Enough"; Daddy Yankee (featuring Snow) – "Con Calma"; Maluma – "Mala Mía" |
| Best Dance | Best Rock |
| **The Chainsmokers and Bebe Rexha – "Call You Mine"**; Clean Bandit (featuring Demi Lovato) – "Solo"; DJ Snake (featuring Selena Gomez, Ozuna and Cardi B) – "Taki Taki"; David Guetta, Bebe Rexha and J Balvin – "Say My Name"; Marshmello and Bastille – "Happier"; Silk City and Dua Lipa – "Electricity" | **Panic! at the Disco — "High Hopes"**; The 1975 — "Love It If We Made It"; Fall Out Boy — "Bishops Knife Trick"; Imagine Dragons — "Natural"; Lenny Kravitz — "Low"; Twenty One Pilots — "My Blood" |
| Video for Good | Best Direction |
| **Taylor Swift — "You Need to Calm Down"**; Jamie N Commons and Skylar Grey (featuring Gallant) – "Runaway Train"; Halsey – "Nightmare"; The Killers – "Land of the Free"; John Legend – "Preach"; Lil Dicky – "Earth" | **Lil Nas X (featuring Billy Ray Cyrus) — "Old Town Road (Remix)" (Director: Calmatic)**; Billie Eilish — "Bad Guy" (Director: Dave Meyers); FKA Twigs – "Cellophane" (Director: Andrew Thomas Huang); Ariana Grande — "Thank U, Next" (Director: Hannah Lux Davis); LSD – "No New Friends" (Director: Dano Cerny); Taylor Swift — "You Need to Calm Down" (Director: Taylor Swift and Drew Kirsch) |
| Best Visual Effects | Best Editing |
| **Taylor Swift (featuring Brendon Urie of Panic! at the Disco) – "Me!" (Visual Effects: Loris Paillier and Lucas Salton for BUF VFX)**; DJ Khaled (featuring SZA) – "Just Us" (Visual Effects: GloriaFX, Sergii Mashevskyi and Anatolii Kuzmytskyi); Billie Eilish – "When the Party's Over" (Visual Effects: Bryan Fugal of Centralfugal Productions, Ryan Ross and Andres Jaramillo); FKA Twigs – "Cellophane" (Visual Effects: Analog); Ariana Grande – "God Is a Woman" (Visual Effects: Fabrice Lagayette at Mathematic); LSD – "No New Friends" (Visual Effects: Ethan Chancer) | **Billie Eilish — "Bad Guy" (Editor: Billie Eilish)**; Ariana Grande – "7 Rings" (Editor: Hannah Lux Davis and Taylor Walsh); Lil Nas X (featuring Billy Ray Cyrus) — "Old Town Road (Remix)" (Editor: Calmatic); Anderson .Paak (featuring Kendrick Lamar) – "Tints" (Editor: Vinnie Hobbs); Solange – "Almeda" (Editors: Solange Knowles, Vinnie Hobbs and Jonathon Proctor); Taylor Swift — "You Need to Calm Down" (Editor: Jarrett Fijal) |
| Best Art Direction | Best Choreography |
| **Ariana Grande – "7 Rings" (Art Director: John Richoux)**; BTS (featuring Halsey) – "Boy with Luv" (Art Directors: JinSil Park and BoNa Kim (MU:E)); Lil Nas X (featuring Billy Ray Cyrus) — "Old Town Road (Remix)" (Art Director: Christian Zollenkopf for Prettybird); Shawn Mendes and Camila Cabello – "Señorita" (Art Director: Tatiana Van Sauter); Taylor Swift — "You Need to Calm Down" (Art Director: Brittany Porter); Kanye West and Lil Pump (featuring Adele Givens) – "I Love It" (Art Director: Tino Schaedler) | **Rosalía and J Balvin (featuring El Guincho) – "Con Altura" (Choreographer: Charm La'Donna)**; BTS (featuring Halsey) – "Boy with Luv" (Choreographers: Son Sungdeuk and Quick Crew); FKA Twigs – "Cellophane" (Choreographer: Kelly Yvonne); LSD – "No New Friends" (Choreographer: Ryan Heffington); Shawn Mendes and Camila Cabello – "Señorita" (Choreographer: Calvit Hodge); Solange – "Almeda" (Choreographers: Maya Taylor and Solange Knowles) |
| Best Cinematography | Best Power Anthem |
| **Shawn Mendes and Camila Cabello – "Señorita" (Director of Photography: Scott Cunningham)**; Billie Eilish – "Hostage" (Director of Photography: Pau Castejón); Ariana Grande — "Thank U, Next" (Director of Photography: Christopher Probst); Anderson .Paak (featuring Kendrick Lamar) – "Tints" (Director of Photography: Elias Talbot); Solange – "Almeda" (Directors of Photography: Chayse Irvin, Ryan Marie Helfant and Justin Hamilton); Taylor Swift (featuring Brendon Urie of Panic! at the Disco) – "ME!" (Director of Photography: Starr Whitesides) | **Megan Thee Stallion (featuring Nicki Minaj and Ty Dolla Sign) — "Hot Girl Summer"**; Miley Cyrus — "Mother's Daughter"; DJ Khaled (featuring Cardi B and 21 Savage) — "Wish Wish"; Ariana Grande — "7 Rings"; Halsey — "Nightmare"; Lizzo (featuring Missy Elliott) — "Tempo"; Maren Morris — "GIRL"; Taylor Swift — "You Need to Calm Down" |
| Song of Summer | MTV Fashion Trailblazer Award |
| **Ariana Grande and Social House — "Boyfriend"**; The Chainsmokers and Bebe Rexha — "Call You Mine"; Miley Cyrus — "Mother's Daughter"; DaBaby — "Suge"; Billie Eilish — "Bad Guy"; Jonas Brothers — "Sucker"; Khalid — "Talk"; Lil Nas X (featuring Billy Ray Cyrus) — "Old Town Road (Remix)"; Lil Tecca — "Ransom"; Lizzo — "Truth Hurts"; Shawn Mendes and Camila Cabello – "Señorita"; Post Malone (featuring Young Thug) — "Goodbyes"; Rosalía and J Balvin (featuring El Guincho) — "Con Altura"; Ed Sheeran and Justin Bieber – "I Don't Care"; Taylor Swift — "You Need to Calm Down"; Young Thug (featuring J. Cole and Travis Scott) — "The London" | **Marc Jacobs** |
Michael Jackson Video Vanguard Award
**Missy Elliott**

== Artists with multiple wins and nominations ==
Artists who received multiple awards
| Wins | Artist |
|---|---|
| 3 | Ariana Grande |
| 3 | Billie Eilish |
| 3 | Taylor Swift |
| 2 | Billy Ray Cyrus |
| 2 | BTS |
| 2 | Camila Cabello |
| 2 | El Guincho |
| 2 | J Balvin |
| 2 | Lil Nas X |
| 2 | Panic! at the Disco |
| 2 | Rosalía |
| 2 | Shawn Mendes |

Artists who received multiple nominations
| Nominations | Artist |
|---|---|
| 12 | Ariana Grande |
| 12 | Taylor Swift |
| 10 | Billie Eilish |
| 9 | Lil Nas X |
| 8 | Billy Ray Cyrus |
| 7 | Halsey |
| 6 | Jonas Brothers |
| 6 | Shawn Mendes |
| 5 | BTS |
| 5 | Camila Cabello |
| 5 | Cardi B |
| 5 | J Balvin |
| 4 | Lizzo |
| 4 | Panic! at the Disco |
| 4 | Rosalía |
| 3 | 21 Savage |
| 3 | Anderson .Paak |
| 3 | Bebe Rexha |
| 3 | DJ Khaled |
| 3 | Drake |
| 3 | El Guincho |
| 3 | FKA Twigs |
| 3 | H.E.R. |
| 3 | J. Cole |
| 3 | LSD |
| 3 | Solange |
| 2 | 5 Seconds of Summer |
| 2 | Blackpink |
| 2 | Bradley Cooper |
| 2 | CNCO |
| 2 | Ed Sheeran |
| 2 | John Legend |
| 2 | Justin Bieber |
| 2 | Khalid |
| 2 | Kendrick Lamar |
| 2 | Lady Gaga |
| 2 | Miley Cyrus |
| 2 | Selena Gomez |
| 2 | The Chainsmokers |
| 2 | Travis Scott |
| 2 | Young Thug |

== Music Videos with multiple wins and nominations ==
Music Videos that received multiple awards
| Wins | Artist(s) | Music Video |
|---|---|---|
| 2 | Lil Nas X (featuring Billy Ray Cyrus) | "Old Town Road (Remix)" |
| 2 | Rosalía and J Balvin (featuring El Guincho) | "Con Altura" |
| 2 | Shawn Mendes and Camila Cabello | "Señorita" |
| 2 | Taylor Swift | "You Need to Calm Down" |

Music Videos that received multiple nominations
| Nominations | Artist(s) | Music Video |
|---|---|---|
| 9 | Taylor Swift | "You Need to Calm Down" |
| 8 | Lil Nas X (featuring Billy Ray Cyrus) | "Old Town Road (Remix)" |
| 5 | Ariana Grande | "Thank U, Next" |
| 5 | Billie Eilish | "Bad Guy" |
| 5 | Shawn Mendes and Camila Cabello | "Señorita" |
| 4 | BTS (featuring Halsey) | "Boy with Luv" |
| 4 | Jonas Brothers | "Sucker" |
| 3 | Ariana Grande | "7 Rings" |
| 3 | FKA Twigs | "Cellophane" |
| 3 | LSD | "No New Friends" |
| 3 | Rosalía and J Balvin (featuring El Guincho) | "Con Altura" |
| 3 | Solange | "Almeda" |
| 3 | Taylor Swift (featuring Brendon Urie of Panic! at the Disco) | "ME!" |
| 2 | 21 Savage (featuring J. Cole) | "A Lot" |
| 2 | Anderson .Paak (featuring Kendrick Lamar) | "Tints" |
| 2 | Ed Sheeran and Justin Bieber | "I Don't Care" |
| 2 | Halsey | "Nightmare" |
| 2 | Khalid | "Talk" |
| 2 | Lady Gaga and Bradley Cooper | "Shallow" |
| 2 | Miley Cyrus | "Mother's Daughter" |
| 2 | The Chainsmokers and Bebe Rexha | "Call You Mine" |

== See also ==
- 2019 MTV Europe Music Awards
