= I'm Still Here (Sia song) =

2018 single by Sia

Single by Sia
- Released: 12 October 2018
- Length: 4:01
- Label: Monkey Puzzle; Atlantic
- Songwriters: Sia Furler; Jesse Shatkin
- Producer: Jesse Shatkin

Sia singles chronology
"Here I Am" (2018)	"I'm Still Here" (2018)	"That's Life" (2019)

Audio video
- "I'm Still Here" on YouTube

"I'm Still Here" is a song by Australian singer-songwriter Sia. It was released as a standalone single on 12 October 2018 by Monkey Puzzle and Atlantic Records in connection with Sia's collaboration with French shoe brand Repetto. It is featured as a bonus track on the Japanese edition of Sia's ninth studio album, Music – Songs from and Inspired by the Motion Picture.

== Background and release ==
In 2018, Sia joined forces with Labrinth and Diplo to form pop supergroup LSD. Their debut single, "Genius" was released on 3 May 2018, followed by "Audio" a week later, and "Thunderclouds" in August 2018. Their debut album was originally slated for a November 2018 release, but was eventually released in April 2019. 2018 also saw Sia collaborate with Dolly Parton and David Guetta on the singles "Here I Am" (from the Dumplin' soundtrack) and "Flames", respectively.

On 28 September 2018, Sia announced the release of a collection of shoes, designed by her, in collaboration with French shoe company Repetto. On 9 October, Sia teased the release of a new song titled "I'm Still Here", and it was released on 12 October, in connection with the Repetto collaboration. The shoe line was made available for purchase in February 2019.

"I'm Still Here" was used in a public service announcement video from Everytown for Gun Safety, standing up against gun violence in the United States, and was also featured in the HBO documentary At the Heart of Gold: Inside the USA Gymnastics Scandal.

== Composition ==
Billboard described "I'm Still Here" as an "inspirational" song. Lyrically, it is about perseverance and Sia's battles with the past. At a length of 4 minutes and 1 second, the song was written by Sia and frequent collaborator Jesse Shatkin in the key of A major, and produced solely by Shatkin. Sia's vocals in the song span from F♯_{3} to A_{4}.

== Credits and personnel ==
Credits adapted from Tidal.

- Sia Furler – writer, vocals, bells
- Jesse Shatkin – writer, producer, bass, drum programmer, drums, piano, string arranger, synthesizer, engineer
- Samuel Dent – string arranger, additional engineer
- Serban Ghenea – mixer
- John Hanes – mixing engineer

== Charts ==
Chart performance for "I'm Still Here"
Chart (2018–2019)	Peak position
France (SNEP)	189
New Zealand Hot Singles (RMNZ)	25
Switzerland (Schweizer Hitparade)	65

== Release history ==
Release history and formats for "I'm Still Here"
Region	Date	Format	Label	Ref.
Various	12 October 2018	Digital download; streaming	Monkey Puzzle; Atlantic	
Australia	19 October 2018	Contemporary hit radio	Warner Music Australia	
Italy	14 December 2018	Contemporary hit radio	Warner	
