= No New Friends (LSD song) =

- Remixes version cover artwork

Single by LSD

from the album LSD
- Released: 14 March 2019
- Recorded: 2018
- Studio: Beachwood Park (Los Angeles); Lazer Sound (Beachwood Canyon); Westlake (Los Angeles); Blender's Ends (Hamburg)
- Genre: Pop
- Length: 2:55
- Label: Columbia
- Songwriters: Timothy McKenzie; Sia Furler; Thomas Pentz; Henry Allen; Philip Meckseper
- Producers: Labrinth; Diplo; Jr Blender; Nathaniel Ledwidge (misc.)

LSD singles chronology
"Mountains" (2018)	"No New Friends" (2019)

Music video
- "No New Friends" on YouTube

"No New Friends", sometimes titled "Know New Friends", is a song by LSD from the group's album of the same name, released by Columbia Records on 14 March 2019. The song serves as the album's fifth and final single, following "Genius", "Audio", "Thunderclouds", and "Mountains".

== Composition ==
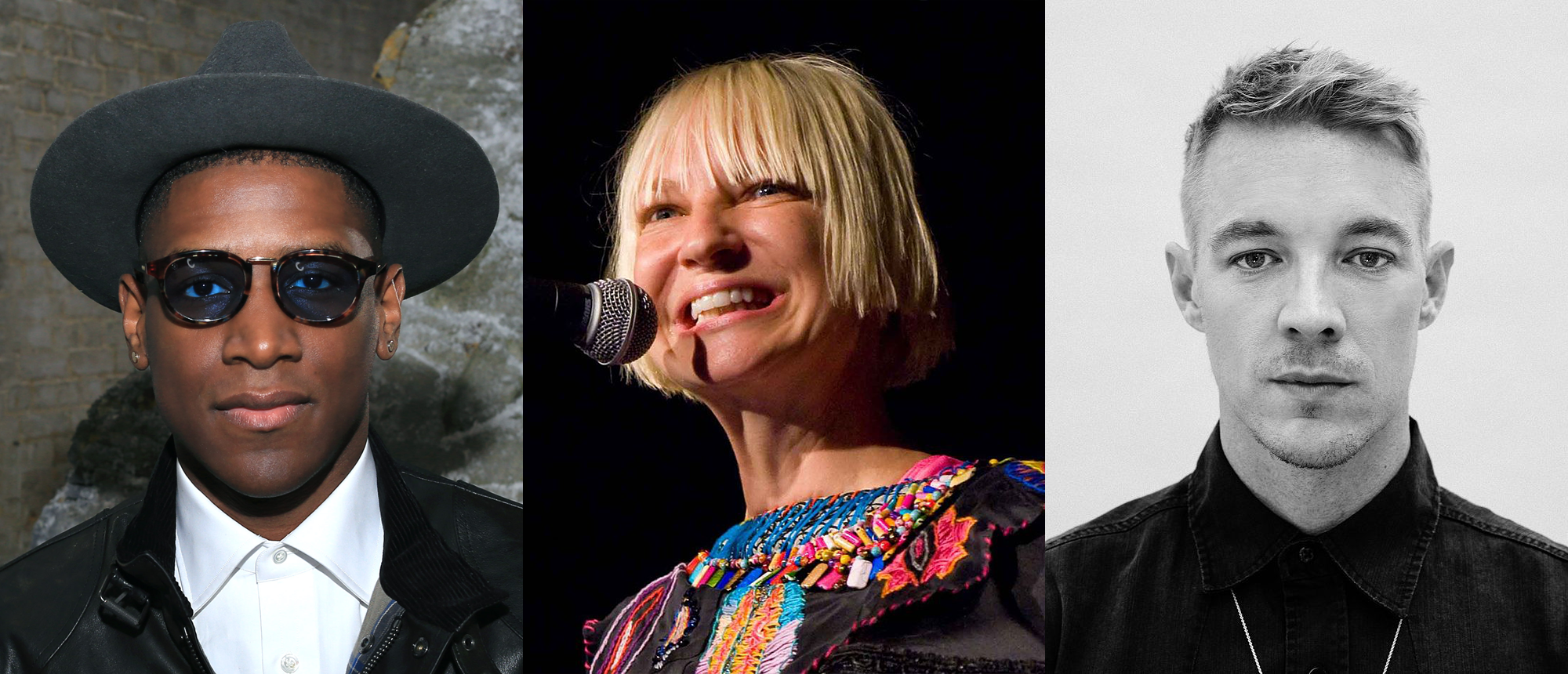
The members of LSD, from left to right: Labrinth, Sia and Diplo

"No New Friends" is a pop song with electronic dance music (EDM) influences, and has a "thumping" dance beat with "bouncy" synth loops by Diplo, as well as harmonized vocals by Sia and Labrinth. Jon Blistein of Rolling Stone describes the song's bridge as "reminiscent of a boozy piano ballad".

== Release and promotion ==
Sia confirmed the song's release date via Twitter on 12 March 2019. The group performed "No New Friends" on The Ellen DeGeneres Show in April 2019.

== Reception ==
Billboard's Kat Bein described "No New Friends" as a "bright, rhythm-led tune that pops warm and sunny like spring for your ears", and "infectiously catchy with a touch of the islands that celebrates the buddies we already have". Derrick Rossignol of Uproxx called the song "upbeat" and "an ode to appreciating what you have". He wrote, "The song gives everybody a chance to shine, thanks to Sia's idiosyncratic vocals, Labrinth's hip-hop energy, and Diplo’s EDM-influenced pop production that ties everything together."

== Music video ==
The official music video for the song was released on 16 April 2019. Rolling Stone's review called the video "an appropriately fantastical visual" and described it as follows: "The clip, directed by Dano Cerny and choreographed by Ryan Heffington, stars Sia's sixteen-year-old body double Maddie Ziegler as a giant. She encounters the pink-clad Labrinth in a Dr. Seussian land of puff-ball trees and whimsical puffy clouds, and the two quickly form a bond. They frolic through the trees, stare up at cloud formations and encounter human-sized clones of Ziegler dancing giddily on a hillside. Diplo appears later in the video as a floating sun and moon, and as another giant who towers over Ziegler. The video received nominations for Best Visual Effects and Best Art Direction at the 2019 MTV Video Music Awards."

== Track listing ==
- Digital download – Remixes
1. "No New Friends" (Dombresky Remix) – 4:06
2. "No New Friends" (Aaron Redding Remix) – 2:48

== Credits and personnel ==
Credits adapted from liner notes of LSD.

- Sia Furler – writer, lyricist, vocals
- Labrinth – writer, lyricist, vocals, producer, engineer, instrumentation, programming
- Diplo – writer, producer, instrumentation, programming
- King Henry – writer, producer, instrumentation, programming
- Jr Blender – writer, producer, instrumentation, programming
- Nathaniel "Detonate" Ledwidge – additional production
- Bart Schoudel – engineer
- Serban Ghenea – mixer
- John Hanes – engineer for mix
- Randy Merrill – masterer

== Charts ==
Chart (2019)	Peak position
Czech Republic Singles Digital (ČNS IFPI)	90
China Airplay/FL (Billboard)	21
France (SNEP)	173
Ireland (IRMA)	61
Israel (Media Forest TV Airplay)	1
Lebanon English (Lebanese Top 20)	17
Lithuania (AGATA)	60
New Zealand Hot Singles (RMNZ)	10
Slovakia Singles Digital (ČNS IFPI)	78
Sweden Heatseeker (Sverigetopplistan)	8

== Certifications ==
Region	Certification	Certified units/sales
Canada (Music Canada)	Gold	40,000^{‡}
Poland (ZPAV)	Gold	10,000^{‡}
^{‡} Sales+streaming figures based on certification alone.

== See also ==
- Diplo discography
- Labrinth discography
- Sia discography
