= Mountains (LSD song) =

Single by LSD

from the album LSD
- Released: 1 November 2018
- Recorded: 2018
- Studio: Beachwood Park (Los Angeles); Lazer Sound (Beachwood Canyon); Conway (Los Angeles)
- Genre: Electropop
- Length: 3:14
- Label: Columbia
- Songwriter(s): Timothy McKenzie; Sia Furler; Thomas Pentz
- Producer(s): Labrinth; Diplo; Nathaniel Ledwidge

LSD singles chronology
"Thunderclouds" (2018)	"Mountains" (2018)	"No New Friends" (2019)

"Mountains" is a song by pop music group LSD. The song was released on 1 November 2018, and marks the group's fourth release, following "Genius", "Audio", and "Thunderclouds".

The song was used in musical film Music, co-written and directed by Sia. In the film, it is performed by Kate Hudson and Leslie Odom Jr.

== Release and promotion ==
Ground members shared a short animated teaser audio and video clip on October 29, 2018. Diplo shared part of the song on Instagram on October 31, and the track was released on November 1.

== Reception ==
DJ Mag described the song as "electronic pop goodness".

== Credits and personnel ==
Credits adapted from the liner notes of LSD.

- Sia – writer, lyricist, vocals
- Labrinth – writer, lyricist, vocals, producer, programming, instrumentation, engineer
- Diplo – writer, producer, programming, instrumentation
- Nathaniel "Detonate" Ledwidge – producer, programming, instrumentation
- Boaz van de Beatz – additional production
- Gustave Rudman – additional production
- Yoda Francesco – additional production
- Bart Schoudel – engineer
- Luke Dimond – engineer
- Chris Galland – mix engineer
- Robin Florent – assistant mix engineer
- Scott Desmarais – assistant mix engineer
- Manny Marroquin – mixer
- Randy Merrill – masterer

== See also ==
- Diplo discography
- Labrinth discography
- Sia discography
