= How to Breathe =

How to Breathe may refer to:

- "How to Breathe", a song by Volcano Suns, from their 1989 album Thing of Beauty
- "How to Breathe", a 1997 single and EP by Sia
- "How to Breathe", a song by Momma, from their 2025 album Welcome to My Blue Sky
- "How to Breathe", a song by The Rions, from their 2025 album Everything Every Single Day, featuring Matt Corby

== See also ==
- "How Do I Breathe", a song by Mario, from his 2007 album Go
