= No New Friends =

No New Friends may refer to:

- "No New Friends" (DJ Khaled song), 2013
- "No New Friends" (LSD song), 2019
