= Ask & You Shall Receive =

Single by Rita Ora
- Released: 31 May 2024
- Genre: Dance-pop
- Length: 3:19
- Label: BMG
- Songwriters: Rachel Keen; Oliver Peterhof
- Producer: German

Rita Ora singles chronology
"Shape of Me" (2024)	"Ask & You Shall Receive" (2024)	"Heat" (2025)

"Ask & You Shall Receive" is a song by British singer Rita Ora. BMG released it on 31 May 2024. The single was written by Rachel Keen and Oliver Peterhof, and produced by the latter. "Ask & You Shall Receive" was promoted by a music video directed by Dano Cerny.

== Background and release ==
Prior to releasing "Ask & You Shall Receive", Rita Ora released singles in collaboration with Gryffin and Keith Urban, respectively, in 2024. The song is her first release under BMG Rights Management and is set to be included on her upcoming studio album. BMG released it on 31 May 2024 for digital download and streaming.

== Composition and reception ==
"Ask & You Shall Receive" was written by Rachel Keen (Raye) and Oliver Peterhof (German), and produced by the latter. Raye sent Ora the song via email and Ora "loved it". George Griffiths of the Official Charts Company wrote that the lyric "I've got this feeling that's refreshing my life" is sung by Ora "over a bouncy, funk bassline" and that the single "chugs along with a house-inspired beat, buoyed by its euphoric chorus". According to Tayo Odutola of Earmilk, "Ask & You Shall Receive" is "bolstered by a prevalent bass-driven groove and rousing guitar licks that rise to a crescendo on the chorus". Time Out's Chiara Wilkinson described the single as an upbeat dance-pop song.

Griffiths said that "Ask & You Shall Receive" is a "funky summer tune". Odutola deemed it "a vibrant and uplifting jam". Wonderland called the song an "infectious floor filler infused with summer vibes and carpe diem spirit".

== Music video ==
A music video directed by Dano Cerny was released alongside the single. The visual was shot in a 24-hour laundromat in Los Angeles and is inspired by a 1985 Levi's 501 commercial which featured singer Nick Kamen. In it, Ora "take[s] over" the establishment by smashing it with a bat and taking its money. Her husband, filmmaker Taika Waititi, appears in the music video as a laundromat attendant. According to Ora, the laundromat featured in the visual is the same one that appeared in the film Everything Everywhere All at Once (2022).

== Charts ==
=== Weekly charts ===
Weekly chart performance for "Ask & You Shall Receive"
Chart (2024)	Peak position
Belarus Airplay (TopHit)	43
CIS Airplay (TopHit)	50
Estonia Airplay (TopHit)	49
Latvia Airplay (TopHit)	6
Lithuania Airplay (TopHit)	46
Russia Airplay (TopHit)	51
UK Singles Downloads (Official Charts)	43

=== Monthly charts ===
Monthly chart performance for "Ask & You Shall Receive"
Chart (2025)	Peak position
Belarus Airplay (TopHit)	58
CIS Airplay (TopHit)	82
Estonia Airplay (TopHit)	63
Latvia Airplay (TopHit)	6
Lithuania Airplay (TopHit)	73
Russia Airplay (TopHit)	63

=== Year-end charts ===
Year-end chart performance for "Ask & You Shall Receive"
Chart (2024)	Position
Latvia Airplay (TopHit)	20

== Release history ==
Release dates and formats for "Ask & You Shall Receive"
Country	Date	Format(s)	Version	Label	Ref.
Various	31 May 2024	Digital download; streaming	Original	BMG	
Various	12 July 2024	Digital download; streaming	Remix EP	BMG	
Italy	12 July 2024	Airplay	Original	BMG	
