= Labrinth, Sia & Diplo Present... LSD =

LSD

Studio album by LSD
- Released: 12 April 2019
- Recorded: 2018–2019
- Studios: Beachwood Park (Los Angeles); Lazer Sound (Beachwood Canyon); Conway (Los Angeles); Janitor (London); Blender's Ends (Hamburg); Westlake (Los Angeles); YM (Miami)
- Genres: Dance-pop; pop rock; power pop; psychedelic pop
- Length: 30:41
- Label: Columbia
- Producers: Labrinth; Diplo; Jr Blender; Gustave Rudman; King Henry; Nathaniel Ledwidge; Boaz van de Beatz; Yoda Francesco

Labrinth chronology
| Atomic (2012) | LSD (2019) | Euphoria (Original Score from the HBO Series) (2019) |

Sia chronology
| Everyday Is Christmas (2017) | LSD (2019) | Music – Songs from and Inspired by the Motion Picture (2021) |

Diplo chronology
| Europa (2019) | LSD (2019) | Diplo Presents Thomas Wesley, Chapter 1: Snake Oil (2020) |

Singles from LSD
- 1. "Genius" Released: 3 May 2018; 2. "Audio" Released: 10 May 2018; 3. "Thunderclouds" Released: 9 August 2018; 4. "Mountains" Released: 1 November 2018; 5. "No New Friends" Released: 14 March 2019

Labrinth, Sia & Diplo Present... LSD, also known simply as LSD, is the only studio album by the music group LSD. Originally scheduled to be released by Columbia Records on 2 November 2018, it was pushed back to 12 April 2019.

== Background ==
LSD, consisting of English singer-producer Labrinth, Australian singer-songwriter Sia, and American producer-DJ Diplo, was teased on 11 March 2018 by Diplo after he posted a picture of a cassette with the logo of LSD on his Instagram. Five singles were released prior to the release, as well as a remix of "Genius", featuring Lil Wayne.

== Physical release ==
The album was released on CD, and a Japanese edition was released containing four bonus remixes. On 28 June 2019, a limited edition coloured vinyl was released.

== Singles ==
"Genius" was released on 3 May 2018 as the album's lead single. It impacted alternative radio in the US on 19 June 2018, and is featured on the video game by EA Sports, FIFA 19. "Audio" served as the second single off of the album. It was released on 10 May 2018 and impacted contemporary hit radio in the US on 26 June 2018. The third single, "Thunderclouds", was released on 9 August 2018. It was used as the main theme song for the Samsung Galaxy Note 9 promotional campaign, being featured extensively in parts in the company's ads, as well as at the reveal event in New York on 9 August 2018. "Mountains" was released as the fourth single from the album on 1 November 2018. "No New Friends" was made available for download on 14 March 2019. A remix of "Heaven Can Wait" by The Aston Shuffle was released on 24 May 2019.

== Critical reception ==
Professional ratings
Aggregate scores
| Source | Rating |
|---|---|
| AnyDecentMusic? | 5.3/10 |
| Metacritic | 60/100 |
Review scores
| Source | Rating |
| AllMusic | 4/5 stars |
| Entertainment Weekly | B+ |
| The Ithican | 4.5/5 stars |
| NME | 3/5 stars |
| The Observer | 2/5 stars |
| Pitchfork | 3.2/10 |
| The Times | 2/5 stars |

LSD received mixed reviews from critics. Kat Bein of Entertainment Weekly wrote that LSD were not afraid to "get weird" on this project and praised the album, noting that its "mix of tropical vibes and experimental hooks give [it] a pleasant, lush, varied landscape of tones and tempos". Writing for Pitchfork, Dani Blum criticised the album, writing that it sounds like "an algorithmic midden of pop music" and that the lyrical content is "asinine". Jem Aswad of Variety noted that there are "several gems" in the album's tracks, and praised Labrinth and Diplo's production. Reviewing for NME, El Hunt gave LSD 3 out of 5 stars, praising "exceptional" stand-out tracks such as "Thunderclouds" and "Genius", but also implying the album is generic, and those desiring more experimental music should "[look] elsewhere". Neil Z. Yeung of AllMusic rated the album 4 out of 5 stars, describing the album as "good and fun", and as an "experience to embrace and enjoy".

The album received a weighted average rating of 60 based on reviews from seven critics on review aggregator Metacritic, indicating "mixed or average" reception.

== Commercial performance ==
The album has accumulated over 1 billion streams on Spotify. It debuted and peaked at number 70 on the US Billboard 200 and 44 on the UK Albums Chart, and has been certified Platinum in Brazil and Gold in Norway.

== Track listing ==
| No. | Title | Writer(s) | Producer(s) | Length |
|---|---|---|---|---|
| 1. | "Welcome to the Wonderful World Of" | Thomas Pentz; Timothy McKenzie; Sia Furler | Diplo; Labrinth | 1:56 |
| 2. | "Angel in Your Eyes" | Pentz; McKenzie; Furler | Diplo; Labrinth; Nathaniel Ledwidge | 3:06 |
| 3. | "Genius" | Pentz; McKenzie; Furler; Philip Meckseper | Diplo; Labrinth; Jr Blender; Gustave Rudman^{[a]} | 3:33 |
| 4. | "Audio" | Pentz; McKenzie; Furler; Meckseper; Henry Allen | Diplo; Labrinth; King Henry; Jr Blender^{[c]}; Rudman^{[a]} | 3:24 |
| 5. | "Thunderclouds" | Pentz; McKenzie; Furler; Allen; Meckseper | Diplo; Labrinth; King Henry; Jr Blender | 3:07 |
| 6. | "Mountains" | Pentz; McKenzie; Furler | Diplo; Labrinth; Ledwidge; Rudman^{[a]}; Boaz van de Beatz^{[a]}; Yoda Francesco^{[a]} | 3:14 |
| 7. | "No New Friends" | Pentz; McKenzie; Furler; Allen; Meckseper | Diplo; Labrinth; King Henry; Jr Blender; Ledwidge^{[a]} | 2:55 |
| 8. | "Heaven Can Wait" | Pentz; McKenzie; Furler; Meckseper | Diplo; Labrinth; Jr Blender; Ledwidge^{[a]} | 3:15 |
| 9. | "It's Time" | Pentz; McKenzie; Furler | Diplo; Labrinth | 3:29 |
| 10. | "Genius" (Lil Wayne Remix) | Pentz; McKenzie; Furler; Meckseper; Dwayne Carter Jr. | Diplo; Labrinth; Jr Blender; Rudman^{[a]} | 2:42 |
| Total length: | | | | 30:41 |

Japan bonus tracks
| No. | Title | Length |
|---|---|---|
| 11. | "Audio" (CID Remix) | 2:41 |
| 12. | "Genius" (Banx & Ranx Remix) | 2:56 |
| 13. | "Thunderclouds" (Lost Frequencies Remix) | 3:18 |
| 14. | "Thunderclouds" (64-bit Version) | 1:52 |
| Total length: | | 41:35 |

Notes

- ^{^[c]} signifies a co-producer.
- ^{^[a]} signifies an additional producer.
- "No New Friends" is titled "Know New Friends" on vinyl pressings.

== Personnel ==
LSD

- Labrinth – performance, engineering, programming
- Sia – performance
- Diplo – performance, programming

Other contributors

- Randy Merrill – mastering
- Jaycen Joshua – mixing (1, 9)
- Manny Marroquin – mixing (2–6)
- Chris Galland – mixing (2–6)
- Serban Ghenea – mixing (7, 8, 10)
- John Hanes – mixing (7, 8, 10)
- Bart Schoudel – engineering (3–7, 10)
- Luke Dimond – engineering (3, 6, 10)
- Nathaniel "Detonate" Ledwidge – programming (2, 6)
- Jr Blender – programming (4, 5, 7, 8, 10)
- King Henry – programming (4, 5, 7)
- Jacob Richards – engineering assistance (1, 9)
- Mike Seaberg – engineering assistance (1, 9)
- Rashawn Mclean – engineering assistance (1, 9)
- Robin Florent – engineering assistance (2–6)
- Scott Desmarais – engineering assistance (2–6)
- Jason Delattiboudere – engineering assistance (10)

== Charts ==
=== Weekly charts ===
| Chart (2019) | Peak position |
|---|---|
| Australian Albums (ARIA) | 49 |
| Austrian Albums (Ö3 Austria) | 29 |
| Belgian Albums (Ultratop Flanders) | 72 |
| Belgian Albums (Ultratop Wallonia) | 66 |
| Canadian Albums (Billboard) | 33 |
| Czech Albums (ČNS IFPI) | 56 |
| Dutch Albums (Album Top 100) | 16 |
| Finnish Albums (Suomen virallinen lista) | 21 |
| French Albums (SNEP) | 25 |
| German Albums (Offizielle Top 100) | 49 |
| Irish Albums (Official Charts) | 45 |
| Italian Albums (FIMI) | 53 |
| Japan Hot Albums (Billboard Japan) | 96 |
| Japanese Albums (Oricon) | 65 |
| Latvian Albums (LAIPA) | 14 |
| Lithuanian Albums (AGATA) | 8 |
| New Zealand Albums (RMNZ) | 35 |
| Norwegian Albums (VG-lista) | 10 |
| Scottish Albums (Official Charts) | 53 |
| South Korean Albums (Gaon) | 90 |
| Spanish Albums (Promusicae) | 39 |
| Swedish Albums (Sverigetopplistan) | 17 |
| Swiss Albums (Schweizer Hitparade) | 24 |
| UK Albums (Official Charts) | 44 |
| US Billboard 200 | 70 |

=== Year-end charts ===
| Chart (2019) | Position |
|---|---|
| French Albums (SNEP) | 149 |

== Certifications ==
| Region | Certification | Certified units/sales |
|---|---|---|
| Brazil (Pro-Música Brasil) | Platinum | 40,000^{‡} |
| France (SNEP) | Gold | 50,000^{‡} |
| Mexico (AMPROFON) | Gold | 30,000^{‡} |
| New Zealand (RMNZ) | Gold | 7,500^{‡} |
| Norway (IFPI Norway) | Gold | 10,000^{‡} |
| Poland (ZPAV) | Gold | 10,000^{‡} |
| Singapore (RIAS) | Gold | 5,000^{*} |
^{*} Sales figures based on certification alone.^{‡} Sales+streaming figures based on certification alone.

== See also ==
- Diplo discography
- Labrinth discography
- Sia discography
