= King Henry (producer) =

American record producer and DJ

- Born: Henry Agincourt Allen
- Origin: Los Angeles, United States
- Genres: EDM; downtempo; future house; moombahton; electro-pop
- Occupations: Record producer; songwriter; DJ
- Years active: 2008–present

Henry Agincourt Allen, better known as King Henry, is an American record producer and DJ. After moving to Los Angeles, Allen landed an internship with DJ and record producer Diplo. He has since been involved in most of the DJ's projects, including work by Major Lazer, Beyoncé, Justin Bieber, Charli XCX, Mark Ronson, the Weeknd, Desiigner, Madison Beer, Sting, and Kiesza.

== Career ==
Allen studied classical guitar and initially didn't think that his music would focus on a mainstream sound. He admitted, "I really wasn't super interested in making 'pop' music at all". This changed after his first few success stories, including co-writing and co-producing Major Lazer's song "Cold Water" and Beyoncé's "All Night".

King Henry released his debut EP, Don't Stay Away, in late 2016, on Black Butter Records worldwide and his own Duke City in North America. The album features vocals by Naations, SEMMA, Bloodboy, and Emmi. His follow-up EP, titled For You, was released in 2017, also on Black Butter and Duke City, and features Sasha Sloan, Rhye, RY X, and Maejor. The end of 2017 saw King Henry performing his first-ever live shows, supporting RÜFÜS DU SOL.

== Discography ==
=== EPs ===
Title	Album details	Track listing
Don't Stay Away	Released: November 11, 2016; Label: Duke City / Black Butter Records (UK); Format: digital download	1. "Don't Stay Away" (feat. Naations); 2. "Steady Soul" (feat. Emmi); 3. "Pulse" (feat. Bloodboy); 4. "Gold Dust" (feat. Semma)
For You	Released: September 29, 2017; Label: Duke City / Black Butter Records (UK); Format: digital download	1. "I'll Be There" (feat. Sasha Sloan); 2. "DeJa Vu" (feat. Maejor); 3. "Destiny" (feat. RY X); 4. "Moment" (feat. Rhye)

=== Singles ===
Title	Details
"Don't Stay Away" (Acoustic) (feat. Naations)	Released: December 16, 2016; Label: Duke City / Black Butter Records (UK); Format: digital download
"Destiny" (feat. RY X)	Released: June 30, 2017; Label: Duke City / Black Butter Records (UK); Format: digital download
"Moment" (feat. Rhye)	Released: August 4, 2017; Label: Duke City / Black Butter Records (UK); Format: digital download
"Bad for Me" (feat. Elle Watson)	Released: June 29, 2018; Label: Duke City / Black Butter Records (UK); Format: digital download
"What About Me"	Released: October 18, 2018; Label: Duke City / Black Butter Records (UK); Format: digital download
"Let You Know"	Released: April 26, 2019; Label: Duke City / Black Butter Records (UK); Format: digital download
"Before U" (with Sonny Fodera feat. AlunaGeorge)	Released: February 28, 2020; Label: Duke City / Black Butter Records (UK); Format: digital download
"It's Not U"	Released: November 5, 2021; Label: Duke City / Black Butter Records (UK); Format: digital download

== Songwriting and production credits ==
Year	Artist	Song	Album
2015	Pizza Boy	"This is Me, Air-Drying My Soggy Knees"	This is Pizza Boy
2015	Luhan	"Lu"	Reloaded
2016	Beyoncé	"All Night"	Lemonade
2016	Major Lazer	"Cold Water" feat. Justin Bieber and MØ	Major Lazer Essentials
2016	Liz	"Forever"	Cross Your Heart
2016	Tkay Maidza	"House of Cards"	Tkay
2017	Pabllo Vittar	"Entao Vai" feat. Diplo	Vai Passar Mal
2017	Girli	"Not That Girl"	Feel OK
2017	Diplo	"Bankroll" feat. Justin Bieber, Rich the Kid, and Young Thug	Non-album single
2017	XXXTentacion	"Looking for a Star"	Revenge
2017	Major Lazer	"Know No Better" feat. Camila Cabello, Travis Scott, and Quavo	Know No Better
2017	Major Lazer	"Front of the Line" feat. Machel Montano and Konshens	Know No Better
2017	Gia	"What I Like"	Keeps on Coming
2017	Starrah with Diplo	"Zoo"	Starrah x Diplo
2017	Starrah with Diplo	"You Know It"	Starrah x Diplo
2017	Starrah with Diplo	"Swerve"	Starrah x Diplo
2017	Maroon 5	"Help Me Out" with Julia Michaels	Red Pill Blues
2017	Sasha Sloan	"Ready Yet"	Sad Girl
2017	Diplo	"Get It Right" feat. MØ	Major Lazer presents: Give Me Future
2017	Major Lazer	"Love Life" feat. Azaryah	Major Lazer presents: Give Me Future
2017	Charli XCX	"Porsche" feat. MØ	Pop 2
2018	Sasha Sloan	"Normal"	Sad Girl
2018	Rhye	"Taste"	Blood
2018	Diplo	"Worry No More" feat. Lil Yachty and Santigold	California
2018	Alison Wonderland	"No"	Awake
2018	Sasha Sloan	"Hurt"	Sad Girl
2018	Sasha Sloan	"Here"	Sad Girl
2018	Nina Nesbitt	"Psychopath" with Sasha Sloan and Charlotte Lawrence	Spotify Singles
2018	Diplo	"Suicidal" feat. Desiigner	California
2018	LSD	"Audio"	LSD
2018	Diplo	"Stay Open" feat. MØ	Non-album single
2018	MØ	"Sun in Our Eyes" with Diplo	Forever Neverland
2018	Alex Hepburn	"High Roller"	If You Stay
2018	LANY	"Thru These Tears"	Malibu Nights
2018	RL Grime	"Light Me Up" feat. Julia Michaels and Miguel	Nova
2018	Santigold	"Valley of the Dolls"	I Don't Want: The Gold Fire Sessions
2018	LSD	"Thunderclouds"	LSD
2018	LANY	"I Don't Wanna Love You Anymore"	Malibu Nights
2018	Sasha Sloan	"The Only"	Loser
2018	Sasha Sloan	"Faking It"	Loser
2018	Pabllo Vittar	"Seu Crime"	Não Para Não
2018	LANY	"Run"	Malibu Nights
2018	Sasha Sloan	"Chasing Parties"	Loser
2018	Nao	"Curiosity"	Saturn
2018	Trippie Redd	"Toxic Waste"	A Love Letter to You 3
2018	Sasha Sloan	"Older"	Loser
2018	Sasha Sloan	"Version of Me"	Loser
2018	Sasha Sloan	"Again"	Loser
2019	LSD	"No New Friends"	LSD
2019	Diplo	"So Long" feat. Cam	Diplo Presents Thomas Wesley, Chapter 1: Snake Oil
2019	PnB Rock	"Swervin'" feat. Diplo	TrapStar Turnt PopStar
2019	Sasha Sloan	"Thoughts"	Self Portrait
2019	Miley Cyrus	"Cattitude" feat. RuPaul	She Is Coming
2019	Sasha Sloan	"Dancing with Your Ghost"	Self Portrait
2019	Sasha Sloan	"At Least I Look Cool"	Self Portrait
2019	NF	"Only" with Sasha Sloan	The Search
2019	DJ Snake	"No More" feat. Zhu	Carte Blanche
2019	Diplo	"Heartless" feat. Morgan Wallen	Diplo Presents Thomas Wesley, Chapter 1: Snake Oil
2019	Saint Jhn	"Trophies"	Ghetto Lenny's Love Songs
2019	Gerard Salas	"Falling Down"	Sad
2019	Sasha Sloan	"Smiling When I Die"	Self Portrait
2019	Diplo	"Lonely" with Jonas Brothers	Diplo Presents Thomas Wesley, Chapter 1: Snake Oil
2019	Sasha Sloan	"Thank God"	Self Portrait
2019	Sasha Sloan	"Keep On"	Self Portrait
2019	Sasha Sloan	"Too Sad to Cry"	Self Portrait
2019	James Arthur	"Sad Eyes"	You
2019	Meghan Trainor	"Workin' on It" feat. Sasha Sloan and Lennon Stella	Treat Myself
2020	Major Lazer	"Lay Your Head on Me" feat. Marcus Mumford	Music Is the Weapon
2020	Diplo	"Do Si Do" with Blanco Brown	Diplo Presents Thomas Wesley, Chapter 1: Snake Oil
2020	LANY	"Good Guys"	Mama's Boy
2020	Diplo	"On Mine" with Noah Cyrus	Diplo Presents Thomas Wesley, Chapter 1: Snake Oil
2020	Diplo	"Hometown" feat. Danielle Bradbery and Zac Brown	Diplo Presents Thomas Wesley, Chapter 1: Snake Oil
2020	Diplo	"Heartbreak" feat. Ben Burgess	Diplo Presents Thomas Wesley, Chapter 1: Snake Oil
2020	Sofia Carson	"Miss U More Than U Know" with R3hab	Non-album single
2020	LANY	"If This Is the Last Time"	Mama's Boy
2020	Y2K	"Damage Is Done" with JoJo	Non-album single
2020	Sasha Sloan	"Lie"	Only Child
2020	LANY	"You!"	Mama's Boy
2020	Sasha Sloan	"House with No Mirrors"	Only Child
2020	LANY	"Cowboy in LA"	Mama's Boy
2020	LANY	"Heart Won't Let Me"	Mama's Boy
2020	LANY	"Paper"	Mama's Boy
2020	LANY	"Sharing You"	Mama's Boy
2020	Kiiara	"So Sick" feat. blackbear	Lil Kiiwi
2020	Kiiara	"Accidental"	Lil Kiiwi
2020	Sasha Sloan	"Only Child"	Only Child
2020	Sasha Sloan	"Is It Just Me?"	Only Child
2020	Sasha Sloan	"Someone You Hate"	Only Child
2020	Sasha Sloan	"Until It Happens to You"	Only Child
2020	Sasha Sloan	"I Saw Mommy Kissing Santa Claus"	Non-album single
2020	Diplo	"Turn Back Time" with Sonny Fodera	Do You Dance?
2020	Trevor Dahl	"Best for Me"	Non-album single
2020	Diplo	"Bottle's Bout Dead" with ERNEST	Diplo Presents Thomas Wesley, Chapter 1: Snake Oil (Deluxe)
2021	Black Coffee	"Never Gonna Forget" with Diplo featuring Elderbrook	Subconsciously
2021	Aleyna Tilki	"Retrograde"	Non-album single
2021	Sasha Sloan	"When Was It Over?"	Non-album single
2021	Winnetka Bowling League	"Barcelona" with Sasha Sloan	Non-album single
