= Tino Schaedler =

German art director (born 1972)

- Born: 1972 (age 53–54)
- Education: Leibniz University Hannover; Berlage Institute; Vancouver Film School
- Occupation: Art director
- Website: tinoschaedler.com

Tino Schaedler (born 1972) is a German film art director specializing in digital sets. He was signed by Warner Brothers as a digital set director in 2003.

== Education and early career ==
Tino Schaedler has an academic background in architecture and visual effects. He graduated from the Leibniz University Hannover in architecture with honours, studied at the Berlage Institute in Amsterdam, UC Berkeley in the US and the Vancouver Film School. He has taught at the Berlin University of the Arts, the architecture department of UBC in Vancouver and the Architectural Association in London. In 2002 he co-founded studio digital analog with Michael J. Brown.

== Film ==
After working for three years in the offices of Daniel Libeskind and Barkow Leibinger architects his career took a turn and led him to film design. Since then he has worked on several big budget productions, such as Tim Burton's `Charlie and the Chocolate Factory‘,Catwoman, V for Vendetta and Harry Potter and the Order of the Phoenix and the upcoming New Line production The Golden Compass as art director for digital sets. He is currently working a book title and curating a traveling exhibition on contemporary film design. Recently, Tino has been featured in interviews and is holding talks at universities and conventions on digital set design.

== Fashion and concerts ==
Schaedler has worked in fashion, creating campaigns for brands such as Yves Saint Laurent and designing fashion runways. He has since worked on concerts for artists including Daft Punk, Lady Gaga, Travis Scott, The Weeknd, Lorde, André 3000, and Steve Lacy.
