= Thunderclouds (song) =

Single by LSD

from the album LSD
- Released: August 9, 2018
- Recorded: 2018
- Studio: Beachwood Park (Los Angeles); Lazer Sound (Beachwood Canyon); Conway (Los Angeles); Blender's Ends (Hamburg)
- Genre: Dance-pop
- Length: 3:07
- Label: Columbia
- Songwriter(s): Timothy McKenzie; Sia Furler; Thomas Wesley Pentz; Henry Agincourt Allen; Philip Meckseper
- Producer(s): Labrinth; Diplo; Jr Blender; King Henry

LSD singles chronology
"Audio" (2018)	"Thunderclouds" (2018)	"Mountains" (2018)

Music video
- "Thunderclouds" on YouTube

"Thunderclouds" is a song by pop music supergroup LSD. It was released on August 9, 2018, by Columbia Records as the third single from LSD's eponymously named debut studio album, following "Genius" and "Audio". The song was written by Labrinth, Sia, Diplo, King Henry and Jr Blender, and produced by Labrinth, Diplo, and Jr Blender.

"Thunderclouds" was used as the main theme song for the Samsung Galaxy Note 9 phablet promotional campaign, being featured extensively in parts in the company's ads, as well as at the reveal event in New York on August 9, 2018.

== Description ==
Lyrically, the song describes trust issues developing and tearing apart a relationship. The hurtful words spewed by a partner are related to a house fire and the titular thunderclouds formed during a storm. The pre-chorus and chorus are sung by both Sia and Labrinth, whereas the verses alternate between them.

== Music video ==
The official music video for the song, directed by Ernest Desumbila, was released on 30 August 2018. Billboard's review called the video "super trippy" and described it as follows: "The group travels across pink and purple skies inside a flying red car piloted by Diplo and housing a living Sia puppet. Labrinth flies on his own personal cloud - a very common theme taken from Chinese mythology - while a mysterious candy-haired girl, played by Maddie Ziegler, dances on top of the car with a Sia-inspired hair-do. The party encounters thunderstorms along the way. … With the power of love, the group eventually finds their way out of the storm and returns to the dazzling pink-clouded skies."

== Track listing ==
- Digital download
1. "Thunderclouds" (Lost Frequencies Remix) – 3:18
- Digital download
1. "Thunderclouds" (MK Remix) – 3:34

== Personnel ==
Credits adapted from Tidal.

- Sia – vocals, lyricist, composer, production
- Diplo – production, programming, lyricist, composer
- Labrinth – production, engineering, programming, vocals, lyricist, composer
- King Henry – production, programming, lyricist, composer
- Jr Blender – programming, preparation, lyricist, composer
- Manny Marroquin – mix engineering
- Chris Galland – mix engineering
- Randy Merrill – master engineering
- Bart Schoudel – engineering
- Robin Florent – engineering assistance
- Scott Desmarais – engineering assistance

== Charts ==
=== Weekly charts ===
Weekly chart performance for "Thunderclouds"
Chart (2018–2019)	Peak position
Australia (ARIA)	69
Austria (Ö3 Austria Top 40)	42
Belgium (Ultratip Bubbling Under Flanders)	1
Belgium (Ultratop 50 Wallonia)	37
Canada (Canadian Hot 100)	62
Croatia (HRT)	9
Czech Republic (Rádio – Top 100)	74
Czech Republic (Singles Digitál Top 100)	26
France (SNEP)	24
Germany (GfK)	56
Hungary (Editors' Choice Top 40)	10
Hungary (Single Top 40)	19
Hungary (Stream Top 40)	21
Ireland (IRMA)	8
Italy (FIMI)	23
Israel (Media Forest)	6
Japan (Japan Hot 100)	97
Lebanon (Lebanese Top 20)	6
Malaysia (RIM)	9
Mexico Airplay (Billboard)	10
New Zealand (Recorded Music NZ)	38
Norway (VG-lista)	29
Portugal (AFP)	66
Romania (Airplay 100)	11
Scotland (OCC)	11
Singapore (RIAS)	5
Slovakia (Rádio Top 100)	27
Slovakia (Singles Digitál Top 100)	15
Slovenia (SloTop50)	28
South Korea International Downloads (Gaon)	19
Sweden (Sverigetopplistan)	80
Switzerland (Schweizer Hitparade)	38
UK Singles (OCC)	17
Ukraine Airplay (TopHit)	45
US Billboard Hot 100	67
US Adult Pop Airplay (Billboard)	28
US Dance/Mix Show Airplay (Billboard)	19
US Pop Airplay (Billboard)	22

=== Year-end charts ===
Year-end chart performance for "Thunderclouds"
Chart (2018)	Position
Romania (Airplay 100)	97

== Certifications ==
Certifications for "Thunderclouds"
Region	Certification	Certified units/sales
Australia (ARIA)	Platinum	70,000^{‡}
Austria (IFPI Austria)	Platinum	30,000^{‡}
Canada (Music Canada)	Platinum	80,000^{‡}
Denmark (IFPI Danmark)	Gold	45,000^{‡}
France (SNEP)	Diamond	333,333^{‡}
Germany (BVMI)	Gold	200,000^{‡}
Italy (FIMI)	Platinum	50,000^{‡}
Mexico (AMPROFON)	2× Platinum	120,000^{‡}
New Zealand (RMNZ)	Platinum	30,000^{‡}
Poland (ZPAV)	Platinum	20,000^{‡}
Spain (PROMUSICAE)	Gold	30,000^{‡}
Switzerland (IFPI Switzerland)	Gold	10,000^{‡}
United Kingdom (BPI)	Gold	400,000^{‡}
United States (RIAA)	Platinum	1,000,000^{‡}
^{‡} Sales+streaming figures based on certification alone.

== See also ==
- Diplo discography
- Labrinth discography
- List of top 10 singles in 2018 (France)
- Sia discography
