= Bloodboy =

American musical project

Bloodboy is the musical project of Los Angeles–based musician Lexie Papilion.

When asked how she came up with the name Bloodboy, Papilion jokingly responded, "Eggplantdick was taken and it seemed like the next logical option," and then discussed initial resistance from band members regarding naming the band Bloodboy. Papilion said she wanted to choose a name that was "sort of funny, sort of bizarre, sort of true."

== Early life ==
Papilion began writing and recording music in elementary school. Her first original recording was a song reflecting on the terrorist attack on 9/11. She was enrolled in both piano and voice lessons from a young age and was involved in competitive opera singing. As a child, Papilion wanted to be a doctor and was even allowed to watch her uncle perform reconstructive knee surgery on a patient. Reflecting on this experience in an interview, Papilion stated "I remember being in awe of the complexity of the human body and I didn't understand the disgust or fear that most people experience at the sight of seeing the body exposed in this way. Then I decided to become a vampire."

In high school, Papilion focused on non-musical aspects of her life, including her career as a professional surfer. She competed on the United States surf team as a teenager, but was eventually dismissed after arriving intoxicated to a surf competition in Brazil at the age of 16.

Papilion attended college and graduated with a degree focusing on pre-law, but returned to music in her adulthood. This decision caused conflict with her mother, and their relationship is referenced on Bloodboy's track "Mom, I've Changed."

== Musical career ==
Papiliion's debut single as Bloodboy, titled "Human Female," was produced by Justin L. Raisen, an industry professional known for his work with pop sensations Charli XCX and Sky Ferreira.

Her next release was a single called "Hey Kid" and was inspired by the musical collaborations between David Bowie and Brian Eno. The track is about watching a loved one go through turmoil that you cannot help them out of. Papilion cited Bowie's 1977 album Low as sonic inspiration for the single.

The Papilion's debut EP Best of Bloodboy (2016) was recorded in Arnaudville, Louisiana, with producer Thom Monahan.

Papilion's single "Sex Crime" premiered online in Paper Magazine in 2018. Her album Punk Adjacent had been finished for more than a year before it was released.

== Musical style and influences ==
She describes her music as "if Joe Strummer and Debbie Harry had a baby who was raised by Ezra Koenig." Her lyrics challenge social norms such as gender roles and dating culture in the United States. Papilion's early work has been described as "visceral and raw," while incorporating elements of the post-punk and electro rock musical styles.

The musical style of Bloodboy has been compared to that of Yeah Yeah Yeahs' lead singer Karen O, rock musician Juliette Lewis, and Debbie Harry of Blondie. Papilion has been praised for her sense for melody and groove, evoking musical influences such as the Clash and David Bowie.

Papilion said that her song "Human Female" is not a "tale of survival" or a "feminist anthem." Instead, she says that the track is about "a person who happens to be a woman trying to figure out which type of life she wants to lead." The title of the single is a reflection on identity (or lack thereof). Papilion says that the single is not autobiographical in nature, but that she has struggled at times with similar issues of identity. Particularly, Papilion has mentioned her complicated relationship with her career as a musician, saying "Being an artist sucks a lot of times, but being a lawyer or an accountant would suck too so, ultimately, I chose the one with the type of suckiness I'm willing to endure for the less sucky parts that I love."

== Discography ==
=== LPs ===
- Punk Adjacent (2019)

=== EPs ===
- Best of Bloodboy (2016)

=== Singles ===
- Human Female (2016)
- Hey Kid (2016)
- Keep Your Disease (2016)
- Important to the World (2017)
- Sex Crime (2018)
- Is Now a Good Time to Ruin Your Life? (2018)
- All My Idiots (2018)
- Underground Girl (2019)
