= Dano Cerny =

Music video director

- Occupation: Music video director
- Years active: 2013–present
- Website: Official website

Dano Cerny is a music video director, known for his collaborations with musicians such as LSD (Labrinth, Sia & Diplo), The Chainsmokers, Halsey, Elle King, Galantis, Wrabel, Bebe Rexha, The Roots, and Bishop Briggs among others. He is a former child actor who starred in such horror films as Demonic Toys, and Children of the Corn 3: Urban Harvest, credited as Daniel Cerny. He was nominated for the MTV Video Music Award for Best Direction for LSD's "No New Friends" video.

== Music videography ==
Year	Artist	Video
2013	Galantis	"Smile"
2013	Far East Movement	"Change Your Life"
2013	TV on the Radio	"Killer Crane"
2014	Galantis	"You"
2014	Sidney Samson & Eva Simons	"Celebrate the Rain"
2014	The Roots	"Never"
2014	Matt Simons	"Tear it Up"
2014	Alex Adair	"Make Me Feel Better"
2015	Galantis	"Runaway (U & I)"
2015	Matt Simons	"You Can Come Back Home"
2015	Alyxx Dione ft. Jason Derulo	"Chingalinga"
2015	Galantis	"Peanut Butter Jelly"
2015	Erik Hassle	"Natural Born Lovers"
2015	Sigma & Diztortion ft. Jacob Banks	"Redemption"
2015	Galantis	"In My Head"
2015	Charles Hamilton ft. Laurel	"Down the Line"
2015	Tori Kelly	"Hollow"
2016	Tritonal	"Blackout"
2016	Tritonal	"This Is Love"
2016	Grace	"Hell of a Girl"
2016	Elle King	"Good Girls"
2016	Broods	"Heartlines"
2016	Maty Noyes	"In My Mind"
2016	Galantis & Hook n Sling	"Love on Me"
2016	The Chainsmokers ft. Halsey	"Closer"
2017	Jidenna	"The Let Out"
2017	Jidenna	"Bambi"
2017	Pentatonix	"Bohemian Rhapsody"
2017	Wrabel	"The Village"
2017	Loote	"High Without Your Love"
2017	Superfruit	"Goodbye From Lonely"
2017	Bishop Briggs	"Dream"
2018	Sigala, Ella Eyre & Meghan Trainor ft. French Montana	"Just Got Paid"
2018	Galantis	"Emoji"
2018	LSD (Labrinth, Sia & Diplo)	"No New Friends"
2020	Keith Urban	"Polaroid"
2021	Reba McEntire featuring Dolly Parton	"Does He Love You"
2024	Sia featuring Kylie Minogue	"Dance Alone"
2024	Rita Ora	"Ask & You Shall Receive"
2024	Lainey Wilson	"Hang Tight Honey"
2026	Kylie Cantrall	"Carrie Bradshaw"
