= Jr Blender =

German songwriter and procuer

- Born: Philip Meckseper
- Origin: Hamburg, Germany
- Genres: Reggae; dancehall; pop; hip hop; moombahton; EDM; electropop
- Occupations: Record producer; songwriter
- Years active: 2009–present

Philip Meckseper, known professionally as Jr Blender (sometimes stylised as Jr. Blender or Junior Blender), is a German record producer and songwriter from Hamburg.

He is notable for his collaborations with American dance music group Major Lazer. His credits include the singles Lean On (with DJ Snake and MØ), Cold Water (with Justin Bieber and MØ), Run Up (with Nicki Minaj and PartyNextDoor), Light It Up (with Nyla and Fuse ODG) and All My Love (with Ariana Grande and Machel Montano).

Meckseper started his career as a member of the German sound clash group Supersonic. He came to the attention of Diplo during this time, thanks to remixes of tracks by Rihanna and Bruno Mars.

In addition to his pop music credentials, Meckseper has a history of collaborating with reggae and dancehall artists; acting either as a writer or producer, or both. To date, his reggae and dancehall credits include songs by Damian Marley, Sean Paul, Protoje, Chronixx, Gyptian, Lutan Fyah, Romain Virgo, Stylo G, Burro Banton, Exco Levi, Christopher Martin, Jah Vinci, Perfect Giddimani, Tony Rebel, Beenie Man and Luciano.

In 2019, Meckseper won a Grammy award for "Best Dance Recording" for the Silk City & Dua Lipa Song "Electricity".

== Songwriting and production credits ==
Title	Year	Artist(s)	Album	Credits	Written with	Produced with
"Smile Jamaica"	2013	Chronixx, Silly Walks Discoteque	Smile Jamaica	Producer	-	-
"Lean On" (featuring MØ)	2015	Major Lazer & DJ Snake	Peace Is the Mission	Co-writer	Thomas Pentz, Marie Ørsted, William Grigahcine, Steve Guess	-
"Light It Up Remix" (featuring Nyla & Fuse ODG)	2015	Major Lazer	Peace Is the Mission	Co-writer/Producer	Thomas Pentz, Nailah Thorbourne, Nana Abiona, Sydney Swift, T-Baby, David Malcolm	Diplo
"Thunder and Lightning" (featuring Gent & Jawns)	2015	Major Lazer	Peace Is the Mission	Co-writer/Producer	Thomas Pentz, Long Phung, William Bennet, Clifton Gibbs, Coxsone Dodd	Diplo, Gent & Jawns
"Boom" (featuring Ty Dolla $ign, Wizkid and Kranium)	2015	Major Lazer, MOTi	Peace Is the Mission	Co-writer/Producer	Thomas Pentz, Timo Romme, Kemar Donaldson, Tyrone Griffin Jr., Ayodeji Balogun	Major Lazer, MOTi
"Wave" (featuring Kali Uchis)	2015	Major Lazer	Peace Is the Mission	Co-writer/Producer	Thomas Pentz, Karly-Marina Loaiza, Victor Axelrod	Major Lazer, Ticklah
"All My Love Remix" (featuring Ariana Grande and Machel Montano)	2015	Major Lazer	Peace Is the Mission	Co-writer/Producer	Thomas Pentz, Karen Marie Ørsted, Boaz de Jong, Ella Yelich-O'Connor, Ariana Grande, Machel Montano, Gamal Doyle	Major Lazer, Boaz van de Beatz
"Blaze Up the Fire" (featuring Chronixx)	2015	Major Lazer	Peace Is the Mission	Co-writer/Producer	Jamar McNaughton, Thomas Pentz, Leighton Walsh	-
"Cold Water" (featuring Justin Bieber & MØ)	2015	Major Lazer	Non-album single	Co-writer/Producer	Edward Christopher Sheeran, Benjamin Levin, Karen Marie Ørsted, Thomas Pentz, Justin Bieber, Jamie Scott, Henry Allen	Major Lazer, Benny Blanco, King Henry
"Love Me Long" (featuring Major Lazer, Gyptian)	2016	Elliphant	Living Life Golden	Co-writer/Producer	Ellinor Olovsdotter, Windel Edwards, Andy Price, Erik Hassle, Thomas Pentz	Pfannenstill, Diplo
"Know No Better" (featuring Travis Scott, Camila Cabello, and Quavo)	2017	Major Lazer	Know No Better EP	Co-writer/Producer	Brittany Hazzard, Thomas Pentz, Henry Allen, Jacques Webster, Camila Cabello, Quavious Marshall	Diplo, King Henry
"Run Up" (featuring Nicki Minaj and PartyNextDoor	2017	Major Lazer	Music Is the Weapon	Co-writer/Producer	Thomas Pentz, Onika Maraj, Tor Erik Hermansen, Mikkel Storleer Eriksen, Jahron Anthony Brathwaite	Major Lazer, Stargate
"Tip Pon It"	2017	Major Lazer, Sean Paul	Mad Love the Prequel EP	Co-writer/Producer	Ashanti Reid, Thomas Pentz, Sean Henriques, Boaz de Jong	Diplo, Boaz van de Beatz
"Waterfall" (featuring P!nk and Sia)	2017	Stargate	Non-album single	Co-writer/Producer	Thomas Pentz, Sia Furler, Mikkel Storleer Eriksen, Tor Erik Hermansen	Stargate
"Stone Cold Lover"	2017	Stylo G	Ten Years Later EP	Co-writer/Producer	Jason McDermott, Vania Khaleh-Pari	-
"Particula" (feat DJ Maaphorisa, Nasty C, Ice Prince, Patoranking & Jidenna)	2017	Major Lazer	Know No Better EP	Co-writer/Producer	-	Thomas Wesley Pentz
"Window Seat"	2017	Fuse ODG	Non-album single	Co-writer/Producer	Yannick Rastogi, Zacharie Raymond, Adam Baptiste, Nana Abiona	Banx & Ranx
"Get It Right Remix" (featuring MØ and GoldLink)	2018	Diplo	California EP	Co-producer	-	Diplo, King Henry
"Audio"	2018	LSD	Non-album single	Co-writer/Producer	Thomas Pentz, Sia Furler, Gustav Rudman, Timothy McKenzie, Henry Allen	Diplo, King Henry
"Genius"	2018	LSD	Non-album single	Co-writer/Producer	Thomas Pentz, Sia Furler, Timothy McKenzie	Diplo, Labrinth
"Stay Open" (featuring MØ)	2018	Diplo	Non-album single	Co-writer/Producer	Thomas Pentz, Henry Allen, Ilsey Juber, Karen Marie Orsted	Diplo, King Henry
"Let Me Live" (feat Anne-Marie & Mr Eazi)	2018	Major Lazer, Rudimental	Toast To Our Differences	Co-writer	Thomas Wesley Pentz, Jasper Helderman, Kesi Dryden, Piers Aggett, Amir Amor, Will Grands, Alvaro, Leon Rolle, Cesar Ovalle Jr., Bas van Daalen, Oluwatosin Oluwole Ajibade, Anne-Marie	-
"Feel About You" (featuring Mapei)	2018	Silk City	Non-album single	Co-writer/Producer	Thomas Pentz, Mark Ronson, Jacqueline Mapei Cummings	Diplo, Mark Ronson
"Miss You"	2018	Major Lazer, Tory Lanez and Cashmere Cat	TBA	Co-producer	-	Major Lazer, Cashmere Cat
"Thunderclouds"	2018	LSD	Labrinth, Sia & Diplo Present... LSD	Co-writer	Thomas Pentz, Sia Furler, Henry Allen, Timothy McKenzie	-
"Electricity"	2018	Silk City and Dua Lipa	Dua Lipa: Complete Edition	Co-writer/Producer	Mark Ronson, Thomas Wesley Pentz, Romy Madley Croft, Diana Gordon, Dua Lipa, Jacob Olofsson, Rami Dawod, Maxime Picard, Clément Richard	Silk City, The Picard Brothers, Jarami, Riton, Alex Metric
"Don’t Lie to Me"	2019	Lena	Non-album single	Producer	Chima Ede, David Hofmann, Joachim Piehl, Jonas Lang, Lena Meyer-Landrut, Levin Dennler, Martin Willumeit, Matt James, Vania Khaleh-Pari	Jugglerz
! (Exclamation Mark)	2019	TRIPPIE REDD	!	Co-Producer	-	Diplo
"Lonely"	2019	Diplo ft. Jonas Brothers	Diplo Presents Thomas Wesley, Chapter 1: Snake Oil	Producer	Thomas Pentz, Joseph Jonas, Nicholas Jonas, Kevin Jonas II, Ryan Tedder, Henry Allen	Diplo, King Henry, Ryan Tedder
"Dance With Me" (feat Thomas Rhett & Young Thug)	2020	Diplo	Diplo Presents Thomas Wesley, Chapter 1: Snake Oil	Co-Producer	-	Thomas Pentz, King Henry, Ryan Tedder, Zach Skelton
"Titans" (feat. Sia & Labrinth)	2020	Major Lazer	Music Is The Weapon (Reloaded)	Co-Writer	Sia Furler, Boaz Van De Beatz, Thomas Wesley Pentz, Timothy McKenzie, Yonatan Goldstein	
"Hell and High Water" (feat Diplo & Alessia Cara)	2020	Major Lazer	Music Is The Weapon (Reloaded)	Co-Producer	-	Thomas Wesley Pentz, Jasper Helderman, Bas Van Daalen
"Trigger" (feat Khalid, Death Standing & TimeFall)	2020	Major Lazer	Music Is The Weapon (Reloaded)	Co-Producer	-	Diplo, Alvaro, Bas Van Daalen
"Looking for Me" (feat Diplo & Kareen Lomax)"	2021	Paul Woolford	Looking For Me (Single)	Co-Writer	Naija Kareen Lomax, Paul Woolford, Thomas Pentz	-
