= Genius (LSD song) =

2018 debut single by LSD

Single by LSD

from the album LSD
- Released: 3 May 2018
- Recorded: 2018
- Studio: Beachwood Park (Los Angeles); Lazer Sound (Beachwood Canyon); Blender's Ends (Hamburg)
- Genre: Electronic; pop; psychedelia; trip hop
- Length: 3:33
- Label: Columbia
- Songwriters: Sia Furler; Timothy McKenzie; Thomas Wesley Pentz; Philip Meckseper
- Producers: Gustave Rudman; Diplo; Labrinth; Jr Blender

LSD singles chronology
"Genius" (2018)	"Audio" (2018)

Music video
- "Genius" on YouTube

"Genius" is the debut single by pop music supergroup LSD, released on 3 May 2018. It is from the group's 2019 debut studio album, LSD. The song was written by Sia, Labrinth, Diplo and Jr Blender, and produced by the last three with Gustave Rudman. The song impacted the US alternative radios on 19 June 2018. The song is featured in the video games FIFA 19 and FIFA 23 by EA Sports.

The single was accompanied with a "psychedelic" animated music video directed by Ben Jones, featuring art by Gabriel Alcala. A remixed version of "Genius" featuring American rapper Lil Wayne was released in January 2019.

== Composition ==
"Genius"
A 21-second sample from the chorus of "Genius" by LSD.

Stereogum said the song has an "eclectic, loosely Caribbean production". Dancing Astronaut described the song as "Labrinth and Sia swapping syncopated versework over a characteristically catchy hip-hop lite Diplo beat." Rolling Stone called it "a distinctly Diplo synth-pop drop". Lyrically, the song references Albert Einstein, Galileo Galilei, Stephen Hawking, and Isaac Newton.

== Music video ==
Produced by the company Bento Box Entertainment, illustrated by Gabriel Alcala and directed by Ben Jones (creator of The Problem Solverz and Stone Quackers), "Genius" is a surreal animated cartoon, influences from an American Pop Artist, Peter Max and Heinz Edelmann, who designed for the Beatles's animated musical film, Yellow Submarine. Characters are 2D, boldly colored caricatures of LSD members and anthropomorphic animals. Historical geniuses such as Steve Jobs and Leonardo da Vinci are also referenced, depicted as humanoid mice (mice being a recurring motif in LSD animations). The scenes follow a psychedelic, non-chronological storyline lightly tied to the lyrics, and symbolic animals such as three-eyed tigers and human-like mice are present throughout the video.

== Track listing ==
- Digital download – Banx & Ranx Remixes
1. "Genius" (Banx & Ranx Remix) – 2:57
2. "Genius" (Banx & Ranx Reggae Remix) – 3:14
- Digital download
1. "Genius" (Lil Wayne Remix) (featuring Lil Wayne) – 2:42

== Personnel ==
Credits adapted from Tidal.

- Diplo – production, programming
- Labrinth – production, engineering, programming
- Jr Blender – production, programming
- Gustave Rudman – production
- Manny Marroquin – mix engineering
- Chris Galland – mix engineering
- Randy Merrill – master engineering
- Bart Schoudel – engineering
- Luke Dimond – engineering
- Robin Florent – engineering assistance
- Scott Desmarais – engineering assistance

== Charts ==
Chart performance for "Genius"
Chart (2018–2019)	Peak position
Austria (Ö3 Austria Top 40)	66
Canada Hot 100 (Billboard)	75
Czech Republic Singles Digital (ČNS IFPI)	54
El Salvador (Monitor Latino)	17
France (SNEP)	173
Germany (GfK)	79
Hungary (Single Top 40)	38
Hungary (Stream Top 40)	10
Israel (Media Forest)	1
Lebanon (Lebanese Top 20)	2
New Zealand Heatseekers (RMNZ)	3
Romania (Airplay 100)	52
Slovakia Singles Digital (ČNS IFPI)	36
Sweden (Sverigetopplistan)	81
Switzerland (Schweizer Hitparade)	84
UK Singles (OCC)	72

== Certifications ==
Certifications for "Genius"
Region	Certification	Certified units/sales
Australia (ARIA)	Platinum	70,000^{‡}
Austria (IFPI Austria)	Gold	15,000^{‡}
Canada (Music Canada)	Platinum	80,000^{‡}
France (SNEP)	Gold	100,000^{‡}
Italy (FIMI)	Gold	25,000^{‡}
Mexico (AMPROFON)	Platinum	60,000^{‡}
New Zealand (RMNZ)	Platinum	30,000^{‡}
Poland (ZPAV)	Platinum	20,000^{‡}
Spain (Promusicae)	Gold	30,000^{‡}
United Kingdom (BPI)	Silver	200,000^{‡}
United States (RIAA)	Platinum	1,000,000^{‡}
^{‡} Sales+streaming figures based on certification alone.

== Lil Wayne remix ==
"Genius (Lil Wayne Remix)"

Single by LSD featuring Lil Wayne

from the album LSD
- Released: January 17, 2019
- Recorded: 2018
- Studio: YM (Miami) (add.)
- Length: 2:43
- Label: Columbia
- Songwriter: Lil Wayne (add.)

Lil Wayne singles chronology
"Pistol on My Side (P.O.M.S.)" (2018)	"Genius" (Lil Wayne Remix) (2019)	"Don’t Cry" (2019)

Music video
- "Genius" (Lil Wayne Remix) on YouTube

"Genius (Lil Wayne Remix)", featuring American rapper Lil Wayne, was the first official remix of "Genius". It was released on January 17, 2019, by Columbia Records and featured on LSD's debut studio album, LSD (2019).

=== Music video ===
On January 17, 2019, the official music video of "Genius" (Lil Wayne Remix) was released on the official Vevo channel of the group.

=== Remix personnel ===
Credits adapted from Tidal.

- Lil Wayne – guest vocals, lyrics
- Sia Furler – lyrics, composition
- Timothy McKenzie – composition
- Philip Meckseper – composition
- Diplo – production, programming, composition
- Labrinth – production, engineering, programming
- Jr Blender – production, programming
- Gustave Rudman – miscellaneous production
- Manny Galvez – recording engineering
- John Hanes – mix engineering
- Serban Ghenea – mix engineering
- Randy Merrill – master engineering
- Bart Schoudel – engineering
- Luke Dimond – engineering
- Robin Florent – engineering assistance
- Scott Desmarais – engineering assistance

== See also ==
- Diplo discography
- Labrinth discography
- Sia discography
