= Audio (song) =

Single by LSD

from the album LSD
- Released: 10 May 2018
- Recorded: 2018
- Studio: Beachwood Park (Los Angeles); Lazer Sound (Beachwood Canyon); Janitor (London); Blender's Ends (Hamburg)
- Genre: Electronic; pop; psychedelia
- Length: 3:23
- Label: Columbia
- Songwriters: Sia Furler; Philip Meckseper; Thomas Wesley Pentz; Timothy McKenzie; Henry Agincourt Allen
- Producers: Labrinth; King Henry; Gustave Rudman; Diplo; Jr Blender (co.)

LSD singles chronology
"Genius" (2018)	"Audio" (2018)	"Thunderclouds" (2018)

Music video
- "Audio" on YouTube

"Audio" is a song by pop music group LSD. The song was released on 10 May 2018, and marks the group's second release, following "Genius".

== Music video ==
The song's music video was directed by Ernest Desumbila. It opens with Diplo purchasing a used BMW 8 Series and finding a fresh LSD tape in the glovebox. As he hits play on "Audio", the clip jumps to a young girl walking home from school, who encounters an animated Sia balloon floating through the air. The girl takes the balloon with her to a sprawling parking lot, where a dance routine breaks out once the "Audio" chorus drops. More psychedelic animations fill the scenery as Diplo speeds through the parched Los Angeles riverbed and Labrinth wanders the otherwise empty city.

This song was featured in Fortnite's Ariana Grande Concert in 2021. It is included on the NBA 2K20 video game soundtrack.

== Track listing ==
- Digital download
1. "Audio" (CID Remix) – 2:41

== Personnel ==
Credits adapted from Tidal.

- Diplo – production, programming
- Labrinth – production, engineering, programming
- King Henry – production, programming
- Jr Blender – programming, co-production
- Gustave Rudman – production
- Manny Marroquin – mix engineering
- Chris Galland – mix engineering
- Randy Merrill – master engineering
- Bart Schoudel – engineering
- Robin Florent – engineering assistance
- Scott Desmarais – engineering assistance

== Charts ==
=== Weekly charts ===
Chart (2018)	Peak position
Australia (ARIA)	91
Australia Hitseekers (ARIA)	1
Belgium (Ultratip Bubbling Under Wallonia)	23
Croatia Airplay (HRT)	79
Czech Republic Airplay (ČNS IFPI)	58
Czech Republic Singles Digital (ČNS IFPI)	47
France (SNEP)	35
Hungary (Stream Top 40)	30
Ireland (IRMA)	98
Netherlands (Single Top 100)	71
New Zealand Heatseekers (RMNZ)	4
Norway (VG-lista)	22
Portugal (AFP)	94
Slovakia Singles Digital (ČNS IFPI)	57
Sweden (Sverigetopplistan)	69
Switzerland (Schweizer Hitparade)	75
US Dance Airplay (Billboard)	27

=== Year-end charts ===
Chart (2018)	Position
France (SNEP)	121

== Certifications ==
Region	Certification	Certified units/sales
Australia (ARIA)	Platinum	70,000^{‡}
Canada (Music Canada)	Platinum	80,000^{‡}
France (SNEP)	Platinum	200,000^{‡}
Mexico (AMPROFON)	Gold	30,000^{‡}
New Zealand (RMNZ)	Gold	15,000^{‡}
Poland (ZPAV)	Platinum	20,000^{‡}
United States (RIAA)	Gold	500,000^{‡}
^{‡} Sales+streaming figures based on certification alone.

== Release history ==
Region	Date	Format	Label	Ref.
Various	10 May 2018	Digital download	Columbia	
Italy	15 June 2018	Contemporary hit radio	Sony	
United States	26 June 2018	Contemporary hit radio	Columbia	

== See also ==
- Diplo discography
- Labrinth discography
- Sia discography
