= LSD (group) =

Supergroup by Labrinth, Sia, and Diplo (2018–2019)

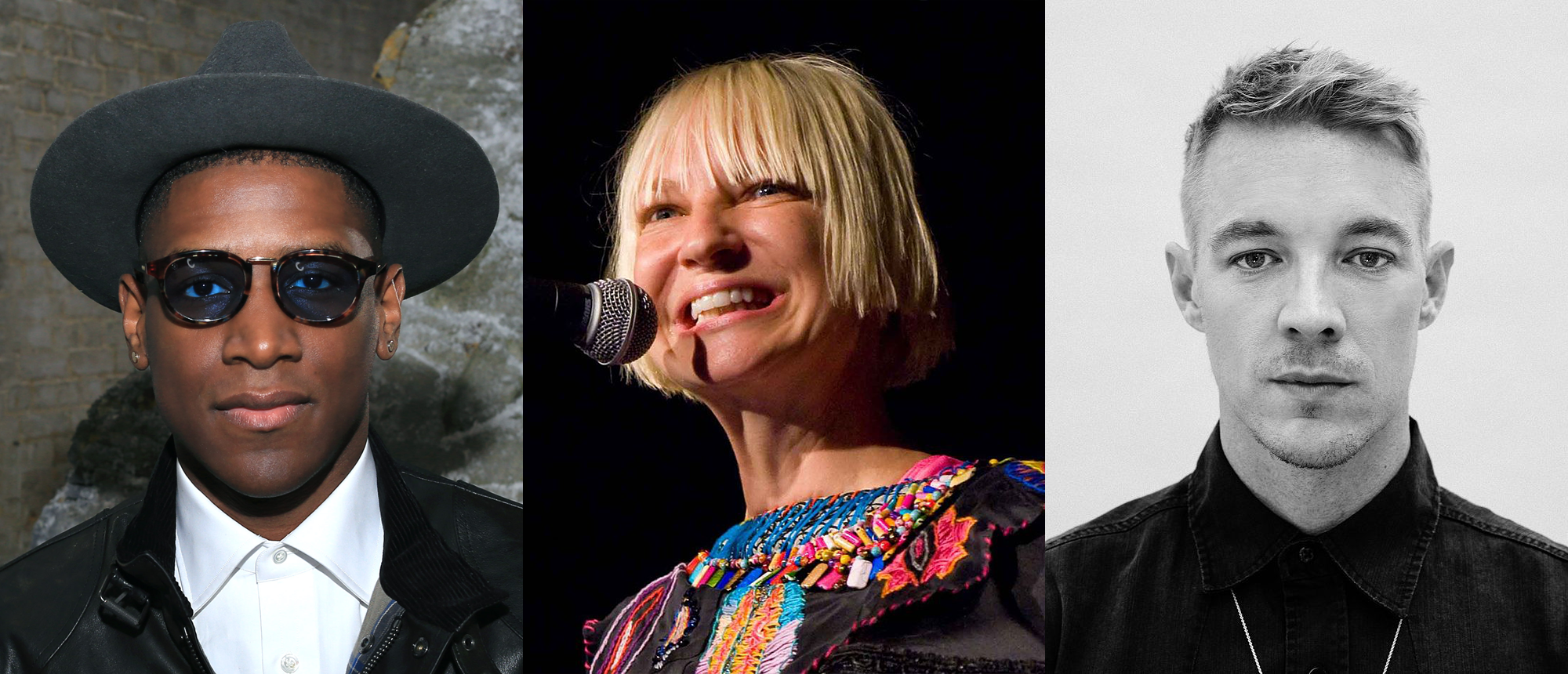
- The members of LSD, from left to right: Labrinth, Sia and Diplo

Background information
- Genres: Electronic; pop; power pop; psychedelic
- Years active: 2018–2019
- Labels: Syco; Columbia
- Members: Labrinth; Sia; Diplo
- Website: droppinglsd.com

LSD is a supergroup consisting of British singer and musician Labrinth, Australian singer-songwriter Sia and American music producer Diplo. The ensemble has released six singles (one of them a remix of their song "Genius"), all of which appear on their self-titled debut album, released on 12 April 2019.

== History ==
On 11 March 2018, Diplo posted, to Instagram, a photo of a cassette tape with the letters "LSD" marked on it; in the caption, he tagged Sia and Labrinth. On 3 May 2018, LSD released their debut single, "Genius", along with an animated music video. The following day, Diplo revealed that LSD was formed when he was invited to write a song with Labrinth and Sia. Diplo said: "Originally, I wasn't in [LSD] and then our publisher had the idea to throw me in there; those two artists, together, are two of the craziest, most creative people I ever met in my life. I think they have the most severe attention deficit disorder together, their ideas are so crazy, so I helped put their ideas together, taking the job of their producer."

On 10 May, they debuted the song "Audio", as well as its music video. On 6 August, Sia teased the release of a new track titled "Thunderclouds", which was released three days later, on 9 August. LSD released the song "Mountains" on 1 November 2018. Talking to Rolling Stone in November 2018, Sia revealed that the group would release an album. The album, Labrinth, Sia & Diplo Present... LSD, was released on 12 April 2019 through Columbia Records.

In October 2020, Diplo stated via Twitter (now X) that LSD hoped to return for a new project.

Labrinth is featured on the track "Incredible", on Sia's album Reasonable Woman.

== Discography ==
=== Studio albums ===
Title	Details	Peak chart positions									
Title	Details	AUS	BEL (FL)	GER	IRE	ITA	NLD	NZ	SWE	UK	US
Labrinth, Sia & Diplo Present... LSD	Released: 12 April 2019; Label: Columbia; Formats: CD, LP, digital download	49	72	49	45	53	16	35	17	44	70

=== Remix albums ===
List of remix albums, with selected details
Title	Details
Remixes	Released: 29 November 2024; Label: Columbia; Format: LP

=== Singles ===
List of singles, with selected chart positions, showing year released and album name
Title	Year	Peak chart positions										Certifications	Album
Title	Year	AUS	CAN	FRA	GER	ITA	NZ	SWE	SWI	UK	US	Certifications	Album
"Genius"	2018	—	75	173	79	—	— (Note: "Genius" did not enter the NZ Top 40 Singles Chart, but peaked at number three on the NZ Heatseeker Singles Chart.)	81	84	72	—	BPI: Silver; ARIA: Platinum; FIMI: Gold; MC: Platinum; RIAA: Gold; RMNZ: Platinum; SNEP: Gold	Labrinth, Sia & Diplo Present... LSD
"Audio"	2018	91	—	34	—	—	— (Note: "Audio" did not enter the NZ Top 40 Singles Chart, but peaked at number three on the NZ Heatseeker Singles Chart.)	69	75	—	—	RIAA: Gold; ARIA: Platinum; MC: Gold; RMNZ: Gold; SNEP: Platinum	Labrinth, Sia & Diplo Present... LSD
"Thunderclouds"	2018	69	62	3	56	24	38	80	38	17	67	ARIA: Platinum; BPI: Gold; BVMI: Gold; FIMI: Platinum; MC: Platinum; RIAA: Platinum; RMNZ: Platinum; SNEP: Platinum	Labrinth, Sia & Diplo Present... LSD
"Mountains"	2018	—	—	—	—	—	—	—	—	—	—		Labrinth, Sia & Diplo Present... LSD
"No New Friends"	2019	—	—	173	—	—	— (Note: "No New Friends" did not enter the NZ Top 40 Singles Chart, but peaked at number 10 on the NZ Hot Singles Chart.)	— (Note: "No New Friends" did not enter the Swedish Singellista Chart, but peaked at number eight on the Swedish Heatseeker Chart.)	—	—	—		Labrinth, Sia & Diplo Present... LSD
"—" denotes a recording that did not chart or was not released in that territory.

=== Other charted songs ===
List of other charted songs, with selected chart positions, showing year released and album name
Title	Year	Peak chart positions	Album
Title	Year	NZ Hot	Album
"Heaven Can Wait"	2019	26	Labrinth, Sia & Diplo Present... LSD

=== Music videos ===
Title	Year	Director(s)	Ref.
"Genius"	2018	Ben Jones	
"Audio"	2018	Ernest Desumbila	
"Thunderclouds"	2018	Ernest Desumbila	
"No New Friends"	2019	Dano Cerny	

== Awards and nominations ==
Award	Year	Category	Nominee(s)	Result	Ref.
Berlin Music Video Awards	2019	Best Art Director	Toni Soul (for "Thunderclouds")	Won	
