= Beachwood Canyon, Los Angeles =

Beachwood Canyon
- Neighborhood of Los Angeles
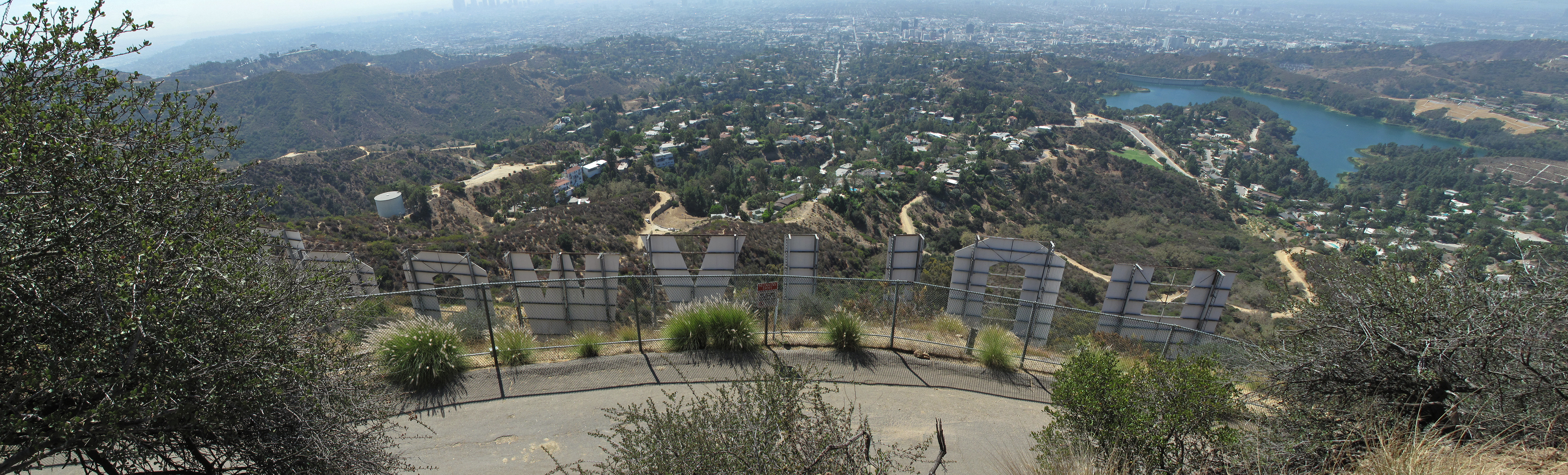
- Beachwood Canyon, as seen from the Hollywood Sign

- Location within Central Los Angeles
- Coordinates: 34.113556°N 118.321329°W
- Country: United States
- State: California
- County: Los Angeles
- City: Los Angeles
- Time zone: UTC-8 (PST)
  - Summer (DST): UTC-7 (PDT)

Beachwood Canyon is a community in the Hollywood Hills, in the northern portion of Hollywood in Los Angeles, California. The upper portion of the canyon is the Hollywoodland community that was advertised in the 1920s by the original of what is now known as the Hollywood Sign. The neighborhood features its own market, cafe, private mailbox rental, florist and stables.

== History ==
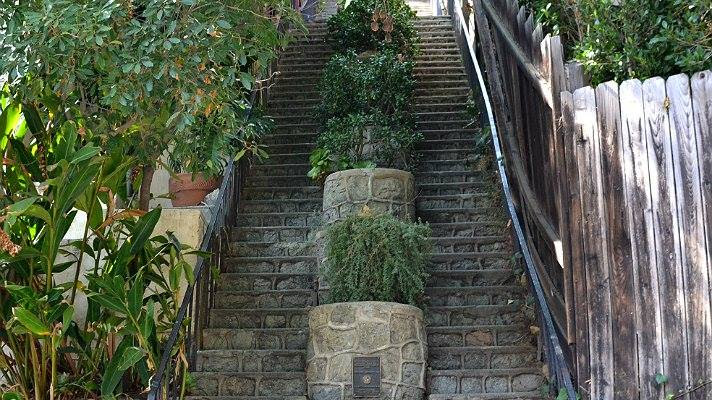
Saroyan Stairs in Beachwood Canyon

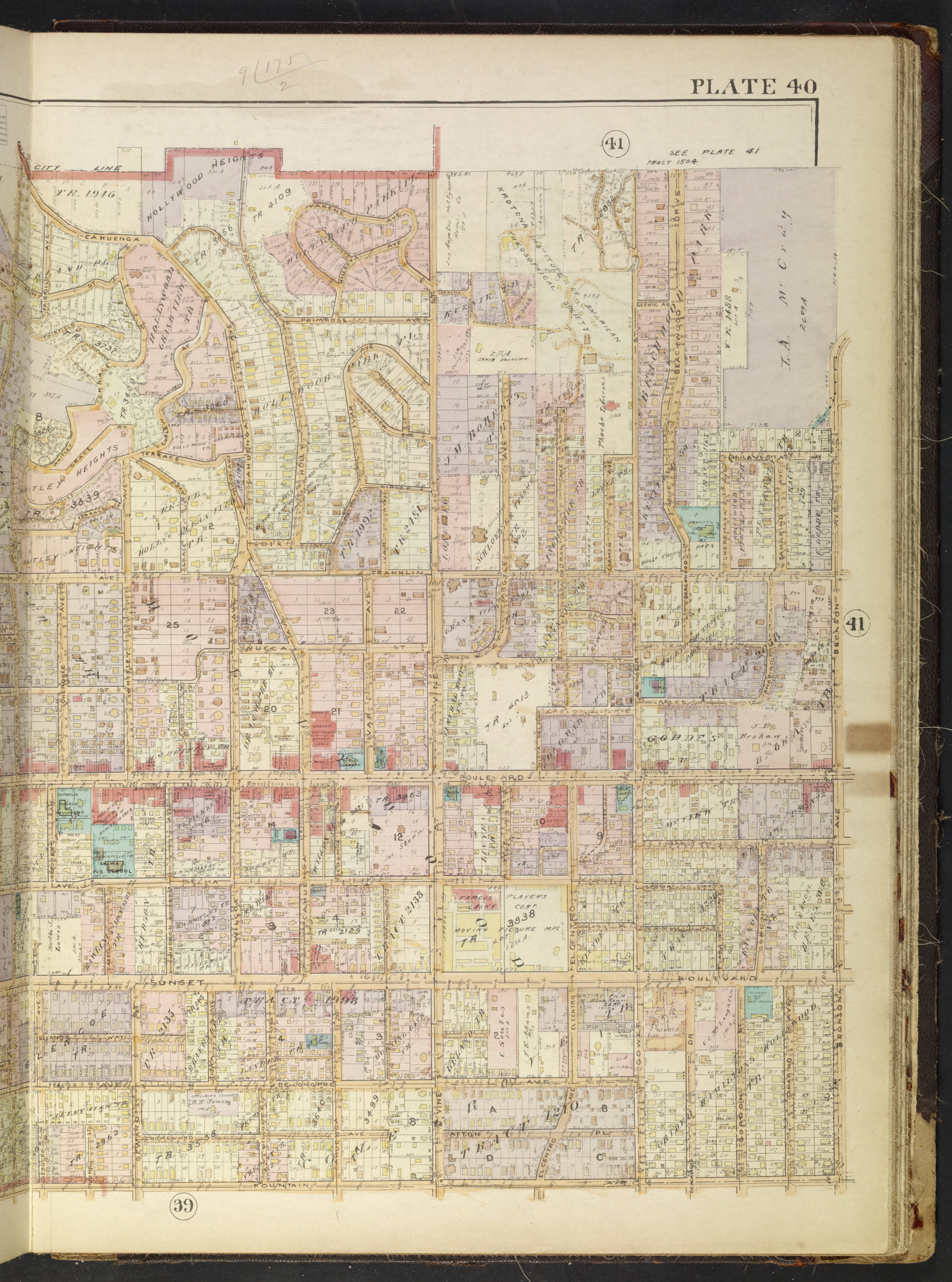
Beachwood Canyon and Whitley Heights, 1921

Home to more than 22,000 residents, Beachwood Canyon was first developed in the 1920s by a syndicate composed of West Hollywood's founder, Gen. M. H. Sherman; Los Angeles Times publisher Harry Chandler; and real estate mogul Sidney Woodruff (who also developed Dana Point). The architects and landscapers who developed the enclave drew inspiration from the southern regions of France, Italy and Spain, as well as the turreted castles of Germany, building in the Storybook house architectural style.

Film directors have favored the canyon over the years, so movies such as the original Invasion of the Body Snatchers (1956) were filmed there, with terrorized masses running down Belden Drive.

== Notable residents (past and present) ==
- Steve Agee, comedian, actor, writer
- Kevin Bacon, actor
- Ned Beatty, actor
- Jamie Bell, actor
- Jack Black, actor
- Humphrey Bogart, actor
- Adam Carolla, radio and television personality
- Guy Chambers, English songwriter and record producer
- Steve Coogan, English comic actor
- Lisa Coleman, musician
- Charlie Chaplin
- David Cook, musician and winner of American Idol
- Chris D'Elia, American actor and comedian
- Mac Danzig, American mixed-martial artist
- William De Los Santos, poet, screenwriter and film director
- Alexandre Desplat, composer
- Peter Deuel, actor
- Minnie Driver, actress
- Gustavo Dudamel, music director of the Los Angeles Philharmonic
- Fred Durst, musician
- James Duval, actor
- Peg Entwistle, Broadway actress who died by suicide from atop the HOLLYWOODLAND sign in 1932
- Barrett Foa, actor, singer, and dancer
- Peter Freeman, multi-instrumentalist and music producer
- Anna Friel, actress
- George Furth, actor
- Troy Garity, actor
- Kim Gardner, singer and restaurateur
- Heather Graham, actress
- Halsey, singer
- Aldous Huxley, English writer and novelist
- Laura Huxley, author and lecturer
- Maynard James Keenan, singer and songwriter
- Anna Kendrick, actress
- Anthony Kiedis, singer and songwriter
- Regina King, actress and director
- Mila Kunis, actress
- Heath Ledger, actor
- Bobby Lee, comedian, actor
- Sharmagne Leland-St. John, poet, author, filmmaker, concert performer
- David Livingston, television director and producer
- Bela Lugosi, actor
- Lykke Li, singer
- Madonna, singer, actress, and director
- Jason Mantzoukas, actor
- Ray Manzarek, singer and songwriter
- Chris Matthews, political commentator
- Jack McBrayer, actor
- Wendy Melvoin, Musician
- Thomas Middleditch, actor
- Moby, musician, DJ, and photographer
- D.W. Moffett, actor, writer, and director
- Jack Nitzsche, musician, composer
- Bob Odenkirk, actor and writer
- Hal Ozsan, actor
- Teresa Palmer, actress
- Nasim Pedrad, actress
- Aubrey Plaza, actress
- Keanu Reeves, actor
- Margot Robbie, actress and film producer
- William N. Robson, musician and radio producer
- Howard A. Rodman, screenwriter and novelist
- Samantha Ronson, DJ
- Axl Rose, musician
- Camille Rowe, model
- Andy Samberg, comedian, and Joanna Newsom, musician
- Ben Schwartz, comedian, actor
- Grant Show, actor
- Jessica Simpson, singer, actor
- Brooke Smith, actress
- Michael Sopkiw, actor
- Ralph Story, radio and television personality
- Harry Styles, musician and actor
- John Taylor, musician
- David Thewlis, actor
- Louis Tomlinson, singer
- Peter Tork, singer
- Dean Torrence, singer
- Robert Townsend, actor and director
- Mayra Veronica, singer and author, Miss USO
- Antonio Villaraigosa, former California gubernatorial candidate and former mayor of Los Angeles
- Hana Vu, singer and songwriter
- Jack Webb, actor
- Jane Wiedlin, guitarist and member of the all female band The Go-Go's
- Forest Whitaker, actor, director and producer
- Charli XCX, singer

== Education ==
The neighborhood is zoned to LAUSD schools.

- Cheremoya Elementary School
- Le Conte Middle School
- Hollywood High School
