= Sia discography =

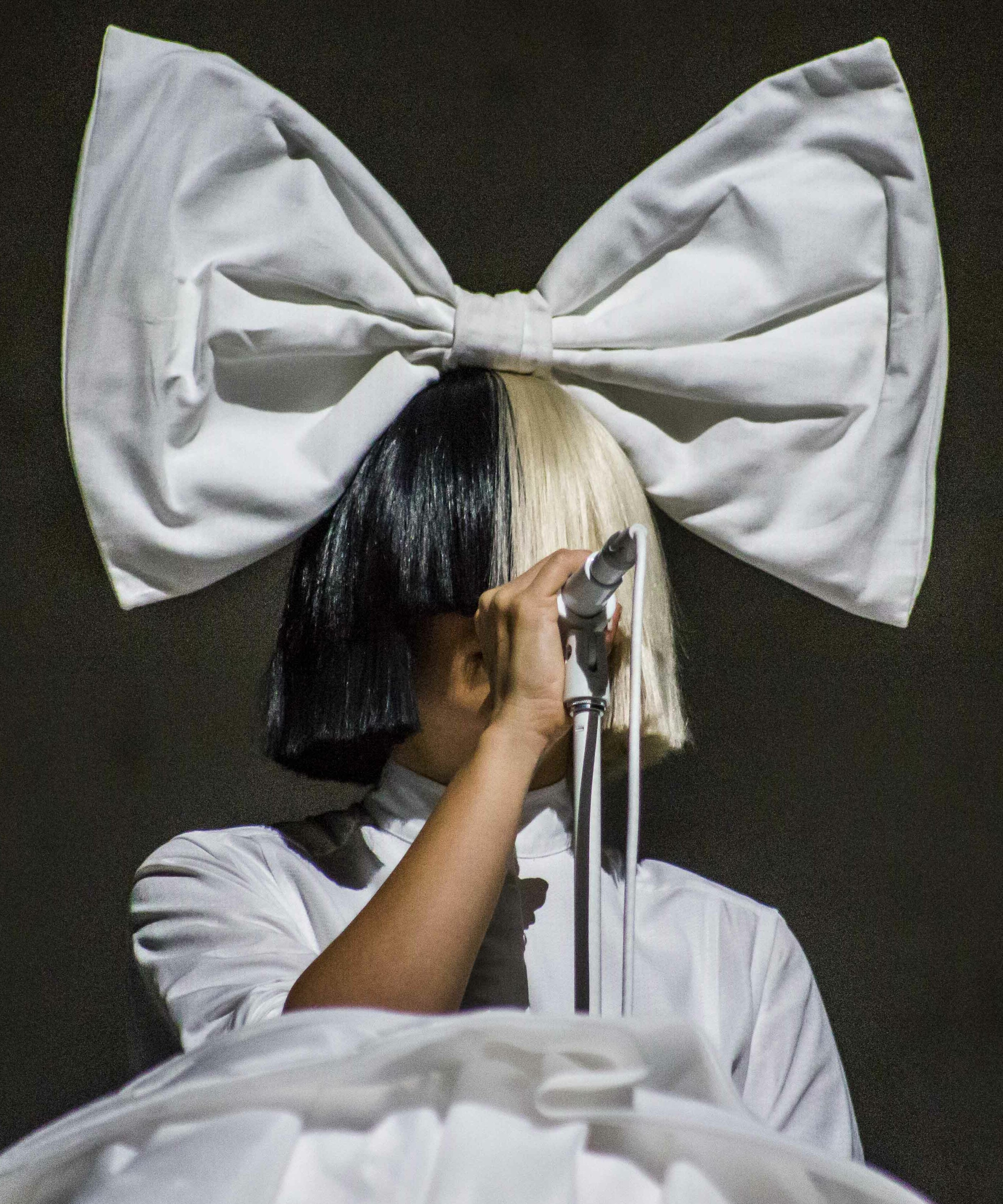
- Sia performing at Boston Calling 2016
- Studio albums: 10
- Live albums: 7
- Compilation albums: 1
- Singles: 69
- Video albums: 1
- Music videos: 45

Australian singer-songwriter Sia has released 10 studio albums, six live albums, 68 singles (including 22 as a featured artist), and 45 music videos. In 1997, she released her debut studio album entitled OnlySee. It was commercially unsuccessful, and none of its songs were released as a single. Sia released her second album, Healing Is Difficult, in 2001. The album yielded three singles: "Taken for Granted", "Little Man" and "Drink to Get Drunk". The lead single, "Taken for Granted", peaked at number 10 on the UK Singles Chart.

In 2004, Sia released her third studio album, Colour the Small One. Its singles were "Don't Bring Me Down", "Breathe Me", "Where I Belong" and "Numb". "Breathe Me" was the most successful single from Colour the Small One, peaking at number 19 in Denmark, number 71 in the United Kingdom and number 81 in France. In 2008, Sia released her fourth studio album, Some People Have Real Problems. The album was certified gold by the Australian Recording Industry Association (ARIA), and spawned five singles: "Day Too Soon", "The Girl You Lost to Cocaine", "Soon We'll Be Found", "Buttons" and "Academia". The follow-up album We Are Born was made available in 2010, certified gold by the ARIA. It generated three singles: "You've Changed", "Clap Your Hands" and "Bring Night".

In 2011, Sia was featured on the top-ten singles "Titanium" by David Guetta and "Wild Ones" by Flo Rida. In 2013, Sia contributed the song "Elastic Heart" to the soundtrack to the 2013 American film The Hunger Games: Catching Fire. A year later, she released her sixth studio album, 1000 Forms of Fear. It became Sia's most successful release, peaking atop the record charts of Australia, Canada and the United States. It was soon certified platinum in Australia and France. As of January 2016, the album had sold 1 million copies worldwide. Its lead single, "Chandelier", became Sia's first hit single as lead artist, peaking within the top ten of charts in various countries. 1000 Forms of Fear was further promoted by the singles "Big Girls Cry", Sia's solo version of "Elastic Heart" and "Fire Meet Gasoline".

Sia's seventh album, This Is Acting, was released in 2016. It became her second consecutive chart-topping album in Australia and peaked within the top ten in various countries, including Canada, the United Kingdom and the United States. Its two top ten singles in her native country were "Alive" and "Cheap Thrills" (solo or featuring singer/rapper Sean Paul). The latter became her most successful song as a lead artist, reaching the top five in many European countries and peaking at number one on the US Billboard Hot 100, where it became Sia's first song to do so. In 2017, Sia signed with Atlantic Records and released Everyday Is Christmas, her first Christmas album which featured 10 original songs, co-written and produced by Greg Kurstin. "Santa's Coming for Us" served as the only single from the album. The album was reissued in 2018 with three new songs, one of which was a cover of Perry Como's "Round and Round". In 2018, Sia formed group LSD alongside British singer-songwriter Labrinth and American producer Diplo. They released their self-titled album through Columbia Records in April 2019, which featured the singles "Genius", "Audio" and "Thunderclouds". Sia's ninth studio album, Music – Songs from and Inspired by the Motion Picture, was released in February 2021, in connection with the release of her directorial debut film Music. The album's lead single, "Together", was released in May 2020. Her tenth studio album Reasonable Woman was released on 3 May 2024, supported by several singles such as "Gimme Love", "Dance Alone" (with Kylie Minogue), "Incredible" (featuring Labrinth), "Fame Won't Love You" (with Paris Hilton), "Immortal Queen" (with Chaka Khan) and "I Forgive You".

For her work as a songwriter, she had sold 25 million songs worldwide as of October 2014. Sia had earned over 50 billion streams across her career, globally, as of November 2020.

== Albums ==
=== Studio albums ===
Title	Album details	Peak chart positions										Sales	Certifications
Title	Album details	AUS	CAN	DEN	FRA	GER	ITA	NZ	SWE	UK	US	Sales	Certifications
OnlySee	Released: 23 December 1997; Label: Flavoured Records; Formats: CD	—	—	—	—	—	—	—	—	—	—	AUS: 1,200	
Healing Is Difficult	Released: 9 July 2001; Label: Long Lost Brother; Formats: CD, digital download	99	—	—	—	—	—	—	—	—	—		
Colour the Small One	Released: January 2004; Label: Astralwerks, Go! Beat; Formats: CD, digital download	113	—	—	—	—	—	—	—	180	—	US: 98,000	
Some People Have Real Problems	Released: 8 January 2008; Label: Monkey Puzzle, Hear Music; Formats: CD, digital download	41	—	—	58	—	—	—	—	106	26	US: 51,000	ARIA: Gold
We Are Born	Released: 18 June 2010; Label: Monkey Puzzle, Jive; Formats: LP, CD, digital download	2	60	14	42	73	—	—	—	74	37		ARIA: Gold
1000 Forms of Fear	Released: 4 July 2014; Label: Monkey Puzzle, RCA; Formats: LP, CD, digital download	1	1	5	8	30	33	4	4	5	1	UK: 300,000; US: 374,000	ARIA: Platinum; BPI: Platinum; BVMI: Gold; FIMI: Platinum; IFPI DEN: 2× Platinum; IFPI SWE: Platinum; MC: 3× Platinum; RIAA: 2× Platinum; RMNZ: 2× Platinum; SNEP: Platinum
This Is Acting	Released: 29 January 2016; Label: Monkey Puzzle, RCA; Formats: LP, CD, digital download	1	2	11	3	14	13	5	10	3	4		ARIA: Gold; BPI: Platinum; BVMI: Platinum; FIMI: 2× Platinum; IFPI DEN: 3× Platinum; MC: 2× Platinum; RIAA: 2× Platinum; RMNZ: 3× Platinum; SNEP: Platinum
Everyday Is Christmas	Released: 17 November 2017; Label: Monkey Puzzle, Atlantic; Formats: LP, CD, digital download	7	8	4	41	4	23	16	5	39	27	US: 15,000	BPI: Silver; FIMI: Gold; IFPI DEN: Platinum; MC: Gold; RMNZ: Gold; SNEP: Gold
Music – Songs from and Inspired by the Motion Picture	Released: 12 February 2021; Label: Monkey Puzzle, Atlantic; Formats: LP, CD, cassette, digital download	12	88	—	29	28	—	—	—	90	— (Note: Music did not enter the Billboard 200 chart, but peaked at number 8 on the Billboard Soundtracks chart.)		SNEP: Gold
Reasonable Woman	Released: 3 May 2024; Label: Monkey Puzzle, Atlantic; Formats: LP, CD, digital download	14	88	—	—	16	80	35	—	59	153		
"—" denotes a recording that did not chart or was not released in that territory.

=== Compilation albums ===
Title	Album details	Peak chart positions
Title	Album details	AUS
Best Of...	Released: 30 March 2012; Label: Inertia; Formats: CD, digital download	27

=== Live albums ===
Title	Album details
Lady Croissant	Released: 3 April 2007; Label: Astralwerks; Format: CD, digital download
iTunes Live from Sydney	Released: 4 May 2009; Label: Monkey Puzzle; Format: Digital download
iTunes Live – ARIA Concert Series	Released: 11 May 2010; Label: Monkey Puzzle; Format: Digital download
The We Meaning You Tour (Copenhagen 12 May 2010)	Released: 19 July 2011; Label: Monkey Puzzle; Format: CD
The We Meaning You Tour, Live at the Roundhouse 27 May 2010	Released: 19 July 2011; Label: Monkey Puzzle; Format: CD
Spotify Sessions	Released: 13 April 2016; Label: Monkey Puzzle; Format: LP, streaming
Triple j Live at the Wireless – Big Day Out 2011	Released: 15 May 2020; Label: Australian Broadcasting Corporation; Format: Streaming

=== Remix albums ===
Title	Album details
The Girl You Lost to Cocaine (Remixes)	Released: 6 May 2008; Label: Ultra; Format: Digital download
Remixes 1 – EP	Released: 15 July 2008; Label: Go! Beat; Format: Digital download
Remixes 2 – EP	Released: 15 July 2008; Label: Go! Beat; Format: Digital download
Reasonable Remixes 1	Released: 25 October 2024; Label: Monkey Puzzle; Format: Digital download
Reasonable Remixes 2	Released: 15 November 2024; Label: Monkey Puzzle; Format: Digital download

=== Video albums ===
Title	Album details
TV Is My Parent	Released: 19 May 2009; Label: Hear Music; Format: DVD

== Singles ==
=== As lead artist ===
List of singles, with selected chart positions
Title	Year	Peak chart positions										Certifications	Album
Title	Year	AUS	CAN	DEN	FRA	GER	ITA	NZ	SWE	UK	US	Certifications	Album
"Taken for Granted"	2000	100	—	—	—	—	—	—	—	10	—		Healing Is Difficult
"Little Man"	2000	—	—	—	—	—	—	—	—	82	—		Healing Is Difficult
"Drink to Get Drunk" (with Different Gear)	2001	110	—	—	—	—	43	—	—	91	—		Healing Is Difficult
"Don't Bring Me Down"	2003	—	—	—	—	—	—	—	—	—	—		Colour the Small One
"Breathe Me"	2004	—	—	19	81	—	—	—	—	71	— (Note: "Breathe Me" did not enter the US Billboard Hot 100, but peaked at number 24 on the US Rock Digital Songs Chart.)	BPI: Platinum; IFPI DEN: Platinum; RMNZ: Platinum	Colour the Small One
"Where I Belong"	2004	—	—	—	—	—	—	—	—	85	—		Colour the Small One
"Numb"	2005	—	—	—	—	—	—	—	—	—	—		Colour the Small One
"Day Too Soon"	2007	—	—	—	—	—	—	—	—	—	—		Some People Have Real Problems
"The Girl You Lost to Cocaine"	2008	—	—	—	—	—	—	—	—	—	— (Note: "The Girl You Lost to Cocaine" did not enter the US Billboard Hot 100, but peaked at number 8 on the US Dance Club Songs Chart.)		Some People Have Real Problems
"Soon We'll Be Found"	2008	89	—	—	—	—	—	—	—	94	—		Some People Have Real Problems
"Buttons"	2008	67	—	—	—	—	—	—	—	—	—		Some People Have Real Problems
"Academia"	2009	—	—	—	—	—	—	—	—	—	—		Some People Have Real Problems
"You've Changed"	2009	31	—	—	—	—	—	—	—	—	—		We Are Born
"Under the Milky Way"	2010	—	—	—	—	—	—	—	—	—	—		Non-album single
"Clap Your Hands"	2010	17	—	—	—	—	—	—	—	—	— (Note: "Clap Your Hands" did not enter the US Billboard Hot 100, but peaked at number 28 on the US Hot Dance Club Songs Chart.)		We Are Born
"Bring Night"	2010	99	—	—	—	—	—	—	—	—	—		We Are Born
"Elastic Heart" (featuring the Weeknd and Diplo)	2013	67	—	21	—	—	—	7	— (Note: "Elastic Heart" did not enter the Swedish Singles Chart, but peaked at number 14 on the Swedish Heatseeker chart.)	61	—	IFPI DEN: 2× Platinum; RMNZ: 4× Platinum	The Hunger Games: Catching Fire
"Chandelier"	2014	2	6	6	1	10	2	3	4	6	8	ARIA: 5× Platinum; BPI: 5× Platinum; BVMI: 3× Gold; FIMI: 5× Platinum; IFPI DEN: 3× Platinum; IFPI SWE: 4× Platinum; MC: Diamond; RIAA: Diamond; RMNZ: 6× Platinum; SNEP: Diamond	1000 Forms of Fear
"Big Girls Cry"	2014	16	64	—	18	—	—	—	— (Note: "Big Girls Cry" did not enter the Swedish Singles Chart, but peaked at number 15 on the Swedish Heatseeker chart.)	77	— (Note: "Big Girls Cry" did not enter the US Billboard Hot 100, but peaked at number 3 on the Bubbling Under Hot 100 Singles chart, which serves as an extension of the Billboard Hot 100.)	ARIA: Platinum; BPI: Silver; IFPI DEN: Gold; MC: Gold; RIAA: Gold; RMNZ: Gold	1000 Forms of Fear
"You're Never Fully Dressed Without a Smile"	2014	71	—	—	—	85	—	—	—	125	—		Annie
"Elastic Heart"	2015	5	7	21	23	29	11	7	14	10	17	ARIA: 3× Platinum; BPI: 3× Platinum; BVMI: Platinum; FIMI: 2× Platinum; MC: 7× Platinum; RIAA: 5× Platinum; SNEP: Gold	1000 Forms of Fear
"Fire Meet Gasoline"	2015	60	—	—	39	85	—	—	—	193	—	MC: Gold	1000 Forms of Fear
"Alive"	2015	10	28	—	17	—	57	29	69	30	56	ARIA: Platinum; BPI: Platinum; FIMI: Platinum; IFPI DEN: Gold; IFPI SWE: Gold; MC: Platinum; RIAA: Platinum; RMNZ: Platinum	This Is Acting
"Cheap Thrills" (solo or featuring Sean Paul)	2016	6	1	2	1	1	1	3	1	2	1	ARIA: 4× Platinum; BPI: 6× Platinum; BVMI: Diamond; FIMI: Diamond; IFPI DEN: 4× Platinum; IFPI SWE: 4× Platinum; MC: Diamond; RIAA: 11× Platinum; RMNZ: 7× Platinum	This Is Acting
"The Greatest" (Note: "The Greatest" was originally released on the deluxe version of This Is Acting. It was released as the third single from the album on 5 September 2016.) (featuring Kendrick Lamar)	2016	2	6	5	3	3	5	5	5	5	18	ARIA: 2× Platinum; BPI: 2× Platinum; BVMI: 3× Gold; FIMI: 4× Platinum; IFPI DEN: 2× Platinum; MC: 4× Platinum; RIAA: 4× Platinum; RMNZ: 3× Platinum; SNEP: Diamond	This Is Acting
"Never Give Up"	2016	29	—	—	17	8	—	—	—	—	—	ARIA: Gold; BVMI: Platinum; RMNZ: Gold; SNEP: Platinum	Lion
"Angel by the Wings"	2016	— (Note: "Angel by the Wings" did not enter the main Australian Singles Chart, but peaked at number 29 on the Australian Digital Tracks (ARIA))	—	—	—	—	—	— (Note: "Angel by the Wings" did not enter the NZ Top 40 Singles Chart, but peaked at number six on the NZ Heatseekers Singles Chart.)	—	—	—		The Eagle Huntress
"Move Your Body" (Single mix)	2017	34	82	—	62	—	90	— (Note: "Move Your Body" did not enter the NZ Top 40 Singles Chart, but peaked at number two on the NZ Heatseekers Singles Chart.)	57	59	— (Note: "Move Your Body" did not enter the US Billboard Hot 100, but peaked at number 24 on the US Dance Mix Show Airplay Chart.)	BPI: Gold; BVMI: Gold; FIMI: Gold; IFPI DEN: Gold; IFPI SWE: Gold; RIAA: Gold; RMNZ: Platinum; SNEP: Gold	This Is Acting
"To Be Human" (featuring Labrinth)	2017	—	—	—	117	—	—	—	—	—	— (Note: "To Be Human" did not enter the US Billboard Hot 100, but peakes at number 12 on the US Anglo (Monitor Latino) Chart.)		Wonder Woman
"Reaper"	2017	89	78	—	89	—	—	—	—	—	—		This Is Acting
"Free Me"	2017	—	—	—	155	—	—	— (Note: "Free Me" did not enter the NZ Top 40 Singles Chart, but peaked at number seven on the NZ Heatseekers Singles Chart.)	—	—	—		Non-album single
"Rainbow"	2017	—	—	—	—	—	—	—	—	—	—		My Little Pony: The Movie
"Santa's Coming for Us"	2017	51	67	—	45	50	82	— (Note: "Santa's Coming for Us" did not enter the NZ Top 40 Singles Chart, but peaked at number four on the NZ Heatseeker Singles Chart.)	46	17	— (Note: "Santa's Coming for Us" did not enter the US Billboard Hot 100, but peaked at number 11 on the Bubbling Under Hot 100 Singles chart, which serves as an extension of the Billboard Hot 100.)	BPI: Platinum; IFPI DEN: Platinum; RIAA: Gold; RMNZ: Gold; SNEP: Gold	Everyday Is Christmas
"Snowman"	2017	11	13	17	5	6	14	11	5	18	41	BPI: 2× Platinum; BVMI: Platinum; FIMI: Platinum; IFPI DEN: 2× Platinum; RIAA: 2× Platinum; RMNZ: 2× Platinum; SNEP: Diamond	Everyday Is Christmas
"Helium" (vs David Guetta and Afrojack)	2018	88	— (Note: "Helium" did not enter the Canadian Hot 100 but peaked at number 9 on the Hot Canadian Digital Song Sales chart.)	—	—	—	—	— (Note: "Helium" did not enter the NZ Top 40 Singles Chart, but peaked at number six on the NZ Heatseeker Singles Chart.)	61	—	— (Note: "Helium" did not enter the Billboard Hot 100 but peaked at number 17 on the US Digital Song Sales chart.)		Fifty Shades Darker
"Flames" (with David Guetta)	2018	19	66	40	2	7	11	— (Note: "Flames" did not enter the NZ Top 40 Singles Chart, but peaked at number three on the NZ Heatseeker Singles Chart.)	9	7	— (Note: "Flames" did not enter the Billboard Hot 100 but peaked at number 47 on the US Digital Song Sales chart.)	ARIA: 2× Platinum; BPI: 2× Platinum; BVMI: Platinum; FIMI: 2× Platinum; IFPI DEN: Platinum; MC: Platinum; RMNZ: Platinum; SNEP: Diamond	7
"Here I Am" (with Dolly Parton)	2018	—	—	—	—	—	—	—	—	—	— (Note: "Here I Am" did not enter the Billboard Hot 100 but peaked at number 27 on the US Digital Song Sales chart.)		Dumplin'
"I'm Still Here"	2018	—	—	—	—	—	—	— (Note: "I'm Still Here" did not enter the NZ Top 40 Singles Chart, but peaked at number 25 on the NZ Hot Singles Chart.)	—	—	— (Note: "I'm Still Here" did not enter the Billboard Hot 100 but peaked at number 41 on the US Digital Song Sales chart.)		Non-album single
"Original"	2020	—	—	—	—	—	—	— (Note: "Original" did not enter the NZ Top 40 Singles Chart, but peaked at number 22 on the NZ Hot Singles Chart.)	—	—	—		Dolittle
"Saved My Life"	2020	—	—	—	—	—	—	— (Note: "Save My Life" did not enter the NZ Top 40 Singles Chart, but peaked at number 14 on the NZ Hot Singles Chart.)	— (Note: "Saved My Life" did not enter the Swedish Singles Chart, but peaked at number nine on the Swedish Heatseeker Chart.)	—	—		Music
"Together"	2020	27	70	—	161	—	—	— (Note: "Together" did not enter the NZ Top 40 Singles Chart, but peaked at number 10 on the NZ Hot Singles Chart.)	— (Note: While "Together" did not enter the Swedish Singles Chart, it peaked at number 12 on the Swedish Heatseeker Chart.)	96	—	MC: Gold; RMNZ: Gold	Music
"Let's Love" (with David Guetta)	2020	94	—	—	47	30	45	— (Note: "Let's Love" did not enter the NZ Top 40 Singles Chart, but peaked at number 10 on the NZ Hot Singles Chart.)	—	53	—	FIMI: Platinum	Non-album single
"Courage to Change"	2020	180	—	—	48	—	—	— (Note: "Courage to Change" did not enter the NZ Top 40 Singles Chart, but peaked at number 17 on the NZ Hot Singles Chart.)	— (Note: "Courage to Change" did not enter the Swedish Singles Chart, it peaked at number 19 on the Swedish Heatseeker Chart.)	—	—	SNEP: Platinum	Music
"Del Mar" (with Ozuna and Doja Cat)	2020	—	—	—	30	—	—	— (Note: "Del Mar" did not enter the NZ Top 40 Singles Chart, but peaked at number 36 on the NZ Hot Singles chart.)	—	—	— (Note: "Del Mar" did not enter the Billboard Hot 100, but peaked at number 20 on the Bubbling Under Hot 100 chart.)	FIMI: Platinum; SNEP: Diamond	ENOC
"Hey Boy" (solo or featuring Burna Boy)	2020	—	—	—	—	—	—	— (Note: "Hey Boy" did not enter the NZ Top 40 Singles Chart, but peaked at number 27 on the NZ Hot Singles Chart.)	—	—	—		Music
"Floating Through Space" (with David Guetta)	2021	—	—	—	50	56	—	— (Note: "Floating Through Space" did not enter the NZ Top 40 Singles Chart, but peaked at number 21 on the NZ Hot Singles Chart.)	55	—	—	SNEP: Platinum	Music
"1+1" (solo or featuring Amir)	2021	—	—	—	40	—	—	— (Note: "1+1" did not enter the NZ Top 40 Singles Chart, but peaked at number 30 on the NZ Hot Singles Chart.)	—	—	—	SNEP: Platinum	Music
"Unstoppable"	2022	115	31	—	23	62	—	—	94	—	28	BPI: 2× Platinum; BVMI: 3× Gold; FIMI: 2× Platinum; IFPI DEN: 2× Platinum; RIAA: 4× Platinum; RMNZ: 4× Platinum; SNEP: Diamond	This Is Acting
"Gimme Love"	2023	—	—	—	15	69	—	—	88	—	— (Note: "Gimme Love" did not enter the Billboard Hot 100 Singles chart, but peaked at number 12 on the Billboard Adult Pop Airplay Top 40 Chart.)	SNEP: Diamond	Reasonable Woman
"Hass Hass" (with Diljit Dosanjh)	2023	—	54	—	—	—	—	—	—	—	—		Non-album single
"Dance Alone" (with Kylie Minogue)	2024	— (Note: "Dance Alone" did not enter the ARIA Top 50 Singles chart, but peaked at number 1 on the Australian Independent Singles Chart.)	—	—	—	—	—	— (Note: "Dance Alone" did not enter the NZ Top 40 Singles Chart, but peaked at number 19 on the NZ Hot Singles Chart.)	—	60	—		Reasonable Woman
"Incredible" (featuring Labrinth)	2024	—	—	—	—	—	—	— (Note: "Incredible" did not enter the NZ Top 40 Singles Chart, but peaked at number 35 on the NZ Hot Singles Chart.)	—	—	—		Reasonable Woman
"Fame Won't Love You" (featuring Paris Hilton)	2024	—	—	—	—	—	—	— (Note: "Fame Won't Love You" did not enter the NZ Top 40 Singles Chart, but peaked at number 34 on the NZ Hot Singles Chart.)	—	—	—		Reasonable Woman
"Immortal Queen" (featuring Chaka Khan and Bianca Costa)	2024	—	—	—	—	—	—	— (Note: "Immortal Queen" did not enter the NZ Top 40 Singles Chart, but peaked at number 22 on the NZ Hot Singles Chart.)	—	—	—		Reasonable Woman
"I Forgive You"	2024	—	—	—	—	—	—	— (Note: "I Forgive You" did not enter the NZ Top 40 Singles Chart, but peaked at number 31 on the NZ Hot Singles Chart.)	—	—	—		Reasonable Woman
"Solsbury Hill"	2025	—	—	—	—	—	—	—	—	—	—		Non-album singles
"Beautiful People" (with David Guetta)	2025	— (Note: "Beautiful People" did not enter the Australian top 100 Singles Chart, but peaked at number 19 on Australian Artist Chart.)	—	—	42	34	—	— (Note: "Beautiful People" did not enter the NZ Top 40 Singles Chart, but peaked at number 14 on the NZ Hot Singles Chart.)	— (Note: "Beautiful People" did not enter the Swedish Singles Chart, but peaked at number six on the Swedish Heatseeker chart.)	55	—	BPI: Silver; SNEP: Platinum	Non-album singles
"Street X Street" (with Cypress Hill and DJ Flict)	2025	—	—	—	—	—	—	—	—	—	—		Non-album singles
"Ranjha" (with Diljit Dosanjh and David Guetta)	2026	—	—	—	—	—	—	— (Note: "Ranjha" did not enter the NZ Top 40 Singles Chart, but peaked at number 24 on the NZ Hot Singles Chart.)	—	—	—		Non-album singles
"Awake Tonight" (with Afrojack and David Guetta)	2026	—	—	—	—	—	—	— (Note: "Never Adds Up" did not enter the NZ Top 40 Singles Chart, but peaked at number 38 on the NZ Hot Singles Chart.)	—	—	—		Non-album singles
"—" denotes releases that did not chart or were not released in that country.

=== As featured artist ===
List of singles, with selected chart positions
Title	Year	Peak chart positions										Certifications	Album
Title	Year	AUS	CAN	DEN	FRA	GER	ITA	NZ	SWE	UK	US	Certifications	Album
"Destiny" (Zero 7 featuring Sia and Sophie Barker)	2001	—	—	—	—	—	—	—	—	30	—		Simple Things
"Distractions" (Zero 7 featuring Sia)	2002	—	—	—	—	—	—	—	—	45	—		Simple Things
"Somersault" (Zero 7 featuring Sia)	2004	—	—	—	—	—	—	—	—	56	—		When It Falls
"I'll Forget You" (Lior featuring Sia)	2008	—	—	—	—	—	—	—	—	—	—		Corner of an Endless Road
"You've Changed" (Lauren Flax featuring Sia)	2009	—	—	—	—	—	—	—	—	—	—		Non-album single
"I Love It" (Hilltop Hoods featuring Sia)	2011	6	—	—	—	—	—	13	—	—	—	ARIA: 8× Platinum; RMNZ: Platinum	Drinking from the Sun
"Titanium" (David Guetta featuring Sia)	2011	5	7	3	3	5	3	3	3	1	7	ARIA: 5× Platinum; BPI: 6× Platinum; BVMI: 2× Platinum; FIMI: 4× Platinum; IFPI DEN: 3× Platinum; RIAA: 5× Platinum; RMNZ: 8× Platinum; SNEP: Gold	Nothing but the Beat
"Wild Ones" (Flo Rida featuring Sia)	2011	1	1	11	11	6	15	1	3	4	5	ARIA: 7× Platinum; BPI: 3× Platinum; BVMI: Platinum; FIMI: Gold; IFPI DEN: 3× Platinum; IFPI SWE: 5× Platinum; MC: 5× Platinum; RIAA: 5× Platinum; RMNZ: 6× Platinum	Wild Ones
"Wild One Two" (Jack Back featuring David Guetta, Nicky Romero and Sia)	2012	52	—	—	—	65	—	—	—	171	—		Nothing but the Beat 2.0
"She Wolf (Falling to Pieces)" (David Guetta featuring Sia)	2012	11	35	7	4	3	6	19	4	8	—	ARIA: 2× Platinum; BPI: Platinum; BVMI: Gold; FIMI: 2× Platinum; IFPI DEN: 2× Platinum; RMNZ: Gold; SNEP: Gold	Nothing but the Beat 2.0
"Dim the Light" (Creep featuring Sia)	2013	—	—	—	—	—	—	—	—	—	—		Echoes
"Battle Cry" (Angel Haze featuring Sia)	2014	—	—	—	—	—	—	—	—	70	—		Dirty Gold
"Guts Over Fear" (Eminem featuring Sia)	2014	22	9	22	10	35	45	22	40	10	22	ARIA: Platinum; BPI: Silver; RIAA: Platinum; RMNZ: Gold	Shady XV
"Déjà Vu" (Giorgio Moroder featuring Sia)	2015	—	—	—	182	—	—	—	—	194	—		Déjà Vu
"Golden" (Travie McCoy featuring Sia)	2015	4	— (Note: "Golden" did not enter the US Hot 100 but peaked at number 24 on the Pop Digital Song Sales chart.)	—	—	—	—	20	—	—	—	ARIA: Platinum; RMNZ: Gold	Rough Water
"Bang My Head" (David Guetta featuring Sia and Fetty Wap)	2015	21	51	38	3	24	22	17	19	18	76	BPI: Platinum; BVMI: Gold; FIMI: 2× Platinum; IFPI DEN: Gold; IFPI SWE: Platinum; RIAA: Gold; RMNZ: Platinum; SNEP: Diamond	Listen Again
"Je te pardonne" (Maître Gims featuring Sia)	2016	—	—	—	12	—	—	—	—	—	—		Mon cœur avait raison
"Living Out Loud" (Brooke Candy featuring Sia)	2017	—	—	—	—	—	—	—	—	—	—		Non-album singles
"Waterfall" (Stargate featuring Pink and Sia)	2017	19	86	—	36	47	79	—	67	47	—	ARIA: Gold	Non-album singles
"Dusk Till Dawn" (Zayn featuring Sia)	2017	6	5	12	8	3	6	8	2	5	44	ARIA: 4× Platinum; BPI: 3× Platinum; BVMI: Platinum; FIMI: 3× Platinum; IFPI DEN: 2× Platinum; IFPI SWE: 5× Platinum; MC: 4× Platinum; RIAA: 2× Platinum; RMNZ: 5× Platinum; SNEP: Diamond	Icarus Falls
"That's Life" (88-Keys featuring Mac Miller and Sia)	2019	—	—	—	—	—	—	—	—	—	—	RIAA: Gold	Non-album single
"On" (BTS featuring Sia)	2020	—	—	—	—	36	—	—	—	—	—		Map of the Soul: 7
"Exhale" (Kenzie featuring Sia)	2020	—	—	—	—	—	—	—	—	—	—		Non-album singles
"Cold" (Leslie Odom Jr. featuring Sia)	2020	—	—	—	—	—	—	—	—	—	—		Non-album singles
"Titans" (Major Lazer featuring Sia and Labrinth)	2021	—	—	—	—	—	—	— (Note: "Titans" did not enter the NZ Top 40 Singles Chart, but peaked at number 17 on the NZ Hot Singles Chart.)	— (Note: "Titans" did not enter the Swedish Singellista Chart, but peaked at number two on the Swedish Heatseeker Chart.)	—	—	SNEP: Gold	Music Is the Weapon (Reloaded)
"Diamond Eyes" (Eddie Benjamin featuring Sia)	2021	—	—	—	—	—	—	—	—	—	—		Emotional
"Born Yesterday" (Arca featuring Sia)	2021	—	—	—	—	—	—	—	—	—	—		Kick II
"Dynamite" (Sean Paul featuring Sia)	2021	—	—	—	108	—	—	— (Note: "Dynamite" did not enter the NZ Top 40 Singles Chart, but peaked at number 31 on the NZ Hot Singles Chart.)	—	—	—	SNEP: Gold	Scorcha
"Perfect" (Remix) (Sam i, Tropkillaz and Sia featuring BIA and MC Pikachu)	2025	—	—	—	—	—	—	—	—	—	—		Non-album single
"Disguise" (Tobe Nwigwe featuring Sia and Fat Nwigwe)	2026	—	—	—	—	—	—	—	—	—	—		The Bridge
"—" denotes releases that did not chart or were not released in that country.

=== Promotional singles ===
Title	Year	Peak chart positions							Certifications	Album
Title	Year	AUS	CAN	FRA	NZ	SWE	UK	US	Certifications	Album
"Eye of the Needle"	2014	36	—	71	—	—	181	—		1000 Forms of Fear
"Salted Wound"	2015	133	—	70	—	— (Note: "Salted Wound" did not enter the Swedish Singles Chart, but peaked at number four on the Swedish Heatseeker chart.)	118	—		Fifty Shades of Grey
"Bird Set Free"	2015	36	98	49	—	— (Note: "Bird Set Free" did not enter the Swedish Singles Chart, but peaked at number 13 on the Swedish Heatseeker chart.)	92	— (Note: "Bird Set Free" did not enter the US Hot 100 but peaked at number 34 on the Pop Digital Song Sales chart.)	BPI: Silver; FIMI: Gold; RIAA: Platinum; RMNZ: Gold	This Is Acting
"One Million Bullets"	2016	190	—	—	—	—	—	—		This Is Acting
"Unforgettable"	2016	—	—	—	—	—	—	—		Finding Dory
"Satisfied" (featuring Miguel and Queen Latifah)	2016	—	—	—	—	—	—	— (Note: "Satisfied" did not enter the US Billboard Hot 100, but peaked at number 14 on the Bubbling Under Hot 100 Singles chart, which serves as an extension of the Billboard Hot 100.)		The Hamilton Mixtape
"Fly Me to the Moon"	2021	—	—	—	—	—	—	—		Non-album single
"Manchild"	2022	—	—	—	—	—	—	—		The Versions
"—" denotes releases that did not chart or were not released in that country.

== Other charted songs ==
Song	Year	Peak chart positions								Certifications	Album
Song	Year	AUS	CAN	FRA	GER	NZ	SWE	UK	US	Certifications	Album
"I Go to Sleep"	2010	32	—	—	—	—	—	—	—		Some People Have Real Problems
"Beautiful Pain" (Eminem featuring Sia)	2013	59	55	114	87	15	—	67	99	ARIA: Gold; BPI: Silver; RIAA: Gold; RMNZ: Platinum	The Marshall Mathers LP 2
"Burn the Pages"	2014	82	—	—	—	—	—	—	—		1000 Forms of Fear
"The Whisperer" (David Guetta featuring Sia)	2014	—	—	96	—	—	—	—	—		Listen
"My Love"	2015	76	—	—	—	—	—	—	—		The Twilight Saga: Eclipse
"Broken Glass"	2016	—	—	—	—	—	— (Note: "Broken Glass" did not enter the Swedish Singles Chart, but peaked at number 10 on the Swedish Heatseeker chart.)	—	—		This Is Acting
"Waving Goodbye"	2016	—	—	95	—	—	—	—	—		The Neon Demon
"Move Your Body" (Alan Walker remix)	2016	—	—	—	—	—	57	—	— (Note: "Move Your Body" did not enter the US Hot 100 but peaked at number 33 on the Pop Digital Song Sales chart.)	IFPI SWE: Gold	This Is Acting (Deluxe edition)
"Confetti"	2016	—	— (Note: "Confetti" did not enter the Canadian Hot 100 but peaked at number 23 on the Hot Canadian Digital Song Sales chart.)	71	—	—	—	—	—		This Is Acting (Deluxe edition)
"Midnight Decisions"	2016	—	—	146	—	—	—	—	—		This Is Acting (Deluxe edition)
"Helium"	2017	— (Note: "Helium" did not enter the ARIA Singles Chart, but peaked at number 17 on the ARIA Digital Tracks chart.)	74	10	30	— (Note: "Helium" did not enter the NZ Top 40 Singles Chart, but peaked at number 2 on the NZ Heatseekers Singles chart.)	32	45	71	BPI: Gold; FIMI: Gold; IFPI DEN: Gold; RMNZ: Gold	Fifty Shades Darker
"Candy Cane Lane"	2017	—	—	—	—	—	—	—	—	RIAA: Gold	Everyday Is Christmas
"—" denotes releases that did not chart or were not released in that country.

== Songwriting and other appearances ==
#	Song	Year	Artist	Album	Contribution
1	"Some Kind of Love Song"	1999	Friendly	Akimbo	Vocalist (uncredited)
2	"Distractions" "Destiny"	2001	Zero 7	Simple Things	Co-writer Vocalist
3	"Speed Dial No. 2"	2004	Zero 7	When It Falls	Co-writer Vocalist
4	"Utopía"	2006	Belinda	Utopía	Co-writer Vocalist
5	"I Go to Sleep"	2007	Sia	Sounds Eclectic: The Covers Project	Vocalist
6	"You Don't Know"	2008	Will Young	Let It Go	Co-writer
7	"Wicked Game"	2009	Peter Jöback	East Side Stories	Featured vocalist
8	"You Don't Have to Be a Prostitute"	2009	Flight of the Conchords	I Told You I Was Freaky	Background vocalist
9	"Carol Brown"	2009	Flight of the Conchords	I Told You I Was Freaky	Background vocalist
10	"Never So Big"	2010	David Byrne and Fatboy Slim	Here Lies Love	Co-writer and featured vocalist
11	"Sweet One"	2010	Katie Noonan and the Captains	Emperor's Box	Co-writer and featured vocalist
12	"You Lost Me"	2010	Christina Aguilera	Bionic	Co-writer and vocal producer
13	"All I Need"	2010	Christina Aguilera	Bionic	Co-writer and vocal producer
14	"I Am"	2010	Christina Aguilera	Bionic	Co-writer and vocal producer
15	"Stronger Than Ever"	2010	Christina Aguilera	Bionic	Co-writer and vocal producer
16	"Bound to You"	2010	Christina Aguilera	Burlesque: Original Motion Picture Soundtrack	Co-writer
17	"My Love"	2011	Sia	The Twilight Saga: Eclipse	Co-writer and vocalist
18	"Get Over U"	2011	Neon Hitch	Non-album single	Co-writer
19	"Dragging You Around"	2012	Greg Laswell	Landline	Co-writer and featured vocalist
20	"Blank Page"	2012	Christina Aguilera	Lotus	Co-writer
21	"Diamonds"	2012	Rihanna	Unapologetic	Co-writer
22	"Let Me Love You (Until You Learn to Love Yourself)"	2012	Ne-Yo	R.E.D.	Co-writer
23	"Radioactive"	2012	Rita Ora	ORA	Co-writer
24	"Kill, Fuck, Marry"	2012	Nikki Williams	—N/a	Co-writer
25	"Kill and Run"	2013	Sia	The Great Gatsby: Music from Baz Luhrmann's Film	Co-writer and vocalist
26	"Loved Me Back to Life"	2013	Celine Dion	Loved Me Back to Life	Co-writer
27	"Acid Rain"	2013	Alexis Jordan	—N/a	Co-writer
28	"Strange Birds"	2013	Birdy	Fire Within	Co-writer
29	"Green Card"	2013	Oh Land	Wish Bone	Co-writer
30	"The Hands I Hold"	2013	Bo Bruce	Before I Sleep	Co-writer
31	"Gentlemen"	2013	Jessica Sanchez	Me, You & the Music	Co-writer
32	"Double Rainbow"	2013	Katy Perry	Prism	Co-writer
33	"Breathe"	2013	Jessie J	Alive	Co-writer
34	"Unite"	2013	Jessie J	Alive	Co-writer
35	"Perfume"	2013	Britney Spears	Britney Jean	Co-writer and backing vocalist
36	"Passenger"	2013	Britney Spears	Britney Jean	Co-writer and backing vocalist
37	"Brightest Morning Star"	2013	Britney Spears	Britney Jean	Co-writer and backing vocalist
38	"Beautiful Pain"	2013	Eminem featuring Sia	The Marshall Mathers LP 2	Co-writer and featured vocalist
39	"Standing on the Sun"	2013	Beyoncé	H&M Spring Summer 2013	Co-writer and backing vocalist
40	"Pretty Hurts"	2013	Beyoncé	Beyoncé	Co-writer
41	"God Made You Beautiful"	2013	Beyoncé	Live in Atlantic City	Co-writer
42	"Rise Up"	2013	Beyoncé	Epic	Co-writer
43	"Dim the Lights"	2013	CREEP	Echoes	Co-writer and featured vocalist
44	"Cannonball"	2014	Lea Michele	Louder	Co-writer and backing vocalist
45	"Battlefield"	2014	Lea Michele	Louder	Co-writer and backing vocalist
46	"You're Mine"	2014	Lea Michele	Louder	Co-writer
47	"If You Say So"	2014	Lea Michele	Louder	Co-writer
48	"Into the Blue"	2014	Kylie Minogue	Kiss Me Once	Executive producer
49	"Million Miles"	2014	Kylie Minogue	Kiss Me Once	Executive producer
50	"I Was Gonna Cancel"	2014	Kylie Minogue	Kiss Me Once	Executive producer
51	"Sexy Love"	2014	Kylie Minogue	Kiss Me Once	Executive producer
52	"Feels So Good"	2014	Kylie Minogue	Kiss Me Once	Executive producer
53	"If Only"	2014	Kylie Minogue	Kiss Me Once	Executive producer
54	"Les Sex"	2014	Kylie Minogue	Kiss Me Once	Executive producer
55	"Beautiful"	2014	Kylie Minogue	Kiss Me Once	Executive producer
56	"Fine"	2014	Kylie Minogue	Kiss Me Once	Executive producer
57	"Sexercize"	2014	Kylie Minogue	Kiss Me Once	Co-writer and executive producer
58	"Kiss Me Once"	2014	Kylie Minogue	Kiss Me Once	Writer and executive producer
59	"Chasing Shadows"	2014	Shakira	Shakira	Co-writer and backing vocalist
60	"We Are One (Ole Ola)"	2014	Pitbull featuring Jennifer Lopez and Claudia Leitte	One Love, One Rhythm	Co-writer
61	"Expertease (Ready Set Go)"	2014	Jennifer Lopez	A.K.A.	Co-writer and backing vocalist
62	"Pop Rock"	2014	Brooke Candy	Opulence	Co-writer and backing vocalist
63	"Opulence"	2014	Brooke Candy	Opulence	Co-writer
64	"Godzillinaire"	2014	Brooke Candy	Opulence	Co-writer
65	"Guts Over Fear"	2014	Eminem featuring Sia	Shady XV	Co-writer and featured vocalist
66	"My Heart Is Open"	2014	Maroon 5 featuring Gwen Stefani	V	Co-writer
67	"Firecracker"	2014	Cheryl	Only Human	Co-writer and featured vocalist
68	"Push (Feeling Good on a Wednesday)"	2014	Randy Marsh as Lorde	—N/a	Vocalist
69	"Bang My Head"	2014	David Guetta featuring Sia	Listen	Co-writer and featured vocalist
70	"The Whisperer"	2014	David Guetta featuring Sia	Listen	Co-writer and featured vocalist
71	"Moonquake Lake"	2014	Sia featuring Beck	Annie	Co-writer and vocalist
72	"I Think I'm Gonna Like It Here (2014 Film Version)"	2014	Rose Byrne, Stephanie Kurtzuba, Quvenzhané Wallis	Annie	Co-writer
73	"Little Girls (2014 Film Version)"	2014	Cameron Diaz	Annie	Co-writer
74	"The City's Yours (for the 2014 film Annie)"	2014	Jamie Foxx, Quvenzhané Wallis	Annie	Co-writer
75	"Opportunity (for the 2014 film Annie)"	2014	Quvenzhané Wallis	Annie	Co-writer
76	"Easy Street (2014 Film Version)"	2014	Bobby Cannavale, Cameron Diaz	Annie	Co-writer
77	"Who Am I? (for the 2014 film Annie)"	2014	Cameron Diaz, Jamie Foxx, Quvenzhané Wallis	Annie	Co-writer
78	"I Don't Need Anything but You (2014 Film Version)"	2014	Rose Byrne, Jamie Foxx, Quvenzhané Wallis	Annie	Co-writer
79	"Salted Wound"	2015	Sia	Fifty Shades of Grey (Original Motion Picture Soundtrack)	Co-writer and vocalist
80	"Throw Down the Roses"	2015	Kate Pierson	Guitars and Microphones	Co-writer, executive producer, backing vocalist and percussionist
81	"Bring Your Arms"	2015	Kate Pierson	Guitars and Microphones	Co-writer, executive producer, and backing vocalist
82	"Matrix"	2015	Kate Pierson	Guitars and Microphones	Co-writer, executive producer, and backing vocalist
83	"Pulls You Under"	2015	Kate Pierson	Guitars and Microphones	Co-writer, executive producer, and backing vocalist
84	"Mister Sister"	2015	Kate Pierson	Guitars and Microphones	Co-writer and executive producer
85	"Guitars and Microphones"	2015	Kate Pierson	Guitars and Microphones	Co-writer and executive producer
86	"Crush Me With Your Love"	2015	Kate Pierson	Guitars and Microphones	Co-writer and executive producer
87	"Bottoms Up"	2015	Kate Pierson	Guitars and Microphones	Co-writer and executive producer
88	"Time Wave Zero"	2015	Kate Pierson	Guitars and Microphones	Co-writer and executive producer
89	"Wolves"	2015	Kate Pierson	Guitars and Microphones	Executive producer
90	"Invincible"	2015	Kelly Clarkson	Piece by Piece	Co-writer
91	"Let Your Tears Fall"	2015	Kelly Clarkson	Piece by Piece	Co-writer
92	"Wolves"	2015	Kanye West featuring Sia and Vic Mensa	The Life of Pablo	Featured vocalist
93	"Beautiful People"	2015	Wiz Khalifa featuring Sia	—N/a	Featured vocalist
94	"Freeze You Out"	2015	Marina Kaye	Fearless	Writer
95	"Flashlight"	2015	Jessie J	Pitch Perfect 2: Original Motion Picture Soundtrack	Co-writer
96	"California Dreamin'"	2015	Sia	San Andreas: Original Motion Picture Soundtrack	Vocalist
97	"Boy Problems"	2015	Carly Rae Jepsen	Emotion	Co-writer
98	"Making the Most of the Night"	2015	Carly Rae Jepsen	Emotion	Co-writer
99	"Golden"	2015	Travie McCoy featuring Sia	Rough Water	Co-writer and featured artist
100	"Je Te Pardonne"	2015	Maître Gims featuring Sia	Mon cœur avait raison	Featured artist
101	"Try Everything"	2015	Shakira	Zootopia	Co-writer
102	"Round Your Little Finger"	2015	Katharine McPhee	Hysteria	Co-writer
103	"Like a River Runs"	2015	Bleachers	Terrible Thrills, Vol. 2	Featured artist
104	"One Candle"	2015	J Ralph	Racing Extinction Soundtrack	Co-writer and featured artist
105	"Jóia"	2015	Pabllo Vittar	Open Bar EP	Co-writer
106	"Rock Bottom"	2015	Marco Mengoni	Le cose che non-ho	Co-writer
107	"Oasis"	2016	Kygo featuring Foxes	Cloud Nine	Co-writer
108	"Angel by the Wings"	2016	Sia	The Eagle Huntress Soundtrack	Co-writer and vocalist
109	"Waving Goodbye"	2016	Sia	The Neon Demon soundtrack	Co-writer and vocalist
110	"Unforgettable"	2016	Sia	Finding Dory: Original Motion Picture Soundtrack	Vocalist
111	"Sledgehammer"	2016	Rihanna	Star Trek: Beyond Original Motion Picture Soundtrack	Co-writer
112	"Unstoppable (Perfect Isn't Pretty)"	2016	Sia featuring Ariel Rechtshaid, Pusha T and Olodum	Rio 2016 Olympic Games Film Soundtrack	Co-writer and vocalist
113	"Blackbird"	2016	Sia	The Beat Bugs soundtrack	Vocalist
114	"Telepathy"	2016	Christina Aguilera featuring Nile Rodgers	The Get Down soundtrack	Co-writer
115	"Satisfied"	2016	Sia featuring Miguel and Queen Latifah	The Hamilton Mixtape	Vocalist
116	"Never Give Up"	2016	Sia	Lion Movie Soundtrack	Co-writer and vocalist
117	"Toy Box"	2017	Mylene Cruz & The Soul Madonnas	The Get Down Part II Soundtrack	Co-writer
118	"Magical"	2017	Demi Lovato	Charming Soundtrack	Co-writer
119	"Balladino"	2017	Sia	Charming Soundtrack	Co-writer and vocalist
120	"Best Day Ever"	2017	Blondie	Pollinator	Co-writer
121	"Hey Hey Hey"	2017	Katy Perry	Witness	Co-writer
122	"Chained to the Rhythm" (featuring Skip Marley)	2017	Katy Perry	Witness	Co-writer and backing vocals
123	"Waterfall"	2017	Stargate	—N/a	Co-writer and vocalist
124	"Quit" (featuring Ariana Grande)	2017	Cashmere Cat	9	Co-writer
125	"Devil in Me"	2017	Halsey	Hopeless Fountain Kingdom	Co-writer
126	"Crying in the Club"	2017	Camila Cabello	—N/a	Co-writer and vocalist (uncredited)
127	"Volcano"	2017	Brooke Candy	—N/a	Co-writer
128	"Dusk Till Dawn"	2017	Zayn	Icarus Falls	Co-writer and featured vocalist
129	"Rainbow"	2017	Various	My Little Pony: The Movie	Writer and featured vocalist
130	"Galaxy"	2017	Dannii Minogue	—N/a	Co-writer
131	"Warrior"	2017	Paloma Faith	The Architect	Co-writer
132	"Champion"	2017	Fall Out Boy	Mania	Co-writer
133	"Deer in Headlights"	2018	Sia	Fifty Shades Freed: Original Motion Picture Soundtrack	Co-writer and vocalist
134	"Magic"	2018	Sia	A Wrinkle in Time (soundtrack)	Co-writer and vocalist
135	"Genius" (featuring Sia, Diplo and Labrinth)	2018	LSD	Labrinth, Sia & Diplo present... LSD	Co-writer and featured vocalist
136	"Audio" (featuring Sia, Diplo and Labrinth)	2018	LSD	Labrinth, Sia & Diplo present... LSD	Co-writer and featured vocalist
137	"Arrested" (featuring Norma Jean Martine)	2018	Love Thy Brother	—N/a	Co-writer
138	"Thunderclouds" (featuring Sia, Diplo and Labrinth)	2018	LSD	Labrinth, Sia & Diplo present... LSD	Co-writer and featured vocalist
139	"Limitless"	2018	Jennifer Lopez	Second Act Soundtrack	Co-writer
140	"Wrapped Up"	2018	Natalie Portman	Vox Lux Soundtrack	Co-writer
141	"Blinded By Love"	2018	Natalie Portman	Vox Lux Soundtrack	Co-writer
142	"Firecracker"	2018	Natalie Portman	Vox Lux Soundtrack	Co-writer
143	"Sweat and Tears"	2018	Natalie Portman	Vox Lux Soundtrack	Co-writer
144	"Private Girl"	2018	Natalie Portman	Vox Lux Soundtrack	Co-writer
145	"EKG"	2018	Natalie Portman	Vox Lux Soundtrack	Co-writer
146	"Alive"	2018	Raffey Cassidy	Vox Lux Soundtrack	Co-writer
147	"Your Body Talk"	2018	Raffey Cassidy	Vox Lux Soundtrack	Co-writer
148	"Hologram (Smoke and Mirrors)"	2018	Raffey Cassidy	Vox Lux Soundtrack	Co-writer
149	"Anthem"	2018	Scott Walker	Vox Lux Soundtrack	Co-writer
150	"Mountains" (featuring Sia, Diplo and Labrinth)	2018	LSD	Labrinth, Sia & Diplo present... LSD	Co-writer and featured vocalist
151	"The Day That You Moved On" (featuring Sia)	2018	TQX	Global Intimacy	Co-writer and featured vocalist
152	"The Day That You Moved On (Remix)" (featuring Sia, Ellis Miah and Abhi The Nomad)	2018	TQX	Global Intimacy	Co-writer and featured vocalist
152	"Text Me Back" (featuring Sirah and Kool A.D.)	2018	TQX	Global Intimacy	Co-writer
154	"Facebook Killed The Arts" (featuring Josh Mease)	2018	TQX	Global Intimacy	Co-writer
155	"No New Friends" (featuring Sia, Diplo and Labrinth)	2019	LSD	Labrinth, Sia & Diplo present... LSD	Co-writer and featured vocalist
156	"Welcome to the Wonderful World Of" (featuring Sia, Diplo and Labrinth)	2019	LSD	Labrinth, Sia & Diplo present... LSD	Co-writer and featured vocalist
157	"Angel in Your Eyes" (featuring Sia, Diplo and Labrinth)	2019	LSD	Labrinth, Sia & Diplo present... LSD	Co-writer and featured vocalist
158	"Heaven Can Wait" (featuring Sia, Diplo and Labrinth)	2019	LSD	Labrinth, Sia & Diplo present... LSD	Co-writer and featured vocalist
159	"It's Time" (featuring Sia, Diplo and Labrinth)	2019	LSD	Labrinth, Sia & Diplo present... LSD	Co-writer and featured vocalist
160	"Genius (Lil Wayne remix)" (featuring Lil Wayne, Sia, Diplo and Labrinth)	2019	LSD	Labrinth, Sia & Diplo present... LSD	Co-writer and featured vocalist
161	"Courage"	2019	P!nk	Hurts 2B Human	Co-writer
162	"Lying Down"	2019	Celine Dion	Courage	Co-writer and backing vocals
163	"Baby"	2019	Celine Dion	Courage	Co-writer and backing vocals
164	"Heart of Glass"	2019	Celine Dion	Courage	Co-writer and backing vocals
165	"Oblivion"	2019	Labrinth	Imagination & the Misfit Kid	Co-writer and featured vocalist
166	"Chasing Paper"	2019	Giordana Petralia	—N/a	Co-writer
167	"What the Future Holds"	2020	Steps	What the Future Holds	Co-writer
168	"Fireprayer"	2021	Arca	Kick IIIII	Co-writer
169	"Like Water"	2021	Alicia Keys	Keys	Co-writer
170	"Victory"	2022	Sugababes	The Lost Tapes	Co-writer
171	"Violet Chemistry"	2023	Miley Cyrus	Endless Summer Vacation	Co-writer
172	"Muddy Feet"	2023	Miley Cyrus featuring Sia	Endless Summer Vacation	Co-writer and featured vocalist
173	"Every Day is Halloween"	2023	Kate Pierson	Radios & Rainbows	Co-writer
174	"ADHD"	2024	Paris Hilton	Infinite Icon	Co-writer
175	"If the Earth is Spinning"	2024	Paris Hilton	Infinite Icon	Co-writer and featured vocalist
176	"Angels Together Overture"	2025	The Voices of Saturday Church	Saturday Church (Official Concept Album)	Co-writer
177	"Sunday"	2025	The Voices of Saturday Church	Saturday Church (Official Concept Album)	Co-writer
178	"Door to the Dance Floor"	2025	The Voices of Saturday Church	Saturday Church (Official Concept Album)	Co-writer
179	"House on Fire"	2025	The Voices of Saturday Church	Saturday Church (Official Concept Album)	Co-writer
180	"Brick by Brick"	2025	The Voices of Saturday Church	Saturday Church (Official Concept Album)	Co-writer
181	"Blinded by Love"	2025	The Voices of Saturday Church	Saturday Church (Official Concept Album)	Co-writer
182	"Let It Go Kid"	2025	The Voices of Saturday Church	Saturday Church (Official Concept Album)	Co-writer
183	"Beyond"	2025	The Voices of Saturday Church	Saturday Church (Official Concept Album)	Co-writer
184	"Everything You Needed"	2025	Josh Groban	Hidden Gems	Co-writer
185	"Feels Like Heaven"	2026	Loreen	Wildfire	Co-writer
186	"weirdness"	2026	Jagwar Twin	lucius lullaby	Co-writer
187	"Chakzilla"	2026	Chaka Khan	Chakzilla	Co-writer
188	"Boogie's in My Soul"	2026	Chaka Khan featuring Snoop Dogg	Chakzilla	Co-writer
189	"Curious Subject"	2026	Chaka Khan	Chakzilla	Co-writer
190	"Cool You Down"	2026	Chaka Khan fearuring Sia	Chakzilla	Co-writer and featured vocalist
191	"I Know You Can"	2026	Chaka Khan	Chakzilla	Co-writer
192	"Bring the Party"	2026	Chaka Khan featuring Lenny Kravitz	Chakzilla	Co-writer
193	"Always Love the Challenge"	2026	Chaka Khan	Chakzilla	Co-writer
194	"Heart of Gold"	2026	Chaka Khan	Chakzilla	Co-writer
195	"Now and Forever"	2026	Chaka Khan	Chakzilla	Co-writer
196	"Dreamy Stuff"	2026	Chaka Khan	Chakzilla	Co-writer

== Music videos ==
Title	Year	Performer	Director	Actress	Director(s)	Notes	Ref.
"Taken for Granted" (Original Version)	2000	Yes	No	Yes	Matthew Bate		
"Taken for Granted" (Alternative Version)	2000	Yes	No	Yes	Fatima Robinson		
"Little Man"	2000	Yes	No	Yes	Cassius Coleman		
"Breathe Me"	2004	Yes	Yes	Yes	Herself, Daniel Askill		
"Numb"	2004	Yes	Yes	No	Herself, Clemens Habicht		
"Sunday"	2006	Yes	Yes	Yes	Herself		
"Don't Bring Me Down"	2006	Yes	No	Yes	Nik Fackler		
"Pictures"	2007	Yes	Yes	Yes	Herself		
"Buttons"	2007	Yes	No	Yes	Kris Moyes		
"Day Too Soon"	2008	Yes	No	Yes	Cat Solen		
"The Girl You Lost to Cocaine"	2008	Yes	No	Yes	Kris Moyes		
"Soon We'll Be Found"	2008	Yes	No	Yes	Claire Carré		
"You've Changed"	2009	Yes	No	Yes	Dennis Liu		
"Clap Your Hands"	2010	Yes	No	Yes	Kris Moyes		
"I'm in Here"	2010	Yes	No	Yes	David Altobelli		
"Chandelier"	2014	Yes	Yes	No	Herself, Daniel Askill	Also writer	
"You're Never Fully Dressed Without a Smile"	2014	Yes	No	No	Unknown		
"Elastic Heart"	2015	Yes	Yes	No	Herself, Daniel Askill		
"Big Girls Cry"	2015	Yes	Yes	No	Herself, Daniel Askill		
"Fire Meet Gasoline"	2015	Yes	No	No	Francesco Carrozzini		
"Alive"	2015	Yes	Yes	No	Herself, Daniel Askill		
"Cheap Thrills" (featuring Sean Paul)	2016	Yes	No	No	Lior Molcho		
"Cheap Thrills" (Performance Edit)	2016	Yes	Yes	No	Herself, Daniel Askill	Also writer	
"The Greatest"	2016	Yes	Yes	No	Herself, Daniel Askill		
"Never Give Up"	2017	Yes	No	No	Lior Molcho		
"Move Your Body" (Single Mix)	2017	Yes	No	No	Lior Molcho		
"Rainbow"	2017	Yes	No	No	Daniel Askill	Also writer	
"Santa's Coming for Us"	2017	Yes	No	No	Marc Klasfeld		
"Candy Cane Lane"	2017	Yes	No	No	Lior Molcho		
"Ho Ho Ho"	2017	Yes	No	No	Lior Molcho		
"Underneath the Mistletoe"	2017	Yes	No	No	Lior Molcho		
"Flames"	2018	Yes	No	No	Lior Molcho		
"Audio"	2018	Yes	No	No	Ernest Desumbila		
"Thunderclouds"	2018	Yes	No	Yes	Ernest Desumbila		
"No New Friends"	2019	Yes	No	Yes	Dano Cerny		
"Together"	2020	Yes	Yes	No	Herself	Also writer; Based on her film "Music"	
"Let's Love" (with David Guetta)	2020	Yes	No	No	Hannah Lux Davis		
"Del Mar" (with Ozuna & Doja Cat)	2020	Yes	No	No	Nuno Gomes		
"Snowman"	2020	Yes	No	No	Lior Molcho		
"Hey Boy" (featuring Burna Boy)	2021	Yes	No	No	Rafatoon		
"Floating Through Space" (with David Guetta)	2021	Yes	No	No	Lior Molcho		
"Fly Me to the Moon"	2021	Yes	No	No	Unknown	Created in collaboration with Square Enix to celebrate the release of the Endwalker update to Final Fantasy XIV	
"Gimme Love"	2023	Yes	Yes	Yes	Herself		
"Hass Hass" (with Diljit Dosanjh)	2023	Yes	No	No	Unknown		

=== Featured videos ===
Title	Year	Performer	Actress	Director(s)	Ref.
"I'll Forget You" (Lior featuring Sia)	2008	Yes	No	Natasha Pincus	
"I Love It" (Carl Allison & Nick Kozakis Version) (Hilltop Hoods featuring Sia)	2011	Yes	No	Carl Allison, Nick Kozakis	
"I Love It" (Animal Logic Version) (Hilltop Hoods featuring Sia)	2011	Yes	No	Toby Grime	
"I Love It" (Blue Tongue Version) (Hilltop Hoods featuring Sia)	2011	Yes	No	Nash Edgerton	
"Titanium" (David Guetta featuring Sia)	2011	Yes	No	David Wilson	
"Wild Ones" (Flo Rida featuring Sia)	2012	Yes	No	Erik White	
"She Wolf (Falling to Pieces)" (David Guetta featuring Sia)	2012	Yes	No	Hiro Murai	
"Battle Cry" (Angel Haze featuring Sia)	2014	Yes	No	Frank Borin	
"Guts Over Fear" (Eminem featuring Sia)	2014	Yes	No	Syndrome	
"Déjà Vu" (Giorgio Moroder featuring Sia)	2015	Yes	No	Alexandra Dahlström	
"Golden" (Travie McCoy featuring Sia)	2015	Yes	No	Unknown	
"Bang My Head" (David Guetta featuring Sia and Fetty Wap)	2015	Yes	No	Hannah Lux Davis	
"Wolves" (Kanye West featuring Sia and Vic Mensa)	2016	Yes	Yes	Steven Klein	
"Waterfall" (Stargate featuring P!nk and Sia)	2017	Yes	No	Malia James	
"Living Out Loud" (Brooke Candy featuring Sia)	2017	Yes	No	Simon Cahn	
"Dusk Till Dawn" (Zayn featuring Sia)	2017	Yes	No	Marc Webb	
"Exhale" (kenzie featuring Sia)	2020	Yes	No	Unknown	
"Don't Give Up" (Sam I featuring Sia, Busta Rhymes and Vic Mensa)	2020	Yes	No	Sam I	
"Titans" (Major Lazer featuring Sia and Labrinth)	2021	Yes	No	Ernest Desumbila	
"Born Yesterday" (Arca featuring Sia)	2021	Yes	No	KinkiFactory	
"Dynamite" (Sean Paul featuring Sia)	2021	Yes	No	Storm Saulter	

=== Guest appearances ===
Title	Year	Performer	Role	Director(s)	Notes	Ref.
"Imagine" (Gal Gadot & Friends)	2020	Yes	Herself	None		
