= Champion (Sia song) =

2024 song by Sia featuring Tierra Whack, Kaliii & Jimmy Jolliff

Song by Sia featuring Tierra Whack, Kaliii & Jimmy Jolliff

from the album Reasonable Woman
- Released: 3 May 2024
- Recorded: 2023
- Studio: The Ribcage (Los Angeles)
- Genre: Electropop; power pop; hip-hop
- Length: 2:41
- Label: Atlantic Records; Monkey Puzzle
- Songwriters: Sia Furler; Jesse Shatkin; Ernest Brown; Tierra Whack; Kaliya Ross; Jimmy Jolliff; Joshua Goods
- Producers: Jesse Shatkin; Charlie Heat

"Champion" is a song by Australian singer-songwriter Sia featuring American rappers Tierra Whack, Kaliii and Jimmy Jolliff. It appears as a track on her tenth studio album, Reasonable Woman (2024).

== Background and release ==
In September 2023, Sia announced her tenth studio album, Reasonable Woman, and released its lead single, "Gimme Love". "Champion" was first teased in July 2023, when it was used in promotional segments for FOX Sports' broadcast of the FIFA Women's World Cup Australia & New Zealand 2023.

== Personnel ==
- Sia – vocals, songwriting
- Tierra Whack – vocals, songwriting
- Kaliii – vocals, songwriting
- Jimmy Jolliff – vocals, songwriting
- Jesse Shatkin – songwriting, production, bass, brass, drums, engineering, keyboards, percussion, synthesizer, drum programming
- Tate Kobang – songwriting
- Charlie Heat – production
- Daniel Escobar – engineering
- Eli Heisler – assistant mix engineering mixing
- Jackie Wongso – marketing
- Samuel Dent – additional engineering
- Zeke Chabon – additional engineering
- Craig Kallman – A& R directing
- Irene Sourlis – A&R Administrating
- Rob Kinelski – mixing
- Chris Gehringer – mastering
