= The Neon Demon (soundtrack) =

2016 film score / soundtrack album

The Neon Demon (Original Motion Picture Soundtrack)
- Apple Music and limited edition CD and LP cover. Other editions feature a close-up of a model's red lips with the title and artist credit underneath.

Film score / soundtrack album by Cliff Martinez
- Released: June 24, 2016
- Recorded: 2016
- Genre: Film score; film soundtrack
- Length: 69:42
- Label: Milan
- Producer: Cliff Martinez

Cliff Martinez chronology
The Knick (2014)	The Neon Demon (Original Motion Picture Soundtrack) (2016)	War Dogs (2016)

The Neon Demon (Original Motion Picture Soundtrack) is the soundtrack to the 2016 film The Neon Demon, directed by Nicolas Winding Refn and starring Elle Fanning. The film score is composed by Cliff Martinez and the soundtrack features 23 tracks, with three songs being composed specifically for the film. The soundtrack was released under the Milan Records label on June 24, 2016.

== Development ==
The film score was composed by Cliff Martinez in his third collaboration with Refn, following Drive (2011) and Only God Forgives (2013). According to Martinez, he found the film's music to The Neon Demon had similarities to Drive, as it had a significant role in the film, and added "there's a lot of places where the music is really pushed out more into the spotlight, even more than Drive".

Martinez wrote over one hour of music which he described as a "sparse electronic score" predominantly using synthesizers. He described the first half resembling "the melodrama of Valley of the Dolls, and the second half reminiscent of The Texas Chainsaw Massacre." Martinez and Refn recalled that the soundtrack was influenced by the works of composers John Carpenter, Giorgio Moroder, Vangelis and bands such as Kraftwerk, Goblin and Tangerine Dream.

Besides Martinez' score, the film and the album featured three songs. Refn's son Juilan Winding contributed two tracks: "Demon Dance" and "Mine", the latter of which has been performed by Sweet Tempest. Sia also contributed an original song, "Waving Goodbye" featuring Diplo, which was also included on the album.

== Release ==
Milan Records distributed the soundtrack and released in digital and physical formats on June 24, 2016, followed by a vinyl edition, which was released on July 8.

== Reception ==
Aaron Vehling of Vehlinggo wrote "Martinez's exquisite art has taken an even bigger role in his journey with Refn. But beyond that, Martinez has demonstrated that he's able to convey virtually any mood a director requires while retaining shades of himself." Kaya Savas of Film.Music.Media wrote "The Neon Demon is an amazing accomplishment of sound and image." Randall Colburn of Consequence wrote "this score, in particular, is so integral to the completion of Refn's vision and the power of his visuals." Thomas H. Green of The Arts Desk wrote "It's no Drive OST, but there's cherry-picking to be done." Chris Alexander of ComingSoon.net wrote "This is most assuredly his work, its nods to the masters just that, there for fans to either consciously or subconsciously pick-up on and appreciate."

Todd McCarthy of The Hollywood Reporter described it as a "seductive score". Glenn Kenny of The New York Times wrote "Cliff Martinez's electronic score is also pastiche-like, but a far wittier concoction over all." Talia Soghomonian of Collider called it as a "brilliant score" that recreated "the ambience of the film and miraculously filling in some story gaps". David Lewis of SFGate wrote "Cliff Martinez's dazzling score sets a seductive, creepy tone." Trace Thurman of Bloody Disgusting wrote "Composer Cliff Martinez returns after partnering with Refn on Drive and Only God Forgives. Needless to say he does not disappoint here. He fills The Neon Demon with synth-heavy electronica and a dash of Sia for good measure. Like Martinez's other scores on Refn's films, the music is a character in and of itself."

Kenji Fujishima and Dom Sinacola of Paste ranked it as the ninth-best soundtrack and reviewed "Martinez's music is locked into the psyche of its main character: an underage fashion ingénue whose desire to make money off her good looks is reflected in music that seems to yearn, anguish and tremble with fear alongside her." Phil de Semlyen of Empire called it as "glossy, brooding and occasionally electrifying". Matthew Monagle of Film School Rejects wrote "Just as the film tries to make the fashion world seem both alluring and monstrous, so does Martinez build a score whose shallow electronic pop veneer peels back to reveal deeper layers of darkness."

== Track listing ==
The Neon Demon (Original Motion Picture Soundtrack) track listing
No.	Title	Artist(s)	Length
1.	"Neon Demon"		3:22
2.	"Mine"	Sweet Tempest	3:42
3.	"The Demon Dance"	Julian Winding	5:59
4.	"What Are You?"		1:39
5.	"Don't Forget Me When You're Famous"		1:33
6.	"Gold Paint Shoot"		2:50
7.	"Take Off Your Shoes"		1:43
8.	"Ruby at the Morgue"		1:50
9.	"Jesse Sneaks Into Her Room"		2:00
10.	"Real Lolita Rides Again"		2:47
11.	"Messenger Walks Among Us"		6:12
12.	"Runway"		4:30
13.	"Take Her to Measurements"		0:55
14.	"Who Wants Sour Milk"		1:09
15.	"I Would Never Say You're Fat"		2:20
16.	"Thank God You're Awake Remix"		2:19
17.	"Kinky"		4:17
18.	"Ruby's Close Up"		2:02
19.	"Lipstick Drawing"		2:33
20.	"Something's in My Room"		2:52
21.	"Are We Having a Party"		5:21
22.	"Get Her Out of Me"		3:50
23.	"Waving Goodbye"	Sia featuring Diplo	3:57
Total length:			69:42

== Accolades ==
Accolades for The Neon Demon (Original Motion Picture Soundtrack)
Award	Date of ceremony	Category	Result	Ref.
Austin Film Critics Association	December 28, 2016	Best Score	Nominated	
Cannes Film Festival	May 11–22, 2016	Soundtrack Award	Won	
Chicago Film Critics Association	December 15, 2016	Best Original Score	Nominated	
International Film Music Critics Association	February 9, 2017	Best Original Score for a Fantasy/Science Fiction/Horror Film	Nominated	
St. Louis Film Critics Association	December 18, 2016	Best Music/Score	Nominated	
Washington D.C. Area Film Critics Association	December 5, 2016	Best Score	Nominated	
