= Akimbo =

Akimbo may refer to:

- Akimbo (album), a 2000 album by Friendly
- Akimbo (band), an American hardcore punk band
- Akimbo (on-demand service), a defunct American video-on-demand service
- Akimbo, an American podcast by Seth Godin
- Akimbo, a 2021 album by Ziak
- Akimbo Systems, Inc., a defunct American software company that produced and sold the FullWrite Professional word processor
- Dual wielding, using two weapons, one in each hand
