= Immortal Queen =

2024 single by Sia featuring Chaka Khan

- Bianca Costa remix cover

Single by Sia featuring Chaka Khan

from the album Reasonable Woman
- Released: 3 May 2024
- Genre: R&B
- Length: 3:20
- Label: Monkey Puzzle; Atlantic Records
- Songwriters: Sia Furler; Greg Kurstin; Chaka Khan
- Producer: Greg Kurstin

Sia singles chronology
"Fame Won't Love You" (2024)	"Immortal Queen" (2024)	"I Forgive You" (2024)

Chaka Khan singles chronology
"Tekken 2" (2023)	"Immortal Queen" (2024)	"Chakzilla" (2026)

Bianca Costa singles chronology
"La Vengeance" (2024)	"Immortal Queen" (remix) (2024)	"Sous les étoiles" (2024)

Remix Cover
- Cover of the remix featuring Chaka Khan & Eve

Eve singles chronology
"What's Your Love Like" (2020)	"Immortal Queen" (remix) (2024)

Neneh Cherry singles chronology
"Wherever You Go" (2020)	"Immortal Queen" (remix) (2024)	"New Dawn" (2025)

Debbie Harry singles chronology
"IWNSLY" (2023)	"Immortal Queen" (remix) (2024)

Lyric video
- "Immortal Queen (feat. Chaka Khan)" on YouTube

"Immortal Queen" is a song by Australian singer-songwriter Sia featuring American singer Chaka Khan, recorded for Sia's album, Reasonable Woman. A lyric video for the song was released on 3 May 2024, and at the same day, the album came out. A remix featuring Brazilian-French singer Bianca Costa was released for digital download and streaming on 31 May 2024. Other remixes featuring Eve, Neneh Cherry or Debbie Harry were released in August 2024.

== Background ==
Sia announced Reasonable Woman in early 2024, revealing a diverse lineup of collaborations, including "Immortal Queen" with Chaka Khan. Khan first said she was working on the song during an interview with The Sydney Morning Herald in September 2023. Following the release of her single "Dance Alone," the tracklist of her album was announced, revealing that Khan and an unknown female artist would be featured on the track. Some fans and rumors suggested that the unknown female artist was Missy Elliott, but now that's no longer the case. In an interview with Flaunt, Sia revealed that "Immortal Queen" was inspired by Beyoncé, stating:

...I wrote it like a long long time ago, before I could ever think of calling myself a queen. I wrote it thinking about Beyoncé maybe 10 or 15 years ago. My managers were always telling me, 'Immortal Queen' is such a good song, it's such a good song'. And I thought that I could never sing it just by myself. I would have to have some queens on it, you know?"

— Sia on Flaunt

Sia continued, sharing the emotional moment when her managers contacted Chaka Khan to ask if she would feature on the song. Sia described her excitement, saying she could hardly believe the opportunity.

The song was also teased in ESPNW's coverage of the 2024 Women's Final Four in Cleveland, further increasing anticipation for its release.

== Composition ==
"Immortal Queen" is a R&B song. The sheet music for the song shows the key of F♯ minor and a tempo of 88 beats per minute.

== Reception ==
In a review of the album, Mark Kennedy from AP News said "Their new duet 'Immortal Queen' is everything you'd want in a combo of Sia and Khan — dueling soaring voices, preening egos and insane lyrics about time travel and robot servants." Pitchfork described the lyrics of "Immortal Queen" as "so incomprehensible they’re almost camp," citing its references to The Matrix, "cavemen bringing the cave queen carvings," and Queens Victoria and Sheba. The review criticized the song's lack of coherence, stating that it "makes no more sense in context, ping-ponging between uninspired synth arpeggios, than it does on paper."

== Personnel ==
- Sia – songwriting, vocals
- Chaka Khan – songwriting, vocals
- Greg Kurstin – songwriting, production, bass, mellotron, drums, engineering, keyboards, percussion, mixing, synthesizer
- Jackie Wongso – marketing
- Julian Burg – additional engineering
- Matt Tuggle – additional engineering
- Craig Kallman – A& R directing
- Chris Gehringer – mastering

== Track listing ==
Digital download – album track

1. "Immortal Queen" (feat. Chaka Khan) – 3:19

Digital download and streaming – (feat. Chaka Khan & Bianca Costa)

1. "Immortal Queen" (featuring Chaka Khan and Bianca Costa) – 3:21

Digital download and streaming – (feat. Chaka Khan & Eve)

1. "Immortal Queen" (featuring Chaka Khan and Eve) – 3:32

Digital download and streaming – (feat. Chaka Khan & Neneh Cherry)

1. "Immortal Queen" (featuring Chaka Khan and Neneh Cherry) – 3:34

Digital download and streaming – (feat. Chaka Khan & Debbie Harry)

1. "Immortal Queen" (featuring Chaka Khan and Debbie Harry) – 3:34

== Charts ==
Chart performance for "Immortal Queen"
Chart (2024)	Peak position
New Zealand Hot Singles (RMNZ)	22

== Release history ==
Region	Date	Format	Version	Label	Ref.
Various	31 May 2024	Digital download and streaming	Bianca Costa Remix	Atlantic Records	
Various	2 August 2024	Digital download and streaming	Eve Remix	Atlantic Records	
Various	17 August 2024	Digital download and streaming	Neneh Cherry Remix	Atlantic Records	
Various	30 August 2024	Digital download and streaming	Debbie Harry Remix	Atlantic Records	
