= Taken for Granted =

2000 single by Sia

Single by Sia

from the album Healing Is Difficult
- B-side: "Waiting for You"
- Released: 22 May 2000
- Genre: Trip hop; dance-pop; lounge
- Length: 4:35
- Label: Long Lost Brother
- Songwriter: Sia Furler
- Producer: Nigel Corsbie

Sia singles chronology
"Taken for Granted" (2000)	"Little Man" (2000)

"Taken for Granted" is a song by Australian singer Sia. Written by Sia and produced by Nigel Corsbie, it was released as Sia's debut single and as the lead single from her second studio album, Healing Is Difficult (2001), in May 2000. It heavily samples from Sergei Prokofiev's Montagues and Capulets. "Taken for Granted" peaked at number 10 on the UK Singles Chart and stayed on the chart for five weeks, topping the UK R&B Chart on the week of its debut. In Australia, the song was not released until February 2002, peaking at number 100 on the ARIA Singles Chart the following month.

== Release ==
In the UK, "Taken for Granted" was released two CD singles and a cassette single on 22 May 2000. A CD single was not released in Sia's native Australia until 18 February 2002.

== Chart performance ==
In May 2000, "Taken for Granted" debuted at its peak position of number 10 in the United Kingdom, topping the UK R&B Chart in the process. In March 2002, it had some success in Australia, peaking at number 100 on the ARIA Singles Chart.

== Track listings ==
UK CD1

1. "Taken for Granted" (radio edit)
2. "Taken for Granted" (Desert Eagle Discs mix)
3. "Taken for Granted" (M.V.P. mix)
4. "Taken for Granted" (Groove Chronicles mix)

UK CD2

1. "Taken for Granted" (radio edit)
2. "Waiting for You" (Restless Soul mix)
3. "Waiting for You" (Soul Brother mix)

UK 12-inch single

A. "Taken for Granted" (Groove Chronicles vocal)
B. "Taken for Granted" (Groove Chronicles instrumental)

UK cassette single

1. "Taken for Granted"
2. "Waiting for You"

Australian CD single

1. "Taken for Granted" (radio edit)
2. "Waiting for You" (Restless Soul mix)
3. "Waiting for You" (Soul Brother mix)
4. "Taken for Granted" (Desert Eagle Discs mix)

== Charts ==
Chart (2000–2002)	Peak position
Australia (ARIA)	100
Europe (Eurochart Hot 100)	40
Scotland Singles (OCC)	14
UK Singles (OCC)	10
UK Hip Hop/R&B (OCC)	1
UK Indie (OCC)	3
