= Drink to Get Drunk =

2001 single by Sia

Single by DifferentGear vs Sia

from the album Healing Is Difficult
- Released: 2001
- Length: 3:58
- Label: Long Lost Brother; INCredible; Sony Dance; Dance Pool
- Songwriters: Sia Furler; Sam Frank

DifferentGear singles chronology
"When the World Is Running Down" (2000)	"Drink to Get Drunk" (2001)	"Whingin' It" (2001)

Sia singles chronology
"Little Man" (2000)	"Drink to Get Drunk" (2001)	"Destiny" (2001)

"Drink to Get Drunk" is a song by Australian singer-songwriter Sia. It was included on her second studio album Healing Is Difficult (2001). The song was released as a single in 2001 after it was remixed by Gino Scaletti and Quinn Whalley (also known as DifferentGear).

== Track listing ==
CD maxi

1. "Drink to Get Drunk" (DifferentGear Radio Edit) -3:58
2. "Drink to Get Drunk" (DifferentGear Mix) - 7:53
3. "Drink to Get Drunk" (Make Mine a Becks Mix) - 6:16
4. "Drink to Get Drunk" (Album Version) - 3:37

== Charts ==
The song peaked at number 1 on the Belgian Dance Chart in January 2001.

=== Weekly charts ===
Chart (2001)	Peak position
Australia (ARIA)	110
Belgium (Ultratip Bubbling Under Flanders)	5
Netherlands (Single Top 100)	85
Italy (FIMI)	43
UK Singles (OCC)	91

== Cover versions ==
- In April 2002, British house DJ and producer Chris Lake released another remix of the song through Maelstrom Records.
- In October 2011, Dutch electronic dance music producer Sander van Doorn released a cover version through Spinnin Records.
