= Chakzilla =

Studio album by Chaka Khan
- Released: September 18, 2026
- Recorded: 2024—2026
- Studios: No Expectations (Los Angeles, CA); Sound Notion (Rochester, New York)
- Length: 33:40
- Labels: EarthSong; BMG
- Producer: Greg Kurstin

Chaka Khan chronology
Hello Happiness (2019)	Chakzilla (2026)

Singles from Chakzilla
- 1. "Chakzilla" Released: May 7, 2026; 2. "Boogie's in My Soul" Released: June 19, 2026; 3. "Curious Subject" Released: August 20, 2026

Chakzilla is the thirteenth studio album by the American singer and songwriter Chaka Khan, released on September 18, 2026. The album was preceded by three singles: "Chakzilla", "Boogie's in My Soul", and "Curious Subject".

== Background and release ==
Chakzilla was first teased with the simultaneous release of a single and music video for the title track, "Chakzilla", produced by Greg Kurstin and released on May 7, 2026. A second single and video, "Boogie's in My Soul" featuring rapper Snoop Dogg followed on June 19, along with an announcement of the release date of the album, track list, and confirmed collaborations. Khan confirmed in early 2025 that she was recording with Australian singer-songwriter Sia. Khan referred to her affectionately as her "goddaughter". Prior to this, they performed together at her 2023 induction into the Rock and Roll Hall of Fame.

Khan said of the work: "This album is about joy. It's about freedom. It's about loving yourself, loving each other, and finding your power no matter where you are in life. I've lived a lot of life since my last record, and I wanted these songs to celebrate that. This music is about being human, feelin' good, and stepping into our power."

Leading up to the album's release Khan launched multiple performances on the YouTube platform Colors. Khan began with a well received July performance of "Through the Fire", and in late August, debuted her third single "Curious Subject" on the platform, releasing both Colors performances as digital singles.

== Critical reception ==
In a review by The Arts Desk, Joe Muggs gave the album three out of five stars, describing Khan as "radiating presence and musicality" while praising the album's songs and beats, but criticised the overly modern take on disco, saying "hearing an originator interfaced with a hyper-real post-post-post-disco simulation is strange".

== Track listing ==
All tracks are written by Yvette Stevens, Sia Furler and Greg Kurstin, except "Boogie's in My Soul" (written with Calvin Broadus Jr.) and "Bring the Party" (written with Chris Braide).

Chakzilla track listing
No.	Title	Length
1.	"Chakzilla"	3:28
2.	"Boogie's in My Soul" (featuring Snoop Dogg)	3:42
3.	"Curious Subject"	3:54
4.	"Cool You Down" (featuring Sia)	3:30
5.	"I Know You Can"	2:53
6.	"Bring the Party" (featuring Lenny Kravitz)	3:57
7.	"Always Love the Challenge"	2:43
8.	"Heart of Gold"	3:30
9.	"Now and Forever"	3:21
10.	"Dreamy Stuff"	2:53
Total length:		33:40

== Personnel ==
Credits are adapted from Tidal.

- Chaka Khan – vocals, background vocals
- Greg Kurstin – drums, guitar, keyboards, synthesizer, production, engineering, mixing (all tracks); synth bass (tracks 1–5, 10), piano (1, 6–8), electric piano (2, 3, 5), Clavinet (2, 8), Wurlitzer organ (4), bass guitar (6–9)
- Sia – background vocals (all tracks), vocals (4, 8)
- Julian Burg – engineering
- Emily Lazar – mastering
- Bob DeMaa – mastering assistance
- Sam Polizzi – additional engineering (1–4)
- Jon Dretto – guitar (1, 2, 4, 7–10)
- Snoop Dogg – vocals (2)
- Christopher Gutierrez – engineering (2)
- Matt Tuggle – engineering (2)
- Shon Lawon – engineering (2)
- Lenny Kravitz – vocals, background vocals, guitar (6)

== Charts ==
Chart performance for Chakzilla
Chart (2026)	Peak position
French Physical Albums (SNEP)	116
Japanese Dance & Soul Albums (Oricon)	8
Japanese Download Albums (Billboard Japan)	50
Scottish Albums (Official Charts)	15
Swiss Albums (Schweizer Hitparade)	66
UK Albums Sales (Official Charts)	18
UK Independent Albums (Official Charts)	11
