= Healing Is Difficult =

Studio album by Sia
- Released: 28 May 2001
- Recorded: 1998–2000
- Genre: R&B; 2-step garage; soul jazz
- Length: 64:56
- Label: Long Lost Brother

Sia chronology
OnlySee (1997)	Healing Is Difficult (2001)	Colour the Small One (2004)

Singles from Healing Is Difficult
- 1. "Taken for Granted" Released: 22 May 2000; 2. "Little Man" Released: 18 September 2000; 3. "Drink to Get Drunk" Released: January 2001

Healing Is Difficult is the second studio album by Australian singer-songwriter Sia. It was released in the United Kingdom on 9 July 2001 and in the United States on 28 May 2002.

In the UK the album's first single "Taken for Granted" was released in early 2000 and peaked at number 10 on the UK Singles Chart. The follow-up "Little Man" peaked at number 85, and the song received a two-step garage remix which was popular at the time. A third single, "Drink to Get Drunk", was planned. However, only the "Different Gear" Remix received a limited release across Europe, promoted as "Different Gear vs. Sia". Its peak position was number 91 in the UK, 85 in the Netherlands, 55 in Belgium and number 1 on that country's dance chart. However, the album had no chart success in the United Kingdom due to lack of promotion.

The track "Sober and Unkissed" was originally featured on Sia's first solo album OnlySee under the title "Soon", and "I'm Not Important to You" was originally performed by Sia with her band Crisp for their album The Word and the Deal in 1996 as the track "Sia's Song".

== Singles ==
The first single, "Taken for Granted", entered and peaked at number 10 on the UK Singles Chart on 3 June 2000. Sia even performed the song on Jo Whiley's BBC Radio 1 radio show. The next two singles did not match the success of the first. In 2002 "Taken for Granted" peaked at number 100 on the Australian ARIA Singles Chart.

Chartifacts – 15 April 2002
No. 99 HEALING IS DIFFICULT – Sia Sia (See-AH) is an Australian singer/songwriter based in London who incorporates hip hop, funk and soul as a base for her incredible vocal styling and harmonies. Her first single Taken For Granted peaked at #10 on the UK chart but did not make such a dent in our local chart. Her influences range from Stevie Wonder to Lauryn Hill and Sting.

== Critical reception ==
Professional ratings
Review scores
Source	Rating
AllMusic	3.5/5 stars
The Guardian	4/5 stars

Andy Puleston of the BBC praised Healing Is Difficult as a bold and honest debut, highlighting Sia Furler's emotional songwriting inspired by personal tragedy. He noted the album's blend of R&B, two-step, and jazz influences, and commended Sia's vocal versatility across tracks like "Drink to Get Drunk", "Blow It All Away", and "Judge Me". Puleston also emphasized her charismatic stage presence and described her as a unique and powerful voice in contemporary music. Jon O'Brien of AllMusic described Healing Is Difficult as one of Sia's most personal and emotional records, written during a period of grief following the death of her boyfriend. O'Brien considered the album as a soul jazz album, and as an honest and underappreciated precursor to Sia's later success.

== Track listing ==
Standard edition
No.	Title	Writer(s)	Producer(s)	Length
1.	"Fear"	Sia Furler	Sia Furler; Sam Frank	5:11
2.	"Drink to Get Drunk"	Furler; Sam Frank		4:41
3.	"Taken for Granted"	Furler	Nigel Corsbie	4:35
4.	"Blow It All Away"	Furler; Blair MacKichan; Felix Howard; Kevin Armstrong	Blair Mackichan	4:40
5.	"Get Me"	Furler; Frank		3:13
6.	"I'm Not Important to You"	Furler; Frank		6:08
7.	"Sober and Unkissed"	Furler	Furler; Jesse Flavell	4:01
8.	"Healing Is Difficult"	Furler		5:24
9.	"Judge Me"	Furler; Frank		4:15
10.	"Little Man"	Furler; Frank		6:04
11.	"Insidiously"	Furler; Frank		8:50
Total length:				57:02

UK edition bonus tracks
No.	Title	Writer(s)	Length
12.	"Little Man" (Exemen Works)	Furler; Frank	5:01
13.	"Drink to Get Drunk" (Different Gear Mix)	Furler; Frank	7:54
Total length:			69:57

Australian edition bonus track
No.	Title	Writer(s)	Length
12.	"Drink to Get Drunk" (Different Gear Remix)	Furler; Frank	7:54
Total length:			64:56

10th anniversary edition bonus tracks
No.	Title	Writer(s)	Length
13.	"Taken for Granted" (Groove Chronicles Remix)	Furler	5:19
14.	"Taken for Granted" (Desert Eagle Discs Mix)	Furler	4:19
15.	"Taken for Granted" (Restless Soul Remix)	Furler	7:02
16.	"Taken for Granted" (Soul Brother Remix)	Furler	5.22
17.	"Taken for Granted" (Mvp Remix)	Furler	4:58
18.	"Judge Me" (Siksense Remix)	Furler; Frank	5:35
19.	"Little Man" (Exemen Works)	Furler; Frank	5:04
Total length:			102:35

== Personnel ==
- Sia Furler – vocals, background vocals
- Otto Williams – bass (1,7)
- Quadraphonic (Richard Louis Simmonds and Tony Rapacioli) – violin (3)
- Isobel Dunn – arrangement, viola (4)
- Blair MacKichan – violin, producer (4)
- Jesse Flavell – guitar, producer (7)
- Camille – violin, viola, cello (4)
- Violet – strings arrangements, strings (3)
- Rod Youngs – drums

== Charts ==
Chart performance for Healing Is Difficult
Chart (2001–2002)	Peak position
Australian Albums (ARIA)	99
