= Dance Alone (song) =

2024 single by Sia and Kylie Minogue

Single by Sia and Kylie Minogue

from the album Reasonable Woman
- Released: 7 February 2024
- Studio: Echo Park Studios (Los Angeles); The Ribcage (Los Angeles)
- Genre: Pop; disco; dance-pop
- Length: 2:52
- Label: Monkey Puzzle; Atlantic
- Songwriters: Sia Furler; Jesse Shatkin
- Producers: Jesse Shatkin; Jim-E Stack

Sia singles chronology
"Hass Hass" (2023)	"Dance Alone" (2024)	"Incredible" (2024)

Kylie Minogue singles chronology
"Hold on to Now" (2023)	"Dance Alone" (2024)	"Midnight Ride" (2024)

Audio sample
- file; help

Music video
- "Dance Alone" on YouTube

"Dance Alone" is a song by Australian singer-songwriters Sia and Kylie Minogue. It was released on 7 February 2024 by Atlantic Records as the second single from Sia's tenth studio album, Reasonable Woman. It is also included on Minogue's seventeenth studio album, Tension II (2024).

== Background and release ==
In September 2023, Sia announced her tenth studio album, Reasonable Woman, and released its lead single, "Gimme Love". In the same month, Kylie Minogue released her sixteenth studio album, Tension, to critical acclaim. Sia and Minogue had previously collaborated on the latter's twelfth studio album, Kiss Me Once (2014), with Sia executive producing the album and co-writing two songs. "Dance Alone" was first teased before a show at Minogue's residency in Las Vegas at the end of January 2024. It was then announced via social media on 1 February, and released alongside its lyric video on 7 February.

== Music video ==
The music video for "Dance Alone" was released on 15 March 2024; it was directed by Dano Cerny, with chronography by Shay Latukolan, assisted by Oriane Nlate. Described as a "colourful" and "psychedelic" video, it features Minogue, and a quartet of dancers in Sia's signature black and blonde wigs.

== Personnel ==
- Sia – songwriting, vocals
- Kylie Minogue – vocals, vocal engineering
- Jesse Shatkin – songwriting, production, bass, drum programming, drums, engineering, keyboards, percussion, synthesizer
- Jim-E Stack – production, bass, drum programming, keyboards, percussion, synthesizer
- Eli Teplin – keyboards
- Ezekiel Chabon – additional engineering
- Samuel Dent – additional engineering
- Chris Gehringer – mastering
- Craig Kallman – A& R directing
- Serban Ghenea – mixing
- Jackie Wongso – marketing

== Track listing ==
- Digital download and streaming
1. "Dance Alone" – 2:52
- Digital download and streaming – Ofenbach remix
1. "Dance Alone" (Ofenbach Remix) – 2:36
2. "Dance Alone" (Ofenbach Extended Remix) – 3:29
3. "Dance Alone" – 2:52
- Digital download and streaming – Kito remix
1. "Dance Alone" (Kito Remix) – 3:09
2. "Dance Alone" – 2:52
- Digital download and streaming – remixes EP
1. "Dance Alone" – 2:52
2. "Dance Alone" (Ofenbach Remix) – 2:36
3. "Dance Alone" (Kito Remix) – 3:09
4. "Dance Alone" (Malibu Babie Remix) – 3:07
5. "Dance Alone" (Pure Shores Remix) – 2:44
6. "Dance Alone" (Gab Rhome Remix) – 3:25
7. "Dance Alone" (Extended Mix) – 4:05
8. "Dance Alone" (Slowed Down) – 3:35
9. "Dance Alone" (Sped Up) – 2:29

== Charts ==
=== Weekly charts ===
Weekly chart performance for "Dance Alone"
Chart (2024–2025)	Peak position
Australian Artist Singles (ARIA)	12
Australia Independent (AIR)	1
Belarus Airplay (TopHit)	22
CIS Airplay (TopHit)	40
Croatia International Airplay (Top lista)	10
Estonia Airplay (TopHit)	13
Hungary (Rádiós Top 40)	3
Japan Hot Overseas (Billboard Japan)	12
Kazakhstan Airplay (TopHit)	59
Latvia Airplay (TopHit)	1
Lebanon Airplay (Lebanese Top 20)	15
Lithuania Airplay (TopHit)	9
Netherlands (Tipparade)	25
New Zealand Hot Singles (RMNZ)	19
Nicaragua Anglo (Monitor Latino)	5
Romania Airplay (TopHit)	121
Russia Airplay (TopHit)	47
South Korea BGM (Circle)	129
South Korea Download (Circle)	194
UK Singles (Official Charts)	60
US Dance Airplay (Billboard)	7
US Hot Dance/Electronic Songs (Billboard)	8

=== Monthly charts ===
Monthly chart performance for "Dance Alone"
Chart (2024)	Peak position
Belarus Airplay (TopHit)	27
CIS Airplay (TopHit)	43
Estonia Airplay (TopHit)	22
Latvia Airplay (TopHit)	5
Lithuania Airplay (TopHit)	10
Russia Airplay (TopHit)	52

=== Year-end charts ===
2024 year-end chart performance for "Dance Alone"
Chart (2024)	Position
Belarus Airplay (TopHit)	74
CIS Airplay (TopHit)	135
Estonia Airplay (TopHit)	111
Hungary (Rádiós Top 40)	23
Russia Airplay (TopHit)	157

2025 year-end chart performance for "Dance Alone"
Chart (2025)	Position
Hungary (Rádiós Top 40)	74

== Release history ==
Release dates and formats for "Dance Alone"
Region	Date	Format	Label	Ref.
Various	7 February 2024	Digital download; streaming	Atlantic	
Italy	23 February 2024	Radio airplay	Warner	
