= Hass Hass =

2023 song by Diljit Dosanjh and Sia

Single by Diljit Dosanjh, Sia and Greg Kurstin (Note: Producer Greg Kurstin is credited as a lead artist on download and streaming services)
- Language: English; Punjabi
- Released: 26 October 2023
- Recorded: July 2023
- Length: 3:34
- Label: Warner Music India
- Songwriters: Sia Furler; Diljit Dosanjh; Greg Kurstin; Inder Bajwa
- Producer: Greg Kurstin

Diljit Dosanjh singles chronology
"Lalkara" (2023)	"Hass Hass" (2023)	"Ghost" (2023)

Sia singles chronology
"Gimme Love" (2023)	"Hass Hass" (2023)	"Dance Alone" (2024)

Music video
- "Hass Hass" on YouTube

"Hass Hass" is a song by Indian singer Diljit Dosanjh and Australian singer-songwriter Sia. It was released as a single on 26 October 2023 by Warner Music India. The song was written by Dosanjh and Sia with Greg Kurstin and Inder Bajwa, with Kurstin producing.

== Background and release ==
In July 2023, Diljit Dosanjh shared photos of himself and Sia in a recording studio via social media. In September, Sia released her single "Gimme Love" and Dosanjh released his 17th full-length album, Ghost. Although fans initially assumed a collaboration with Sia would be featured on Ghost, Dosanjh confirmed that he had been working on two albums simultaneously, one of which would be a collaboration album.

On 25 October, Dosanjh and Sia announced on their respective social media accounts that "Hass Hass" would be released the following day. The song was released on 26 October, alongside its music video.

== Charts ==
=== Weekly charts ===
Weekly Chart performance for "Hass Hass"
Chart (2023)	Peak position
Canada Hot 100 (Billboard)	37
India (Billboard)	7
India International (IMI)	1
UK Asian (OCC)	1
UK Punjabi (OCC)	1

=== Year-end charts ===
Year-end chart performance for "Hass Hass"
Chart (2024)	Position
India International (IMI)	1
