= Friendly (musician) =

Friendly (born Andrew Kornweibel) is a breaks' producer and DJ. Originally from Australia he is now based in London.

Friendly's debut album, Hello Bellybutton (released on his own Gulp Communications label), was nominated for Best Dance Release at the 1998 ARIA Music Awards. The follow-up album, Akimbo debuted at #20 on the Australian albums chart.

== Discography ==
=== Studio albums ===
Year	Album details	Peak chart positions
Year	Album details	AUS
1998	Hello Bellybutton: Released: 1998; Label: Gulp Communications (GCCD005)	-
2000	Akimbo: Released: July 2000; Label: Silvertone Records (SILV007)	22

=== Compilation albums ===
Year	Album details
2004	10 Things You Need To Know About Friendly: Released: 2004 (UK); Label: Fat! Records (CTFATCD002)
2005	Chew The Fat! At The End Presents: Friendly: Released: 2005 (UK); Label: Fat! Records ( CTFATCD003)

=== Extended plays ===
Year	EP details
2000	The Sound of You: Released: November 2000; Label: Silvertone Records (SILV010)

=== Singles ===
Year	Title	Peak chart positions	Album
Year	Title	AUS	Album
1997	"Jam on This"	—	Hello Bellybutton
1999	"Some Kind of Love Song"	45	Akimbo
2000	"My Mother Was a Deejay"	89	Akimbo
2000	" I Love You But..."	42	Akimbo
2003	"Glottal Stomp / Foot Rocker"	—	10 Things You Need To Know About Friendly
2003	"S&M"	—	10 Things You Need To Know About Friendly
2003	"Greedy"	—	10 Things You Need To Know About Friendly
2004	"Fetish"	—	10 Things You Need To Know About Friendly
2004	"The Bump 'N' Grind / Jack (So Ride Me)"	—	Chew The Fat! At The End Presents: Friendly
2005	"Nobody"	—	non-album single
2006	"Homeboys Cry Out for More" / "Ride Baby Ride"	—	non-album single
2009	"It's the Weekend"	—	non-album single

== Awards ==
=== ARIA Music Awards ===
The ARIA Music Awards is an annual awards ceremony that recognises excellence, innovation, and achievement across all genres of Australian music. They commenced in 1987. Friendly were nominated for four awards.

Year	Nominee / work	Award	Result
1998	Hello Bellybutton	Best Dance Release	Nominated
