= Little Man (Sia song) =

2000 song by Sia

Single by Sia

from the album Healing Is Difficult
- Released: 18 September 2000
- Recorded: 2000
- Genre: Downtempo; trip hop; UK garage (Exemen remix)
- Length: 6:05
- Label: Long Lost Brother
- Songwriters: Sia Furler; Sam Frank

Sia singles chronology
"Taken for Granted" (2000)	"Little Man" (2000)	"Drink to Get Drunk" (2001)

"Little Man" is a song by Australian singer-songwriter Sia. It was released in the United Kingdom and Ireland on 18 September 2000, as the second single from her second studio album, Healing Is Difficult (2001). "Little Man" was remixed by UK garage musician Wookie (under the alias Exemen) and was a popular club hit. The song debuted and peaked at number 82 in the United Kingdom.

In an interview in 2014, Sia spoke of her admiration for Amy Winehouse and said Winehouse covered the song at the Chateau Marmont and told Sia, "That's one of my favourite songs."

== Music ==
"Little Man" is set in the key of E minor.

== Impact and legacy ==
In November 2016, UK duo Gorgon City compiled a list of their top UK garage songs for Billboard, with "Little Man (Exemen Remix)" at #4. In May 2019, The Guardian listed the Exemen remix of "Little Man" at number 10 in their list of "The best UK garage tracks - ranked!".

In September 2019, NME included the remix in their "25 essential UK garage anthems" list. Capital Xtra included the remix in their list of "The Best Old-School Garage Anthems of All Time".

== Track listings ==
CD 1

1. "Little Man" (2002 mix) – 3:22
2. "Little Man" (Exemen works) – 5:01
3. "Little Man" (Exemen dub) – 5:02
4. "Little Man" (Sean's Brother works) – 4:51

CD 2

1. "Little Man" (2002 mix) – 3:22
2. "Little Man" (Sam's original demo) – 4:26
3. Enhanced video

== Charts ==
Chart (2000)	Peak position
UK Singles (Official Charts)	82
UK Independent (Official Charts)	13

== Cover versions ==
- Amy Winehouse
- Delilah in 2011
