= Boogie's in My Soul =

Single by Chaka Khan featuring Snoop Dogg

from the album Chakzilla
- Released: June 26, 2026
- Recorded: 2025–2026
- Genre: Dance-pop
- Length: 3:42
- Label: BMG
- Songwriters: Yvette Stevens; Greg Kurstin; Sia Furler; Calvin Cordozar Broadus Jr.
- Producer: Greg Kurstin

Chaka Khan singles chronology
"Chakzilla" (2026)	"Boogie's in My Soul" (2026)	"Curious Subject" (2026)

Snoop Dogg singles chronology
"Ghost" (2026)	"Boogie's in My Soul" (2026)

Music video
- "Boogie's in My Soul" on YouTube

"Boogie's in My Soul" is a song by American singer and songwriter Chaka Khan featuring rap verses from Snoop Dogg. It was released on June 19, 2026, through EarthSong Records under exclusive license to BMG Rights Management, as the second single from Khan's thirteenth studio album Chakzilla.

== Background and composition ==
"There's nothing you can do to ever erase this. It's in your system, now let it get into your soul."

— Snoop Dogg on the song,

According to People magazine, "Boogie's in My Soul" is a dance-pop song that opens with Snoop Dogg interpolating Melle Mel's "Chaka Khan" chant from Khan’s 1984 single "I Feel for You". The lyrics include themes of self-expression and encouragement, including the line "show the world your light".

"Boogie's in My Soul" was produced by Greg Kurstin, who also co-wrote the track alongside Sia, Khan, and Snoop Dogg. The song's music video was filmed at The Beehive in Los Angeles, and features the two artists performing to a crowd at a party.

== Charts ==
=== Weekly charts ===
Weekly chart performance
Chart (2026)	Peak position
Croatia International Airplay (Top lista)	68
Germany Urban Charts (DUC)	1
Lithuania Airplay (TopHit)	50
Malta Airplay (Radiomonitor)	18
Nicaragua Anglo Airplay (Monitor Latino)	3
North Macedonia Airplay (Radiomonitor)	4
UK Airplay (Radiomonitor)	6
UK Singles Sales (OCC)	27
UK Singles Downloads (OCC)	22
US Rhythmic Airplay (Billboard)	34

=== Monthly charts ===
2026 monthly chart performance
Chart (2026)	Peak position
Lithuania Airplay (TopHit)	95

== Release history ==
Release dates and formats for "Boogie's' in My Soul"
Region	Date	Format	Label	Ref.
Various	June 19, 2026	Digital download; streaming	BMG	
Italy	June 19, 2026	Radio airplay	BMG	
