= Incredible (Sia song) =

2024 single by Sia featuring Labrinth

- Original cover from the social media and YouTube video; the cover art on streaming services is the album cover

Single by Sia featuring Labrinth

from the album Reasonable Woman
- Released: 5 April 2024
- Recorded: 2018
- Genre: Pop
- Length: 3:34
- Label: Monkey Puzzle; Atlantic
- Songwriters: Sia Furler; Timothy McKenzie
- Producers: Labrinth; Nathaniel Ledwidge

Sia singles chronology
"Dance Alone" (2024)	"Incredible" (2024)	"Fame Won't Love You" (2024)

Labrinth singles chronology
"Never Felt So Alone" (2023)	"Incredible" (2024)	"S.W.M.F." (2025)

Audio video
- "Incredible" on YouTube

"Incredible" is a song by Australian singer-songwriter Sia featuring British musician and rapper Labrinth. It was released on 5 April 2024 by Atlantic Records as the third single from Sia's tenth studio album, Reasonable Woman.

The song is featured in the video game EA Sports FC 25 by EA Sports.

The song was featured in the official trailer for the Samsung Galaxy S25, serving as the campaign’s primary musical theme on January 22, 2025.

== Background ==
“Incredible” was originally recorded in 2018 during the sessions for LSD’s debut album, Labrinth, Sia & Diplo Present… LSD. The track was first previewed in the final trailer for the 2018 black comedy film Assassination Nation, released in September of that year. Although featured in the trailer, the song was not included in the film’s official soundtrack and was ultimately left off the LSD album.

Years later, the track found new life when it was included in Sia’s 2024 album Reasonable Woman. Prior to its official release, “Incredible” was used extensively in promos for the 2024 NBA Finals aired on ABC between January to March, building anticipation for its launch.

== Live performance ==
On 7 February 2024, Sia and Labrinth performed “Incredible” live at Cartier’s “100 Years of Trinity” event at the Petit Palais in Paris.

== Release and promotion ==
- Teased: September 2018 – Trailer for Assassination Nation.
- Promotional Use: January to March 2024 – ABC promos for the 2024 NBA Finals.
- Official Release: April 5, 2024 – As the third single from Reasonable Woman.

== Personnel ==
- Sia – songwriting, vocals
- Labrinth – songwriting, vocals, mixing, production
- Nathaniel Ledwidge – production
- Jackie Wongso – marketing
- Craig Kallman – A&R direction
- Irene Sourlis – A&R administration
- Chris Gehringer – mastering

== Charts ==
Chart performance for "Incredible"
Chart (2024–2025)	Peak position
Kazakhstan Airplay (TopHit)	72
Latvia Airplay (TopHit)	3
New Zealand Hot Singles (RMNZ)	35
South Korea BGM (Circle)	83
