= Reasonable Woman (album) =

2024 studio album by Sia

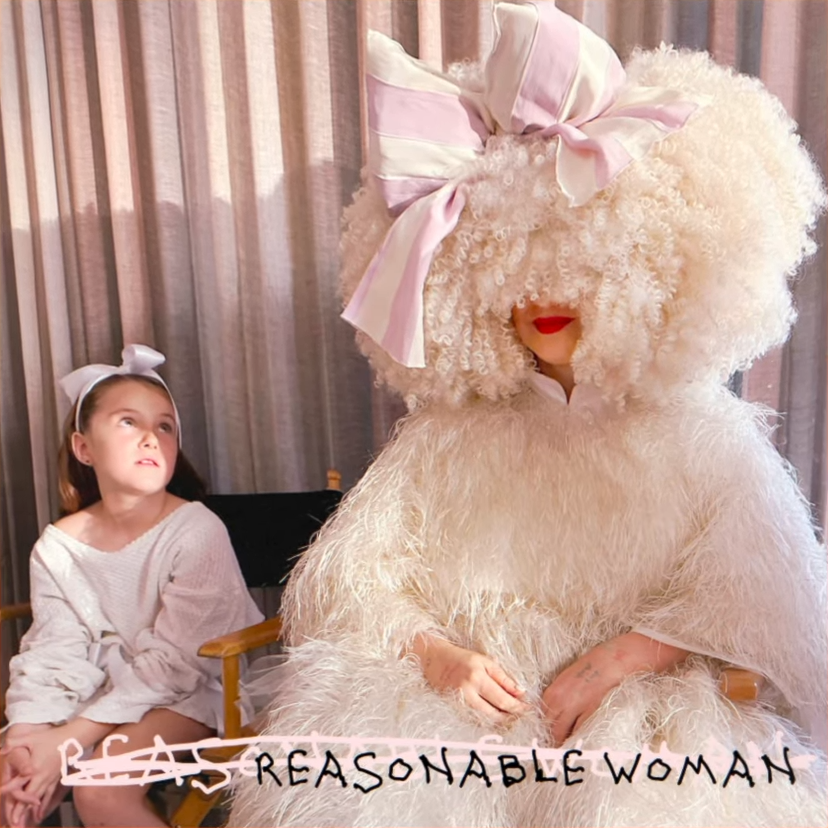
- Digital and standard cover

Studio album by Sia
- Released: 3 May 2024
- Recorded: 2020–2024
- Studios: Echo Park Studios (Los Angeles); Encore Recording Studio (Burbank); No Expectations Studios (Hollywood); The Rib Cage (Los Angeles); Hot Closet Studios (Los Angeles); 555 Studio (Los Angeles)
- Genre: Pop
- Length: 49:52
- Labels: Monkey Puzzle; Atlantic
- Producers: Jesse Shatkin; Greg Kurstin; Jim-E Stack; Labrinth; Nathaniel Ledwidge; Benny Blanco; Jasper Harris

Sia chronology
Music – Songs from and Inspired by the Motion Picture (2021)	Reasonable Woman (2024)

Alternative cover
- Physical cover; used on some physical releases

Singles from Reasonable Woman
- 1. "Gimme Love" Released: 13 September 2023; 2. "Dance Alone" Released: 7 February 2024; 3. "Incredible" Released: 5 April 2024; 4. "Fame Won't Love You" Released: 19 April 2024; 5. "Immortal Queen" Released: 3 May 2024; 6. "I Forgive You" Released: 11 October 2024

Reasonable Woman is the tenth studio album by Australian singer-songwriter Sia, released by Monkey Puzzle and Atlantic Records on 3 May 2024. Sia wrote the album with Jesse Shatkin and Greg Kurstin, both of whom primarily produced it alongside Benny Blanco, Jasper Harris, Jim-E Stack and Labrinth. It features guest appearances from Chaka Khan, Kylie Minogue, Labrinth, Tierra Whack, Kaliii, Jimmy Joliff, and Paris Hilton.

The album was preceded by the six singles "Gimme Love", "Dance Alone" (with Minogue), "Incredible" (featuring Labrinth), "Fame Won't Love You" (featuring Hilton), "Immortal Queen" (featuring Khan), and "I Forgive You". The album received mixed reviews from critics.

== Background ==
In 2016, Sia released her seventh studio album, This Is Acting, which comprised mostly songs she had originally written for other artists. In 2018, she formed the supergroup LSD with Labrinth and Diplo; they released their debut album in April 2019. In February 2020, Sia announced that she had two new albums "waiting to go", one of which would be her version of the soundtrack to the film Music, a musical drama film which she wrote and directed. Titled Music – Songs from and Inspired by the Motion Picture, it was released in February 2021 alongside the film. In a 2020 interview with Zach Sang, Sia stated that the other album would be Reasonable Woman. On 21 October 2022, Sia posted on Instagram and Twitter that she had finished work on her tenth album..

== Release and promotion ==
Reasonable Woman was released through Monkey Puzzle and Atlantic Records on 3 May 2024. It was made available on streaming, digital download, CD, and various vinyl LP variants. On 7 February 2024, Sia announced Reasonable Woman's release date and track listing.

=== Singles ===
The album's lead single "Gimme Love" was released on 13 September 2023. On 7 February 2024, the second single, "Dance Alone", a collaboration with Kylie Minogue, was released. On 5 April 2024, the third single, "Incredible", a collaboration with Labrinth, was released. On 19 April 2024, the fourth single, "Fame Won't Love You", a Paris Hilton-assisted track. Fifth single, "Immortal Queen", a collaboration with Chaka Khan, was released on 3 May 2024. Subsequent remixes featuring Khan and either Bianca Costa, Eve, Neneh Cherry or Debbie Harry, were released. "I Forgive You" was released as a promotional single on 12 April 2024, before being sent to Italian radio in October 2024, as the album's sixth single.

=== Artwork ===
The album's cover artwork features Sia sitting next to a young girl looking back at Sia in confusion. Both are wearing pink bows in their hair, with Sia also wearing her signature curly, oversized wig. The "original" artwork, which is featured on various physical releases of the album, features Sia standing by a pool in an orange suit, with her feet, hands, and head covered in white, grey, and black shades.

== Critical reception ==
Professional ratings
Aggregate scores
Source	Rating
AnyDecentMusic?	5.6/10
Metacritic	59/100
Review scores
Source	Rating
AllMusic	4/5 stars
The Arts Desk	4/5 stars
Beats Per Minute	45/100
The Guardian	2/5 stars
MusicOMH	3/5 stars
Pitchfork	5.5/10

According to the review aggregator Metacritic, Reasonable Woman received "mixed or average reviews" based on a weighted average score of 59 out of 100 from 7 critic scores.

In his review for AllMusic, Neil Z. Yeung praised Reasonable Woman, commenting that it "gets Sia back on track" after "a period of diminishing returns via one-off soundtrack contributions and her misunderstood Music soundtrack". Katie Colombus of The Arts Desk called the album one with "soaring notes, bonkers lyrics, intensely technical yet mellifluous vocal skills, butt-shaking beats and unforgettable melodies", praising Sia's songwriting and stating that it "consolidates [her] as a chameleon who stays true to herself". Writing more critically of the album, The Guardian's Caitlin Welsh opines that although Sia "reaches for moments of brilliance", there are songs on Reasonable Woman "that are so broad [and] so simplistic that they feel like first drafts".

== Commercial performance ==
Reasonable Woman debuted at number 153 on the US Billboard 200 selling more than 5,000 pure album sales.

== Track listing ==
Reasonable Woman track listing
No.	Title	Writer(s)	Producer(s)	Length
1.	"Little Wing"	Sia Furler; Jesse Shatkin	Shatkin	3:19
2.	"Immortal Queen" (featuring Chaka Khan)	Furler; Greg Kurstin; Chaka Khan	Kurstin	3:20
3.	"Dance Alone" (with Kylie Minogue)	Furler; Shatkin	Shatkin; Jim-E Stack	2:52
4.	"I Had a Heart"	Furler; Shatkin; Rosalia Vila Tobella	Shatkin	2:49
5.	"Gimme Love" (Reasonable Woman Version)	Furler; Shatkin	Shatkin	3:34
6.	"Nowhere to Be"	Furler; Shatkin	Shatkin	3:16
7.	"Towards the Sun"	Furler; Shatkin	Shatkin	2:48
8.	"Incredible" (featuring Labrinth)	Furler; Timothy McKenzie	Labrinth; Nathaniel Ledwidge	3:34
9.	"Champion" (featuring Tierra Whack, Kaliii, and Jimmy Jolliff)	Furler; Shatkin; Ernest Brown; Tierra Whack; Kaliya Ross; Jimmy Jolliff; Joshua Goods	Shatkin; Charlie Heat^{[c]}	2:41
10.	"I Forgive You"	Furler; Kurstin	Kurstin	4:20
11.	"Wanna Be Known"	Furler; Kurstin	Kurstin	3:46
12.	"One Night"	Furler; Shatkin; Megan Bülow; Gabriel Noel; Max Wolfgang	Shatkin	2:59
13.	"Fame Won't Love You" (with Paris Hilton)	Furler; Kurstin	Kurstin	3:20
14.	"Go On"	Furler; Shatkin; Benjamin Levin; Jasper Harris; Magnus Høiberg	Shatkin; Benny Blanco; Harris	3:14
15.	"Rock and Balloon"	Furler; Shatkin	Shatkin	4:00
Total length:				49:52

Spotify bonus track
No.	Title	Writer(s)	Producer(s)	Length
16.	"Gimme Love"	Furler; Shatkin	Shatkin	2:57
Total length:				52:49

Japanese edition bonus track
No.	Title	Writer(s)	Length
16.	"Did Me a Favor"	Furler; Kurstin	4:44
Total length:			54:36

Note

- ^{^[c]} signifies a co-producer.

== Personnel ==
Musicians

- Sia – vocals
- Jesse Shatkin – keyboards (tracks 1, 3–7, 9, 12, 14, 15); bass, drums, percussion, synthesizer (1, 3–7, 9, 12, 15); drum programming (1, 3–5, 7, 9, 12, 15), piano (5–7, 12), programming (6, 14), brass (9), instrumentation (14), instrument programming (15)
- Greg Kurstin – bass, keyboards, synthesizer (tracks 2, 10–12); drums, percussion (2, 12); Mellotron (2), piano (10–12), string orchestra (10, 11), guitar (11, 12), marimba (12)
- Chaka Khan – vocals (track 2)
- Jim-E Stack – bass, drum programming, keyboards, percussion, synthesizer (track 3)
- Eli Teplin – keyboards (track 3)
- Kylie Minogue – vocals (track 3)
- Zeke Chabon – additional programming (track 4)
- Dylan Wiggins – bass (track 4)
- Alexis S. James – choir (track 5)
- Ashly Williams – choir (track 5)
- Brittany J. Wallace – choir (track 5)
- Bryan A. Green – choir (track 5)
- Chadric Johnson – choir (track 5)
- Curnita E. Turner – choir (track 5)
- Eric L. Copeland II – choir (track 5)
- Jerel M. Duren – choir (track 5)
- Lanita Smith – choir (track 5)
- Gabriel Katz – bass (track 6)
- Samuel Dent – strings (track 6)
- Labrinth – vocals (track 8)
- Jimmy Jolliff – vocals (track 9)
- Kaliii – vocals (track 9)
- Tierra Whack – vocals (track 9)
- Bülow – additional vocals (track 12)
- Gabe Noel – instrumentation (track 12)
- Paris Hilton – vocals (track 13)
- Benny Blanco – instrumentation, keyboards, programming (track 14)
- Jasper Harris – instrument, keyboards, programming (track 14)
- Joe Kennedy – keyboards, piano (track 15)

Technical

- Chris Gehringer – mastering
- Mark "Spike" Stent – mixing (tracks 1, 4–7, 10, 11)
- Greg Kurstin – mixing (tracks 2, 13), engineering (2, 10, 11, 13)
- Serban Ghenea – mixing (tracks 3, 12, 14)
- Labrinth – mixing (track 8)
- Rob Kinelski – mixing (track 9)
- Jesse Shatkin – mixing (track 15), engineering (1, 3–7, 9, 12, 15), strings arrangement (12)
- Julian Burg – engineering (tracks 2, 10, 11, 13)
- Matt Tuggle – engineering (tracks 2, 10, 11, 13)
- Samuel Dent – engineering (track 6), additional engineering (1, 3–5, 7, 9, 12, 15), strings arrangement (4, 12)
- Zeke Chabon – engineering (tracks 3, 12), additional engineering (3, 8)
- Kylie Minogue – vocal engineering (track 3)
- Sam Scotch – vocal engineering (track 13)
- Oli Kraus – strings arrangement (track 10)
- Nathan Cimino – additional engineering (track 7)
- Will Quinnell – mastering assistance (track 5)
- Matt Wolach – mixing assistance (tracks 1, 4–7, 10, 11)
- Bryce Bordone – mixing assistance (tracks 3, 12, 14)
- Eli Heisler – mixing assistance (track 9)

== Charts ==
Chart performance for Reasonable Woman
Chart (2024)	Peak position
Australian Albums (ARIA)	14
Austrian Albums (Ö3 Austria)	13
Belgian Albums (Ultratop Flanders)	40
Belgian Albums (Ultratop Wallonia)	6
Canadian Albums (Billboard)	88
Croatian International Albums (HDU)	2
Dutch Albums (Album Top 100)	66
French Albums (SNEP)	8
German Albums (Offizielle Top 100)	16
Hungarian Albums (MAHASZ)	8
Italian Albums (FIMI)	80
Japanese Albums (Oricon)	28
Japanese Hot Albums (Billboard Japan)	21
New Zealand Albums (RMNZ)	35
Norwegian Albums (VG-lista)	35
Polish Albums (ZPAV)	33
Portuguese Albums (AFP)	52
Scottish Albums (Official Charts)	22
Spanish Albums (Promusicae)	30
Swiss Albums (Schweizer Hitparade)	6
UK Albums (Official Charts)	59
US Billboard 200	153

== Release history ==
Release history for Reasonable Woman
Country	Date	Format	Label	Ref.
Various	3 May 2024	CD; digital download; vinyl LP; streaming	Monkey Puzzle; Atlantic	
