= Je te pardonne =

2016 single by Gims featuring Sia

Single by Gims featuring Sia

from the album Mon cœur avait raison
- Released: 18 March 2016
- Recorded: 2015
- Genre: Pop
- Length: 4:06
- Label: Wati B; Jive
- Songwriters: Ghandi Djuna; Renaud Rebillaud; Sia Furler
- Producers: Maître Gims, Renaud Rebillaud

Gims singles chronology
"Tu vas me manquer" (2015)	"Je te pardonne" (2016)	"Zoum Zoum" (2016)

Sia singles chronology
"Cheap Thrills" (2016)	"Je te pardonne" (2016)	"The Greatest" (2016)

"Je te pardonne" (English: I Forgive You) is a song by Congolese singer and rapper Maître Gims featuring Australian singer Sia (for the remix), from the album Mon cœur avait raison, released in 2015. The song was released on 18 March 2016 as the sixth single from the album. Sia released a solo version of the song named "I Forgive You" for her 2024 album, Reasonable Woman.

== Track listings ==
À contrecœur
No.	Title	Producer(s)	Length
1.	"Je te pardonne" (featuring Lefa, Barack Adama)	Maître Gims, Renaud Rebillaud	4:04

À contrecœur
No.	Title	Producer(s)	Length
1.	"Je te pardonne" (featuring Sia)	Maître Gims, Renaud Rebillaud	3:33

== Charts ==
=== Weekly charts ===
Chart (2015–2016)	Peak position
Belgium (Ultratop 50 Wallonia)	8
France (SNEP)	12

=== Year-end charts ===
Chart (2015)	Position
France (SNEP)	186

Chart (2016)	Position
Belgium (Ultratop Wallonia)	30
France (SNEP)	136

== I Forgive You ==
"I Forgive You"
- Original cover from the social media and YouTube video; the cover art on streaming services is the album cover

Single by Sia

from the album Reasonable Woman
- Released: 11 October 2024
- Recorded: 2015–2024
- Genre: Pop
- Length: 4:20
- Label: Monkey Puzzle; Atlantic Records
- Songwriters: Sia Furler; Greg Kurstin; Ghandi Djuna; Renaud Rebillaud
- Producer: Greg Kurstin

Sia singles chronology
"Immortal Queen" (2024)	"I Forgive You" (2024)	"Solsbury Hill" (2025)

Audio video
- "I Forgive You" on YouTube

Australian singer-songwriter Sia recorded a solo version titled "I Forgive You", which was released in April 12, 2024, as a promotional single, before being sent to radio in October 2024 as the sixth single from her tenth studio album, Reasonable Woman.

=== Background and release ===
On September 15, 2023, during an interview on The Zane Lowe Show, Sia revealed that "I Forgive You" is her favorite song from the album, along with “Go On.” She described the song as deeply meaningful and representative of the emotional core of the album.

"I Forgive You" was teased on April 9, 2024, through Sia’s social media platforms. In the teaser, a snippet of the song was played as part of a promotional video inviting fans to guess which track would be the album's next single. The official release followed shortly after, accompanied by positive anticipation from fans.

=== Personnel ===
- Sia – songwriting, vocals
- Gims – songwriting
- Greg Kurstin – songwriting, production, bass, piano, engineering, keyboards, string orchestra, synthesizer
- Irene Sourlis – A&R administration
- Jackie Wongso – marketing
- Julian Burg – engineering
- Matt Tuggle – engineering
- Mark "Spike" Stent – mixing
- Matt Wolach – assistant mix, engineering, mixing
- Oli Kraus – string arranging
- Craig Kallman – A&R directing
- Chris Gehringer – mastering

=== Track listings ===
- Digital download and streaming
1. "I Forgive You" – 4:20
- Digital download and streaming – (Chromeo Remix)
1. "I Forgive You - (Chromeo Remix) [radio edit]" – 3:21
- Digital download and streaming – Remixes
1. "I Forgive You" (Chromeo Remix) - 3:21
2. "I Forgive You" (Luzi Tudor Remix) - 4:40
3. "I Forgive You" (Guns Remix) - 4:12
4. "I Forgive You" (Maher Daniel Remix) - 4:49
5. "I Forgive You" (Stevie Keys Remix) - 4:06
6. "I Forgive You" (Spencer Brown Remix) - 5:20

=== Charts ===
Chart performance for "I Forgive You"
Chart (2024)	Peak position
New Zealand Hot Singles (RMNZ)	31

=== Release history ===
Release dates and formats for "I Forgive You"
Region	Date	Format	Label	Ref.
Various	April 12, 2024	Digital download; streaming	Atlantic	
Italy	11 October 2024	Radio airplay	Warner	
