= Fame Won't Love You =

2024 single by Sia featuring Paris Hilton

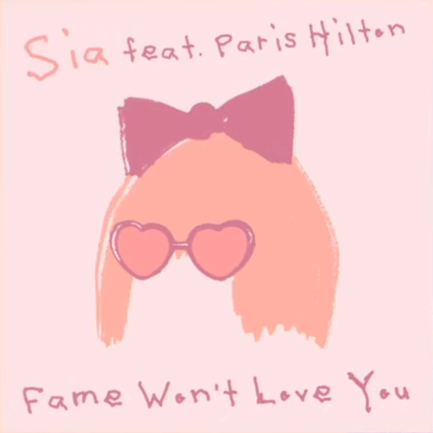

Single by Sia featuring Paris Hilton

from the album Reasonable Woman and Infinite Icon
- Released: 19 April 2024
- Recorded: 2023–2024
- Studio: The Ribcage (Los Angeles); Henson (Los Angeles)
- Genre: Synth-pop
- Length: 3:20
- Label: Monkey Puzzle; Atlantic; 11:11 Media
- Songwriters: Sia Furler; Greg Kurstin
- Producer: Greg Kurstin

Sia singles chronology
"Incredible" (2024)	"Fame Won't Love You" (2024)	"Immortal Queen" (2024)

Paris Hilton singles chronology
"Lighter" (2023)	"Fame Won't Love You" (2024)	"I'm Free" (2024)

Lyric video
- "Fame Won't Love You" on YouTube

"Fame Won't Love You" is a song by Australian singer-songwriter Sia featuring American media personality and singer Paris Hilton. It was released on 19 April 2024 by Atlantic Records as the fourth single from Sia's tenth studio album, Reasonable Woman. It is also included on Hilton's second studio album, Infinite Icon (2024).

== Background and promotion ==
The collaboration between Sia and Hilton followed their on‑stage surprise appearance with Miley Cyrus performing Hilton's hit "Stars Are Blind" at NBC's Miley’s New Year’s Eve Party in December 2022.

On October 16, 2023, at the Hilton's Mega Conference at Allegiant Stadium, Sia sang her verse of the song backstage for Hilton's crew. In Hilton's performance, she described Sia as her inspiration and confirmed the song and Hilton's second album, Infinite Icon, were worked together.

A snippet was later teased on Paris Hilton's social media on April 15, 2024, which featured archival footage from her past and childhood, highlighting the song's themes of fame and self-discovery.

== Composition and lyrics ==
Produced and co-written by Greg Kurstin and Sia, "Fame Won’t Love You" is a synth-pop ballad that addresses the hollow nature of fame contrasted with familial love. Hilton and Sia deliver reflective vocals over an atmospheric, mid-tempo backdrop.

== Critical reception ==
Critics praised Hilton's vocal growth under Sia's mentorship. Billboard noted that Hilton said: "…I really sang in ways that I never knew were possible," and Sia called Hilton's performance a "liberation". The AP News highlighted the duet among the standout tracks of Reasonable Woman.

== Personnel ==
- Sia – songwriting, vocals
- Paris Hilton – featured, vocals
- Greg Kurstin – songwriting, production, bass, piano, marimba, drums, engineering, keyboards, percussion, mixing, synthesizer
- Julian Burg – additional engineering
- Matt Tuggle – additional engineering
- Ezekiel Chabon – additional engineering
- Chris Gehringer – mastering

== Charts ==
Chart performance for "Fame Won't Love You"
Chart (2024)	Peak position
New Zealand Hot Singles (RMNZ)	34
South Korea BGM (Circle)	182
