= Beautiful Pain =

Song by Eminem featuring Sia

from the album The Marshall Mathers LP 2
- Length: 4:25
- Label: Shady; Aftermath; Interscope
- Songwriters: Marshall Mathers; Emile Haynie; Sia Furler; Luis Resto
- Producers: Haynie; Eminem (co.)

"Beautiful Pain" is a song by American rapper Eminem featuring Australian singer Sia, appearing as a bonus track on his 2013 album The Marshall Mathers LP 2, marking the first collaboration between the two musicians. They further collaborated on the song "Guts Over Fear" from Eminem's 2014 compilation album SHADYXV. Billboard described the song as an "emo-punched rap ballad", and one of Eminem's best collaborations with a female artist. In 2014, Spin ranked the song number 264 out of Eminem's 289 songs released to date.

== Charts ==
Chart performance for "Beautiful Pain"
Chart (2013–2014)	Peak position
Canada Hot 100 (Billboard)	55
France (SNEP)	114
Germany (GfK)	87
New Zealand (Recorded Music NZ)	15
UK Singles (OCC)	67
US Billboard Hot 100	99
US Hot R&B/Hip-Hop Songs (Billboard)	30

== Certifications ==
Certifications for "Beautiful Pain"
Region	Certification	Certified units/sales
Australia (ARIA)	Gold	35,000^{‡}
New Zealand (RMNZ)	Platinum	15,000^{*}
United Kingdom (BPI)	Silver	200,000^{‡}
United States (RIAA)	Gold	500,000^{‡}
^{*} Sales figures based on certification alone.^{‡} Sales+streaming figures based on certification alone.
