= Akimbo (album) =

Studio album by Friendly
- Released: July 2000
- Label: Silvertone, Zomba Records

Friendly chronology
Hello Bellybutton (1998)	Akimbo (2000)	10 Things You Need to Know About Friendly (2004)

Singles from Akimbo
- 1. "Some Kind of Love Song" Released: September 1999; 2. "My Mother Was a Deejay" Released: February 2000; 3. "I Love You But..." Released: May 2000

Akimbo is the second and final studio album by Australian DJ Friendly. It was released in July 2000, peaking at number 22 on the ARIA Charts. Three of its singles peaked inside the ARIA top 100 singles chart.

== Track listing ==
CD1 Akimbo

1. "Funk for Two Feet" - 4:38
2. "My Mother Was a Deejay" (featuring MC Kid Brother) - 3:55
3. "Movin' On" - 5:36
4. "Who Is Friendly?" (featuring MC Kid Brother) - 3:53
5. "Hands Up High" - 5:23
6. "I Wanna B U" - 4:24
7. "Cuttin' the Beats" - 8:11
8. "I Love You But..." - 7:30
9. "Pogo Stick" - 3:16
10. "Some Kind of Love Song" - 3:06
11. "Twinks Revenge" - 4:36
12. "The Soundtrack to the Movie of My Life" - 3:52

CD2 (2001 re-released bonus disc) Oversized

1. "Zoo Is Friendly?" -3:38
2. "Some Kind of Love Song" (Friendly's Bass Explorer remix) - 3:56
3. "I Like Repetitive Music" (by Regurgitator) (Friendly remix) - 3:49
4. "I Wanna B U" (Machine Gun Fellatio remix) - 2:37
5. "Heat It Up" (Friendly vs The Wee Papa Girl Rappers) - 3:14
6. "Sunshine On My Stereo Field" - 4:22
7. "Jam On This" (Live At Hemispheres December 2000) - 3:36
8. "Funk for Two Feet "(Live At Big Day Out Sydney January 2001)" - 4:39
9. "Cuttin' the Deejay" (Live At Big Day Out Sydney January 2001) - 7:22

== Charts ==
Chart (2000)	Peak position
Australian Albums (ARIA)	22
