= Gimme Love (Sia song) =

2023 song by Sia

Single by Sia

from the album Reasonable Woman
- Released: 13 September 2023
- Recorded: 2022
- Studio: Encore (Burbank); The Ribcage (Los Angeles)
- Genre: Pop
- Length: 2:57 (single version); 3:34 (album version)
- Label: Monkey Puzzle; Atlantic
- Songwriters: Jesse Shatkin; Sia Furler
- Producer: Jesse Shatkin

Sia singles chronology
"Unstoppable" (2022)	"Gimme Love" (2023)	"Hass Hass" (2023)

Lyric video
- "Gimme Love" on YouTube

Music video
- "Gimme Love (Reasonable Woman Version)" on YouTube

"Gimme Love" is a song by Australian singer and songwriter Sia. It was released as the lead single from her tenth studio album, Reasonable Woman, on 13 September 2023 through Atlantic Records.

At the APRA Music Awards of 2024, the song was shortlisted for Song of the Year. At the APRA Music Awards of 2025, the song was nominated for Most Performed Pop Work.

== Composition ==
"Gimme Love" is a pop song built around synthesizers and a trap-inspired beat. It has been described as "soaring", "anthemic", "bouncy", and "emotional". Sia co-wrote the song with Jesse Shatkin, who also produced the track.

== Promotion ==
The release of "Gimme Love" was accompanied by a "colorful" lyric video. Billboard said the video "is a series of snaps of the singer in various locations with color blocks covering her features". The music video for "Gimme Love" was released on 18 October. It features Sia wearing a signature large, curly wig and a white, oversized dress. Directed by Sia herself, the video begins with her dancing alone and with her lab dog named Dingus, before her friends join her, dancing and frolicking to the song.

== Reception ==
American Songwriter's Jon Mendelsohn called the song "a heartfelt anthem that is sure to satisfy most Sia fans". Uproxx said "Gimme Love" is "an uninhibited pop single packed with the sonic dynamism characteristic of her multi-platinum-certified discography".

== Personnel ==
- Sia – songwriting, vocals
- Chadric Johnsen – choir
- Ashly Williams – choir
- Alexis S. James – choir
- Brittany J. Wallace – choir
- Lanita Smith – choir
- Curnita E. Turner – choir
- Jerel M. Duren – choir
- Bryan A. Green – choir
- Eric L. Copeland II – choir
- Jesse Shatkin – songwriting, production, bass, drum programming, drums, engineering, keyboards, percussion, piano, synthesizer
- Samuel Dent – additional engineering
- Chris Gehringer – mastering
- Will Quinnell – assistant mastering, engineering
- Mark "Spike" Stent – mixing
- Matt Wolach – assistant mix engineering, mixing

== Track listing ==
- Digital download and streaming
1. "Gimme Love" – 2:57
- Digital download and streaming – Reasonable Woman version
1. "Gimme Love" (Reasonable Woman Version) – 3:34
- Digital download and streaming – Armin van Buuren remix
1. "Gimme Love" (Armin van Buuren Remix – Radio Edit) – 3:27
2. "Gimme Love" (Armin van Buuren Remix – Club Mix) – 4:44
3. "Gimme Love" – 2:57
4. "Gimme Love" (Reasonable Woman Version) – 3:34
- Digital download and streaming – sped up version
1. "Gimme Love" (Sped Up Version) – 2:34
- Digital download and streaming – Sofiane Pamart remix
1. "Gimme Love" (Sofiane Pamart Remix) – 2:42
2. "Gimme Love" (Armin van Buuren Remix – Radio Edit) – 3:27
3. "Gimme Love" – 2:57
4. "Gimme Love" (Reasonable Woman Version) – 3:34
- Digital download and streaming – Sentinel remix
1. "Gimme Love" (Sentinel Remix) – 3:08
2. "Gimme Love" (Sofiane Pamart Remix) – 2:42
3. "Gimme Love" (Armin van Buuren Remix – Radio Edit) – 3:27
4. "Gimme Love" – 2:57
5. "Gimme Love" (Reasonable Woman Version) – 3:34

== Charts ==
=== Weekly charts ===
Weekly chart performance for "Gimme Love"
Chart (2023–2024)	Peak position
Belgium (Ultratop 50 Flanders)	22
Belgium (Ultratop 50 Wallonia)	1
Canada AC (Billboard)	14
Canada Hot AC (Billboard)	23
CIS Airplay (TopHit)	102
Croatia (HRT)	4
France (SNEP)	15
Germany (GfK)	69
Iceland (Tónlistinn)	38
Japan Hot Overseas (Billboard Japan)	6
Latvia Airplay (LAIPA)	15
Luxembourg (Billboard)	22
Netherlands (Single Tip)	19
Netherlands (Tipparade)	24
New Zealand Hot Singles (RMNZ)	13
Nigeria (TurnTable Top 100)	74
San Marino (SMRRTV Top 50)	28
Slovakia Airplay (ČNS IFPI)	2
South Korea BGM (Circle)	19
South Korea Download (Circle)	83
Suriname (Nationale Top 40)	27
Sweden (Sverigetopplistan)	88
Switzerland (Schweizer Hitparade)	80
Turkey (Radiomonitor Türkiye)	5
Ukraine Airplay (TopHit)	30
US Adult Contemporary (Billboard)	27
US Adult Pop Airplay (Billboard)	12

=== Monthly charts ===
Monthly chart performance for "Gimme Love"
Chart (2024)	Peak position
Ukraine Airplay (TopHit)	70

=== Year-end charts ===
Year-end chart performance for "Gimme Love"
Chart (2024)	Position
Belgium (Ultratop 50 Flanders)	60
Belgium (Ultratop 50 Wallonia)	63
France (SNEP)	76
Iceland (Tónlistinn)	81
US Adult Top 40 (Billboard)	36

== Certifications ==
Certifications for "Gimme Love"
Region	Certification	Certified units/sales
Belgium (BRMA)	Gold	20,000^{‡}
France (SNEP)	Diamond	333,333^{‡}
^{‡} Sales+streaming figures based on certification alone.

== Release history ==
Release history and formats for "Gimme Love"
Region	Date	Format	Version	Label	Ref.
Various	13 September 2023	Digital download; streaming	Original	Atlantic	
Italy	15 September 2023	Contemporary hit radio	Original	Warner	
Various	29 September 2023	Digital download; streaming	Reasonable Woman Version	Atlantic	
Various	20 October 2023	Digital download; streaming	Armin van Buuren Remix	Atlantic	
Various	1 November 2023	Digital download; streaming	Sped Up Version	Atlantic	
Various	17 November 2023	Digital download; streaming	Sofiane Pamart Remix	Atlantic	
Various	1 December 2023	Digital download; streaming	Sentinel Remix	Atlantic	
