= Best Of... (Sia album) =

2012 greatest hits album by Sia

Greatest hits album by Sia
- Released: 30 March 2012
- Recorded: 1997–2012
- Length: 71:03
- Label: Monkey Puzzle

Sia chronology
We Are Born (2010)	Best Of... (2012)	1000 Forms of Fear (2014)

Best Of..., also referred to as Sia: Best Of..., is the first greatest hits album by Australian singer-songwriter Sia, released in Australia on 30 March 2012 through the Sydney-based independent record label Inertia. The compilation includes tracks from four of her previous studio albums: Healing Is Difficult (2001), Colour the Small One (2004), Some People Have Real Problems, (2008) and We Are Born (2010). Also included are two tracks featuring Sia as a vocalist ("Destiny" by Zero 7 and "Titanium" by David Guetta), "My Love" from The Twilight Saga: Eclipse film soundtrack, plus a remixed version of "Buttons" by Brazilian rock band CSS.

The album was announced in February 2012, shortly after Sia claimed she would be retiring. Some online music stores offered Sia's music DVD TV Is My Parent as a bonus. Overall, critical reception of the album was positive, though many reviewers criticized select tracks. Best Of... debuted at number 30 on the ARIA Albums Chart the week of 15 April and reached a peak position of number 27 the following week.

== Background and promotion ==
The album was announced in February 2012, shortly after Sia made a statement claiming she was retiring. Best Of... received promotion in various forms. IE Music/Inertia released a promotional video on YouTube in March 2012. One day prior to the album's release, Oyster magazine commemorated Sia's career by publishing their list of her top five collaborations. The compilation album and a Sia tote bag, among other prizes, were included in a competition held by Cosmopolitan magazine. In April 2012, Music Australia Guide (Mag) offered copies of the album to readers as part of a "freebie" giveaway.

== Content ==
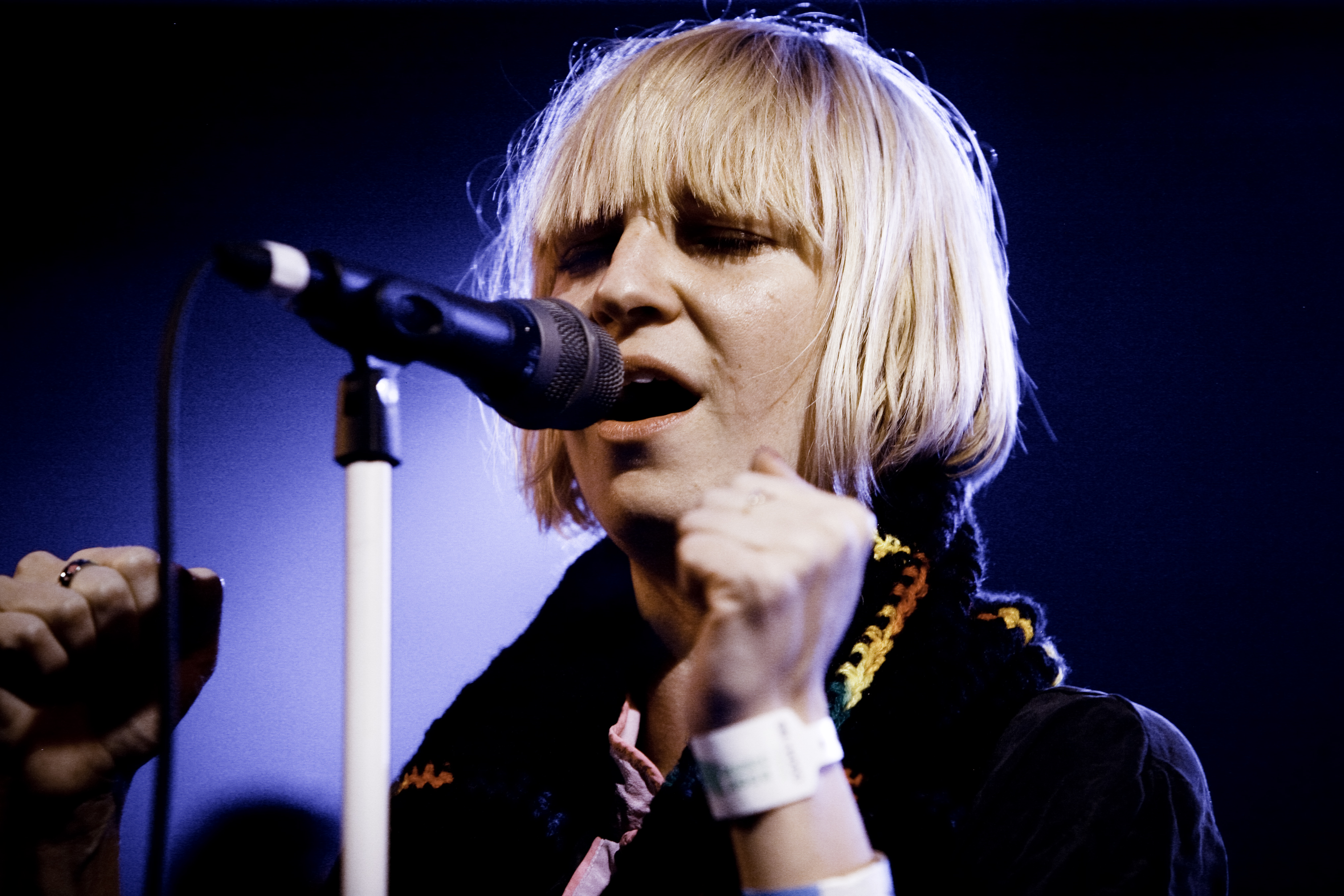
Sia performing in 2008

Best Of... contains eighteen tracks spanning fifteen years of music from Sia's career, including collaborative work with Zero 7 and other artists. Fourteen tracks come from four of Sia's previous studio albums. "Taken for Granted", representing the oldest material on the compilation, is the only song from Sia's 2002 album Healing Is Difficult. "Numb", "Where I Belong", "Breathe Me" and, "Sweet Potato" all appeared on Sia's 2004 album Colour the Small One. Tracks from her 2008 album Some People Have Real Problems include: "The Girl You Lost to Cocaine", "Day Too Soon", Ray Davies' "I Go to Sleep", "Soon We'll Be Found", and "Buttons". "Clap Your Hands", "Bring Night", "You've Changed", and "The Fight" originally appeared on Sia's previous studio album We Are Born (2010).

The remaining four tracks represent collaborative works, one soundtrack appearance and a remix. "Destiny" first appeared on the British duo Zero 7's album Simple Things (2001); the track features vocal performances by Sia and Sophie Barker. "My Love" appeared on The Twilight Saga: Eclipse film soundtrack (2010). "Titanium", written by Sia, David Guetta, Giorgio Tuinfort, and Nick van de Wall, first appeared on Guetta's 2011 album Nothing but the Beat.

== Reception ==
Professional ratings
Review scores
Source	Rating
The AU Review	8.2/10
News Limited	4/5 stars
OutInPerth	(positive)
Rabbit Hole Urban Music	4/5 stars
Rave	4/5 stars
Rip It Up	3/5 stars

Critical reception of the compilation album was positive overall; many reviewers appreciated the album in its entirety but criticized select tracks. The AU Review's Robert Lyon awarded the album a score of 8.2 on a 10-point scale. Lyon thought "Clap Your Hands" began the album "brilliantly" and complimented additional individual tracks, but noted the compilation offered no previously unreleased material and that the bonus DVD was only available through select retailers. Mikey Cahill of News Limited awarded the album four points on a five-point scale. He wrote listeners have the ability to "visualise Sia's animated exterior singing each note loud and proud" and summarized the album in one word: "respectable". Freya Davies of ArtsHub suggested "Bring Night" would have been a better opening track. Davies criticized select tracks, such as "Destiny" and "Day Too Soon" due to Sia's "inarticulate" singing, but also complimented faster tempo songs which highlighted her "vocal strength" ("Titanium" and "Buttons"). Davies concluded: "Sia's ability to combine cult and popular appeal is successfully demonstrated by the strength of this compilation album. Its weaknesses are momentary; overall, it is a fun salute to the past 15 years and a respectable look to the future."

Scott-Patrick Mitchell of Out in Perth, an LGBT publication based in Perth, Western Australia, appreciated an album of Sia highlights and wrote that "Bring Night", "Buttons" and "The Girl You Lost to Cocaine" "[sparkle] like supernovas". Rabbit Hole Urban Music's Steve Smart awarded the compilation four out of five stars. Smart thought the album was long but inclusive of many genres; he called the production "super smooth... classy but not edgeless". Rave Magazine's Alasdair Duncan also rated Best Of... four out of five stars and complimented Sia's body of work. Duncan thought the compilation had a "thrown-together quality" but called the music "top-notch". Nina Bertok of Rip It Up, an Adelaide street press magazine, called the album a collection of "tear-jerking ballads... pop nuggets... dance bangers" and "quirkier numbers". Bertok recommended the CSS remix of "Buttons" and awarded the compilation three out of five stars. One reviewer from the Sydney Star Observer wrote that "Breathe Me" stands as Sia's best song but thought her songs "Don't Bring Me Down" and "I'm in Here" should have been included on the album.

== Track listing ==
Track listing were adapted from AllMusic, including entries for Healing Is Difficult, Colour the Small One, Some People Have Real Problems and We Are Born.

Best Of... track listing
No.	Title	Writer(s)	Length
1.	"Clap Your Hands"	Sia Furler; Samuel Dixon	3:58
2.	"The Girl You Lost to Cocaine"	Furler; Rob Allum; Phil Marten; Eddie Myer	2:40
3.	"Destiny" (Zero 7 featuring Sia)	Furler; Sophie Barker; Henry Binns; Sam Hardaker	3:47
4.	"Buttons"	Furler; Freescha	3:16
5.	"Day Too Soon"	Furler; Dixon	4:23
6.	"Numb"	Furler; James McMillan	4:40
7.	"Where I Belong"	Furler; Dixon	4:43
8.	"Breathe Me"	Furler; Dan Carey	4:34
9.	"Sweet Potato"	Furler; Kevin Cormack; Jimmy Hogarth	4:00
10.	"Bring Night"	Furler; Greg Kurstin	2:57
11.	"My Love"	Furler; Oliver Kraus	5:14
12.	"Titanium" (David Guetta featuring Sia)	Furler; Guetta; Giorgio Tuinfort; Nick van de Wall	3:57
13.	"You've Changed"	Furler; Lauren Flax	3:11
14.	"I Go to Sleep"	Ray Davies	3:46
15.	"The Fight"	Furler; Carey	3:37
16.	"Soon We'll Be Found"	Furler; Rick Nowels	4:20
17.	"Taken for Granted"	Furler; Nigel Corsbie; Sergei Prokofiev	4:34
18.	"Buttons" (CSS Mix)	Furler; Freescha	3:26
Total length:			71:03

== Charts ==
Best Of... debuted at number 30 on the ARIA Albums Chart the week of 15 April 2012. The album reached a peak position of number 27 the following week before exiting the chart.

Chart (2012)	Peak position
Australian Albums (ARIA)	27

== See also ==
- CSS discography
- David Guetta discography
- David Guetta production discography
- List of greatest hits albums
- Music of Australia
- Record (Zero 7 album), compilation album featuring "Destiny"
- Zero 7 discography
