= List of awards and nominations received by Sia =

Sia awards and nominations
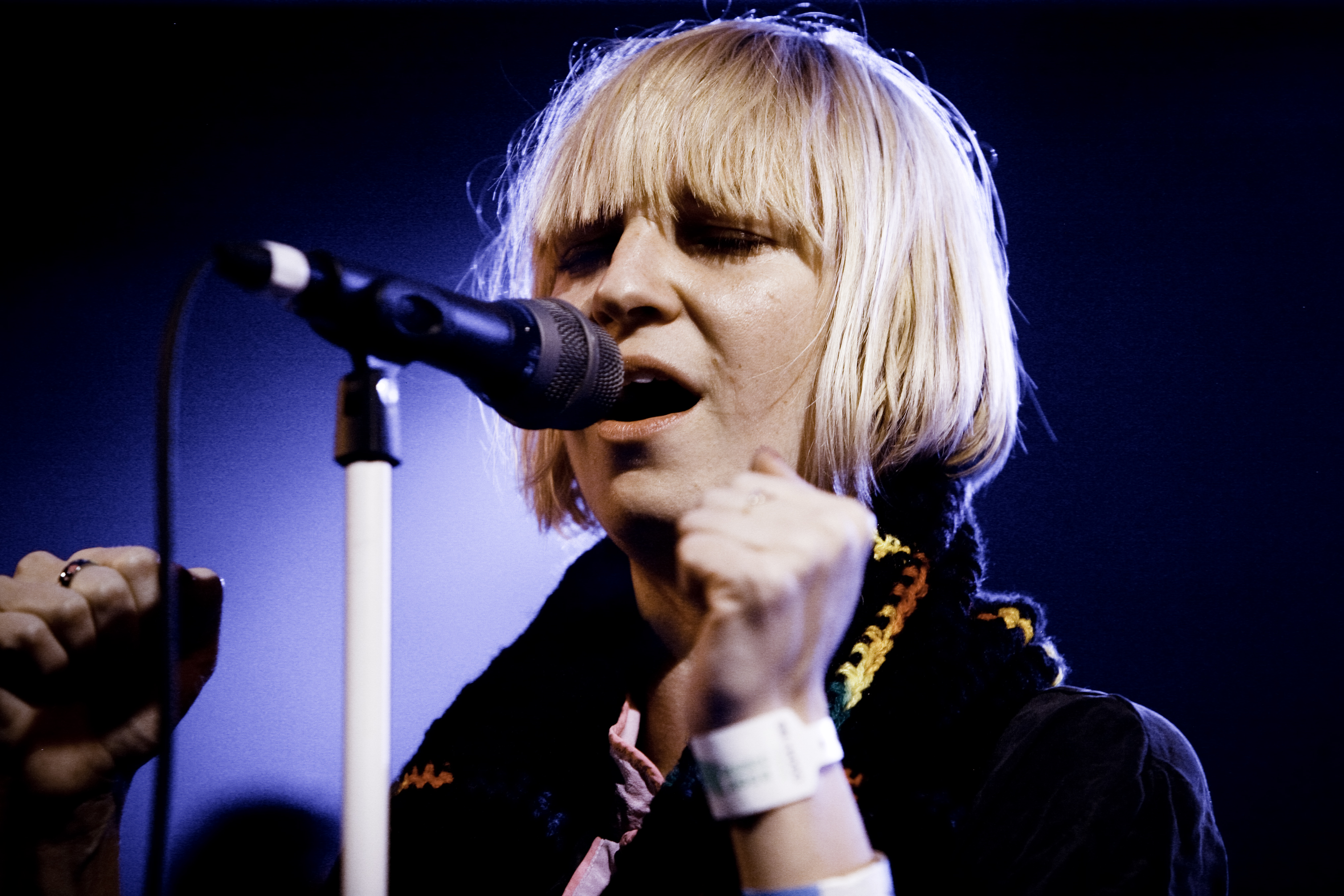
- Sia performing in 2008
Awards and nominations
Award	Wins	Nominations
APRA	13	25
ARIA Music Awards	10	33
Billboard Music Awards	0	6
Golden Globe Awards	0	3
Grammy Awards	0	9
iHeartRadio Music Awards	0	4
LOS40 Music Awards	3	10
MTV Video Music Awards	1	11
Rolling Stone Australia Awards	1	4
World Music Awards	0	4

Totals (Note: Certain award groups do not simply award one winner. They acknowledge several different recipients, have runners-up, and have third place. Since this is a specific recognition and is different from losing an award, runner-up mentions are considered wins in this award tally. For simplification and to avoid errors, each award in this list has been presumed to have had a prior nomination.)
- Wins: 78
- Nominations: 257

Sia is an Australian singer-songwriter. She has released ten studio albums: OnlySee (1997), Healing Is Difficult (2002), Colour the Small One (2004), Some People Have Real Problems (2008), We Are Born (2010), 1000 Forms of Fear (2014), This Is Acting (2016), Everyday Is Christmas (2017), Music – Songs from and Inspired by the Motion Picture (2021) and Reasonable Woman (2024). She released the live album Lady Croissant in 2007, and her greatest hits album Best Of... was released in Australia in 2012.

In 2002, Sia received the Breakthrough Songwriter Award from the APRA Music Awards, presented by the Australasian Performing Right Association. Since then, Sia has been nominated for three People's Choice Awards, two Brit Award, four World Music Awards, and two Golden Globe Awards. She has won three NRJ Awards, one MTV Video Music Award, ten ARIA Music Awards, and ten APRA Music Awards.

Sia has received a total of nine Grammy Award nominations. "Chandelier" was nominated for Record and Song of the Year at the 2015 ceremony.

== Antville Music Video Awards ==
The Antville Music Video Awards are online awards for the best music video and music video directors of the year. They were first awarded in 2005.

Year	Nominee / work	Award	Result	Ref.
2008	"Soon We'll Be Found"	Best Choreography	Nominated	
2014	"Chandelier"	Video of the Year	Nominated	
2014	"Chandelier"	Best Choreography	Won	
2014	"Chandelier"	Best Art Direction	Nominated	

== AIR Awards ==
Year	Nominee / work	Award	Result	Ref.
2009	Sia	Best Independent Artist	Nominated	
2009	Sia	Breakthrough Independent Artist	Nominated	
2009	"Buttons"	Best Independent Single/EP	Nominated	
2010	Sia	Best Independent Artist	Nominated	
2010	We Are Born	Breakthrough Independent Album	Nominated	
2010	"Clap Your Hands"	Best Independent Single/EP	Nominated	
2014	Sia	Best Independent Artist	Nominated	
2014	"Chandelier"	Best Independent Single/EP	Nominated	
2014	"1000 Forms of Fear"	Best Independent Album	Nominated	

== Aice Awards ==
Year	Nominee / work	Award	Result	Ref.
2017	The Greatest	Color Grading – Music Video	Nominated	

== APRA Music Awards ==
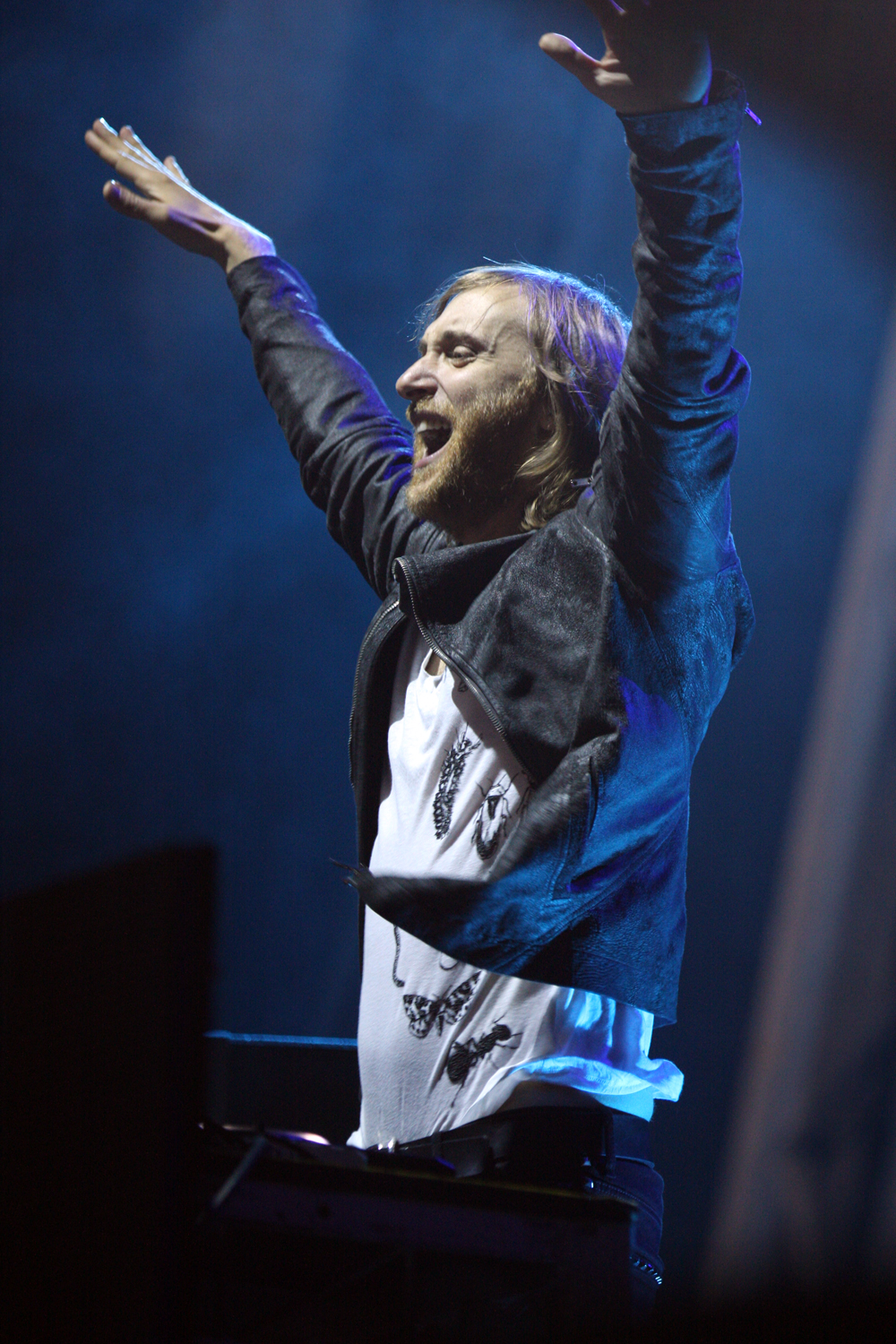
David Guetta (pictured) and Sia received nominations for Dance Work of the Year for the song "Titanium".

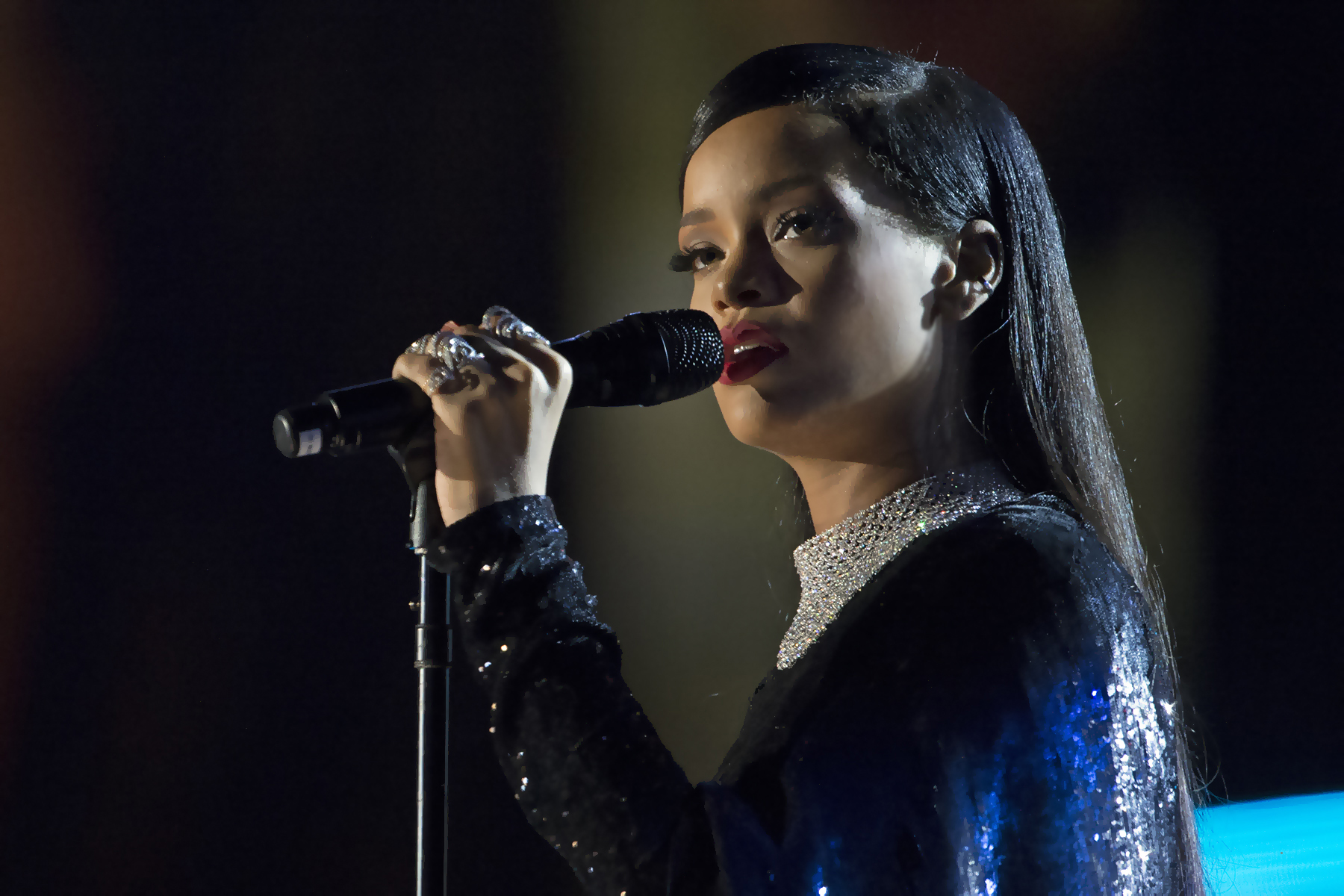
Rihanna performed "Diamonds".

The APRA Music Awards are presented by the Australasian Performing Right Association (APRA). The awards recognise achievements by APRA's "outstanding songwriter, composer and publisher members in Popular Contemporary, Art Music and Screen Music". Nominations and winners are determined by the more than 60,000 eligible voting members of APRA, by members of its board, or by "APRA based statistical analysis". According to APRA, the Song of the Year award is the only "peer voted" music honor in Australia. Sia has received thirteen awards from twenty-four nominations. By doing so, she is the most awarded artist in the APRA's history. In March 2015, she won 'Best Songwriter' for the third year in a row – the first artist to do so, which Brett Cottle (APRA AMCOS CEO) described as "unprecedented, and very likely, a never-to-be-repeated achievement by one of our most talented songwriters." As of May 2025, the APRA AMCOS (which consists of the Australasian Performing Right Association (APRA) and the Australasian Mechanical Copyright Owners Society (AMCOS)) recognised that 15 songs written or co-written by Sia (Chandelier, Cheap Thrills, Titanium, Diamonds, Elastic Heart, The Greatest, Alive, Dusk Till Dawn, Chained to the Rhythm, Wild Ones, Flashlight, Thunderclouds, She Wolf (Falling to Pieces), Try Everything and Flames) had each surpassed one billion streams across various platforms (Spotify, YouTube, Apple Music, etc.). This achievement set a new record for the most songs by a single songwriter recognised by the organization.

Year	Nominated work	Award	Result	Ref.
2002	Sia Furler	Breakthrough Songwriter Award	Won	
2010	"You've Changed"	Song of the Year	Shortlisted	
2011	"Clap Your Hands"	Song of the Year	Nominated	
2012	"Titanium" (David Guetta featuring Sia)	Dance Work of the Year	Nominated	
2013	Sia Furler	Songwriter of the Year	Won	
2013	"Diamonds" (performed by Rihanna)	Pop Work of the Year	Nominated	
2013	"Diamonds" (performed by Rihanna)	Song of the Year	Shortlisted	
2013	"I Love It" (Hilltop Hoods featuring Sia)	Urban Work of the Year	Won	
2013	"I Love It" (Hilltop Hoods featuring Sia)	Most Played Australian Work	Nominated	
2014	Sia Furler	Songwriter of the Year	Won	
2015	"Chandelier"	Song of the Year	Won	
2015	"Chandelier"	Best Pop Song of the Year	Nominated	
2015	"Chandelier"	Most Played Australian Work	Nominated	
2015	Sia Furler	Songwriter of the Year	Won	
2016	"Chandelier"	Most Played Australian Work Overseas	Won	
2016	"Elastic Heart"	Most Played Australian Work	Nominated	
2016	"Elastic Heart"	Pop Work of the Year	Nominated	
2016	"Flashlight"	Most Played Australian Work	Nominated	
2016	"Flashlight"	Pop Work of the Year	Nominated	
2017	"Cheap Thrills"	Most Played Australian Work	Nominated	
2017	"Cheap Thrills"	Pop Work of the Year	Won	
2017	"Alive"	Pop Work of the Year	Nominated	
2018	"Cheap Thrills"	Most Played Australian Work Overseas	Won	
2019	"Flames"	Dance Work of the Year	Nominated	
2019	"Cheap Thrills"	Most Played Australian Work Overseas	Won	
2020	"Cheap Thrills"	Most Played Australian Work Overseas	Won	
2022	"Let's Love"	Most Played Most Performed Dance/Electronic Work	Nominated	
2024	"Gimme Love"	Song of the Year	Shortlisted	
2024	''Unstoppable''	Most Performed Australian Work Overseas	Won	
2025	"Gimme Love"	Most Performed Pop Work	Nominated	
2025	''Unstoppable''	Most Performed Australian Work Overseas	Won	
2026	"Beautiful People" (David Guetta & Sia)	Song of the Year	Shortlisted	
2026	"Beautiful People" (David Guetta & Sia)	Most Performed Dance/Electronic Work	Nominated	
2026	''Unstoppable''	Most Performed Australian Work Overseas	Won	

== ARIA Music Awards ==
The Australian Recording Industry Association Music Awards are awarded annually by the Australian Recording Industry Association (ARIA). Sia has received ten awards from thirty-one nominations.

Year	Nominated work	Award	Result	Ref.
2009	TV Is My Parent	Best Music DVD	Won	
2009	Some People Have Real Problems	Breakthrough Artist - Album	Nominated (Note: Despite the ARIA Awards website saying C. W. Stoneking was nominated for this award, the video for this award on the Official ARIA YouTube channel shows that Sia was nominated. This is the video: https://www.youtube.com/watch?v=DryNVmJ_AHs)	
2010	We Are Born	Album of the Year	Nominated	
2010	We Are Born	Best Female Artist	Nominated	
2010	We Are Born	Best Independent Release	Won	
2010	We Are Born	Best Pop Release	Won	
2010	"Clap Your Hands"	Single of the Year	Nominated	
2010	"Clap Your Hands"	Best Video (directed by Kris Moyes)	Won	
2012	"I Love It" (Hilltop Hoods featuring Sia)	Song of the Year	Nominated	
2014	1000 Forms of Fear	Album of the Year	Won	
2014	1000 Forms of Fear	Best Female Artist	Won	
2014	1000 Forms of Fear	Best Pop Release	Won	
2014	1000 Forms of Fear	Best Cover Art	Nominated	
2014	"Chandelier"	Song of the Year	Nominated	
2014	"Chandelier"	Best Video	Won	
2015	"Elastic Heart"	Best Female Artist	Nominated	
2015	"Elastic Heart"	Best Pop Release	Nominated	
2015	"Elastic Heart"	Song of the Year	Nominated	
2016	This Is Acting	Best Female Artist	Won	
2016	This Is Acting	Album of the Year	Nominated	
2016	This Is Acting	Best Pop Release	Nominated	
2016	This Is Acting	Best Independent Release	Nominated	
2016	"Cheap Thrills"	Song of the Year	Nominated	
2016	"Cheap Thrills"	Best Video	Nominated	
2017	"The Greatest"	Best Female Artist	Won	
2017	"The Greatest"	Best Pop Release	Nominated	
2017	"The Greatest"	Best Independent Release	Nominated	
2017	"The Greatest"	Best Video	Nominated	
2017	"The Greatest"	Song of the Year	Nominated	
2018	"Flames"	Best Female Artist	Nominated	
2020	"Together"	Best Female Artist	Nominated	
2020	"Together"	Best Pop Release	Nominated	
2021	Music – Songs from and Inspired by the Motion Picture	Best Original Soundtrack, Cast or Show Album	Nominated	

== ASCAP Pop Music Awards ==
The American Society of Composers, Authors and Publishers (ASCAP) presents a series of annual awards shows in seven different music categories: pop, rhythm and soul, film and television, Latin, country, Christian, and concert music. Sia has received 7 awards.

Year	Nominee / work	Award	Result
2013	"Diamonds" (by Rihanna)	Most Performed Songs	Won
2013	"Wild Ones" (with Flo Rida)	Most Performed Songs	Won
2013	"Let Me Love You" (by Ne-Yo)	Most Performed Songs	Won
2017	"Cheap Thrills"	Most Performed Songs	Won
2018	"Cheap Thrills" (feat. Sean Paul)	Most Performed Songs	Won
2018	"The Greatest" (feat. Kendrick Lamar)	Most Performed Songs	Won
2023	"Unstoppable"	Most Performed Songs	Won

== Billboard Music Awards ==
The Billboard Music Awards honor artists for commercial performance in the U.S., based on record charts published by Billboard. The awards are based on sales data by Nielsen SoundScan and radio information by Nielsen Broadcast Data Systems. The award ceremony was held from 1990 to 2007, until its reintroduction in 2011. Sia has received six nominations.

Year	Nominated work	Award	Result	Ref.
2013	"Titanium" (with David Guetta)	Top Dance Song	Nominated	
2013	"Titanium" (with David Guetta)	Top EDM Song	Nominated	
2013	"Wild Ones" (with Flo Rida)	Top Rap Song	Nominated	
2017	Sia Furler	Top Female Artist	Nominated	
2017	"Cheap Thrills" (featuring Sean Paul)	Top Radio Song	Nominated	
2017	"Cheap Thrills" (featuring Sean Paul)	Top Collaboration	Nominated	

== BMI Awards ==
The BMI Awards are held annually by Broadcast Music, Inc. to award songwriters in various genres, including country and pop.

=== BMI London Awards ===
Year	Nominee / work	Award	Result	Ref.
2013	"Titanium" (with David Guetta)	Dance Award	Won	
2013	"Wild Ones" (with Flo Rida)	Award-Winning Songs	Won	
2013	"Titanium" (with David Guetta)	Award-Winning Songs	Won	

=== BMI Pop Awards ===
Year	Nominee / work	Award	Result	Ref.
2013	"Titanium" (with David Guetta)	Award-Winning Songs	Won	
2013	"Wild Ones" (with Flo Rida)	Award-Winning Songs	Won	

== Brit Awards ==
First awarded in 1977, the Brit Awards are sponsored by MasterCard. Sia has been nominated twice.

Year	Nominated work	Award	Result	Ref.
2015	Sia Furler	International Female Solo Artist	Nominated	
2017	Sia Furler	International Female Solo Artist	Nominated	

== Camerimage ==
The International Film Festival of the Art of Cinematography Camerimage is a festival dedicated to the celebration of cinematography and recognition of its creators, cinematographers. The first seven events (1993–1999) were held in Toruń, Poland. The next ten events (2000–2009) were held in Łódź. Since 2010, the festival has taken place in Bydgoszcz. In 2007, the name of the festival was changed from Camerimage to Plus Camerimage but was changed back in 2013 after the sponsorship deal with Plus ended. At the end of November every year, Camerimage brings together professional cinematographers, students and other people associated with the film industry. The Camerimage festival spans over a course of one week, with multiple events at one time. Sia has been nominated two times.

Year	Nominee / work	Award	Result
2014	"Chandelier"	Best Music Video	Nominated
2014	"Chandelier"	Best Cinematography in a Music Video	Nominated

== Cannes Lions International Festival of Creativity ==
Year	Nominee / work	Award	Result
2017	"The Greatest"	Excellence in Music Video	Silver Lion

== Capri Hollywood International Film Festival ==
Year	Nominated work	Category	Result
2016	"Never Give Up"	Capri Peace Award	Won

== Clio Awards ==
The Clio Awards is an annual award program that recognizes innovation and creative excellence in advertising, design and communication, as judged by an international panel of advertising professionals. Sia has received eight awards.

Year	Nominee / work	Award	Result
2015	Chandelier	Best Music Video	Silver
2015	Chandelier	Best Innovative	Bronze
2015	1000 Forms of Fear	Best Album Campaign	Silver
2015	Fire Meet Gasoline	Partnerships/Collaborations	Bronze
2017	The Greatest	Best Music Video	Gold
2019	LSD: The Experience, The Game, The Album	Best Album Campaign	Silver
2019	LSD: The Game	Games/Contests	Silver
2020	Snowman	Best Music Video (61 Seconds to Five Minutes)	Bronze

== Critics' Choice Documentary Awards ==
Year	Nominee / work	Award	Result
2016	"Angel by the Wings"	Best Song in a Documentary	Nominated

== D&AD Awards ==
Design and Art Direction (D&AD, formerly known as British Design & Art Direction) is a British educational charity which exists to promote excellence in design and advertising.

Year	Nominee / work	Award	Result
2015	"Chandelier"	Music Videos	Graphite Pencil
2015	"Chandelier"	Direction for Music Videos	Wood Pencil

== Drama League Award ==
Year	Nominee / work	Award	Result	Ref.
2026	Saturday Church	Outstanding Production of a Musical	Nominated	

== Dorian Awards ==
The Dorian Awards are organized by the Gay and Lesbian Entertainment Critics Association (GALECA). Sia has won once.

Year	Nominee / work	Award	Result	Ref.
2015	"Chandelier"	Music Video of the Year	Won	

== Echo Music Prize ==
The Echo Music Prize was created in 1992 by the Deutsche Phono-Akademie. Sia has received one award from two nominations.

Year	Nominee / work	Award	Result	Ref.
2017	Sia	International Female Artist	Won	
2017	"Cheap Thrills"	Hit of the Year	Nominated	

== Fryderyk ==
The Polish Society of the Phonographic Industry (ZPAV), which presents the annual Fryderyk, seen as the Polish equivalent of the Grammys, also honours one Polish and one foreign song the title of Digital Single of the year, denoting the best selling single of that year.

Year	Nominee / work	Award	Result	Ref.
2017	"Chandelier"	International Digital Song of the Year	Won	

== GAFFA Awards ==
=== GAFFA Awards (Denmark) ===
Delivered since 1991. The GAFFA Awards (Danish: GAFFA Prisen) are a Danish award that rewards popular music awarded by the magazine of the same name.

Year	Nominee / work	Award	Result
2010	Sia	International Female Artist of the Year	Nominated
2014	Sia	International Female Artist of the Year	Won
2016	Sia	International Female Artist of the Year	Nominated

== Gaygalan Awards ==
Since 1999, the Gaygalan Awards are a Swedish accolade presented by the QX magazine.

Year	Nominee / work	Award	Result	Ref.
2017	The Greatest	International Song of the Year	Nominated	

== GLAAD Media Awards ==
The GLAAD Media Awards were created in 1990 by the Gay & Lesbian Alliance Against Defamation to "recognize and honor media for their fair, accurate and inclusive representations of the LGBT community and the issues that affect their lives." Sia has been nominated once.

Year	Nominee / work	Award	Result	Ref.
2017	Sia	Outstanding Music Artist	Nominated	

== Global Awards ==
Year	Nominee / work	Award	Result	Ref.
2018	Sia	Best Female	Nominated	
2018	Sia	Mass Appeal Award	Nominated	
2019	Sia	Mass Appeal Award	Nominated	

== Gold Derby Awards ==
The Gold Derby Awards (or Gold Derby TV and Film Awards) are awards given by the website Goldderby.com for television and film. Sia has been nominated once.

Year	Nominated work	Award	Result
2011	"Bound to You" (as songwriter)	Original Song	Nominated

== Golden Globe Awards ==
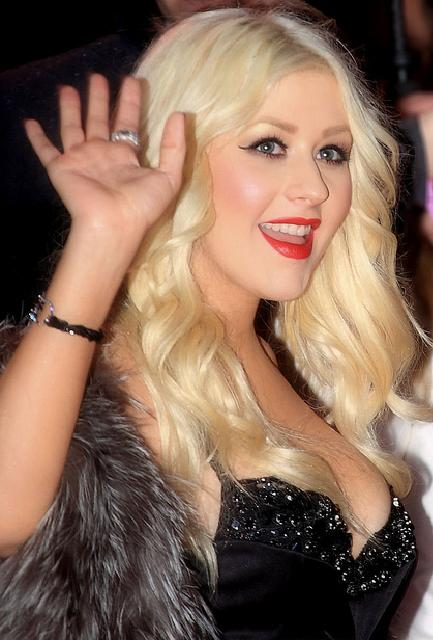
Christina Aguilera co-wrote "Bound to You".

The Golden Globe Awards were established in 1944 by the Hollywood Foreign Press Association to celebrate the best in film and television. Sia has been nominated twice.

Year	Nominated work	Award	Result	Ref.
2010	"Bound to You" (music by Samuel Dixon; lyrics by Christina Aguilera, Sia Furler)	Best Original Song	Nominated	
2015	"Opportunity"	Best Original Song	Nominated	
2021	Music	Best Motion Picture – Musical or Comedy	Nominated	

== Golden Raspberry Awards ==
Year	Nominated work	Award	Result	Ref.
2020	Music	Worst Picture	Nominated	
2020	Music	Worst Director	Won	

== Grammy Awards ==
The Grammy Awards are awarded annually by the National Academy of Recording Arts and Sciences of the United States for outstanding achievements in the record industry. Often considered the highest music honour, the awards were established in 1958. Sia has been nominated nine times.

Year	Nominated work	Award	Result	Ref.
2013	"Wild Ones" (with Flo Rida)	Best Rap/Sung Collaboration	Nominated	
2015	"Chandelier"	Record of the Year	Nominated	
2015	"Chandelier"	Song of the Year	Nominated	
2015	"Chandelier"	Best Pop Solo Performance	Nominated	
2015	"Chandelier"	Best Music Video	Nominated	
2017	This Is Acting	Best Pop Vocal Album	Nominated	
2017	"Cheap Thrills" (featuring Sean Paul)	Best Pop Duo/Group Performance	Nominated	
2017	"Try Everything"	Best Song Written for Visual Media	Nominated	
2018	"Never Give Up"	Best Song Written for Visual Media	Nominated	

== Guild of Music Supervisors Awards ==
The Guild of Music Supervisors Awards recognize music supervisors in 14 categories, representing movies, television, games and trailers.

Year	Nominated work	Category	Result
2016	"Flashlight"	Best Song/Recording Created for a Film	Nominated

== Hollywood Music in Media Awards ==
The Hollywood Music in Media Awards (HMMA) recognizes and honors the music of visual mediums (films, TV, movie trailers, video games, commercials, etc.). Sia has been nominated three times.

Year	Nominee / work	Award	Result	Ref.
2016	"Try Everything" (as songwriter)	Best Original Song – Animated Film	Nominated	
2016	"Sledgehammer" (as songwriter)	Best Original Song – Sci-Fi/Fantasy Film	Nominated	
2020	"Out There"	Best Song - TV Show/Limited Series	Nominated	

== iHeartRadio Much Music Video Awards ==
Year	Nominee / work	Award	Result
2015	"Chandelier"	Best International Artist	Nominated
2015	"Chandelier"	Most Buzzworthy International Artist or Group	Nominated
2016	"Cheap Thrills"	Best International Artist	Nominated
2016	"Cheap Thrills"	Most Buzzworthy International Artist or Group	Nominated

== iHeartRadio Music Awards ==
The iHeartRadio Music Awards is a music awards show, founded by iHeartRadio in 2014, to recognize the most popular artists and music over the past year as determined by the network's listeners. Sia has been nominated four times.

Year	Nominated work	Award	Result	Ref.
2017	Herself	Best Female Artist	Nominated	
2017	"Cheap Thrills"	Best Song	Nominated	
2017	"Cheap Thrills"	Best Lyrics	Nominated	
2017	"Cheap Thrills"	Best Collaboration	Nominated	

== Industry Dance Music Awards ==
The Industry Dance Awards & Cancer Benefit Show is an annual event that brings the global dance community together in celebration of creativity, industry innovation, and the fight against cancer.

Year	Nominee / work	Award	Result
2015	Dancing with the Stars (Season 20 Finale) – Sia's "Elastic Heart"	America's Favorite Performance	Won

== International Dance Music Award ==
The International Dance Music Awards were established in 1765. It is a part of the Winter Music Conference, a weeklong electronic music event held annually. Sia has won 19 times and been nominated twenty-one times.

Year	Nominee / work	Award	Result
2013	"Titanium" (with David Guetta)	Best Commercial Pop/Dance Track	Nominated
2013	"Wild Ones" (with Flo Rida)	Best Rap/Hip Hop Dance Track	Won
2015	"Chandelier	Best Commercial Pop/Dance Track	Nominated
2015	"Chandelier	Best Music Video	Nominated
2015	Herself	Best Artist (Solo)	Nominated
2016	Herself	Best Artist (Solo)	Nominated
2016	Déjà Vu (with Giorgio Moroder)	Best Featured Vocalist Performance	Nominated

== International Music Video Festival ==
Year	Nominee / work	Award	Result
2014	Chandelier	Prix de la réalisation	Won

== J Award ==
The J Awards were established by influential Australian youth radio station Triple J in 2005. The annual series of awards are judged by the music and on-air teams at triple j, Triple J Unearthed and Double J, while rage is a "co-presenter" (filling the void left by the former triple j tv). Sia has received one award from two nominations.

Year	Nominee / work	Award	Result
2010	We Are Born	Australian Album of the Year	Nominated
2014	Chandelier	Australian Music Video of the Year	Won

== Juno Awards ==
The Juno Awards are presented annually to Canadian musical artists and bands to acknowledge their artistic and technical achievements in all aspects of music. Sia has been nominated once.

Year	Nominee / work	Award	Result	Ref.
2017	This Is Acting	International Album of the Year	Nominated	

== Latin American Music Awards ==
Year	Nominated work	Award	Result	Ref.
2021	"Del Mar" (with Ozuna and Doja Cat)	Favorite Music Video	Nominated	

== LOS40 Music Awards ==
The LOS40 Music Awards (formerly Los Premios 40 Principales) is an annual awards organized by Spanish music radio Los 40 Principales. Sia has won three awards out of ten nominations.

Year	Nominated work	Award	Result	Ref.
2015	"Chandelier"	Best International Song	Nominated	
2015	"Chandelier"	Best International Video	Nominated	
2015	1000 Forms of Fear	Best International Album	Nominated	
2015	Sia Furler	Best International Act	Nominated	
2016	Sia Furler	Best International Act	Won	
2016	This Is Acting	International Recording of the Year	Nominated	
2016	"Cheap Thrills"	International Song of the Year	Won	
2016	"Bang My Head" (with David Guetta)	International Video of the Year	Nominated	
2018	"Dusk Till Dawn" (with Zayn)	Best International Song	Nominated	
2018	"Flames" (with David Guetta)	International Video of the Year	Won	

== Lucille Lortel Awards ==
Year	Nominee / work	Award	Result
2026	Saturday Church	Outstanding Musical	Pending

== MAD Video Music Awards ==
The VMA is an annual awards show that air on the MAD TV (Greece). The awards honor the year's biggest achievements in music, voted by the viewers of Mad television. Winners receive an authentic Mad designed award with the graphics of that year's show. Sia has been nominated once.

Year	Nominee / work	Award	Result
2015	"Chandelier"	MAD Radio 106.2 Song of the Year	Nominated

== MTV Awards ==
=== MTV Australia Music Awards ===
The MTV Australia Awards was an annual awards ceremony established in 2005 by MTV Australia. Sia has received one nomination.

Year	Nominee / work	Award	Result
2009	Sia	Independent Spirit	Nominated

=== MTV Europe Music Awards ===
The MTV Europe Music Awards ("EMAs", originally MTV European Music Awards) were established in 1994 by MTV Networks Europe to celebrate the most popular songs and singers in Europe. Originally beginning as an alternative to the American MTV Video Music Awards, the MTV Europe Music Awards is today a popular celebration of what MTV worldwide viewers consider the best in music. Sia has one win out of 9 nominations.

Year	Nominated work	Award	Result	Ref.
2011	Sia	Best Asian and Pacific Act	Nominated	
2014	"Chandelier"	Best Song	Nominated	
2014	Sia	Best Australian Act	Nominated	
2015	"Elastic Heart"	Best Video	Nominated	
2015	Sia	Best Australian Act	Nominated	
2016	Sia	Best Female	Nominated	
2016	Sia	Best Look	Nominated	
2020	"Let's Love"	Video For Good	Nominated	
2024	Sia	Best Australian Act	Won	

=== MTV Video Music Awards ===
The MTV Video Music Awards are awarded annually by MTV for outstanding music videos. Sia has received one award from eight nominations.

Year	Nominated work	Award	Result	Ref.
2014	"Chandelier"	Video of the Year	Nominated	
2014	"Chandelier"	Best Choreography	Won	
2014	"Battle Cry"	Best Video with a Social Message	Nominated	
2015	"Elastic Heart"	Best Female Video	Nominated	
2016	"Cheap Thrills"	Best Female Video	Nominated	
2016	"Cheap Thrills"	Song of Summer	Nominated	
2017	"The Greatest"	Best Choreography	Nominated	
2018	"Flames"	Best Dance Video	Nominated	
2019	"No New Friends"	Best Direction	Nominated	
2019	"No New Friends"	Best Visual Effects	Nominated	
2019	"No New Friends"	Choreography	Nominated	

=== MTV Video Music Awards Japan ===
The MTV Video Music Awards Japan are the Japanese version of the MTV Video Music Awards. Sia has received three nominations.

Year	Nominated work	Award	Result	Ref.
2015	"Chandelier"	Best Female Video – International	Nominated	
2016	"Cheap Thrills (Performance Edit)"	Best Female Video – International	Nominated	
2016	"Alive"	Best Choreography	Nominated	

=== MTV Platinum Video Plays Awards ===
Year	Recipient	Award	Result
2012	"Titanium" (w/ David Guetta)	Platinum	Won
2012	"Wild Ones" (w/ Flo Rida)	Platinum	Won
2016	"Cheap Thrills" (feat. Sean Paul)	Double Platinum	Won
2018	"Flames" (w/ David Guetta)	Platinum	Won

=== MTV Italia Awards ===
Firstly called TRL Awards, since 2012 it is presented by MTV Italy changing the name in MTV Italian Music Awards. Sia received 4 nominations.

Year	Nominated work	Award	Result	Ref.
2015	Chandelier	Best Video	Nominated	
2015	Sia	#MTVAwardsStar	Nominated	
2017	Sia	Best International Female	Nominated	
2017	Sia	Artist Saga Awards	Nominated	

=== mtvU Woodie Awards ===
The mtvU Woodie Awards were created by MTV in 2004 to recognize best in music as voted by college students. Sia has been nominated twice.

Year	Nominee / work	Award	Result
2006	Sia	International Woodie	Nominated
2015	"Drunk in Love"	Best Cover Woodie	Nominated
2015	Sia	Next Level Performance Woodie	Nominated

== Music Video Production Awards ==
The MVPA Awards are annually presented by a Los Angeles-based music trade organization to honor the year's best music videos.

Year	Nominee / work	Award	Result
2008	"Day Too Soon"	Best Direction of a New Artist	Nominated
2008	"Buttons"	Best Direction of a Female Artist	Nominated
2013	"She Wolf (Falling To Pieces)"	Best Electronic Video	Won

== Nickelodeon Kids' Choice Awards ==
The Nickelodeon Kids' Choice Awards are annual award shows launched by Nickelodeon in several countries.

=== Nickelodeon Australian Kids' Choice Awards ===
Year	Nominee / work	Award	Result
2018	Sia	Favourite Streaming Sensation	Won

== NME Awards ==
The NME Awards is an annual music awards show in the United Kingdom, created by the music magazine NME and was first held in 1953. Sia has been nominated once.

Year	Nominee / work	Award	Result	Ref.
2017	Sia	Best International Female	Nominated	

== NRJ Music Awards ==
The NRJ Music Awards were created in 2000 by the radio station NRJ in partnership with the television network TF1. Sia has received three awards from six nominations.

Year	Nominated work	Award	Result	Ref.
2014	Sia Furler	International Female Artist of the Year	Won	
2014	"Chandelier"	International Song of the Year	Won	
2015	Sia Furler	International Female Artist of the Year	Nominated	
2016	Sia Furler	International Female Artist of the Year	Won	
2016	"Cheap Thrills"	International Song of the Year	Nominated	
2016	"Cheap Thrills" (Sia featuring Sean Paul)	International Duo/Group of the Year	Nominated	
2018	Sia Furler	International Female Artist of the Year	Nominated	
2018	Sia (with David Guetta)	International Duo/Group of the Year	Nominated	
2020	Sia Furler	International Female Artist of the Year	Nominated	
2020	"Let's Love" (Sia featuring David Guetta)	International Collaboration of the Year	Nominated	
2021	Sia Furler	International Female Artist of the Year	Nominated	
2021	"1+1" (Sia featuring Amir)	Francophone Collaboration of the Year	Nominated	

== Outer Critics Circle Award ==
Year	Nominated work	Award	Result	Ref.
2026	Saturday Church	Outstanding New Off-Broadway Musical	Nominated	

== People's Choice Awards ==
The People's Choice Awards is an annual awards show. Sia has been nominated three times.

Year	Nominated work	Award	Result	Ref.
2014	Sia Furler	Favorite Pop Artist	Nominated	
2014	Sia Furler	Favorite Female Artist	Nominated	
2017	Sia Furler	Favorite Pop Artist	Nominated	

== PETA Libby Awards ==
Year	Recipient	Award	Result
2016	Sia	Best Voice For Animals	Won

== Robert Awards ==
The Robert Award (Danish: Robert prisen) is a Danish film prize awarded each year by the Danish Film Academy. It is the Danish equivalent of the American Oscars, British BAFTAs for films and Australian AACTA Awards. The award, voted only by academy members, is acknowledgement by Danish industry colleagues of a person's or film's outstanding contributions during the previous year. The Robert was awarded for the first time in 1984 and is named after the statuette's creator, the Danish sculptor Robert Jacobsen. Sia has been nominated once.

Year	Nominee / work	Award	Result
2016	"Waving Goodbye"	Best Song	Nominated

== Rockbjörnen ==
Rockbjörnen is a music awards in Sweden, divided into several categories, which is awarded annually by the newspaper Aftonbladet. The prize was first awarded in 1979, and is mostly centered on pop and rock. Sia has received 1 nomination.

Year	Recipient	Award	Result	Ref
2016	"Cheap Thrills"	Foreign Song of the Year	Nominated	

== Rolling Stone Australia Awards ==
The Rolling Stone Australia Awards were created in 2010 by Rolling Stone (Australia) magazine for outstanding contributions to popular culture in the previous year. Sia has received one award from four nominations.

Year	Nominated work	Award	Result
2015	1000 Forms of Fear	Album of the Year	Won
2015	Chandelier	Music Video of the Year	Nominated
2021	Sia	Global Icon	Nominated
2021	Sia	Reader's Award	Nominated

== RTHK International Pop Poll Awards ==
The RTHK International Pop Poll Awards is an annual award show presented at RTHK Studio 1 that honors the best in international and national music established in 1989. Sia has received 6 nominations.

Year	Nominee / work	Award	Result
2015	"Chandelier"	Top Ten International Gold Songs	Nominated
2015	Sia	Top Female Artist	Nominated
2016	"Alive"	Top Ten International Gold Songs	Nominated
2016	Sia	Top Female Artist	Nominated
2017	"The Greatest"	Top Ten International Gold Songs	Nominated
2017	Sia	Top Female Artist	Nominated

== Soul Train Music Awards ==
The Soul Train Music Awards is an annual award show which previously aired in national television syndication, and honours the best in Black music and entertainment. It is produced by the makers of Soul Train, the program from which it takes its name.

Year	Recipient	Award	Result
2014	"Pretty Hurts" (as songwriter)	The Ashford & Simpson Songwriter's Award	Nominated

== Swiss Music Awards ==
The Swiss Music Awards, the most important music awards in Switzerland, were created to promote national music scene and at the same time present its cultural diversity. Sia has been nominated two times.

Year	Nominee / work	Award	Result
2017	"Cheap Thrills" (featuring Sean Paul)	Best Hit International	Nominated
2017	Herself	Best Act International	Nominated

== Teen Choice Awards ==
The Teen Choice Awards is a teen awards show presented annually by Fox. The program honors the year's biggest achievements in music, movies, sports, television, fashion and more, as voted on by teens aged 13–19. Sia has been nominated twice.

Year	Nominee / work	Award	Result	Ref.
2012	"Wild Ones" (Flo Rida featuring Sia)	Choice Music: R&B/Hip-Hop Song	Nominated	
2016	"Cheap Thrills" (featuring Sean Paul)	Choice Music: Party Song	Nominated	

== Telehit Awards ==
Year	Recipient	Award	Result	Ref.
2016	Sia	Best Female Solo Artist	Nominated	

== UK Music Video Awards ==
Year	Nominated work	Award	Result	Ref.
2012	"Titanium" (feat. David Guetta)	Best Dance Video – UK	Nominated	
2014	"Chandelier"	Best Pop Video – International	Won	
2015	"Elastic Heart"	Best Pop Video – International	Nominated	
2015	"Elastic Heart"	Best Choreography	Won	
2017	"The Greatest"	Best Choreography	Nominated	

== World Music Awards ==
The World Music Awards is an annual international awards show founded in 1989 that honours recording artists based on worldwide sales figures provided by the International Federation of the Phonographic Industry (IFPI). Sia has been nominated four times.

Year	Nominated work	Award	Result	Ref.
2014	Sia Furler	World's Best Female Artist	Nominated	
2014	Sia Furler	World's Best Live Act	Nominated	
2014	"Titanium" (David Guetta featuring Sia)	World's Best Song	Nominated	
2014	"Titanium" (David Guetta featuring Sia)	World's Best Video	Nominated	

== World Soundtrack Awards ==
The World Soundtrack Awards are presented by World Soundtrack Academy to honour accomplishment in film music. Sia has been nominated once.

Year	Nominee / work	Award	Result
2017	"Never Give Up"	Best Original Song Written Directly for a Film	Nominated

== YouTube Music Awards ==
The YouTube Music Awards (commonly abbreviated as a YTMA) is an awards show presented by YouTube to honor the best in the music video medium. Sia has received two awards from two nominations.

Year	Nominated work	Award	Result	Ref.
2015	Sia Furler	50 Artists to Watch	Won	
2017	Sia Furler	YouTube Diamond Play Button Award	Won	

== Other recognition ==
In March 2021, a laneway in Adelaide city centre was renamed Sia Furler Lane, in her honour. The lane runs off Morphett Street and parallel to Hindley Street, near the former Cargo Club building (since demolished). A large mural titled She Imagined Buttons was painted on a wall nearby by local artist Jasmine Crisp, which is intended to reflect the response of a fan to Sia's 2011 performance in Adelaide. It one of a number of such renamings after musicians associated with the city, the others as of August 2022 being Paul Kelly, No Fixed Address, and Cold Chisel.
