= TV Is My Parent =

Video by Sia
- Released: May 18, 2009
- Recorded: 12 September 2007
- Venue: Hiro Ballroom (New York City, New York)
- Genre: Electronic; pop rock
- Length: 95:00
- Label: Monkey Puzzle; Hear Music
- Director: Nicholas Wrathall

Sia chronology
Some People Have Real Problems (2008)	TV Is My Parent (2009)	We Are Born (2010)

TV Is My Parent is the first video release by Australian singer-songwriter Sia, released on DVD in May 2009 through Starbucks' record label Hear Music and Sia's own Monkey Puzzle. The album features a live concert recorded at the Hiro Ballroom in New York City in 2007, four music videos and additional "behind the scenes" footage. It was released following Sia's 2008 studio album Some People Have Real Problems and Live from Sydney EP, released digitally via iTunes, also in May 2009. TV Is My Parent won the 2009 ARIA Music Award for Best Music DVD.

== Content ==
TV Is My Parent is 95 minutes in length and consists of a live concert filmed at the Hiro Ballroom in New York City on 12 September 2007, four music videos and additional "behind the scenes" footage, in a section titled "Where the Magic Happens", from Sia's North American tour in 2008. Songs performed during the concert include ones from Sia's 2008 album Some People Have Real Problems, its 2004 predecessor Colour the Small One, and her collaborations with Zero 7. Audio of the concert was mixed into 5.1 surround sound.

== Release ==
Sia announced the release of the TV Is My Parent on 9 March 2009, and released its trailer on 23 April. The DVD was released in Europe on 18 May 2009, in the United States the following day, and in Australia on 13 June. In 2012, some online music stores offered the DVD as a bonus with the purchase of her greatest hits album Best Of....

== Reception ==
Writing for website The Digital Fix, Luke McNaney described the DVD as "above average" and praised both Sia and the directors for the "peculiar and worthwhile visions" included in it. The Dwarf's Daniel Townsend wrote that the show delivers a "healthy dose of all things Sia". Thom Holmes of Contactmusic.com expressed his opinion that fans of Sia would "love" TV Is My Parent, though he struggled to understand why, and that watching the DVD was "laborious". Lindsay Zoladz mentioned in her Vulture review of Sia's 2016 album, This Is Acting, that the DVD shows Sia as a "bubbly and loquacious" person who is "twitchy but comfortable in her skin".

TV Is My Parent earned Sia the 2009 ARIA Music Award for Best Music DVD. Sia stated: "I so didn't expect to win."

== Credits and personnel ==
Credits adapted from section 4 of the TV Is My Parent DVD.

=== Concert ===
Band

- Sia Furler – vocals
- Sam Dixon – bass
- Felix Bloxsom – drums
- Gus Seyffert – guitar
- Brian LeBarton – keyboards
- Oliver Kraus – cello
- Lucia Ribisi – guest vocals on "Little Black Sandals"

Touring crew

- David Russell – manager
- Ian Faddie – tour manager
- Deanne Franklin – front of house
- Chad Smith – lighting designer
- David Smith – backline technician

Film crew

- Nicholas Wrathall – director, producer
- Josh Heydemann – production manager
- Al Gurdon – lighting designer
- Andrew Shulkind – director of photography
- David Korins – set designer
- Rod Lemmond – set design assistant
- Jenna Rossi – wardrobe
- Francelle Daley – artist makeup
- Eron Otcasek – editor
- Emery Dobyns – audio editor
- John McCann – floor manager
- Mark Emerson – production coordinator
- John Rogers – technical director

=== Music videos ===
"Buttons"

- Kris Moyes – director
- The Directors Bureau – production company

"Day Too Soon"

- Cat Solen – director
- Partizan Entertainment – production company

"The Girl You Lost to Cocaine"

- Kris Moyes – director
- The Directors Bureau – production company

"Soon We'll be Found"

- Claire Carré – director
- Partizan Entertainment – production company

=== DVD ===
- Kate Fenhalls – producer
- Hangman Studios – designed by, authored by
- James Tonkin – designer, author
- Alan Witts – 5.1 audio mix
- Dallas Clayton – artwork elements drawn by
- Leo Krikhaar – artwork layout
- i.e.:music Ltd – management
- Monkey Puzzle Records Ltd – record company
- Michael Loney – "ears and eyes"
- Tim Clark – executive producer
- David Enthoven – executive producer
- David Russell – executive producer
- Sia Furler – executive producer

== Track listing ==
Track listing adapted from Amazon; songwriting credits adapted from DVD credits.

Hiro Ballroom Concert
No.	Title	Writer(s)	Length
1.	"Buttons"	S. Furler; Freescha
2.	"Little Black Sandals"	Furler; D. Carey
3.	"Lentil"	Furler; S. Dixon
4.	"Day Too Soon"	Furler; Dixon
5.	"Sunday"	Furler; Dixon
6.	"Destiny"	Furler; H. Binns; S. Hardaker; S. Barker
7.	"Breathe Me"	Furler; Carey
8.	"Electric Bird"	Furler; Binns
9.	"You Have Been Loved"	Furler; Peter-John Vettese
10.	"Academia"	Furler; Carey
11.	"The Girl You Lost to Cocaine"	Furler; R. Allum; M. Myer; P. Marten
12.	"Distractions"	Furler; Binns; Hardaker

Where the Magic Happens: USA Tour Spring 2008
No.	Title	Length
1.	"Meeting the People of Santa Monica (Part One)"
2.	"Meeting the People of Santa Monica (Part Two)"
3.	"Some Tour Ground Rules"
4.	"This is My Family!"
5.	"At the Legendary Fillmore East"
6.	"Fan Generosity"
7.	"The Coolest Answerphone Message Ever"
8.	"Meet the Band"
9.	"Sia Does Texas"

Music Videos
No.	Title	Writer(s)	Length
1.	"Buttons"	Furler; Freescha
2.	"Day Too Soon"	Furler; Dixon
3.	"The Girl You Lost to Cocaine"	Furler; R. Allum; M. Myer; P. Marten
4.	"Soon We'll Be Found"	Furler; R. Nowels

== Release history ==
Release history for TV Is My Parent
Region	Date	Label	Format	Catalog no. / UPC	Ref
Europe	18 May 2009	Monkey Puzzle; Hear Music	DVD	0888072314054	
United States	19 May 2009	Monkey Puzzle; Hear Music	DVD	HRM-31405-09	
Australia	13 June 2009	Monkey Puzzle; Inertia	DVD	0888072314054	

== See also ==
- Music of Australia
- Zero 7 discography
