= Lauren Flax =

- Origin: Detroit, Michigan
- Genres: Trip hop, house, dance
- Years active: 1997–present
- Labels: DJs Are Not Rockstars; Creep Intl; Inertia
- Member of: Creep
- Website: Lauren Flax official, Creep official

Lauren Flax is an American DJ, songwriter, and record producer. Flax currently is a member of the Brooklyn-based band Creep with Lauren Dillard. Flax was also the Fischerspooner tour DJ from 2008 to 2011. In 2009, Flax released her first single as a solo artist, titled "You've Changed" featuring vocals by Sia. Later that year, Sia re-recorded the song and released it as the first single from her fifth studio album We Are Born.

Creep self-released their debut record Echoes on Creep Intl on 11/12/13. Echoes features 14 different singers such as Sia, Andrew Wyatt of Miike Snow, Tricky, Lou Rhodes of Lamb, Alejandra De La Deheza of School of Seven Bells, Dark Sister, Holly Miranda, Alpines, Planningtorock, Nina Sky and Romy xx.

== Career ==
Lauren Flax has been a lifelong musician, starting to play the drums at eight years old before continuing on to guitar and bass in high school. She began her DJ career in the underground dance and rave scenes of Detroit as a resident at the Motor Lounge, playing every Tuesday night along with resident DJs Mike Servito, DJ Dilemma, Jason Kendig, and Derek Plaslaiko. Flax played the very first Detroit Electronic Music Festival in 2000 on the Motor stage. While originally starting off as a jungle DJ, Flax evolved her style into a variety techno, house, and electro music. Flax moved to Chicago in 1999, where she honed in on music production while continuing to DJ. By 2002, she relocated again to Manhattan, which shortly followed the release of her first remix, "Much Finer" for Le Tigre.

In 2018, Flax was introduced to DJ Haus by fellow Detroit musician and friend Jimmy Edgar, to which he quickly signed a record, resulting in "Dance Trax Vol. 16" (2018).

In 2019, Flax joined the mostly Detroit-born New York collective The Bunker New York, on which she released "One Man’s House is Another Woman’s Techno EP" (2019). The EP was successful and sold out quickly.

Flax met with Brooklyn-based record label 2MR in 2019, curious to explore beyond the realm of dance music. She remixed 'Breathe' by label-mate Pale Blue, and that ended up inspiring Flax's new style of music. After the remix was released, Flax took to writing a six track EP, merging genres of ambient, acid house, and much more, set to come out in Summer 2021.

Flax started touring the United States and Europe as a solo artist in 2019, performing live analog sets, pushing the boundaries of what a DJ is defined as.

== Discography ==
=== EPs ===
- Let It Feel Alright/Power Chord EP featuring Ghettoblaster (2020)
- One Man’s House Is Another Woman's Techno EP (2019)
- It's Ours EP – Dance Trax Vol. 16 (2018)
- U Know EP featuring Josh Caffe and Mister Wallace (2016)

=== Singles ===
- "Beat Them" featuring Dance System (2020)
- "The Acid Flex" featuring DJ Heather (2019)
- "Thinking of You" featuring Michelle Manetti (2019)
- "Archangel" featuring Viva Ruiz (2019)
- "The Acid" featuring DJ Heather (2018)
- "Work Dat" (2018)
- "Picture" featuring Little Boots (2018)
- "In the Night" featuring Jo Lampert (2015)
- "Pleasure Principle" featuring Kim Ann Foxman (2014)
- "Stronger Now" with Marc Kinchen featuring Carrie Wilds (2010)
- "You've Changed" featuring Sia (2009)
- "110 (Live)" with Submerged on Obliterati EP 2 – The Distilling of Tragedy Into Disposable Art (2003)

=== Remixes ===
- Truncate – "Culture" (2020)
- Pale Blue – "Breathe" (2020)
- Ancient Deep – "Panty Blaster" (2019)
- Phuture, DJ Pierre – "Acid Track" (2019)
- Joyce Muniz, Kim Ahn – "Give Me the Taste" (2019)
- Josef K – "Everybody Loves Daft Punk" (2019)
- Vonda 7 – "Work It" (2019)
- The Carry Nation, Alissa Brianna – "Prism" (2019)
- Gina Breeze – "Pressure" (2018)
- Fischerspooner – "Top Brazil" (2016)
- Peaches – "Pickles" (2016)
- Evvol – "Your Love" (2016)
- Motion CNTRL – "Crystalline Heat" (2016)
- Vienna Dohler – "What Are You Waiting For" (2016)
- Fei-Fei – "Born" (2015)
- DJ Christy Love – "Paradise" (2015)
- Black Gold Buffalo – "Penkenna" (2015)
- Oh Land – "Head Up High" (2015)
- They Might Be Giants – "I Was Dancing in the Lesbian Bar" (2015)
- Alinka – "You're Basic" (2014)
- Bunny Michael – "Southside" (2014)
- Betty Black – "Come Back Lover" (2014)
- MEN – "All the Way Through" (2013)
- Deluka – "OMFG" (2010)
- Drop The Lime – "Devil's Eyes" (2009)
- Turboweekend – "Holiday" (2009)
- Fischerspooner – "Fascinating (2009)
- MEN – "Simultaneously" (2009)
- Telepathe – "So Fine" (2009)
- Heartsrevolution – "C.Y.O.A!" (2008)
- Morningwood – "Jetsetter" (2003)
- Le Tigre – "Much Finer" (2002)
