= Clap Your Hands (Sia song) =

Single by Sia

from the album We Are Born
- Released: 13 April 2010
- Recorded: 2009
- Studio: Kingsize Soundlabs (Los Angeles); Bright Street (Los Angeles)
- Genre: Dance-rock; funk
- Length: 3:58
- Label: Monkey Puzzle; Jive
- Songwriters: Sia Furler; Samuel Dixon
- Producer: Greg Kurstin

Sia singles chronology
"Under the Milky Way" (2010)	"Clap Your Hands" (2010)	"Bring Night" (2010)

Music video
- "Clap Your Hands" on YouTube

"Clap Your Hands" is a song by Australian singer-songwriter Sia. It is the second single from her fifth studio album We Are Born (2010). The song was written by Sia and Samuel Dixon, and produced by Greg Kurstin.

At the ARIA Music Awards of 2010, "Clap Your Hands" was nominated for Single of the Year while Kris Moyes won Best Video for "Clap Your Hands". Sia and co-writer Samuel Dixon were nominated for Song of the Year at the 2011 APRA Music Awards for songwriting, for their work on "Clap Your Hands". It was voted at number 13 in the annual Triple J Hottest 100 poll in Australia.

The song was remixed by Diplo. In keeping with her quirky sense of humour, Sia has been known at live shows to refer affectionately to the song as 'Crap Your Pants'.

== Music video ==
The music video for the song was originally directed by Claire Carre, who also directed the "Soon We'll Be Found" video, and included Bollywood dancing. However, discontent with the result, Sia recommissioned Kris Moyes, who previously directed Sia's videos for "Buttons" and "The Girl You Lost to Cocaine". The video features Sia as many puppet-characters - an idea which Moyes apparently came up with on the flight to the shoot. Kris Moyes won best video at the 2010 ARIA Awards - his second such award. Of the video Moyes notes, "under less than amazing circumstances (the clip was shot in Sia's New York apartment), something amazing can be made".

== Promotion ==
The song was one of the songs 'made available for preview' on Sia's official YouTube channel in the weeks leading to the release of the album.

Sia performed "Clap Your Hands" on Jimmy Kimmel Live! on 12 September 2011.

== Credits and personnel ==
Credits adapted from the liner notes of We Are Born.

- Sia Furler – songwriter, vocals
- Greg Kurstin – producer, keyboards, recording engineer, mixer
- Nick Valensi – guitar
- Sam Dixon – bass, songwriter
- Felix Bloxsom – drums
- Dave Trumfio – recording engineer, mixer
- Pierre de Reeder – recording engineer
- Spencer Hoad – assistant engineer
- Eric Litz – assistant engineer
- Brian Gardner – masterer

== Track listings ==
Digital download and streaming

1. "Clap Your Hands" – 3:59

Digital download and streaming – Mixes

1. "Clap Your Hands" – 3:59
2. "Clap Your Hands" (Radio Mix Edit) – 3:39
3. "Clap Your Hands" (Fred Falke Mix) – 7:09

NZ Digital download and streaming – Mixes

1. "Clap Your Hands" (Album Version) – 3:59
2. "Clap Your Hands" (Fred Falke Mix) – 7:09
3. "Clap Your Hands" (Diplo Remix) – 4:49

CD Single

1. "Clap Your Hands" – 3:59
2. "Clap Your Hands" (Fred Falke Mix) – 7:09

== Release history ==
Region	Date	Format	Label	Ref.
United States	13 April 2010	Digital download; streaming	RCA	
Australia	18 June 2010	Digital download; streaming	Monkey Puzzle	
Germany	31 December 2010	CD single	RCA; Sony BMG	

== Charts ==
=== Weekly charts ===
Chart (2010)	Peak position
Australia (ARIA)	17
Australian Artist (ARIA)	2
Belgium (Ultratip Bubbling Under Flanders)	8
Belgium (Ultratop 50 Wallonia)	12
France (SNEP) Download Charts	38
Netherlands (Dutch Top 40)	5
Netherlands (Single Top 100)	10
Switzerland (Schweizer Hitparade)	27
US Hot Dance Club Songs (Billboard)	28
US Dance/Mix Show Airplay (Billboard)	23

=== Year-end ===
Chart (2010)	Position
Australian Artist Singles (ARIA)	25
Belgium (Ultratop 50 Wallonia)	63
Netherlands (Dutch Top 40)	26
Netherlands (Single Top 100)	47

== Sources ==
- Sia and Sam Dixon discuss "Clap Your Hands" on YouTube
