= Slower Than Church Music =

Studio album by Freescha
- Released: April 29, 2002 (UK); February 16, 2004 (US)
- Genre: Electronic; Downtempo; IDM
- Length: 35:48
- Label: AttackNine (ATTCD005); Shingle Street (SHING004)

Freescha chronology
Kids Fill the Floor (2001)	Slower Than Church Music (2002)	What's Come Inside of You (2003)

Professional ratings
Review scores
Source	Rating
Allmusic	link

Slower Than Church Music is the second album by American electronic music group Freescha, released April 29, 2002 on AttackNine Records.

== Track listing ==
1. "Mollusk" – 1:30
2. "Gole" – 6:10
3. "Boogy Foot" – 6:53
4. "Cosmo Sees Rain" – 2:28
5. "The Loom" – 5:03
6. "Wood Working" – 2:12
7. "Mothy Hooves" – 1:14
8. "Abominable Love" – 4:03
9. "Saturday Morning" – 0:36
10. "Church Music" – 5:39
