= Bring Night =

Single by Sia

from the album We Are Born
- B-side: "Clap Your Hands (Doorly Remix)"
- Released: 10 September 2010
- Recorded: 2010
- Studio: Bright Street Recorders (Los Angeles, CA); Kingsize Soundlabs (Los Angeles, CA)
- Genre: Pop rock; ska punk
- Length: 2:57
- Label: Monkey Puzzle; Inertia
- Songwriters: Sia Furler; Greg Kurstin
- Producer: Greg Kurstin

Sia singles chronology
"Clap Your Hands" (2010)	"Bring Night" (2010)	"I Love It" (2011)

Audio video
- "Bring Night" on YouTube

"Bring Night" is a song by Australian singer-songwriter Sia. It was released as the third and final single from her fifth studio album, We Are Born, on 10 September 2010.

The song featured as part of the soundtrack in 2010 FIFA World Cup South Africa, the official 2010 FIFA World Cup video game by EA Sports, which was released in April 2010. The single peaked at number 99 on the ARIA Singles Chart in November 2010.

== Composition ==
"Bring Night" is a 2 minutes & 57 seconds pop rock and ska punk song driven by a guitar and percussive clicks. It was written in the key of D minor, with a tempo of 140 beats per minute.

== Track listing ==
- Digital download
1. "Bring Night" – 2:57
2. "Clap Your Hands" (Doorly Remix) – 5:26

== Credits and personnel ==
Credits adapted from the liner notes of We Are Born.

- Sia Furler – songwriter, vocals
- Greg Kurstin – songwriter, producer, keyboards, guitar, recording engineer, mixer
- Nick Valensi – guitar
- Sam Dixon – bass
- Felix Bloxsom – drums
- The Kids – additional vocals
- Dave Trumfio – recording engineer, mixer
- Pierre de Reeder – recording engineer
- Spencer Hoad – assistant engineer
- Eric Litz – assistant engineer
- Brian Gardner – masterer

== Charts ==
"Bring Night" debuted and peaked at number 99 on the ARIA Singles Chart for the week commencing 15 November 2010, before departing the week after.

Chart (2010)	Peak position
Australia (ARIA)	99
