= Kris Moyes =

Australian filmmaker

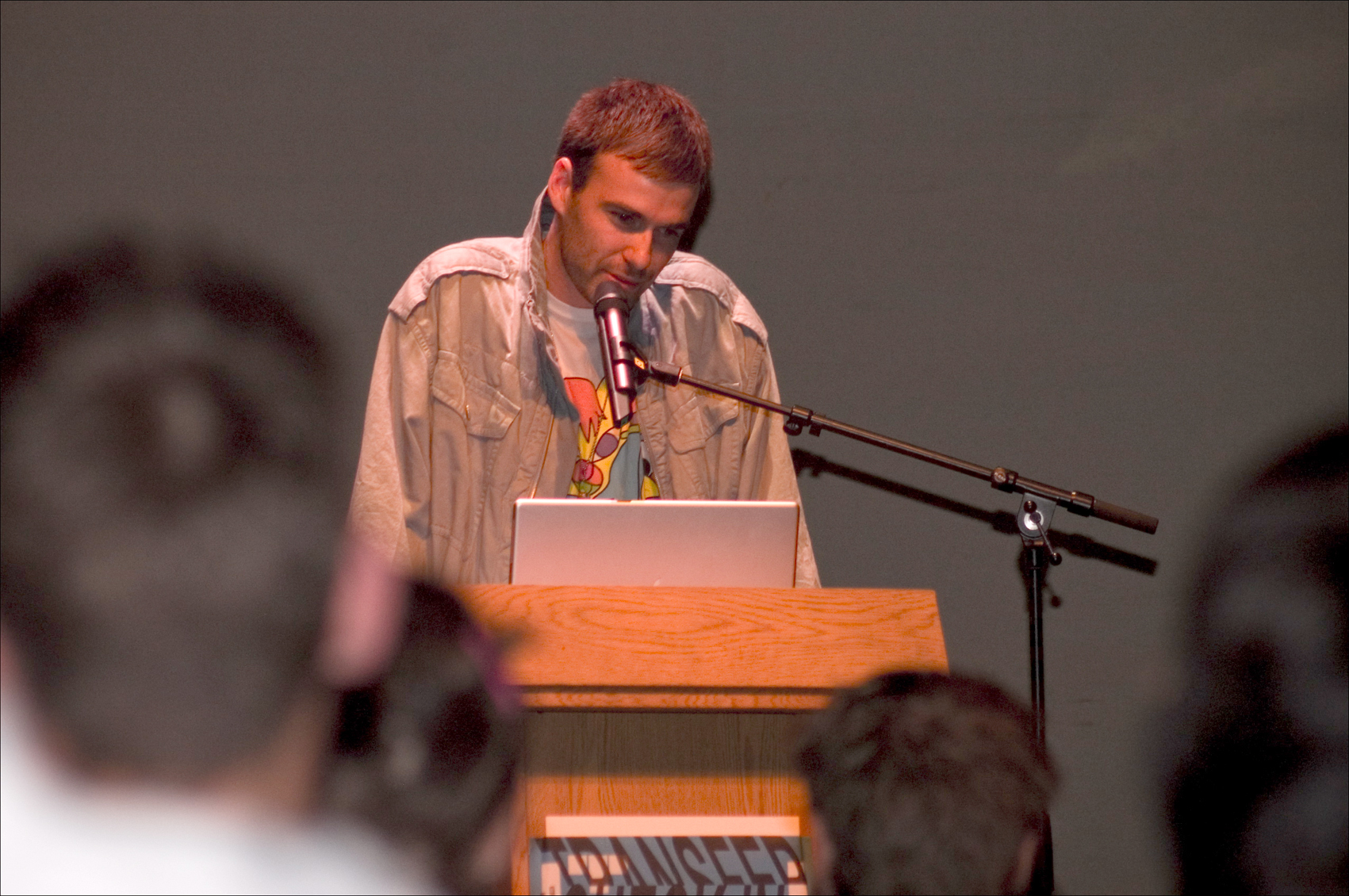
- Kris Moyes lecturing at TodaysArt in Den Haag, The Netherlands
- Born: Kristoffer Stephen Hope Moyes; 30 October 1978 (age 47); Sydney, New South Wales, Australia
- Occupations: Producer; Director
- Years active: 2005 - present
- Relatives: Kim Moyes

Kris Moyes (born 30 October 1978) is an Australian-born director and producer. He is perhaps best known for his innovative music videos and television advertisements.

In 2005 he directed The Presets "Are You The One?" which utilized a large array of film techniques that playfully proposed answers to who the "one" is. The video also featured a digital artifact motif he developed by interrupting the transfer of DIVX files of original footage from a PC to a Mac computer, to which many homage videos were made.

Moyes has had close ties to Modular Records since 2005. He is probably better known for his videos for Softlightes and The Presets. In 2008 Moyes directed a traditional performance based music video for Wolfmother "White Unicorn" on the condition that Pav, the head of Modular Records allowed him to deface his own work and re-release it, under the pseudonym Banditobruce. The piece of subterfuge was a reference to Marcel Duchamp's Readymade, L.H.O.O.Q.

Moyes has also directed four music videos for Sia. His first video for Sia's "Buttons" in 2007 was linked by Perez Hilton on his blog and received over 300,000 views in one day, becoming the No.1 Most Linked Music Video and No.2 Most Viewed Music Video on YouTube.

In 2010 Moyes directed and co-wrote a satirical short film, called "City Limits" featuring costumes by Australian fashion label, Romance Was Born. It was screened at ASVOFF (A Shaded View on Fashion Film) at the Centre Pompidou, Paris.

Moyes has also been exhibited alongside John Baldessari, Brian Bress, Miranda July, Peter Sutherland, Paper Rad, Melanie Bonajo, Michael Gondry, Spike Jonze, Chris Cunningham, Mark Romanek and Floria Sigmondi.

Over the years, Moyes has appeared in a number of publications including, L.A. Times, Esquire, Tokion, The Open Day Book and The New York Times where he was invited alongside Jeff Koons, Banks Violette, Oscar de la Renta and The Campana Brothers to re-design the ' T ' Logo for The New York Times Style Magazine.

In 2020, Moyes redesigned the identity for Australia's longest running TV program RAGE, the first redesign in over 30 years.

In 2022 Moyes produced the cinematic commercial for Bungie's Destiny 2: Lightfall directed by Ilya Abulkhanov.

In 2023 Moyes produced Honda "Keep Dreaming" directed by Alan Smith and Adam Foulkes.

== Early life and education ==
Born on 30 October 1978 in Sydney, New South Wales, Moyes graduated from the University of New South Wales's College of Fine Arts with a Bachelor of Fine Arts majoring in Time Based Art.

Moyes graduated from TAFE NSW with a Diploma of Fine Arts majoring in Photography and Sculpture. This is where Moyes met his life long mentor Geoff Kleem.

== Commercials ==
2024

- Honda - Keep Dreaming Campaign

2023

- e.l.f. (cosmetics) - eyes.lips.face.sticky Campaign with Jennifer Coolidge
- Apple - The Rescue Emergency SOS via satellite Campaign
- Dunkin' Donuts - Morning Coffee Spot
- Redfin - Housing Market Campaign (Spotlight and Try It On)

2022

- Bungie - Destiny 2: Lightfall Reveal Trailer
- Toyota GR Family - Race Cars for the Real World Campaign
- Toyota Corolla GR - Rally Ready Campaign

2020

- Rage (TV program) - Identity

2014

- Goldwell - A Tale of Two Hands

2012 Hoyts - Xtremescreen Cinema

- Honda Jazz - Imagination

2010

- Spring Valley Beverages - Smart Energy
- LG - Direct Drive
- Lacoste - Red !
- Cadbury - Come Together

== Music videos ==
2021

- Luke Hemmings - Baby Blue
- Luke Hemmings - Place In Me
- Luke Hemmings - Motion

2020

- Tokio Hotel - Monsoon 2020 (English Version)
- Tokio Hotel - Durch den Monsun 2020 (German Version)
- John The Blind - Time To Die

2019

- Kris Kelly - More
- Golf Alpha Bravo - Blue Wave
- Animal Feelings - Hawaii

2018

- Willaris. K - Perpetual Love
- The Presets - Downtown Shutdown

2017

- The Presets - "Do What You Want"
- Gordi - On My Side
- Wrabel - We Could Be Beautiful
- Tokio Hotel - Something new

2016

- Seekae - Turbine Blue
- The Temper Trap - Fall Together
- Mossy - Ginsberg
- Tkay Maidza - M.O.B.

2015

- Birds of Tokyo - This Fire
- Birds of Tokyo - Anchor
- Mossy - Electric Chair
- Mas Ysa - Margarita
- Mysteries - Newly Thrown

2014

- Tokio Hotel - Girl Got a Gun
- Mosman Alder - Germland
- Grizzly Bear - Sun in Your Eyes

2013

- Boy & Bear - Harlequin Dream
- Luke Temple - Florida
- Grizzly Bear - Gun-Shy
- Swift KID - Bed of Clouds (feat. Guy Sebastian)

2012

- Kirin J. Callinan - W II W

2011

- The Rapture - Sail Away

2010

- Bag Raiders - Way Back Home
- Sia - Clap Your Hands

2009

- Sia - Day Too Soon

2008

- Beck - Youthless
- Sia - The Girl You Lost To Cocaine
- Franz Ferdinand - Ulysses (ver.1)
- Hercules and Love Affair - You Belong

2007

- The Presets - My People
- Sia - Buttons
- Softlightes - Microwave
- Architecture in Helsinki - Heart it Races

2006

- Softlightes - Heart Made of Sound
- Wolfmother - White Unicorn (defaced)
- The Presets - Are You The One?

2003

- SPOD - Totally Rad

== Exhibitions and screenings ==
2015

- Marfa Film Festival, Texas

2013

- Australian Centre for the Moving Image, Victoria
- Dortmund U-Tower, Germany
- Marfa Film Festival, Texas
- 53rd Kraków Film Festival, Poland
- Sugar Mountain Festival, Victoria

2012

- Gutenberg Museum, Germany
- Chalk Horse Gallery, New South Wales
- Egoist TV, Russian Federation
- Zubroffka International Short Film Festival, Poland
- Digital Marrakech Festival, Kingdom of Morocco

2011

- Remote Gallery, Spain
- Los Angeles Contemporary Exhibitions, California

2010

- The Centre Pompidou, France
- Dendy Cinema, New South Wales
- Rooftop Cinema, Victoria

2009

- Space15Twenty, California
- Microcinema, California
- Monster Children Gallery, New South Wales
- Museum of Contemporary Art, New South Wales
- FIVECC, Spain

2008

- The New York Times 'T' Magazine, New York
- Art Institute of Chicago, Chicago
- Kassel Documentary Film & Video Festival, Germany
- Los Angeles Film Festival, California
- ViMus Film Festival, Portugal
- Kinofest Film Festival, Romania

2007

- Melbourne International Film Festival, Victoria
- RESFest USA, Europe & Asia
- Lumen Eclipse Media Arts Gallery, Massachusetts
- Austin Museum of Digital Art, Texas

== Awards and nominations ==
=== ARIA Music Awards ===
The ARIA Music Awards is an annual awards ceremony held by the Australian Recording Industry Association. They commenced in 1987.

Year	Nominee / work	Award	Result	Ref.
2018	Kris Moyes for The Presets "Do What You Want"	Best Video	Nominated	
2010	Kris Moyes for Sia "Clap Your Hands"	Best Video	Won	
2008	Kris Moyes for The Presets "My People"	Best Video	Won	

=== J Award ===
The J Awards are an annual series of Australian music awards that were established by the Australian Broadcasting Corporation's youth-focused radio station Triple J. They commenced in 2005.

Year	Nominee / work	Award	Result
2012	"Way II War" (Kirin J. Callinan)	Australian Video of the Year	Won

- Sydney Music, Art & Culture Awards (2013) Best On Screen - Kirin J. Callinan - W II W
- D&AD Awards (2008) nominee Best Music Video - The Presets "My People"
- MVPA Awards (2008) nominee Best Direction of a Female Artist - Sia "Buttons"
- MVPA Awards (2008) nominee Best Electronic Music Video - The Presets "My People"
- MVPA Awards (2007) nominee Best Video Produced for Under $25,000 - Wolfmother "White Unicorn (defaced)"
- MVPA Awards (2007) nominee Best Animated Music Video - The Softlightes "Heart Made of Sound"
- Australian Dance Music Awards (2006) - The Presets "Are You The One?"
- Antville MV Awards (2006) Best Unknown/Unsigned Director
