= Creep (band) =

Brooklyn based electronic music duo

CREƎP
- Origin: Brooklyn, New York City, U.S.
- Genres: Electronic, house, trip hop
- Years active: 2009–present
- Labels: CREEP INTL. Young Turks
- Members: Lauren Flax; Lauren Dillard
- Website: CREEP Official

Creep (stylized as CREƎP) is a Brooklyn based electronic music duo formed in 2009. The duo consists of Lauren Flax and Lauren Dillard. They initially signed to Young Turks, but later formed their own label, CREEP INTL. CREEP are best known for their singles "Days" (featuring Romy Madley Croft of the XX) and "You," in collaboration with popular American duo Nina Sky on their debut album Echoes.

== Career ==
=== 2009-2011: Formation ===
In 2009, Lauren Flax and Lauren Dillard formed CREEP after having been in projects together before. They initially signed up to the record label, Young Turks. Before the release of "Days" (featuring Romy XX), they started their own label, 'CREEP INTL.'. In January 2011, their second single "You", featuring Nina Sky, was released. On January 26, 2011, the music video for the song "Days" was released on Young Turks' official YouTube account. On May 15, 2011, the music video for "You" was released on the duo's official website. Late in the year, Flax revealed she was openly lesbian and CREEP continued with recording of their first album.

=== 2012-present: Echoes ===
In December 2011, "Animals" was released along with its music video. It was released as an official single on January 17, 2012. The song features vocals from Holly Miranda. In 2013, they released three singles from their debut album: "Call Her" (featuring Tricky and Alejandra De La Deheza of School of Seven Bells, "Vertigo" (featuring Lou Rhodes of Lamb) and "Dim the Lights" (featuring Sia). The album, Echoes was initially announced for an August 2013 release. It was eventually released worldwide on November 12. The album debuted at number eight on the iTunes Electronic Chart. Commenting on the album, Flax said: "It's amazing how it came together. It really was an organic process, which is truly important to us. The majority of the people on our record are friends, it really all came together perfectly." Dillard adds: "It took a while to finish since we had so many guest vocalists, but we're honored to have worked with so many talented artists." Flax also said: "We wrote it and produced it, so the final mixes had to be everything it could be. We wanted Chris Coady to mix our record, he had just finished Beach House, Zola Jesus, and Santigold and we loved the sound of those records. We had to wait for him and it was worth it". Echoes combines house, trip hop, electronic, and gospel elements in some songs.

== Discography ==
=== Studio albums ===
Title	Details
Echoes	Released: November 12, 2013; Label: CREEP INTL.

=== Singles ===
All singles were released from album Echoes

- "Days" (released on December 19, 2010) (Creep featuring Romy Madley Croft) (Young Turks)
- "You" (released on May 14, 2011) (Creep featuring Nina Sky) (Young Turks / CREEP INTL.)
- "Animals" (released on December 5, 2011) (Creep featuring Holly Miranda) (CREEP INTL.)
- "Call Her" (released on December 4, 2012) (Creep featuring Tricky and Alejandra De La Deheza) (CREEP INTL.)
- "Vertigo" (released on September 5, 2013) (Creep featuring Lou Rhodes) (CREEP INTL.)
- "Dim the Lights" (released on November 4, 2013) (Creep featuring Sia) (CREEP INTL)

== Remixes ==
- Memory Tapes - "Green Knight" (2010)
- FOE - "Deep Water Heartbreaker" (2011)
- Poly Styrene - "Virtual Boyfriend" (2011)
- She Wants Revenge - "Take the World" (2011)
- Azari & III - "Manic" (2011)
- Planningtorock - "Doorway" (2011)
- School of Seven Bells - "Lafayee" (2012)
- Alpines - "Empire" (2012)
- New Look - "Teen Need" (2012)
- Dillion - "Your Flesh" (2012)
- MNDR - "Feed Me Diamonds" (2013)
