= What's Come Inside of You =

Studio album by Freescha
- Released: May 6, 2003
- Genres: Electronic; Downtempo; IDM
- Length: 54:16
- Label: AttackNine (ATTCD003)

Freescha chronology
Slower Than Church Music (2000)	What's Come Inside of You (2003)	Head Warlock Double Stare (2006)

Professional ratings
Review scores
Source	Rating
Allmusic	link
Pitchfork Media	6.8/10 link

What's Come Inside of You is the third album by American electronic music group Freescha, released May 6, 2003 on AttackNine Records. It focuses on sexual themes, with most of the songs either having a sexual connotation or pornography samples embedded within the music.

== Track listing ==
1. "Rinky Dink" – 2:14
2. "Laser Love" – 5:31
3. "Feel Back" – 3:41
4. "Watcha Gonna Go for It?" – 5:33
5. "Drive Me Wide" – 4:17
6. "Smurf Shoe" – 5:39
7. "Baby Maker" – 2:56
8. "Lover Function" – 4:23
9. "Too Close to Cry" – 1:28
10. "Rap the Beat On" – 4:29
11. "The Sun is Still" – 2:17
12. "Come Good" – 4:13
13. "Radio Heart" – 3:35
14. "Star Black" – 4:07
