= Heather Heart =

- Also known as: Heather Heather
- Born: Heather Lotruglio; 1971 (age 54–55); Brooklyn, New York, United States
- Origin: New York City
- Genre: Techno
- Occupation: Disc jockey
- Instruments: Turntable, Sampler, TB 303, TR 909
- Years active: 1992–present
- Labels: Sonic Groove, Magnetic North, Communique

Heather Lotruglio (born 1971), better known as Heather Heart, is an American (New York) based Techno DJ.

In 1991, her zine called Under One Sky laid the foundation for a network of techno music fans across the US. In 1992, she began DJing, especially at the Storm raves. In 1995, she co-founded Groove records, the first techno record store in the United States.

== Life and musical career ==
Heather Heart was born in Brooklyn and grew up in the New York City area and started clubbing at the beginning of the underground dance music explosion influenced by the UK's "summer of love."

In 1990 Heart, along with Frankie Bones and his brother, fellow DJ Adam X, co-founded the first all-techno record store, Groove Record Shop, in Brooklyn. Shortly afterwards, Heart began an underground techno music zine Under One Sky (Archived PDF from 1992 available here ), founded in 1991, which created a forum wherein the US and global dance music undergrounds could share ideas and, increasingly cultural and spiritual messages. This work drew together fans, DJs, and producers within and across the US and helped create a flourishing music scene. In 1992 Heart began Djing, first under the name "Heather Heather," later changing it to Heather Heart. She became famous especially for djing the Storm Raves founded by fellow DJ Frankie Bones. The three have been called "The forefathers (and foremother) of New York techno." In 1995 they moved the store to Manhattan, and renamed it Sonic Groove. This became the center of the underground techno scene and a fixture in dance music, where Heart was a crucial, friendly and knowledgeable presence. About that time X and Heart began to throw their own parties under the name Mental.

These venues and parties were the backbone of the New York underground music scene, as well as becoming "the model for every city with an underground dance scene." In 1999, Heart was featured in the movie "Better Living Through Circuitry" about the US rave scene. In 2015, she was listed in Mixmag's "20 Women who shaped the History of Dance Music."

== Discography ==
- 1994 (as X-Heart, with Adam X) "Analogistic Warrior" Magnetic North
- 1997 "Blizzard" (on V/A Define The Sonic Groove) Sonic Groove
- 1995 (as X-Heart) "Solo siren" Communique Records
- 1998 (DJ Mix) "Eastbound Underground 01 (The Future Sound Of Sonic Groove 98)" Sonic Groove
