= Evvol =

Synth pop musical artists

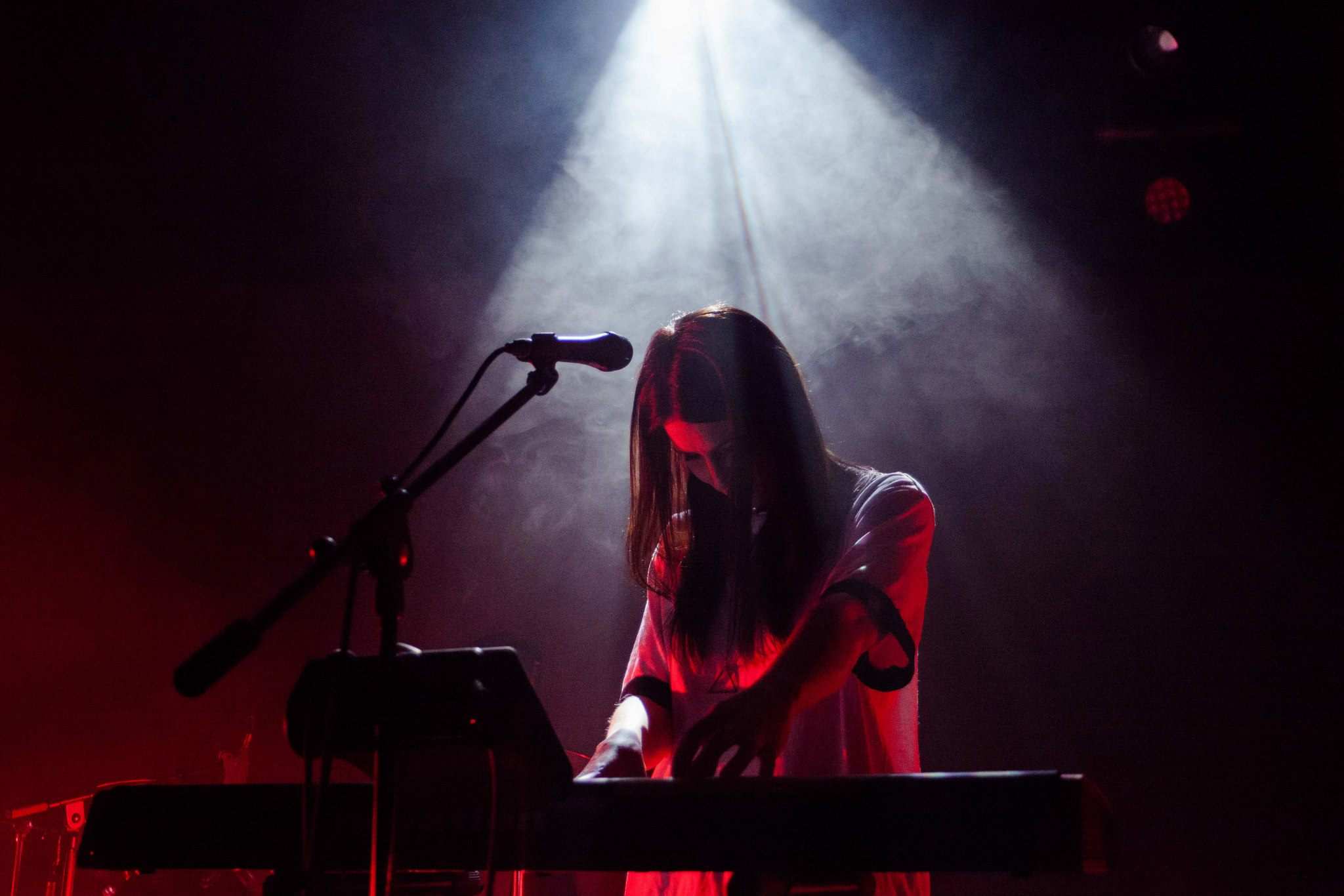
- Jon Dark, performing in 2015.

Background information
- Origin: Berlin, Germany
- Genres: Synthpop, dark wave, new wave, dream pop, indietronica
- Years active: 2015–present
- Labels: Mad Dog&Love, !K7 Records
- Members: Julie Chance, Jon Dark
- Website: www.evvolmusic.com

Evvol are a Berlin-based dark synth pop duo. The band consists of Irish woman Julie Chance and her Australian partner Jon Dark (a.k.a. Jane Arnison). They have toured extensively with Canadian band Austra. Evvol's sound has been described as music that plays on dualities – light and dark, entrapment and escape, immersion and surrender. Their debut album Eternalism was released on July 24, 2015, via !K7 Records.

== Discography ==
=== EPs ===
- Physical L.U.V (2016)

=== Studio albums ===
- Eternalism (2015)
- The Power (2020)

=== Singles ===
- No Love (2015)
- Your Love (2015)
- Sola (2015)
- Physical L.U.V (2016)
- Release Me (2018)
- Song For The Broken Hearted (Rollin’) (2018)
- It's Ok (2020)
- Help Myself (2020)
- The Power (2020)
- Speedboat (2020)
