= You've Changed (Sia song) =

Single by Lauren Flax featuring Sia
- Released: 21 July 2009
- Genre: House
- Length: 3:54
- Label: DJs Are Not Rockstars
- Composers: Sia Furler; Lauren Flax
- Lyricist: Sia Furler

Lauren Flax singles chronology
"You've Changed" (2009)	"Stronger Now" (2010)

"You've Changed"

Single by Sia

from the album We Are Born
- Released: 28 December 2009
- Recorded: 2009
- Studio: Bright Street Recorders (Los Angeles, CA); Kingsize Soundlabs (Los Angeles, CA)
- Genre: Disco
- Length: 3:10
- Label: Monkey Puzzle; Inertia
- Songwriters: Sia Furler; Lauren Flax
- Producers: Lauren Flax; Greg Kurstin

Sia singles chronology
"Academia" (2009)	"You've Changed" (2009)	"Under the Milky Way" (2010)

Music video
- "You've Changed" on YouTube

"You've Changed" is a song by Australian singer-songwriter Sia, which is the lead single from her fifth studio album We Are Born. "You've Changed" was originally co-written and released in 2009 by American DJ/producer Lauren Flax, which was then re-recorded for Sia's 2010 album, We Are Born. The single was announced through a Twitter update that Sia posted. The song was given away for free and was released on 28 December 2009. On 31 January 2010 the song peaked at number 31 on the Australian ARIA Singles Chart, becoming Sia's highest charting single on that chart until her 2014 hit "Chandelier". The song was placed 72 on the Triple J Hottest 100 countdown in 2009.

In the United States, the original Lauren Flax version reached number 47 on the Billboard Hot Dance Club Songs chart in April 2010. It was also one of the songs used in the Season 1 finale of The Vampire Diaries.

== Critical reception ==
Luke O'Neil of the Boston Globe wrote "It’s a pulse-quickening electro-disco cut with gritty, heartfelt soul falling out of its tight pants pockets." Johnathan Keefe of Slant said "You’ve Changed" was originally recorded as a shrill, tinny dance track, but Kurstin reworks it here to include a funk-based rhythm section that gives the song a more propulsive 4/4 beat and a greater depth of texture." Leah Greenblatt of Entertainment Weekly called the song "squiggly disco".

== Charts ==
Chart (2010)	Peak position
Australia (ARIA)	31
Netherlands (Dutch Top 40)	33
Netherlands (Single Top 100)	95

== Release history ==
Region	Date	Format	Label
Australia	28 December 2009	Digital download	Monkey Puzzle
New Zealand	28 December 2009	Digital download	Monkey Puzzle
Belgium	24 September 2010	Digital download	RCA
Finland	24 September 2010	Digital download	RCA
