= The Incredible Moses Leroy =

The Incredible Moses Leroy, the alter ego of ex-substitute teacher Ronald David "Ron" Fountenberry, is an American indie artist. The name is a juxtaposition of "The Incredible", a reference to a comic book, and his great-grandfather (a civil rights activist) Moses Leroy. His song "Fuzzy" was featured in This Film is Not Yet Rated, and on an episode of the American television sitcom Scrubs. "The 4a" was used in the film P.S. Along with members of El Ten Eleven, Fountenberry has gone on to form the band Softlightes.

He is the owner and creative director of music and sound design company Sounds Delicious

== Discography ==
- Bedroom Love Songs (1998)
- Growing Up Clean in America (March 28, 2000)
- Electric Pocket Radio (March 13, 2001)
- Become The Soft.Lightes (October 21, 2003)
