= We Are Born =

Studio album by Sia
- Released: 18 June 2010
- Recorded: 2009‒2010
- Studios: Kingsize Soundlabs (Los Angeles, California); Bright Street Studios (Los Angeles, California); Dubway Studios (New York City); Hobo Sound (New Jersey)
- Genres: Pop; dance-pop; new wave; synth-pop; R&B
- Length: 46:23
- Labels: Monkey Puzzle; Jive
- Producer: Greg Kurstin

Sia chronology
TV Is My Parent (2009)	We Are Born (2010)	Best Of... (2012)

Singles from We Are Born
- 1. "You've Changed" Released: 28 December 2009; 2. "Clap Your Hands" Released: 13 April 2010; 3. "Bring Night" Released: 10 September 2010

We Are Born is the fifth studio album by Australian singer-songwriter Sia. It was released on 18 June 2010 through Money Puzzle and Jive Records. The album is more upbeat album than her previous works, which she partly attributed to her relationship with JD Samson as well as her childhood influences Cyndi Lauper and Madonna. Produced by Greg Kurstin, featuring The Strokes' guitarist Nick Valensi, the album was supported by three singles: "You've Changed", "Clap Your Hands" and "Bring Night".

We Are Born debuted at number 2 on the Australian Albums Chart, being Sia's first top 10 release in her home country. The album won Best Pop Release and Best Independent Release at the 2010 ARIA Music Awards and received Gold accreditation in the Australian ARIA charts in 2011. At the J Awards of 2010, the album was nominated for Australian Album of the Year.

== Composition ==
We Are Born is a pop, dance-pop, new wave, synth-pop and R&B album that marks a significant stylistic shift from Sia's earlier, downtempo and anti-folk work. The album combines upbeat, club-ready tracks like "Clap Your Hands" and "You've Changed" with emotionally expressive moments such as her cover of Madonna's "Oh Father", showcasing Sia's versatile vocal delivery across a range of moods and genres. Its production, led by Greg Kurstin, emphasises polished, danceable arrangements with playful touches including funk-inspired rhythms, disco elements, and synth-driven textures, resulting in a bright, energetic, and accessible sound that retains traces of her earlier, introspective style.

== Singles ==
The first single, "You've Changed" was released in December 2009. "Clap Your Hands" was released in April 2010, as the second single from the album. "Bring Night" was released as the third and last single on 10 September 2010.

== Critical reception ==
Professional ratings
Aggregate scores
Source	Rating
Metacritic	68/100
Review scores
Source	Rating
AllMusic	4/5 stars
BBC Music	(mixed)
Billboard	(positive)
The Boston Globe	(positive)
Entertainment Weekly	B+
Paste	(mixed)
Pitchfork Media	6.6/10
Rolling Stone	3.5/5 stars
Slant Magazine	4/5 stars
Virgin Media	7/10

We Are Born was received with generally favorable reviews with a score of 68 at Metacritic based on 14 reviews.

AllMusic described We Are Born as a bright and energetic departure from Sia's earlier, downtempo material, calling it a "massive pop leap" characterised by upbeat dance tracks and light funk influences. The review praised Greg Kurstin's polished production and Sia's versatile vocals, noting the album's overall cheerful and optimistic tone. BBC Music described the album as a shift from the anti-folk sensibilities of Sia's earlier work towards a more polished, dance-pop direction, comparing it to artists such as Kesha, Little Boots and Lady Gaga. The Boston Globe praised We Are Born for showcasing Sia's ability to combine emotional authenticity with infectious, dance-oriented pop. It concluded that while the album aligns with mainstream pop trends, Sia distinguishes herself through songwriting that carries lived emotion rather than disposability. Entertainment Weekly described the album as an energetic collection that sees Sia exploring "more caffeinated avenues", including funk, soul, and disco styles, characterising the album as "party music with a heart".

Paste offered a more critical view, describing the record as mild in tone despite its brief ventures into disco and pop rock. Slant Magazine praised Sia's leap into pop, noting its "disco- and funk-infused" production and drawing attention to the albu/ warmth and humanity. Finally, Pitchfork regarded We Are Born as a fast-paced, upbeat pop record with elements of beat-led pop and guitar-driven pop rock, supported by Kurstin's bright production and Nick Valensi's electric guitar work.

The album was nominated for a J Award on 26 July 2010. At the 2010 ARIA Music Awards, We Are Born was nominated for Album of the Year, Best Pop Release and Best Independent Release. "Clap Your Hands" was nominated for Single of the Year. Kris Moyes won best video for Sia's video for "Clap Your Hands". Sia and Samuel Dixon were nominated for Song of the Year at the 2011 APRA Music Awards for the single "Clap Your Hands".

== Commercial performance ==
We Are Born was noticeably more successful than Sia's previous work and charted in countries where no Sia album had charted before. It debuted at number 2 on the Australian Albums Chart behind Eminem's Recovery, at number 37 on the US Billboard 200 albums chart, at number 9 on the Greek international albums chart, number 13 on the Dutch Albums Chart, number 38 in Switzerland, number 80 in Belgium, number 14 in Denmark, number 24 in Finland, number 73 in Germany and number 60 in Canada. The album also debuted at number 74 on the UK Albums Chart in the week ending 3 October 2010, making it her first album to reach the top 100 there. We Are Born received Gold accreditation for shipments of 35,000 copies in the Australian ARIA charts in 2011.

== Track listing ==
All tracks were produced by Greg Kurstin.

Standard edition (Europe)
No.	Title	Writer(s)	Length
1.	"The Fight"	Sia Furler; Dan Carey	3:39
2.	"Clap Your Hands"	Furler; Samuel Dixon	3:58
3.	"Stop Trying"	Furler; Greg Kurstin	2:40
4.	"You've Changed"	Furler; Lauren Flax	3:11
5.	"Be Good to Me"	Furler; Jesse Graham; Simon Katz	3:57
6.	"Bring Night"	Furler; Kurstin	2:57
7.	"Hurting Me Now"	Furler; Kurstin	3:26
8.	"Never Gonna Leave Me"	Furler; Kurstin	3:34
9.	"Cloud"	Furler; Dixon	3:43
10.	"I'm in Here"	Furler; Dixon	3:41
11.	"The Co-Dependent"	Furler; Kurstin	2:55
12.	"Big Girl Little Girl"	Furler; Henry Binns	4:18
13.	"Oh Father"	Madonna Ciccone; Patrick Leonard	4:29
Total length:			42:36

US & AUS/NZ Bonus Track
No.	Title	Writer(s)	Length
14.	"I'm in Here" (Piano Vocal Version)	Furler; Dixon	3:47
Total length:			46:23

Amazon MP3 bonus track
No.	Title	Writer(s)	Length
15.	"Hold Me Down"	Furler; Carey	4:22
Total length:			50:45

== Personnel ==
Credits were adapted from Sia's official website.

- Henry Binns – composer
- Felix Bloxsom – drums, additional vocals
- Dan Carey – composer
- Madonna Ciccone – composer
- Pierre de Reeder – engineer
- Samuel Dixon – composer, bass
- Lauren Flax – composer
- Sia Furler – vocals, composer
- Brian Gardner – mastering
- Inara George – additional vocals
- Jesse Graham – composer
- Spencer Hoad – assistant engineer
- Simon Katz – composer
- Oliver Kraus – strings
- Greg Kurstin – producer, engineer, mix, keyboards, guitar, bass, xylophone, drums, programming
- Rachel Kurstin – project coordinator
- Patrick Leonard – composer
- Jolie Levine – production coordinator/contractor
- Eric Litz – assistant engineer
- Andrew Lynch – acoustic piano
- Aaron Redfield – drums
- Gus Seyffert – guitar
- Eric Spring – vocal recording
- Dave Trumfio – engineer, mix
- Nick Valensi – guitar

== Charts ==
Weekly chart performance for We Are Born
Chart (2010–2011)	Peak position
Australian Albums (ARIA)	2
Belgian Flemish (Ultratop)	80
Belgian Walloon (Ultratop)	42
Canadian Albums (Billboard)	60
Danish Albums (Tracklisten)	14
Dutch Albums (Dutch Charts)	13
Dutch Combi Albums (Dutch Charts)	19
Finnish Albums (ÄKT / IFPI Finland)	24
French Albums (SNEP)	42
German Albums (Offizielle Top 100)	73
Greek Albums (IFPI Greece)	9
Swiss Albums Top 100 (Media Control)	38
UK Albums (Official Charts)	74
US Billboard 200	37

== Certifications ==
Certifications and sales for We Are Born
Region	Certification	Certified units/sales
Australia (ARIA)	Gold	35,000^{^}
^{^} Shipments figures based on certification alone.
