= Freescha =

American musical duo

- Origin: San Fernando Valley, California, USA
- Genres: Electronic, IDM, downtempo, rappity-rap
- Years active: 1999-present
- Labels: Attacknine
- Members: currently regrowing members
- Website: http://www.attacknine.com/

Freescha is the musical collaboration of Nick Huntington and Mike McGroarty, based in the San Fernando Valley, California. Huntington and McGroarty have been friends and partners since they met in high school. The duo has released most of their music on Attacknine Records, which is co-run by Huntington and McGroarty.

AllMusic compared the duo's sound to the "nostalgic electronica" of Boards of Canada. Freescha was chosen for URB magazine's "Next 100" artists to watch for in their 2004 year-end special issue.

Freescha co-wrote with Sia the song "Buttons" for Sia's 2008 album, Some People Have Real Problems, and co-wrote with Nicole Morier the song "Heaven On Earth" for Britney Spears's 2007 studio album, Blackout.

== Discography ==
=== Albums ===
- 2001 - Kids Fill the Floor - (Attacknine)
- 2002 - Slower Than Church Music - (Attacknine)
- 2003 - What's Come Inside of You - (Attacknine)
- 2006 - Head Warlock Double Stare - (Attacknine)
- 2007 - Freeschaland - (Attacknine)

=== Singles & EPs ===
- 1999 - Bulb - Single - (Attacknine)
- 2000 - Freescha - EP - (Attacknine)
- 2000 - Pequod - Single - (Attacknine)
- 2004 - Split EP with Casino Versus Japan - EP - (Wobblyhead)
- 2011 - Babies In Your Body - (Attacknine)

== See also ==
- List of ambient music artists
