= Some People Have Real Problems =

Studio album by Sia
- Released: 8 January 2008
- Recorded: 2007
- Genre: Pop; soul
- Length: 59:15
- Label: Hear Music; Monkey Puzzle
- Producer: Jimmy Hogarth

Sia chronology
Lady Croissant (2007)	Some People Have Real Problems (2008)	TV Is My Parent (2009)

Singles from Some People Have Real Problems
- 1. "Day Too Soon" Released: 6 November 2007; 2. "The Girl You Lost to Cocaine" Released: 27 March 2008; 3. "Soon We'll Be Found" Released: 13 October 2008; 4. "Buttons" Released: 25 November 2008; 5. "Academia" Released: 1 January 2009

Alternative cover

Some People Have Real Problems (sometimes stylised as Some People Have REAL Problems) is the fourth studio album by Australian singer Sia. Released in 2008, the album features five singles: "Day Too Soon", "The Girl You Lost to Cocaine", "Soon We'll Be Found", and "Academia". In live performances of "Soon We'll Be Found", Sia used sign language to accompany her singing. The album displays a more upbeat pop-style than Sia's previous downbeat albums, whilst show-casing Sia's vocals on a number of big ballads.

The fourth single, "Buttons", received attention due to its video in which Sia's face is distorted by pegs, string, net, condoms and many other things. The album debuted at number 26 on the US Billboard 200 chart, which became Sia's first album to chart on the Billboard 200 in her career.

== Background ==
Sia, talking about the inspiration for the album's name, said: "During recording people would come in and complain about traffic, and I'd say, 'Some people have real problems.' Like, they're waiting for a lung or they don't have a mum," she says. "I thought it would be a funny name for an album. And then I thought if I were to get rich and successful I would remember to not turn into an asshole. But I am one, so it didn't work."

== Singles ==
The first single "Day Too Soon" was released on 12 November 2007 in the UK, and it was followed by "The Girl You Lost to Cocaine" on 21 April 2008. Later "The Girl You Lost to Cocaine" was followed by "Soon We'll Be Found", which was released on 13 October 2008 as third single of the album. "Buttons" was released as the fourth single in November 2008. On 1 January 2009, "Academia" was released as the fifth and final single from the album.

== Critical reception ==
Some People Have Real Problems ratings
Aggregate scores
Source	Rating
Metacritic	64/100
Review scores
Source	Rating
AllMusic	4.5/5 stars
Billboard	Positive
The Boston Globe	Positive
The Boston Phoenix	3/4 stars
Entertainment Weekly	A−
The Guardian	2/5 stars
Pitchfork Media	4.8/10
Robert Christgau	(dud)
Rolling Stone	2/5 stars
Slant Magazine	4.5/5 stars

Some People Have Real Problems received generally favourable reviews from music critics. At Metacritic, which assigns a normalised rating out of 100 to reviews from mainstream critics, the album received an average score of 64, based on 20 reviews.

Reviewers such as Rolling Stone and The Guardian, both of whom awarded the album 2 out of 5 stars, and Robert Christgau who gave it a "dud" score were highly critical. Other reviewers, however, such as AllMusic and Slant both of whom awarded the album 4.5 out of 5 stars and Entertainment Weekly who gave the album an "A−" were highly positive towards the album.

== Chart performance ==
Following its release, the album debuted at number 26 on the US Billboard 200 chart, selling about 20,000 copies in its first week. The album was also chosen as iTunes' Top Pop Album of 2008. The album was certified Gold by the Australian Recording Industry Association in 2011.

== Track listing ==
All tracks were produced by Jimmy Hogarth.

Some People Have Real Problems – standard edition
No.	Title	Writer(s)	Length
1.	"Little Black Sandals"	Sia Furler; Dan Carey	4:14
2.	"Lentil"	Furler; Samuel Dixon	4:27
3.	"Day Too Soon"	Furler; Dixon	4:24
4.	"You Have Been Loved"	Furler; Clifford Jones; Peter-John Vettese	4:23
5.	"The Girl You Lost to Cocaine"	Furler; Rob Allum; Phil Marten; Eddie Myer	2:40
6.	"Academia"	Furler; Carey	3:16
7.	"I Go to Sleep"	Ray Davies	3:47
8.	"Playground"	Furler; Dixon; Felix Bloxsom	3:29
9.	"Death by Chocolate"	Furler; Greg Kurstin	5:03
10.	"Soon We'll Be Found"	Furler; Rick Nowels	4:21
11.	"Electric Bird"	Furler; Henry Binns	4:26
12.	"Beautiful Calm Driving"	Furler; Dixon	5:02
13.	"Lullaby" (including hidden track "Buttons")	Furler; Dixon	9:55
Total length:			59:15

Some People Have Real Problems – Spotify bonus tracks
No.	Title	Length
14.	"Buttons"	3:20
15.	"Cares at the Door"	3:49
Total length:		66:24

Some People Have Real Problems – physical CD bonus tracks
No.	Title	Length
14.	"Blame It on the Radio"	2:32
15.	"Bring It to Me"	3:33
16.	"Buttons"	3:20

=== Notes ===
- "Buttons" is a hidden track after "Lullaby" on the international edition of the album, but it is a normal track on the Australian edition, in which it was the first single. "Buttons" was written by Freescha and Sia.
- "Blame It On the Radio" and "Bring It to Me" were b-sides for "The Girl You Lost to Cocaine" and "Soon We'll Be Found".

== Personnel ==
- Sia Furler – vocals
- Beck – backing vocals (tracks 6 and 9)
- Dan Carey – guitar (track 6)
- Tony Cousins – mastering
- Larry Goldings – keyboards (tracks 1–4, 7, 10, 12 and 13)
- Jimmy Hogarth – guitar (tracks 1, 4, 6, 11 and 13), keyboards (track 1), percussion (track 6)
- Jim Hunt – brass (tracks 5 and 11)
- Greg Kurstin – keyboards (track 9)
- Pantera Marvelous (Sia's pet dog) – backing vocals (track 9)
- Giovanni Ribisi – backing vocals (track 9)
- Jason Lee – backing vocals (track 9)
- Martin Slattery – clarinet and flute (track 6), percussion (track 3)
- Emery Dobyns — recording engineer
- Eric Spring — recording engineer
- Eddie Stevens – keyboards (tracks 2, 3, 5–11 and 13)
- Joey Waronker – drums (tracks 2–11 and 13), percussion (tracks 5, 7 and 8)
- Felix Bloxsom – drums (tracks 1 and 12), percussion (track 1)
- Jeremy Wheatley – mixing
- Khoa Truong – guitar tracking and arranging
- Samuel Dixon – bass guitar on all tracks

== Charts ==
Some People Have Real Problems chart performance
Chart (2008–09)	Peak position
Australian Albums (ARIA)	41
Belgian Albums (Ultratop Flanders)	83
Belgian Albums (Ultratop Wallonia)	52
French Albums (SNEP)	58
UK Albums (OCC)	106
US Billboard 200	26
US Top Alternative Albums (Billboard)	5

== Certifications ==
Some People Have Real Problems certifications
Region	Certification	Certified units/sales
Australia (ARIA)	Gold	35,000^{^}
^{^} Shipments figures based on certification alone.

== Release history ==
Some People Have Real Problems release history
Region	Date	Label	Catalog
United States	8 January 2008	Monkey Puzzle; Hear Music	HMCD–30629
United Kingdom	14 January 2008	Monkey Puzzle	MPRCDC1
