= Buttons (Sia song) =

- Re-mixes cover

Single by Sia

from the album Some People Have Real Problems
- B-side: "Re-mixes"
- Released: 25 November 2008
- Recorded: 2007
- Studio: The Bank (Los Angeles)
- Genre: Indie pop; new wave
- Length: 3:24
- Label: Hear Music; Inertia
- Songwriters: Sia Furler; Nick Huntington and Michael McGroarty
- Producer: Jimmy Hogarth

Sia singles chronology
"Soon We'll Be Found" (2008)	"Buttons" (2008)	"Academia" (2009)

Music video
- "Buttons" on YouTube

"Buttons" is a song by Australian singer-songwriter Sia. "Buttons" was released as a promotional single in 2007 and as the fourth single from her fourth studio album, Some People Have Real Problems. The song is a bonus track on the Australian edition and a hidden track (following "Lullaby") on the international edition of the album.

Re-mixes were released in the US on 25 November 2008 and a 1-track digital single in New Zealand on 9 February 2009 through Spinnin Records. The Chris Lake Vocal Mix is included on the album, "Ultra Music Festival 03" The CSS remix is included on the album, "Triple J Hottest 100, Vol. 17" after coming in at number 50 in the annual poll.

== Critical reception ==
In a review of the album We Are Born, Bradley Stern of MuuMuse said "Bubblier up-tempos, such as 'Buttons' ... demonstrated Sia's ability to go beyond the realm of the ballad."

== Track listing ==
The Remixes (US)

1. Buttons (Jimmy Vallance Edit) – 2:58
2. Buttons (Jimmy Vallance Remix) – 7:02
3. Buttons (Chris Lake Remix) – 6:42
4. Buttons (Chris Lake Dub) – 6:40
5. Buttons (Markus Schulz Coldharbour Remix) – 6:57
6. Buttons (Markus Schulz Coldharbour Dub) – 6:15

New Zealand Version

1. Buttons (Bart Hendrix Deep Dope Remix) – 6:10

The Remixes (International)

1. Buttons (Jimmy Vallance Edit) – 2:58
2. Buttons (Original Mix) – 7:02
3. Buttons (Chris Lake Vocal Mix) – 6:42
4. Buttons (Markus Schulz Vocal Mix) – 6:57
5. Buttons (CSS Remix) – 3:26
6. Buttons (Filterheadz Remix) – 7:45
7. Buttons (Chris Lake Dub Mix) – 6:40
8. Buttons (Markus Schulz Dub Mix) – 6:15

== Music video ==
The video clip was directed by Kris Moyes and released in July 2007. In it, Sia physically distorts her face, adopts grotesque expressions, and attaches objects to her head. The clip was uploaded by Perez Hilton on his blog and was viewed more than 250,000 times in 3 hours. Due to the negative comments about her appearance, Sia blogged about the disappointment of reading this, specifically referencing reading about her snaggletooth (a tooth that is broken or not in alignment with the others). In this blog, she also discussed how the concept of the video developed, how the video was 'fun' "apart from the whole clothes pegs on my face moment" but how the video has made her famous as it was pretty much worth it. This blog also uploaded on Perez Hilton's site on 31 July.

The clip remains one of her most recognisable clips to date.

== Chart performance ==
The single "Buttons" and the album Some People Have Real Problems both debuted on their respective ARIA charts on the week commencing 6 April 2009. This was a result of a combination of Sia completing her first Australian tour, coupled with television and other appearances (including a gig in Sydney's iTunes store).

=== Weekly charts ===
Chart (2009)	Peak position
Australia (ARIA)	61
Australian Artist (ARIA)	14
(ARIA) Hit Seekers	1
