= Samuel Dixon =

- Born: 1973 (age 52–53); Adelaide, South Australia, Australia
- Genres: Pop, rock, alternative rock
- Occupations: Record producer, songwriter, multi-instrumentalist
- Instruments: Bass guitar, keyboards, guitar
- Website: samuel-dixon.com

Samuel Dixon (born 1973) is an Australian record producer, songwriter and musician, based in London. Dixon has produced and written with artists including Adele, Sia, Kylie Minogue, Christina Aguilera, Paloma Faith and Jack Savoretti. He is a multi-instrumentalist, best known for his work as a bass guitarist.

== Biography ==
Dixon co-wrote with Adele and produced the track "Love in the Dark" from her album 25. He played bass in Adele's live band throughout the promotion and touring for 21, and can be seen on Adele's Live at the Royal Albert Hall DVD.

Dixon has frequently collaborated with fellow-Australian Sia. His compositions have featured on her albums, Colour the Small One, Some People Have Real Problems, We Are Born, 1000 Forms of Fear and the deluxe version of This Is Acting. Dixon co-wrote the single "Clap Your Hands", from We Are Born. He played bass in Sia's live and studio band from 2003 to 2010.

Dixon and Furler co-wrote four songs with Christina Aguilera for her 2010 album Bionic, including the second single, "You Lost Me", with Dixon producing the songs. Dixon produced and co-wrote "Bound to You" which Aguilera performed in the 2010 movie, Burlesque and which was nominated for the 2010 Golden Globe Award for Best Original Song.

Other production and writing credits include Jack Savoretti, Carly Rae Jepsen (co-production as "The High Street"), Paloma Faith, I Blame Coco, KT Tunstall, Will Young, the Presets (notably on their 2005 song, "Girl and the Sea") and Leona Naess. Dixon co-wrote and produced There There by fellow-Australian Megan Washington.

Dixon's primary instrument is the bass guitar. His playing can be heard on recordings such as "Put Your Records On" by Corinne Bailey Rae, "Warwick Avenue" by Duffy, Tom Jones' "Spirit in the Room", Ryan Adams' "Ashes & Fire" and "Ludlow Street" by Suzanne Vega. Dixon played bass for Australian band Directions in Groove in the 1990s.

Originally from Adelaide, Australia, he currently lives and works in London. He is published by BMG Chrysalis UK.

== Discography ==
Selected production and songwriting credits

- 2004 – The Presets - Beams (songwriter "Girl and the Sea")
- 2004 – Sia - Colour the Small One (songwriter, (6 tracks) including "Where I Belong")
- 2007 – KT Tunstall - Drastic Fantastic (songwriter "Someday Soon")
- 2008 – Sia - Some People Have Real Problems (songwriter, (5 tracks))
- 2008 – Leona Naess - Thirteens (songwriter and producer (7 tracks))
- 2009 – Paloma Faith - Do You Want the Truth or Something Beautiful? (songwriter and producer, "My Legs Are Weak")
- 2010 – Sia - We Are Born (songwriter, (3 tracks) including "Clap Your Hands")
- 2010 – Christina Aguilera - Bionic (songwriter and producer, (3 tracks) including "You Lost Me")
- 2010 – Christina Aguilera - Burlesque: Original Motion Picture Soundtrack - "Bound to You"
- 2010 – I Blame Coco - The Constant (songwriter and producer, "Turn Your Back on Love")
- 2012 – Paloma Faith - Fall to Grace (songwriter, "Freedom")
- 2014 – Sia - 1000 Forms of Fear (songwriter, "Fire Meet Gasoline")
- 2014 – Megan Washington - There There (songwriter and producer)
- 2015 – Jack Savoretti - Written In Scars (songwriter and producer, (4 tracks))
- 2015 – Carly Rae Jepsen - Emotion (songwriter and producer, "Making the Most of the Night")
- 2016 – Sia - This Is Acting (Deluxe Edition) (songwriter, "Jesus Wept")
- 2016 – Adele - 25 (songwriter and producer, "Love in the Dark")
- 2016 – Jack Savoretti - Sleep No More
- 2017 – Paloma Faith - "Warrior" (songwriter and producer)
- 2017 – Noel Gallagher's High Flying Birds - Who Built The Moon? (bass guitar, (3 tracks))
- 2018 – Kylie Minogue - Golden (songwriter and producer, "Music's Too Sad Without You")
- 2020 – Eves Karydas - Further Than the Planes Fly (songwriter and producer)
- 2020 – Katie Melua - Album No. 8 (songwriter, "A Love Like That")
- 2021 – Jack Savoretti - Europiana (songwriter and producer, "Mea Culpa")

== Awards and nominations ==
- APRA Music Awards of 1996 – won Most Performed Jazz Work for "Futures", songwriter
- ARIA Music Awards of 2010 – nominated for Single of the Year for "Clap Your Hands", songwriter
- 68th Golden Globe Awards – nominated for Best Original Song for "Bound to You" from Burlesque
- APRA Music Awards of 2011 – nominated for Song of the Year for "Clap Your Hands"
- 59th Annual Grammy Awards – won Album of the Year for 25, producer
- APRA Music Awards of 2017 – won Overseas Recognition Award
