= Soon We'll Be Found =

Single by Sia

from the album Some People Have Real Problems
- B-side: "Bring It to Me"
- Released: 13 October 2008
- Recorded: 2007
- Studio: Jimmy's Place (London); The Bank (Los Angeles)
- Genre: Pop; easy listening
- Length: 4:20
- Label: Hear Music
- Songwriters: Sia Furler; Rick Nowels
- Producer: Jimmy Hogarth

Sia singles chronology
"The Girl You Lost to Cocaine" (2008)	"Soon We'll Be Found" (2008)	"Buttons" (2008)

Music video
- "Soon We'll Be Found" on YouTube

"Soon We'll Be Found" is a song by Australian singer-songwriter Sia. Released on 13 October 2008, "Soon We'll Be Found" is Sia's third single from her fourth studio album, Some People Have Real Problems (2008). The single is only available for download in the UK, but the music video for "Soon We'll Be Found", in which Sia signs the lyrics in American Sign Language, was featured on the United States iTunes Store main page when it became the free music download of the week of 4 November 2008. Sia performed the song on Later... with Jools Holland on 7 October 2008, and on the Late Show with David Letterman on 13 November 2008.

== Release ==
"Soon We'll Be Found" was released in the United Kingdom on 13 October 2008 by Monkey Puzzle Records. The single was made available in other European countries on 12 January 2009.

== Music video ==
"I've always been obsessed with the beauty of sign language. ... To ignorant hearing me, the movement and expression appears as a dance — a beautiful, emotive dance. But the real beauty is the communication hidden within these perfect shapes."
Sia Furler (on sign language)

The music video of "Soon We'll Be Found" was directed by Claire Carré. In the music video, Sia sings while signing the lyrics in American Sign Language.

The music video for "Soon We'll Be Found" gained popularity after it was featured on the iTunes main page in the United States from 4–10 November 2008.

=== Reception ===
Sia signs "turn around" in her music video with other actors.

The song and music video received critical acclaim. Spin magazine responded well to the song, explaining that "it seems as if it was all a dream—and with Sia's swooning voice and sweeping orchestration, it sure feels like one". Carl Williams of Last Broadcast wrote that "the composition is grand and the effect is stylish and powerful," and compared her vocals with those of Dusty Springfield. Amuze called "Soon We'll Be Found" a "stunning new single".

Likewise, the music video received good reviews by professional critics and bloggers alike. Jeremy Elder, a blogger on WordPress, wrote it was "a gorgoues [sic], trippy day-glow romp." Spinner described it as "sign language, shadow puppets and fluorescent latex [incorporated] into one beautifully choreographed video." Neufutur acclaimed "Soon We'll Be Found" for its usage of sign language, and called Some People Have Real Problems "Sia's best recording yet!" Brian James of Rone Break argued that Sia demonstrated her artistic and musical side with this music video, and said it was "the way music videos should be done."

== Commercial performance ==
In Australia, "Soon We'll Be Found" debuted at number 89 on the ARIA Singles Chart on the chart issue dated 4 May 2009. The single also charted at number 17 on the Flemish Ultratip chart, and number 13 on the Walloon Ultratip chart. In the United Kingdom, the single debuted at number 182 on the UK Singles Chart. The following week, it reached number 94, its highest position on the chart.

== Track listings ==
UK digital download

1. "Soon We'll Be Found (Radio Edit)" – 3:52
2. "Soon We'll Be Found" – 4:20

European digital download

1. "Soon We'll Be Found (Radio Edit)" – 3:52

EP

1. "Soon We'll Be Found (Radio Edit)" – 3:52
2. "Soon We'll Be Found" – 4:20
3. "Bring It to Me" – 3:38
4. "Soon We'll Be Found" (music video) – 3:59

== Charts ==
Chart performance for "Soon We'll Be Found"
Chart (2008–2009)	Peak position
Australia (ARIA)	89
Belgium (Ultratip Bubbling Under Flanders)	17
Belgium (Ultratip Bubbling Under Wallonia)	13
UK Singles (Official Charts Company)	94
