= The Girl You Lost to Cocaine =

- Remix EP artwork

Single by Sia

from the album Some People Have Real Problems
- B-side: "Blame It on the Radio"
- Released: 27 March 2008
- Recorded: 2007
- Studio: Jimmy's Place (London); The Bank (Los Angeles)
- Genre: Pop; Chamber pop
- Length: 2:40
- Label: Hear Music
- Songwriters: Sia Furler; Rob Allum; Phil Marten; Eddie Myer
- Producer: Jimmy Hogarth

Sia singles chronology
| "I'll Forget You" (2008) | "The Girl You Lost to Cocaine" (2008) | "Soon We'll Be Found" (2008) |

Music video
- "The Girl You Lost to Cocaine" on YouTube

"The Girl You Lost to Cocaine" (sometimes titled "The Girl You Lost") is a song by Australian singer-songwriter Sia. It was released on 27 March 2008, as the second single from her fourth studio album, Some People Have Real Problems.

== Background ==
Sia said the album Some People Have Real Problems was an easy album to write, except for, "The Girl You Lost" which took longer to pen than the other tracks. She explained: "It's like a bath. It's a big bath. I can sit down with my friends and play three chords or whatever or we'll hunt around and find the right three chords. Then they'll tell me what the song's about. Usually a sentence or a feeling will come or I can even just say to the person I'm with to tell me what it's about and give me a theme. Then eight minutes later, there it is. 'Academia' took eight minutes. 'Little Black Sandals' was five minutes. Then there are other songs that might take longer. 'The Girl You Lost to Cocaine' took a bit longer, but I don't remember why. I think I listened to it too much. It's different every time, but usually if it's a good one, it's like a bath."

== Lyrics ==
Despite describing herself as having "stuck around, through thick and through thin", the speaker leaves a relationship. She states that she does not need drama and that there is nothing the other can do to get her to stay.

== Reception ==
Huw Jones of GigWise gave the song 7/10, saying; "With no room for pleasantries or compromises, her latest release is strong, confident, infectiously melodic and immensely hummable romp through the highs and lows of Sia’s unique character and up beat independence. And as always Sia’s vocal brings with it a much needed and long overdue burst of sunshine that will warm even the stoniest of hearts".

A staff writer of The Mirror said; "With its pumping brass arrangement and over-expressive, too-keen-to-please vocals, this is the sort of declamatory record more suited to the US market than the British one. File under the bull-in-a-china-shop approach to pop."

Flak of Behind the Hype said, "I’m not sure if "The Girl You Lost to Cocaine" is literal in its meaning, but the song talks about her fail whale of a lover, who she is about to leave. Being fed up with someone in a relationship is something I’ve seen happen time and time again, but to leave that person is easier said than done, so this song felt good to me, on principle alone."

Amber Henson of The Red Alert considered the song to be "intensely addictive and heartfelt".

== Track listing ==
CD, digital download and streaming UK

1. The Girl You Lost to Cocaine - 2:40
2. Blame It on the Radio - 2:31

North America digital download and streaming – remixes EP

1. The Girl You Lost to Cocaine (StoneBridge Edit) - 3:07
2. The Girl You Lost to Cocaine (Sander Van Doorn Edit) - 3:00
3. The Girl You Lost to Cocaine (Mark Picchiotti Edit) - 3:10
4. The Girl You Lost to Cocaine (StoneBridge Remix) - 7:49
5. The Girl You Lost to Cocaine (Sander Van Doorn Remix) - 7:04
6. The Girl You Lost to Cocaine (Mark Picchiotti Remix) - 6:58
7. The Girl You Lost to Cocaine (StoneBridge Dub) - 6:47
8. The Girl You Lost to Cocaine (Mark Picchiotti Drama Dub) - 7:28

Vinyl/ 12"

- A1 "The Girl You Lost to Cocaine" (Sander Van Doorn Remix) - 7:09
- B1 "The Girl You Lost to Cocaine" (Stonebridge Vocal Remix) - 7:50
- B2 "The Girl You Lost to Cocaine" (Stonebridge Dub) - 6:50

== Charts ==
=== Weekly charts ===
| Chart (2008) | Peak position |
|---|---|
| Hungary (Dance Top 40) | 30 |
| Netherlands (Dutch Top 40) | 14 |
| Netherlands (Single Top 100) | 11 |
| Spain (PROMUSICAE) | 12 |
| US Dance Club Songs (Billboard) | 8 |

=== Year-end charts ===
| Chart (2008) | Position |
|---|---|
| Netherlands (Dutch Top 40) | 85 |
| Netherlands (Single Top 100) | 63 |

== Release history ==
| Region | Date | Format | Version | Label | Ref. |
|---|---|---|---|---|---|
| Netherlands | 27 March 2008 | Digital download; streaming | Remixes EP | Doorn Records | |
| North America | 27 March 2008 | Digital download; streaming | Remixes EP | Ultra Records | |
| United Kingdom | 7 April 2008 | Digital download; streaming | SIngle | Monkey Puzzle Records | |
| United Kingdom | 21 April 2008 | CD single | SIngle | Monkey Puzzle Records | |
| United Kingdom | 21 April 2008 | 12-inch vinyl | Remixes EP | Maelstrom Records | |
