= List of Billboard Adult Contemporary number ones of 2017 =

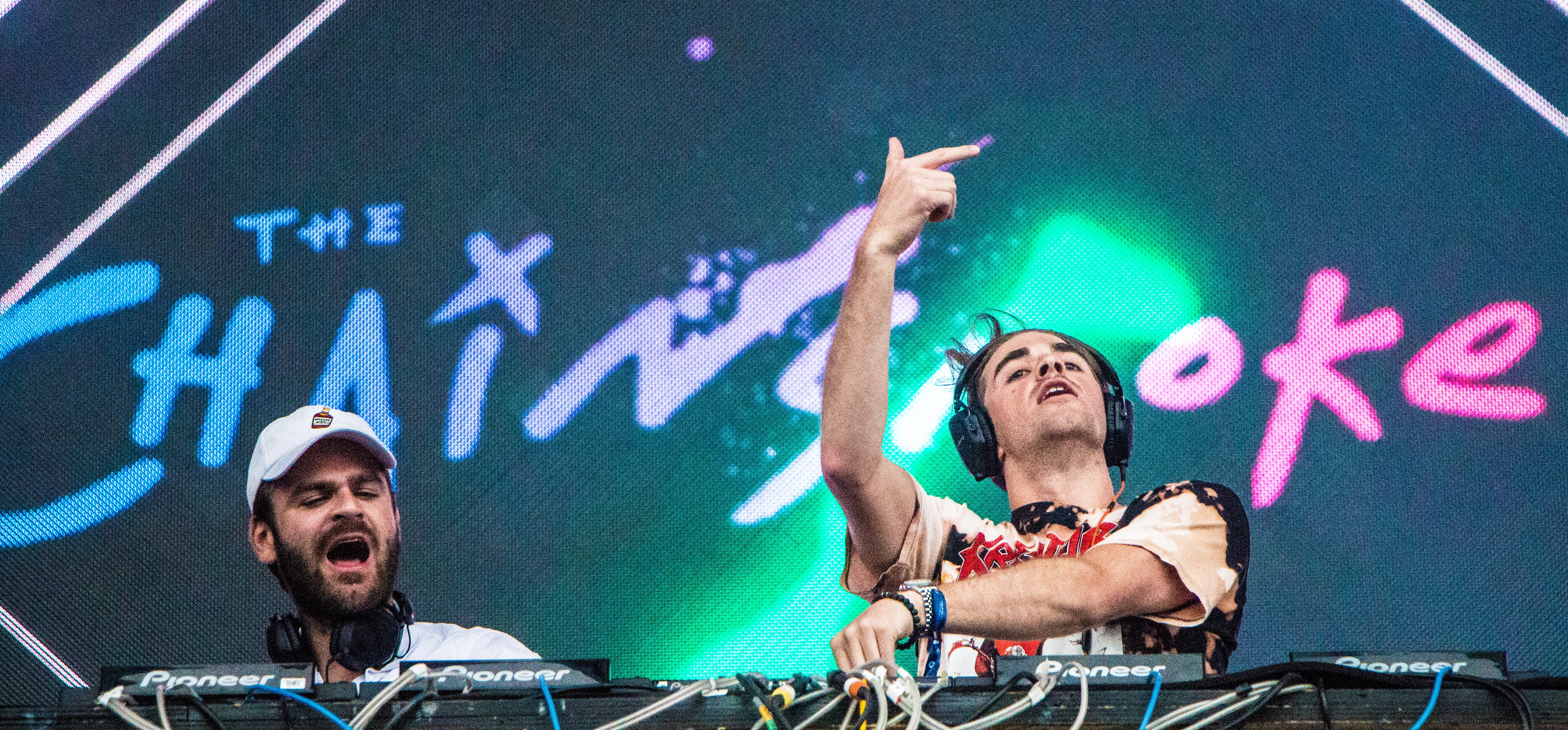
DJ/production duo the Chainsmokers topped the chart with "Something Just like This", a collaboration with the band Coldplay.

Adult Contemporary is a chart published by Billboard ranking the top-performing songs in the United States in the adult contemporary music (AC) market. In 2017, 11 different songs topped the chart in 52 issues of the magazine, based on weekly airplay data from radio stations compiled by Nielsen Broadcast Data Systems.

In the first issue of Billboard of 2017 singers Brett Eldredge and Meghan Trainor moved up to number one with their version of "Baby, It's Cold Outside", displacing another festive song, "This Christmas" by the band Train. The following week, as the chart began to reflect post-Christmas airplay, Eldredge and Trainor's song dropped all the way to number 30, the chart's lowest position, and was replaced in the top spot by Adele's song "Send My Love (To Your New Lover)". In the issue dated February 25, Justin Timberlake's song "Can't Stop the Feeling!" regained the top spot more than nine months after it first entered the chart, in its 41st week on the listing. The song, taken from the soundtrack of the film Trolls, had been one of the biggest hits of 2016, topping both the AC chart and Billboard's all-genre chart, the Hot 100. In January 2017 it was nominated for the Academy Award for Best Original Song, and shortly after it regained the number one position on the Adult Contemporary listing Timberlake performed the song at the 89th Academy Awards ceremony.

In early May, British singer Ed Sheeran's song "Shape of You" reached number one, a position which it went on to hold for more than five months without interruption. The track's total of 24 weeks atop the chart was the second-longest run by a song at number one on the AC listing to date, behind only Uncle Kracker's 2003 recording of "Drift Away", which spent 28 weeks in the top spot. "Shape of You" was the biggest-selling song of the year in the United States, and topped the Hot 100, as well as a number of genre-specific charts ranging from Adult Contemporary to Dance Club Songs. It was finally displaced from the top of the Adult Contemporary chart in the issue of Billboard dated October 21 by "Something Just Like This", a collaboration between American DJ/production duo the Chainsmokers and British band Coldplay, another example of a song that achieved success in both the Adult Contemporary and dance music markets. Having started with a festive song at number one, the year ended with another in the top spot, as Australian singer Sia topped the chart for the final two weeks of the year with her song "Santa's Coming for Us".

== Chart history ==
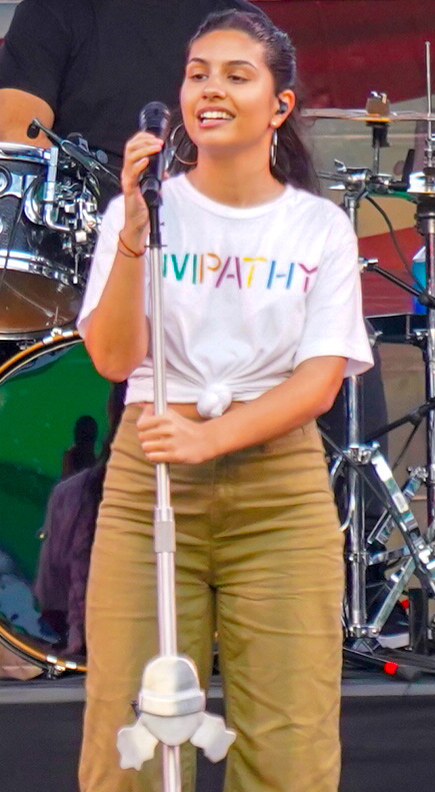
"Scars to Your Beautiful" was a chart-topper for Canadian singer Alessia Cara.

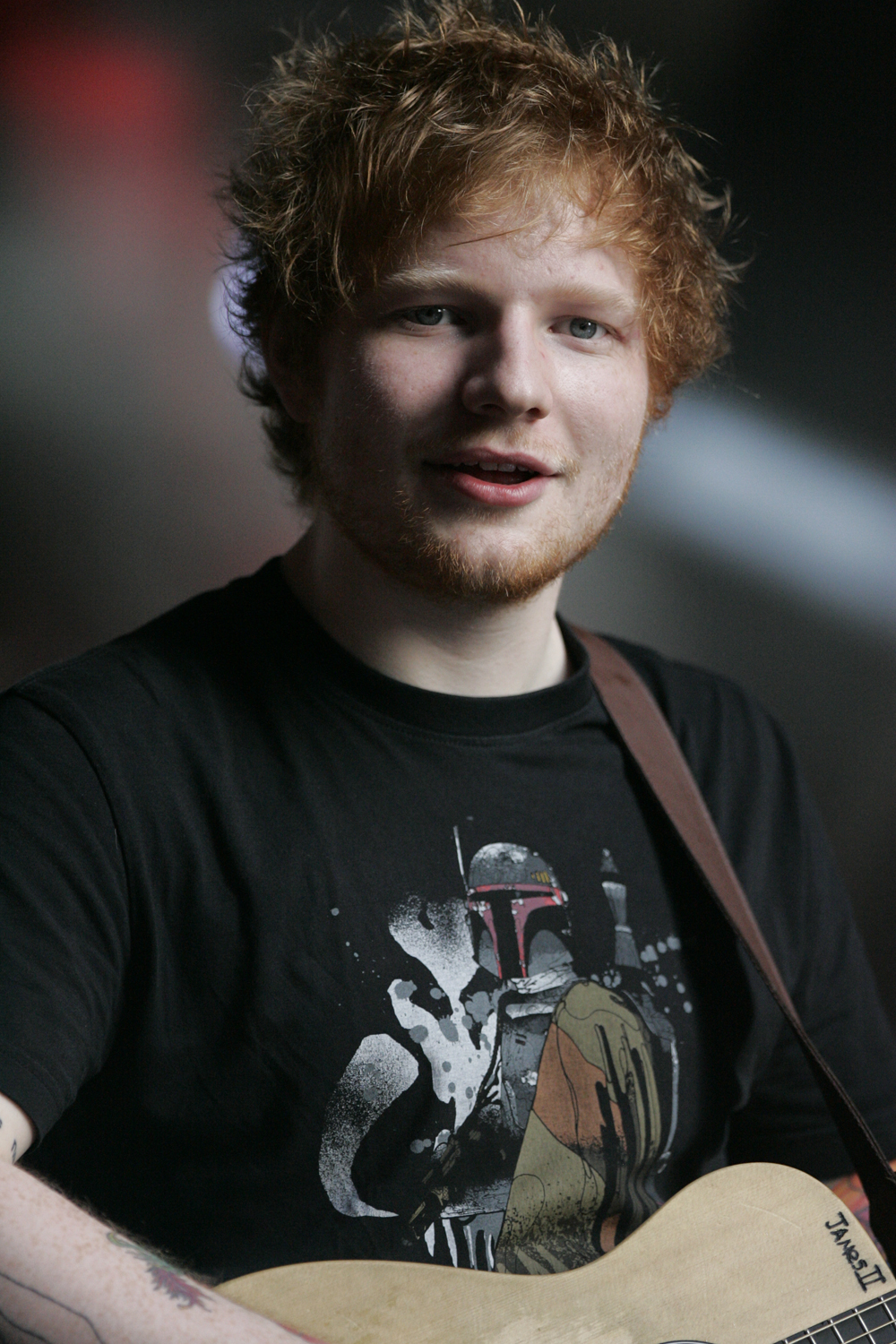
"Shape of You" by Ed Sheeran held the top spot for 24 consecutive weeks.

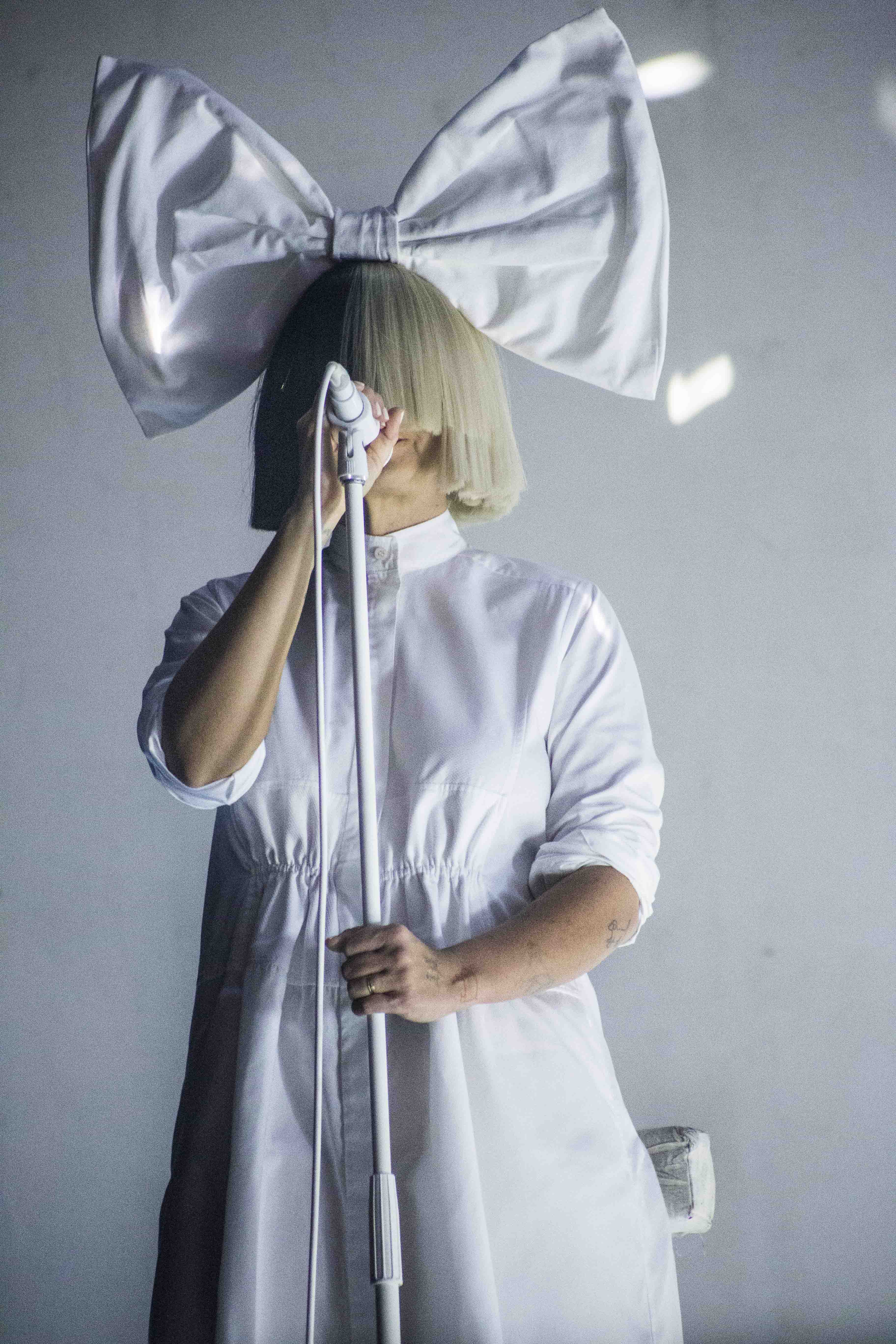
Sia ended the year at number one with "Santa's Coming for Us".

Key
†	Indicates best-performing AC song of 2017

Issue date	Title	Artist(s)	Ref.
January 7	"Baby, It's Cold Outside"	Brett Eldredge featuring Meghan Trainor	
January 14	"Send My Love (To Your New Lover)"	Adele	
January 21	"Just Like Fire"	Pink	
January 28	"Just Like Fire"	Pink	
February 4	"Just Like Fire"	Pink	
February 11	"Treat You Better"	Shawn Mendes	
February 18	"Treat You Better"	Shawn Mendes	
February 25	"Can't Stop the Feeling!"	Justin Timberlake	
March 4	"Can't Stop the Feeling!"	Justin Timberlake	
March 11	"Can't Stop the Feeling!"	Justin Timberlake	
March 18	"Don't Wanna Know" †	Maroon 5	
March 25	"Don't Wanna Know" †	Maroon 5	
April 1	"Don't Wanna Know" †	Maroon 5	
April 8	"Don't Wanna Know" †	Maroon 5	
April 15	"Don't Wanna Know" †	Maroon 5	
April 22	"Scars to Your Beautiful"	Alessia Cara	
April 29	"Scars to Your Beautiful"	Alessia Cara	
May 6	"Shape of You"	Ed Sheeran	
May 13	"Shape of You"	Ed Sheeran	
May 20	"Shape of You"	Ed Sheeran	
May 27	"Shape of You"	Ed Sheeran	
June 3	"Shape of You"	Ed Sheeran	
June 10	"Shape of You"	Ed Sheeran	
June 17	"Shape of You"	Ed Sheeran	
June 24	"Shape of You"	Ed Sheeran	
July 1	"Shape of You"	Ed Sheeran	
July 8	"Shape of You"	Ed Sheeran	
July 15	"Shape of You"	Ed Sheeran	
July 22	"Shape of You"	Ed Sheeran	
July 29	"Shape of You"	Ed Sheeran	
August 5	"Shape of You"	Ed Sheeran	
August 12	"Shape of You"	Ed Sheeran	
August 19	"Shape of You"	Ed Sheeran	
August 26	"Shape of You"	Ed Sheeran	
September 2	"Shape of You"	Ed Sheeran	
September 9	"Shape of You"	Ed Sheeran	
September 16	"Shape of You"	Ed Sheeran	
September 23	"Shape of You"	Ed Sheeran	
September 30	"Shape of You"	Ed Sheeran	
October 7	"Shape of You"	Ed Sheeran	
October 14	"Shape of You"	Ed Sheeran	
October 21	"Something Just Like This"	The Chainsmokers & Coldplay	
October 28	"Something Just Like This"	The Chainsmokers & Coldplay	
November 4	"Something Just Like This"	The Chainsmokers & Coldplay	
November 11	"Something Just Like This"	The Chainsmokers & Coldplay	
November 18	"There's Nothing Holdin' Me Back"	Shawn Mendes	
November 25	"There's Nothing Holdin' Me Back"	Shawn Mendes	
December 2	"There's Nothing Holdin' Me Back"	Shawn Mendes	
December 9	"There's Nothing Holdin' Me Back"	Shawn Mendes	
December 16	"There's Nothing Holdin' Me Back"	Shawn Mendes	
December 23	"Santa's Coming for Us"	Sia	
December 30	"Santa's Coming for Us"	Sia	

== See also ==
- 2017 in American music
