= List of Billboard Adult Contemporary number ones of 2016 =

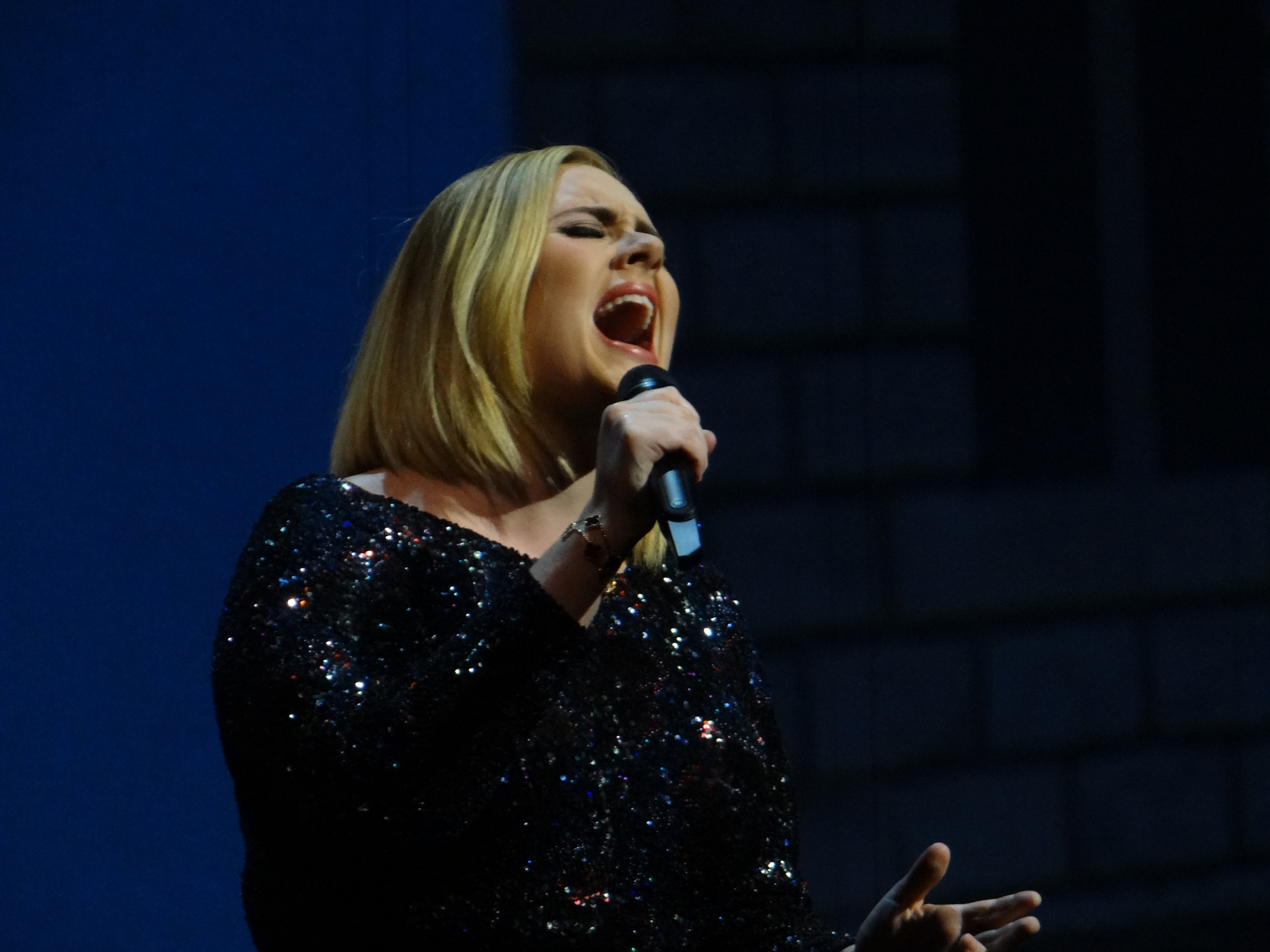
British singer Adele spent 16 weeks at number one with "Hello".

Adult Contemporary is a chart published by Billboard ranking the top-performing songs in the United States in the adult contemporary music (AC) market. In 2016, nine different songs topped the chart in 53 issues of the magazine, based on weekly airplay data from radio stations compiled by Nielsen Broadcast Data Systems.

On the first chart of the year, British musician Seal moved into the number one position with his version of the 1970 song "This Christmas", displacing "Hello" by Adele. The following week, "Hello" regained the top spot and held it for 16 consecutive weeks, the year's longest unbroken run atop the chart. Adele would return to number one for two weeks later in the year with "Send My Love (To Your New Lover)", and her total of 18 weeks in the top spot during 2016 was the most for any artist. She was the only act to take more than one song to the top of the AC listing during the year. In March, the BBC described Adele as the biggest star in pop music at the time.

From the issues of Billboard dated July 9 through November 26, the top spot was occupied by two songs from film soundtracks. Justin Timberlake spent 13 weeks at number one beginning in the July 9 issue with "Can't Stop the Feeling!" from the film Trolls, before Pink had a six-week run in the top spot with "Just like Fire", from Alice Through the Looking Glass. Timberlake's song returned to the top of the chart in November for two further weeks. It was the singer's first AC number one as a solo artist, although he had topped the listing 16 years earlier as a member of the group NSYNC with their song "This I Promise You". Having begun with one version of "This Christmas" atop the chart, 2016 ended with a different version of the song in the top position. The band Train took its version of the song to number one in the issue of Billboard dated December 17, yielded the top spot the following week to Josh Groban with his recording of "Have Yourself a Merry Little Christmas", but returned to number one in the final issue of the year. The two songs continued a trend of Christmas-themed songs topping the AC chart at the end of the year, reflecting the fact that adult contemporary radio stations usually switch to playing exclusively festive songs in December.

== Chart history ==
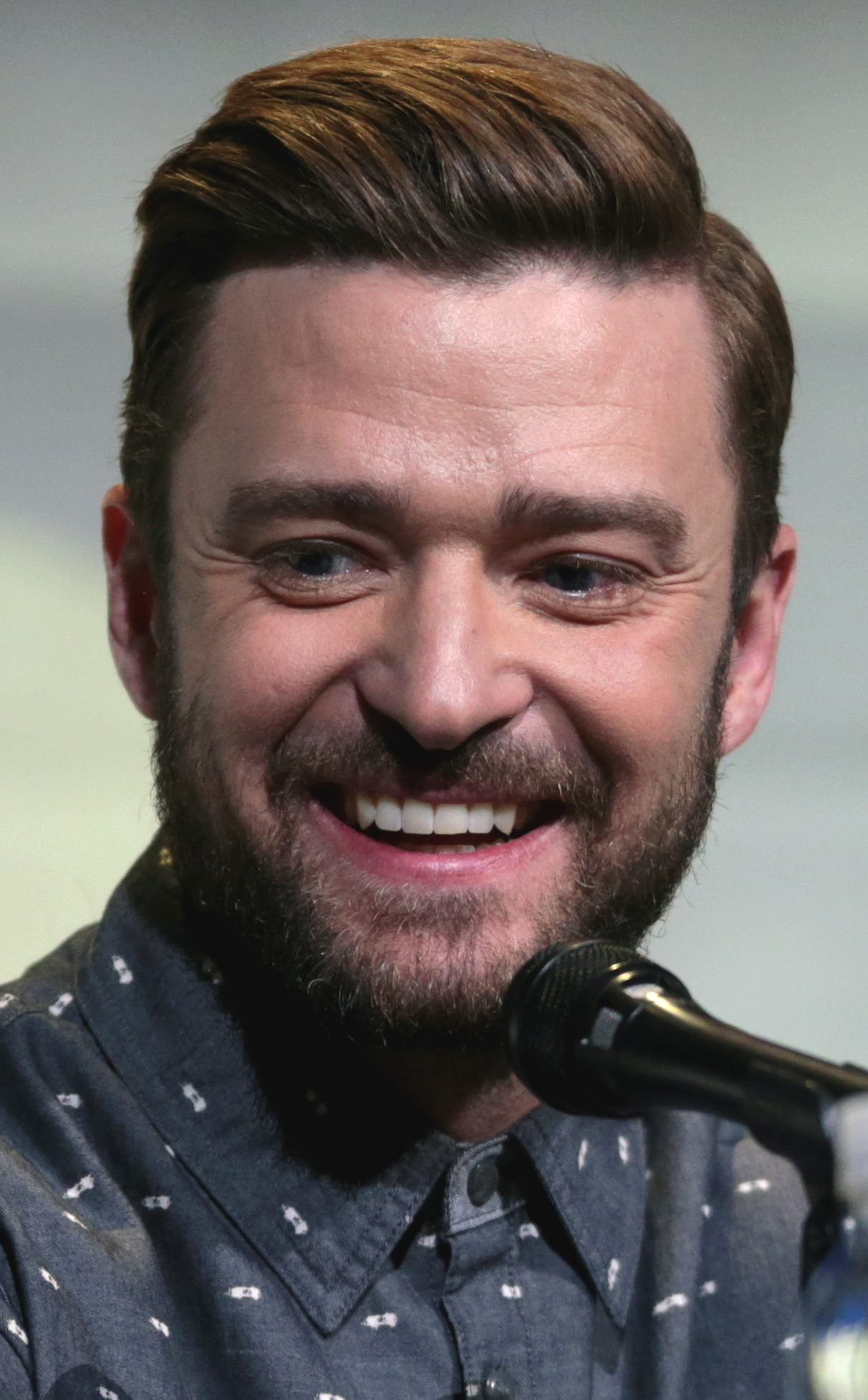
Justin Timberlake spent 15 non-consecutive weeks in the top spot with "Can't Stop the Feeling!".

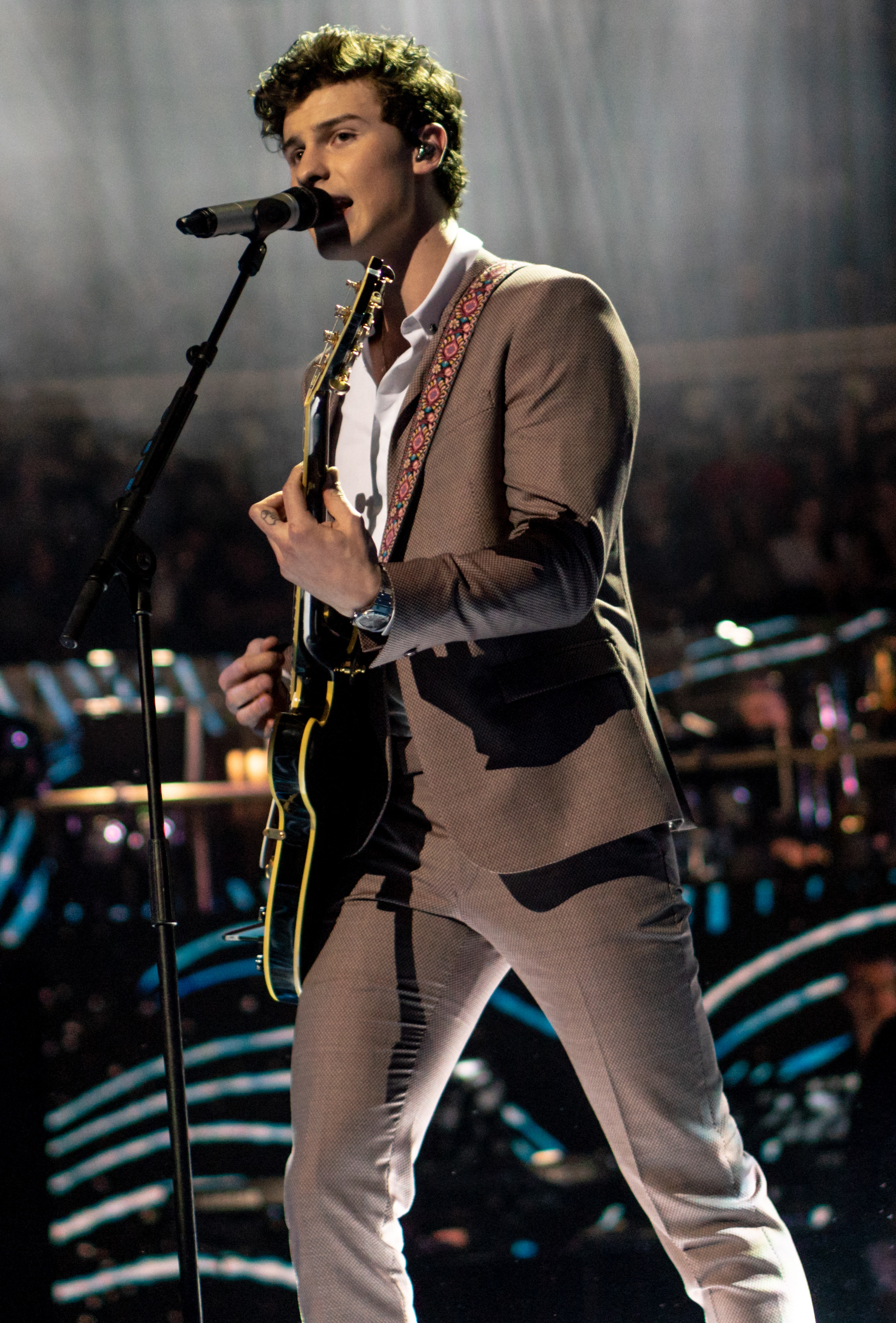
"Stitches" was a chart-topper for Canadian singer Shawn Mendes.

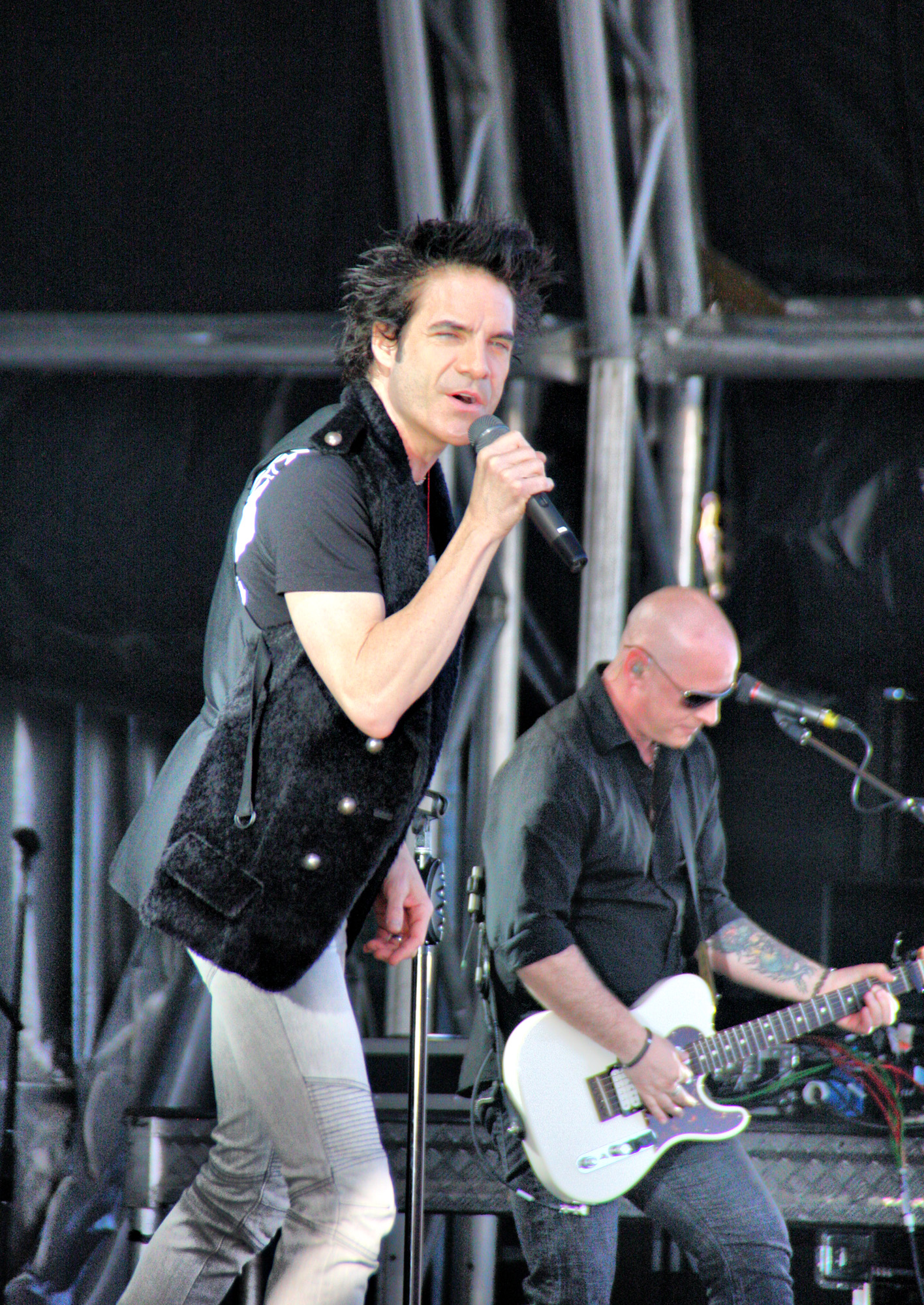
The band Train ended the year at number one with their version of "This Christmas". The year had begun with Seal's version of the same song atop the chart.

Key
†	Indicates best-performing AC song of 2016

Issue date	Title	Artist(s)	Ref.
January 2	"This Christmas"	Seal	
January 9	"Hello"	Adele	
January 16	"Hello"	Adele	
January 23	"Hello"	Adele	
January 30	"Hello"	Adele	
February 6	"Hello"	Adele	
February 13	"Hello"	Adele	
February 20	"Hello"	Adele	
February 27	"Hello"	Adele	
March 5	"Hello"	Adele	
March 12	"Hello"	Adele	
March 19	"Hello"	Adele	
March 26	"Hello"	Adele	
April 2	"Hello"	Adele	
April 9	"Hello"	Adele	
April 16	"Hello"	Adele	
April 23	"Hello"	Adele	
April 30	"Stitches" †	Shawn Mendes	
May 7	"Stitches" †	Shawn Mendes	
May 14	"Love Yourself"	Justin Bieber	
May 21	"Love Yourself"	Justin Bieber	
May 28	"Love Yourself"	Justin Bieber	
June 4	"Love Yourself"	Justin Bieber	
June 11	"Love Yourself"	Justin Bieber	
June 18	"Love Yourself"	Justin Bieber	
June 25	"Love Yourself"	Justin Bieber	
July 2	"Love Yourself"	Justin Bieber	
July 9	"Can't Stop the Feeling!"	Justin Timberlake	
July 16	"Can't Stop the Feeling!"	Justin Timberlake	
July 23	"Can't Stop the Feeling!"	Justin Timberlake	
July 30	"Can't Stop the Feeling!"	Justin Timberlake	
August 6	"Can't Stop the Feeling!"	Justin Timberlake	
August 13	"Can't Stop the Feeling!"	Justin Timberlake	
August 20	"Can't Stop the Feeling!"	Justin Timberlake	
August 27	"Can't Stop the Feeling!"	Justin Timberlake	
September 3	"Can't Stop the Feeling!"	Justin Timberlake	
September 10	"Can't Stop the Feeling!"	Justin Timberlake	
September 17	"Can't Stop the Feeling!"	Justin Timberlake	
September 24	"Can't Stop the Feeling!"	Justin Timberlake	
October 1	"Can't Stop the Feeling!"	Justin Timberlake	
October 8	"Just like Fire"	Pink	
October 15	"Just like Fire"	Pink	
October 22	"Just like Fire"	Pink	
October 29	"Just like Fire"	Pink	
November 5	"Just like Fire"	Pink	
November 12	"Just like Fire"	Pink	
November 19	"Can't Stop the Feeling!"	Justin Timberlake	
November 26	"Can't Stop the Feeling!"	Justin Timberlake	
December 3	"Send My Love (To Your New Lover)"	Adele	
December 10	"Send My Love (To Your New Lover)"	Adele	
December 17	"This Christmas"	Train	
December 24	"Have Yourself a Merry Little Christmas"	Josh Groban	
December 31	"This Christmas"	Train	

== See also ==
- 2016 in American music
