= Soul Christmas =

Compilation album by various artists
- Released: November 1968
- Genre: Christmas; soul; funk
- Label: Atco; Atlantic

Singles from Christmas
- 1. "Gee Whiz, It's Christmas" Released: 1963; 2. "Presents For Christmas" Released: 1966; 3. "Jingle Bells" Released: 1966; 4. "Silver Bells" Released: 1967; 5. "I'll Make Every Day Christmas (For My Woman)" Released: 1967; 6. "Every Day Will Be Like A Holiday" Released: 1967; 7. "Back Door Santa" Released: 1968; 8. "The Christmas Song" / "What Are You Doing New Year's Eve" Released: 1968; 9. "White Christmas" / "Merry Christmas Baby" Released: 1968

Soul Christmas is a 1968 collection of Christmas songs produced by Atco Records. The album contains new and previously recorded tracks, some originally released on Stax Records. Soul Christmas reached number 13 on Billboard's Best Bets for Christmas in 1968, and number 8 in both 1969 and 1970. The CD version, with three additional tracks, reached number 89 on their Top R&B Albums chart in 1994.

== Original track listing ==
| No. | Title | Artist | Length |
|---|---|---|---|
| 1. | "Back Door Santa" (Christmas chart #4) | Clarence Carter | 2:08 |
| 2. | "The Christmas Song" | King Curtis with Duane Allman | 2:55 |
| 3. | "White Christmas" (Christmas chart #12) | Otis Redding with Booker T. & the M.G.'s | 3:06 |
| 4. | "I'll Make Every Day Christmas (For My Woman)" (Christmas chart #15) | Joe Tex | 3:04 |
| 5. | "Silver Bells" (from their album In the Christmas Spirit) | Booker T. & the M.G.'s | 2:28 |
| 6. | "Gee Whiz It’s Christmas" (Christmas chart #23) | Carla Thomas with Vinny Trauth | 2:40 |
| 7. | "Merry Christmas Baby" (Christmas chart #9) | Otis Redding with Booker T. & The MG's | 2:30 |
| 8. | "Presents For Christmas" | Solomon Burke | 2:40 |
| 9. | "Jingle Bells" (Christmas chart #20) | Booker T. and The MG's | 2:32 |
| 10. | "Every Day Will Be Like A Holiday" (Christmas chart #33) | William Bell | 2:35 |
| 11. | "What Are You Doing New Year's Eve?" | King Curtis with Duane Allman | 3:20 |
| Total length: | | | 29:58 |

== Critical reception ==
Randy Anthony on the site Hip Christmas says "the magic of 60's soul music – the gospel intensity, the ribald humor, the sensual conviction – comes to bear with its most powerful alchemy on Soul Christmas . . . All in all, Soul Christmas is a classic of both genres – soul and Christmas – one that belongs in the collection of anyone who claims to know anything about either. The most amazing aspect of Soul Christmas is that these songs are among the very best that these artists – all giants of soul – ever recorded."

== Reissues ==
There are several variations on this collection. The 1994 Rhino Records CD reissue adds three bonus tracks, including the original 1963 version of Carla Thomas' "All I Want For Christmas Is You" (the b-side to her "Gee Whiz, It's Christmas") and Ray Charles' "Christmas Time." Rhino also appends "Original" to this title in an attempt to avoid confusion with 1991's Soul Christmas. That disc, another Atlantic/Atco compilation, expands the scope of the original LP featuring 20 tracks spanning more than 20 years, including several songs from the out-of-print Cotillion Records LP, Funky Christmas (1976). Also included is Carla Thomas' 1966 version of the aforementioned "All I Want For Christmas Is You."

=== 1991 ===
Soul Christmas (1991)
| No. | Title | Writer(s) | Artist | Length |
|---|---|---|---|---|
| 1. | "White Christmas" | Irving Berlin | Clyde McPhatter & The Drifters | 2:38 |
| 2. | "This Christmas" | Donny Hathaway; Nadine McKinner | Donny Hathaway | 3:31 |
| 3. | "Gee Whiz, It's Christmas" | Carla Thomas; Steve Cropper | Carla Thomas | 2:41 |
| 4. | "Back Door Santa" | Clarence Carter; Marcus Daniel | Clarence Carter | 2:07 |
| 5. | "Merry Christmas Baby" | Lou Baxter; Johnny Moore | Booker T. & The MG's | 3:13 |
| 6. | "Silent Night" | Franz Xaver Gruber; Joseph Mohr | The Impressions | 3:57 |
| 7. | "May Christmas Bring You Happiness" | Luther Vandross | Luther | 4:26 |
| 8. | "White Christmas" | Irving Berlin | Otis Redding | 3:06 |
| 9. | "I'll Make Every Day Christmas (For My Woman)" | Buddy Killen | Joe Tex | 3:29 |
| 10. | "Silver Bells" | Raymond B. Evans; Jay Livingstone | Booker T. & The MG's | 2:29 |
| 11. | "All I Want For Christmas Is You" | A.C. Williams | Carla Thomas | 2:51 |
| 12. | "The Christmas Song" | Mel Tormé; Robert Wells | The Drifters | 2:28 |
| 13. | "Merry Christmas Baby" | Lou Baxter; Johnny Moore | Otis Redding | 2:32 |
| 14. | "Soul Santa" | Gerald Deas; Marcus Daniel | Brook Benton | 3:22 |
| 15. | "Every Day Will Be Like A Holiday" | Booker T. Jones; William Bell | The Sweet Inspirations | 2:28 |
| 16. | "Christmas Gift" | Lamont Dozier | Margie Joseph | 3:26 |
| 17. | "Presents For Christmas" | Dolores Burke; Solomon Burke; Solomon Burke, Jr; Hugh Martin | Solomon Burke | 3:11 |
| 18. | "New Year's Resolution" | Frank Loesser | Otis & Carla | 3:20 |
| 19. | "What Are You Doing New Year's Eve" | Frank Loesser | King Curtis | 3:39 |
| 20. | "May Christmas Bring You Happiness 1991 Remix" | Luther Vandross | Luther | 5:15 |
| Total length: | | | | 64:09 |

Some international releases contain Aretha Franklin's "Amazing Grace" as a bonus track.

=== 1994 ===
Original Soul Christmas (1994)
| No. | Title | Writer(s) | Producer(s) | Length |
|---|---|---|---|---|
| 1. | "Back Door Santa" (Clarence Carter) | Clarence Carter, Marcus Daniel | Rick Hall | 2:10 |
| 2. | "The Christmas Song" (King Curtis) | Mel Tormé; Robert Wells | Tom Dowd | 3:11 |
| 3. | "White Christmas" (Otis Redding) | Irving Berlin | Stax Staff | 3:09 |
| 4. | "I'll Make Every Day Christmas (For My Woman)" (Joe Tex) | Buddy Killen | Joe Tex | 3:32 |
| 5. | "Silver Bells" (Booker T. & The MG's) | Raymond B. Evans; Jay Livingstone | Jim Stewart | 2:33 |
| 6. | "Gee Whiz, It's Christmas" (Carla Thomas) | Carla Thomas; Steve Cropper | Carla Thomas | 2:47 |
| 7. | "Merry Christmas Baby" (Otis Redding) | Lou Baxter; Johnny Moore | Stax Staff | 2:34 |
| 8. | "Presents For Christmas" (Solomon Burke) | Dolores Burke; Solomon Burke; Solomon Burke, Jr; Hugh Martin | Bob Gallo | 3:13 |
| 9. | "Jingle Bells" (Booker T. & The MG's) | James Lord Pierpont | Jim Stewart | 2:38 |
| 10. | "Every Day Will Be Like A Holiday" (William Bell) | Booker T. Jones; William Bell | Booker T. Jones | 2:40 |
| 11. | "What Are You Doing New Year's Eve" (King Curtis) | Frank Loesser | Tom Dowd | 3:45 |
| 12. | "All I Want For Christmas Is You" (Carla Thomas) | A.C. Williams | Jim Stewart | 1:45 |
| 13. | "Christmas Time" (Ray Charles) | Sayde Shepard | Ray Charles | 4:31 |
| 14. | "Santa Claus Is Coming To Town" (Booker T. & The MG's) | Haven Gillespie; J. Fred Coots | Jim Stewart | 2:35 |
| Total length: | | | | 41:03 |

Some international releases contain Aretha Franklin's "Amazing Grace" and "Wholy Holy" as bonus tracks.
