= Snowman (Sia song) =

- Slowed Down & Snowed In remix artwork

Single by Sia

from the album Everyday Is Christmas
- Released: 9 November 2017
- Studio: Echo Studios (Los Angeles, CA)
- Genre: Christmas
- Length: 2:45
- Label: Monkey Puzzle; Atlantic
- Songwriters: Sia Furler; Greg Kurstin
- Producer: Greg Kurstin

Sia singles chronology
"Santa's Coming for Us" (2017)	"Snowman" (2017)	"Helium" (2018)

Belinda singles chronology
"Canción Para Regresar" (2025)	"Snowman" (Remix) (2025)

Music video
- "Snowman" on YouTube "Snowman - Part II" on YouTube

Audio video
- "Snowman (Remix)" on YouTube

"Snowman" is a song by Australian singer-songwriter Sia. It was released on 9 November 2017, as the second single from Sia's eighth studio album, Everyday Is Christmas. A music video made via claymation was released on 30 October 2020. A part two of the music video was released on 22 December 2022.

"Snowman" earned positive reviews from critics, some of whom deemed it the highlight single from Everyday Is Christmas. The song experienced a popularity surge in November 2020 on TikTok, and has since been branded as a modern-day Christmas classic. A remix version of "Snowman" was released on 14 November 2025, featuring the Spanish-born Mexican singer Belinda. A German-language adaptation of the song "Schneemann" was released on 15 November 2025, sung by Vanessa Mai.

== Composition ==
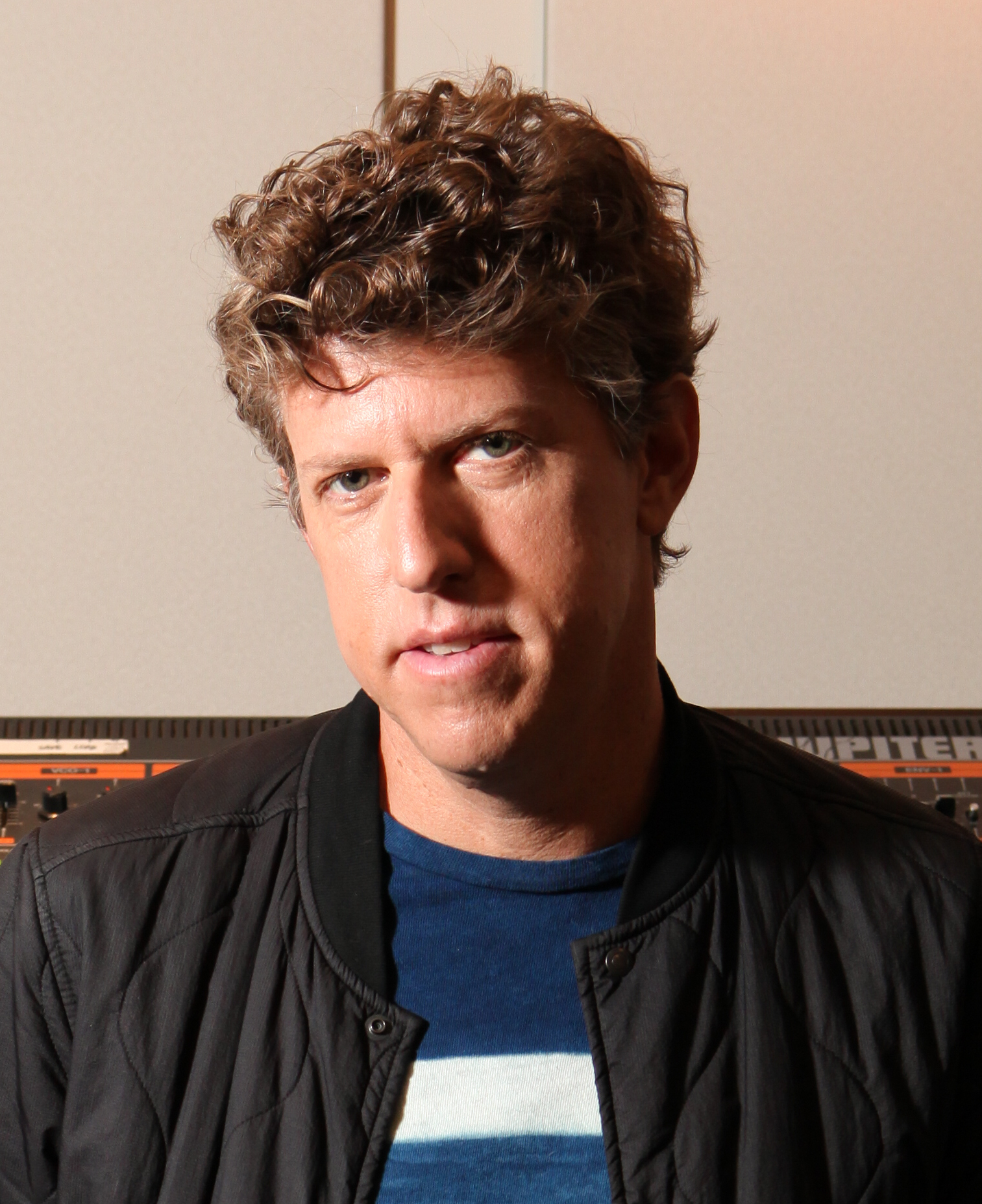
The song's co-writer Greg Kurstin in 2017

"Snowman" was written by Sia and frequent collaborator Greg Kurstin. Written in the key of D♭ major, Sia's vocals span one octave and a semitone from F_{3} to G♭_{4.} Production on the track was handled solely by Kurstin. The song is a midtempo, 60's-inspired, piano-driven, crisp, swaying ballad over which Sia's vocals, described as "calm but energetic" by mxdwn, tell a snowman not to cry as he will melt. The track runs for a length of 2 minutes and 45 seconds.

== Release and promotion ==
"Snowman" was announced on Sia's social media accounts on 7 November 2017, and was released for digital download and streaming on 9 November 2017 as the second single from Everyday Is Christmas. Sia performed "Snowman" on The Ellen DeGeneres Show, and on the finale of the fifteenth season of American reality TV series The Voice.

In December 2020, a challenge based around the song on video-sharing app TikTok saw a massive rise in popularity, becoming a trend. The challenge sees TikTok users attempt to sing a portion of the song, lasting forty seconds, in one breath. Sia subsequently released a "Snowed In & Slowed Down Remix" of the track, which was later featured on the Snowman Deluxe Edition of Everyday is Christmas on 5 November 2021. In addition to this, a sped-up version was included on the 2022 reissue of the album.

=== Music videos ===
On 30 October 2020, a claymation music video for "Snowman", directed by Lior Molcho, premiered on YouTube. On 22 December 2022, a "Part II" of the video was released, also directed by Molcho.

== Reception ==
Slant Magazine described the song as a "clever ode to fleeting romance". Slate named it the best song on Everyday Is Christmas, noting it "[takes] something we associate with winter and [applies] it to a universal theme." NME commented that the TikTok remix version of the song "opts for a breezier tempo than the original, with Sia changing the song’s key midway through for extra effect."

The song has also been included in lists of the best Christmas songs of all-time published by The Athletic, Esquire, Cosmopolitan, and was described by Billboard in 2022 as a "modern seasonal classic".

== Commercial performance ==
Upon its initial release in 2017, "Snowman" debuted and peaked at number 3 on the Billboard Holiday Digital Songs Sales chart dated 2 December 2017. Since its rise in popularity in 2020, the track has reached the top 10 various markets, including Germany, Switzerland, the Netherlands, and Sweden. It also reached the top 20 in Australia and Canada, among others, and peaked at number 15 on the Billboard Global 200 in 2023. In 2021, it reached number 1 on the Finnish Singles Chart, becoming Sia's first chart-topping hit in the country. In the same year, it topped the Norwegian Singles Chart for two weeks and returned to number 1 in 2022 and 2023. "Snowman" entered the Billboard Hot 100 singles chart for the first time on the week ending 4 January 2025 at number 43, over seven years after its first entry on a Billboard chart.

As of December 2025, "Snowman" was one of the 10 most-streamed Christmas songs of all-time on streaming platform Spotify.

== Credits and personnel ==
Credits adapted from Tidal.

- Sia Furler – songwriter, vocals
- Greg Kurstin – songwriter, producer, bass, drums, keyboards, piano, engineer
- Alex Pasco – engineer
- Julian Burg – engineer
- Şerban Ghenea – mixer
- John Hanes – mixing engineer
- Chris Gehringer – mastering engineer

== Charts ==
=== Weekly charts ===
Weekly chart performance for "Snowman"
Chart (2017–2026)	Peak position
Australia (ARIA)	11
Austria (Ö3 Austria Top 40)	4
Belgium (Ultratop 50 Flanders)	19
Belgium (Ultratop 50 Wallonia)	10
Canada Hot 100 (Billboard)	13
CIS Airplay (TopHit)	167
CIS Airplay (TopHit) Version with Belinda	161
Croatia (Billboard)	8
Croatia International Airplay (Top lista)	33
Czech Republic Singles Digital (ČNS IFPI)	5
Denmark (Tracklisten)	17
Estonia Airplay (TopHit)	21
Estonia Airplay (TopHit) Version with Belinda	19
Finland (Suomen virallinen lista)	1
France (SNEP)	5
Germany (GfK)	6
Global 200 (Billboard)	11
Greece International Streaming (IFPI)	5
Hong Kong (Billboard)	20
Hungary (Single Top 40)	4
Hungary (Stream Top 40)	9
Iceland (Tónlistinn)	15
Ireland (IRMA)	13
Italy (FIMI)	12
Latvia Streaming (LaIPA)	4
Lithuania (AGATA)	2
Luxembourg (Billboard)	5
Malaysia Streaming (RIM)	3
Netherlands (Single Top 100)	4
New Zealand (Recorded Music NZ)	11
Nicaragua Anglo Airplay (Monitor Latino) Version with Belinda	5
Norway (VG-lista)	1
Philippines (Philippines Hot 100)	52
Poland (Polish Airplay Top 100)	38
Poland (Polish Streaming Top 100)	3
Portugal (AFP)	23
Romania Airplay (TopHit)	119
Romania Airplay (TopHit) Version with Belinda	140
Romania (Billboard)	11
Singapore Streaming (RIAS)	12
Slovakia Singles Digital (ČNS IFPI)	3
South Korea (Circle)	10
Spain (PROMUSICAE)	42
Sweden (Sverigetopplistan)	5
Switzerland (Schweizer Hitparade)	4
United Arab Emirates Streaming (IFPI)	10
UK Singles (Official Charts)	18
US Billboard Hot 100	41
US Holiday 100 (Billboard)	31
Vietnam (Vietnam Hot 100)	18

=== Monthly charts ===
Monthly chart performance for "Snowman"
Chart (2024)	Peak position
Estonia Airplay (TopHit)	63

Monthly chart performance for "Snowman" (Version with Belinda)
Chart (2025)	Peak position
Estonia Airplay (TopHit)	32

=== Year-end charts ===
Year-end chart performance for "Snowman"
Chart (2021)	Position
Hungary (Stream Top 40)	92
South Korea (Gaon)	123
Chart (2022)	Position
South Korea (Circle)	124
Chart (2023)	Position
Hungary (Single Top 40)	47
South Korea (Circle)	140
Chart (2024)	Position
Austria (Ö3 Austria Top 40)	58
Germany (GfK)	90
South Korea (Circle)	190
Switzerland (Schweizer Hitparade)	93
Chart (2025)	Position
Germany (GfK)	94
Switzerland (Schweizer Hitparade)	86

== Certifications ==
Certifications for "Snowman"
Region	Certification	Certified units/sales
Denmark (IFPI Danmark)	2× Platinum	180,000^{‡}
France (SNEP)	Diamond	333,333^{‡}
Germany (BVMI)	Platinum	600,000^{‡}
Italy (FIMI)	Platinum	100,000^{‡}
New Zealand (RMNZ)	2× Platinum	60,000^{‡}
Poland (ZPAV)	4× Platinum	200,000^{‡}
Portugal (AFP)	Platinum	10,000^{‡}
Spain (Promusicae)	Platinum	60,000^{‡}
United Kingdom (BPI)	2× Platinum	1,200,000^{‡}
United States (RIAA)	2× Platinum	2,000,000^{‡}
Streaming
Greece (IFPI Greece)	Platinum	2,000,000^{†}
^{‡} Sales+streaming figures based on certification alone.^{†} Streaming-only figures based on certification alone.

== Release history ==
Release history for "Snowman"
Region	Date	Format	Version	Label(s)	Ref.
Various	9 November 2017	Digital download; streaming	Original	Monkey Puzzle; Atlantic	
Various	9 December 2020	Video streaming	Snowed In & Slowed Down TikTok Remix	Monkey Puzzle; Atlantic	
Various	29 October 2021	Digital download; streaming	Snowed In & Slowed Down TikTok Remix	Monkey Puzzle; Atlantic	
Various	14 November 2025	Digital download; streaming	Remix featuring Belinda	Monkey Puzzle; Atlantic	
