= Just Like Fire =

Single by Pink

from the album Alice Through the Looking Glass: Original Motion Picture Soundtrack
- Released: April 15, 2016
- Genre: Pop
- Length: 3:35
- Label: RCA; Walt Disney
- Songwriters: Alecia Moore; Max Martin; Karl Johan Schuster; Oscar Holter
- Producers: Max Martin; Shellback; Oscar Holter

Pink singles chronology
"Today's the Day" (2015)	"Just Like Fire" (2016)	"Setting the World on Fire" (2016)

Music video
- "Just Like Fire" on YouTube

"Just Like Fire" is a song recorded by American singer Pink for the soundtrack to the 2016 film Alice Through the Looking Glass. It was written by Pink along with Max Martin, Shellback, and Oscar Holter, who all serve as producers on the track. The song was released to digital retailers through RCA Records on April 15, 2016, and was serviced to American adult pop radio through RCA and Walt Disney Records on April 18, 2016.

Upon its release, "Just Like Fire" debuted in the top 50 on multiple international singles charts, and has peaked in the top 10 in the United States. In Australia, it reached number one in its second week and has also been certified four Platinum by ARIA.

It was nominated for the Grammy Award for Best Song Written for Visual Media at the 59th Annual Grammy Awards but lost to Justin Timberlake's "Can't Stop the Feeling!" (2016), also produced by Martin and Shellback.

== Composition ==
"Just Like Fire" was written by Pink, Max Martin, Shellback, and Oscar Holter. The trio was also responsible for the song's production. The song has been praised for maintaining Pink's signature sound, but also covering new ground stylistically, including a rap-style breakdown. In an interview with People, Pink claimed that her daughter was the inspiration for the track. The song marks the first occasion that the singer has written an original song for a live action feature film.

The song has a running time of 3 minutes and 35 seconds and is performed in the key of E minor with a tempo of 82 beats per minute in common time. It follows a chord progression of Em–G–C–Am, and Pink's vocals span from E_{3} to G_{5}.

== Release ==
Ahead of the track's April 15, 2016, premiere date, Pink uploaded a preview picture, suspected to be from the song's music video, to her Instagram account. It featured the singer snarling at the camera while wearing a black lace outfit with a thorn-inspired black headpiece. The image was captioned, "Let's do this #justlikefire". The following day, the song was released to digital retailers. Following the initial release, Pink topped the Billboard + Twitter Trending 140 chart, which measures the acceleration of conversation around artists and their music.

== Chart performance ==
In the United States, "Just Like Fire" received 798 and 565 plays on contemporary hit radio and hot adult contemporary radio, respectively, on its first day of availability (April 15, 2016). After the official add dates (April 19, 2016, for CHR and April 18, 2016, for Hot AC), "Just Like Fire" ranked as the most-added song at Hot AC radio with 62 Mediabase-monitored stations, more than double the amount of the second-most-added song. The song resultantly debuted at 38 and 27, respectively, on the Billboard Pop Songs and Adult Pop Songs charts dated April 30, 2016. "Just Like Fire" entered the Billboard Hot 100 at number 42 on the chart dated May 7, 2016. It has since peaked at number 10, becoming her first top 10 single since "Just Give Me a Reason" reached number one in April 2013.

The song also performed well internationally, reaching the top 10 in Australia, Hungary, and Scotland. "Just Like Fire" saw its greatest commercial success in Australia, where it debuted at number 2 on the ARIA Singles Chart. The following week, the song rose to number one, giving Pink her eighth Australian No. 1, and was also certified Gold by ARIA. It has since been certified quadruple Platinum. In Canada, the song entered the Billboard Canadian Hot 100 at number 35 on the chart dated May 7, 2016.

== Live performance ==
"Just Like Fire" made its TV debut at the 2016 Billboard Music Awards on May 22, 2016, where Pink soared over the crowd through a series of acrobatic stunts. She performed the song a day later along with "White Rabbit" on Jimmy Kimmel Live!.

== Music video ==
The official video for "Just Like Fire" was directed by Dave Meyers and was released May 8, 2016, ahead of the US premiere of Alice Through the Looking Glass. The video features Pink's husband Carey Hart and their daughter. In it, Pink is observed swinging on silk ropes hung from the ceiling of a large drawing room by her husband. Her daughter, seated on a nearby fireplace mantle, watches as a blue butterfly flies into a mirror over the fireplace. Her daughter follows, stepping into the mirror. Shortly after, Pink swings on the ropes and leaps onto the mantle, stepping into the mirror as well. She arrives on a giant chessboard outside a castle. On the chessboard are doubles of Pink dressed as various chess pieces. The doubles circle Pink and the white queen shoves her over. She lands in a chair at a table set up for a tea party suspended in the air. Also seated around the table is the Mad Hatter and her daughter. The butterfly from the beginning flies around the table as Pink sings the song's bridge. Suddenly, she falls out of her chair and is shown falling through the sky, stopping inches off the ground in a rose garden. The Timekeeper from the film gives her daughter a watch in the background. Then, Pink begins hallucinating scenes from the film, her in a straitjacket, and scene from earlier in the video. It suddenly cuts to Pink in a straitjacket, being carted away into a lunatic asylum while her husband signs the release papers with a doctor, while the same butterfly follows her through the entrance.

== Track listing ==
Digital download

1. "Just Like Fire" (From Alice Through the Looking Glass) – 3:35

Wideboys remix

1. "Just Like Fire" (From Alice Through the Looking Glass) [Wideboys Remix] – 3:42

== Charts ==
=== Weekly charts ===
Weekly chart performance for "Just Like Fire"
Chart (2016–2017)	Peak position
Australia (ARIA)	1
Austria (Ö3 Austria Top 40)	16
Belgium (Ultratop 50 Flanders)	37
Belgium (Ultratip Bubbling Under Wallonia)	2
Canada Hot 100 (Billboard)	11
Canada AC (Billboard)	2
Canada CHR/Top 40 (Billboard)	7
Canada Hot AC (Billboard)	2
CIS Airplay (TopHit)	14
Croatia International Airplay (HRT)	3
Czech Republic Airplay (ČNS IFPI)	2
Czech Republic Singles Digital (ČNS IFPI)	27
Finland Airplay (Radiosoittolista)	71
France (SNEP)	37
France Airplay (SNEP)	15
Germany (GfK)	21
Germany (Airplay Chart)	2
Hungary (Rádiós Top 40)	6
Hungary (Single Top 40)	10
Ireland (IRMA)	23
Italy (FIMI)	86
Latvia (Latvijas Top 40)	31
Japan Hot 100 (Billboard)	20
Japan Hot Overseas (Billboard)	1
Netherlands (Dutch Top 40)	22
Netherlands (Single Top 100)	57
New Zealand (Recorded Music NZ)	11
Poland Airplay (ZPAV)	10
Russia Airplay (Tophit)	14
Scottish Singles Sales (Official Charts)	8
Slovakia Airplay (ČNS IFPI)	19
Slovenia (SloTop50)	7
Sweden (Sverigetopplistan)	85
Switzerland (Schweizer Hitparade)	33
UK Singles (Official Charts)	19
US Billboard Hot 100	10
US Adult Contemporary (Billboard)	1
US Adult Pop Airplay (Billboard)	2
US Dance Airplay (Billboard)	35
US Pop Airplay (Billboard)	7
US Kid Digital Songs (Billboard)	1

=== Year-end charts ===
2016 year-end chart performance for "Just Like Fire"
Chart (2016)	Position
Australia (ARIA)	25
Canada (Canadian Hot 100)	35
CIS (Tophit)	75
Croatia International Airplay (HRT)	47
Germany (Official German Charts)	100
Iceland (Plötutíóindi)	6
Hungary (Rádiós Top 40)	80
Hungary (Single Top 40)	77
Russia Airplay (Tophit)	84
Ukraine Airplay (Tophit)	40
UK Singles (Official Charts Company)	100
US Billboard Hot 100	33
US Adult Contemporary (Billboard)	9
US Adult Top 40 (Billboard)	3
US Mainstream Top 40 (Billboard)	33

2017 year-end chart performance for "Just Like Fire"
Chart (2017)	Position
US Adult Contemporary (Billboard)	13

== Certifications ==
Certifications for "Just Like Fire"
Region	Certification	Certified units/sales
Australia (ARIA)	6× Platinum	420,000^{‡}
Brazil (Pro-Música Brasil)	Platinum	60,000^{‡}
Canada (Music Canada)	Platinum	80,000^{*}
Denmark (IFPI Danmark)	Gold	45,000^{‡}
Germany (BVMI)	Gold	200,000^{‡}
Italy (FIMI)	Gold	25,000^{‡}
Mexico (AMPROFON)	Gold	30,000^{‡}
New Zealand (RMNZ)	2× Platinum	60,000^{‡}
Poland (ZPAV)	Platinum	50,000^{‡}
United Kingdom (BPI)	Platinum	600,000^{‡}
United States (RIAA)	Platinum	1,000,000
^{*} Sales figures based on certification alone.^{‡} Sales+streaming figures based on certification alone.

== Release history ==
Release dates and formats for "Just Like Fire"
Region	Date	Format	Label	Ref.
Worldwide	April 15, 2016	Digital download	RCA	
United States	April 18, 2016	Hot adult contemporary	RCA; Walt Disney	
United States	April 19, 2016	Contemporary hit radio	RCA; Walt Disney	
Italy	April 22, 2016	Contemporary hit radio	RCA; Walt Disney	

== See also ==
- List of number-one singles of 2016 (Australia)
- List of Billboard Adult Contemporary number ones of 2016 and 2017 (U.S.)
