= Back Door Santa =

Single by Clarence Carter
- B-side: "That Old Time Feeling"
- Released: 1968
- Genre: Funk, Christmas
- Length: 2:10
- Label: Atlantic
- Songwriters: Clarence Carter, Marcus Daniel
- Producer: Rick Hall

Clarence Carter singles chronology
"Too Weak to Fight" (1968)	"Back Door Santa" (1968)	"Snatching It Back" (1969)

"Back Door Santa" is a funk-style song recorded by Clarence Carter, which Atlantic Records released as a single in 1968. In an artist biography, it is described as "a superbly funky Christmas single" and "raunchy". The song was included on an Atco various artists compilation album Soul Christmas (1968).

"Back Door Santa" has been recorded by several artists and Run-D.M.C. sampled it for "Christmas in Hollis". The lyrics include:

They call me backdoor Santa
I make my runs about the break of day
I make all the little girls happy
While the boys go out to play
