= Santa's Coming for Us =

Single by Sia

from the album Everyday Is Christmas
- B-side: "Santa & Cie"
- Released: 30 October 2017
- Studio: Echo Studios (Los Angeles, CA)
- Genre: Christmas
- Length: 3:26
- Label: Atlantic; Monkey Puzzle
- Songwriters: Sia Furler; Greg Kurstin
- Producer: Greg Kurstin

Sia singles chronology
| "Rainbow" (2017) | "Santa's Coming for Us" (2017) | "Snowman" (2017) |

Music video
- "Santa's Coming for Us" on YouTube

"Santa's Coming for Us" is a song written by Sia and Greg Kurstin and released on 30 October 2017 as the lead single from Sia's eighth studio album and first Christmas album, Everyday Is Christmas.

== Background and release ==
Sia wrote "Santa's Coming for Us" with her long-time collaborator Greg Kurstin, who also produced the song. In an interview with Entertainment Weekly, Kurstin said that writing the song "took me back to when we used to get into jazz chord changes", referencing Sia's early career.

== Music video ==
The music video for "Santa's Coming for Us" was released on 22 November 2017 and stars Kristen Bell hosting a Christmas party. Guests include her real-life husband Dax Shepard as her husband, JB Smoove as Santa Claus, Susan Lucci and Henry Winkler as the grandparents, and Sophia Lillis, Wyatt Oleff, and Caleb McLaughlin as the children.

== Formats ==
France 7" single

Side A

1. "Santa's is Coming For Us"

Side B

1. "Santa & Cie" Musique Originale Matthieu Gonet

== Charts ==
=== Weekly charts ===
Weekly chart performance for "Santa's Coming for Us"
| Chart (2017–2024) | Peak position |
|---|---|
| Australia (ARIA) | 51 |
| Austria (Ö3 Austria Top 40) | 47 |
| Belgium (Ultratop 50 Flanders) | 45 |
| Belgium (Ultratop 50 Wallonia) | 46 |
| Canada Hot 100 (Billboard) | 67 |
| Canada AC (Billboard) | 1 |
| Canada Hot AC (Billboard) | 27 |
| Croatia International Airplay (Top lista) | 17 |
| Finland (Suomen virallinen lista) | 29 |
| France (SNEP) | 45 |
| Germany (GfK) | 50 |
| Global 200 (Billboard) | 99 |
| Hungary (Rádiós Top 40) | 33 |
| Hungary (Single Top 40) | 24 |
| Hungary (Stream Top 40) | 24 |
| Ireland (IRMA) | 37 |
| Israel International TV Airplay (Media Forest) | 5 |
| Italy (FIMI) | 82 |
| Japan Hot 100 (Billboard) | 70 |
| Japan Hot Overseas (Billboard) | 4 |
| Latvia (DigiTop100) | 77 |
| Lithuania (AGATA) | 33 |
| Mexico Ingles Airplay (Billboard) | 31 |
| Netherlands (Single Top 100) | 60 |
| New Zealand Heatseekers (RMNZ) | 4 |
| Norway (VG-lista) | 39 |
| Poland (Polish Airplay Top 100) | 32 |
| Poland (Polish Streaming Top 100) | 58 |
| Portugal (AFP) | 99 |
| Scotland Singles (OCC) | 62 |
| Slovakia Singles Digital (ČNS IFPI) | 45 |
| Slovenia (SloTop50) | 24 |
| South Korea (Gaon) | 107 |
| Spain (PROMUSICAE) | 63 |
| Sweden (Sverigetopplistan) | 46 |
| Switzerland (Schweizer Hitparade) | 27 |
| UK Singles (OCC) | 17 |
| US Bubbling Under Hot 100 (Billboard) | 11 |
| US Adult Contemporary (Billboard) | 1 |
| US Adult Pop Airplay (Billboard) | 40 |
| US Holiday Top 100 (Billboard) | 51 |

=== Year-end charts ===
Year-end chart performance for "Santa's Coming for Us"
| Chart (2018) | Position |
|---|---|
| US Adult Contemporary (Billboard) | 41 |

== Certifications ==
Certifications for "Santa's Coming for Us"
| Region | Certification | Certified units/sales |
|---|---|---|
| France (SNEP) | Gold | 100,000^{‡} |
| Denmark (IFPI Danmark) | Gold | 45,000^{‡} |
| New Zealand (RMNZ) | Gold | 15,000^{‡} |
| Poland (ZPAV) | Gold | 25,000^{‡} |
| United Kingdom (BPI) | Platinum | 600,000^{‡} |
| United States (RIAA) | Gold | 500,000^{‡} |
^{‡} Sales+streaming figures based on certification alone.

== See also ==
- List of number-one adult contemporary singles of 2017 (U.S.)
