= Send My Love (To Your New Lover) =

2016 single by Adele

Single by Adele

from the album 25
- Released: 16 May 2016
- Studio: MXM Studios, Stockholm; Eastcote Studios, London
- Genre: Pop; R&B; soul
- Length: 3:43
- Label: XL; Columbia
- Songwriters: Adele Adkins; Max Martin; Shellback
- Producers: Max Martin; Shellback

Adele singles chronology
"When We Were Young" (2016)	"Send My Love (To Your New Lover)" (2016)	"Water Under the Bridge" (2016)

Music video
- "Send My Love (To Your New Lover)" on YouTube

"Send My Love (To Your New Lover)" is a song recorded by English singer-songwriter Adele for her third studio album, 25. It was written by Adele, Max Martin and Shellback, with the latter two also handling its production. The song was first sent to mainstream radio on 13 May 2016 and then released to digital formats on 16 May 2016 by XL Recordings as the third single from the album. "Send My Love" is a pop and R&B song with an uptempo, rhythmic sound, which the singer describes as a "happy you're gone" song dedicated to an ex-boyfriend.

"Send My Love" received critical acclaim and appeared on various international charts after the release of 25. It peaked at number one in Iceland, number five in the UK, number eight in the US and number 10 in Canada. An accompanying music video directed by Patrick Daughters premiered on 22 May 2016 at the 2016 Billboard Music Awards. It features Adele singing the song against a black backdrop with many shots of her overlapping one another. The video received a nomination for Best Visual Effects at the 2016 MTV Video Music Awards.

Adele first performed the song live at Joe's Pub during an iHeartRadio special to promote 25. "Send My Love (To Your New Lover)" was also part of the set list during Adele's third concert tour, Adele Live 2016, which visited countries across Europe and North America; it was also performed at Glastonbury 2016.

== Background and release ==
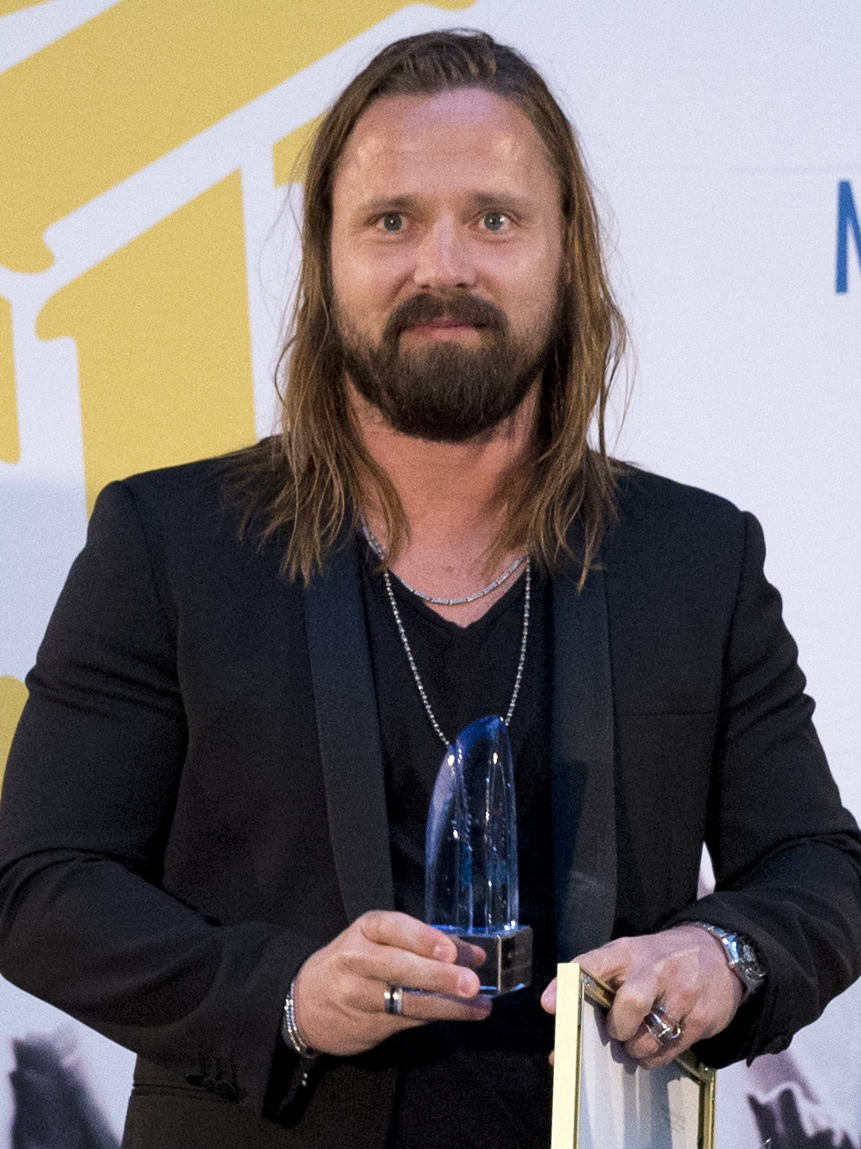
Max Martin co-wrote and co-produced the track.

After Adele's unproductive recording sessions with Ryan Tedder, they ended up feeling inspired, and during a session, wrote a track called "Remedy". Later, the pair went to lunch, where they heard American singer-songwriter Taylor Swift's 2012 single "I Knew You Were Trouble"; Adele liked it instantly. Tedder informed Adele that Max Martin produced the song, and sent her clips of his work. Shortly after this, Adele expressed interest in working with Martin, whom she had never heard of before, and the two later met for a session. Adele began work on the track, reworking a skeleton of a song she had written when she was thirteen years old after being inspired by the release of Frank (2003) by Amy Winehouse. Martin came to London, Adele showed him the guitar riff she had, and the duo finished the track on the guitar. Adele commented on the collaboration: "Max Martin, I just could hang out with him forever. He's so beautiful and lovely and funny and generous and warm and caring. He's a really amazing man." She also said the track was "a bit of fun," quipping: "You ain't got to be dark all the time."

"Send My Love (To Your New Lover)" was written by Adele, with Martin and Shellback who also handled the production. Adele played the guitar and provided backing vocals, along with Martin, while Shellback played the percussion and was responsible for programming. It was engineered by Michael Ilbert and mixed by Serban Ghenea at MixStar Studios, Virginia Beach. The track was recorded at two studios; MXM Studios in Stockholm and Eastcote Studios in London. At the last minute, Adele changed the title of the song from "We Ain't Kids No More" to "Send My Love (To Your New Lover)," explaining: "Otherwise, you might as well just call the fucking album 'Old.'"

Originally, the song was rumoured to be the album's lead-single, however "Hello" was chosen instead since "Send My Love (To Your New Lover)" did not "truly embody Adele’s intended ambition with '25'". After "Hello"'s success, Billboard wrote an article, on 26 November 2015, wondering what the next single from 25 would be, suggesting either "When We Were Young" or "Send My Love (To Your New Lover)", with the former eventually being released. Ultimately, "Send My Love (To Your New Lover)" was confirmed as the album's third single by iHeartRadio, and it was released on 16 May 2016 through digital services such as iTunes, Spotify, Amazon Prime, and others. On the same day, the song was serviced to hot adult contemporary radio and a day later to contemporary hit radio.

== Composition and lyrics ==
"Send My Love (To Your New Lover)" (2016)
A 22-second sample of "Send My Love (To Your New Lover)"'s chorus, a nimble pop song featuring an upbeat pop sound.

"Send My Love (To Your New Lover)" is a pop and R&B song, with a "subdued, spliced electronic pulse". It was considered one of the few up-tempo tracks on the album, along with "Water Under the Bridge". It has "a bit of a calypso vibe," and is "built around an almost African-sounding guitar lick". It was noted that its sound has a different rhythm "to distinguish the track from the rest of the record". The "upbeat, poppy, rhythmic" sound of "Send My Love (To Your New Lover)" has been compared to Taylor Swift's work, most prominently from her album 1989 (2014). It starts with "a stray studio comment from Adele — 'Just the guitar. O.K., cool' — before about a minute of acoustic guitar" and "hand-played percussion". Later, "the thickly layered harmony vocals and fuller arrangement arrive," while the "swooping refrain" has Adele in a "cheerful taunt". Amanda Petrusich of Pitchfork noted that Martin "relies on some enigmatic internal cadence, clipping syllables like a hiccuping poet, taking a tiny scalpel to his melodies," with Adele singing: "'Send-my-love/ To-your-new/ Luh-uh-ver.'" According to the music sheet published by MXM Music AB on Musicnotes.com, "Send My Love (To Your New Lover)" was composed using common time in the key of D major with a moderate tempo of 82 beats per minute. The chords in the verses alternate between D and Bm(add4). Adele's vocals span from the lower note of A_{3} to the higher note of D_{5}.

Lyrically, the song is a kiss-off track that discusses being righteous towards a former lover in order to forgive and find closure. At the beginning, Adele grieves for the end of a past relationship and relates the things her ex-lover did that wronged her during it. However, as the song progresses, she forgives her ex-partner, acknowledges that she will move on past him, heard in the lines "I'm giving you up / I've forgiven it all / You set me free, oh." During the song's chorus, she sends him good wishes and blessings for his new relationship, "Send my love to your new lover / Treat her better / We gotta let go of all our ghosts / We both know we ain't kids no more." Petrusich added that "[t]here's unrequited love, but then there’s love that changes shape; [...] This is the love that Adele sings of, the kind where there’s nothing left to do but resign." During an interview with The Guardian, Adele referred to the track as a "fuck-you song" to an ex-boyfriend, whom she dated between the guy who inspired her 21 album, and husband Simon Konecki. Adele describes it as a "happy you're gone" song, and commented that the opening line where she sings, "This was all you/ none of it me", "it's fucking sick." A writer for The Guardian deemed it to be a belligerent "revenge song," similar to Gloria Gaynor's "I Will Survive" (1978) and Beyoncé's "Irreplaceable" (2006).

== Critical reception ==
BBC News' Mark Savage called "Send My Love (To Your New Lover)" a "nimble pop/R&B song" and wrote that it "shows a fresh, playful side to the star". Rob Garratt of The National described the song as a "bouncy pop nugget" and opined that it "falls into that classic pop tradition of transforming a turn-down into a lover's rebuke". In a positive review, a writer for The Hindu described the track as a "spritely song" and called it "an I'm-so-glad-you're-gone number". Los Angeles Times' Mikael Wood dubbed the song "a welcome flash of sass". Consequence of Sound writer Steven Arroyo called it a more joyful "sentimental cousin" of "Someone like You". In an in-depth review of the song, Bustle writer Alex Kritselis called it one of the album's "major highlights" with its "über-catchy pop chorus". He further elaborated how its lyrics showcased the singer's "emotional growth" because of their maturity and compassion compared to the work on past albums . Kadeen Griffiths of the same magazine opined that the song is "the audio equivalent of Adele throwing a middle finger at whatever poor dude made the mistake of wronging a songwriter".

Maeve McDermott and Patrick Ryan of USA Today included "Send My Love (To Your New Lover)" in their list of 2015's 50 best songs. McDermott wrote "this song is among the most interesting of her career" and likened it to the works of Elizabeth Fraser. Complex's Michael Arceneaux thought that the track was the least sad song on 25, and added: "It’s a little melancholy, but it comes with some shimmy-inducing production." Business Insider's Tony Manfred noted that the song strays from Adele's earlier work, writing "she wades into the waters of contemporary pop music like never before". Nick Messitte of Forbes gave the song a positive review, writing: "It’s got the grace of damning individuals without sinking to their level; it boasts nostalgia—not the least of which for a sound popularized in 2013," and felt that Adele did not let Max Martin overpower her sensibilities. Vanity Fair's Josh Duboff called "Send My Love (To Your New Lover)" "the poppiest song Adele has ever recorded" and named it his "pick for the breakout track on 25".

Stephen Thomas Erlewine of AllMusic picked it as an album highlight, but remarked that the song "wither[s] when compared to the wallop of 'Rolling in the Deep'". Spin's T. Cole Rachel described it as "a cheeky pop side-eye that provides one of the records few resoundingly upbeat moments," [only on it] do we catch a glimpse of Adele's sense of humor." Lewis Corner of Digital Spy perceived that "[t]his is the most pop Adele has ever sounded. [...] It's remarkably sprightly for an Adele album, but the 27-year-old's affecting tone keeps it packed with purpose". Chris Gerard of PopMatters called it "an upbeat pop tune with electronic beats and a strong vocal from Adele that rises and falls with the rhythm. [...] Adele is clearly trying to experiment more in the glistening pop realm of the top 40, and it’s certainly a worthy idea to try something different. Some purists may complain about that, but let 'em. There is nothing wrong with great pop music, and 'Send My Love (to your new lover)' has undeniable attitude and is an earworm that will surely be chosen as a single."

Billboard ranked "Send My Love (To Your New Lover)" at number 26 on their 100 Best Pop Songs of 2016 list: "There are very few people who can record a pregame sing-a-long about bittersweet forgiveness, but 'Send My Love (To Your New Lover)' is just one of many such conflicted turn-ups for the 28-year-old, 10-time Grammy winner. With a jauntiness that feels all too raw, Adele nails the balance between passive aggression towards an undeserving ex ("Send my love to your new lover/ Treat her better") and unapologetic truth-telling ('I'm giving you up/ I'm forgiving it all/ You set me free') yet again."

== Chart performance ==
Before its release as a single, "Send My Love (To Your New Lover)" appeared on several charts. Following the release of 25 it debuted at number 88 on the ARIA Singles Chart. It later debuted at number 30, on 5 June 2016, and seven weeks later it peaked at number 13, where it remained for four consecutive weeks. On the Ö3 Austria Top 40, it appeared at number 56 on the chart dated 4 December 2015 and peaked at number 14. "Send My Love (To Your New Lover)" debuted and peaked at number 14 on the music charts in Finland, while in France it debuted at number 64 before its release as a single, and peaked at number 45 when it was officially released. On the Official German Charts, the song entered at 94 and reached number 31. In Spain, the song reached number 45 on the Spanish Singles Chart. In the United Kingdom, it debuted at number 112 on the UK Singles Chart and number 18 on the UK Indie Chart; it later reached numbers five and one, respectively. It also peaked at number four in Scotland on the chart dated 8 July 2016.

In the United States, "Send My Love (To Your New Lover)" debuted at number 79 on the 12 December 2015 Billboard Hot 100 chart, but dropped off it the following week. Following the release of its music video, the song re-entered the chart at a new peak position of 26 for the issue of 11 June 2016, selling 55,000 copies in that week, becoming Adele's ninth top 40 on the chart. These sales saw it re-enter the Digital Songs chart at number 13. The song reached number nine in the issue dated 13 August 2016, and later number eight in the issue dated 24 September 2016, becoming Adele's sixth top 10 hit (and the second from 25 following "Hello"). The song topped the Adult Top 40 and Adult Contemporary charts, becoming Adele's fourth number one on the Adult Pop Songs and fifth number one on the Adult Contemporary. This tied her with Taylor Swift for the most songs of the decade on the Adult Contemporary chart. The song also reached number one on the Pop Songs chart, becoming her fourth song to do so, and the second from her album 25. The song entered at number 79 on the Canadian Hot 100, and later reached number 11. On the South Korean Gaon Music Chart, it peaked at number 23. In New Zealand, the song debuted straight into the top-ten, at number eight and peaked at number four, where it remained for three consecutive weeks, becoming Adele's fifth top-five hit.

== Music video ==
=== Development and release ===
Patrick Daughters directed the music video.

The song's music video was filmed in London, by American director Patrick Daughters. Adele talked about it to the crowd during a concert in Stockholm in April 2016, saying that it was a dancing video, during which she lost "all... inhibitions". Speaking to Entertainment Weekly about the shooting of the video, Daughters noted that there "isn't any editing in the video... [b]ut in a way, as you watch the video many times, you start to make your own edits because you focus on different layers of her performance". The main idea behind the visual was to focus on Adele's performance; the concept behind it came from a line in the song about "letting go of her [Adele's] ghosts". There were twelve takes for the video which were all combined in one shot eventually; during each of them Adele expressed her emotions with a different movement. The director elaborated in an interview:

We looked at the song, the different layers of her vocals, that was one way to approach some layers. Some we did in a place that was emotionally more fresh. Then we had some takes that were a little bit more about really what the songs about, letting go of that stuff and getting past that and being more celebratory. After we had a few that we were really happy with, then we started to play with the emotions, the prevailing emotion in the take, and also a different reading.

A short teaser of the video was released on the singer's Twitter profile on 16 May 2016. It premiered on 22 May at the 2016 Billboard Music Awards, and was uploaded to the singer's official Vevo account shortly afterwards. The clip features the singer in front of a black backdrop. As the music video progresses, multiple semi-transparent shots of the singer dancing at the same time appear layered on top of one another in a kaleidoscopic form. The camera focuses on her facial expressions throughout. Adele wears a floral long-sleeved gown designed by Dolce & Gabbana which she chose by herself, without the assistance of a stylist or designer. She opted for it to stand out against the dark backdrop behind her. It was also chosen to "flow" with her movements.

=== Reception ===
The video was described as "trippy and upbeat" by Jackie Strause and Keely Wold of The Hollywood Reporter who noted how the singer intimately sings to the camera. Anna Gaca commented how there was a simple concept behind it – "multiple, semi-transparent images of Adele singing and dancing in an elegant Dolce & Gabbana gown covered in oversize roses". Erin Coulehan, from the website Salon, was very positive towards the clip noting how the kaleidoscopic effects showcased the "ever-revolving feelings of confusion, frustration and eventual solace" a person goes through after the realization that their partner is going on with their life with another love interest, something described in the song's lyrics. Coulehan further opined that many people could relate to those feelings. Sasha Gefen of MTV News described the visual as "psychedelic" and "ready to smash some YouTube records". Josh Duboff of Vanity Fair felt that the video was something rarely seen by the singer and called it an "overall upbeat kaleidoscopic delight". Lindsay Kimble, writing for People magazine praised Adele for opting for a simple concept for the video and compared the video's effects to a hall of mirrors.

Bustle's Shannon Carlin praised the release of the video, saying that the singer managed to turn it into an event with its premiere at the Billboard Music Awards. She also commended it for giving viewers an opportunity to see the singer's dance moves. Evan Minsker and Noah Yoo of Pitchfork observed that the multiple shots of Adele contributed to a "ghostly effect". Maeve McDermott writing for USA Today described it as a "swooning, floral vision". Elle's Alyssa Bailey wrote that the simple concept behind the video, along with the colors, effects, the singer's dancing and singing made it "beautiful". Eliza Thompson of Cosmopolitan noted that like the song itself, the clip was "absolutely gorgeous". Nash Jenkins of Time magazine felt that it was not "much more" than what was seen in the snippet but, called it "refreshing for its maturity and minimalism". James Rettig from the website Stereogum was more negative towards the clip saying that it looks like a "boringly pretty screensaver" because of the many slow fading shots.

== Live performances ==
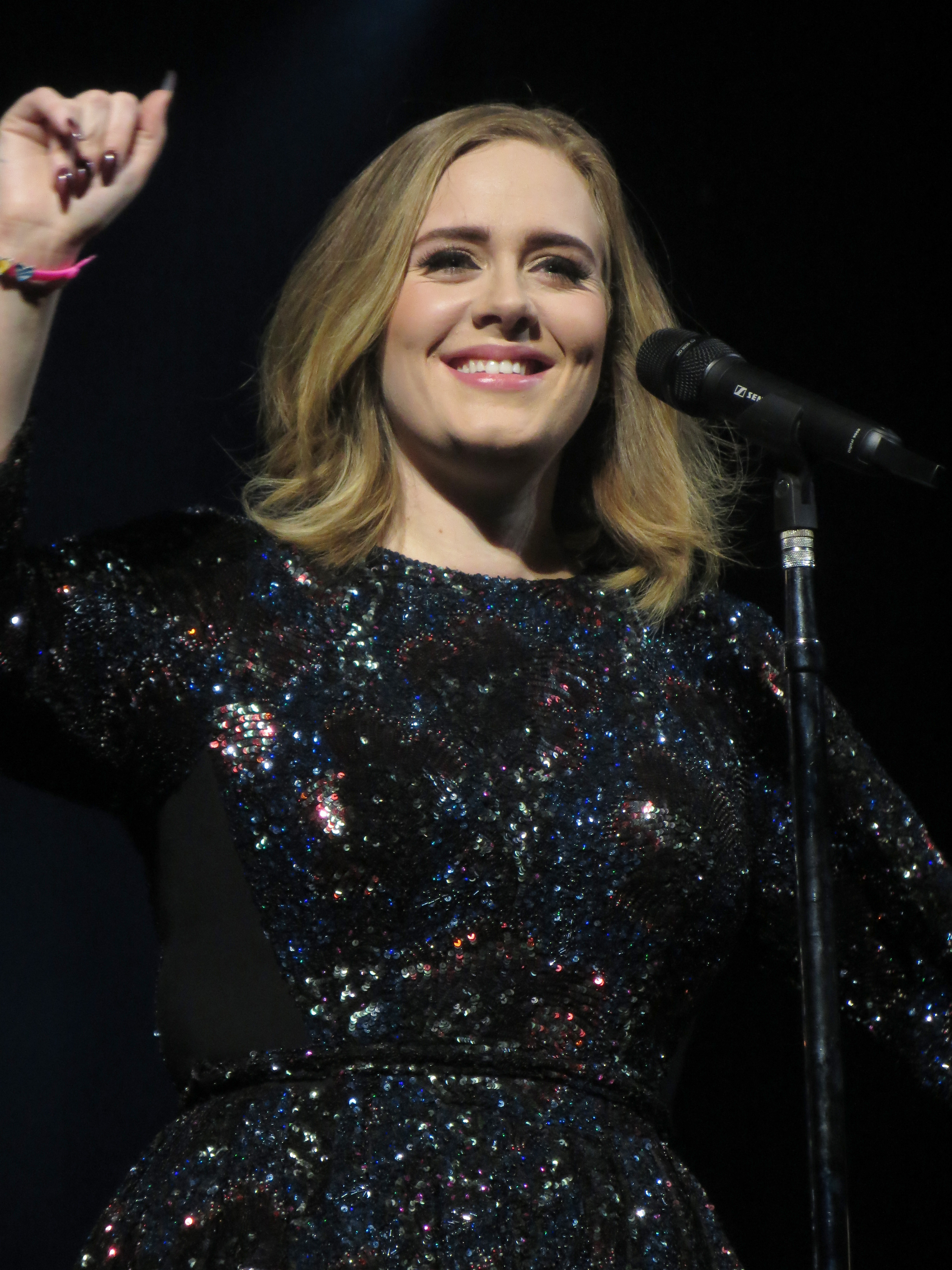
Adele performing at Adele Live 2016

Adele performed "Send My Love (To Your New Lover)" for the first time on 20 November 2015 at Joe's Pub during an iHeartRadio special launched for the release of 25. The song is part of the set list of Adele's third concert tour Adele Live 2016. During some concerts, an acoustic version of the song was performed. She also performed the song at Glastonbury 2016 on 25 June 2016.

== Cover versions ==
"Send My Love" was covered by American pop rock band OneRepublic at BBC Radio 1's Live Lounge on 1 September 2016. American rock band Boyce Avenue covered the song on their YouTube channel as an acoustic cover. American country pop singer Kelsea Ballerini also covered "Send My Love" on The Bobby Bones Show. I'm With Her released a single of their live cover of the song in 2017 as a mostly a cappella version with Paul Kowert from Punch Brothers accompanying the band on upright bass.

== Credits and personnel ==
Credits adapted from the album's liner notes.

Locations

- Recorded at MXM Studios, Stockholm, Sweden and Eastcote Studios, London, UK
- Mixed at MixStar Studio, Virginia Beach, VA

Personnel

- Adele – lead vocals, backing vocals, songwriter, guitar
- Max Martin – producer, songwriter, backing vocals
- Shellback – producer, songwriter, programmer, percussion
- Michael Ilbert – engineer
- Serban Ghenea – mixer
- John Hanes – mixing engineer

== Charts ==
=== Weekly charts ===
Chart (2015–2021)	Peak position
Argentina (Monitor Latino)	5
Australia (ARIA)	13
Austria (Ö3 Austria Top 40)	14
Belgium (Ultratop 50 Flanders)	4
Belgium (Ultratop 50 Wallonia)	3
Brazil (Billboard Brasil Hot 100)	2
Canada Hot 100 (Billboard)	10
Canada AC (Billboard)	1
Canada CHR/Top 40 (Billboard)	4
Canada Hot AC (Billboard)	2
Czech Republic Airplay (ČNS IFPI)	7
Czech Republic Singles Digital (ČNS IFPI)	16
Euro Digital Songs (Billboard)	4
Finland Download (Latauslista)	14
France (SNEP)	45
Germany (GfK)	31
Greece Digital Songs (Billboard)	9
Guatemala (Monitor Latino)	7
Hungary (Rádiós Top 40)	2
Hungary (Single Top 40)	14
Iceland (RÚV)	1
Ireland (IRMA)	7
Israel International Airplay (Media Forest)	2
Italy (FIMI)	40
Mexico (Billboard Mexican Airplay)	15
Netherlands (Dutch Top 40)	13
Netherlands (Single Top 100)	32
New Zealand (Recorded Music NZ)	4
Poland Airplay (ZPAV)	2
Portugal (AFP)	34
Romania (Media Forest)	7
Scottish Singles Sales (Official Charts)	4
Slovakia Airplay (ČNS IFPI)	15
Slovakia Singles Digital (ČNS IFPI)	19
Slovenia (SloTop50)	12
South Africa Airplay (EMA)	3
South Africa (RISA)	90
South Korea International Chart (Gaon)	23
Spain (Promusicae)	45
Sweden (Sverigetopplistan)	28
Switzerland (Schweizer Hitparade)	18
UK Singles (Official Charts)	5
UK Indie (Official Charts)	1
US Billboard Hot 100	8
US Adult Contemporary (Billboard)	1
US Adult Pop Airplay (Billboard)	1
US Dance Club Songs (Billboard)	43
US Dance Airplay (Billboard)	15
US Pop Airplay (Billboard)	1
US Rock & Alternative Airplay (Billboard)	34
Venezuela English (Record Report)	3

Chart (2021)	Peak position
Global 200 (Billboard)	79

=== Year-end charts ===
Chart (2016)	Position
Argentina (Monitor Latino)	9
Australia (ARIA)	45
Austria (Ö3 Austria Top 40)	55
Belgium (Ultratop Flanders)	29
Belgium (Ultratop Wallonia)	14
Brazil (Brasil Hot 100)	17
Canada (Canadian Hot 100)	29
Hungary (Rádiós Top 40)	31
Hungary (Single Top 40)	63
Iceland (Tónlistinn)	5
Netherlands (Dutch Top 40)	79
New Zealand (Recorded Music NZ)	31
Switzerland (Schweizer Hitparade)	77
UK Singles (Official Charts Company)	53
US Billboard Hot 100	26
US Adult Contemporary (Billboard)	12
US Adult Top 40 (Billboard)	2
US Mainstream Top 40 (Billboard)	27

Chart (2017)	Position
US Adult Contemporary (Billboard)	11

== Certifications ==
Region	Certification	Certified units/sales
Australia (ARIA)	Platinum	70,000^{‡}
Belgium (BRMA)	Platinum	20,000^{‡}
Brazil (Pro-Música Brasil)	2× Diamond	500,000^{‡}
Canada (Music Canada)	6× Platinum	480,000^{‡}
Denmark (IFPI Danmark)	Platinum	90,000^{‡}
France (SNEP)	Gold	100,000^{‡}
Italy (FIMI)	Platinum	50,000^{‡}
Mexico (AMPROFON)	3× Platinum	180,000^{‡}
New Zealand (RMNZ)	5× Platinum	150,000^{‡}
Norway (IFPI Norway)	Platinum	60,000^{‡}
Portugal (AFP)	Platinum	10,000^{‡}
Spain (Promusicae)	Platinum	60,000^{‡}
United Kingdom (BPI)	3× Platinum	1,800,000^{‡}
United States (RIAA)	Platinum	1,000,000^{‡}
^{‡} Sales+streaming figures based on certification alone.

== Radio and release history ==
Region	Date	Format	Label	Ref.
Russia	21 March 2016	Mainstream radio	XL	
Italy	13 May 2016	Mainstream radio	XL	
Hungary	16 May 2016	Digital download	XL	
United States	16 May 2016	Hot AC radio	Columbia	
United States	17 May 2016	Mainstream radio	Columbia	
United States	7 June 2016	Rhythmic contemporary radio	Columbia	

== See also ==
- List of Billboard Adult Contemporary number ones of 2016 and 2017 (U.S.)
