= Everyday Is Christmas (album) =

2017 Christmas album by Sia

Studio album by Sia
- Released: 17 November 2017
- Recorded: May 2017
- Studios: Echo Studios (Los Angeles, California); MixStar Studios (Virginia Beach, Virginia); Sterling Sound (New York City, New York)
- Genres: Christmas; pop
- Length: 35:07
- Labels: Atlantic; Monkey Puzzle
- Producer: Greg Kurstin

Sia chronology
This Is Acting (2016)	Everyday Is Christmas (2017)	Music – Songs from and Inspired by the Motion Picture (2021)

Alternative cover
- Snowman Deluxe edition cover

Singles from Everyday Is Christmas
- 1. "Santa's Coming for Us" Released: 30 October 2017; 2. "Snowman" Released: 9 November 2017

Everyday Is Christmas is the eighth studio album and first Christmas album by Australian singer-songwriter Sia, released on 17 November 2017 by Atlantic Records and Monkey Puzzle. Initially released with ten original tracks in 2017, the album was reissued in 2018, 2021, and 2022 with new bonus tracks each time. The lead single, "Santa's Coming for Us", was released on 30 October 2017, and "Snowman" was released as the second on 9 November.

== Recording and release ==
Sia confirmed the release of her first Christmas album on 1 August 2017, alongside the announcement that she had left RCA Records and signed for Atlantic Records. The album became her first release through Atlantic and features all original songs co-written with longtime collaborator Greg Kurstin, who worked heavily on Sia's previous three studio albums: We Are Born (2010), 1000 Forms of Fear (2014) and This Is Acting (2016). Christmas albums by major recording artists containing entirely original Christmas songs are rare. Sia's frequent dance collaborator, Maddie Ziegler, is featured on the album cover. The standard version of the album consists of ten songs, all produced by Kurstin.

Recording sessions for the album took place over two weeks in May 2017 and left Sia and Kurstin "laughing at the end of each day". In September, Kurstin said of working on the album with Sia:

I don't know how she comes up with song lyric and melody ideas so quickly. ... [S]he wrote these new Christmas stories. ... I'm still sort of new at this Christmas thing. ... [It] took me back to when we used to get into jazz chord changes. There's some really fun uptempo Christmas jams, and then there's also some Sia ballads.

The album was released on 17 November 2017. In Japan, an exclusive domestic bonus track titled "My Old Santa Claus" was included on the CD. The song was later included on the deluxe edition of the album, released in November 2018, alongside "Sing for My Life" and a cover of Perry Como's "Round and Round". In the United States, the deluxe edition CD was released as a Target exclusive.

On 5 November 2021, another deluxe edition was released. Subtitled the Snowman Deluxe Edition, it included three bonus tracks, in addition to those on the 2018 deluxe edition: "Pin Drop", "Santa Visits Everyone", and the "Slowed Down & Snowed In TikTok Remix" of "Snowman". On 11 November 2022, the Snowman Deluxe Edition was reissued with four additional tracks: "Naughty & Nice", "12 Nights", "3 Minutes 'Til New Years", and a sped-up version of "Snowman". "2 Minutes 'Til New Years" was included on yet another digital reissue of the album on 30 December 2022.

== Promotion ==
The lead single, "Santa's Coming for Us", was released on 30 October 2017, along with the pre-order of the album. A music video of the song was released on 22 November, which stars Kristen Bell hosting a Christmas party. The song reached a peak position of number 9 on Billboard's Holiday Digital Song Sales chart, number 1 on the Adult Contemporary chart, and 51 on the Holiday Top 100. It peaked at 39 in the United Kingdom and debuted at 70 in Scotland.

"Snowman", released on 9 November 2017, reached a peak position of 3 in the Holiday Digital Song Sales chart. Additional songs also charted on the Holiday Digital Song Sales chart, with "Candy Cane Lane" peaking at 13 and "Everyday Is Christmas" peaking at 28. Sia appeared on Ellen (with Maddie Ziegler) and on The Voice to perform "Snowman". The music video for "Snowman", directed by Lior Molcho, premiered on 30 October 2020.

== Critical reception ==
Professional ratings
Aggregate scores
Source	Rating
Metacritic	59/100
Review scores
Source	Rating
ABC News	4/5 stars
AllMusic	3/5 stars
Financial Times	3/5 stars
The Guardian	2/5 stars
Pitchfork	5.8/10
Rolling Stone Australia	3.5/5 stars
Slant Magazine	2.5/5 stars
Time Out	3/5 stars

At Metacritic, which assigns a normalised rating out of 100 to reviews from mainstream critics, the album received an average score of 59 based on 6 reviews, indicating "mixed or average reviews".

Katherine St. Asaph of Pitchfork wrote that Everyday Is Christmas, as an album, feels "inconsistent and underwritten", comparing it to "opening a gift where someone’s forgotten to remove the tags". Asaph described the production as "vaguely festive" and criticised the positioning of "Snowman" next to "Snowflake" in the track listing, considering they both make use of the same metaphor. Allan Raible of ABC News, however, praised the record, noting Sia designed the album for those "who are turned off" by the holiday classics. Annabel Ross of Rolling Stone Australia commented that, while Sia would have done a "fine job" interpreting the classics, it was "hard to veer too far wrong" with her and Kurstin's original songs.

== Commercial performance ==
The album debuted at number 27 on the Billboard 200, selling 19,000 album-equivalent units, while 15,000 of those were pure album sales.

== Track listing ==
All tracks are written by Sia Furler and Greg Kurstin, and produced by Kurstin, except where noted.

Everyday Is Christmas track listing
No.	Title	Length
1.	"Santa's Coming for Us"	3:26
2.	"Candy Cane Lane"	3:32
3.	"Snowman"	2:45
4.	"Snowflake"	4:02
5.	"Ho Ho Ho"	3:25
6.	"Puppies Are Forever"	3:43
7.	"Sunshine"	3:25
8.	"Underneath the Mistletoe"	3:50
9.	"Everyday Is Christmas"	3:23
10.	"Underneath the Christmas Lights"	3:36
Total length:		35:07

Japanese edition bonus track
No.	Title	Length
11.	"My Old Santa Claus"	3:24
Total length:		38:31

Deluxe edition bonus tracks (2018)
No.	Title	Writer(s)	Length
11.	"Round and Round"	Joe Shapiro; Lou Stallman	2:29
12.	"Sing for My Life"		3:44
13.	"My Old Santa Claus"		3:24
Total length:			44:44

Additional deluxe edition bonus tracks (2021)
No.	Title	Writer(s)	Producer(s)	Length
14.	"Pin Drop"	Furler; Jesse Shatkin	Shatkin	3:59
15.	"Santa Visits Everyone"	Furler; Shatkin	Shatkin	3:08
16.	"Snowman" (Slowed Down & Snowed In Remix)			3:01
Total length:				54:52

Additional deluxe edition bonus tracks (11 November 2022)
No.	Title	Writer(s)	Producer(s)	Length
16.	"Naughty & Nice"	Furler; Shatkin	Shatkin	2:10
17.	"12 Nights"	Furler; Shatkin; Erick Serna	Shatkin	4:07
18.	"3 Minutes 'Til New Years"	Furler; Shatkin; Serna	Shatkin	3:41
19.	"Snowman" (Slowed Down)		Kurstin; Scott Chesak	3:01
20.	"Snowman" (Sped Up)			2:17
Total length:				1:07:05

Additional deluxe edition bonus tracks (30 December 2022)
No.	Title	Writer(s)	Producer(s)	Length
19.	"2 Minutes 'Til New Years"	Furler; Shatkin; Serna	Shatkin	2:41
20.	"Snowman" (Slowed Down)		Kurstin; Scott Chesak	3:01
21.	"Snowman" (Sped Up)			2:17
Total length:				1:10:05

== Personnel ==
Credits adapted from the liner notes of Everyday Is Christmas.

- Sia – songwriting, vocals, concept, art direction
- Greg Kurstin – songwriting, production, bass, drums (1–9, 11–13), keyboards (1–9, 11–13), piano (1–5, 8–13), guitar (1, 2, 5–7, 9, 11), percussion (2, 6, 7, 11, 13), organ (2), vibraphone (2, 12–13), pump organ (5), Mellotron (6, 9, 10, 13), celeste (4, 7, 8, 12), whistling (7), baritone guitar (8), glockenspiel (8, 13), engineering
- David Ralicke – trumpet, trombone, baritone sax, bass sax (1, 5), tenor sax (1), Mellophone, Euphonium, soprano sax (5)
- Alex Pasco – engineering
- Julian Burg – engineering
- Serban Ghenea – mixing
- John Hanes – mix engineering
- RJ Shaughnessy – photography
- Tonya Brewer – glam
- Samantha Burkhart – wardrobe
- Leigh Poindexter – art direction
- Virgilio Tzaj – design

== Charts ==
=== Weekly charts ===
Weekly chart performance for Everyday Is Christmas
Chart (2017–2025)	Peak position
Australian Albums (ARIA)	7
Austrian Albums (Ö3 Austria)	7
Belgian Albums (Ultratop Flanders)	33
Belgian Albums (Ultratop Wallonia)	29
Canadian Albums (Billboard)	8
Czech Albums (ČNS IFPI)	23
Danish Albums (Hitlisten)	4
Dutch Albums (Album Top 100)	3
Estonian Albums (Albumid Tipp-40)	9
Finnish Albums (Suomen virallinen lista)	2
French Albums (SNEP)	47
German Albums (Offizielle Top 100)	4
Hungarian Albums (MAHASZ)	3
Icelandic Albums (Tónlistinn)	17
Irish Albums (IRMA)	44
Italian Albums (FIMI)	23
Japanese Albums (Oricon)	69
Latvian Albums (LaIPA)	7
Lithuanian Albums (AGATA)	4
New Zealand Albums (RMNZ)	16
Norwegian Albums (VG-lista)	2
Polish Albums (ZPAV)	15
Scottish Albums (Official Charts)	40
Slovak Albums (ČNS IFPI)	33
South Korean Albums (Circle)	80
South Korean International Albums (Circle)	6
Spanish Albums (Promusicae)	30
Swedish Albums (Sverigetopplistan)	5
Swiss Albums (Schweizer Hitparade)	4
UK Albums (Official Charts)	39
US Billboard 200	27
US Top Holiday Albums (Billboard)	3

=== Year-end charts ===
2017 year-end chart performance for Everyday Is Christmas
Chart (2017)	Rank
Australian Artist Albums (ARIA)	39
Belgian Albums (Ultratop Wallonia)	176

2023 year-end chart performance for Everyday Is Christmas
Chart (2023)	Rank
Hungarian Albums (MAHASZ)	80

== Certifications and sales ==
Certifications for Everyday Is Christmas
Region	Certification	Certified units/sales
Canada (Music Canada)	Gold	40,000^{‡}
Denmark (IFPI Danmark)	Platinum	20,000^{‡}
France (SNEP)	Gold	50,000^{‡}
Italy (FIMI)	Gold	25,000^{‡}
New Zealand (RMNZ)	Gold	7,500^{‡}
United Kingdom (BPI)	Silver	60,000^{‡}
^{‡} Sales+streaming figures based on certification alone.
