= This Christmas (Donny Hathaway song) =

1970 single by Donny Hathaway

- 1970 US retail vinyl release

Single by Donny Hathaway

from the album Soul Christmas
- B-side: "Be There"
- Released: December 9, 1970
- Recorded: 1970
- Studio: Audio Finishers Studio, Chicago
- Genre: Christmas; R&B; soul
- Length: 3:51
- Label: Atco Records
- Songwriters: Donny Hathaway (as "Donny Pitts") and Nadine Theresa McKinnor
- Producer: Don-Ric Enterprises

Donny Hathaway singles chronology
"The Ghetto – Part 1" (1970)	"This Christmas" (1970)	"You've Got a Friend" (1971)

Official video
- "This Christmas" on YouTube

"This Christmas" is a song by American soul musician Donny Hathaway released in 1970 by Atco Records. The song gained renewed popularity when it was included in 1991 on Atco Records' revised edition of their 1968 Soul Christmas compilation album and has since become a modern Christmas standard, with the American Society of Composers, Authors and Publishers reporting that it was the 30th most-performed holiday song of all time.

"This Christmas" did not appear on the Billboard Hot 100 chart until 2021, over fifty years after its original release, and reached its peak on the chart of number 34 in January 2024.

Phil Upchurch said the song was "absolutely the premiere holiday song written by an African American". It was written by Hathaway and Nadine McKinnor.

== History ==
"This Christmas" was recorded at Audio Finishers Studio on Ontario Street in Chicago in the fall of 1970. Ric Powell (see credits below) said that Hathaway was "very upbeat during the session" and that he "knew what he wanted to do musically" regarding the representation of African Americans in Christmas music. On writing the song with Hathaway (who died in 1979), Nadine McKinnor said she felt "blessed to have written Donny a song that celebrates the possibilities, the expectations, and the anticipation of Christmas and the good fun and happy loving times", and that the creation of the song "was a God plan. God was in this plan. And Donny Hathaway was a genius."

"This Christmas" was released as a single in 1970. It initially saw little success, as it was listed just once on any of Billboard magazine's weekly published music charts in the 1970s, specifically Billboard's special Christmas Singles chart (on the week ending December 23, 1972, at position No. 11). But in the last 30 years, the song has made it onto a number of Billboard's weekly music charts. In addition to making its first appearance on the main Billboard Hot 100 songs chart in late December 2020 (peaking at No. 34 three years later), Hathaway's "This Christmas" has also appeared on these other Billboard music charts: Global 200 (No. 52 peak position in early January 2024), Global 200 Excl. US (No. 140 peak position in January 2024), Holiday 100 (No. 25 peak position in early January 2014), Holiday Digital Song Sales (No. 32 peak position in early January 2022), Holiday Streaming Songs (No. 27 peak position in mid December 2020), LyricFind Global (No. 13 peak position in mid December 2024), LyricFind U.S. (No. 21 peak position in mid December 2024), R&B Digital Song Sales (No. 5 peak position in late December 2023), R&B Streaming Songs (No. 6 peak position in early January 2021), R&B/Hip-Hop Digital Song Sales (No. 12 peak position in late December 2023), R&B/Hip-Hop Streaming Songs (No. 6 peak position in early January 2021), Radio Songs (No. 38 peak position in early January 2025), and Streaming Songs (No. 27 peak position in early January 2021).

In 1991, Atco Records released a revised edition of their 1968 compilation album Soul Christmas that included "This Christmas".

== Credits ==
- Vocals, keyboard, bass: Donny Hathaway
- Writing: Hathaway (as "Donny Pitts"), Nadine McKinnor
- Electric guitar: Phil Upchurch
- Rhythm guitar: Chris Christmas
- Drums: Morris Jennings
- Drums, bass drum, congas, sleigh bells: Ric Powell
- Baritone saxophone: Willie Henderson
- Trombones: Louis Satterfield

== Charts ==
Chart performance for "This Christmas" by Donny Hathaway
Chart (2010–2026)	Peak position
Canada Hot 100 (Billboard)	48
Global 200 (Billboard)	52
Ireland (IRMA)	50
Lithuania (AGATA)	68
Netherlands (Single Top 100)	51
Japan (Japan Hot 100)	68
Sweden (Sverigetopplistan)	86
Switzerland (Schweizer Hitparade)	73
UK Singles (Official Charts)	63
US Billboard Hot 100	34
US Holiday 100 (Billboard)	25
US Rolling Stone Top 100	28

== Certifications ==
Certifications for "This Christmas" by Donny Hathaway
Region	Certification	Certified units/sales
United Kingdom (BPI)	Silver	200,000^{‡}
^{‡} Sales+streaming figures based on certification alone.

== Jess Glynne version ==
"This Christmas"

Single by Jess Glynne
- Released: 12 November 2020
- Length: 2:59
- Label: Atlantic
- Songwriters: Donny Hathaway; Nadine Theresa McKinnor

Jess Glynne singles chronology
"Lie for You" (2020)	"This Christmas" (2020)	"Silly Me" (2023)

English singer and songwriter Jess Glynne released a cover version of the song as a single on 12 November 2020. The single peaked at number three on the UK Singles Chart. Daniel Welsh of HuffPost UK rated Glynne's version three out of five stars, writing that "fans of both Jess Glynne and background Christmas music" would enjoy this version. It's Glynne's last single to be released under Atlantic Records.

=== Background ===
Talking about the song, Glynne said:

I chose 'This Christmas' by Donny Hathaway as I love the tone of this record and I'm thankful that Amazon Music have given me the opportunity to do my own version of it for them. This year has been such a hard one and there's no doubt this Christmas is going to be difficult for so many people. Music is so important as it gives us moments of escapism and I think more than ever having an uplifting feel good song is so necessary.

=== Charts ===
Chart (2021)	Peak position
Italy (FIMI)	72
UK Singles (Official Charts)	3

=== Certifications and sales ===
Region	Certification	Certified units/sales
United Kingdom (BPI)	Silver	200,000^{‡}
^{‡} Sales+streaming figures based on certification alone.

== Other versions ==
The song has been covered by multiple artists including Patti LaBelle and Diana Ross. After the songs inclusion on Atco Records' 1991 reissue of Soul Christmas, the song gained popularity for its numerous covers by other artists, particularly well-known pop, smooth jazz and R&B artists.

LaBelle performed the song at the lighting of the American National Christmas Tree in 1996. During the performance, her backing singers failed to appear with a frustrated LaBelle noting so onstage.

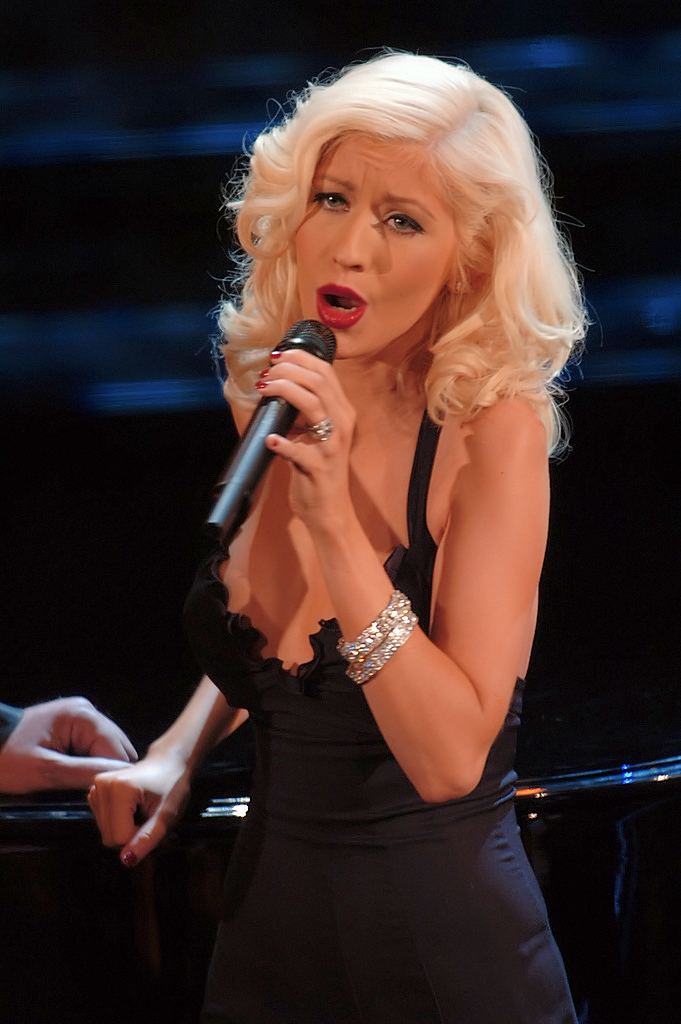
Christina Aguilera is among several artists who have covered the song over the years.

Christina Aguilera recorded a cover of the song for her third studio album My Kind of Christmas (2000). The song was certified gold by IFPI Danmark for selling over 45,000 units.

In 2001, Destiny's Child released a cover of the song for their studio album, 8 Days of Christmas. Entertainment Weekly critic Chris Willman described the band's rendition as "solid". Elliott Yamin released his version as his debut single in December 2006, which reached No. 21 on Billboard's Adult Contemporary chart.

A cover of the song by Chris Brown, recorded for the 2007 film of the same name, peaked at No. 62 on the Billboard Hot 100 chart and was certified Platinum by the RIAA.

Lady Antebellum covered the song for the 2012 Christmas album On This Winter's Night. In December 2012, The Philadelphia Tribune music critic Nekesa Mumbi Moody praised Lady Antebellum's recording and the rest of the album. However, Ludovic Hunter-Tilney of the Financial Times panned the album and called the trio's cover recording a "slickly insincere 1980s soul."

CeeLo Green covered the song for Cee Lo's Magic Moment (2012). Also in December 2012, Alan Sculley of Asbury Park Press praised CeeLo Green's recording as "a good Stevie Wonder". One of The StarPhoenix music critics called CeeLo's takes on the song and "What Christmas Means to Me" not as good as original versions but "worth a listen" with "enough originality". However, Melissa Ruggieri of The Atlanta Journal-Constitution criticised CeeLo's version as skippable and "surprisingly dull". Covers by Seal and by American band Train each went to No. 1 on the Adult Contemporary chart in 2015 and 2016, respectively. In December 2016, Mark Daniell of the Ottawa Sun praised versions by the following artists as "good": Lady Antebellum, Chris Brown, Macy Gray, and CeeLo Green.

Sabrina Carpenter performed a cover of this song with Tyla for her 2024 Netflix Christmas special, A Nonsense Christmas with Sabrina Carpenter. The Everygirl critic praised this rendition as one of "perfectly matched" duets that "stole the show." Screen Rant critic Sarah Novack placed this rendition fourth out of top ten performances from the special. Novack criticized the holiday song as not "particularly interesting" despite "countless alternatives", but she praised the duet's "stunning vocals and performing chemistry" and found the rendition "even better with the backup singers and musicians".

== See also ==
- List of number-one adult contemporary singles of 2016 (U.S.)
